= 2006 ABC Supply / A. J. Foyt Indy 225 =

IndyCar race held in West Allis, Wisconsin

(United States) 2006 ABC Supply / A. J. Foyt Indy 225
Race details
Race 10 of 14 in the 2006 IndyCar season
← Previous race	Next race →
- Date: July 23, 2006
- Official name: ABC Supply / A. J. Foyt Indy 225
- Location: Milwaukee Mile, West Allis, Wisconsin
- Course: Permanent racing facility 1.015 mi / 1.633 km
- Distance: 225 laps 228.375 mi / 367.534 km

Pole position
- Driver: (Brazil) Hélio Castroneves (Marlboro Team Penske)
- Time: 21.1854

Fastest lap
- Driver: (South Africa) Tomas Scheckter (Vision Racing)
- Time: 22.2961 (on lap 218 of 225)

Podium
- First: (Brazil) Tony Kanaan (Andretti Green Racing)
- Second: (United States) Sam Hornish Jr. (Marlboro Team Penske)
- Third: (South Africa) Tomas Scheckter (Vision Racing)

Chronology
Previous	Next
2006 (Champ Car)	2007

The 2006 ABC Supply / A. J. Foyt Indy 225 was an IRL IndyCar Series motor race held on July 23, 2006, in West Allis, Wisconsin at the Milwaukee Mile. It was the tenth round of the 2006 IRL ndyCar Series and the third running of the event. Tony Kanaan, driving for Andretti Green Racing, won the 225-lap race from the fourth position. Marlboro Team Penske driver Sam Hornish Jr. finished second and Vision Racing's Tomas Scheckter finished third.

Hélio Castroneves won the pole position by setting the fastest lap of qualifying. He led the first 31 laps until he was passed by Kanaan, who held the lead until making a pit stop on lap 74. He reclaimed the lead two laps later. Dario Franchitti took the lead soon after a restart on lap 109 before being overtaken by Kanaan 26 laps later. Kanaan continued leading until being overtaken by Marco Andretti on lap 141, though Kanaan moved back into the lead on the 180th lap. He maintained his lead until the race ended, giving him the win. There were four cautions and eight lead changes between six drivers during the race.

Kanaan's win was the seventh of his IndyCar Series career and his first of the season. The result tied Kanaan and Vítor Meira, who retired from the race after crashing, for fifth place in the Drivers' Championship. Hornish Jr. extended his championship lead from five points to twenty-five points over second-place driver Scott Dixon, while Castroneves and Dan Wheldon remained third and fourth, respectively, with four races left in the season.

== Background ==
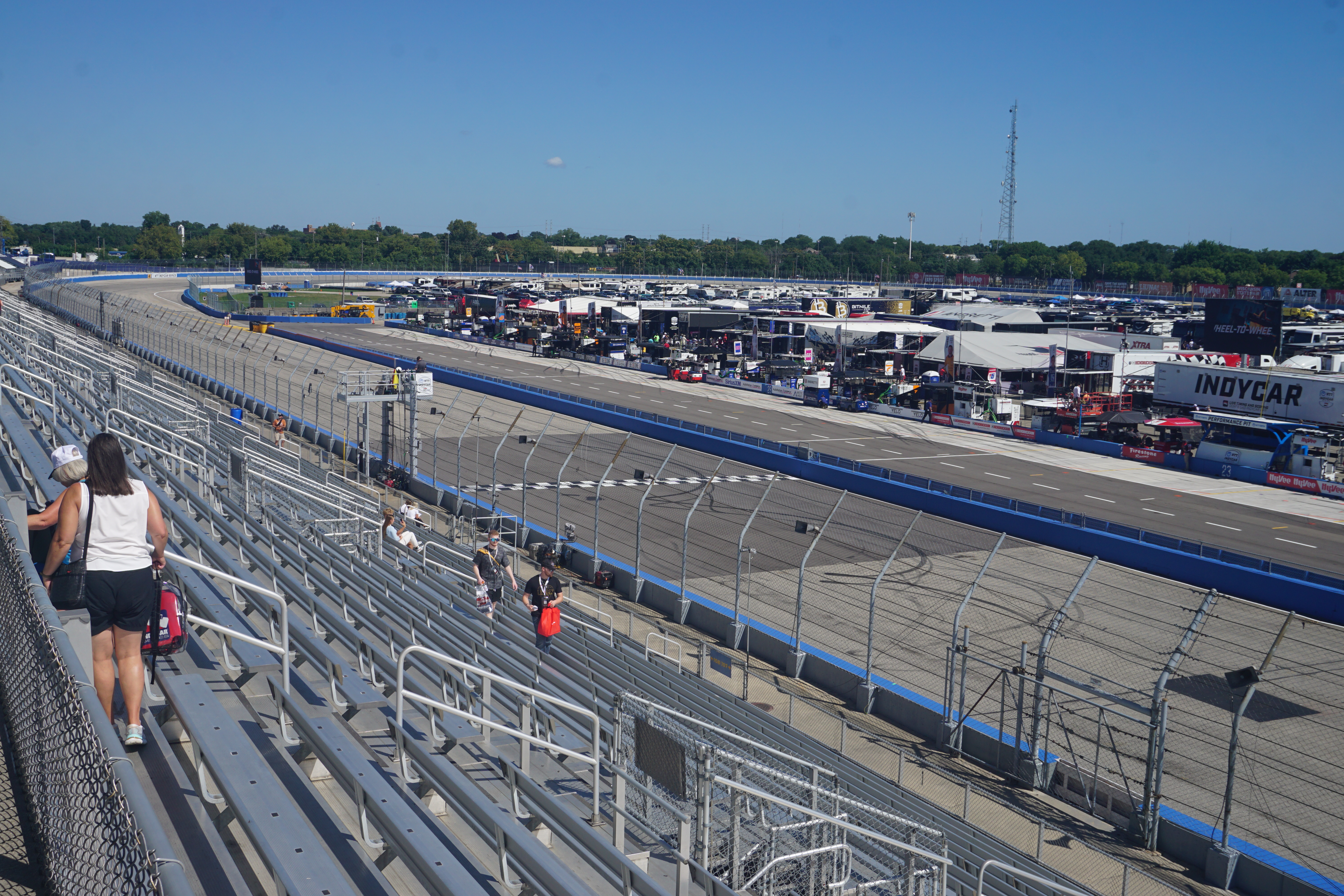
The Milwaukee Mile (pictured in 2024), where the race was held.

The ABC Supply / A. J. Foyt Indy 225 was the 10th of 14 scheduled open-wheel races for the 2006 IndyCar Series and the third edition of the event dating back to 2004. It was held on July 23, 2006, in West Allis, Wisconsin, United States, at the Milwaukee Mile, a four-turn 1.015 mi (1.633 km) asphalt oval track which features 9.25-degree banking in the turns and 2.5-degree banking in the front stretch and back stretch, and contested over 225 laps and 228.375 miles (367.534 km). Leading up to the race, Marlboro Team Penske driver Sam Hornish Jr. led the Drivers' Championship with 316 points, five more than Scott Dixon in second and six more than Hélio Castroneves in third. Dan Wheldon was fourth with 300 points and Vítor Meira, with 262 points, placed fifth. Hornish Jr. was the race's defending champion.

Days after meeting United States President George W. Bush at the White House for his recent win in the Indianapolis 500, Hornish Jr. was hopeful of performing well during the race: "The short straight-aways and flat turns make passing very difficult. But with a good handling car and a little bit of patience, hopefully we'll be able to bring the Marlboro Team Penske car into victory lane for the second year in a row." His teammate Castroneves regarded the track as "drastically different" from any other circuit on the schedule due to its lack of banking. Danica Patrick, who matched her career-best finish of fourth in the preceding Firestone Indy 200, predicted that hot temperatures would produce a slippery track surface and more cautions. Dario Franchitti assured that he would win the race: "I enjoy driving at the Milwaukee Mile and I've had a very good car there the last two years. We're going to Milwaukee to win."

== Practice and qualifying ==
Four practice sessions preceded the race on Sunday, two on Friday and two on Saturday. The first session lasted 120 minutes, the second 90 minutes, the third 60 minutes, and the fourth 30 minutes. The first three sessions were also divided into two groups which received equal track time. Franchitti led the first practice session on Friday morning with a time of 21.5691 seconds, besting Tony Kanaan, Bryan Herta, Castroneves, and Meira. Ryan Briscoe resorted to a back-up car after crashing into the turn-four SAFER barrier. Later that day, Marco Andretti was fastest in the second practice session with a time of 21.5839 seconds, ahead of Meira, Tomas Scheckter, Herta, and Jeff Bucknum. In the third practice session on Saturday morning, Castroneves was fastest with a time of 21.1046 seconds; Hornish Jr., Jeff Simmons, Meira, and Andretti occupied positions second through fifth.

Qualifying was held forty-five minutes after the third practice session concluded. Each driver was required to complete two timed laps, with the quicker of the two determining their starting position. Castroneves scored the 14th pole position of his IndyCar Series career with a time of 21.1854 seconds, breaking the track record set by Hornish Jr. in 2005 and surpassing Greg Ray to become the series' all-time leader in pole positions. He was joined on the grid's front row by teammate Hornish Jr., who was 0.0120 seconds slower and had the pole position until Castroneves' lap. Andretti qualified third, Kanaan fourth, and Meira fifth. Simmons, Ed Carpenter, Scheckter, Herta, and Dixon took the remaining positions in the top ten, and Wheldon, Franchitti, Buddy Rice, Patrick, Kosuke Matsuura, Bucknum, Scott Sharp, and Briscoe completed the starting grid. Patrick led the final practice session on Saturday afternoon with a time of 22.1654 seconds, beating Hornish Jr., Meira, Andretti, and Castroneves.

=== Qualifying classification ===
Pos	No.	Driver	Team	Time	Speed	Final grid
1	3	(Brazil) Hélio Castroneves	Marlboro Team Penske	21.1854	172.477	1
2	6	(United States) Sam Hornish Jr.	Marlboro Team Penske	21.1974	172.380	2
3	26	(United States) Marco Andretti	Andretti Green Racing	21.2732	171.765	3
4	11	(Brazil) Tony Kanaan	Andretti Green Racing	21.2841	171.677	4
5	4	(Brazil) Vítor Meira	Panther Racing	21.3929	170.804	5
6	17	(United States) Jeff Simmons	Rahal Letterman Racing	21.4195	170.592	6
7	20	(United States) Ed Carpenter	Vision Racing	21.4632	170.245	7
8	2	(South Africa) Tomas Scheckter	Vision Racing	21.4901	170.032	8
9	7	(United States) Bryan Herta	Andretti Green Racing	21.4954	169.990	9
10	9	(New Zealand) Scott Dixon	Target Chip Ganassi Racing	21.4962	169.984	10
11	10	(United Kingdom) Dan Wheldon	Target Chip Ganassi Racing	21.5003	169.951	11
12	27	(United Kingdom) Dario Franchitti	Andretti Green Racing	21.5297	169.719	12
13	15	(United States) Buddy Rice	Rahal Letterman Racing	21.5694	169.407	13
14	16	(United States) Danica Patrick	Rahal Letterman Racing	21.5863	169.274	14
15	55	(Japan) Kosuke Matsuura	Super Aguri Fernández Racing	21.6220	168.995	15
16	14	(United States) Jeff Bucknum	A. J. Foyt Racing	21.6723	168.602	18^{1}
17	8	(United States) Scott Sharp	Delphi Fernández Racing	21.8033	167.589	16
18	5	(Australia) Ryan Briscoe	Dreyer & Reinbold Racing	22.1153	165.225	17

Notes

- ^1 — Moved to the rear of the grid for changing engines after qualifying.

== Race ==
Live coverage of the race began at 12:30 PM Central Daylight Time (CDT) in the United States on ESPN. Commentary was provided by Marty Reid, Rusty Wallace, and Scott Goodyear. Weather conditions at the start of the race were fair, with air temperatures reaching 77 °F (25 °C) and track temperatures measuring 105 °F (41 °C). A. J. Foyt, for whom the race is named, gave the command for drivers to start their engines; prior to the race weekend, he had spent the past three weeks recovering from knee replacement surgery. Johnny Rutherford drove the pace car. During the pace laps, Bucknum was forced to start in the 18th position, despite qualifying 16th, due to an engine swap after the final practice session.

Castroneves maintained his pole position advantage on the first lap, while Kanaan passed teammate Andretti and Hornish Jr. to move into the second position. Castroneves managed to open his lead over Kanaan to 0.62 seconds by the tenth lap; meanwhile, Briscoe drove into pit road with a right-rear suspension issue. Ten laps later, Castroneves began navigating around lapped drivers, allowing Kanaan to close the gap. He drove down the track in an attempt to take the lead on lap 21, though Castroneves kept the position and built a quarter-second lead by the 25th lap. Kanaan moved into the lead in the first turn on lap 32. Matsuura entered pit road on the 42nd lap for tires and adjustments. Castroneves was passed by Andretti for the second position on the 54th lap, and by Meira for the third position three laps later.

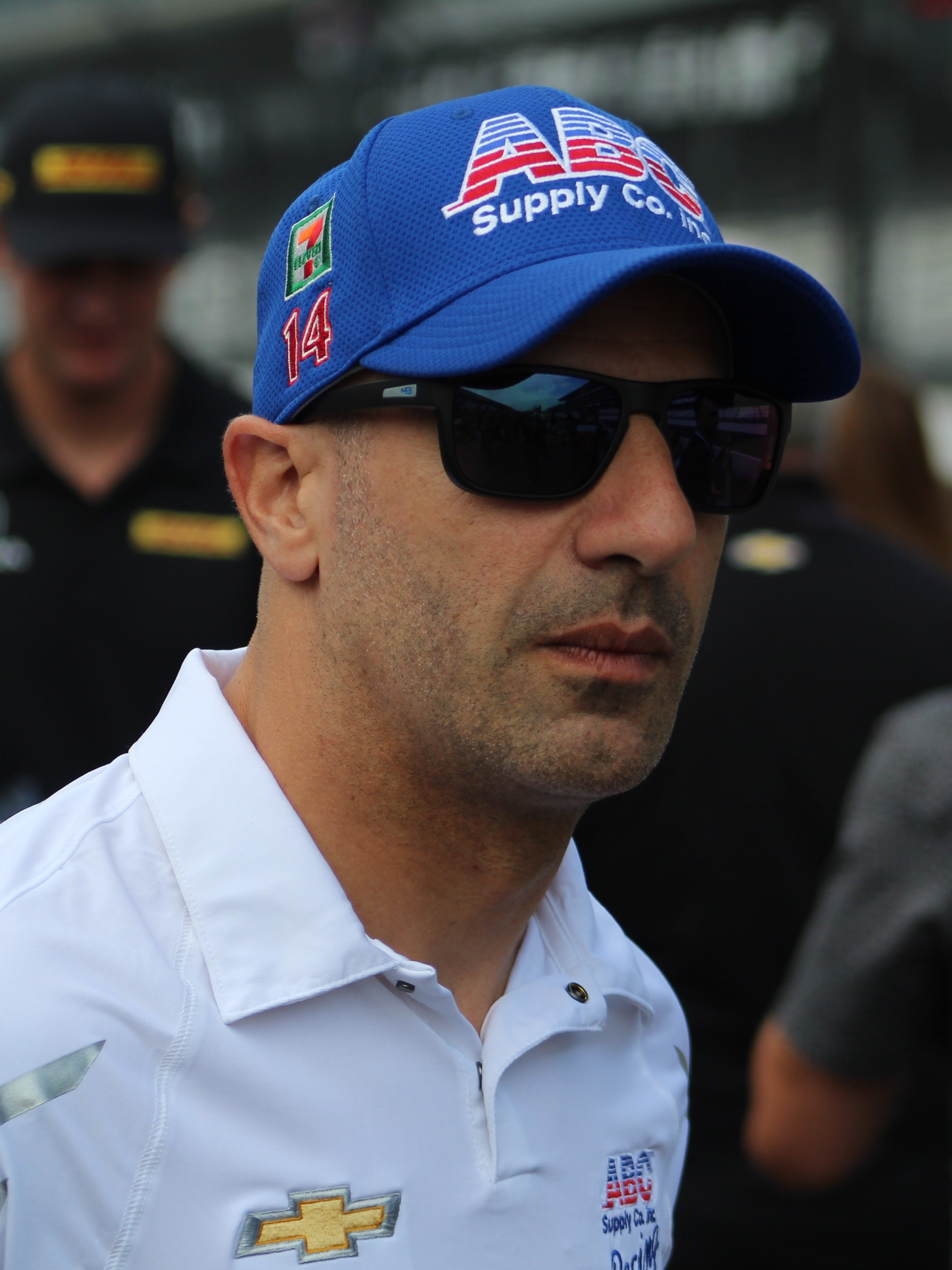
Tony Kanaan (pictured in 2018) won the race after passing teammate Marco Andretti on lap 180.

Green-flag pit stops began on lap 70, with Andretti and Franchitti making pit stops for new tires and fuel. Kanaan made his stop four laps later, handing the lead to Scheckter and Simmons, who each led one lap before entering pit road. After the pit stops had concluded, Kanaan regained the first position and held a seven-second lead over Andretti until the first caution was flown on lap 96, when debris was spotted in the third turn. During the caution period, most of the leaders made pit stops; Castroneves stopped for a front wing adjustment and Carpenter was forced to stop twice after dropping a wheel weight while exiting his pit stall. Kanaan, Franchitti, and Meira chose to stay on track and remained the leaders at the lap-108 restart. Franchitti drove left on the back stretch to take the lead from Kanaan on lap 109; two laps later, the second caution was prompted after Castroneves and Carpenter collided in the third turn, damaging the left-front suspension of Castroneves' car and the right-rear suspension of Carpenter's car. Carpenter retired from the race. Most of the leaders, with the exception of Scheckter, did not make pit stops.

Franchitti led the field back up to speed on the lap-116 restart. Kanaan drove to the left to pass Franchitti in the first turn on lap 125, but backed off. He completed the pass and reclaimed the lead on the 135th lap. The third caution was triggered two laps later when Meira, from third place, made heavy contact with the turn-three wall, ending his race. All the leaders made pit stops under this caution, with Andretti taking the lead from Franchitti on lap 141 by virtue of a quick pit stop. After Castroneves' team repaired his suspension, he returned to the race one lap later in order to gain points. Andretti led at the lap-146 restart; he was followed by Scheckter and Kanaan, the latter of whom passed Scheckter for second place the following lap. In the next 33 laps, Kanaan gradually condensed Andretti's lead from 1.1 seconds to 0.4 seconds. On lap 180, Kanaan drove to the inside line and overtook Andretti in the third turn. Hornish Jr. moved into fourth place over Herta on the 183rd lap, and Dixon pitted for tires and fuel two laps later.

The fourth (and final) caution was necessitated on lap 200 when Bucknum slid up the track and contacted the turn-four wall, dealing unfixable damage to his car. All the leaders elected to make pit stops under the caution. Kanaan led the field at the lap-209 restart, followed by Andretti and Franchitti. Hornish Jr. swiftly overtook Franchitti for the third position in the third turn. He then passed Andretti for second place three laps later. Scheckter, meanwhile, moved into third on the 217th lap. On lap 220, Kanaan's car began sputtering, igniting fears that he may run out of fuel; despite this, he maintained the lead for the final five laps and earned his seventh IndyCar Series win and the first of the season for him and his team, Andretti Green Racing. Hornish Jr. finished second, ahead of Scheckter in third, Patrick fourth, and Andretti fifth. Franchitti, Herta, Wheldon, Simmons, and Dixon completed the top ten, and Rice and Sharp were the last of the classified finishers. The race featured four cautions and eight lead changes among six different drivers. Kanaan led four times for a total of 127 laps, more than any other competitor.

=== Post-race ===
Kanaan appeared in victory lane to celebrate his win in front of a crowd of 30,610 spectators; the win earned him $121,400. Kanaan attributed his speed in the race to a recent test conducted at the track that he and his teammates participated in: "This victory proves that the Indy Pro Series test program works. I have to thank Jaime (Camara), Jonathan Klein, Dario (Franchitti) and Marco (Andretti). They did a great job testing here." He said the win felt more rewarding than clinching the 2004 series championship. Second-place finisher Hornish Jr. explained why he ran so poorly in the first half of the race: "We weren't quite handling the way we needed to be to be up there running with the leaders. We decided we would just try to save fuel, make it so we could do a two-stop race. That was the big thing for us." He also cited his teammate Castroneves' brief return to the race as an indication of how intense the championship battle had become. Scheckter, whose third-place finish marked the first top-five result for Vision Racing, stated that his last pit stop for tires helped him gain enough momentum to pass four drivers following the final restart.

After finishing fifth, Andretti said his attempt to save fuel and his ill-handling car gradually caused him to lose several positions in the final 20 laps. Sixth-place finisher Franchitti expressed disappointment, revealing that his car could only reach a certain pace before his tires would rapidly wear off; nevertheless, he congratulated Kanaan for winning. Herta, the seventh-place finisher, said he was "hanging on" in the last green-flag stint because he had been dealing with understeer and wished that he and his teammates could have held on to sweep the top four positions. Both Target Chip Ganassi Racing teammates voiced complaints about their issues throughout the weekend, with Wheldon feeling a sense of urgency in his championship battle: "From here on out, it’s pretty simple; win at all costs." The final result maintained Hornish Jr.'s lead in the Drivers' Championship with 356 points, ahead of Dixon with 331. Castroneves held onto third place with 326 points, two more than Wheldon in fourth. Kanaan, with 277 points, was tied with Meira for the fifth position with four races left in the season.

=== Race classification ===
Pos	No.	Driver	Team	Laps	Time/Retired	Grid	Points
1	11	(Brazil) Tony Kanaan	Andretti Green Racing	225	01:42:37.8319	4	53^{1}
2	6	(United States) Sam Hornish Jr.	Marlboro Team Penske	225	+1.8276	2	40
3	2	(South Africa) Tomas Scheckter	Vision Racing	225	+2.0114	8	35
4	16	(United States) Danica Patrick	Rahal Letterman Racing	225	+8.4708	14	32
5	26	(United States) Marco Andretti	Andretti Green Racing	225	+10.2611	3	30
6	27	(United Kingdom) Dario Franchitti	Andretti Green Racing	225	+11.2373	12	28
7	7	(United States) Bryan Herta	Andretti Green Racing	225	+14.1195	9	26
8	10	(United Kingdom) Dan Wheldon	Target Chip Ganassi Racing	224	+1 lap	11	24
9	17	(United States) Jeff Simmons	Rahal Letterman Racing	223	+2 laps	6	22
10	9	(New Zealand) Scott Dixon	Target Chip Ganassi Racing	223	+2 laps	10	20
11	15	(United States) Buddy Rice	Rahal Letterman Racing	221	+4 laps	13	19
12	8	(United States) Scott Sharp	Delphi Fernández Racing	219	+6 laps	16	18
13	14	(United States) Jeff Bucknum	A. J. Foyt Racing	194	Accident	18	17
14	3	(Brazil) Hélio Castroneves	Marlboro Team Penske	170	In garage	1	16
15	4	(Brazil) Vítor Meira	Panther Racing	136	Accident	5	15
16	20	(United States) Ed Carpenter	Vision Racing	109	Suspension	7	14
17	55	(Japan) Kosuke Matsuura	Super Aguri Fernández Racing	85	Steering	15	13
18	5	(Australia) Ryan Briscoe	Dreyer & Reinbold Racing	13	Handling	17	12

Notes

- ^1 — Includes three bonus points for leading the most laps.

== Championship standings after the race ==
Drivers' Championship standings
	Pos.	Driver	Points
Unchanged	1	(United States) Sam Hornish Jr.	356
Unchanged	2	(New Zealand) Scott Dixon	331 (–25)
Unchanged	3	(Brazil) Hélio Castroneves	326 (–30)
Unchanged	4	(United Kingdom) Dan Wheldon	324 (–32)
1	5	(Brazil) Tony Kanaan	277 (–79)
Sources:

- Note: Only the top five positions are included.

Previous race: 2006 Firestone Indy 200	IndyCar Series; 2006 season	Next race: 2006 Firestone Indy 400
Previous race: 2005 ABC Supply Co. / A. J. Foyt 225	ABC Supply / A. J. Foyt Indy 225	Next race: 2007 ABC Supply Company A.J. Foyt 225
