= 2006 Firestone Indy 200 =

IndyCar race held in Lebanon, Tennessee

(United States) 2006 Firestone Indy 200
Race details
Race 9 of 14 in the 2006 IndyCar season
| ← Previous race | Next race → |
- Layout of the Nashville Superspeedway circuit
- Date: July 15, 2006
- Official name: Firestone Indy 200
- Location: Nashville Superspeedway, Lebanon, Tennessee
- Course: Permanent racing facility 1.330 mi / 2.140 km
- Distance: 200 laps 266.000 mi / 428.086 km

Pole position
- Driver: (United Kingdom) Dan Wheldon (Target Chip Ganassi Racing)
- Time: 23.0210

Fastest lap
- Driver: (United Kingdom) Dan Wheldon (Target Chip Ganassi Racing)
- Time: 23.1401 (on lap 186 of 200)

Podium
- First: (New Zealand) Scott Dixon (Target Chip Ganassi Racing)
- Second: (United Kingdom) Dan Wheldon (Target Chip Ganassi Racing)
- Third: (Brazil) Vítor Meira (Panther Racing)

The 2006 Firestone Indy 200 was an IndyCar Series motor race held on July 15, 2006, in Lebanon, Tennessee at Nashville Superspeedway. It was the ninth round of the 2006 IndyCar Series and the sixth running of the event. Scott Dixon won the 200-lap race for Target Chip Ganassi Racing from the third position. Dixon's teammate Dan Wheldon finished second and Vítor Meira of Panther Racing finished third.

Sam Hornish Jr. led the Drivers' Championship by twenty points over teammate Hélio Castroneves heading into the race. Wheldon won the pole position by setting the fastest timed lap in qualifying. He led the first 57 laps before making a pit stop, giving the lead to Hornish Jr. for three laps. Wheldon regained the lead a lap later and continued leading until Hornish Jr. passed him on lap 89; he overtook Hornish Jr. five laps later. After a cycle of green-flag pit stops concluded with 67 laps remaining, Dixon moved into the lead and held it to win the race. There were three cautions and nine lead changes among five different drivers during the race.

The victory was Dixon's second of the season and sixth of his IndyCar career. After the race, Hornish Jr.'s lead in the Drivers' Championship was diminished to a measly five points over Dixon in the second position. Castroneves fell to third, while Wheldon and Meira remained fourth and fifth with five races left in the season.

== Background ==
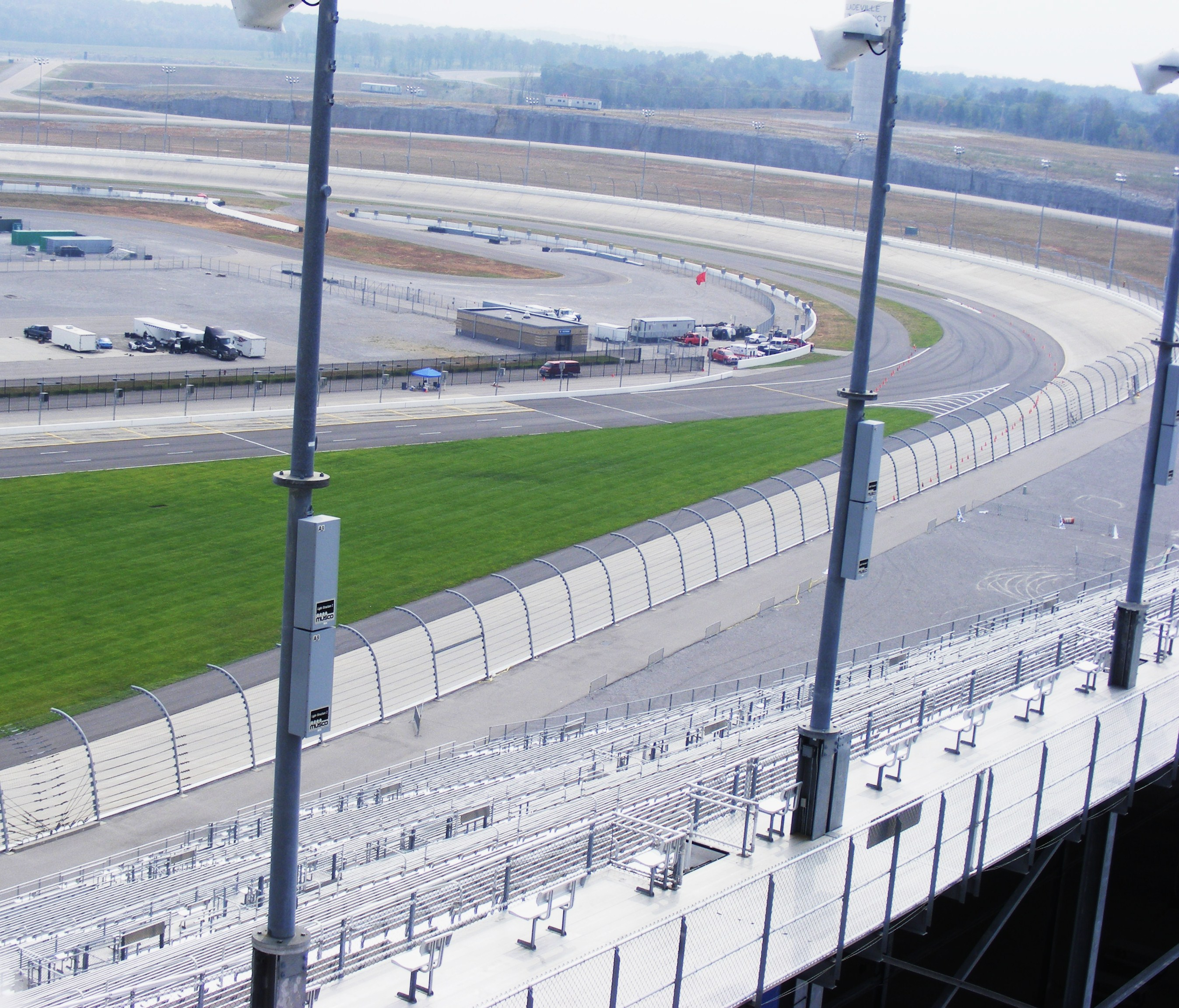
Nashville Superspeedway (pictured in 2007), where the race was held.

The Firestone Indy 200 was the ninth of 14 scheduled open-wheel races for the 2006 IndyCar Series and the sixth edition of the event dating back to 2001. It was held on July 15, 2006, in Lebanon, Tennessee, United States, at Nashville Superspeedway, a four-turn 1.33 mi (2.14 km) concrete tri-oval circuit which features 14-degree banking in the turns, 9-degree banking in the front stretch, and 6-degree banking in the back stretch, and contested over 200 laps and 266 miles (428 km). Before the race, Marlboro Team Penske driver Sam Hornish Jr. led the Drivers' Championship with 300 points, followed by teammate Hélio Castroneves with 280 and Scott Dixon with 261. Dan Wheldon was third with 257 points, thirty ahead of Vítor Meira in fifth. Dario Franchitti was the race's defending champion.

Following the previous race at Kansas Speedway, Marlboro Team Penske was forced to relocate their operations to Exeter, Pennsylvania because of the Mid-Atlantic United States flood which devastated their old race shop in Reading, Pennsylvania. In spite of this, their drivers Hornish Jr. and Castroneves both looked forward to the race at Nashville and hoped to earn their first win at the track. They, along with many other drivers, regarded Nashville Superspeedway as a "challenging" circuit due to its concrete surface, which wore tires more quickly than asphalt. Bryan Herta conversely opined that the concrete surface provided more grip, especially on a hot day, because it does not heat up as much as asphalt.

Eighteen drivers entered the race, marking the smallest field of the season thus far. Cheever Racing withdrew from IndyCar Series competition because of a lack of sponsorship. Team owner and driver Eddie Cheever was appreciative of his employees who helped him throughout the season: "We may have not had the best equipment, due to our limited budget, but we did the best with what we had. I am sorry to see these guys go, and I hope that we can be reunited again in the future." Two teams opted to swap their drivers. On July 10, A. J. Foyt Racing announced the departure of their driver Felipe Giaffone because of communication issues between Giaffone and team owner A. J. Foyt. Jeff Bucknum was later revealed to be Giaffone's replacement for the remainder of the season. Dreyer & Reinbold Racing also replaced Buddy Lazier with Ryan Briscoe, who finished third with the team earlier that season at Watkins Glen International, in three of the final six races of the season, beginning at Nashville. Team co-owner Dennis Reinbold admitted Lazier's future with the team was uncertain because they wanted to prepare for the 2007 season.

== Practice and qualifying ==
Three practice sessions were held prior to the race on Saturday, all on Friday. The first two sessions lasted 90 minutes and were divided into two groups, both of which received 45 minutes of track time, while the third session lasted 30 minutes. Tony Kanaan led the first practice session on Friday morning with a time of 23.2020 seconds, besting Wheldon, Marco Andretti, Hornish Jr., and Kosuke Matsuura. Later that afternoon, Wheldon was fastest in the second practice session with a time of 23.1114 seconds; positions second through fifth were held by Hornish Jr., Castroneves, Franchitti, and Meira. After Dixon's gearbox failed early in the session, his team managed to repair it.

Qualifying was held ninety minutes after the second practice session concluded. Each driver was required to complete two timed laps, with the quicker of the two determining their starting position. Wheldon clinched his second pole position of the season and the fourth of his career with a time of 23.0210 seconds. He was trailed by Hornish Jr., whose lap was 0.1059 seconds slower. Dixon experienced more gearbox issues during his first warm-up lap, which were quickly alleviated by his team; he qualified third, ahead of Castroneves in fourth and Franchitti in fifth. Kanaan, Meira, Scott Sharp, Tomas Scheckter, and Danica Patrick took the remaining positions inside the top ten, and Buddy Rice, Matsuura, Briscoe, Ed Carpenter, Jeff Simmons, Herta, Bucknum, and Andretti completed the starting grid. On Saturday evening, the final practice session was paced by Wheldon with a time of 23.1769 seconds; Hornish Jr., Castroneves, Kanaan, and Scheckter occupied positions second through fifth.

=== Qualifying classification ===
| Pos | No. | Driver | Team | Time | Speed | Final grid |
|---|---|---|---|---|---|---|
| 1 | 10 | (United Kingdom) Dan Wheldon | Target Chip Ganassi Racing | 23.0210 | 203.293 | 1 |
| 2 | 6 | (United States) Sam Hornish Jr. | Marlboro Team Penske | 23.1269 | 202.362 | 2 |
| 3 | 9 | (New Zealand) Scott Dixon | Target Chip Ganassi Racing | 23.1461 | 202.194 | 3 |
| 4 | 3 | (Brazil) Hélio Castroneves | Marlboro Team Penske | 23.1689 | 201.995 | 4 |
| 5 | 27 | (United Kingdom) Dario Franchitti | Andretti Green Racing | 23.1803 | 201.896 | 5 |
| 6 | 11 | (Brazil) Tony Kanaan | Andretti Green Racing | 23.2111 | 201.628 | 6 |
| 7 | 4 | (Brazil) Vítor Meira | Panther Racing | 23.3046 | 200.819 | 7 |
| 8 | 8 | (United States) Scott Sharp | Delphi Fernández Racing | 23.3067 | 200.801 | 8 |
| 9 | 2 | (South Africa) Tomas Scheckter | Vision Racing | 23.3503 | 200.426 | 9 |
| 10 | 16 | (United States) Danica Patrick | Rahal Letterman Racing | 23.3669 | 200.283 | 10 |
| 11 | 15 | (United States) Buddy Rice | Rahal Letterman Racing | 23.3680 | 200.274 | 11 |
| 12 | 55 | (Japan) Kosuke Matsuura | Super Aguri Fernández Racing | 23.4300 | 199.744 | 12 |
| 13 | 5 | (Australia) Ryan Briscoe | Dreyer & Reinbold Racing | 23.4461 | 199.607 | 13 |
| 14 | 20 | (United States) Ed Carpenter | Vision Racing | 23.4572 | 199.512 | 14 |
| 15 | 17 | (United States) Jeff Simmons | Rahal Letterman Racing | 23.4637 | 199.457 | 15 |
| 16 | 7 | (United States) Bryan Herta | Andretti Green Racing | 23.4721 | 199.386 | 16 |
| 17 | 14 | (United States) Jeff Bucknum | A. J. Foyt Racing | 23.5828 | 198.450 | 17 |
| 18 | 26 | (United States) Marco Andretti | Andretti Green Racing | 23.5993 | 198.311 | 18 |

== Race ==
Live coverage of the race began on Saturday at 8:00 PM Central Daylight Time (CDT) in the United States on ESPN. Commentary was provided by Marty Reid, Rusty Wallace, and Scott Goodyear. Around the start of the race, weather conditions were mostly sunny, with air temperatures reaching 86 °F (30 °C) and track temperatures measuring at 93 °F (34 °C). Daylong threats of rainfall were subsided once darkness fell. Andrew Firestone, television personality of The Bachelor and great-grandson of Firestone founder Harvey S. Firestone, commanded the drivers to start their engines and Johnny Rutherford, three-time Indianapolis 500 winner, drove the pace car. When the race began, Wheldon maintained his pole position advantage and led the first lap, while Kanaan passed three drivers to take third place and Castroneves fell to the ninth position after he and Dixon made slight contact in the second turn.

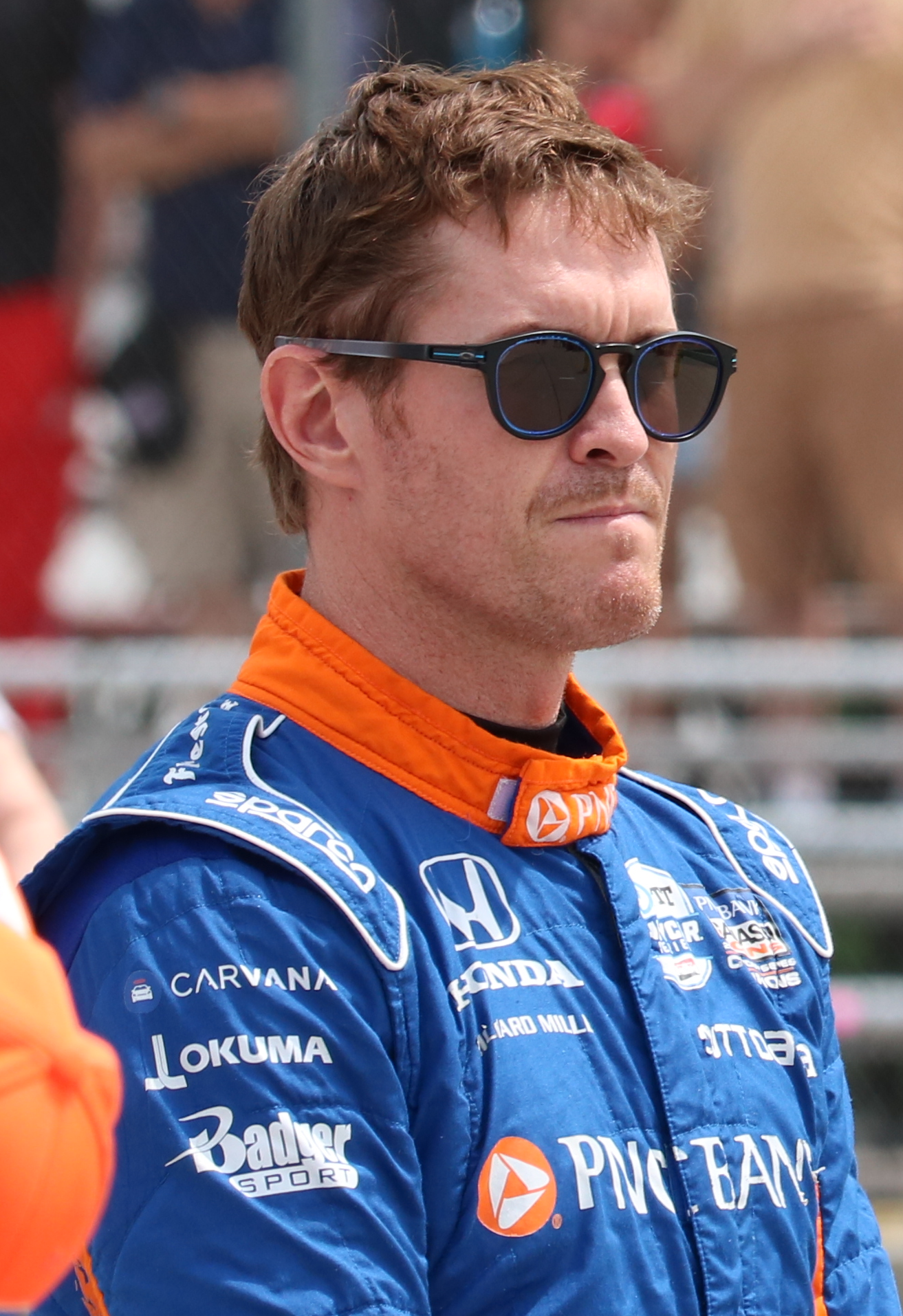
Scott Dixon (pictured in 2021) won the race after leading the final 67 laps.

Wheldon held onto the lead for the first 57 laps. Meanwhile, on the 45th lap, Kanaan entered pit road from third for an apparent electrical issue. After his team swapped out several faulty electrical components, he returned to the track seventeen laps behind the leader. The first round of green-flag pit stops commenced on lap 57. Wheldon, Andretti, and Scheckter made pit stops on lap 58, handing the lead to Hornish Jr. Wheldon retained the lead once pit stops ended on lap 61. The first caution of the race was flown three laps later when Rice lost power and slowed on the back stretch. With no drivers choosing to make pit stops, Wheldon led the field back up to speed on the lap-73 restart. Sixteen laps later, Hornish Jr. drove to the inside line and overtook Wheldon for the lead. Wheldon attained Hornish Jr.'s draft and passed him back in the first turn on lap 94.

Green-flag pit stops began for the second time on lap 116 when Herta made a pit stop for tires and fuel. By lap 120, Wheldon lengthened the gap between him and Hornish Jr. to 0.38 seconds. Wheldon gave up the lead to Hornish Jr. four laps later during the second bout of green-flag pit stops. Hornish Jr. retained the lead for two laps before making a pit stop on the 126th lap, handing the lead to Meira for a lap. Dixon took the lead for two laps until he made his stop, ceding the lead to Matsuura. On lap 130, the caution was issued for the second time when Hornish Jr. slid up the track and contacted the outside and inside walls at the exit of turn two; he resultantly retired from the race. Several drivers, include race leader Matsuura, made their pit stops during the caution, giving the lead to Dixon for the restart on lap 138. By the 160th lap, Dixon slightly expanded his lead to 0.26 seconds over teammate Wheldon. The third (and final) caution was prompted four laps later after Matsuura crashed into the turn-four wall from the sixth position. During this caution, Franchitti took on a new set of tires and fuel, while Castroneves' team only fueled his car.

Dixon led on the lap-174 restart and was followed by Wheldon and Meira, the latter of whom passed Wheldon for second place that same lap. Meira had narrowed the deficit to Dixon to 0.14 seconds by lap 180, but over the following ten laps, Dixon reestablished a 0.4-second advantage. Wheldon took back the second position from Meira a lap later and remained in hot pursuit of Dixon for the remaining nine laps. On the final lap, Wheldon attempted to pass Dixon on the high side of the track to no avail; he finished second to Dixon, who earned his sixth career IndyCar win and the last of his two victories of the season. Dixon and Wheldon's first- and second-place finishes marked Target Chip Ganassi Racing's first 1-2 sweep since joining the IndyCar Series in 2003. Meira finished third, ahead of Patrick in fourth and Castroneves in fifth. Franchitti, Simmons, Andretti, Briscoe, and Carpenter completed the top-ten positions, and Herta was the last of the classified finishers. The race had a total of three cautions and nine lead changes between five different drivers. Wheldon led three times for 115 total laps, more than any other driver; because of this, he earned three bonus points.

=== Post-race ===
Dixon appeared in victory lane to celebrate his second win of the season, which earned him $121,400. Dixon was happy with his and his teammate Wheldon's finishes and described how he overcame adversities: "Today, I don’t think we had the fastest car, but we were consistent in traffic. We actually crashed into Hélio (Castroneves) in turn two on the start and bent the front a bit. It was bit slow, but the guys did a great job in the pits and the fuel mileage was awesome." Second-place finisher Wheldon expressed jubilancy for Dixon and his team: "It is a fantastic evening for Target Chip Ganassi Racing and everyone involved. It's good to see Scott (Dixon) back on top." He regarded the race as "entertaining" and "intense." Third-place finisher Meira was pleased with his performance in the race and desired to earn his first IndyCar win. Meira also felt that his car was fastest during the first five laps of a green-flag stint.

After tying her career-best finish of fourth, Patrick attributed the finish to the hard labor of her crew: "The Argent crew has been working hard to get the new Dallara chassis competitive and tonight we saw the result of that work. I am happy for the crew and the team overall." She hoped to build upon the new momentum that the finish brought her and her team. Sixth-place finisher Franchitti insinuated Patrick should have been handed a black flag for an aggressive block late in the race: "They talk about the black-flag rule all the time in the drivers' meeting. Brian (Barnhart) specifically said it before this race, but during the race, it doesn't seem to happen. It's very disappointing. We need to do something about it." Patrick insisted that she was simply protecting the bottom line. Patrick's Rahal Letterman Racing teammate Simmons, whose seventh-place finish was the best of his career thus far, stated that his car became "competitive" once his team adjusted its issues with understeer.

Hornish Jr. explained that his car drove through the track's marbles, resulting in his crash: "We got out after our last pit stop and I was running behind the No. 4 car. I was trying to get a run on him and the car just pushed up into the marbles. At that point, there really wasn't anything I could do." The final result kept Hornish Jr. in the lead of the Drivers' Championship with 316 points; however, his gap over second-place, which had been taken by Dixon, dwindled to five points. Castroneves fell to third with 310 points, while Wheldon and Meira maintained their fourth and fifth positions with 300 and 262 points, respectively, with five races remaining in the season.

=== Race classification ===
| Pos | No. | Driver | Team | Laps | Time/Retired | Grid | Pts. |
|---|---|---|---|---|---|---|---|
| 1 | 9 | (New Zealand) Scott Dixon | Target Chip Ganassi Racing | 200 | 01:36:46.2751 | 3 | 50 |
| 2 | 10 | (United Kingdom) Dan Wheldon | Target Chip Ganassi Racing | 200 | +0.1176 | 1 | 43^{1} |
| 3 | 4 | (Brazil) Vítor Meira | Panther Racing | 200 | +1.2756 | 7 | 35 |
| 4 | 16 | (United States) Danica Patrick | Rahal Letterman Racing | 200 | +2.5019 | 10 | 32 |
| 5 | 3 | (Brazil) Hélio Castroneves | Marlboro Team Penske | 200 | +3.5647 | 4 | 30 |
| 6 | 27 | (United Kingdom) Dario Franchitti | Andretti Green Racing | 200 | +11.9449 | 5 | 28 |
| 7 | 17 | (United States) Jeff Simmons | Rahal Letterman Racing | 199 | +1 lap | 15 | 26 |
| 8 | 26 | (United States) Marco Andretti | Andretti Green Racing | 199 | +1 lap | 18 | 24 |
| 9 | 5 | (Australia) Ryan Briscoe | Dreyer & Reinbold Racing | 199 | +1 lap | 13 | 22 |
| 10 | 20 | (United States) Ed Carpenter | Vision Racing | 198 | +2 laps | 14 | 20 |
| 11 | 7 | (United States) Bryan Herta | Andretti Green Racing | 198 | +2 laps | 16 | 19 |
| 12 | 11 | (Brazil) Tony Kanaan | Andretti Green Racing | 170 | In pits | 6 | 18 |
| 13 | 55 | (Japan) Kosuke Matsuura | Super Aguri Fernández Racing | 162 | Accident | 12 | 17 |
| 14 | 6 | (United States) Sam Hornish Jr. | Marlboro Team Penske | 128 | Accident | 2 | 16 |
| 15 | 2 | (South Africa) Tomas Scheckter | Vision Racing | 121 | Half shaft | 9 | 15 |
| 16 | 15 | (United States) Buddy Rice | Rahal Letterman Racing | 61 | Electrical | 11 | 14 |
| 17 | 8 | (United States) Scott Sharp | Delphi Fernández Racing | 58 | Fuel pressure | 8 | 13 |
| 18 | 14 | (United States) Jeff Bucknum | A. J. Foyt Racing | 36 | Handling | 17 | 12 |

Notes

- ^1 — Includes three bonus points for leading the most laps.

== Championship standings after the race ==
Drivers' Championship standings
| | Pos. | Driver | Points |
|---|---|---|---|
| Unchanged | 1 | (United States) Sam Hornish Jr. | 316 |
| 1 | 2 | (New Zealand) Scott Dixon | 311 (–5) |
| 1 | 3 | (Brazil) Hélio Castroneves | 310 (–6) |
| Unchanged | 4 | (United Kingdom) Dan Wheldon | 300 (–16) |
| Unchanged | 5 | (Brazil) Vítor Meira | 262 (–54) |
Sources:

- Note: Only the top five positions are included.

| Previous race: 2006 Kansas Lottery Indy 300 | IndyCar Series; 2006 season | Next race: 2006 ABC Supply / A. J. Foyt Indy 225 |
| Previous race: 2005 Firestone Indy 200 | Firestone Indy 200 | Next race: 2007 Firestone Indy 200 |
