= Kosuke Matsuura =

Japanese racing driver (born 1979)

Kosuke Matsuura 松浦孝亮
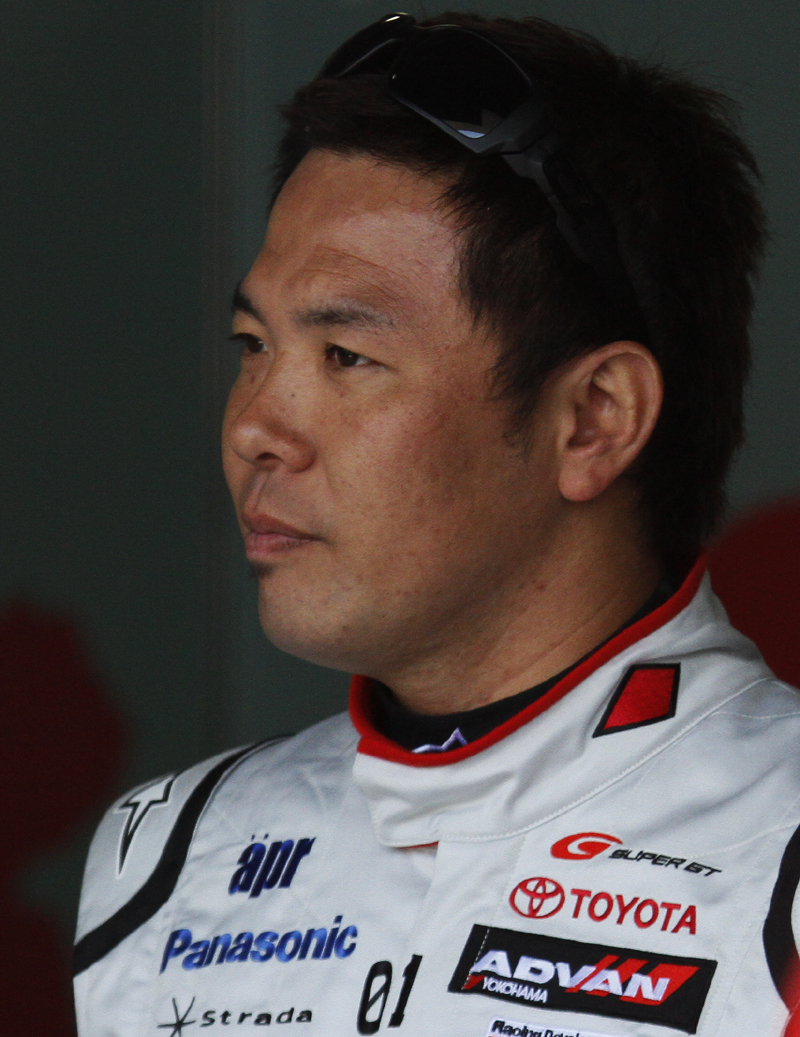
- Matsuura in 2010
- Nationality: (Japan) Japanese
- Born: 4 September 1979 (age 47) Nagoya, Aichi, Japan

IndyCar Series
- Years active: 2004-2007, 2009
- Teams: Conquest; Aguri Panther; Aguri Fernandez
- Starts: 65
- Wins: 0
- Poles: 0
- Best finish: 13th in 2006

Previous series
- 2003 2001-2002 2000: Formula Renault V6 Eurocup; German Formula 3 Formula Dream

Championship titles
- 2000: Formula Dream

Awards
- 2004 2004: IndyCar Rookie of the Year; Indy 500 Rookie of the Year

Kosuke Matsuura (松浦 孝亮, Matsūra Kōsuke; born September 4, 1979) is a Japanese race car driver currently competing in the Super GT series. He previously competed in the Formula Nippon and IRL IndyCar Series.

== Early career ==
After winning the Japanese Formula Dream Championship in 2000, Matsuura attracted the attention of former Formula One driver Aguri Suzuki as a teenager and was placed into Suzuki's driver development program, the ARTA Project. He went on to finish second in the 2002 German Formula Three Championship winning two races and finished third in the 2003 European Formula Renault V6 Eurocup, winning three races before replacing Roger Yasukawa at Super Aguri Fernandez Racing in the Indy Racing League IndyCar Series in 2004.

== IRL IndyCar Series ==
In 2004, Matsuura was the Bombardier Rookie of the Year, finishing fourteenth in points. He was also the 2004 Bank One Rookie of the Year for the 2004 Indianapolis 500.

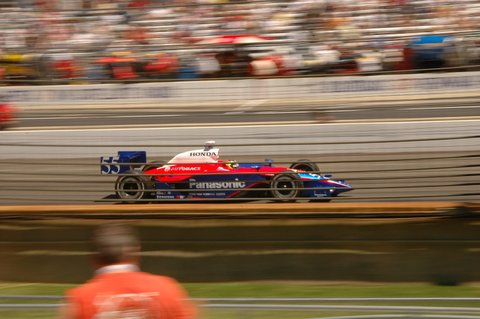
Matsuura driving in the 2005 Indianapolis 500

In 2005, Matsuura again drove for Super Aguri Fernandez Racing, and again finished fourteenth in the Championship with a best place finish of 6th in the two road course races. He continued with the team in 2006 and finished a career best thirteenth in points with a best finish of 6th.

For 2007, Autobacs Racing Team Aguri switched allegiance to Panther Racing, teaming Matsuura with Vítor Meira.

During the 2007 IndyCar Series season, Matsuura retired from six of the first eleven races and finished no better than eighth in the others. His struggles prompted speculation from media and fans that he might be dropped by Panther Racing, culminating on July 20, 2007, when Speed TV posted an article on its website stating that Matsuura would be immediately replaced by Autobacs Racing Team Aguri Indy Pro Series driver Hideki Mutoh. While the report was incorrect and the article has since been removed, it did little to stop speculation that Matsuura would be replaced following the 2007 season.

On August 5, 2007, Matsuura matched a career best with a fourth place finish at the Firestone Indy 400 at Michigan. This prompted Indianapolis Motor Speedway Radio Network play-by-play Mike King to suggest that the finish may help him stay in IndyCar Series for the 2008 season. The finish, however, only came in the aftermath of his avoiding a major back straightaway incident involving most of the front half of the field.

For 2008, after longtime sponsors Panasonic switched their sponsorship to Hideki Mutoh of the Andretti Green Racing team in the IndyCar Series, Matsuura returned to Japan to compete in the Formula Nippon Series.

In August 2009, Conquest Racing announced that Matsuura would drive for them at the 2009 Indy Japan 300 in a car sponsored by CLICK Securities Inc. Matsuura finished seventeenth for the part-time team.

== Motorsports career results ==
=== American Open-Wheel racing results ===
(key) (Races in italics indicate fastest lap)

==== IndyCar Series ====
Year	Team	No.	Chassis	Engine	1	2	3	4	5	6	7	8	9	10	11	12	13	14	15	16	17	Rank	Points	Ref
2004	Super Aguri Fernandez Racing	55	G-Force GF09B	Honda HI4R V8	HMS; 11	PHX; 11	MOT; 8	INDY; 11	TXS; 16	RIR; 14	KAN; 18	NSH; 9	MIL; 10	MIS; 17	KTY; 4	PPI; 13	NZR; 21	CHI; 21	FON; 13	TX2; 19		14th	280	
2005	Super Aguri Fernandez Racing	55	Panoz GF09C	Honda HI5R V8	HMS; 12	PHX; 10	STP; 13	MOT; 9	INDY; 17	TXS; 7	RIR; 9	KAN; 20	NSH; 14	MIL; 11	MIS; 16	KTY; 8	PPI; 13	SNM; 6	CHI; 23	WGL; 6	FON; 19	14th	320	
2006	Super Aguri Fernandez Racing	55	Dallara IR-05	Honda HI6R V8	HMS; 6	STP; 7	MOT; 7	INDY; 15	WGL; 18	TXS; 8	RIR; 12	KAN; 8	NSH; 13	MIL; 17	MIS; 9	KTY; 19	SNM; 13	CHI; 11				13th	273	
2007	Aguri Panther Racing	55	Dallara IR-05	Honda HI7R V8	HMS; 16	STP; 17	MOT; 18	KAN; 18	INDY; 16	MIL; 11	TXS; 9	IOW; 15	RIR; 17	WGL; 8	NSH; 16	MDO; 12	MIS; 4	KTY; 11	SNM; 10	DET; 5	CHI; 17	16th	303	
2009	Conquest Racing	34	Dallara IR-05	Honda HI7R V8	STP	LBH	KAN	INDY	MIL	TXS	IOW	RIR	WGL	TOR	EDM	KTY	MDO	SNM	CHI	MOT; 17	HMS	36th	13	

Years	Teams	Races	Poles	Wins	Podiums (non-win)	Top 10s (non-podium)	Indianapolis 500 wins	Championships
5	3	65	0	0	0	22	0	0

==== Indianapolis 500 ====
Year	Chassis	Engine	Start	Finish	Team
2004	G-Force	Honda	9	11	Super Aguri Fernandez Racing
2005	Panoz	Honda	8	17	Super Aguri Fernandez Racing
2006	Dallara	Honda	7	15	Super Aguri Fernandez Racing
2007	Dallara	Honda	17	16	Super Aguri/Panther

=== Complete Formula Nippon Results ===
(key) (Races in bold indicate pole position) (Races in italics indicate fastest lap)

Year	Entrant	1	2	3	4	5	6	7	8	9	10	11	DC	Points
2008	Dandelion Racing	FUJ; 12	SUZ; 16	MOT; 12	OKA; 13	SUZ1; 9	SUZ2; Ret	MOT1; 10	MOT2; 6	FUJ1; 8	**FUJ2**; 1	SUG; 13	18th	3.5

=== Complete Super GT results ===
Year	Team	Car	Class	1	2	3	4	5	6	7	8	9	DC	Pts
2008	Team Kunimitsu	Honda NSX	GT500	SUZ	OKA	FUJ	SEP	SUG	SUZ; 2	MOT	AUT	FUJ	19th	19
2009	Team Kunimitsu	Honda NSX	GT500	OKA	SUZ	FUJ; 11	SEP	SUG	SUZ	FUJ	AUT; 6	MOT	17th	5
2010	apr	Toyota Corolla Axio	GT300	SUZ; Ret	OKA; 5	FUJ; 9	SEP; 8	SUG; 3	SUZ; Ret	FUJ; C	MOT; 19		10th	22
2011	Autobacs Racing Team Aguri	ASL Garaiya	GT300	OKA; 20	FUJ; 6	SEP; 5	SUG; 3	SUZ; 20	FUJ; 12	AUT; 13	MOT; 7		12th	26
2012	Autobacs Racing Team Aguri	ASL Garaiya	GT300	OKA; 6	FUJ; 4	SEP; 9	SUG; 9	SUZ; 4	FUJ; 5	AUT; 17	MOT; 21		9th	33
2013	Autobacs Racing Team Aguri	Honda HSV-010 GT	GT500	OKA; 9	FUJ; 8	SEP; 8	SUG; 1	SUZ; 12	FUJ; 8	AUT; 14	MOT; 15		11th	31
2014	Autobacs Racing Team Aguri	Honda NSX-GT	GT500	OKA; 8	FUJ; Ret	AUT; Ret	SUG; 15	FUJ; 10	SUZ; 4	BUR; Ret	MOT; 12		16th	14
2015	Autobacs Racing Team Aguri	Honda NSX-GT	GT500	OKA; 4	FUJ; 13	CHA; Ret	FUJ; Ret	SUZ; 10	SUG; 12	AUT; 14	MOT; 11		14th	10
2016	Autobacs Racing Team Aguri	Honda NSX-GT	GT500	OKA; Ret	FUJ; 6	SUG; 14	FUJ; 6	SUZ; 9	CHA; 8	MOT; 11	MOT; 13		16th	16
2017	Nakajima Racing	Honda NSX-GT	GT500	OKA; 12	FUJ; 13	AUT; 12	SUG; 8	FUJ; 12	SUZ; 1	BUR; 8	MOT; 10		11th	32
2018	Nakajima Racing	Honda NSX-GT	GT500	OKA; 15	FUJ; Ret	SUZ; 10	BUR; 9	FUJ; 13	SUG; 13	AUT; 10	MOT; 12		19th	4
2019	Team UpGarage	Honda NSX GT3 Evo	GT300	OKA; 11	FUJ; 12	SUZ; 15	CHA; 24	FUJ; 4	SUG; 9	AUT; 10	MOT; 19		22nd	13
2020	Team UpGarage	Honda NSX GT3 Evo	GT300	FUJ 1; 22	FUJ 2; 18	SUZ 1; 2	MOT 1; 14	FUJ 3; 18	SUZ 2 Ret	MOT 2; 16	FUJ 4; 25		15th	15
2021	JLOC	Lamborghini Huracán GT3 Evo	GT300	OKA; 21	FSW; 15	TRM; Ret	SUZ; 16	SUG; 4	AUT; 25	TRM; Ret	FSW; 15		20th	8
2022	JLOC	Lamborghini Huracán GT3 Evo	GT300	OKA; 8	FSW; 12	SUZ; 16	FSW; 8	SUZ; 9	SUG; 19	AUT; 11	TRM; 2		15th	23
2023	JLOC	Lamborghini Huracán GT3 Evo	GT300	OKA; 7	FSW; Ret	SUZ; 23	FSW; 16	SUZ; 2	SUG; 19	AUT; 19	TRM; 21		14th	19
2024	JLOC	Lamborghini Huracán GT3 Evo	GT300	OKA; 7	FSW; 8	SUZ; 21	FSW; 6^{2}						11th	26
2024	JLOC	Lamborghini Huracán GT3 Evo 2	GT300					SUG; 7	AUT; 13	MOT; 4	SUZ; Ret		11th	26
2025	JLOC	Lamborghini Huracán GT3 Evo 2	GT300	OKA; 7	FUJ; 25	SEP; 9	FS1; 21	FS2 (14)	SUZ; 16	SUG; 18	AUT; 9	MOT; 11	20th	29
2026	JLOC	Lamborghini Huracán GT3 Evo 2	GT300	OKA; 15	FUJ; 12	FUJ; 25	SUZ; 29†	SUG; 7	AUT; 18	MOT; 7	MOT; 14		26th	25

Awards and achievements
Preceded by Toranosuke Takagi	Indianapolis 500; Rookie of the Year; 2004	Succeeded by Danica Patrick
Preceded by Dan Wheldon	IndyCar Series; Rookie of the Year; 2004	Succeeded by Danica Patrick
