= 2006 Firestone Indy 400 =

IndyCar race held in Brooklyn, Michigan

(United States) 2006 Firestone Indy 400
Race details
Race 11 of 14 in the 2006 IndyCar season
← Previous race	Next race →
- Date: July 30, 2006
- Official name: Firestone Indy 400
- Location: Michigan International Speedway, Brooklyn, Michigan
- Course: Permanent racing facility 2.000 mi / 3.219 km
- Distance: 200 laps 400 mi / 643.738 km

Pole position
- Driver: (Brazil) Hélio Castroneves (Marlboro Team Penske)
- Time: 33.2138

Fastest lap
- Driver: (Japan) Kosuke Matsuura (Super Aguri Fernández Racing)
- Time: 33.2737 (on lap 7 of 200)

Podium
- First: (Brazil) Hélio Castroneves (Marlboro Team Penske)
- Second: (Brazil) Vítor Meira (Panther Racing)
- Third: (United Kingdom) Dan Wheldon (Target Chip Ganassi Racing)

The 2006 Firestone Indy 400 was an IndyCar Series motor race held on July 30, 2006, in Brooklyn, Michigan at Michigan International Speedway. It was the eleventh round of the 2006 IndyCar Series and the fifth running of the event. Marlboro Team Penske driver Hélio Castroneves won the 200-lap race. Panther Racing's Vítor Meira finished second and Dan Wheldon of Target Chip Ganassi Racing finished third.

Castroneves won the pole position by posting the fastest lap of qualifying. After rainfall delayed the start of the race by two-and-a-half hours, Castroneves' teammate Sam Hornish Jr. took the first position on lap 4 and maintained the lead until making a pit stop on the 41st lap. From this point on, Hornish Jr. dealt with engine issues that forced him to retire. Meira then became the main contender for the win, leading a race-high 75 laps, but Castroneves ultimately overtook him for the win after the final cycle of green-flag pit stops ended. The victory was the eleventh of Castroneves' IndyCar career.

After the race, Castroneves took the Drivers' Championship lead, eight points ahead of teammate Hornish Jr. and seventeen ahead of Wheldon. Scott Dixon, who finished two laps down after running out of fuel early in the race, fell to fourth, while Meira broke his tie with Tony Kanaan for fifth with three races left in the season.

== Background ==
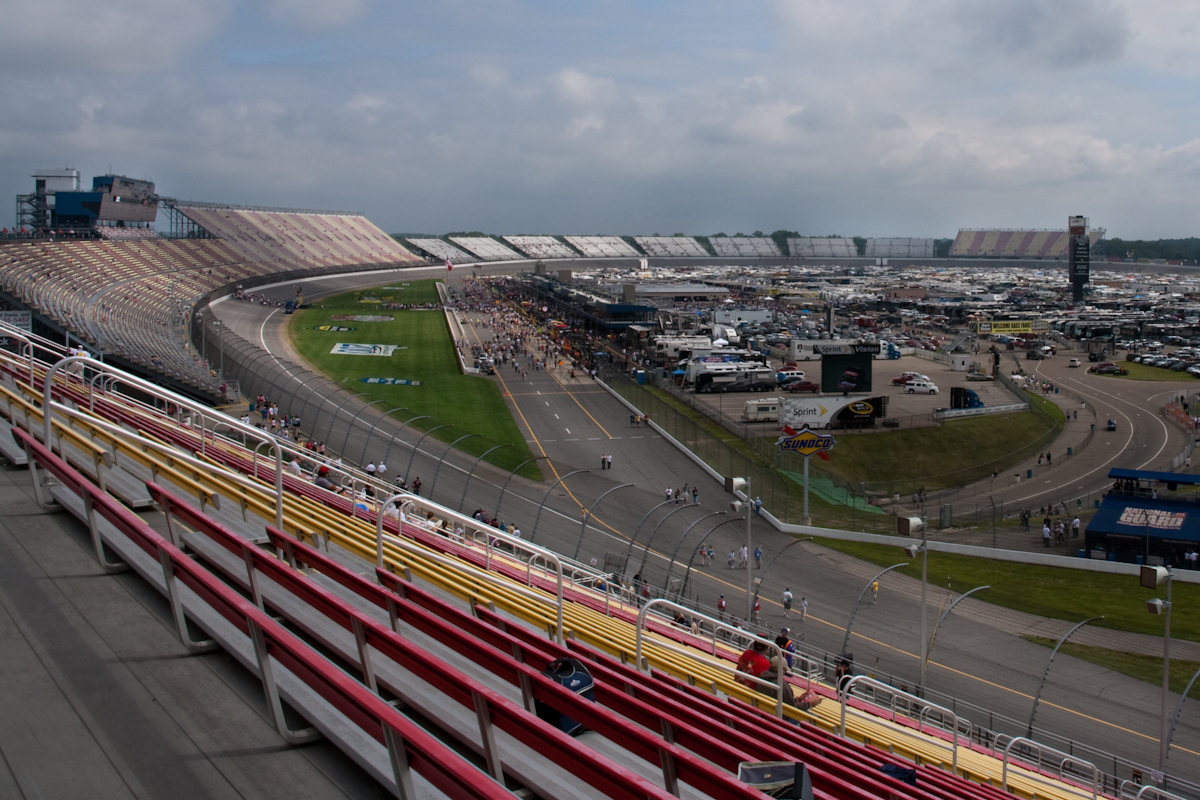
Michigan International Speedway (pictured in 2010), where the race was held.

The Firestone Indy 400 was the 11th of 14 scheduled open-wheel races for the 2006 IndyCar Series and the fifth edition of the event dating back to 2002. It was held on July 30, 2006, in Brooklyn, Michigan, United States, at Michigan International Speedway, a four-turn 2 mi (3.2 km) asphalt tri-oval which features 18-degree banking in the turns, 12-degree banking in the front stretch, and 5-degree banking in the back stretch, and contested over 200 laps and 400 miles (640 km). Before the race, Marlboro Team Penske driver Sam Hornish Jr. led the Drivers' Championship with 356 points, ahead of second-place driver Scott Dixon with 331. Hélio Castroneves was third with 326 points, two more than Dan Wheldon in fourth. Tony Kanaan and Vítor Meira were tied for fifth with 277 points each. Bryan Herta was the race's defending champion.

After winning the preceding ABC Supply / A. J. Foyt Indy 225, Kanaan said his team utilized information from a recent test conducted by him and his team at Michigan in order to prepare for the race. Championship leader Hornish Jr. was determined to earn a win at Michigan, particularly in front of the many fans from Northwest Ohio, where he was born. Castroneves compared the track's length to that of Indianapolis Motor Speedway and likened its banking to that of Kansas Speedway; according to him, these characteristics enabled drivers to race on several different racing lines. He hoped to win the race by being patient. Meira expected he would continue his season-long consistency at Michigan and hoped to gain a points advantage over the four drivers ahead of him.

One team made their season debut at the race. Roth Racing, owned by driver Marty Roth, sold their Indy Pro Series equipment in April and announced their intentions to compete full-time in the IndyCar Series, beginning with the Indianapolis 500. The team's plans were heavily sidelined when Roth crashed during qualifying for the event, resulting in him missing several races. Following a test at Michigan on June 28, Roth explained that he wanted to make the car "consistent" for the Firestone Indy 400 which he aimed to compete in. He later said he wanted to participate in the upcoming races at Kentucky Speedway and Chicagoland Speedway before racing full-time in 2007. The lone driver change of the race was that of the No. 5 Dreyer & Reinbold Racing entry. Ryan Briscoe had driven the car in the past two races, but was not scheduled to compete at Michigan. The team chose Buddy Lazier to fill in for Briscoe, marking his first start for the team since the Kansas Lottery Indy 300. Lazier said his deal to race at Michigan was materialized "last minute."

== Practice and qualifying ==
Three practice sessions preceded the race on Sunday, all of which were held on Saturday and lasted for 60 minutes with weather conditions dry throughout. Castroneves led the first practice session with a time of 33.3964 seconds, beating Wheldon by six-hundredths of a second; Hornish Jr., Scott Sharp, and Dixon were third- through fifth-quickest. Hornish Jr. lapped faster than teammate Castroneves in the second practice session, posting a top time of 33.3155 seconds. Castroneves was second, one-hundredth of a second behind Hornish Jr., while Meira, Dixon, and Wheldon were third, fourth, and fifth, respectively.

During the qualifying session, which was held on Saturday afternoon, each driver could choose to complete two or three warm-up laps before attempting up to two timed laps; the quickest of the two would determine their starting position. Castroneves earned his fifteenth career pole position with a time of 33.2138 seconds. He was joined on the grid's front row by teammate Hornish Jr., who was four-hundredths of a second slower and had the pole position until Castroneves' lap. Both Marlboro Team Penske drivers were pleased with their efforts, with Castroneves saying: "The Marlboro Team Penske team is in a great atmosphere right now. Sam and I have been sharing information, and I think it's been benefiting both of us." Kanaan qualified third, with Ed Carpenter fourth in his career-best starting position. Dixon, Meira, Dario Franchitti, Tomas Scheckter, Wheldon, and Buddy Rice rounded out the top ten positions, and Danica Patrick, Herta, Sharp, Kosuke Matsuura, Lazier, Jeff Simmons, Roth, Jeff Bucknum, and Marco Andretti completed the starting grid.

Hornish Jr. led the final practice session with a time of 33.3964 seconds, five-hundredths of a second quicker than second-place driver Castroneves. Wheldon, Dixon, and Scheckter occupied positions third through fifth. The session ended four minutes early when Rice ran out of fuel and parked his car in between the third and fourth turns.

=== Qualifying classification ===
Pos	No.	Driver	Team	Time	Speed	Final grid
1	3	(Brazil) Hélio Castroneves	Marlboro Team Penske	33.2138	216.777	1
2	6	(United States) Sam Hornish Jr.	Marlboro Team Penske	33.2615	216.466	2
3	11	(Brazil) Tony Kanaan	Andretti Green Racing	33.5253	214.763	3
4	20	(United States) Ed Carpenter	Vision Racing	33.5602	214.540	4
5	9	(New Zealand) Scott Dixon	Target Chip Ganassi Racing	33.6020	214.273	5
6	4	(Brazil) Vítor Meira	Panther Racing	33.6182	214.170	6
7	27	(United Kingdom) Dario Franchitti	Andretti Green Racing	33.6683	213.851	7
8	2	(South Africa) Tomas Scheckter	Vision Racing	33.6881	213.725	8
9	10	(United Kingdom) Dan Wheldon	Target Chip Ganassi Racing	33.6931	213.694	9
10	15	(United States) Buddy Rice	Rahal Letterman Racing	33.7315	213.450	10
11	16	(United States) Danica Patrick	Rahal Letterman Racing	33.7462	213.357	11
12	7	(United States) Bryan Herta	Andretti Green Racing	33.7700	213.207	12
13	8	(United States) Scott Sharp	Delphi Fernández Racing	33.7768	213.164	13
14	55	(Japan) Kosuke Matsuura	Super Aguri Fernández Racing	33.8408	212.761	14
15	5	(United States) Buddy Lazier	Dreyer & Reinbold Racing	33.9226	212.248	15
16	17	(United States) Jeff Simmons	Rahal Letterman Racing	34.0119	211.691	16
17	25	(Canada) Marty Roth	Roth Racing	34.2039	210.502	17
18	14	(United States) Jeff Bucknum	A. J. Foyt Racing	34.2286	210.350	18
19	26	(United States) Marco Andretti	Andretti Green Racing	34.3043	209.886	19

== Race ==
The race was scheduled to begin at 3:30 PM EDT (UTC−04:00); however, all pre-race activities were halted for 2 hours and 30 minutes after significant rainfall impacted the track at around 2:50 PM. The long postponement affected the live coverage of the race. It was originally due to air on ABC, but after exceeding the network's television window, live coverage was shifted to ABC's sister networks ESPN and ESPN2. Commentary was provided by Marty Reid, Rusty Wallace, and Scott Goodyear. When the track was completely dried, weather conditions had become partially cloudy, with air temperatures at 77 °F (25 °C) and track temperatures at 98 °F (37 °C). Firestone OEM president Mike Martini gave the command for drivers to start their engines and three-time Indianapolis 500 winner Johnny Rutherford drove the pace car, which led the field under the caution flag in the first two laps because of a moist track surface.

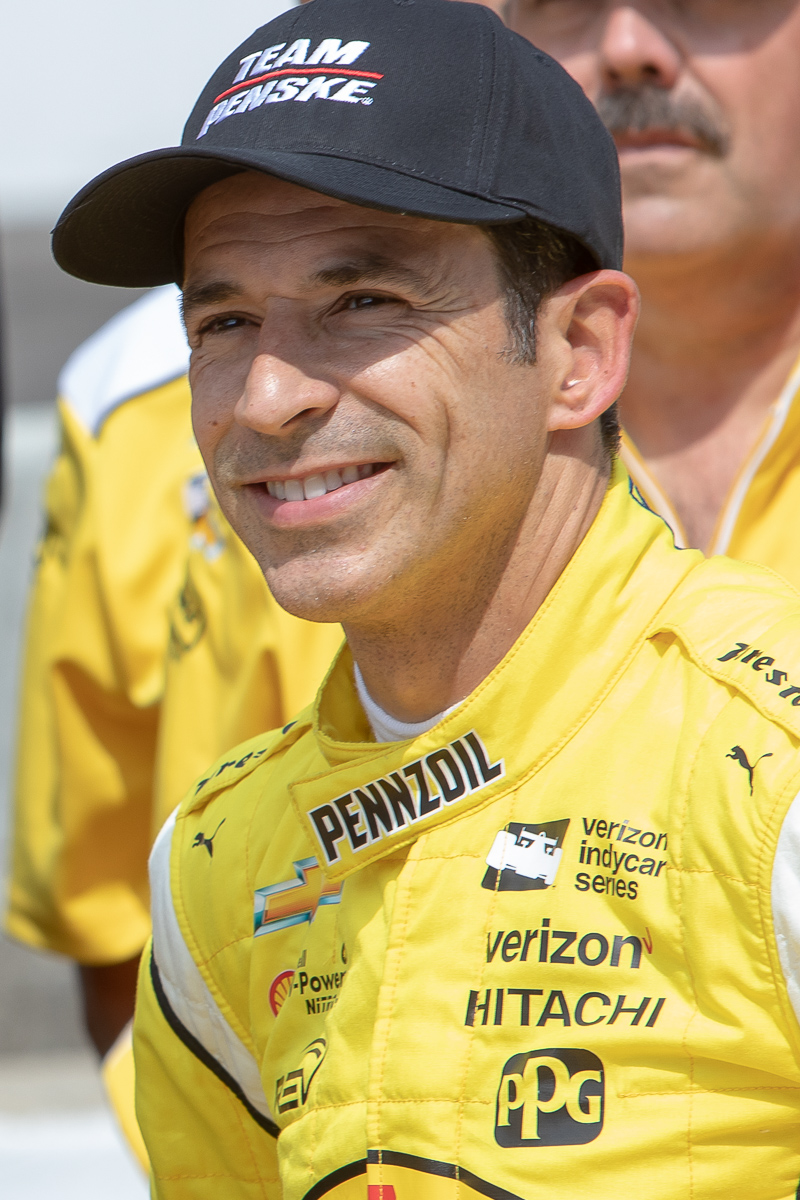
Hélio Castroneves (pictured in 2018) led 61 laps and won the race.

On lap 4, Hornish Jr. drove up the track and passed Castroneves on the back stretch. Castroneves remained in Hornish Jr.'s trail as part of a fuel-saving strategy for the next 37 laps, while Wheldon climbed to third place and Kanaan, Scheckter, Carpenter, and Meira engaged in a tight battle for the fourth position. Green-flag pit stops began on the 40th lap, with Hornish Jr. and Castroneves stopping a lap later, giving the lead to Wheldon. On lap 44, the second caution was issued after Roth's car ran out of fuel on the back stretch. Dixon suffered the same misfortune from second place one lap later, as he and teammate Wheldon were making their way into pit road. Dixon was towed into his pit stall and lost two laps; Wheldon made his stop on the 46th lap and conceded the lead to Matsuura. Three laps later, Hornish Jr., who had been relegated to tenth place, entered pit road with an overheating engine. He rejoined the race in 17th, losing a lap in the process.

Matsuura led the field back up to speed on the lap-52 restart, though he was quickly overtaken by Herta. Meira, meanwhile, climbed from the fifth position to pass Herta for the lead on lap 54. Over the next 34 laps, by which point Meira held a 2.2-second lead, Hornish Jr. made pit stops on laps 59 and 73 before retiring from the race with persistent engine issues. The second round of green-flag pit stops began on lap 87. Meira made his stop for four tires and fuel on lap 88, handing the lead to Scheckter, who pitted two laps later. After pit stops concluded on the 93rd lap, Meira reclaimed the first position. Castroneves managed to close the gap to Meira by lap 105, but was unable to pass him. Twenty-four laps later, Castroneves kicked off the third round of green-flag pit stops; Meira made his stop on lap 130, as did Wheldon on lap 133.

Castroneves took the lead once pit stops ended on the 134th lap, while Meira fell to second. Castroneves widened his gap over Meira to 4.3 seconds before making his final pit stop on lap 168. Meira made his stop four laps later, along with Carpenter, Patrick, and Andretti. After Wheldon and Scheckter stopped for tires and fuel on lap 177, Castroneves cycled back to the first position, and Kanaan overtook Scheckter for fourth place. Meira gradually condensed his gap behind Castroneves from four seconds to 1.5 seconds by the 187th lap. Despite Meira's rapid pace, Castroneves maintained the lead for the final 13 laps and secured his eleventh career IndyCar win and fourth of the season. It also marked Marlboro Team Penske's first win at Michigan since 1991.

Meira finished second for the seventh time in his career, ahead of Wheldon in third, Kanaan fourth, and Scheckter fifth. Sharp, Carpenter, Andretti, Matsuura, and Simmons rounded out the top ten, and Herta, Franchitti, Rice, Bucknum, Lazier, Dixon, and Roth were the last of the classified finishers. The race had two cautions and fifteen lead changes among seven different drivers. Meira led three times for a total of 75 laps, more than any other driver. The average speed was 193.972 mph (312.168 km/h), making this the fastest American open-wheel race at Michigan and the third-fastest race in IndyCar Series history.

=== Post-race ===
Castroneves performed his usual celebratory practice of climbing the front stretch catchfence before driving into victory lane; he earned $125,800 for his win. Castroneves was jubilant with his victory, saying: "I'm extremely happy. It was hard on everybody, not only myself but the entire team. Well, that's just to prove that you can't give up, you have to believe. The entire team believed." He admitted that he drove "like a maniac" in the final ten laps of the race upon seeing Meira in his rearview mirror. Second-place finisher Meira was pleased despite failing to win: "Panther Racing gave 102 percent today. We are doing it week in and week out at any track with any aero configuration. This is what makes champions, and winners and that's what we have here at Panther Racing. Everything is working." Third-place finisher Wheldon felt sympathetic for Hornish Jr. and admitted his performance paled in comparison to some of his competitors. He also thanked teammate Dixon for helping him at the end of the race.

Kanaan, who finished fourth, was reportedly seen in a heated discussion with Wheldon after the race. Though he felt his car was not capable of winning, he was angered that he did not finish third: "[Chip] Ganassi put Dixon between Dan and myself. They are going for a championship and we are going for race wins. We have two superspeedway races remaining and [Andretti Green Racing] has four cars for the payback." According to Wheldon, Kanaan never argued with him: "He came up to me and said, 'Good race.'" Patrick, who ran out of fuel with two laps remaining, was evidently infuriated with her retirement and stomped on pit road. She revealed that she had been dealing with telemetry issues throughout most of the race and stated: "This one is going to bug me for a while." Hornish Jr. said of his lap-73 retirement: "It's a shame to end a day like that, but that's how it goes sometimes."

The final result dropped Hornish Jr. to second in the Drivers' Championship with 368 points, eight less than Castroneves. Wheldon, with 359 points, moved to third over Dixon, who had 345 points. Meira, with 320 points, broke his tie with Kanaan for fifth. With three races remaining in the season, the 56-point margin separating Castroneves and Meira marked the closest points deficit between the top-five drivers since 2001.

=== Race classification ===
Pos	No.	Driver	Team	Laps	Time/Retired	Grid	Pts.
1	3	(Brazil) Hélio Castroneves	Marlboro Team Penske	200	02:03:43.7441	1	50
2	4	(Brazil) Vítor Meira	Panther Racing	200	+1.6229	6	43^{1}
3	10	(United Kingdom) Dan Wheldon	Target Chip Ganassi Racing	200	+6.2259	9	35
4	11	(Brazil) Tony Kanaan	Andretti Green Racing	200	+6.9874	3	32
5	2	(South Africa) Tomas Scheckter	Vision Racing	200	+27.9005	8	30
6	8	(United States) Scott Sharp	Delphi Fernández Racing	200	+28.5560	13	28
7	20	(United States) Ed Carpenter	Vision Racing	199	+1 lap	4	26
8	26	(United States) Marco Andretti	Andretti Green Racing	199	+1 lap	19	24
9	55	(Japan) Kosuke Matsuura	Super Aguri Fernández Racing	199	+1 lap	14	22
10	17	(United States) Jeff Simmons	Rahal Letterman Racing	199	+1 lap	16	20
11	7	(United States) Bryan Herta	Andretti Green Racing	199	+1 lap	12	19
12	27	(United Kingdom) Dario Franchitti	Andretti Green Racing	199	+1 lap	7	18
13	15	(United States) Buddy Rice	Rahal Letterman Racing	199	+1 lap	10	17
14	14	(United States) Jeff Bucknum	A. J. Foyt Racing	198	+2 laps	18	16
15	5	(United States) Buddy Lazier	Dreyer & Reinbold Racing	198	+2 laps	15	15
16	9	(New Zealand) Scott Dixon	Target Chip Ganassi Racing	198	+2 laps	5	14
17	16	(United States) Danica Patrick	Rahal Letterman Racing	197	Out of fuel	11	13
18	25	(Canada) Marty Roth	Roth Racing	192	+8 laps	17	12
19	6	(United States) Sam Hornish Jr.	Marlboro Team Penske	61	Engine	2	12

Notes

- ^1 — Includes three bonus points for leading the most laps.

== Championship standings after the race ==
Drivers' Championship standings
	Pos.	Driver	Points
2	1	(Brazil) Hélio Castroneves	376
1	2	(United States) Sam Hornish Jr.	368 (–8)
1	3	(United Kingdom) Dan Wheldon	359 (–17)
2	4	(New Zealand) Scott Dixon	345 (–31)
1	5	(Brazil) Vítor Meira	320 (–56)
Sources:

- Note: Only the top five positions are included.

Previous race: 2006 ABC Supply / A. J. Foyt Indy 225	IndyCar Series; 2006 season	Next race: 2006 Meijer Indy 300
Previous race: 2005 Michigan Indy 400	Firestone Indy 400	Next race: 2007 Firestone Indy 400
