= IndyCar Series at Nashville Superspeedway =

Borchetta Bourbon Music City Grand Prix

IndyCar Series
- Venue: Nashville Superspeedway
- First race: 2001
- Last race: 2026
- Distance: 399 miles (642 km)
- Laps: 300
- Previous names: Harrah's Indy 200 (2001); Firestone Indy 200 (2002–2008); Big Machine Music City Grand Prix (2024); Borchetta Bourbon Music City Grand Prix (2025–2026)
- Most wins (driver): Scott Dixon (3)
- Most wins (team): Chip Ganassi Racing (4)

The Nashville Superspeedway in Lebanon, Tennessee has hosted American open-wheel car racing events dating back to 2001.

== History ==
The 2001 event marked the first American open-wheel event in the Nashville area. During some years events were held on Saturday nights. The 2007 event was postponed until Sunday after a series of rain showers at the track.

Following the 2008 event, Indy Racing League officials decided to end their association with Nashville Superspeedway. The event was removed from the 2009 schedule, and afterwards the facility shuttered for several years. Subsequently renamed as the IndyCar Series, the series returned to the Nashville area in 2021 with the Music City Grand Prix on a downtown street circuit. Due to construction downtown, beginning in 2024 the race was moved to the Nashville Superspeedway. The race is currently the Borchetta Bourbon Music City Grand Prix. In 2026, the event was originally scheduled to become a 400-mile race, as well as move to late July, following the FIFA World Cup final, but due to excessive rainfall, the race was postponed to Monday, July 20. The race was also shortened from 300 laps back down to 225 due to extreme heat conditions.

As a Nashville-area racing tradition, from 2001 through 2008 the winner received a hand-made and painted Gibson Les Paul guitar. When the current event moved to the Superspeedway in 2024, the guitar tradition continued with agreement by Gibson, promoter Scott Borchetta, and circuit owner Marcus Smith.

== Race summaries ==
- 2024: For 2024 the Music City Grand Prix was moved to Nashville Superspeedway and scheduled as the season finale. The race would be a championship deciding showdown between Álex Palou and Will Power. Palou only needed to finish ninth or better to secure the championship, while Power had to win the race and hope Palou finished no better than tenth to win the championship. A glimmer of hope was given to Power during qualifying when he managed to qualify fourth while Palou had to take a nine position grid penalty for an unscheduled engine change, leaving him to start 24th on the grid. Kyle Kirkwood meanwhile qualified on pole, earning his first oval pole position. Power's championship hopes faded early in the race when he had to make an unusual early green flag pit stop on lap 13 for a seatbelt that had come undone in his car. Josef Newgarden took the lead before a yellow on lap 56 came out when Felix Rosenqvist blew a tire. Through two more caution periods the race turned to a head to head battle between Newgarden and Colton Herta, with Herta finally getting the best of Newgarden on lap 147. After clearing David Malukas and Scott Dixon, Herta battled with lapped traffic and eventually Pato O'Ward to retake the lead for good, taking his first victory on an oval. With Power multiple laps down, Palou secured his third IndyCar championship. Pato O'Ward finished second while Josef Newgarden rounded out the podium in third.

== Past winners ==
Season	Date	Driver	Team	Chassis	Engine	Race Distance		Race Time	Average Speed (mph)	Report	Refs
Season	Date	Driver	Team	Chassis	Engine	Laps	Miles (km)	Race Time	Average Speed (mph)	Report	Refs
2001	July 21	(United States) Buddy Lazier	Hemelgarn Racing	Dallara	Oldsmobile	200	266.6 (429.051)	1:44:44	144.809	Report	
2002	July 20	(United States) Alex Barron	Blair Racing	Dallara	Chevrolet	200	266.6 (429.051)	2:01:53	127.997	Report	
2003	July 19	(Brazil) Gil de Ferran	Team Penske	Dallara	Toyota	200	266.6 (429.051)	1:53:18	137.679	Report	
2004	July 17	(Brazil) Tony Kanaan	Andretti Green Racing	Dallara	Honda	200	266.6 (429.051)	1:55:35	134.975	Report	
2005	July 16	(United Kingdom) Dario Franchitti	Andretti Green Racing (2)	Dallara	Honda	200	266.6 (429.051)	1:57:13	133.089	Report	
2006	July 15	(New Zealand) Scott Dixon	Chip Ganassi Racing	Dallara	Honda	200	266.6 (429.051)	1:36:46	161.205	Report	
2007	July 15* (Note: The race was originally scheduled on Saturday, July 14, before being postponed to Sunday, July 15.)	(New Zealand) Scott Dixon (2)	Chip Ganassi Racing (2)	Dallara	Honda	200	266.6 (429.051)	1:35:06	164.03	Report	
2008	July 12	(New Zealand) Scott Dixon (3)	Chip Ganassi Racing (3)	Dallara	Honda	171* (Note: Race was shortened from 200 laps to 171 laps due to rain.)	227.943 (366.838)	1:30:05	148.072	Report	
2009 – 2023	Not held										
2024	September 15	(United States) Colton Herta	Andretti Global with Curb-Agajanian (3)	Dallara	Honda	206	273.98 (440.93)	1:43:15	159.207	Report	
2025	August 31	(United States) Josef Newgarden	Team Penske (2)	Dallara	Chevrolet	225	299.25 (481.49)	1:54:50	156.342	Report	
2026* (Note: The race was originally scheduled on Sunday, July 19, before being postponed to Monday, July 20. The race was also shortened from 300 laps to 225 due to extreme heat conditions.)	July 20*	(Spain) Álex Palou	Chip Ganassi Racing (4)	Dallara	Honda	225*	299.25 (481.49)	1:51:38	157.193	Report	

=== Support winners ===
==== Indy NXT ====
Season	Date	Winning driver	Ref
2002	July 20	(United States) Cory Witherill	
2003	July 18	(United Kingdom) Mark Taylor	
2004	July 17	(Brazil) Thiago Medeiros	
2005	July 16	(Brazil) Jaime Camara	
2006	July 15	(United Kingdom) Jay Howard	
2007	July 14	(United States) Robbie Pecorari	
2008	July 12	(Brazil) Ana Beatriz	
2009 – 2023	Not held		
2024	September 15	(United Kingdom) Louis Foster	
2025	August 31	(United States) Myles Rowe	
2026	July 19	(Italy) Matteo Nannini	

Preceded by Indy 200 at Mid-Ohio	IndyCar Series; Music City Grand Prix	Succeeded by Grand Prix of Portland
