= Vítor Meira =

Brazilian racing driver (born 1977)

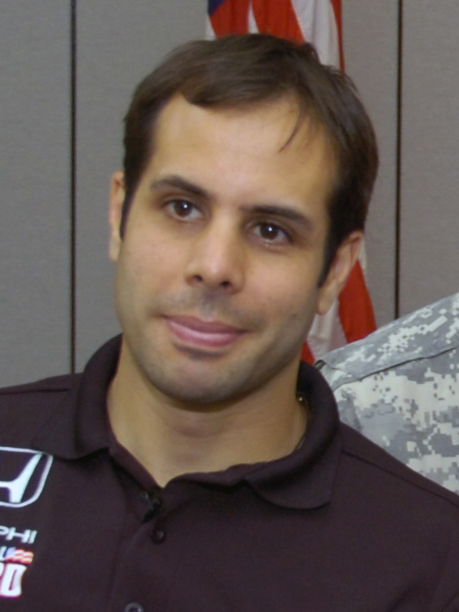
- Meira in 2008
- Nationality: (Brazil) Brazilian
- Born: March 27, 1977 (age 49) Brasília, Federal District, Brazil

IRL IndyCar Series career
- Debut season: 2002
- Current team: A. J. Foyt Enterprises
- Years active: 10
- Car number: 2, 4, 14, 17, 22
- Former teams: Panther Racing; Rahal Letterman Racing; Team Menard
- Starts: 112
- Wins: 0
- Podiums: 15
- Poles: 2
- Best finish: 5th in 2006

Championship titles
- 2000: Formula Three Sudamericana

Awards
- 2008: Scott Brayton Trophy

Vítor Meira (born March 27, 1977) is a Brazilian former auto racing driver. He formerly competed in the IndyCar Series and has twice finished second in the Indianapolis 500.

== IndyCar Series ==
=== 2002 ===
After participating in an open test for Panther Racing at Texas Motor Speedway in 2002, Meira made his IndyCar debut with Team Menard on August 11, 2002, at Kentucky Speedway. A little over a month later, Meira won his first career pole at Texas Motor Speedway after just four starts, and finished in third place.

=== 2003 ===
In 2003, Meira ran his first start of the year for Team Menard at the Indianapolis 500, where he finished twelfth as a rookie. Meira then ran the next seven races in the No. 2 Johns Manville powered Dallara Chevrolet, until a practice crash at Kentucky Speedway sidelined him for the next three races. After recovering from his wrist injury he suffered at Kentucky, Meira ran the final two races of the season.

=== 2004 ===
In 2004, Meira missed the first two races of the season before a race-by-race deal was presented to Meira by Rahal-Letterman Racing. After Meira's disappointing finish of seventeenth in Indy Japan 300, where he suffered a clutch problem, he ran the rest of the season in the No. 17 G-Force sponsored by Centrix Financial. At The Milwaukee Mile, on July 25, 2004, Meira earned his second career pole.

=== 2005 ===
Rahal-Letterman Racing signed Meira to a three-year contract in 2005, with backing from longtime supporter, Johns Manville and Menards. One notable race finish during the year was a second place to Dan Wheldon at the Indianapolis 500. Meira gave Rahal-Letterman Racing their best final point standing finish of seventh as well as recording seven top-five and eleven top-ten finishes for the team. After losing a majority of the funds for the No. 17 car, Rahal-Letterman needed a driver who had sponsorship with them. For Meira, that meant losing his ride to Paul Dana, who brought Ethanol sponsorship.

=== 2006 ===
Going into 2006, Meira was looking to moving back to Brazil and run stock cars for fellow Brazilian and IndyCar competitor, Hélio Castroneves' team. But just as he was getting ready to pack his bags for Brasília, he received a phone call from Panther Racing owner, John Barnes. Even though Panther had lost their longtime sponsor, Pennzoil, as well as engine supplier, Chevrolet, the owners (John Barnes, Mike Griffin, Jim Harbaugh, and Doug Boles), sold off old cars, parts, and equipment to keep the team running. After much speculation of the team closing its doors in Indianapolis, the news came on February 10, 2006, that Panther Racing and Meira signed a deal to run the famous No. 4 for the 2006 IndyCar season. Throughout 2006, Panther Racing and Meira had a plethora of sponsors on the side of their Honda powered Dallara, including Econova, Network Live, Harrah's, Lincoln Tech, and Revive Energy Mints all adorned the sidepods of the brightly colored orange car during the 2006 season. Despite not winning a race in 2006, Meira finished a career best of fifth in the IndyCar point standings after finishing the season with seven top five and twelve top ten finishes. Even though he has not won a race in over fifty starts, he has finished second seven times in his career.

=== 2007 ===
After signing a three-year contract with Panther Racing in 2008, Meira was sponsored by longtime IndyCar participant, Delphi Corporation, who signed a two-year deal with the team.

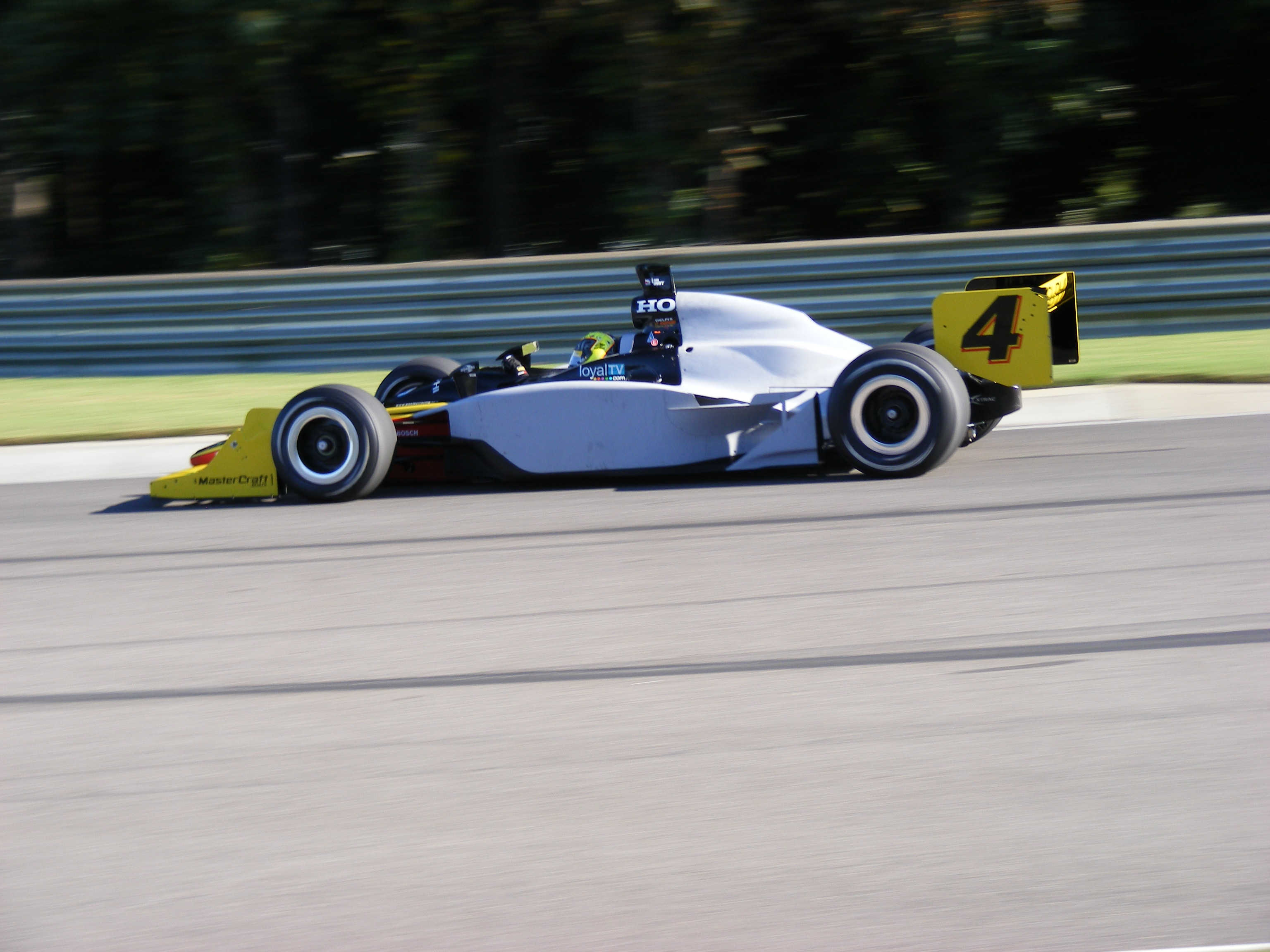
Meira testing at Barber Motorsports Park during the 2007-2008 off-season

=== 2008 ===
Meira returned to Panther Racing in 2008 where the United States National Guard became the car's primary sponsor and Delphi became a secondary one. However, the team again contracted to a single car in the IndyCar Series as the Aguri and their sponsorship took Hideki Mutoh to the IndyCar Series with Andretti Green Racing rather than Panther.

Meira finished second in the 2008 running of the Indianapolis 500 matching his second-place finish in 2005. Meira chased the eventual winner, Scott Dixon, closing the gap to as little as 0.4 seconds until losing ground due to late race traffic. Meira set his fastest lap on lap 195 of 200.

=== 2009 ===
Meira drove the No. 14 for A. J. Foyt Enterprises in 2009, replacing Darren Manning. During the 2009 Indianapolis 500, Meira's car survived a spectacular fire in the pits and he later broke two vertebrae in his lower back during a crash involving Raphael Matos on lap 174. Meira did not need surgery and the fracture was treated with a back brace. Meira was out for the rest of the 2009 season.

=== 2010 ===
Meira drove to a podium finish in his first race back after his injury; a third place finish in his home country of Brazil. This would be his best finish of the year. Meira drove to a twelfth place overall finish in the points standings for the 2010 IndyCar Series season.

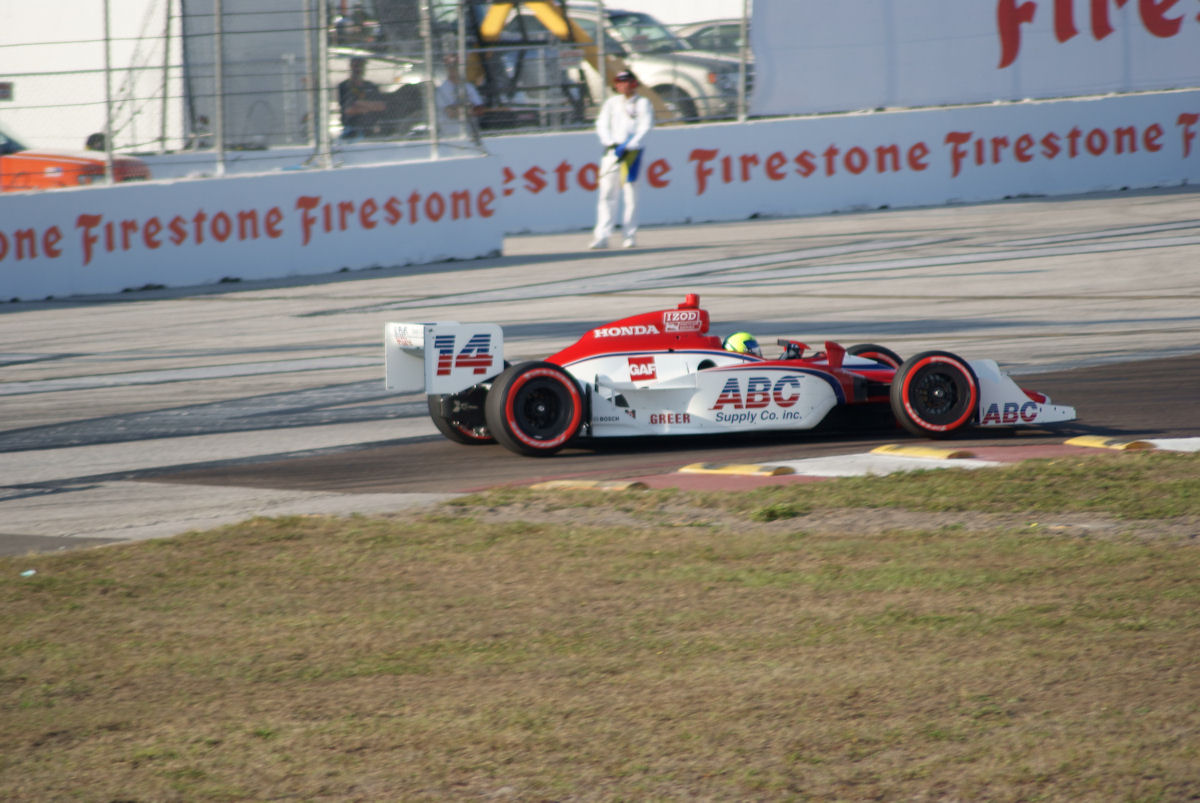
Meira during practice for the 2011 Honda Grand Prix of St. Petersburg

=== 2011 ===
Meira returned to A. J. Foyt Enterprises driving the No. 14 ABC Supply Company IndyCar. He finished fifteenth overall, with a best of fifth place of Toronto. He was involved in the fifteen-car accident that killed Dan Wheldon during the 2011 IZOD IndyCar World Championship race. Meira was left without a ride for the 2012 IndyCar season, and he left American racing as a result.

=== 2015 ===
Meira attempted a come back for the 2015 Indianapolis 500, but failed to find a ride.

== Personal life ==
Meira, who became engaged to longtime girlfriend, Adriana, in March 2006, was married at the Little White Wedding Chapel in Las Vegas on March 22, 2008.

== Business ==
After his American racing career, Meira started a self-storage facility business in Brazil, and took over an advertising agency started by his father.

== Motorsports career results ==
=== Complete Euro Formula 3000 results ===
(key)

Year	Entrant	1	2	3	4	5	6	7	8	9	DC	Points
2001	ADM Motorsport	VLL; Ret	PER; Ret	MOZ; DNS	DON; Ret	ZOL; 2	IMO; 5	NÜR; 3	VAL; 3		5th	16
2002	ADM Motorsport	VLL; 7	PER; 11	MOZ; Ret	SPA	DON	BRN	DIJ	JER	CAG	NC	0

=== Complete IndyCar Series results ===
(key)

Year	Team	No.	Chassis	Engine	1	2	3	4	5	6	7	8	9	10	11	12	13	14	15	16	17	18	19	Rank	Points	Ref
2002	Team Menard	2	Dallara	Chevrolet	HMS	PHX	FON	NZR	INDY	TXS	PPIR	RIR	KAN	NSH	MIS	KTY; 15	STL; 9	CHI; 8	TX2; 3					25th	96	
2003	Team Menard	22	Dallara	Chevrolet	HMS	PHX	MOT	INDY; 12																22nd	170	
2003	Team Menard	2	Dallara	Chevrolet					TXS; 12	PPIR; 16	RIR; 22	KAN; 20	NSH; 19	MIS; 21	STL; 9	KTY; DNS	NZR	CHI	FON; 11	TX2; 4				22nd	170	
2004	Rahal Letterman Racing	17	G-Force	Honda	HMS	PHX	MOT; 17	INDY; 6	TXS; 6	RIR; 2	KAN; 2	NSH; 12	MIL; 5	MIS; 5	KTY; 7	PPIR; 7	NZR; 10	CHI; 5	FON; 21	TX2; 4				8th	376	
2005	Rahal Letterman Racing	17	Panoz	Honda	HMS; 4	PHX; 11	STP; 5	MOT; 15	INDY; 2	TXS; 9	RIR; 20	KAN; 3	NSH; 16	MIL; 9	MIS; 14	KTY; 2	PPIR; 5	SNM; 9	CHI; 7	WGL; 18	FON; 3			7th	422	
2006	Panther Racing	4	Dallara	Honda	HMS; 16	STP; 5	MOT; 10	INDY; 10	WGL; 2	TXS; 6	RIR; 2	KAN; 3	NSH; 3	MIL; 15	MIS; 2	KTY; 6	SNM; 3	CHI; 6						5th	411	
2007	Panther Racing	4	Dallara	Honda	HMS; 4	STP; 16	MOT; 17	KAN; 8	INDY; 10	MIL; 5	TXS; 5	IOW; 9	RIR; 9	WGL; 17	NSH; 10	MDO; 17	MIS; 18	KTY; 10	SNM; 9	DET; 15	CHI; 18			12th	334	
2008	Panther Racing	4	Dallara	Honda	HMS; 10	STP; 19	MOT^{1} 16	LBH^{1} DNP	KAN; 22	INDY; 2	MIL; 22	TXS; 7	IOW; 15	RIR; 20	WGL; 22	NSH; 6	MDO; 6	EDM; 19	KTY; 4	SNM; 7	DET; 17	CHI; 27		13th	324	
2008	A.J. Foyt Enterprises	14	Dallara	Honda																			SRF^{2} 14	13th	324	
2009	A.J. Foyt Enterprises	14	Dallara	Honda	STP; 9	LBH; 14	KAN; 22	INDY; 21	MIL	TXS	IOW	RIR	WGL	TOR	EDM	KTY	MDO	SNM	CHI	MOT	HMS			28th	62	
2010	A.J. Foyt Enterprises	14	Dallara	Honda	SAO; 3	STP; 15	ALA; 18	LBH; 11	KAN; 10	INDY; 27	TXS; 10	IOW; 7	WGL; 19	TOR; 11	EDM; 16	MDO; 15	SNM; 15	CHI; 9	KTY; 23	MOT; 17	HMS; 6			12th	310	
2011	A.J. Foyt Enterprises	14	Dallara	Honda	STP; 8	ALA; 12	LBH; 9	SAO; 17	INDY; 15	TXS1; 8	TXS2; 11	MIL; 24	IOW; 18	TOR; 5	EDM; 12	MDO; 10	NHM; 10	SNM; 22	BAL; 9	MOT; 25	KTY; 16	LVS; C		16th	287	

^{1} Run on same day.
^{2} Non-points-paying, exhibition race.

Years	Teams	Races	Poles	Wins	Podiums (Non-win)	Top 10s (Non-podium)	Indianapolis 500 Wins	Championships
10	4	131	2	0	15	56	0	0

==== Indianapolis 500 ====
Year	Chassis	Engine	Start	Finish	Team
2003	Dallara	Chevrolet	26	12	Menard
2004	G-Force	Honda	7	6	Rahal Letterman
2005	Panoz	Honda	7	2	Rahal Letterman
2006	Dallara	Honda	6	10	Panther
2007	Dallara	Honda	19	10	Panther
2008	Dallara	Honda	8	2	Panther
2009	Dallara	Honda	14	21	Foyt
2010	Dallara	Honda	30	27	Foyt
2011	Dallara	Honda	11	15	Foyt

=== Complete Stock Car Brasil results ===
Year	Team	Car	1	2	3	4	5	6	7	8	9	10	11	12	13	14	15	16	17	18	19	20	21	Rank	Points
2012	Officer ProGP	Chevrolet Sonic	INT; 27	CTB; 8	VEL; Ret	RBP; Ret	LON; 24	RIO; 18	SAL; Ret	CGD; 9	TAR; 20	CTB; 9	BSB; 17	INT; 28										23rd	45
2014	Boettger Competições	Peugeot 408	INT; 1 Ret	SCZ; 1	SCZ; 2	BRA; 1	BRA; 2	GOI; 1	GOI; 2	GOI; 1	CAS; 1	CAS; 2	CUR; 1	CUR; 2	VEL; 1	VEL; 2	SAL; 1	SAL; 2	TAR; 1	TAR; 2	RBP; 1	RBP; 2	CUR; 1	NC†	0†
2015	Eurofarma RC	Chevrolet Sonic	GOI; 1; 6	RBP; 1	RBP; 2	VEL; 1	VEL; 2	CUR; 1	CUR; 2	SCZ; 1	SCZ; 2	CUR; 1	CUR; 2	GOI; 1	CAS; 1	CAS; 2	BRA; 1	BRA; 2	CUR; 1	CUR; 2	TAR; 1	TAR; 2	INT; 1	NC†	0†

† Ineligible for championship points.

Sporting positions
Preceded by Hoover Orsi	Formula Three Sudamericana Champion; 2000	Succeeded by Juliano Moro
Awards
Preceded by Tony Kanaan	Scott Brayton Award; 2008	Succeeded by Sarah Fisher
