= Panther Racing =

American open wheel auto racing team

(United States) Panther Racing
- Founded: April 1997
- Folded: September 2014
- Base: Indianapolis, Indiana, U.S.
- Team principal(s): John Barnes; Jim Harbaugh; Mike Griffin; Courtney Jones; Joe Cain
- Former series: IndyCar Series
- Drivers' Championships: Indy Racing League: 2001: Sam Hornish Jr. 2002: Hornish Jr. Infinity Pro Series: 2003: Mark Taylor

Panther Racing was an American open wheel auto racing team. It was one of the oldest continually operating teams in the IndyCar Series.

Four years in a row (2008–2011), the team finished second at the Indianapolis 500.

== Formation ==
The team was formed in late 1997, to compete in the Pep Boys Indy Racing League (now IndyCar Series), by six owners: open-wheel racing team manager John Barnes, Indianapolis car dealer Gary Pedigo, former radio personality Mike Griffin, television production executive Terry Lingner, Indianapolis Colts quarterback Jim Harbaugh and Indianapolis director of corporate government affairs Doug Boles. Mike Kitchel was the Director of Public Relations for Panther Racing.

== IndyCar Series ==
=== 1998–2000: Early success with Scott Goodyear ===
For their first season in 1998, the team fielded the #4 Pennzoil G-Force GF01B-Oldsmobile Aurora L47 V8 for Scott Goodyear. The car had an unusual yellow and black paint scheme, as Pennzoil did not use its traditional all-yellow livery in favor of a Sam Bass design as part of changes by the company when they added NASCAR sponsorship to Dale Earnhardt, Inc. in 1998 (Bass, a well-known race car motorsport livery designer, wanted more focus on black instead of the traditional yellow to reflect Pennzoil's sponsorship of Earnhardt and Earnhardt's signature black color). The car used #4, which reflected Harbaugh's jersey number with the Indianapolis Colts. The team would debut at the Indy 200 at Walt Disney World Speedway. Goodyear would start in 21st place (due to qualifying being rained and the top 20 starters being determined by 1996-1997 entrant standings and the remaining eight by practice speeds). Goodyear would finish in 17th place due to a suspension failure after 132 laps. Goodyear would then finish in 6th place (one lap down) at the following race, the Dura Lube 200 at Phoenix International Raceway. Over the next seven races, Goodyear would finish in the top 6 five times and would get a best finish of 2nd place at the New England 200 at New Hampshire International Speedway. Goodyear was ranked in 5th place following the Atlanta 500 Classic at Atlanta Motor Speedway and would finish in 7th place with 244 points due to 22nd-place finishes at the last two races of the season, the Lone Star 500 at Texas Motor Speedway and the Las Vegas 500K at Las Vegas Motor Speedway. The team would also field the #43 Pennzoil G-Force GF01B-Oldsmobile Aurora L47 V8 for Dave Steele at Texas and Las Vegas. Steele would finish in 24th place at Texas and 27th place at Las Vegas. Steele would finish in 36th place in points with 22 points (Steele also drove for Helmut Marko Racing at Phoenix).

In 1999, Goodyear continued to drive for the team in the #4 Pennzoil G-Force GF01C-Oldsmobile Aurora L47 V8. At the season-opening TransWorld Diversified Services Indy 200 at Walt Disney World Speedway, Goodyear started in 4th place and finished in 2nd place after leading 36 laps. Goodyear would then win the MCI WorldCom 200 at Phoenix International Raceway after starting in 3rd place and leading for a race-high 134 laps. Goodyear would take the points lead following the race. Goodyear would then finish in a disappointing 27th place at the Indianapolis 500 due to an engine failure after 101 laps before winning the following race, the Longhorn 500 at Texas Motor Speedway, after leading the final 43 laps of the race. Following Texas, Goodyear would get a best finish of 12th place at the Radisson 200 at Pikes Peak International Raceway in the remaining six races of the season. Goodyear continued to hold the points lead following the MBNA Mid-Atlantic 200 at Dover Downs International Speedway (with three races left in the season). Goodyear would finish in 9th place in the final standings with 217 points. Steele would drive the #43 Pennzoil G-Force GF01C-Oldsmobile Aurora L47 V8 as a second car for the team at Indianapolis. Steele would crash in practice on May 19 and would suffer a concussion, causing him and the car to fail to qualify.

For 2000, Goodyear drove the #4 Pennzoil Dallara IR00-Oldsmobile Aurora L47 V8. The team began to use an all-yellow Pennzoil livery after using the Sam Bass-designed black and yellow livery the previous two seasons. At the season-opening Delphi Indy 200 at Walt Disney World Speedway, Goodyear started in 8th place and finished in 4th place. Goodyear would then finish in 2nd place at the MCI WorldCom Indy 200 at Phoenix International Raceway and was ranked in 3rd place in points. Following Phoenix, Goodyear only had one finish outside of the top 12 (a 16th-place finish at the Radisson 200 at Pikes Peak International Raceway) and was always ranked inside the top 4 in points. Goodyear would later win the pole position at the Belterra Resort Indy 300 at Kentucky Speedway and finish in 2nd place to Buddy Lazier after leading a race-high 65 laps. Following the race, Goodyear was ranked in 2nd place in points and was 38 points behind Lazier (a win gives 50 points, while leading the most laps gave 2 points and qualifying on the pole position gave 1 point). At the season-ending Excite 500 at Texas Motor Speedway, Goodyear started in 2nd place and won the race after leading for 39 laps. Eddie Cheever (who was also eligible to win the championship due to being 4 point behind Lazier) would finish in 2nd place and Lazier would finish in 4th place. Goodyear would finish in 2nd place in the championship to Lazier by 18 points.

=== 2001–2003: Championships with Hornish Jr. ===
Goodyear went into semi-retirement starting in 2001 and second-year driver Sam Hornish Jr. became the new driver of the #4 Pennzoil Dallara IR01-Oldsmobile Aurora L47 V8. Hornish would win the season-opening Pennzoil Copper World Indy 200 at Phoenix International Raceway after starting in 2nd place and leading 140 of 200 laps. Hornish would then win the Infiniti Grand Prix of Miami at Homestead-Miami Speedway after leading 142 of 200 laps. Hornish would only have one finish outside of the top 10 during the season (a 14th-place finish at the Indianapolis 500) and his worst finish in the top 10 was a 6th-place finish at the Harrah's 200 at Nashville Superspeedway. Hornish would also receive his first two pole positions of his career during the season at the Gateway Indy 250 at Gateway International Raceway and the season-ending Chevy 500 at Texas Motor Speedway (although both races had their starting lineup determined by entrant standings). Hornish would clinch the championship at the next-to-last race of the season, the Delphi Indy 200 at Chicagoland Speedway, with a 2nd-place finish. Hornish would then win the season-ending race at Texas after leading 115 laps. Hornish would win the championship with 503 points, beating Lazier by 105 points.

For 2002, Hornish returned to drive the #4 Pennzoil Dallara IR02-Chevrolet V8. At the season-opening Grand Prix of Miami at Homestead-Miami Speedway, Hornish qualified on the pole position and led for 166 of 200 laps to win the race. Hornish would then win the Yahmaha Indy 400 at California Speedway after leading for 73 laps and passing Jaques Lazier for the lead on the final lap on the main straightaway. During the season, Hornish would battle for the points lead with Marlboro Team Penske teammates Hélio Castroneves and Gil de Ferran. Hornish then had three races where he failed to finish better than 17th place (Firestone Indy 225 at Nazareth Speedway) and would drop to 3rd place in points behind the Penske drivers following the Indianapolis 500 (where Hornish finished in 25th place, ten laps down, due to contact with the wall). Hornish would then win the SunTrust Indy Challenge at Richmond International Raceway after leading only the final 2 laps of the race. Hornish would reclaim the points lead following the Belterra Casino Indy 300 at Kentucky Speedway with a 2nd-place finish. After the following race, the Gateway Indy 250 at Gateway International Raceway, Hornish was 8 points behind new leader Castroneves and 1 point behind de Ferran. Hornish would then win the Delphi Indy 300 at Chicagoland Speedway by 0.0024 over Al Unser Jr. after qualifying on the pole position and leading for 102 of 200 laps. Following the race, Hornish led Castroneves by 12 points and de Ferran by 38 points. De Ferran was injured in the race and would miss the season-ending Chevy 500 at Texas Motor Speedway. At Texas, Hornish started in 3rd place and led for 79 laps and would beat Castroneves for the victory. Hornish would win the championship with 531 points. The team would also field the #15 Pennzoil Dallara IR02-Chevrolet V8 at Chicagoland and Texas for Dan Wheldon (who would make his series debut in the car). At Chicagoland, Wheldon started in 7th place and finished in 10th place. At Texas, Wheldon started in 28th (last) place and would finish in 15th place, five laps down. Wheldon would finish in 36th place in points with 35 points.

In 2003, Hornish would continue to drive the #4 Pennzoil Dallara IR03-Chevrolet V8. Several teams from the struggling Champ Car World Series would join the IndyCar Series full-time and would use Honda and Toyota engines. Panther's Chevrolet engines would struggle compared to the Honda and Toyota engines during the season. At the season-opening Toyota Indy 300 at Homestead-Miami Speedway, Hornish started in 3rd place and finish in 10th place, one lap down. Hornish would then get a 6th-place finish at the Indy Japan 300 at Twin Ring Motegi. At the Indianapolis 500, they would field the #44 and #98 Pedigo Chevrolet Dallara IR03-Chevrolet V8 for Robby McGehee and Billy Boat. Hornish would qualify in 18th place while Boat and McGehee qualified in 29th and 31st place. Boat would retire after 7 laps due an engine failure and would finish in 32nd place. McGehee would suffer a steering failure after 125 laps and would finish in 25th place. Hornish was running in the top 10 when he blew an engine after 195 of 200 laps and would finish in 15th place. Hornish would get three top 10 finishes at the next three races, with a best finish of 4th place at the SunTrust Indy Challenge at Richmond International Raceway. Cosworth would then build a new Chevrolet engine that was dubbed "Chevworth". Hornish's results would significantly improve and he would have a streak of six races where he finished no worse than 6th place (his next worst finish was 2nd place) and would get three wins at the Belterra Casino Indy 300 at Kentucky Speedway (after leading 181 of 200 laps and qualifying on the pole position), the Delphi Indy 300 at Chicagoland Speedway and the Toyota Indy 400 at California Speedway. Going into the season-ending Chevy 500 at Texas Motor Speedway Hornish was 19 points behind leaders Scott Dixon and Hélio Castroneves (who were tied) and had a chance to win a third consecutive championship, along with Tony Kanaan and Gil de Ferran. At Texas, Hornish retired after 176 of 195 laps due to a spray issue and would finish in 17th place and in 5th place in the championship with 461 points, 46 points behind champion Dixon. McGehee finished in 35th place in points with 5 points and Boat finished in 37th place with 1 point.

=== 2004–2005: IRL's Chevrolet spearhead and decline ===
For 2004, Tomas Scheckter replaced Hornish, who left to drive for Team Penske, in the #4 Pennzoil Dallara IR03-Chevrolet V8. Team Menard merged into the team to form Menard-Panther Racing and would field Menard's #2 Johns Manville/Menards Dallara IR03-Chevrolet V8 for 2003 Menards Infiniti Pro Series champion Mark Taylor under the name. At the season-opening Toyota Indy 300 at Homestead-Miami Speedway, Scheckter started in 3rd place and Taylor 6th. Scheckter would lead for 22 laps and would finish 5th, while Taylor crashed after 39 laps and finished in 19th (last) place. Scheckter would get eight top 10 starts in the first nine races, but would fail to qualify in the top 10 afterwards nor would he get a top 10 finish for the remainder of the season. Scheckter's second-best finish of the season was a pair of 13th-place finishes at the Indy Japan 300 at Twin Ring Motegi and the Firestone Indy 225 at Nazareth Speedway. At the Indianapolis 500, Scheckter qualified in 10th place and finished in 18th place, one lap down. In the race, Scheckter passed six cars at once. Although Taylor had three top 10 starts, with a best of 3rd at the SunTrust Indy Challenge at Richmond International Raceway, he crashed out of five of the first six races. The only race Taylor finished was the Copper World Indy 200 at Phoenix International Raceway, where he finished 12th, two laps down. Taylor would be replaced by Townsend Bell following Richmond. Bell would start in 7th place in his debut for the team, the Argent Mortgage 200 at Kansas Speedway, and would finish in 17th place, 11 laps down. Bell then finished 5th at the Firestone Indy 200 at Nashville Superspeedway. Bell would get five top 10 finishes in 10 starts and would finish 21st in points with 193 points, despite missing the first six races of the season. Scheckter finished 19th in points with 230. Taylor, who drove for Access Motorsports after being released from Panther finished 17th in points, despite missing one race during his transition. Following the season, Menards left the team to sponsor Vítor Meira at Rahal Letterman Racing and the #2 car began to compete under Panther Racing proper.

In 2005, Scheckter returned to drive the #4Pennzoil Dallara IR05-Chevrolet V8. Tomáš Enge became the driver of the #2 Rockstar Energy Drink Dallara IR05-Chevrolet V8. At the season-opening Toyota Indy 300 at Homestead-Miami Speedway, Scheckter qualified on the pole position and Enge in 3rd. In the race, Enge suffered an engine failure after 41 laps and finished 21st out of 22 cars while Scheckter led for 13 laps but was involved in a crash on lap 159 and finished in 11th place. Scheckter and Enge would qualify in the top in each of the next three races, but Scheckter would only get a best finish of 10th place at the Indy Japan 300 at Twin Ring Motegi, where Enge failed to start. Both drivers were involved in crashes at the XM Satellite Radio Indy 200 at Phoenix International Raceway and the Honda Grand Prix of St. Petersburg on the Streets of St. Petersburg. At the Indianapolis 500, Buddy Lazier would drive the #95 Jiffy Lube/Jonathan Byrd's Cafeteria/ESPN 950 AM Dallara IR05-Chevrolet V8 in conjunction with Byrd Racing. Lazier would qualify in 9th place, Enge in 10th and Scheckter in 11th. On lap 155, Enge and Scheckter were involved in the same crash and would finish in 19th and 20th place. Lazier would finish in 5th place with a broken front wing due to contact with Scott Sharp. At the following race, the Bombardier Learjet 500 at Texas Motor Speedway, Scheckter qualified on the pole position and Enge in 2nd. Scheckter would lead for 119 of 200 laps and would win Panther's final race while Enge finished 19th, six laps down. Scheckter would get five top 5 finishes for the rest of the season. Enge would be injured at the Firestone Indy 200 at Nashville Superspeedway and would miss two races. When Enge returned for the final six races, he got three top 10 finishes with a best finish of 5th place at Argent Mortgage Indy Grand Prix at Infineon Raceway. Lazier would return for five races (including the ABC Supply Company A.J. Foyt 225 at the Milwaukee Mile, where he replaced Enge) with sponsorship from Pennzoil and American Sentry Guard. Lazier would have top 10 starts in each race and would get four top 10 finishes in four of them, with a best finish of 6th place at the Firestone Indy 400 at Michigan International Speedway and the AMBER Alert Portal Indy 300 at Kentucky Speedway. Bell would replace Enge at Michigan and would have the fastest lap of the race after starting 10th and finished 15th after being involved in a crash after 180 laps. Scheckter finished 9th in points with 390 points, Enge in 16th with 261 points (2nd in the rookie of the year standings to Danica Patrick), Lazier finished 23rd with 140 points and Bell 30th with 15 points.

=== 2006–2007: Transition to Honda ===
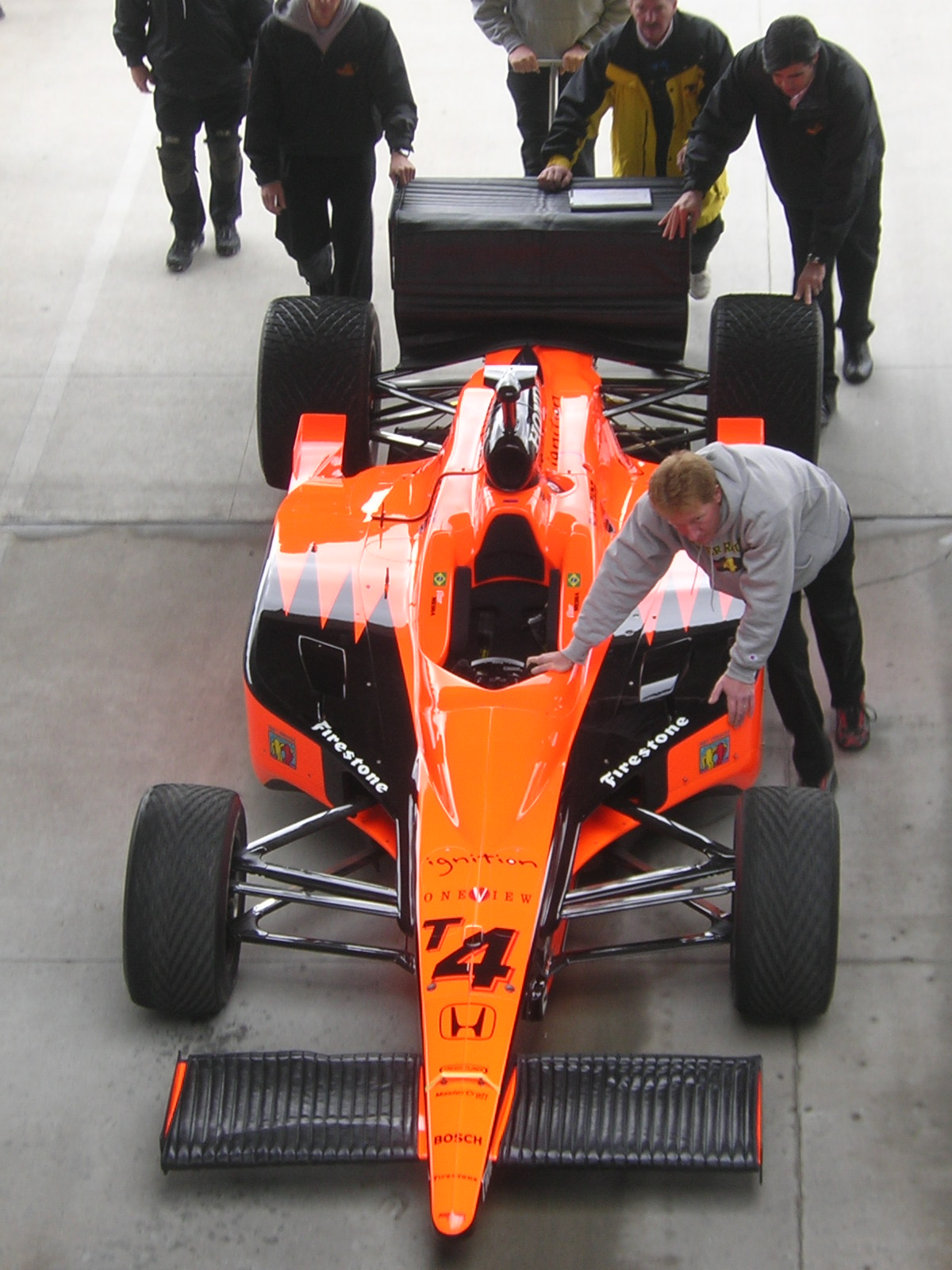
Panther's 2006 car driven by Vítor Meira

In August 2005, General Motors announced that they were withdrawing from the IndyCar Series (by this point Panther was their only full-time team). Royal Dutch Shell also left the team following the 2005 season. The team would cut down to only one car, the #4 Dallara IR05-Ilmor-Honda Indy V8 HI7R for Vítor Meira in 2006. The team would start off the season with sponsorship from Econova at the Toyota Indy 300 at Homestead-Miami Speedway and the Honda Grand Prix of St. Petersburg on the Streets of St. Petersburg. At Homestead, Meira started in 15th place and finished in 16th place out of 20 cars (four of which failed to start the race) due to an engine failure after 10 laps. At St. Petersburg, Meira started in 12th place and finished in 5th place after leading for two laps. The team then got sponsorship from Network Live for the Indy Japan 300 at Twin Ring Motegi, where Meira finished 10th. At the Indianapolis 500, Meira qualified in 6th place and would be the highest-starting driver to not drive for Team Penske, Chip Ganassi Racing or Andretti Green Racing. The team would acquire sponsorship from Harrah's after qualifying. Meira would eventually finish in 10th place. The team then ran the next four races without sponsorship. Meira would finish in 2nd at the Watkins Glen Indy Grand Prix presented by Tissot at Watkins Glen International, 6th at the Bombardier Learjet 500 at Texas Motor Speedway, 2nd at the SunTrust Indy Challenge at Richmond International Raceway and 3rd at the Kansas Lottery Indy 300 at Kansas Speedway. Following this group of races, the team got sponsorship from Revive! for three races. Meira would get a 3rd-place finish at the Firestone Indy 200 at Nashville Superspeedway and his third 2nd-place finish of the season at the Firestone Indy 400 at Michigan International Speedway after leading for a race-high 75 laps. Lincoln Tech, Barnes' alma mater would sponsor the car for the final three races of the season. Meira would finish 6th at both the Meijer Indy 300 presented by Coca-Cola and Secret at Kentucky Speedway and the season-ending Peak Antifreeze Indy 300 presented by Mr. Clean at Chicagoland Speedway and 3rd at the Indy Grand Prix of Sonoma at Infineon Raceway. Meira would finish in 5th place in the final standings with 411 points and would be the highest-ranked driver not driving for Penske or Ganassi.

For 2007, Kosuke Matsuura joined Panther as a second car, running Panasonic sponsorship and in association with the Autobacs Racing Team Aguri, with the #55. Meira's #4 carried Delphi sponsorship. Both drivers had so-so years, with Matsuura taking a top five at Michigan.

=== 2008–2013: National Guard sponsorship and four 2nd places at Indy ===
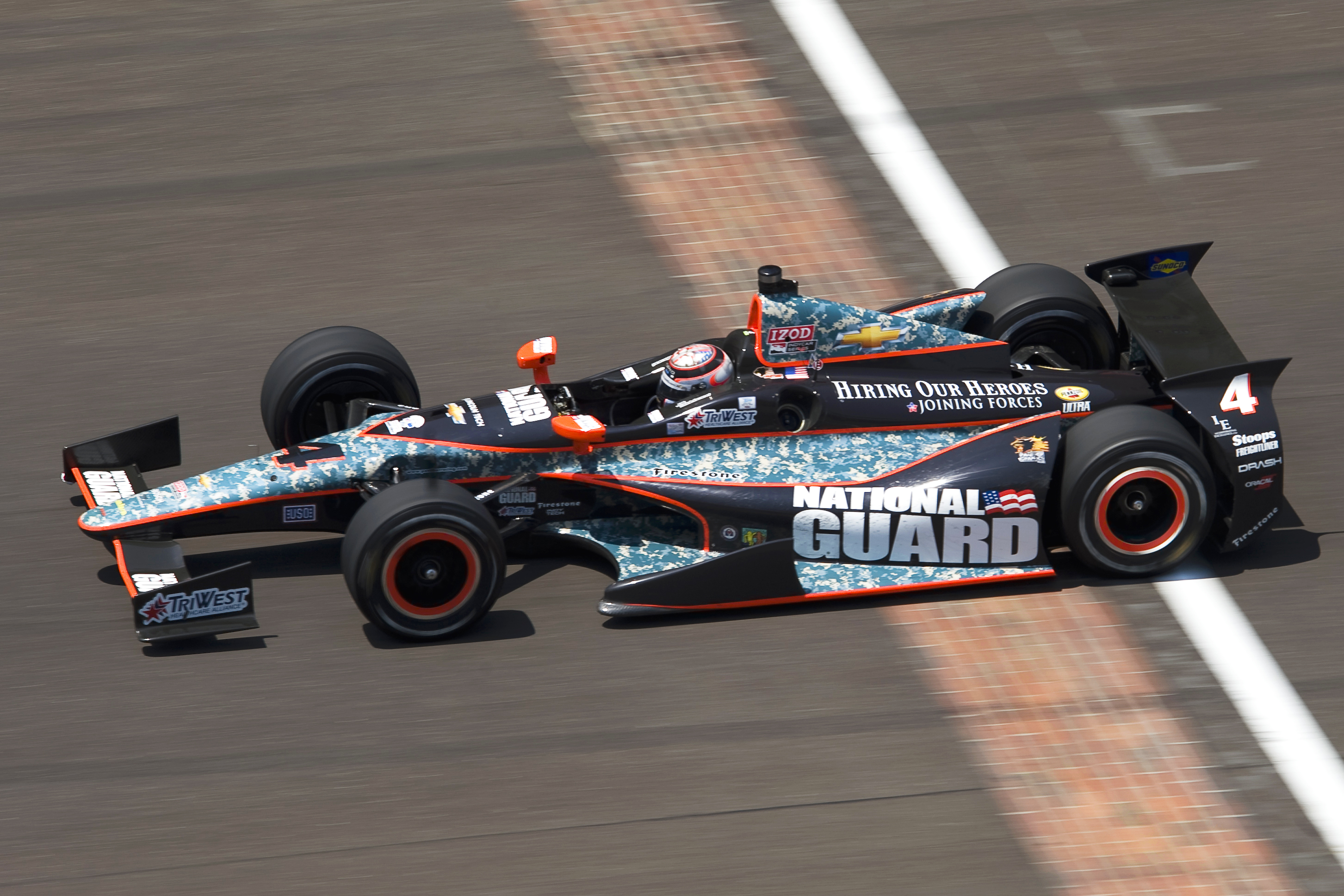
Panther's 2012 car driven by J. R. Hildebrand

For 2008, Matsuura was released from the 55 and Panasonic sponsorship went to the #27 of rookie Hideki Mutoh for Andretti Green Racing. Meira's team remained unchanged. Meira scored a second-place finish for Panther Racing at the 2008 Indianapolis 500, earning more than a million dollars.

In 2009 former IndyCar Series champ and Indianapolis 500 winner Dan Wheldon replaced Meira in the Panther #4 car, with the U.S. National Guard as the primary sponsor. Veteran driver Scott Sharp competed in the #16 Patron car for the team at the Indy 500. Wheldon finished second, with Sharp off the pace.

In 2010, Wheldon remained with the team and again placed second in the Indianapolis 500, however the team was not a factor for most of the season. The squad also ran a limited schedule with Ed Carpenter, scoring a second-place finish at Kentucky. Wheldon departed the team after the season, while Carpenter signed on with Sarah Fisher Racing.

In 2009, Firestone Indy Lights champion J. R. Hildebrand signed a multi-year contract to drive the #4 National Guard car starting in 2011. In the 2011 Indy 500 the team's rookie driver was leading when he crashed on the final turn of the final lap. Hildebrand coasted across the finish line to place second. Ironically former Panther Racing driver Dan Wheldon, driving the #98 William Rast car for Bryan Herta Autosport, won the race after finishing second the last two years.

Hildebrand remained with the team. He was 11th in the final points standings. Panther Racing and Dreyer & Reinbold Racing formed a strategic alliance prior to the 2012 Indy 500. The team obtained Panther's second Chevrolet engine contract.

Hildebrand was released from his contract after the 2013 Indy 500. Ryan Briscoe and Oriol Servia alternated in the #4 car for the remainder of the season. Briscoe was injured in Race 1 of the Toronto doubleheader. With Servia unavailable, Panther Racing got Indy Lights points leader (at the time) Carlos Muñoz to drive the #4 for race 2.

=== 2014: closedown ===
In 2014, Panther Racing sued Rahal Letterman Lanigan Racing and IndyCar, alleging it lost the National Guard sponsorship worth $17.2 million because of bid rigging. Without the National Guard sponsorship, Panther did not field an entry for the start of the 2014 season. Colombian driver Carlos Huertas tested for Panther Racing at Sebring.

In April a report stated that only a skeleton staff remained with the organization, and their equipment was sold to KV Racing Technology to field a fourth entry for James Davison at the 2014 Indianapolis 500. The team announced that its remaining assets would be sold off at auction on July 23.

The team was officially listed as defunct in September 2014.

== Infiniti Pro Series/Indy Lights ==
Panther's 2003 Infiniti Pro Series car driven by Mark Taylor

In 2003 Panther Racing won the Infiniti Pro Series with Mark Taylor. He won 7 of the 12 races of the season and graduated to the IndyCar Series in 2004.

Hideki Muto finished 2nd in the 2007 Indy Pro Series for Super Aguri Panther Racing.

In 2008 Panther Racing fielded two cars in the Indy Lights Series. Brent Sherman competed in all 16 events. Dillon Battistini drove the other car but left for Team Moore Racing for the final race. He was replaced by Bobby Wilson. Battistini won four races.

Pippa Mann and Martin Plowman drove for Panther Racing in 2009. Both finished outside the top ten in the final standings.

== Drivers who have driven for Panther ==
- (United States) Dave Steele (1998–1999)
- (Canada) Scott Goodyear (1998–2000)
- (United States) Sam Hornish Jr. (2001–2003)
- (United Kingdom) Dan Wheldon (2002, 2009–2010)
- (United States) Billy Boat (2003) (Indy 500 only)
- (United States) Robby McGehee (2003) (Indy 500 only)
- (United Kingdom) Mark Taylor (2004)
- (United States) Townsend Bell (2004–2005; 2013 Indy 500)
- (South Africa) Tomas Scheckter (2004–2005)
- (Czech Republic) Tomáš Enge (2005)
- (United States) Buddy Lazier (2005)
- (Brazil) Vítor Meira (2006–2008)
- (Japan) Kosuke Matsuura (2007)
- (United States) John Andretti (2007) (Indy 500 only)
- (Japan) Hideki Mutoh (2007) (Chicagoland only)
- (United States) Scott Sharp (2009) (Indy 500 only)
- (United States) Ed Carpenter (2010)
- (United States) J. R. Hildebrand (2011–2013)
- (United States) Buddy Rice (2011) (Indy 500 only)
- (Australia) Ryan Briscoe (2013)
- (Spain) Oriol Servià (2013)
- (Colombia) Carlos Muñoz (2013)

== Racing results ==
=== Complete IRL IndyCar Series results ===
(key)

Year	Chassis	Engine	Drivers	No.	1	2	3	4	5	6	7	8	9	10	11	12	13	14	15	16	17	18	19
1998					WDW	PHX	INDY	TXS	NHA	DOV	CLT	PPIR	ATL	TXS	LSV								
1998	G-Force GF01B	Oldsmobile Aurora V8	(Canada) Scott Goodyear	4	17	6	24	4	2	6	3	18	4*	22	22								
1998	G-Force GF01B	Oldsmobile Aurora V8	(United States) Dave Steele	43										24	27								
1999					WDW	PHX	CLT	INDY	TXS	PPIR	ATL	DOV	PPIR	LSV	TXS								
1999	G-Force GF01C	Oldsmobile Aurora V8	(Canada) Scott Goodyear	4	2	1*	C^{1}	27	1	12	16*	17	21	25	23*								
1999	G-Force GF01C	Oldsmobile Aurora V8	(United States) Dave Steele	43				DNQ															
2000					WDW	PHX	LSV	INDY	TXS	PPIR	ATL	KTY	TXS										
2000	Dallara IR-00	Oldsmobile Aurora V8	(Canada) Scott Goodyear	4	4	2	12	9	5	16	11	2*	1										
2001					PHX	HMS	ATL	INDY	TXS	PPIR	RIR	KAN	NSH	KTY	GAT	CHI	TXS						
2001	Dallara IR-01	Oldsmobile Aurora V8	(United States) Sam Hornish Jr.	4	1*	1*	4	14	3	2*	2	2	6*	3	3*	2	1*						
2002					HMS	PHX	FON	NAZ	INDY	TXS	PPIR	RIR	KAN	NSH	MCH	KTY	GAT	CHI	TXS				
2002	Dallara IR-02	Chevrolet Indy V8	(United States) Sam Hornish Jr.	4	1*	3*	1*	17	25	18	3	1	2	3*	7	2	5	1*	1				
2002	Dallara IR-02	Chevrolet Indy V8	(United Kingdom) Dan Wheldon	15														10	15				
2003					HMS	PHX	MOT	INDY	TXS	PPIR	RIR	KAN	NSH	MCH	GAT	KTY	NAZ	CHI	FON	TXS			
2003	Dallara IR-03	Chevrolet Indy V8	(United States) Sam Hornish Jr.	4	10	21	6	15	10	5	4	17	11	2*	6	1*	2	1	1	17			
2003	Dallara IR-03	Chevrolet Indy V8	(United States) Robby McGehee	44				25															
2003	Dallara IR-03	Chevrolet Indy V8	(United States) Billy Boat	98				32															
2004					HMS	PHX	MOT	INDY	TXS	RIR	KAN	NSH	MIL	MCH	KTY	PPIR	NAZ	CHI	FON	TXS			
2004	Dallara IR-04	Chevrolet Indy V8	(United Kingdom) Mark Taylor	2	19	12	16	30	17	18													
2004	Dallara IR-04	Chevrolet Indy V8	(United States) Townsend Bell	2							17	5	6	8	21	12	18	22	9	9			
2004	Dallara IR-04	Chevrolet Indy V8	(South Africa) Tomas Scheckter	4	5	16	13	18	20	17	15	19	21	19	22	17	13	19	15	18			
2005					HMS	PHX	STP	MOT	INDY	TXS	RIR	KAN	NSH	MIL	MCH	KTY	PPIR	SNM	CHI	WGL	FON		
2005	Dallara IR-05	Chevrolet Indy V8	(Czech Republic) Tomáš Enge	2	21	20	16	DNS	19	19	7	11	23			11	6	5	20	13	8		
2005	Dallara IR-05	Chevrolet Indy V8	(United States) Townsend Bell	2											15								
2005	Dallara IR-05	Chevrolet Indy V8	(United States) Buddy Lazier	2										18									
2005	Dallara IR-05	Chevrolet Indy V8	(United States) Buddy Lazier	95					5				9		6	6			10				
2005	Dallara IR-05	Chevrolet Indy V8	(South Africa) Tomas Scheckter	4	11	17	17	10	20	1*	4	5	17	3	3	21	14	16	4	20	7*		
2006					HMS	STP	MOT	INDY	WGL	TXS	RIR	KAN	NSH	MIL	MCH	KTY	SNM	CHI					
2006	Dallara IR-05	Honda HI6R V8	(Brazil) Vítor Meira	4	16	5	10	10	2	6	2	3	3	15	2*	6	3	6					
2007					HMS	STP	MOT	KAN	INDY	MIL	TXS	IOW	RIR	WGL	NSH	MDO	MCH	KTY	SNM	DET	CHI		
2007	Dallara IR-05	Honda HI7R V8	(Brazil) Vítor Meira	4	4	16	17	8	10	5	5	9	9	17	10	17	18	10	9	15	18		
2007	Dallara IR-05	Honda HI7R V8	(United States) John Andretti	33					30														
2007	Dallara IR-05	Honda HI7R V8	(Japan) Kosuke Matsuura	55	16	17	18	18	16	11	9	15	17	8	16	12	4	11	10	5	17		
2007	Dallara IR-05	Honda HI7R V8	(Japan) Hideki Mutoh	60																	8		
2008					HMS	STP	MOT	LBH	KAN	INDY	MIL	TXS	IOW	RIR	WGL	NSH	MDO	EDM	KTY	SNM	DET	CHI	SRF^{2}
2008	Dallara IR-05	Honda HI7R V8	(Brazil) Vítor Meira	4	10	19	16		22	2	22	7	15	20	22	6	6	19	4	7	17	27	
2008	Dallara IR-05	Honda HI7R V8	(United Kingdom) Dan Wheldon	4																			11
2009					STP	LBH	KAN	INDY	MIL	TXS	IOW	RIR	WGL	TOR	EDM	KTY	MDO	SNM	CHI	MOT	HMS		
2009	Dallara IR-05	Honda HI7R V8	(United Kingdom) Dan Wheldon	4	14	5	10	2	10	7	4	10	10	14	15	11	16	12	22	8	21		
2009	Dallara IR-05	Honda HI7R V8	(United States) Scott Sharp	16				14															
2010					SAO	STP	ALA	LBH	KAN	INDY	TXS	IOW	WGL	TOR	EDM	MDO	SNM	CHI	KTY	MOT	HMS		
2010	Dallara IR-05	Honda HI7R V8	(United Kingdom) Dan Wheldon	4	5	20	11	9	15	2	9	11	6	10	20	14	25	2	3*	10	9		
2010	Dallara IR-05	Honda HI7R V8	(United States) Ed Carpenter	20						17								20	2		13		
2011					STP	ALA	LBH	SAO	INDY	TXS		MIL	IOW	TOR	EDM	MDO	NHA	SNM	BAL	MOT	KTY	LSV	
2011	Dallara IR-05	Honda HI7R V8	(United States) J. R. Hildebrand	4	11	13	17	10	2	23	18	21	4	8	11	25	21	23	19	7	20	C^{3}	
2011	Dallara IR-05	Honda HI7R V8	(United States) Buddy Rice	44					18												9	C^{3}	
2012					STP	ALA	LBH	SAO	INDY	DET	TEX	MIL	IOW	TOR	EDM	MDO	SNM	BAL	FON				
2012	Dallara DW12	Chevrolet IndyCar V6t	(United States) J. R. Hildebrand	4	19	15	5	7	14	14	5	22	22	7	21	9	8	12	11				
2013					STP	ALA	LBH	SAO	INDY	DET		TXS	MIL	IOW	POC	TOR		MDO	SNM	BAL	HOU		FON
2013	Dallara DW12	Chevrolet IndyCar V6t	(United States) J. R. Hildebrand	4	19	17	5	15	33														
2013	Dallara DW12	Chevrolet IndyCar V6t	(Australia) Ryan Briscoe	4						21	13		15		14	22	DNS		17				
2013	Dallara DW12	Chevrolet IndyCar V6t	(Spain) Oriol Servià	4								19		7				14		12	19	7	19
2013	Dallara DW12	Chevrolet IndyCar V6t	(Colombia) Carlos Muñoz	4													17						
2013	Dallara DW12	Chevrolet IndyCar V6t	(United States) Townsend Bell	60					27														

1. The 1999 VisionAire 500K at Charlotte was cancelled after 79 laps due to spectator fatalities.
2. Non-points-paying, exhibition race.
3. The final race at Las Vegas was canceled due to Dan Wheldon's death.
