= 2007 Firestone Indy 200 =

Indycar race held in Lebanon, Tennessee

Track map of Nashville Superspeedway

The 2007 Firestone Indy 200 was a race in the 2007 IRL IndyCar Series, held at Nashville Superspeedway. It was originally to be held over 12 -July 14, 2007, as the eleventh round of the seventeen-race calendar. However, persistent rain pushed the race back to July 15, 2007.

== Classification ==
Fin. Pos	Car No.	Driver	Team	Laps	Time/Retired	Grid	Laps Led	Points
1	9	(New Zealand) Scott Dixon	Chip Ganassi Racing	200	1:35:06.2615	1	105	50+3
2	27	(United Kingdom) Dario Franchitti	Andretti Green Racing	200	+2.3400	2	88	40
3	7	(United States) Danica Patrick	Andretti Green Racing	200	+3.1884	7	0	35
4	6	(United States) Sam Hornish Jr.	Team Penske	200	+3.2914	4	0	32
5	26	(United States) Marco Andretti	Andretti Green Racing	200	+4.1409	8	0	30
6	3	(Brazil) Hélio Castroneves	Team Penske	200	+4.5098	6	0	28
7	8	(United States) Scott Sharp	Rahal Letterman Racing	200	+5.2449	10	0	26
8	10	(United Kingdom) Dan Wheldon	Chip Ganassi Racing	200	+5.7581	5	4	24
9	14	(United Kingdom) Darren Manning	A.J. Foyt Racing	199	+1 Lap	17	0	22
10	4	(Brazil) Vítor Meira	Panther Racing	199	+1 Lap	14	3	20
11	2	(South Africa) Tomas Scheckter	Vision Racing	199	+1 Lap	12	0	19
12	22	(United States) A. J. Foyt IV	Vision Racing	198	+2 Laps	11	0	18
13	20	(United States) Ed Carpenter	Vision Racing	197	+3 Laps	13	0	17
14	17	(United States) Jeff Simmons	Rahal Letterman Racing	196	+4 Laps	9	0	16
15	5	(United States) Sarah Fisher	Dreyer & Reinbold Racing	194	+6 Laps	16	0	15
16	55	(Japan) Kosuke Matsuura	Panther Racing	182	Accident	18	0	14
17	15	(United States) Buddy Rice	Dreyer & Reinbold Racing	166	Handling	15	0	13
18	11	(Brazil) Tony Kanaan	Andretti Green Racing	35	Accident	3	0	12
Lead changes: 7 between 4 drivers
