= Thiago Medeiros =

Brazilian racing driver (born 1982)

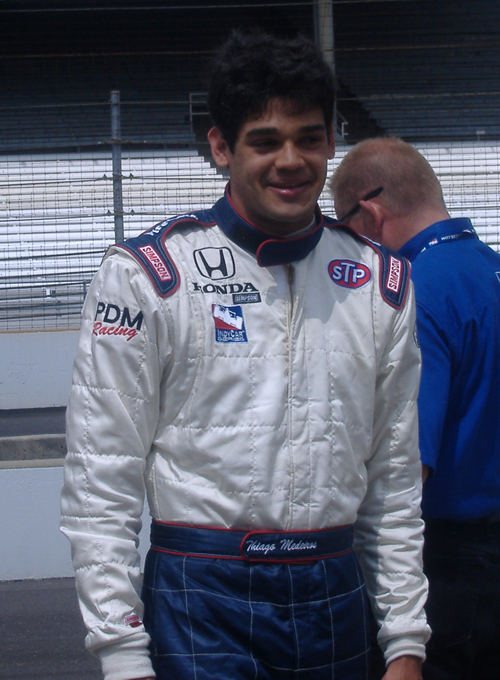
- Medeiros in the pits during 2006 Indy 500 Carb Day
- Nationality: Brazil
- Born: Thiago Cavalcante de Medeiros; July 24, 1982 (age 44) São Paulo, Brazil

Indy Pro Series
- Years active: 2003–2004, 2006
- Teams: Genoa Racing; Sam Schmidt Motorsports; AFS Racing
- Starts: 25
- Wins: 7
- Poles: 9
- Best finish: 1st in 2004

Previous series
- 2007–2008 2006 2006 1999–2002: Stock Car Brasil; USAC Silver Crown Series; Indianapolis 500; Formula Three Sudamericana

Thiago Cavalcante de Medeiros (born July 24, 1982 in São Paulo) is a retired Brazilian racing driver.

After racing in Formula Three Sudamericana from 1999 to 2002, finishing third in 2001 and fourth in 2002, Medeiros came to the United States in 2003 to race in the Infiniti Pro Series for Genoa Racing. He started his first race from the pole at Homestead and captured his first victory in the final race of the season at Texas Motor Speedway. He switched to Sam Schmidt Motorsports in 2004 and had a dream season, albeit in a season where the field of most races was very small. Medeiros captured six wins, all from the pole, on his way to the championship.

Medeiros attempted to make his IndyCar Series debut in the last race of the 2005 season at California Speedway for Dreyer & Reinbold Racing. However, he crashed in practice and could not make a qualifying attempt or participate in the race. He returned to the series and attempted to qualify for the 2006 Indianapolis 500 in a car fielded by PDM Racing, his USAC Silver Crown Series team. On Bump Day, he made the grid taking the 33rd and final spot on the grid and finished 31st in the race after an electrical problem.

Medeiros returned to his native Brazil to drive in Stock Car Brasil. He retired from racing in 2007 and started a new career flying helicopters. He currently lives in Dubai.

== Racing record ==
=== American open-wheel racing results ===
(key)

==== Indy Pro Series ====
Year	Team	1	2	3	4	5	6	7	8	9	10	11	12	Rank	Points	Ref
2003	Genoa Racing	HMS; 2	PHX; 2	INDY; 19	PPIR; 6	KAN; 7	NSH; 5	MIS; 3	STL; 11	KTY; 3	CHI; 9	FON; 3	TXS; 1	4th	371	
2004	Sam Schmidt Motorsports	HMS; 2	PHX; 1	INDY; 1	KAN; 1	NSH; 1	MIL; 6	MIS; 2	KTY; 6	PPIR; 3	CHI; 1	FON; 9	TXS; 1	1st	513	
2006	AFS Racing	HMS	STP1	STP2	INDY	WGL	IMS	NSH	MIL; 6	KTY	SNM1	SNM2	CHI	34th	28	

==== IRL IndyCar Series ====
Year	Team	Chassis	No.	Engine	1	2	3	4	5	6	7	8	9	10	11	12	13	14	15	16	17	Rank	Points	Ref
2005	Dreyer & Reinbold Racing	Dallara IR-05	44	Honda HI5R V8	HMS	PHX	STP	MOT	INDY	TXS	RIR	KAN	NSH	MIL	MCH	KTY	PPIR	SNM	CHI	WGL	FON; DNS	32nd	12	
2006	PDM Racing	Panoz GF09C	18	Honda HI6R V8	HMS	STP	MOT	INDY; 31	WGL	TXS	RIR	KAN	NSH	MIL	MIS	KTY	SNM	CHI				39th	10	

==== Indianapolis 500 ====
Year	Chassis	Engine	Start	Finish	Team
2006	Panoz	Honda	33	31	PDM Racing

Sporting positions
Preceded by Mark Taylor	Infiniti Pro Series Champion; 2004	Succeeded by Wade Cunningham
