= Chesson =

Chesson is a surname. Notable people with the surname include:

Surname

- Frederick Chesson (1833–1888), English journalist and anti-slavery campaigner
- Henry Chesson (1862–1948), Australian politician
- James Chesson (born 1980), American racing driver
- Jehu Chesson (born 1993), American football player
- Lisa Chesson (born 1986), American ice hockey player
- Nora Chesson (1871–1906), English poet
- P. J. Chesson (born 1978), American race car driver
- Thomas Chesson (1867–1943), Australian politician
- Wes Chesson, American football player

Given name

- Chesson Hadley (born 1987), American golfer

== See also ==
- Cesson
- Rochesson
