= 2004 Infiniti Pro Series =

2004 Infiniti Pro Series season
- Infiniti Pro Series

Season
- Races: 12
- Start date: February 29
- End date: October 16

Awards
- Drivers' champion: (Brazil) Thiago Medeiros
- Teams' champion: (United States) Sam Schmidt Motorsports
- Rookie of the Year: (United States) P. J. Chesson

The 2004 Menards IRL Infiniti Pro Series season was the third season of the series under the Indy Racing League ownership, and the 19th in Indy NXT combined history, as officially recognized by IndyCar. All teams used Dallara IL-02 chassis and Infiniti engines.

In his second year of Pro Series competition, Thiago Medeiros won the championship convincingly, giving Sam Schmidt Motorsports its first title. He won six wins, including the second running of the Freedom 100 from pole position, scored seven pole positions and led the most laps in all but two of the 12 races. Medeiros became champion by taking the green flag at the penultimate round in Chicagoland, and finished with a 134-point lead over Paul Dana, who scored his lone Infiniti Pro Series win at Milwaukee.

Despite joining the Infiniti Pro Series at the fourth round in Kansas, rookie P. J. Chesson rallied to a fourth place in the standings, including a three-win streak with newcomers Mo Nunn Racing, an effort instigated and managed by Nunn's wife Kathryn. Despite a penalty at the last round that demoted him behind Arie Luyendyk Jr. in the standings, Chesson won Rookie of the Year over Leonardo Maia by 25 points.

A. J. Foyt Enterprises and Panther Racing, the champions of the previous two editions, left the series, although Foyt entered a car for Jeff Simmons at the Freedom 100, finishing second behind Medeiros. Simmons and Marty Roth became the first drivers to contest the Indianapolis 500 and the Freedom 100 in the same year. Sinden Racing Service and Genoa Racing also left the series entirely, while the privateer effort by Matt Beardsley ceased to be after the Freedom 100. On the other hand, Roquin Motorsports re-expanded to a full time effort, Roth Racing, Racing Professionals and Bullet-Team Motorsports made their debut with partial seasons, apart from Mo Nunn joining the championship at the fourth round.

While the Freedom 100 attracted 17 competitors, the Infiniti Pro Series struggled with entries throughout much of 2004, especially during the summer stretch, with only nine cars and just three finishers at the Milwaukee round. Grid sizes improved over the last three races, with 15 drivers in each round. Only the top 3 drivers in the standings contested the full season, with two others missing one round. Former IndyCar drivers that competed during the season were Billy Roe, Jon Herb, Cory Witherill and Scott Mayer.

== Team and driver chart ==
Team	No.	Drivers	Rounds
Keith Duesenberg Racing	2	(United States) Phil Giebler	1–3, 11
Keith Duesenberg Racing	2	(United States) Alfred Unser	4–10, 12
Keith Duesenberg Racing	22	(United States) Ross Fonferko	5
Keith Duesenberg Racing	22	(United States) Phil Giebler	7–9
Keith Duesenberg Racing	22	(United States) P. J. Abbott	12
Brian Stewart Racing	3	(Canada) Jesse Mason	1–10
Brian Stewart Racing	3	(Canada) Marty Roth	11
Brian Stewart Racing	3	(United States) Ryan Hampton	12
Brian Stewart Racing	33	(United States) Tony Turco	1
Brian Stewart Racing	33	(Brazil) Leonardo Maia	2–12
Roth Racing	4	(Canada) Marty Roth	1–3
Sam Schmidt Motorsports	5	(Netherlands) Arie Luyendyk Jr.	1–7
Sam Schmidt Motorsports	5	(United States) Travis Gregg	8, 10, 12
Sam Schmidt Motorsports	5	(Japan) Shinji Kashima	11
Sam Schmidt Motorsports	11	(Brazil) Thiago Medeiros	All
Sam Schmidt Motorsports	64	(United States) Brad Pollard	4–6
Sam Schmidt Motorsports	64	(United States) Scott Mayer	10, 12
Sam Schmidt Motorsports	64	(United States) P. J. Abbott	11
Racing Professionals	6	(United States) Jon Herb	3, 11–12
Roquin Motorsports	9	(United States) Matt Beardsley	9
Roquin Motorsports	10	(Mexico) Rolando Quintanilla	1–5, 7–12
Beardsley Motorsports	12	(United States) Matt Beardsley	1–3
A. J. Foyt Enterprises	14	(United States) Jeff Simmons	3
Bullet-Team Motorsports	21	(United States) Taylor Fletcher	3, 10–11
Kenn Hardley Racing	24	(United States) Brad Pollard	1–3
Kenn Hardley Racing	24	(United States) Jeff Simmons	9–12
Kenn Hardley Racing	24	(United States) Billy Roe	4–8
Kenn Hardley Racing	42	(United States) Billy Roe	2–3
AFS Racing	25	(United States) Jay Drake	3
AFS Racing	25	(Netherlands) Arie Luyendyk Jr.	10–12
AFS Racing	27	(Netherlands) Arie Luyendyk Jr.	8–9
AFS Racing	27	(United States) Gary Peterson	2–3, 7, 10–12
Mo Nunn Racing	67	(United States) James Chesson	10–12
Mo Nunn Racing	76	(United States) P. J. Chesson	4–12
Hemelgarn 91/Johnson Motorsports	91	(United States) Paul Dana	All
Hemelgarn 91/Johnson Motorsports	92	(United States) Cory Witherill	3, 10

== Schedule ==
The schedule for 2004 stayed at 12 rounds with minor date changes over 2003. Mirroring the IRL IndyCar Series, the series left Gateway International Raceway and visited the storied Milwaukee Mile, who had featured in the last season of the original Indy Lights championship in 2001. This would be the last all-oval season for the series, as the IRL-managed championship would introduce road course racing from 2005 onwards.

Rd.	Date	Race name	Track	Location
1	February 29	Homestead-Miami 100	Homestead–Miami Speedway	Homestead, Florida
2	March 20	Phoenix 100	Phoenix International Raceway	Avondale, Arizona
3	May 22	Futaba Freedom 100	Indianapolis Motor Speedway	Speedway, Indiana
4	July 3	Aventis Racing for Kids 100	Kansas Speedway	Kansas City, Kansas
5	July 17	Cleanevent 100	Nashville Superspeedway	Lebanon, Tennessee
6	July 25	Milwaukee 100	Milwaukee Mile	West Allis, Wisconsin
7	August 1	Paramount Health Insurance 100	Michigan International Speedway	Brooklyn, Michigan
8	August 14	Kentucky 100	Kentucky Speedway	Sparta, Kentucky
9	August 22	Pikes Peak 100	Pikes Peak International Raceway	Fountain, Colorado
10	September 11	Chicago 100	Chicagoland Speedway	Joliet, Illinois
11	October 2	California 100	California Speedway	Fontana, California
12	October 16	Texas 100	Texas Motor Speedway	Fort Worth, Texas

== Race results ==
Round	Race	Pole position	Fastest lap	Most laps led	Race Winner	
Round	Race	Pole position	Fastest lap	Most laps led	Driver	Team
1	Homestead–Miami Speedway	(United States) Phil Giebler	(Brazil) Thiago Medeiros	(Brazil) Thiago Medeiros	(United States) Phil Giebler	Keith Duesenberg Racing
2	Phoenix International Raceway	(Brazil) Thiago Medeiros	(Brazil) Thiago Medeiros	(Brazil) Thiago Medeiros	(Brazil) Thiago Medeiros	Sam Schmidt Motorsports
3	Indianapolis Motor Speedway	(Brazil) Thiago Medeiros	(Brazil) Thiago Medeiros	(Brazil) Thiago Medeiros	(Brazil) Thiago Medeiros	Sam Schmidt Motorsports
4	Kansas Speedway	(Brazil) Thiago Medeiros (Note: Qualifying for Kansas was cancelled due to rain. The grid was set by entrant points entering the race.)	(United States) Alfred Unser	(Brazil) Thiago Medeiros	(Brazil) Thiago Medeiros	Sam Schmidt Motorsports
5	Nashville Superspeedway	(Brazil) Thiago Medeiros	(United States) Paul Dana	(Brazil) Thiago Medeiros	(Brazil) Thiago Medeiros	Sam Schmidt Motorsports
6	Milwaukee Mile	(Brazil) Thiago Medeiros	(Brazil) Thiago Medeiros	(Brazil) Thiago Medeiros	(United States) Paul Dana	Hemelgarn 91/Johnson Motorsports
7	Michigan International Speedway	(United States) Alfred Unser	(United States) Alfred Unser	(Brazil) Thiago Medeiros	(United States) P. J. Chesson	Mo Nunn Racing
8	Kentucky Speedway	(United States) Travis Gregg	(United States) Phil Giebler	(United States) Travis Gregg	(United States) P. J. Chesson	Mo Nunn Racing
9	Pikes Peak International Raceway	(United States) Jeff Simmons	(United States) Paul Dana	(United States) Paul Dana	(United States) P. J. Chesson	Mo Nunn Racing
10	Chicagoland Speedway	(Brazil) Thiago Medeiros	(United States) Travis Gregg	(Brazil) Thiago Medeiros	(Brazil) Thiago Medeiros	Sam Schmidt Motorsports
11	California Speedway	(Brazil) Thiago Medeiros	(United States) James Chesson	(Brazil) Thiago Medeiros	(United States) James Chesson	Mo Nunn Racing
12	Texas Motor Speedway	(Brazil) Thiago Medeiros	(United States) P. J. Chesson	(Brazil) Thiago Medeiros	(Brazil) Thiago Medeiros	Sam Schmidt Motorsports

== Championship standings ==
=== Drivers' Championship ===
Scoring system

Position	**1st**	**2nd**	**3rd**	**4th**	**5th**	**6th**	**7th**	**8th**	**9th**	**10th**	**11th**	**12th**	**13th**	**14th**	**15th**	**16th**	**17th**	**18th**	**19th**
Points	50	40	35	32	30	28	26	24	22	20	19	18	17	16	15	14	13	12	11

- The driver who leads the most laps in a race is awarded two additional points.

Pos	Driver	HOM	PHX	INDY	KAN	NSH	MIL	MIS	KEN	PIK	CHI	FON	TXS	Points
1	(Brazil) Thiago Medeiros	2*	**1***	**1***	**1***^{1}	**1***	**6***	2*	6	3	**1***	**9***	**1***	513
2	(United States) Paul Dana	**8**	5	10	2	2	1	4	2	2*	8	12	11	379
3	(Netherlands) Arie Luyendyk Jr.	9	2	3	7	11	9	8	4	5	4	14	4	330
4	(United States) P. J. Chesson RY				8	6	2	1	1	1	5	2	5	317 (Note: 25 point deduction at Texas for causing a debris situation that produced a crash.)
5	(Brazil) Leonardo Maia R		3	6	10	10	7	7	3	7	7	4	12	292
6	(Canada) Jesse Mason R	3	4	15	6	3	4	6	8	4	9			283
7	(Mexico) Rolando Quintanilla	6	6	14	4	9		11	7	11	10	5	8	264
8	(United States) Alfred Unser R				3	5	3	**3**	11	6	3		3	252
9	(United States) Phil Giebler R	1	7	5				5	10	8		3		215
10	(United States) Billy Roe		9	9	9	4	8	10	9					164
11	(United States) Brad Pollard R	5	11	11	5	8	5							152
12	(United States) Jeff Simmons			2						**9**	2	10	6	150
13	(United States) Gary Peterson		12	13				9			14	8	15	112
14	(United States) James Chesson R										6	1	13	95
15	(United States) Travis Gregg R								**5***		13		2	89
16	(United States) Matt Beardsley	10	8	8						10				88
17	(Canada) Marty Roth	7	10	16								11		79
18	(United States) Jon Herb R			17								6	7	67
19	(United States) Taylor Fletcher R			12							11	15		52
20	(United States) P. J. Abbott R											7	9	48
21	(United States) Cory Witherill			7							15			41
22	(United States) Scott Mayer R										12		10	38
23	(United States) Tony Turco	4												32
24	(United States) Jay Drake R			4										32
25	(United States) Ross Fonferko R					7								26
26	(Japan) Shinji Kashima R											13		17
27	(United States) Ryan Hampton												14	16
Pos	Driver	HOM	PHX	INDY	KAN	NSH	MIL	MIS	KEN	PIK	CHI	FON	TXS	Points

Color	Result
Gold	Winner
Silver	2nd place
Bronze	3rd place
Green	4th & 5th place
Light Blue	6th–10th place
Dark Blue	Finished (Outside Top 10)
Purple	Did not finish
Red	Did not qualify (DNQ)
Brown	Withdrawn (Wth)
Black	Disqualified (DSQ)
White	Did not start (DNS)
Blank	Did not participate (DNP)
Blank	Not competing

**In-line notation**
**Bold**	Pole position
Italics	Ran fastest race lap
*	Led most race laps (2 points)
^{1}	Qualifying cancelled

- Ties in points broken by number of wins, or best finishes.
