= 2006 Toyota Indy 300 =

IndyCar race held in Homestead, Florida

(United States) 2006 Toyota Indy 300
Race details
- Race 1 of 14 in the 2006 IndyCar season
- Layout of the Homestead–Miami Speedway circuit
- Date: March 26, 2006
- Official name: Toyota Indy 300 Presented by XM Satellite Radio
- Location: Homestead–Miami Speedway, Homestead, Florida, United States
- Course: Permanent racing facility 1.500 mi / 2.414 km
- Distance: 200 laps 300.000 mi / 482.803 km

Pole position
- Driver: (United States) Sam Hornish Jr. (Team Penske)
- Time: 24.4625

Fastest lap
- Driver: (New Zealand) Scott Dixon (Chip Ganassi Racing)
- Time: 24.7198 (on lap 195 of 200)

Podium
- First: (United Kingdom) Dan Wheldon (Chip Ganassi Racing)
- Second: (Brazil) Hélio Castroneves (Team Penske)
- Third: (United States) Sam Hornish Jr. (Team Penske)

Chronology
Previous	Next
2005	2007

The 2006 Toyota Indy 300 Presented by XM Satellite Radio was an IRL IndyCar Series open-wheel race held on March 26, 2006, at the Homestead–Miami Speedway in Homestead, Florida. It was the first round of the 2006 IRL IndyCar Series season and the eleventh edition of the event (sixth under Indy Racing League (IRL) sanctioning). Chip Ganassi Racing driver Dan Wheldon won the 200-lap race; Hélio Castroneves and Sam Hornish Jr., both of Team Penske, completed the podium in second and third place, respectively.

Hornish Jr. won the pole position and dominated the first three-quarters of the race, leading a race-high 145 laps and only forfeiting the lead during green-flag pit stops. However, as Hornish Jr. pitted on lap 161, a caution was flown for a spin involving Tony Kanaan, which sent Hornish Jr. to the back of the field. From there, Castroneves inherited the first position, but engaged in an intense battle for the lead with Wheldon in the final twenty laps of the race. Wheldon, who led eight laps, emerged victorious by 0.0147 seconds over Castroneves after overtaking him on the final corner of the final lap. It was the ninth-closest finish in series history.

The race was marred by a violent crash in the warm-up session several hours prior to the race, which claimed the life of rookie driver Paul Dana. Dana slammed into the rear of Ed Carpenter and died two hours later. Carpenter suffered injuries to his lungs, though he recovered. To honor Dana, his Rahal Letterman Racing teammates, Buddy Rice and Danica Patrick, withdrew from the race.

== Background ==
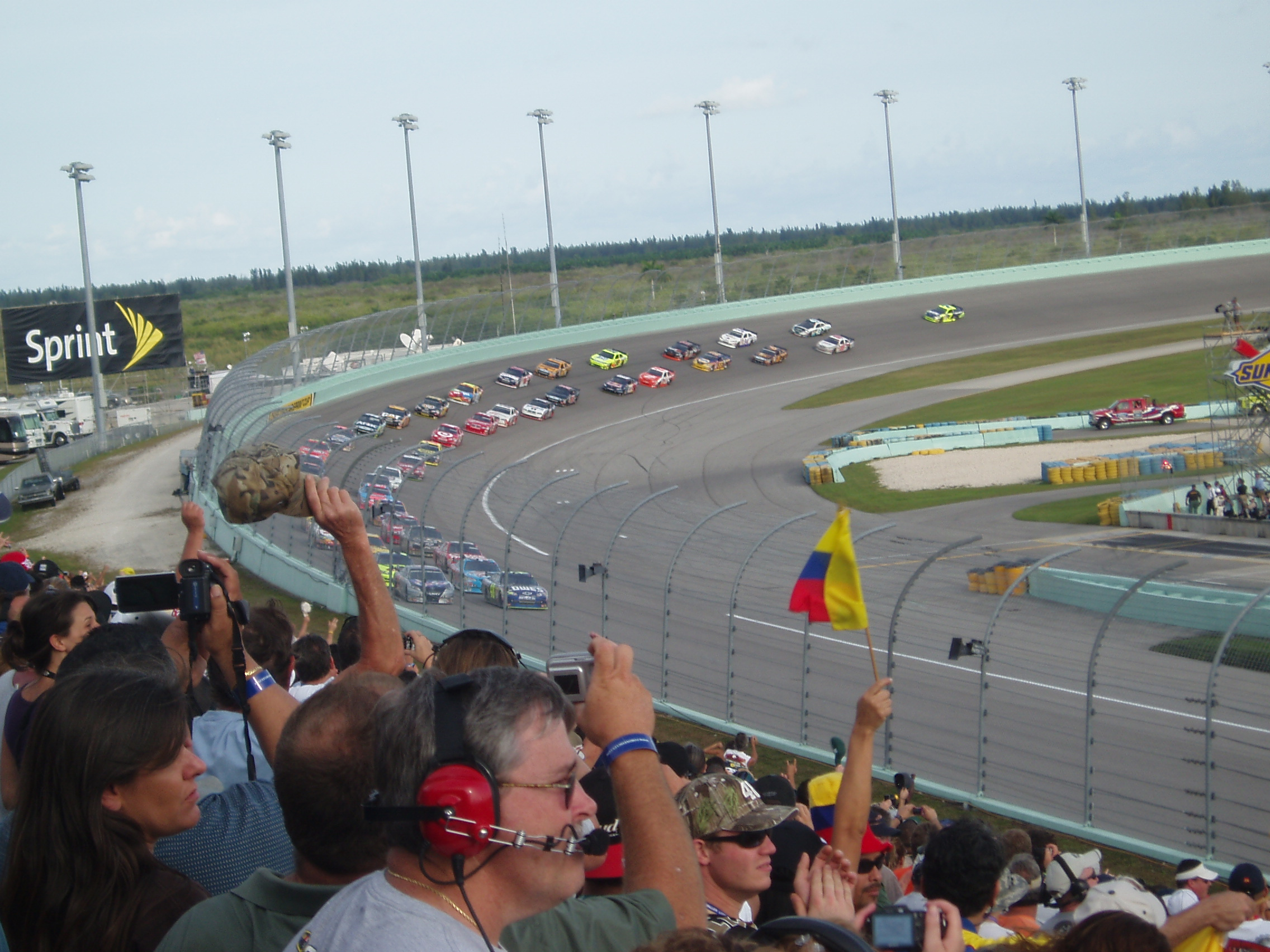
Homestead–Miami Speedway (pictured in 2009), where the race was held.

The Toyota Indy 300 was confirmed to be on the Indy Racing League (IRL)'s 2006 schedule in September 2005. It was the first of 14 scheduled races for 2006, the eleventh annual edition of the event (dating back to 1996), and the fifth consecutive year that the race hosted the season opener. It took place on March 26, 2006, at the Homestead–Miami Speedway, a 1.5 mi (2.4 km) intermediate oval-shaped asphalt race circuit, in Homestead, Florida, United States, and was contested over 200 laps and 300 miles (480 km). Dan Wheldon was the defending race winner.

Several drivers changed teams ahead of the 2006 season, which marked the ten-year anniversary of the Indy Racing League. Arguably the biggest storyline from the offseason was reigning IndyCar champion Wheldon's move to Target Chip Ganassi Racing's #10 entry. Ganassi also announced his switch from the Toyota engine and Panoz chassis to Honda and Dallara. With the #26 Andretti Green Racing entry left vacant, rookie driver Marco Andretti, son of AGR team owner Michael Andretti, was tasked to drive the car full-time in 2006. In January, Paul Dana, who suffered a season-ending injury during a practice crash for the 2005 Indianapolis 500, announced his return to IndyCar with Rahal Letterman Racing, becoming the second Rookie of the Year contender. Finally, famed NBA player Carmelo Anthony announced his partnership with Hemelgarn Racing to field the #91 entry for P. J. Chesson. Another big storyline was the return of 1998 Indianapolis 500 winner Eddie Cheever, who announced in February that he was planning to run the first four races of the season, including that year's Indianapolis 500. Chevrolet and Toyota both withdrew from IndyCar during the off-season, leaving Honda as the sole engine provider.

Prior to the Homestead race weekend, two testing sessions were held for all IndyCar teams in order for them to become familiarized with their new Honda engines. The first was held at the Phoenix Raceway in Avondale, Arizona, on January 24 and January 25, and was not open to the public. Fifteen IndyCar teams took to the track on the first day, with Tony Kanaan setting the fastest lap at a time of 20.6161 seconds and a speed of 174.621 mph (281.025 km/h). On the second day, Wheldon continued to prove his strength despite the team change with a blistering time of 20.1700 seconds and a speed of 178.483 mph (287.241 km/h), becoming the only driver to pass the 178-mph mark in the session. The second pre-season test was held at the Homestead–Miami Speedway on March 2, March 3, and March 5; the first two days of testing were held on the road course configuration, while the third day was held on the oval configuration. On the first day of testing, recently retired NASCAR driver Rusty Wallace took a drive in a Marlboro Team Penske-prepared Honda car to prepare for his role as an analyst for IndyCar broadcasts on ABC Sports and ESPN. The tests were considered a success, as Castroneves swept both days of testing on the road course, with a fastest overall lap of 1 minute and 10.5683 seconds and a speed of 112.742 mph (181.441 km/h). Wheldon's chart-topping lap of 24.5088 seconds and 218.126 mph (351.040 km/h) on the oval on March 5 was faster than the official track record set by Buddy Rice in 2004. The top ten drivers were also separated by less than four tenths of a second, leading anticipation to build for the season opener.

After the road course testing sessions at Homestead, Target Chip Ganassi Racing announced that they would revert to Panoz chassis for the three road course races of the 2006 season. Team director Mike Hull stated that their knowledge of the Panoz chassis on road courses influenced their decision: "It was a team decision. We have a lot of information about the Panoz car, and we think the Panoz on a road track is a great race car. We've committed ourselves to running a Dallara car on all the ovals, but with the limited amount of testing we have with the series, we felt we should take things one step at a time."

== Practice and qualifying ==
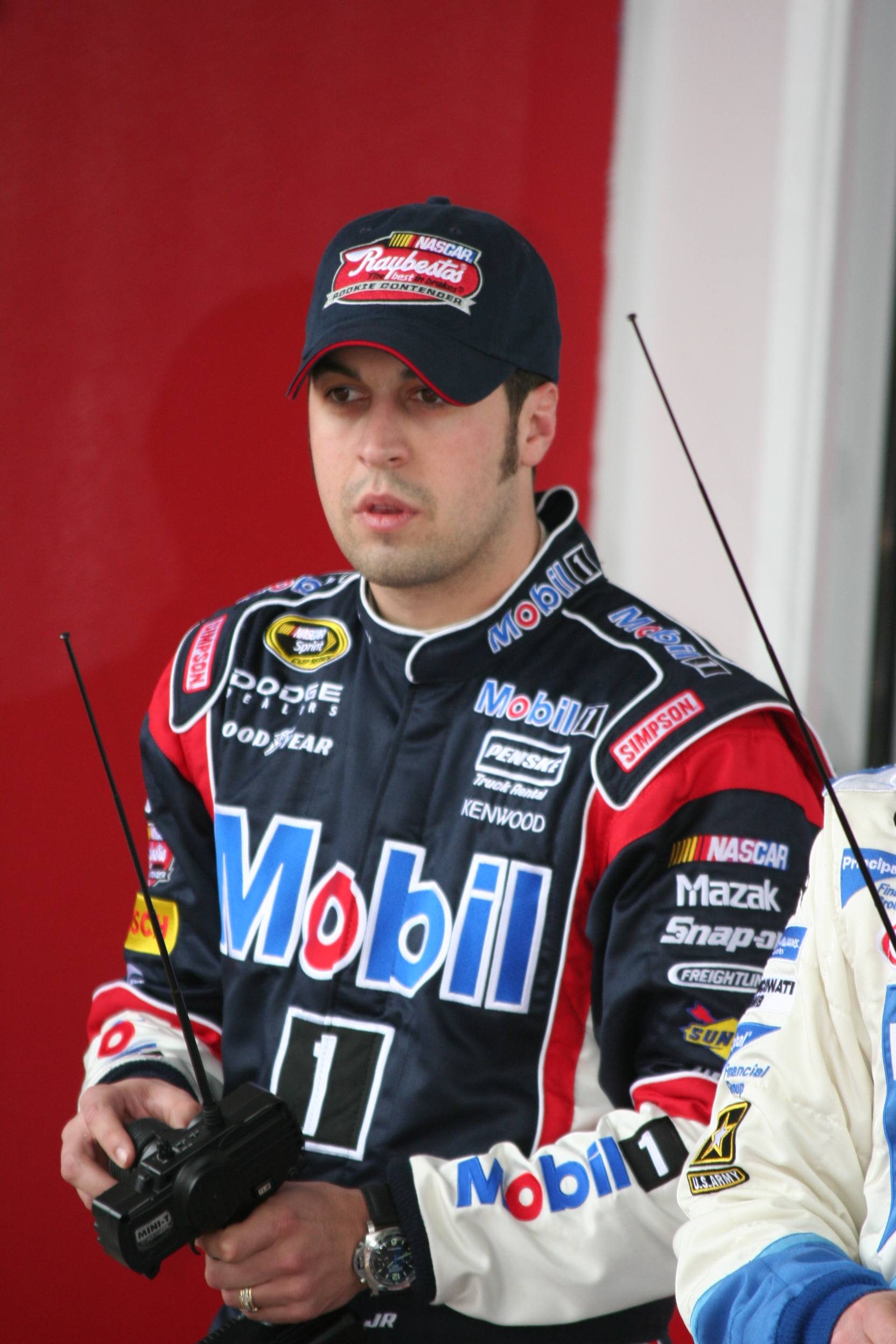
Sam Hornish Jr. (pictured in 2008) won his seventh career pole position.

Three practice sessions were held prior to the race, two on Friday and one on Saturday. The first session began at 10:30 AM local time and lasted for 60 minutes. The second session began at 2:00 PM local time and lasted for 90 minutes. The final session began at 10:30 AM and lasted for 60 minutes. All three sessions were divided into two groups. Scott Dixon led the first session with a time of 24.8974 seconds, ahead of Sam Hornish Jr., Kanaan, Hélio Castroneves, and Bryan Herta. Wheldon was fastest during the session on Friday afternoon with a time of 24.8004 seconds. Dixon, Castroneves, Hornish Jr., and Kanaan rounded out the top five. The only incident occurred three minutes into the session, when Vítor Meira spun into the SAFER barrier in turn four after a suspension failure. Despite heavy damage to the right side and rear of the car, Meira was uninjured and resorted to a backup car for qualifying. The next morning, Castroneves put down the fastest time of 24.5736 seconds. Hornish Jr., Dixon, Tomas Scheckter, and Dario Franchitti took positions second through fifth.

Qualifying was held on Saturday at 2:45 PM local time. Each driver was required to run two laps in their qualifying attempt; the best of the two laps would determine their starting position. Conditions for the session were reportedly quite warm, with ambient temperatures at 77 °F (25 °C). Hornish Jr. grabbed his seventh career pole position with a time of 24.4625 seconds and a speed of 218.539 mph (351.704 km/h), breaking Rice's 2004 track record. Castroneves, Hornish Jr.'s teammate, joined him on the front row. Dixon, Danica Patrick, Kanaan, Rice, Franchitti, Wheldon, Dana, and Felipe Giaffone rounded out the top ten, and Herta, Scheckter, Ed Carpenter, Kosuke Matsuura, Scott Sharp, Cheever, Andretti, Buddy Lazier, Meira, and Chesson filled out the remaining ten starting positions. Unlike the other drivers, Lazier was only permitted to run one lap because of a gear change. After qualifying, Hornish Jr. described his mindset heading into qualifying: "The past couple of days we've been out here, we've been up towards the top of the speed charts. We were trying to be a little bit conservative and make sure that we had good race setup. When it came time for qualifying, we put as little downforce as we could on it and went out there and tried to hold on to it."

=== Qualifying classification ===
Key	Meaning
**R**	Rookie
**W**	Past winner

Pos	No.	Driver	Team	Chassis	Lap 1	Lap 2	Final grid
1	6	(United States) Sam Hornish Jr. W	Marlboro Team Penske	Dallara	**24.4625**	24.4722	1
2	3	(Brazil) Hélio Castroneves	Marlboro Team Penske	Dallara	**24.5131**	24.5175	2
3	9	(New Zealand) Scott Dixon W	Target Chip Ganassi Racing	Dallara	24.7384	**24.6589**	3
4	16	(United States) Danica Patrick	Rahal Letterman Racing	Panoz	24.7384	**24.6589**	17^{1}
5	11	(Brazil) Tony Kanaan	Andretti Green Racing	Dallara	24.7578	**24.7296**	4
6	15	(United States) Buddy Rice	Rahal Letterman Racing	Panoz	24.7720	**24.7600**	18^{1}
7	27	(United Kingdom) Dario Franchitti	Andretti Green Racing	Dallara	**24.7664**	24.7731	5
8	10	(United Kingdom) Dan Wheldon W	Target Chip Ganassi Racing	Dallara	24.8417	**24.7725**	6
9	17	(United States) Paul Dana R	Rahal Letterman Racing	Panoz	24.8160	**24.7967**	19^{1}
10	14	(Brazil) Felipe Giaffone	A. J. Foyt Racing	Dallara	**24.8117**	24.8574	7
11	7	(United States) Bryan Herta	Andretti Green Racing	Dallara	24.9775	**24.8192**	8
12	2	(South Africa) Tomas Scheckter	Vision Racing	Dallara	24.8567	**24.8337**	9
13	20	(United States) Ed Carpenter	Vision Racing	Dallara	24.8692	**24.8399**	20^{1}
14	55	(Japan) Kosuke Matsuura	Super Aguri Fernández Racing	Dallara	24.8467	**24.8432**	10
15	8	(United States) Scott Sharp	Delphi Fernández Racing	Dallara	24.9285	**24.8896**	11
16	51	(United States) Eddie Cheever	Cheever Racing	Dallara	25.0998	**24.9690**	12
17	26	(United States) Marco Andretti R	Andretti Green Racing	Dallara	**24.9813**	25.0022	13
18	5	(United States) Buddy Lazier	Dreyer & Reinbold Racing	Dallara	**24.9878**	—N/a	14
19	4	(Brazil) Vítor Meira	Panther Racing	Dallara	25.0320	**24.9892**	15
20	91	(United States) P. J. Chesson R	Hemelgarn Racing	Dallara	**25.2025**	25.2439	16
Official qualifying results

Notes

- **Bold text** indicates fastest time set in session.
- **^1** – During final practice, Paul Dana crashed into Ed Carpenter, which led to Dana's death and Carpenter was injured. Both teams withdrew their entries -- Vision Racing withdrew their #20 entry and Rahal Letterman Racing withdrew the #15, #16, and #17 entries. By rule, the qualifying positions were used to determine final finishing positions and half points were awarded to the entries.

== Warmup ==
On Sunday, at 10:00 AM local time, the drivers took to the track for a planned thirty-minute warmup session. Carpenter set the fastest lap of the session with a time of 25.9465 seconds, ahead of Kanaan, Patrick, Rice, and Herta.

=== Death of Paul Dana ===
About three minutes into the session (10:03 AM local time), Carpenter spun in turn two and made heavy contact with the SAFER barrier. As Carpenter's car slid down the track, the caution lights had turned on and several drivers immediately slowed down at the scene of the crash. Unfortunately, Dana continued driving at an estimated speed of 176 mph (283 km/h) and slammed head-on into the left-rear of Carpenter's car, causing Dana's car to split in half and lift about six feet in the air before landing upright. After the crash, it was reported that Carpenter was briefly knocked unconscious but was awake and alert, and that Dana had suffered serious leg injuries. The session had also been delayed, and instead ended at 11:00 AM local time. Both drivers were assisted out of their cars and airlifted to Jackson Memorial Hospital, where Dana was pronounced dead shortly before noon. Carpenter was listed in stable condition and remained in the hospital for further evaluation.

The announcement of Dana's death was made by Indy Racing League president Brian Barnhart at 12:45 PM local time. It was the first death for the IRL since Tony Renna's passing following a test session crash at the Indianapolis Motor Speedway in October 2003. Out of respect for Dana, Bobby Rahal announced that Rahal Letterman Racing would withdraw all three of their entries, which were to be driven by Rice, Dana, and Patrick. Rahal also clarified that there was no miscommunication regarding Dana and his spotter, and Barnhardt reasoned that the circumstances of the situation is what led to Dana's crash: "That's just the first time of the weekend that we got all 20 cars on the track at the same time. Ed had his problem in turn two initially. The yellow lights were called immediately and all systems functioned properly. It's just a busy time out there with a lot of cars and a lot of traffic." Dana's now-widow, Tonya Bergeson-Dana, learned of his death while preparing for mass in Indianapolis, Indiana. Prior to Dana's death, she was planning to tell him that she was pregnant with their first child. While IRL officials and drivers considered postponing or cancelling the race, they eventually decided to instead begin the race as scheduled after consulting with then-track president Curtis Gray.

== Race ==
The race began at 3:45 PM local time on Sunday, March 26, 2006. It was broadcast live on ABC, with Marty Reid serving as the play-by-play commentator and Wallace and Scott Goodyear serving as race analysts. During the pre-race invocation, a moment of silence was held for Dana. Several drivers, such as Dixon, Wheldon, Hornish Jr., and Castroneves raced with decals honoring Dana. With sunny conditions and an ambient temperature of 77 °F (25 °C), Miami Dolphins defensive end Jason Taylor commanded drivers to start their engines and fifteen of the sixteen remaining drivers rolled off the starting grid. Herta was the lone exception, as he relayed to his team that he had no fuel pressure. His car was pushed to his pit stall. Once the green flag was waved to signify the start of the race, pole sitter Hornish Jr. jumped to an early lead over teammate Castroneves. Andretti was penalized on the first lap for driving below the white line before the start of the race, resulting in a drive-through penalty. The first yellow flag of the race was issued on the tenth lap, when Meira's car began trailing smoke. He retired from the race. During pit stop cycles, Andretti reported a broken drive shaft and exited his car, becoming the second retiree. More problems arose when Lazier's car caught on fire as he left pit road. He became the race's third retiree. Castroneves was mired back to sixth position on the restart on lap 21, as he was one of the few leaders who entered pit road; Wheldon subsequently took over the second position. Five laps later, Herta finally joined the race after his team fixed his fuel pressure issue.

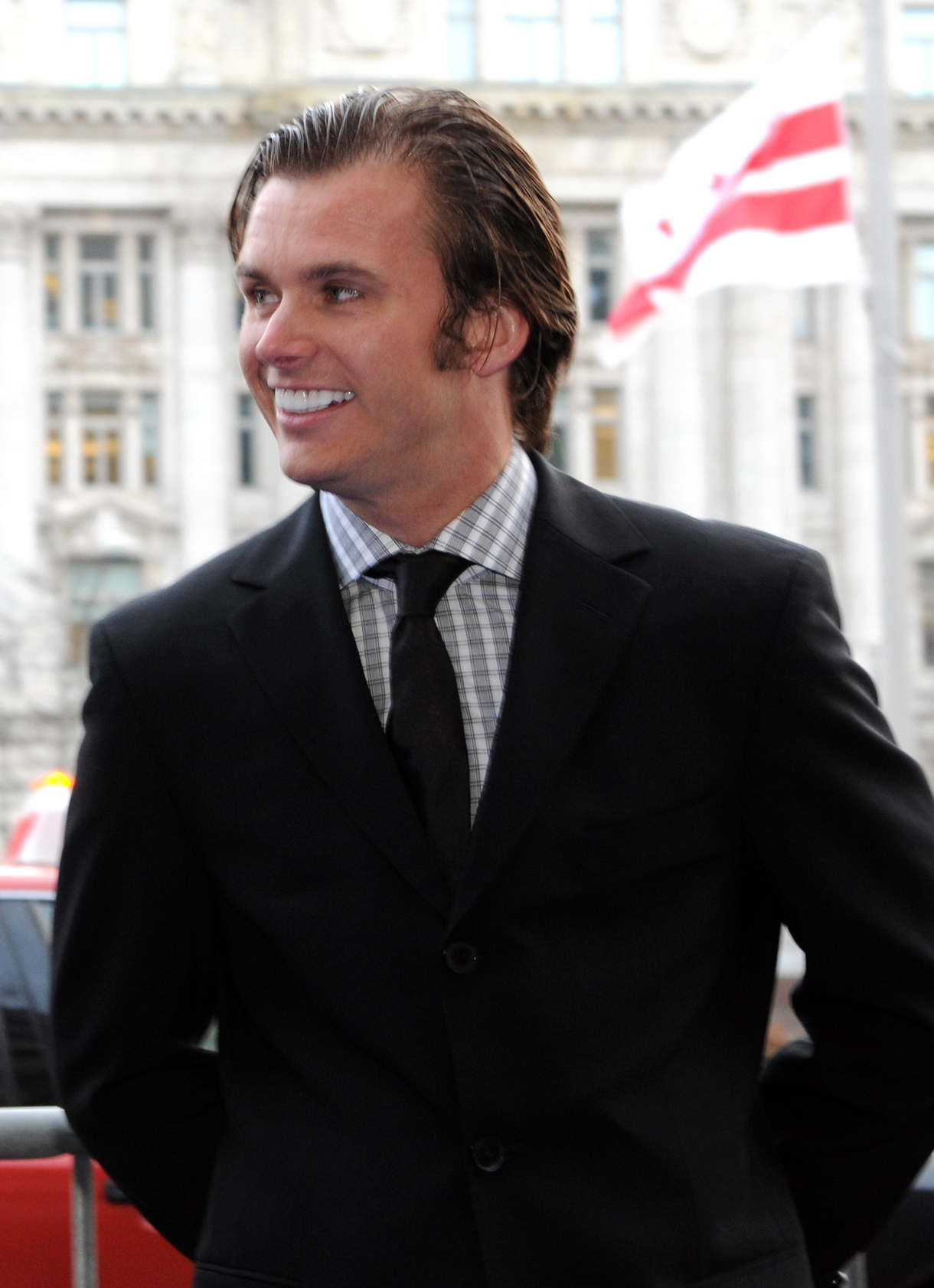
Dan Wheldon (pictured in 2010) won the race in a photo finish.

Hornish Jr. continued his steady pace, leading the first 57 laps and gradually extending his lead to 2.2924 seconds over Wheldon in the largely uneventful race thus far. He finally gave up the lead to Castroneves on lap 58 as the first round of green-flag pit stop cycles commenced. Castroneves entered pit road nine laps later, and Sharp inherited the lead for two laps until he pitted on lap 69. Hornish Jr. was finally shifted back to the race lead after Matsuura pitted on lap 72. Hornish Jr. resumed his dominance of the race and was over five seconds ahead of Wheldon when the second caution was flown for debris in turn four. Every driver entered pit road, and Hornish Jr. maintained the lead by exiting first, while Wheldon lost a handful positions because of a front wing adjustment. Hornish Jr. led another large chunk of laps and was about two tenths of a second ahead of teammate Castroneves when he pitted at the end of lap 160 for four tires and fuel. Meanwhile, Kanaan, who had raced within the lead pack the entire day, had simultaneously attempted to enter pit road behind Hornish Jr. when his car veered left and hit the inside pit wall, effectively ending Kanaan's race. Chesson's car also stalled as he exited pit road, which ended his race as well.

Castroneves assumed control of the field once again, as he exited pit road first on lap 164. Unfortunately for Hornish Jr., he was placed one lap behind Castroneves due to the caution, though he earned his lap back because he was ahead of Castroneves at the moment of caution. He still faced adversity, though, as he was the last car on the lead lap and was stuck behind three lapped cars. The caution was also poorly timed for Wheldon, who entered pit road right after it had closed. Wheldon was consequently given a drive-through penalty. On the ensuing restart on lap 170, the fourth caution was flown when Herta collided with another driver in turn one, sending Herta crashing into the outside barrier. He was uninjured, but his race was over. The green flag was issued once again on lap 178, and Wheldon promptly completed overtakes on Dixon in turn four and Franchitti in turn one the following lap, giving him the second position. Wheldon then used Castroneves' draft to his advantage and drove alongside him in an intense battle for the lead with less than twenty laps to go. Wheldon led his first lap of the race on lap 183 and marginally expanded his lead over Castroneves to just over two hundredths of a second two laps later. The two drivers continued their fierce battle until lap 190, when Castroneves finally cleared Wheldon for the lead. Despite his lead, Castroneves mightily struggled to break Wheldon's draft in the final ten laps, as the widest margin between him and Wheldon during this period was 0.0932 seconds. On the final lap, Wheldon pounced to the lead over Castroneves on the backstretch and ran inches apart from him in the final two corners. Ultimately, Wheldon gained just enough momentum on the final corner to win the race by 0.0147 seconds over Castroneves, the ninth-closest finish in IRL history (at the time).

The victory marked Wheldon's tenth win of his IndyCar career, his first of the season, and his second consecutive win at Homestead. Castroneves finished second, and Hornish Jr., who led the most laps (145), finished third. Franchitti and Dixon rounded out the top five, and Matsuura, Sharp, Giaffone, Scheckter, and Cheever rounded out the top ten. They were also the last of the classified finishers.

=== Post-race ===
Despite the exciting victory, Wheldon remained humble during victory lane celebrations and offered his prayers to the Dana family: "This was a very sad day. I think, hopefully, we put on a good race, which I think we did. The IndyCar Series never fails to do that. It is certainly a very entertaining series and certainly one of the most competitive series in the world. Just a very, very sad day." He earned $109,800 in race winnings. Second-place finisher Castroneves spoke on his thoughts during the last few laps: "My fans over there are really trying. 2004 Sam won on the inside lane and he won. This year, I said, 'No way I'm going to give up the inside lane,' and Dan did a hell of a job. Obviously today, you have to remember a big loss, which is a pity. All my thoughts are with Paul Dana's family." He also revealed how he and his colleagues managed to build up the courage to race after Dana's death: "Well, definitely it's hard to lose a colleague, a person that is doing the same job that you're doing. But all the drivers here know the risk. We all know the danger of the sport. We are here because we love what we do. It's tougher for those that stay here."

Several other drivers also paid tribute to Dana after the race. Hornish Jr. said: "We don't want to see anybody get hurt. It's a tough situation to be in, but the decision to race was made even before we knew the severity of the accident. We all saw it on TV and knew it was bad, but none of us knew the extent of it until the decision had already been made. We all knew what we needed to do was go out there and race." Franchitti said: "I'm still in shock about the whole thing. I didn't know Paul very well, but I've been through this before. I just feel for his family. It's such a tragedy." Giaffone said: "I did think about him during the race. I do believe that when your time is up, that is it. God has a plan for everyone, and there's nothing you can do about it. God bless his family during this terrible time."

Indy car racing legends Johnny Rutherford and A. J. Foyt also voiced their opinions on the tragedy. Rutherford said: "It’s a very sad situation, and we used to have a lot of that – a couple of them a month in sprint cars and midgets. It’s gotten a lot safer and you start getting a long stretch where nobody is injured and you get lulled into a false sense of security. Then, bang, it hits you again." Foyt added: "You’ll think of it afterward and hate it, but you have a job to do and have to put it out of your mind. I know it sounds cold, but that’s the business we’re in." David Letterman, co-owner of Rahal Letterman Racing, offered his condolences to Dana's family during an episode of his talk show, Late Show with David Letterman, which aired the day after Dana's death: "It's not hard to imagine the despair and sorrow that Paul Dana's wife, Tanya, and the rest of his family are feeling now. I want them to know that they have the thoughts and the prayers of myself, the entire Rahal-Letterman team, and the entire racing community and, hopefully, that will give them the slightest amount of comfort."

Carpenter was released from the hospital on Monday, March 27, and issued this statement: "It was a bad day for racing and my prayers and thoughts go out to Paul's family. I was fortunate to be able to speak with Paul's brother during my stay at the hospital and I was glad for that. I wish I could have spoken with his wife as well, but I want her to know that my sincerest sympathies and prayers are with her, their family and the entire Rahal Letterman Racing team at this time." He was diagnosed with bruised lungs and sat out the next race at St. Petersburg, with veteran driver Roberto Moreno serving as Carpenter's fill-in driver that weekend. A memorial service for Dana was held at the Mahaffey Theater on Thursday, March 30, prior to the weekend's festivities for the race at St. Petersburg.

The finishing order of the race placed Wheldon as the leader of the Drivers' Championship with 50 points. Castroneves earned 40 points and was second, while Hornish Jr. was third with 38 points. Franchitti and Dixon rounded out the top five.

=== Race classification ===
Pos	No.	Driver	Team	Chassis	Laps	Time/Retired	Grid	Laps Led	Pts.
1	10	(United Kingdom) Dan Wheldon W	Target Chip Ganassi Racing	Dallara	200	01:46:14.5286	6	8	50
2	3	(Brazil) Hélio Castroneves	Marlboro Team Penske	Dallara	200	+0.0147	2	42	40
3	6	(United States) Sam Hornish Jr. W	Marlboro Team Penske	Dallara	200	+0.4744	1	145	38^{2}
4	27	(United Kingdom) Dario Franchitti	Andretti Green Racing	Dallara	200	+0.9401	5	0	32
5	9	(New Zealand) Scott Dixon W	Target Chip Ganassi Racing	Dallara	200	+1.1989	3	0	30
6	55	(Japan) Kosuke Matsuura	Super Aguri Fernández Racing	Dallara	198	+2 Laps	10	3	28
7	8	(United States) Scott Sharp	Delphi Fernández Racing	Dallara	198	+2 Laps	11	2	26
8	14	(Brazil) Felipe Giaffone	A. J. Foyt Racing	Dallara	198	+2 Laps	7	0	24
9	2	(South Africa) Tomas Scheckter	Vision Racing	Dallara	197	+3 Laps	9	0	22
10	51	(United States) Eddie Cheever	Cheever Racing	Dallara	196	+4 Laps	12	0	20
11	11	(Brazil) Tony Kanaan	Andretti Green Racing	Dallara	159	Accident	4	0	19
12	91	(United States) P. J. Chesson R	Hemelgarn Racing	Dallara	152	Gearbox	16	0	18
13	7	(United States) Bryan Herta	Andretti Green Racing	Dallara	140	Accident	8	0	17
14	5	(United States) Buddy Lazier	Dreyer & Reinbold Racing	Dallara	12	Electrical	14	0	16
15	26	(United States) Marco Andretti R	Andretti Green Racing	Dallara	12	Half Shaft	13	0	15
16	4	(Brazil) Vítor Meira	Panther Racing	Dallara	10	Engine	15	0	14
17	16	(United States) Danica Patrick	Rahal Letterman Racing	Panoz	0	Did Not Start	17	0	7
18	15	(United States) Buddy Rice	Rahal Letterman Racing	Panoz	0	Did Not Start	18	0	6
19	17	(United States) Paul Dana R	Rahal Letterman Racing	Panoz	0	Did Not Start	19	0	6
20	20	(United States) Ed Carpenter	Vision Racing	Dallara	0	Did Not Start	20	0	6
Fastest lap: (New Zealand) Scott Dixon (Target Chip Ganassi Racing) - 24.7198 (lap 195)
Official race results

Notes

- ^2 — Includes three bonus points for leading the most laps.

== Championship standings after the race ==
Drivers' Championship standings

	Pos.	Driver	Points
Unchanged	1	(United Kingdom) Dan Wheldon	50
Unchanged	2	(Brazil) Hélio Castroneves	40 (–10)
Unchanged	3	(United States) Sam Hornish Jr.	38 (–12)
Unchanged	4	(United Kingdom) Dario Franchitti	32 (–18)
Unchanged	5	(New Zealand) Scott Dixon	30 (–20)

- Note: Only the top five positions are included.

Previous race: 2005 Toyota Indy 400	IndyCar Series; 2006 season	Next race: 2006 Honda Grand Prix of St. Petersburg
Previous race: 2005 Toyota Indy 300	Toyota Indy 300	Next race: 2007 XM Satellite Radio 300
