= 2006 Honda Grand Prix of St. Petersburg =

IndyCar race held in St. Petersburg, Florida

(United States) 2006 Honda Grand Prix of St. Petersburg
Race details
- 2nd round of the 2006 IndyCar season
- Layout of the Streets of St. Petersburg circuit
- Date: April 2, 2006
- Official name: Honda Grand Prix of St. Petersburg
- Location: St. Petersburg Street Circuit, St. Petersburg, Florida, United States
- Course: Temporary street circuit 1.800 mi / 2.897 km
- Distance: 100 laps 180.000 mi / 289.682 km
- Weather: 82 °F (28 °C), sunny

Pole position
- Driver: (United Kingdom) Dario Franchitti (Andretti Green Racing)
- Time: 1:02.2753

Fastest lap
- Driver: (Brazil) Tony Kanaan (Andretti Green Racing)
- Time: 1:03.5842 (on lap 71 of 100)

Podium
- First: (Brazil) Hélio Castroneves (Team Penske)
- Second: (New Zealand) Scott Dixon (Chip Ganassi Racing)
- Third: (Brazil) Tony Kanaan (Andretti Green Racing)

Chronology
Previous	Next
2005	2007

The 2006 Honda Grand Prix of St. Petersburg was an IRL IndyCar Series open-wheel race that was held on April 2, 2006, on a temporary street circuit in St. Petersburg, Florida. It was the second round of the 2006 IRL IndyCar Series and the third running of the event. Hélio Castroneves, driving for Team Penske, won the 100-lap race. Chip Ganassi Racing driver Scott Dixon finished second, and Tony Kanaan came in third for Andretti Green Racing.

Dario Franchitti won the pole position and led the first fourteen laps, but retired early due to mechanical issues. Dixon inherited the lead and held onto it for 26 of the next 28 laps until an issue with the front wing slightly slowed his performance. Throughout the second half of the race, Castroneves was a dominant factor, leading a race-high 40 laps. Dixon was looking to challenge Castroneves for the win after his final pit stop, but a caution with less than five laps to go ruined his strategy and handed the victory to Castroneves, the eighth of his IndyCar Series career. There were eight lead changes amongst five different drivers, and two cautions which slowed the race for eleven laps.

Due to the win, Castroneves also took the Drivers' Championship lead, while Dan Wheldon, who crashed under caution, fell to third. Dixon also improved to second.

== Background ==
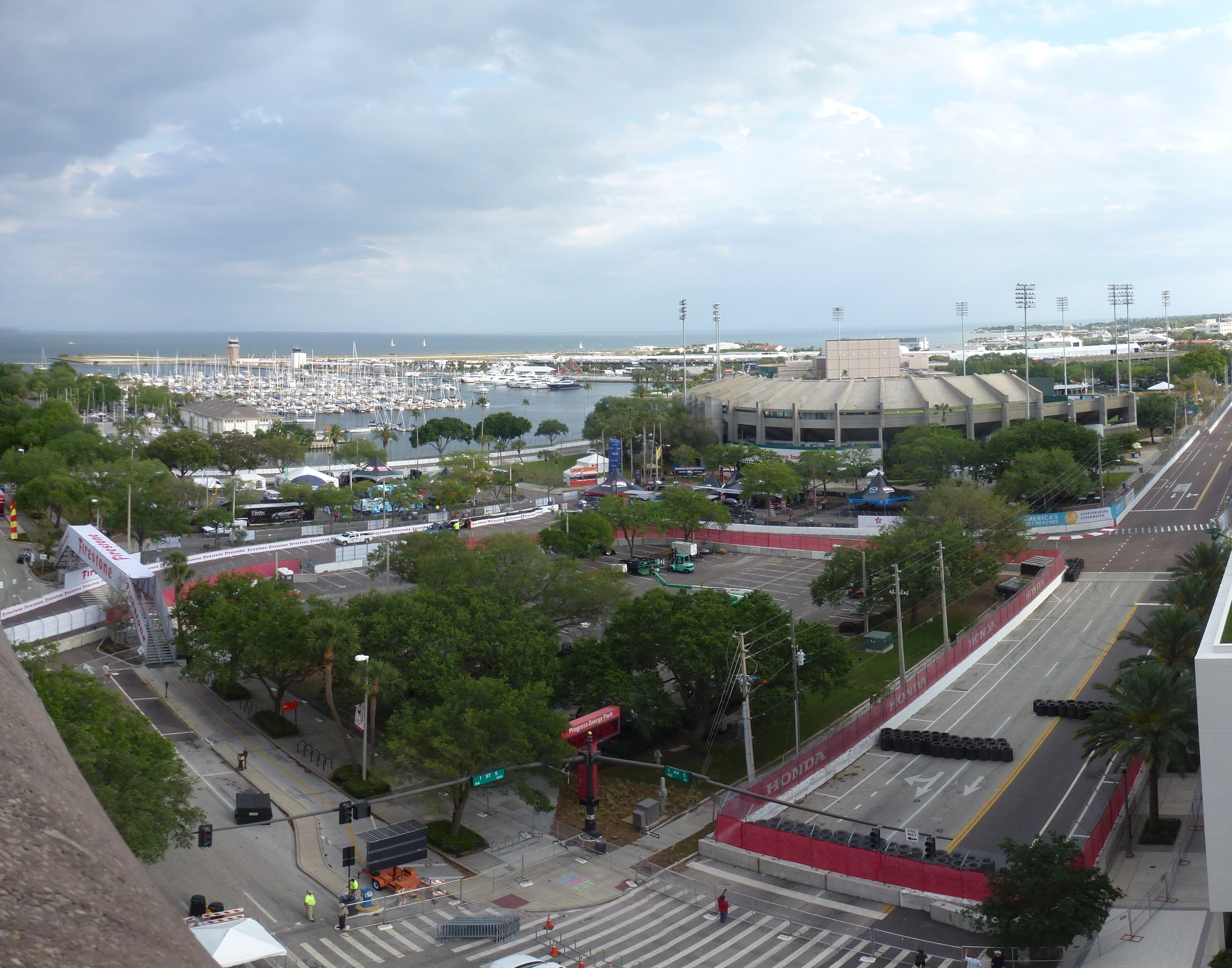
The St. Petersburg Street Circuit (pictured in 2012), where the race was held.

The Honda Grand Prix of St. Petersburg was confirmed to be on the Indy Racing League (IRL)'s 2006 schedule in September 2005. It was the second of 14 scheduled races for 2006, the third edition of the event (dating back to 2003), and the only street circuit race of the season. It took place on Sunday, April 2, 2006, in St. Petersburg, Florida, United States, on a 1.8 mi (2.9 km), fourteen-turn street circuit, and was contested over 100 laps and 180 miles (290 kilometres). Dan Wheldon was the defending race winner. Heading into the event, Wheldon obtained the Drivers' Championship lead with 50 points, ahead of Hélio Castroneves with 40 points and Sam Hornish Jr. with 38 points. Dario Franchitti and Scott Dixon rounded out the top five, with 32 and 30 points, respectively.

Two days after the series' previous round at Homestead–Miami Speedway, the drivers took to the track's 2.21 mi (3.56 km) road course configuration for an open testing session. Castroneves lapped the quickest time of 1 minute and 10.5399 seconds, ahead of teammate Hornish Jr., Bryan Herta, Tony Kanaan, and Marco Andretti. Interestingly, veteran road course driver Roberto Moreno drove the No. 20 entry for Vision Racing during the session, as Ed Carpenter was not cleared to race at St. Petersburg. He was fifteenth quickest in the session. Later that day, Vision Racing announced that Moreno would fill in for Carpenter in the race, marking his first start in American open-wheel racing since 2003.

IndyCar Series drivers and teams continued mourning Paul Dana, who died on the morning of March 26 following a crash during the warmup session at Homestead. A memorial service was held at the Mahaffey Theater on Thursday, March 30, to celebrate the life of Dana, who was described as passionate and tenacious by Rahal Letterman Racing spokesman Tom Blatter. Dana's teammates, Buddy Rice and Danica Patrick, called Dana a nice person who was ecstatic following his qualifying result at Homestead. While Patrick admitted that she was surprised to learn of Dana's signing, she and Rice defended Dana from his critics and insisted that he belonged in the IndyCar Series. Out of respect for Dana and his family, Rahal Letterman Racing had withdrawn their No. 17 entry for the race at St. Petersburg. They planned to announce a replacement driver in the near future.

== Practice and qualifying ==
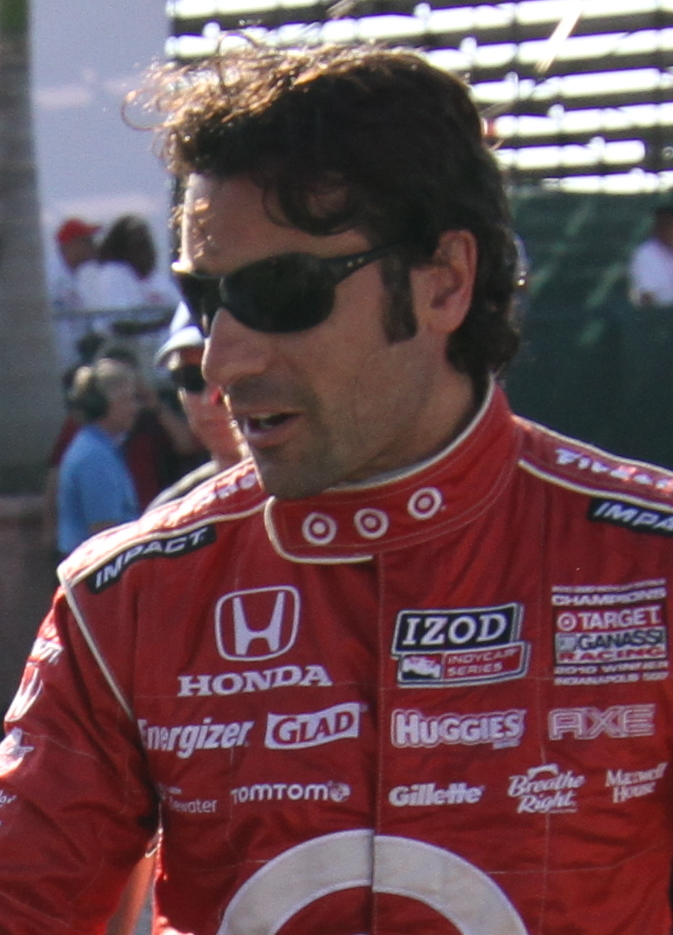
Dario Franchitti (pictured in 2011) broke the track record and won the pole position.

Three practice sessions preceded the race on Sunday; the first two sessions were held on Friday, and the final session was held on Saturday. Unlike the oval races, practice played a crucial part in determining the starting grid on road course events. All entries were permitted to put down laps during the initial 120-minute session on Friday morning, which would determine the two groups for the next two pre-qualifying sessions, both of which were split into 30 minutes for each group. The driver with the fastest overall lap on Friday would decide whether the single-lap qualifying order will proceed with the fastest driver first and the slowest driver last, or invert the qualifying order.

The first practice session on Friday morning was led by Dixon, who set a time of 1 minute and 2.9515 seconds. Castroneves, Franchitti, Kanaan, and Hornish Jr. were second through fifth. The only red flag of the session was issued twenty minutes after it began, when Moreno's car lost power on the thirteenth turn. Franchitti went on to set the fastest lap of the second session and the overall day, with a time of 1 minute and 2.7967 seconds. Dixon was second, Kanaan third, Rice fourth, and Kosuke Matsuura fifth. As a result, Franchitti was given the responsibility to decide the qualifying order on Saturday. During this practice session, Eddie Cheever and Andretti collided in turn four, causing Andretti's car to go airborne for a brief moment and crash into the tire barriers. Hornish Jr. would also crash into the tire barriers almost an hour later in turn eight. None of the drivers were injured. Franchitti continued showcasing his speed during the final practice session on Saturday morning, setting the fastest time of the weekend thus far at 1 minute and 2.1850 seconds, ahead of Castroneves, Dixon, Kanaan, and Herta. P. J. Chesson crashed into the barriers in turn six, and was able to drive back to pit road. Tomas Scheckter later made contact with the turn twelve barriers and spun in the next corner. He and Chesson were both uninjured in their separate crashes.

Qualifying was held on Saturday at 1:45 PM local time, and lasted for 90 minutes. All nineteen drivers were required to make one lap in their qualifying attempt. The fastest six drivers in the first round would advance to the next round, named the "Firestone Fast Six", which was a ten-minute, European-style session that determined the first three rows of the starting grid. The first round of qualifying was run without incident, and Franchitti, the last car in the qualifying order, set the fastest lap of the round with a time of 1 minute and 2.5314 seconds. He and Kanaan, Hornish Jr., Dixon, Castroneves, and Herta set the six fastest laps and advanced to the Firestone Fast Six. Under ambient temperatures of 82 °F (28 °C), Franchitti scored the pole position for the third time in his IndyCar Series career and broke the track record set by Herta the year prior with a time of 1 minute and 2.2753 seconds. It was also Franchitti's first pole position at a non-oval track circuit. Dixon started alongside Franchitti in second, and Kanaan, Hornish Jr., and Castroneves took the third, fourth, and fifth starting posiions, respectively. Herta, Rice, Scheckter, Matsuura, and Andretti rounded out the top ten, and Moreno, Vítor Meira, Wheldon, Patrick, Scott Sharp, Felipe Giaffone, Cheever, and Chesson filled out the rest of the starting grid.

=== Qualifying classification ===
Key	Meaning
R	Rookie
W	Past winner

Pos	No.	Driver	Team	Chassis	R1 Time	R2 Time	Final grid
1	27	(United Kingdom) Dario Franchitti	Andretti Green Racing	Dallara	1:02.5314	1:02.2753	1
2	9	(New Zealand) Scott Dixon	Target Chip Ganassi Racing	Panoz	1:02.7747	1:02.5951	2
3	11	(Brazil) Tony Kanaan	Andretti Green Racing	Dallara	1:02.6778	1:02.6127	3
4	6	(United States) Sam Hornish Jr.	Marlboro Team Penske	Dallara	1:02.7310	1:02.6758	4
5	3	(Brazil) Hélio Castroneves	Marlboro Team Penske	Dallara	1:02.8056	1:02.7482	5
6	7	(United States) Bryan Herta	Andretti Green Racing	Dallara	1:03.1694	1:02.8774	6
7	15	(United States) Buddy Rice	Rahal Letterman Racing	Panoz	1:03.5648	—	7
8	2	(South Africa) Tomas Scheckter	Vision Racing	Dallara	1:03.7143	—	8
9	55	(Japan) Kosuke Matsuura	Super Aguri Fernández Racing	Dallara	1:03.8033	—	9
10	26	(United States) Marco Andretti R	Andretti Green Racing	Dallara	1:03.8853	—	10
11	20	(Brazil) Roberto Moreno	Vision Racing	Dallara	1:03.9455	—	11
12	4	(Brazil) Vítor Meira	Panther Racing	Dallara	1:04.0206	—	12
13	10	(United Kingdom) Dan Wheldon W	Target Chip Ganassi Racing	Panoz	1:04.0267	—	13
14	16	(United States) Danica Patrick	Rahal Letterman Racing	Panoz	1:04.4436	—	14
15	8	(United States) Scott Sharp	Delphi Fernández Racing	Dallara	1:04.8588	—	15
16	14	(Brazil) Felipe Giaffone	A. J. Foyt Racing	Dallara	1:05.3845	—	16
17	51	(United States) Eddie Cheever	Cheever Racing	Dallara	1:05.5475	—	17
18	5	(United States) Buddy Lazier	Dreyer & Reinbold Racing	Dallara	1:06.2425	—	18
19	91	(United States) P. J. Chesson R	Hemelgarn Racing	Dallara	1:08.8266	—	19
Official qualifying results

== Warm-up ==
The drivers took to the track at 10:15 AM local time on Sunday for a 30-minute warm-up session. Franchitti continued his near flawless weekend by setting the fast time at 1 minute and 3.6419 seconds, ahead of Wheldon, Dixon, Kanaan, and Castroneves. However, Franchitti experienced his first setback of the weekend with nine minutes remaining when he crashed into the tire barriers in turn eight after Matsuura had already crashed at the same spot. After the crash, Franchitti's team replaced the broken piece of his car, while Matsuura's team was able to repair his broken suspension, sidepod, and undertray.

== Race ==
The race was held on Sunday, April 2, at 3:45 PM local time. Television coverage of the race began at 3:30 PM local time on ESPN, with Marty Reid serving as the play-by-play commentator and Rusty Wallace and Scott Goodyear serving as race analysts. Race conditions were dry and relatively hot, with air temperatures reaching a peak of 82.4 °F (28.0 °C). Gene Simmons gave the command for drivers to start their engines, and all nineteen cars rolled off of pit road to begin the race. Most of the grid maintained their starting positions in the opening laps of the race, with the exception of Rice, who passed Herta for sixth. Wheldon, who qualified a disappointing 13th, was climbing his way up through the field when on lap 7, he made contact with the right-front wheel of Andretti's car in turn two, which nearly sent Wheldon spinning. He recovered, though he lost some positions.

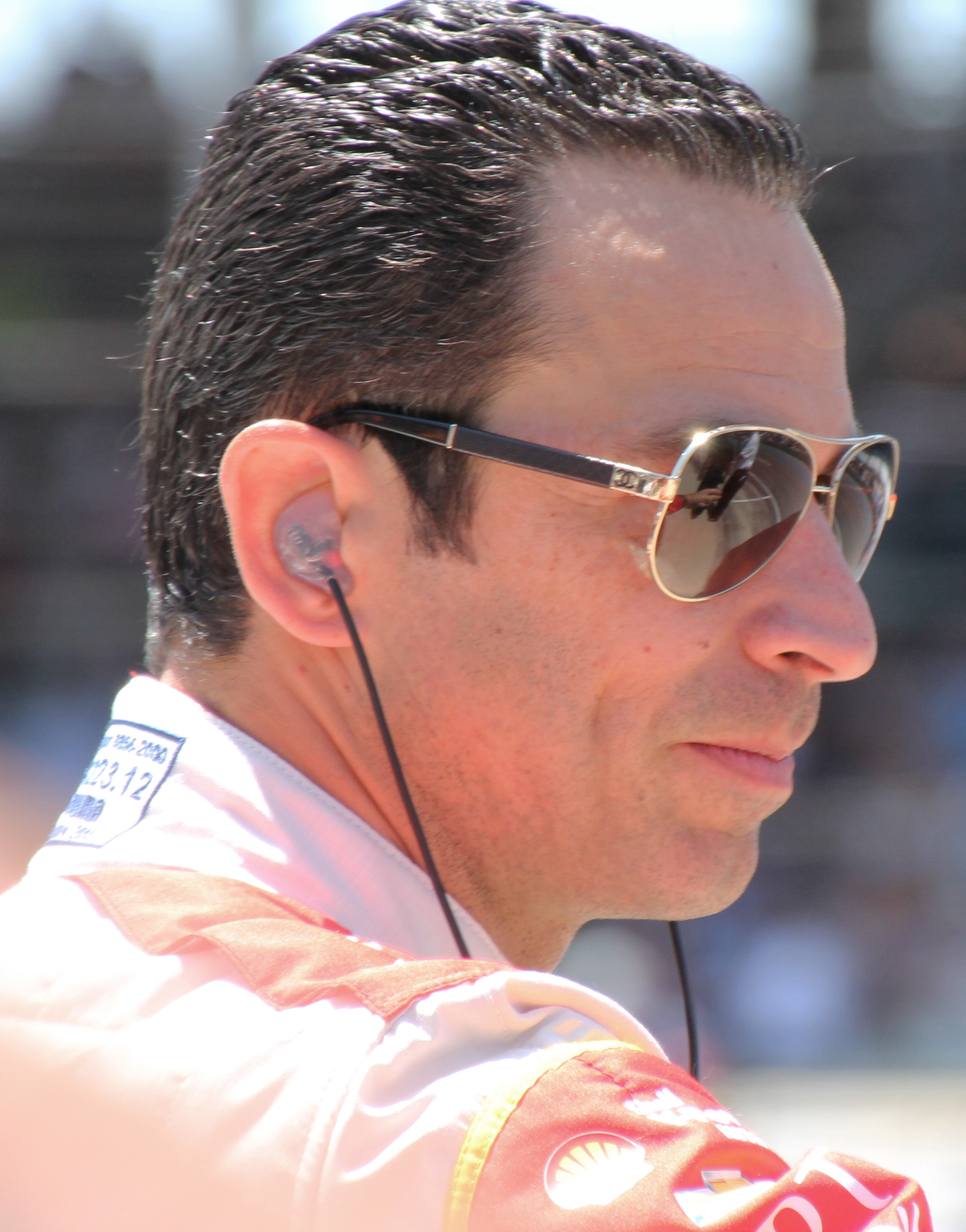
Hélio Castroneves (pictured in 2015) won the race with a well-timed pit strategy.

On the 15th lap, problems arose for Franchitti, who had led every single lap up to this point when he reported damage to the right side of his suspension and slowed down in turn five to allow the other drivers to pass by him. Franchitti was forced to retire from the race due to these issues, becoming the race's first retiree. Franchitti later said that he first noticed the problem on the fifth lap, but he persevered for the next ten laps. Wheldon simultaneously entered pit road for new tires due to his contact with Andretti. Dixon, who was running in the second position, capitalized on Franchitti's misfortune and maintained a three-second lead over Kanaan. While no cautions were issued throughout the first half of the race, a close call occurred in the final corner on lap 28, when Moreno's front nose made contact with Meira's right-rear tire. Moreno pitted five laps later with a damaged suspension and retired from the race. Green-flag pit stops began on lap 33 when Kanaan entered pit road for four tires and fuel. Dixon pitted three laps later and was one of the last drivers to pit. After Hornish Jr. led two laps, he entered pit road and gave up the lead to Dixon, who rejoined the track in the second position. However, Dixon began experiencing issues with his front wing, which was rubbing against his left-front tire. Castroneves would soon take advantage of the situation and overtake Dixon for the lead on lap 45. Kanaan remained third, not far behind the two leaders.

Castroneves experienced minor troubles getting by slower cars, such as Giaffone and Sharp, but held onto the race lead ahead of Dixon and Kanaan. The first caution was issued on lap 53 when Chesson locked up the brakes and stalled in turn ten. Chesson subsequently retired from the race. As most of the leaders entered pit road, Castroneves gave up the race lead to Rice, who stayed out, while Wheldon improved his position from tenth to fourth (of the drivers who pitted). Wheldon exited pit road ahead of Hornish Jr. but paced behind him on the track, and IndyCar chief steward Brian Barnhart ordered Wheldon ahead of Hornish Jr. As Wheldon attempted to pass Hornish Jr., his car suddenly jerked left and made contact with Wheldon, spinning him out. Wheldon was eventually able to get his car restarted, but he had sustained enough damage to the rear suspension to take him out of the race. Andretti also retired from the race, citing a broken drive shaft as the reason for the second consecutive race. He had been running just outside the top ten prior to the retirement. Three laps after the race's restart on lap 60, Castroneves passed Patrick, Herta, and Rice to retain the first position. Rice and Herta later pitted on lap 69, in hopes of an incident-free finish so that the leaders would be forced to pit one last time. Patrick and Hornish Jr., utilizing the same strategy as Rice and Herta, pitted a handful of laps later in what was their final pit stops of the race. Meanwhile, Castroneves and Dixon, the latter of whom had to persist through issues with his front wing and radio communications, remained in the first and second positions, respectively, and stretched out their fuel as long as they could.

With eighteen laps to go, Hornish Jr. was running solidly in ninth when his car suddenly locked up the brakes entering turn ten. Hornish Jr. luckily slowed his car enough to complete the turn, but he had lost several crucial positions in the process. Unfortunately, Hornish Jr.'s brake issues only intensified in the coming laps, as his car drove into the run-off area in turn four on lap 85. Two laps later, Castroneves entered pit road for the final time for a splash of fuel, giving up the lead to Dixon. With the finish rapidly approaching, Dixon no longer tried to save his fuel and attempted to gain a large enough gap from second position so that he could remain in contention for the win, even after his final pit stop. His strategy was initially successful, as he had gained a 15-second lead over Castroneves by the time he entered pit road for fuel on lap 95. Additionally, when Dixon rejoined the track, he placed himself in between Castroneves (now in first) and Kanaan (in third), meaning that he was in a perfect position to overtake Castroneves for the win. However, Dixon's strategy was ultimately hindered when Rice and Scheckter, who was running in fourth, made contact in turn four, sending Scheckter airborne and into the tire barriers on lap 96. The final four laps of the race were run under caution, and Castroneves was scored as the race's victor. Dixon finished second, and Kanaan third. Herta, Meira, Patrick, Matsuura, Hornish Jr., Giaffone, Sharp, and Cheever took positions three through eleven, and were the last of the classified finishers. Castroneves' win was the eighth of his IndyCar Series career, his first of the season, and his first win on a road course. Prior to this, Castroneves had never even finished an IRL-sanctioned race on a road course.

=== Post-race ===
After the race, Castroneves commenced his usual victory celebration of climbing the catch fence before driving to victory lane. He earned $125,800 in race winnings. Castroneves was happy with the result and described his thoughts leading up to the finish: "Everyone was telling me, ‘Go for it. Go for it.’ I drove it like I stole it. You know, it was awesome. We didn't have many yellows, which made a very intense race probably for three of us. That was fun until I got the lead. I was like, 'OK, you guys better back off.' But they never did." Dixon, who finished second, lamented about his race performance: "The first stint we were consistently quicker, I think. We were running fairly lean. The car was doing good lap times. Once we got to the second set of tires, and about the fourth, fifth lap, it just started to fall off. It got worse and worse over that run. That’s when (Castroneves) started to catch me; I got traffic. I think with a good front wing, we would have been pretty solid. I just couldn’t turn right." Third-place finisher Kanaan was content with his result: "I believe we had a third place car today and we finished third. I think the guys that finished ahead of us deserved to finish where they finished, so I'm pretty happy."

After several years of missteps, the event was considered a success. It marked the first time in over a decade that a motor race was held at St. Petersburg, Florida for two consecutive years. The corporate suites were completely sold out, and grandstands were packed with fans. St. Petersburg Mayor Rick Baker also attended the race, and was bombarded with requests for autographs and pictures. Kanaan also praised the atmosphere of the event and revealed that Hornish Jr., who was primarily successful on oval tracks, told him that "[IndyCar] should have more races like that." Due to the fans' support of the event, the IRL announced on April 1 that the event would return to the series' schedule in 2007.

For the first time since September 2003, Castroneves led the Drivers' Championship as a result of his win; he earned a total of 93 points. Dixon also improved his position in the standings from fifth to second with 70 points. Wheldon gained 64 points and suffered a blow to his position, falling to third due to his poor finish. Hornish Jr. had two less than Wheldon and was placed fourth, while Kanaan climbed six positions in the standings and grabbed fifth with 54 points.

=== Race classification ===
Pos	No.	Driver	Team	Chassis	Laps	Time/Retired	Grid	Laps Led	Pts.
1	3	(Brazil) Hélio Castroneves	Marlboro Team Penske	Dallara	100	01:56:57.5172	5	40	53^{1}
2	9	(New Zealand) Scott Dixon	Target Chip Ganassi Racing	Panoz	100	+0.1386	2	36	40
3	11	(Brazil) Tony Kanaan	Andretti Green Racing	Dallara	100	+0.6284	3	0	35
4	7	(United States) Bryan Herta	Andretti Green Racing	Dallara	100	+0.7813	6	0	32
5	4	(Brazil) Vítor Meira	Panther Racing	Dallara	100	+2.5995	12	0	30
6	16	(United States) Danica Patrick	Rahal Letterman Racing	Panoz	100	+3.0433	14	0	28
7	55	(Japan) Kosuke Matsuura	Super Aguri Fernández Racing	Dallara	100	+52.7172	9	0	26
8	6	(United States) Sam Hornish Jr.	Marlboro Team Penske	Dallara	99	+1 Lap	4	2	24
9	14	(Brazil) Felipe Giaffone	A. J. Foyt Racing	Dallara	99	+1 Lap	16	0	22
10	8	(United States) Scott Sharp	Delphi Fernández Racing	Dallara	99	+1 Lap	15	0	20
11	51	(United States) Eddie Cheever	Cheever Racing	Dallara	99	+1 Lap	17	0	19
12	2	(South Africa) Tomas Scheckter	Vision Racing	Dallara	96	Accident	8	0	18
13	15	(United States) Buddy Rice	Rahal Letterman Racing	Panoz	96	Accident	7	8	17
14	5	(United States) Buddy Lazier	Dreyer & Reinbold Racing	Dallara	59	Handling	18	0	16
15	26	(United States) Marco Andretti R	Andretti Green Racing	Dallara	58	Mechanical	10	0	15
16	10	(United Kingdom) Dan Wheldon W	Chip Ganassi Racing	Panoz	57	Accident	13	0	14
17	91	(United States) P. J. Chesson R	Hemelgarn Racing	Dallara	55	Handling	19	0	13
18	20	(Brazil) Roberto Moreno	Vision Racing	Dallara	32	Handling	11	0	12
19	27	(United Kingdom) Dario Franchitti	Andretti Green Racing	Dallara	15	Handling	1	14	12
Fastest lap: (Brazil) Tony Kanaan (Andretti Green Racing) - 1:03.5842 (lap 71)
Official race results

Notes

- ^1 — Includes three bonus points for leading the most laps.

== Championship standings after the race ==
Drivers' Championship standings

	Pos.	Driver	Points
1	1	(Brazil) Hélio Castroneves	93
3	2	(New Zealand) Scott Dixon	70 (–23)
2	3	(United Kingdom) Dan Wheldon	64 (–29)
1	4	(United States) Sam Hornish Jr.	62 (–31)
6	5	(Brazil) Tony Kanaan	54 (–39)

- Note: Only the top five positions are included.

Previous race: 2006 Toyota Indy 300	IndyCar Series; 2006 season	Next race: 2006 Indy Japan 300
Previous race: 2005 Honda Grand Prix of St. Petersburg	Grand Prix of St. Petersburg	Next race: 2007 Honda Grand Prix of St. Petersburg
