= Paul Dana =

American racing driver (1975–2006)

- Born: Paul Frederick Dana; April 15, 1975 St. Louis, Missouri, U.S.
- Died: March 26, 2006 (aged 30) Homestead, Florida, U.S.

Indy Racing League IndyCar Series
- Years active: 2005–2006
- Teams: Hemelgarn Racing; Rahal Letterman Racing
- Starts: 4
- Wins: 0
- Poles: 0
- Fastest laps: 0
- Best finish: 27th in 2005

Previous series
- 2003–2004 2001 2001: Infiniti Pro Series; United States Formula Three; Formula Ford 2000 USA

Paul Frederick Dana (/ˈdeɪnə/; April 15, 1975 – March 26, 2006) was an American racing driver who competed in the IndyCar Series.

== Early life ==
Born in St. Louis, Missouri, Dana graduated from the Medill School of Journalism at Northwestern University. Before becoming a race driver, he worked as a mechanic, a private racing coach, a driving instructor, and a PR & marketing account representative. He also was an editor and journalist covering motorsport, his writing having appeared in AutoWeek, Sports Illustrated and Maxim.

== Racing career ==
In 1996, Dana was working as a mechanic at the Bridgestone Racing School in Ontario when he won his first races there. In 1998, he moved to Indianapolis and began competing in the Barber Dodge Pro Series, and his top-twenty finish earned him an invitation to the inaugural Formula Dodge National Championship.

Dana then competed in the Infiniti Pro Series where he captured one race win and placed second in the 2004 championship. He then secured sponsorship to run in the IndyCar Series with sponsorship from Ethanol suppliers, which he brought to Hemelgarn Racing.

After competing in three IndyCar Series events, Dana suffered a spinal fracture while practicing for the 2005 Indianapolis 500 and missed the rest of the season, replaced by Jimmy Kite. He returned to the series to race for Rahal Letterman Racing after he recovered from his injuries.

== Death ==
In the practice session for the first race of the 2006 IndyCar Series season, at Homestead-Miami Speedway, Dana collided with Ed Carpenter's disabled car after Carpenter's tire went flat, thrusting Carpenter's car into a retaining wall, before it slid to the bottom of the track. Dana, in the Rahal-Letterman car, was told to "go low" by his spotter. Slow-motion footage showed that Dana had hit debris from Carpenter's car just before impact.

ABC/ESPN's telemetry indicated Dana's car hit Carpenter's car at about 176 mph (283 km/h), while Scott Sharp, who was running alongside Dana, reported that he had slowed to approximately 50 mph (80 km/h) by the time of Dana's impact.

Dana was transported to Jackson Memorial Hospital, where he died due to complications from injuries sustained in the crash. The morning of his death, Dana's wife, Tonya Bergeson, had found out she was expecting their first child.

After his death, Dana's teammates Buddy Rice and Danica Patrick did not compete in the race as a mark of respect for their deceased teammate.

Dana's death raised questions over his qualifications to compete and IndyCar's process to approve inexperienced drivers. Journalist Robin Miller wrote that, "the majority of veterans were wary of Dana's pedigree."

During a show on March 27, 2006, an emotional David Letterman paused during his monologue to offer his condolences to Dana's family:

It's not hard to imagine the despair and sorrow that Paul Dana's wife, Tonya, and the rest of his family are feeling now, and I want them to know that they have the thoughts and the prayers of myself, the entire Rahal-Letterman team, and the entire racing community and, hopefully, that will give them the slightest amount of comfort. I did not know Paul personally but we were all proud to have him on our team and are deeply saddened by his tragic passing at such a young age.

== Racing record ==
=== American open-wheel racing results ===
(key) (Races in bold indicate pole position)

==== Indy Lights ====
Year	Team	1	2	3	4	5	6	7	8	9	10	11	12	Rank	Points	Ref
2003	Kenn Hardley Racing	HMS; 13	PHX; 6	INDY; 7	PPIR; DNS	KAN; 13	NSH; 7	MIS; 10						**9th**	**234**	
2003	Brian Stewart Racing								STL; 7	KTY; 8	CHI; 13	FON; 14	TXS	**9th**	**234**	
2004	Hemelgarn Racing	**HMS**; 8	PHX; 5	INDY; 10	KAN; 2	NSH; 2	MIL; 1	MIS; 4	KTY; 2	PPIR; 2	CHI; 8	FON; 12	TXS; 11	**2nd**	**379**	

==== IndyCar Series ====
Year	Team	No.	1	2	3	4	5	6	7	8	9	10	11	12	13	14	15	16	17	Rank	Points	Ref
2005	Hemelgarn Racing	91	HMS; 10	PHX; 21	STP	MOT; 20	INDY; Wth	TXS	RIR	KAN	NSH	MIL	MIS	KTY	PPIR	SNM	CHI	WGL	FON	**27th**	**44**	
2006	Rahal Letterman Racing	17	HMS; DNS	STP	MOT	INDY	WGL	TXS	RIR	KAN	NSH	MIL	MIS	KTY	SNM	CHI				**40th**	**6**	

NOTE: By IndyCar rule, half points awarded when a team withdraws.

Preceded by Tony Renna	Fatalities in Champ Car/IndyCar; 2006	Succeeded by Dan Wheldon
