= P. J. Chesson =

American race car driver

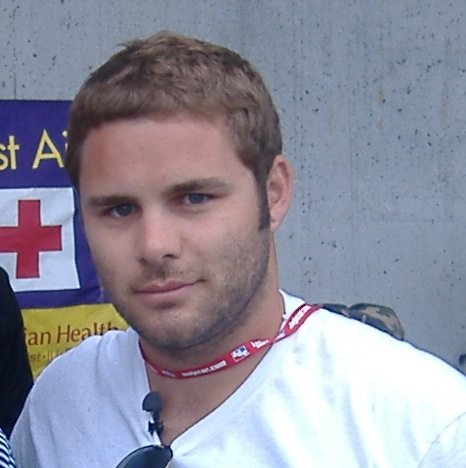
- Chesson at the Indianapolis Motor Speedway in 2007
- Nationality: American
- Born: December 9, 1978 (age 47) Far Hills, New Jersey, U.S.
- Relatives: James Chesson (brother) Timothy Chesson (brother) Elizabeth Chesson (sister)

IRL IndyCar Series
- Years active: 2004-2007
- Teams: Roth Racing; Hemelgarn Racing
- Starts: 5
- Best finish: 22nd in 2006

Previous series
- 2000–2003 2004–2005: World of Outlaws; Indy Pro Series

Peter Lawrence Chesson Jr. (born December 9, 1978) is an American race car driver who most recently competed in the Indy Racing League IndyCar Series.

Chesson was born in Far Hills, New Jersey, and drove go-karts and motorbikes while growing up on a horse farm in Bedminster, New Jersey.

== Career ==
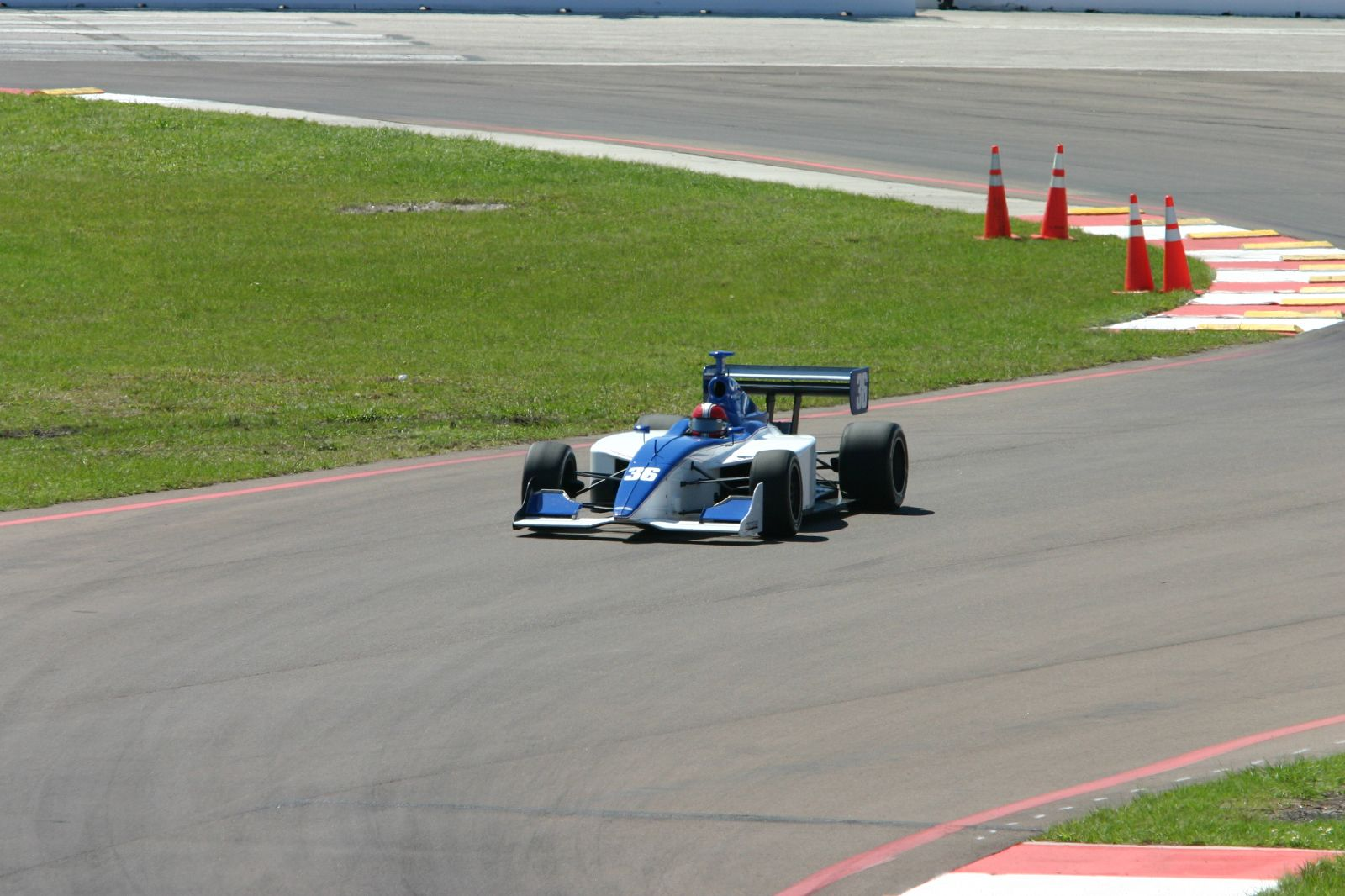
P. J. driving in IPS on the Streets of St. Petersburg in 2005

Chesson made his professional debut in sprint cars in 1998 and from 2000 to 2003 was a regular in the World of Outlaws winged sprint car series.

In 2004, Chesson suddenly decided to change his career path and drove in the IRL's Infiniti Pro Series winning three races and finishing fourth in series points despite missing three races.

Chesson was announced as the driver for Hemelgarn Racing's car in the IndyCar Series in 2006 with new backing from NBA star Carmelo Anthony. The partnership was dubbed "Carmelo Hemelgarn Racing". The deal was brokered through the IRL's new marketing partner, Simmons-Abramson Marketing, made up of rock legend Gene Simmons and entertainment industry vet Richard Abramson. Chesson started the first four races of the season, the last being the Indianapolis 500, where he and teammate Jeff Bucknum tangled on the second lap and finished in the last two positions. Chesson has numerous tattoos, including one of the 2006 Indianapolis 500 logo that he had applied in public at the Speedway during the final day of qualifying.

Since the demise of his deal with Hemelgarn, Chesson did not return to the Indycar Series until the end of the 2007 season when, in another Simmons/Abramson brokered deal, Chesson was announced as the second driver for Roth Racing alongside team owner Marty Roth with both cars sponsored by fashion label Dussault Apparel. He made his 2007 debut at the final race of the season at Chicagoland Speedway and finished nineteenth after mechanical gremlins sidelined him for over one-hundred laps.

== Racing record ==
=== American open–wheel racing results ===
(key) (Races in bold indicate pole position)

==== Indy Pro Series ====
Year	Team	1	2	3	4	5	6	7	8	9	10	11	12	13	14	Rank	Points
2004	Mo Nunn Racing	HMS	PHX	INDY	KAN; 8	NSH; 6	MIL; 2	MIS; 1	KTY; 1	PPIR; 1	CHI; 5	FON; 2	TXS; 5			**4th**	**317**
2005	Genoa Racing	HMS; 11	PHX; 14	STP; 7	INDY	TXS	IMS	NSH	MIL	KTY	PPIR	SNM	CHI	WGL	FON	**17th**	**61**

==== IndyCar ====
Year	Team	1	2	3	4	5	6	7	8	9	10	11	12	13	14	15	16	17	Rank	Points	Ref
2006	Hemelgarn Racing	HMS; 12	STP; 17	MOT; 17	INDY; 33	WGL	TXS	RIR	KAN	NSH	MIL	MIS	KTY	SNM	CHI				22nd	54	
2007	Roth Racing	HMS	STP	MOT	KAN	INDY	MIL	TXS	IOW	RIR	WGL	NSH	MDO	MIS	KTY	SNM	DET	CHI; 19	29th	12	

==== Indianapolis 500 ====
Year	Chassis	Engine	Start	Finish	Team
2006	Dallara	Honda	20	33	Hemelgarn
