= Hemelgarn Racing =

American auto racing team

(United States) Hemelgarn Racing
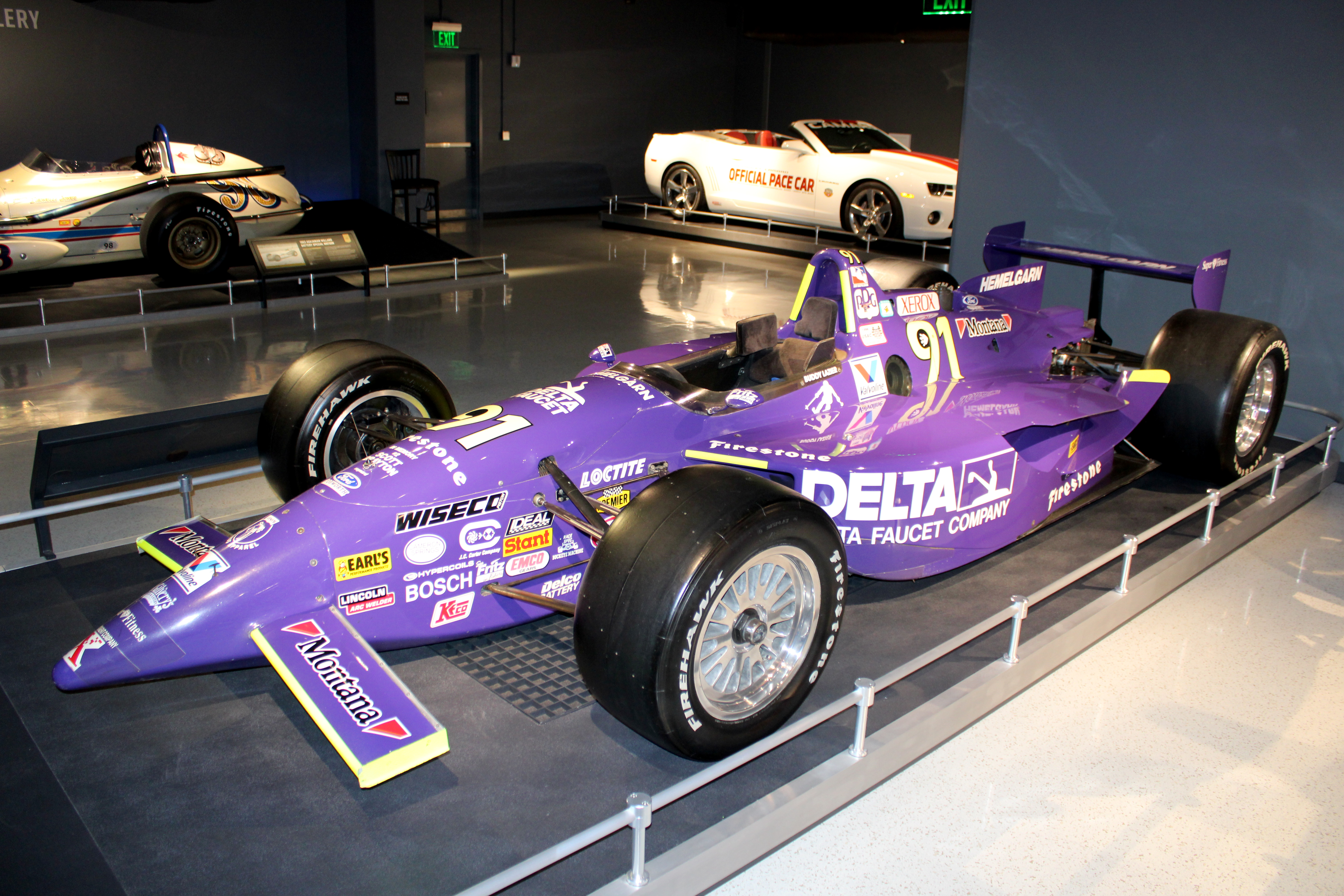
- Founded: 1985; 41 years ago
- Team principal(s): Ron Hemelgarn; Lee Kunzman
- Current series: USAC Silver Crown Series
- Former series: CART, IndyCar
- Noted drivers: Arie Luyendyk; Stan Fox; Buddy Lazier
- Drivers' Championships: 2000 IRL; 2020 USAC Silver Crown

Hemelgarn Racing was an American auto racing team owned by Ron Hemelgarn. The team debuted in 1985, and competed in the CART and Indy Racing League ranks until the team originally shut down in 2010. The team returned to competition in 2015, and currently competes full-time in the USAC Silver Crown Series with driver Justin Grant. Grant won the 2020 championship for the team.

The team won the 1996 Indianapolis 500 and 2000 Indy Racing League Championship with driver Buddy Lazier.

The team had a best finish of 7th in the CART standings. Along with Lazier's Indy 500 win in 1996, the team also had two second-place finishes at the Indy 500 in 1998 and 2000.

Along with A. J. Foyt Enterprises, Hemelgarn was unique in having competed in at least one race in every season of the Indy Racing League's existence from 1996 through 2008.

== CART series history ==
=== Early years ===
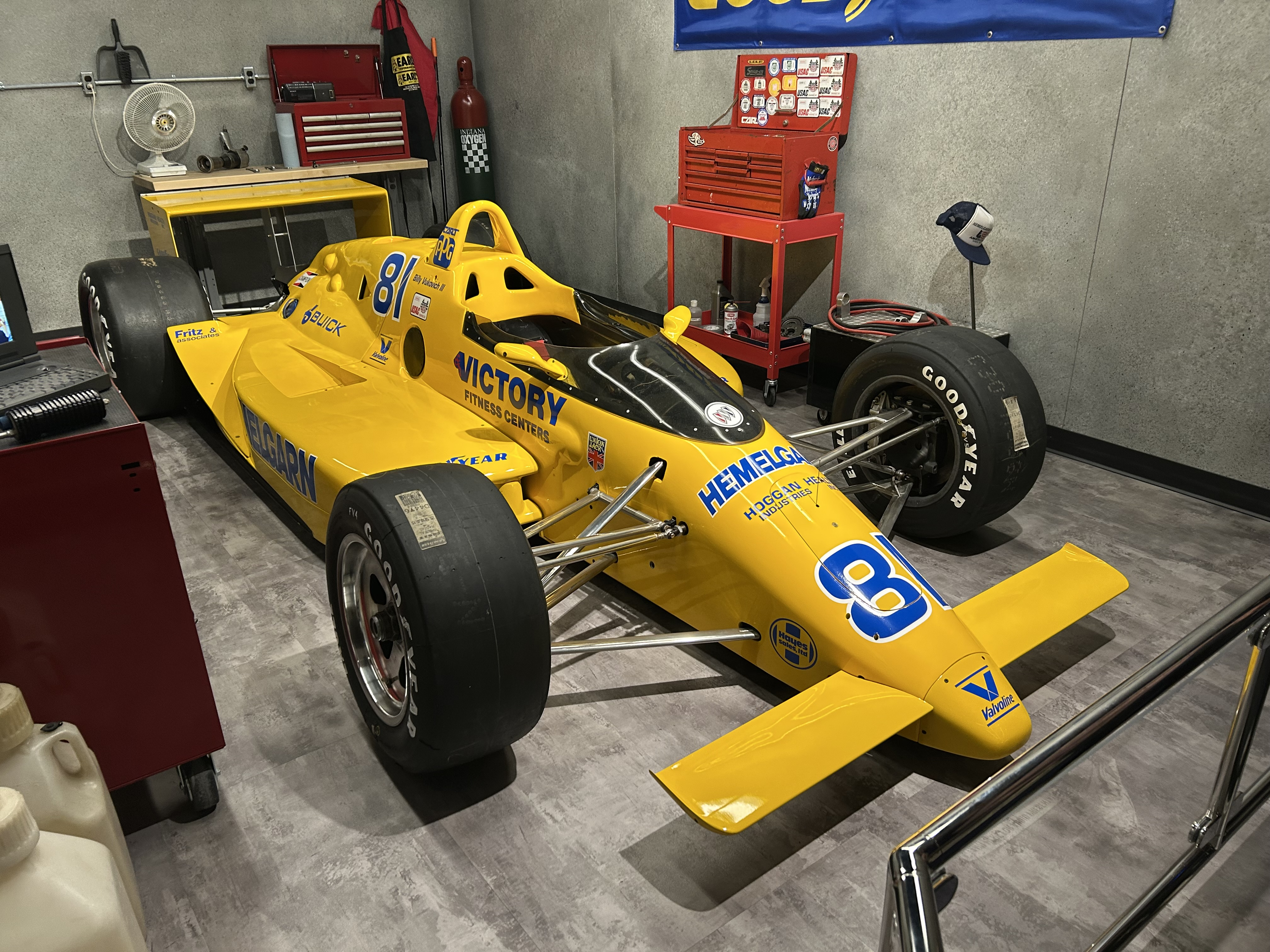
Hemelgarn Racing's 1990 Indianapolis 500 entry piloted by Billy Vukovich III

The team was founded in 1985 and participated part-time in the CART series with largely outdated equipment and three different drivers. In 1986 the team bought new March chassis and participated full-time with Jacques Villeneuve and part-time with Scott Brayton, putting both in the field of the team's first Indianapolis 500.

Arie Luyendyk replaced Villeneuve for 1987 and finished 7th in points. In 1988 Scott Brayton raced full-time for the team while three other drivers fielded part-time entries. For 1989, seven different drivers took turns behind the wheel, as the team struggled to find consistency. Buddy Lazier first joined the team in 1990 and competed in his first six CART races with the team. Lazier was bumped from the field and failed to qualify for the Indianapolis 500, while Billy Vukovich III did qualify his Hemelgarn machine for the 1990 Indy 500, finishing 24th in a two-year-old Lola-Buick.

=== 1991 ===
Hemelgarn teamed up with Dale Coyne Racing to field a car at Road America and Toronto for Lazier in 1991. The team fielded three cars at the 1991 Indianapolis 500. Indy legend Gordon Johncock, veteran Stan Fox, and Buddy Lazier, who made the race for the first time. Lazier was involved in a spin on the first lap and finished last. Johncock, however, charged from 33rd starting position, and battling an illness, came home in a surprising 6th place. Fox in 8th place gave the team two cars in the top ten.

=== 1992–1995 ===
In 1992 the team only participated at Indianapolis as costs to run the series full-time increased rapidly. In 1993 the team fielded a car for pay driver Brian Bonner in a pair of road races.

For 1994 and 1995, Hemelgarn ran Indianapolis only, with veteran Stan Fox as the primary driver. Jeff Andretti (1994) and Jim Crawford (1995), respectively, were entered as second drivers, but neither were able to qualify. Fox was running in the top ten late in the race in 1994, but spun out and crashed in turn one with four laps to go. In 1995 Fox qualified 11th, but was involved in a terrible crash at the start. He was critically injured, suffering a closed-head injury, which ended his driving career.

== Indy Racing League success ==
=== 1996–2001 ===
With the founding of the Indy Racing League in 1996, the team was eager to return to full-time racing and re-signed former Hemelgarn stalwart Buddy Lazier to pilot their full-time entry and fielded additional cars for Brad Murphey and Stéphan Grégoire in the Indy 500.

Buddy Lazier scored the team's first pole position at the 1996 IRL season opener at Walt Disney World Speedway.

Lazier scored the first win of his Indy car career and Hemelgarn's first as a team in a gutsy drive while recovering from a back injury in the 1996 Indianapolis 500. This win cemented Lazier and sponsor Delta Faucet with the team for years to come. Lazier was one of the top drivers in the league, consistently scoring top-tens and finishing in the top-ten in points every year.

In 2000, Lazier and Hemelgarn captured the Indy Racing League championship and finished second in the Indy 500 behind the dominant "500" rookie Juan Pablo Montoya. The team nearly repeated their championship ways in 2001, with Lazier capturing four wins and finishing second in points, albeit well back from champion Sam Hornish Jr.

With Lazier behind the wheel, Hemelgarn posted eight wins, and 18 top three finishes over six seasons.

== Struggles and closure ==
=== 2002–2005 ===
As 2002 came, the team began to struggle. The influx of former CART teams had begun and Lazier only managed an 8th-place finish in points and only registered a pair of top five finishes. 2003 was even worse as the team struggled with under-powered Chevrolet engines compared to the new Honda and Toyota powerplants and Lazier finished a dismal 19th in series points, prompting Delta Faucets to leave the team.

In 2004 the team was only able to field a car for Lazier in the Indy 500. In 2005 the team returned to full-time competition with new ethanol sponsorship brought by driver Paul Dana who was injured after three races and replaced by Jimmy Kite.

=== 2006 ===
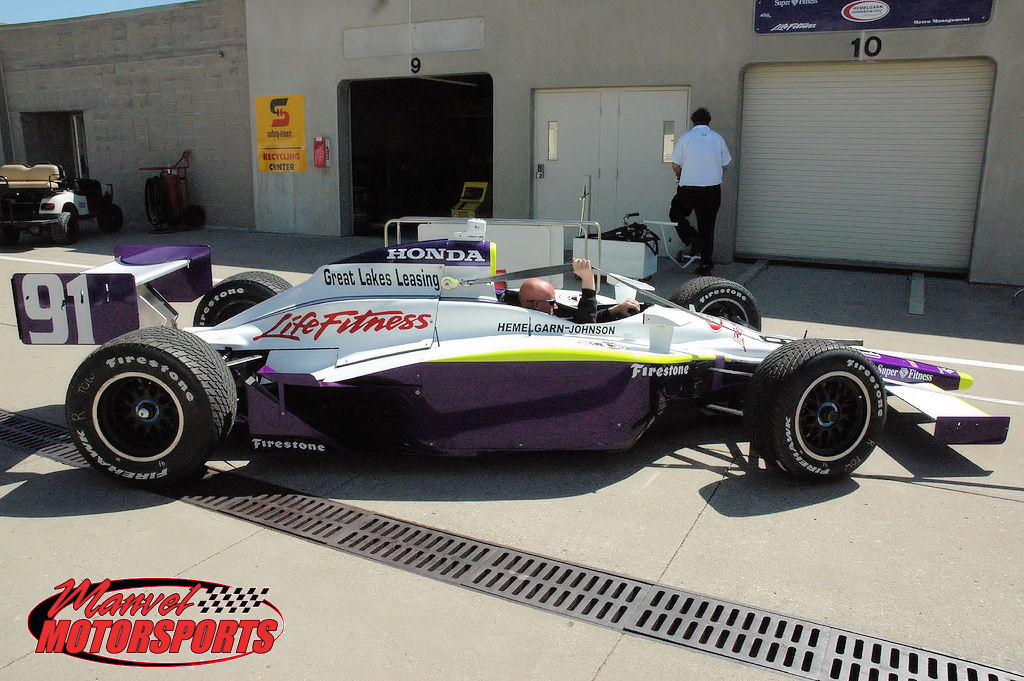
Hemelgarn's 2008 Indy 500 entry for Buddy Lazier

The team hit rock bottom in 2006. The team was able to broker a deal with driver P. J. Chesson, with financial backing from NBA star Carmelo Anthony. Jeff Bucknum joined the team as a second team car, and under the moniker "Car-Melo", the two cars qualified for the 2006 Indianapolis 500. On the second lap, however, the two cars tangled in turn two and crashed out together, finishing 32nd and 33rd (last and second-to-last). Following the devastating result, Ron Hemelgarn let his crew go and suspended the team's operations, leaving Chesson without a ride for the rest of the year.

=== 2007–2009 ===
It was unknown if and when Hemelgarn Racing would return to the track until the team filed an entry for the 2007 Indianapolis 500. Little was heard of the entry until a deal was put together on the Friday before the final weekend of qualifying with Racing Professionals to jointly field a former Hemelgarn chassis (bought by RP) for Richie Hearn. Hearn solidly put the car in the field after only 26 laps of practice on Bump Day and finished the race in the 23rd position.

In 2008 Buddy Lazier returned to the team for the Indianapolis 500 and made a last minute run on Bump Day to put the car into the field. With little practice, Lazier struggled with the handling of the car and finished 17th five laps down. The team attempted to repeat 2008's relative success in 2009, but despite running lap times similar to what they had run the previous year, Lazier was not able to wring enough speed from the car to make the field.

In April 2010, SPEED TV's Robin Miller reported that Hemelgarn Racing had ceased operations. Ron Hemelgarn was inducted into the Michigan Motorsports Hall of Fame (www.mmshof.org) in 2013.

== Return (2015–present) ==
The team reopened at the start of 2015, and began competing full-time in the USAC Silver Crown Series. Austin Nemire raced for the team in 2015 and 2016. Nemire had two top 5s (Iowa – 2015 and Gateway – 2016), and finished 8th in points standings during both seasons.

Hemelgarn joined forces with Chris Carli Motorsports & driver Justin Grant for the 2017 season. The combination had success as they finished 4th in the points standings & won the Bettenhausen 100 at Illinois State Fairgrounds.

Grant returned to the team for the 2018 season and won at Terre Haute Action Track. Grant won the 2020 championship without winning a race that season.

== List of Hemelgarn drivers ==
=== CART ===
- (United States) Brian Bonner 1993
- (United States) Scott Brayton 1986–1989
- (United States) Stan Fox 1991–1995
- (United States) Spike Gehlhausen 1985
- (Canada) Scott Goodyear 1989–1990
- (United States) Davey Hamilton 1991; 1995
- (Canada) Ludwig Heimrath 1988–1989
- (United States) Gordon Johncock 1988–1989; 1991–1992
- (United States) Ken Johnson 1988
- (United States) Buddy Lazier 1990–1991; 1994
- (Netherlands) Arie Luyendyk 1987
- (Argentina) Enrique Mansilla 1985
- (Finland) Tero Palmroth 1989
- (Republic of Ireland) Michael Roe 1985
- (United States) Dick Simon (sponsored car) 1978–1979
- (United States) Tom Sneva 1988–1989
- (Belgium) Didier Theys 1989
- (United States) Robby Unser 1989
- (Canada) Jacques Villeneuve 1986
- (United States) Rich Vogler 1987
- (United States) Billy Vukovich III 1989–1990

=== IndyCar / Indy Racing League ===
- (United States) Jeff Bucknum 2006
- (United States) P. J. Chesson 2006
- (United States) Paul Dana 2005
- (France) Stephan Gregoire 1996
- (United States) Richie Hearn 2003, 2007
- (United States) Jimmy Kite 2005
- (United States) Buddy Lazier 1996–2003; 2008
- (United States) Chris Menninga 2001
- (United States) Brad Murphey 1996–1997
- (United States) Lyn St. James 1997
- (United States) Johnny Unser 1997–1999
- (United States) Stan Wattles 2000–2001

=== USAC Silver Crown Series ===
- (United States) Justin Grant 2017–present
- (United States) Austin Nemire 2015–2016

== Complete Racing Results ==
=== Complete PPG CART Indycar World Series results ===
(key)

| Year | Chassis | Engine | Drivers | No. | 1 | 2 | 3 | 4 | 5 | 6 | 7 | 8 | 9 | 10 | 11 | 12 | 13 | 14 | 15 | 16 | 17 | Pts Pos | Pos |
Longhorn Racing
| 1979 | | | | | PHX | ATL | | INDY | TRT | | MCH | | WGL | TRT | ONT | MCH | ATL | PHX | | | | | |
| 1979 | Penske PC-6/7 | Cosworth DFX | (United States) Tom Bagley | 11 | 8 | 8 | 7 | 9 | 8 | 4 | 6 | 6 | 6 | 7 | 32 | 5 | | 9 | | | | 8th | **1,208** |
| 1979 | Penske PC-6/7 | Cosworth DFX | (United States) Steve Krisiloff | 71 | | | | | | | | | | | 23 | | | | | | | 19th | **279** |
| 1980 | | | | | ONT | INDY | MIL | POC | MDO | MCH | WGL | MIL | ONT | MCH | MXC | PHX | | | | | | | |
| 1980 | Longhorn LR-01 | Cosworth DFX | (United States) Al Unser | 5 | 16 | 27 | 20 | 24 | **13** | 7 | **19** | 13 | 4 | 5 | 3 | 15 | | | | | | 8th | **1,153** |
| 1981 | | | | | PHX | MIL | ATL | | MCH | RIV | MIL | MCH | WGL | MXC | PHX | | | | | | | | |
| 1981 | Longhorn LR-02 | Cosworth DFX | (United States) Al Unser | 8 | 17 | 5 | 6 | 7 | 11 | 14 | 5 | 3 | 14 | 2 | 22 | | | | | | | 10th | **90** |
| 1982 | | | | | PHX | ATL | MIL | CLE | MCH | MIL | POC | RIV | ROA | MCH | PHX | | | | | | | | |
| 1982 | Longhorn LR-03/B | Cosworth DFX | (United States) Al Unser | 10 | 21 | 8 | 17 | 3 | 4 | DNQ | 23 | 17 | 2 | 18 | | | | | | | | 7th | **125** |
Primus Motor Sports
| 1983 | | | | | ATL | INDY | MIL | CLE | MCH | ROA | POC | RIV | MDO | MCH | CPL | LAG | PHX | | | | | | |
| 1983 | Longhorn LR-03 | Cosworth DFX | (United States) Chris Kneifel **(R)** | 72 | | 12 | | 27 | 9 | 26 | 8 | 22 | 13 | 24 | 8 | 9 | 15 | | | | | 17th | **19** |
| 1984 | | | | | LBH | PHX | INDY | MIL | POR | MEA | CLE | MCH | ROA | POC | MDO | SAN | MCH | PHX | LAG | CPL | | | |
| 1984 | Primus 84 | Cosworth DFX | (United States) Chris Kneifel | 72 | DNQ | 9 | 15 | 23 | 8 | DNQ | 15 | DNS | 25 | | | | | | | | | 29th | **9** |
| 1984 | Primus 84 | Cosworth DFX | (United States) John Paul Jr. | 72 | | | | | | | | | | 17 | | | | | | | | 17th | **28** |
Hemelgarn Racing
| 1985 | | | | | LBH | INDY | MIL | POR | MEA | CLE | MCH | ROA | POC | MDO | SAN | MCH | LAG | PHX | MIA | | | | |
| 1985 | Lola T900 | Cosworth DFX | (Republic of Ireland) Michael Roe **(R)** | 71 | 21 | DNQ | | 7 | 8 | 26 | | | | | | | | | | | | 27th | **11** |
| 1985 | Lola T900 | Cosworth DFX | (United States) Spike Gehlhausen | 71 | | | 14 | | | | 18 | | | | | | | | | | | 42nd | **0** |
| 1985 | Lola T900 | Cosworth DFX | (Argentina) Enrique Mansilla | 71 | | | | | | | | 9 | | 10 | 12 | | | | | | | 31st | **8** |
| 1985 | Lola T900 | Cosworth DFX | (United States) Scott Brayton | 71 | | | | | | | | | | | | | 26 | 18 | DNQ | | | 22nd | **15** |
| 1986 | | | | | PHX | LBH | INDY | MIL | POR | MEA | CLE | TOR | MCH | POC | MDO | SAN | MCH | ROA | LAG | PHX | MIA | | |
| 1986 | March 86C | Cosworth DFX | (United States) Scott Brayton | 71 | 24 | | | | | | | | 13 | 27 | | | 19 | | | | | 39th | **0** |
| 1986 | March 86C | Buick 3300 V6 tc | (United States) Scott Brayton | 71 | | | 30 | | | | | | | | | | | | | | | 39th | **0** |
| 1986 | March 86C | Cosworth DFX | (Canada) Jacques Villeneuve Sr. | 71 | | 8 | | 15 | 5 | 5 | 19 | 24 | | | 11 | 19 | | 10 | 19 | 16 | 6 | 15th | **38** |
| 1986 | March 86C | Cosworth DFX | (Canada) Jacques Villeneuve Sr. | 81 | | | 20 | | | | | | | | | | | | | | | 15th | **38** |
| 1987 | | | | | LBH | PHX | INDY | MIL | POR | MEA | CLE | TOR | MCH | POC | ROA | MDO | NAZ | LAG | MIA | | | | |
| 1987 | March 87C | Cosworth DFX | (Netherlands) Arie Luyendyk | 71 | 14 | 3 | 18 | 4 | 16 | 6 | 19 | 7 | 5 | 4 | 4 | 11 | 4 | 6 | 11 | | | 7th | **98** |
| 1987 | March 87C | Cosworth DFX | (United States) Rich Vogler | 81 | | | 20 | | | | | | | | | | | | | | | 43rd | **0** |
| 1987 | March 86C | Buick 330 V6 tc | (United States) Rich Vogler | 81 | | | DNQ | | | | | | | | | | | | | | | 43rd | **0** |
| 1987 | March 86C | Buick 330 V6 tc | (United States) Johnny Parsons | 81 | | | DNQ | | | | | | | | | | | | | | | NC | — |
| 1987 | March 87C | Cosworth DFX | (United States) Scott Brayton | 91 | | | 12 | | 5 | 10 | | | 22 | 25 | | | | | | | | 22nd | **14** |
| 1988 | | | | | PHX | LBH | INDY | MIL | POR | CLE | TOR | MEA | MCH | POC | MDO | ROA | NAZ | LAG | MIA | | | | |
| 1988 | Lola T88/00 | Cosworth DFX | (Canada) Ludwig Heimrath | 71 | | 14 | 25 | | 23 | 26 | 19 | 12 | | | | | | | 7 | | | 28th | **7** |
| 1988 | Lola T88/00 | Judd AV | (Canada) Ludwig Heimrath | 71 | | | | | | | | | | | 19 | 21 | | | | | | 28th | **7** |
| 1988 | Lola T88/00 | Cosworth DFX | (United States) Ken Johnson **(R)** | 71 | | | | | | | | | | | | | | 12 | | | | 36th | **1** |
| 1988 | Lola T88/00 | Cosworth DFX | (United States) Tom Sneva | 71 | | | | | | | | | 22 | | | | | | | | | 45th | **0** |
| 1988 | Lola T88/00 | Judd AV | (United States) Tom Sneva | 81 | | | 27 | | | | | | | | | | | | | | | 45th | **0** |
| 1988 | Lola T88/00 | Cosworth DFX | (United States) Gordon Johncock | 71 | | | | | | | | | | 6 | | | | | | | | 21st | **16** |
| 1988 | Lola T88/00 | Cosworth DFX | (United States) Gordon Johncock | 85 | | | | | | | | | 6 | | | | | | | | | 21st | **16** |
| 1988 | Lola T88/00 | Judd AV | (United States) Scott Brayton | 91 | 15 | 23 | | 10 | 9 | 16 | 14 | 11 | 26 | 10 | | | | | 24 | | | 23rd | **12** |
| 1988 | Lola T88/00 | Cosworth DFX | (United States) Scott Brayton | 91 | | | | | | | | | | | | | 18 | | | | | 23rd | **12** |
| 1988 | Lola T88/00 | Buick 3300 V6 tc | (United States) Scott Brayton | 91 | | | 31 | | | | | | | | | | | | | | | 23rd | **12** |
| 1989 | | | | | PHX | LBH | INDY | MIL | DET | POR | CLE | MEA | TOR | MCH | POC | MDO | ROA | NAZ | LAG | | | | |
| 1989 | Lola T89/00 | Judd AV | (Canada) Ludwig Heimrath | 71 | | 24 | | DNS | | | | | | DNQ | | | | 17 | DNQ | | | 26th | **4** |
| 1989 | Lola T88/00 | Judd AV | (Canada) Ludwig Heimrath | 71 | 9 | | 13 | | | | | | 22 | | | 25 | 17 | | | | | 26th | **4** |
| 1989 | Lola T88/00 | Judd AV | (Finland) Tero Palmroth | 71 | | | | | 27 | | | | | | | | | | | | | 43rd | **0** |
| 1989 | Lola T88/00 | Judd AV | (United States) Billy Vukovich III | 81 | | | 12 | | | | | | | | | | | | | | | 34th | **1** |
| 1989 | Lola T88/00 | Buick 3300 V6 tc | (United States) Gordon Johncock | 91 | | | 31 | | | | | | | | | | | | | | | 40 | **0** |
| 1989 | Lola T89/00 | Judd AV | (United States) Gordon Johncock | 91 | | | | | | | | | | 21 | 15 | | | | | | | 40 | **0** |
| 1989 | Lola T89/00 | Judd AV | (Belgium) Didier Theys | 91 | | | | | 9 | | 12 | | | | | | | | | | | 21st | **9** |
| 1989 | Lola T88/00 | Judd AV | (Belgium) Didier Theys | 91 | | | | | | 20 | | 26 | | | | | | | | | | 21st | **9** |
| 1989 | Lola T88/00 | Judd AV | (Canada) Scott Goodyear | 91 | | | | | | | | | 23 | | | | | | | | | 48th | **0** |
| 1989 | Lola T89/00 | Judd AV | (Canada) Scott Goodyear | 91 | | | | | | | | | | | | | 23 | | | | | 48th | **0** |
| 1990 | | | | | PHX | LBH | INDY | MIL | DET | POR | CLE | MEA | TOR | MCH | DEN | VAN | MDO | ROA | NAZ | LAG | | | |
| 1990 | Lola T88/00 | Buick 3300 V6 tc | (United States) Billy Vukovich III | 81 | | | 24 | | | | | | | | | | | | | | | 34th | **0** |
| 1990 | Lola T88/00 | Cosworth DFS | (United States) Billy Vukovich III | 81 | | | | | | | | | | 13 | | | | | | | | 34th | **0** |
| 1990 | Lola T88/00 | Cosworth DFS | (United States) Buddy Lazier **(R)** | 91 | | | DNQ | | | | | | | | | | | | | | | 30th | **1** |
| 1990 | Lola T88/00 | Judd AV | (United States) Buddy Lazier **(R)** | 91 | | | DNQ | | | | | | | | | | | | | | | 30th | **1** |
| 1990 | Lola T88/00 | Buick 3300 V6 tc | (United States) Buddy Lazier **(R)** | 91 | | | DNQ | | DNQ | 13 | 24 | | DNS | 26 | DNQ | 12 | 23 | DNS | 14 | | | 30th | **1** |
| 1991 | | | | | SFR | LBH | PHX | INDY | MIL | DET | POR | CLE | MEA | TOR | MCH | DEN | VAN | MDO | ROA | NAZ | LAG | | |
| 1991 | Lola T90/00 | Buick 3300 V6 tc | (United States) Buddy Lazier | 71 | | | | 33 | | | | | | | | | | | | | | 22nd | **6** |
| 1991 | Lola T88/00 | Buick 3300 V6 tc | (United States) Davey Hamilton | 81 | | | | DNQ | | | | | | | | | | | | | | NC | — |
| 1991 | Lola T91/00 | Buick 3300 V6 tc | (United States) Stan Fox | 91 | | | | 8 | | | | | | | | | | | | | | 24th | **5** |
| 1991 | Lola T90/00 | Cosworth DFS | (United States) Gordon Johncock | 92 | | | | 6 | | | | | | | | | | | | | | 20th | **8** |
| 1992 | | | | | SFR | PHX | LBH | INDY | DET | POR | MIL | NHA | TOR | MCH | CLE | ROA | VAN | MDO | NAZ | LAG | | | |
| 1992 | Lola T91/00 | Buick 3300 V6 tc | (United States) Pancho Carter | 81 | | | | DNQ | | | | | | | | | | | | | | 31st | **2** |
| 1992 | Lola T91/00 | Buick 3300 V6 tc | (United States) Stan Fox | 91 | | | | 27 | | | | | | | | | | | | | | 59th | **0** |
| 1992 | Lola T91/00 | Buick 3300 V6 tc | (United States) Gordon Johncock | 92 | | | | 29 | | | | | | | | | | | | | | 61st | **0** |
| 1993 | | | | | SFR | PHX | LBH | INDY | MIL | DET | POR | CLE | TOR | MCH | NHA | ROA | VAN | MDO | NAZ | LAG | | | |
| 1993 | Lola T91/00 | Buick 3300 V6 tc | (United States) Stan Fox | 91 | | | | 31 | | | | | | | | | | | | | | 54th | **0** |
| 1993 | Lola T92/00 | Buick 3300 V6 tc | (Belgium) Didier Theys | 92 | | | | 22 | | | | | | | | | | | | | | 42nd | **0** |
| 1994 | | | | | SFR | PHX | LBH | INDY | MIL | DET | POR | CLE | TOR | MCH | MDO | NHA | VAN | ROA | NAZ | LAG | | | |
| 1994 | Reynard 94i | Ford XB V8t | (United States) Stan Fox | 91 | | | | 13 | | | | | | | | | | | | | | 37th | **0** |
| 1994 | Lola T92/00 | Buick 3300 V6 tc | (United States) Buddy Lazier | 94 | | | | DNQ | | | | | | | | | | | | | | 36th | **0** |
| 1994 | Lola T92/00 | Buick 3300 V6 tc | (United States) Jeff Andretti | 94 | | | | DNQ | | | | | | | | | | | | | | 44th | **0** |
| 1995 | | | | | MIA | SFR | PHX | LBH | NAZ | INDY | MIL | DET | POR | ROA | TOR | CLE | MCH | MDO | NHA | VAN | LAG | | |
| 1995 | Reynard 95i | Ford XB V8t | (United States) Stan Fox | 91 | | | | | | 30 | | | | | | | | | | | | 46th | **0** |
| 1995 | Reynard 94i | Ford XB V8t | (United States) Davey Hamilton | 95 | | | | | | DNQ | | | | | | | | | | | | NC | — |
| 1995 | Lola T92/00 | Buick 3300 V6 tc | (United Kingdom) Jim Crawford | 96 | | | | | | DNQ | | | | | | | | | | | | NC | — |

=== IRL/IndyCar Series ===
(key) (Results in bold indicate pole position; results in italics indicate fastest lap)

| Year | Chassis | Engine | Drivers | No. | 1 | 2 | 3 | 4 | 5 | 6 | 7 | 8 | 9 | 10 | 11 | 12 | 13 | 14 | 15 | 16 | 17 | 18 | 19 | Pts Pos | Pos |
|---|---|---|---|---|---|---|---|---|---|---|---|---|---|---|---|---|---|---|---|---|---|---|---|---|---|
| 1996 | | | | | WDW | PHX | INDY | | | | | | | | | | | | | | | | | | |
| 1996 | Reynard T95i | Ford XB V8t | (France) Stéphan Grégoire | 9 | 16 | 7 | 27 | | | | | | | | | | | | | | | | | 13th | **165** |
| 1996 | Reynard T94i | Ford XB V8t | (United States) Brad Murphey | 10 | | | 23 | | | | | | | | | | | | | | | | | 34th | **12** |
| 1996 | Reynard T95i | Ford XB V8t | (United States) Buddy Lazier | 91 | **17** | Wth | 1 | | | | | | | | | | | | | | | | | 14th | **159** |
| 1996–97 | | | | | NHA | LSV | WDW | PHX | INDY | TXS | PPIR | CLT | NHA | LSV | | | | | | | | | | | |
| 1996–97 | Reynard T94i | Ford XB V8t | (United States) Brad Murphey | 9 | 18 | 27 | | | | | | | | | | | | | | | | | | 38th | **25** |
| 1996–97 | Dallara IR7 | Infiniti VRH35ADE V8 | (United States) Johnny Unser | 9 | | | | | 18 | | | | | 19 | | | | | | | | | | 24th | **107** |
| 1996–97 | Dallara IR7 | Infiniti VRH35ADE V8 | (United States) Lyn St. James | 90 | | | | | 13 | | | | | | | | | | | | | | | 42nd | **22** |
| 1996–97 | Reynard T95i | Ford XB V8t | (United States) Buddy Lazier | 91 | 19 | 24 | | | | | | | | | | | | | | | | | | 8th | **209** |
| 1996–97 | Dallara IR7 | Infiniti VRH35ADE V8 | (United States) Buddy Lazier | 91 | | | 5 | 21 | | | | | | | | | | | | | | | | 8th | **209** |
| 1996–97 | Dallara IR7 | Oldsmobile Aurora V8 | (United States) Buddy Lazier | 91 | | | | | 4 | 17 | 8 | 1 | 12 | 31 | | | | | | | | | | 8th | **209** |
| 1998 | | | | | WDW | PHX | INDY | TXS | NHA | DOV | CLT | PPIR | ATL | TXS | LSV | | | | | | | | | | |
| 1998 | Dallara IR8 | Oldsmobile Aurora V8 | (United States) Johnny Unser | 9 | | | 25 | | | | | | | | | | | | | | | | | 40th | **5** |
| 1998 | Dallara IR8 | Oldsmobile Aurora V8 | (United States) Buddy Lazier | 91 | 15 | 28 | 2 | 11 | 7 | 2 | 13 | 7 | 17 | 6 | 3 | | | | | | | | | 5th | **262** |
| 1999 | | | | | WDW | PHX | CLT | INDY | TXS | PPIR | ATL | DOV | PPIR | LSV | TXS | | | | | | | | | | |
| 1999 | Dallara IR9 | Oldsmobile Aurora V8 | (United States) Buddy Lazier | 91 | 10 | 18 | C^{1} | 7 | 14 | 5 | 21 | 2 | 4 | 11 | 10 | | | | | | | | | 6th | **224** |
| 1999 | Dallara IR9 | Oldsmobile Aurora V8 | (United States) Johnny Unser | 92 | | | C^{1} | 32 | 15 | 13 | 13 | | | 23 | | | | | | | | | | 27th | **57** |
| 2000 | | | | | WDW | PHX | LSV | INDY | TXS | PPIR | ATL | KTY | TXS | | | | | | | | | | | | |
| 2000 | Riley & Scott Mk VII | Oldsmobile Aurora V8 | (United States) Buddy Lazier | 91 | 2 | 1 | 22 | DNQ | | | | | | | | | | | | | | | | **1st** | **290** |
| 2000 | Dallara IR-00 | Oldsmobile Aurora V8 | (United States) Buddy Lazier | 91 | | | | 2 | **7** | 26 | 2 | 1 | 4 | | | | | | | | | | | **1st** | **290** |
| 2000 | Dallara IR-00 | Oldsmobile Aurora V8 | (United States) Stan Wattles | 92 | | | | 23 | | | | | | | | | | | | | | | | 43rd | **7** |
| 2001 | | | | | PHX | HMS | ATL | INDY | TXS | PPIR | RIR | KAN | NSH | KTY | GAT | CHI | TXS | | | | | | | | |
| 2001 | Dallara IR-01 | Oldsmobile Aurora V8 | (United States) Buddy Lazier | 91 | 3 | 20 | 6 | 18 | 4 | 1 | 1* | 5 | 1 | 1 | 13 | 11 | 17 | | | | | | | **2nd** | **398** |
| 2001 | Dallara IR-01 | Oldsmobile Aurora V8 | (United States) Stan Wattles | 92 | 16 | 26 | 12 | | | | | | | | | | | | | | | | | 32nd | **36** |
| 2001 | Dallara IR-01 | Oldsmobile Aurora V8 | (United States) Stan Wattles | 94 | | | | DNQ | | | | | | | | | | | | | | | | 32nd | **36** |
| 2001 | Dallara IR-01 | Oldsmobile Aurora V8 | (United States) Chris Menninga **(R)** | 92 | | | | | | | | | | | 19 | 16 | 19 | | | | | | | 33rd | **36** |
| 2001 | Dallara IR-01 | Oldsmobile Aurora V8 | (United States) Steve Knapp | 93 | | | | DNQ | | | | | | | | | | | | | | | | NC | — |
| 2002 | | | | | HMS | PHX | FON | NAZ | INDY | TXS | PPIR | RIR | KAN | NSH | MCH | KTY | GAT | CHI | TXS | | | | | | |
| 2002 | Dallara IR-02 | Chevrolet Indy V8 | (United States) Buddy Lazier | 91 | 22 | 7 | 7 | 23 | 15 | 8 | 15 | 18 | 7 | 12 | 13 | 3 | 15 | 3 | 7 | | | | | 8th | **305** |
| 2003 | | | | | HMS | PHX | MOT | INDY | TXS | PPIR | RIR | KAN | NSH | MCH | GAT | KTY | NAZ | CHI | FON | TXS | | | | | |
| 2003 | Dallara IR-03 | Chevrolet Indy V8 | (United States) Buddy Lazier | 91 | | 11 | 19 | 21 | 13 | 10 | 20 | 13 | 14 | 12 | 11 | 16 | 13 | 16 | | | | | | 19th | **201** |
| 2003 | Dallara IR-03 | Chevrolet Indy V8 | (United States) Richie Hearn | 91 | | | | | | | | | | | | | | | 21 | 18 | | | | 28th | **39** |
| 2004 | | | | | HMS | PHX | MOT | INDY | TXS | RIR | KAN | NSH | MIL | MCH | KTY | PPIR | NAZ | CHI | FON | TXS | | | | | |
| 2004 | Dallara IR-04 | Chevrolet Indy V8 | (United States) Buddy Lazier | 91 | | | | 23 | | | | | | | | | | | | | | | | 33rd | **12** |
| 2005 | | | | | HMS | PHX | STP | MOT | INDY | TXS | RIR | KAN | NSH | MIL | MCH | KTY | PPIR | SNM | CHI | WGL | FON | | | | |
| 2005 | Dallara IR-05 | Toyota Indy V8 | (United States) Paul Dana **(R)** | 91 | 10 | 21 | | 20 | | | | | | | | | | | | | | | | 27th | **44** |
| 2005 | Dallara IR-05 | Toyota Indy V8 | (United States) Jimmy Kite | 91 | | | | | 32 | 22 | 13 | 19 | 13 | 14 | 13 | 10 | 17 | | 18 | | 13 | | | 22nd | **163** |
| 2006 | | | | | HMS | STP | MOT | INDY | WGL | TXS | RIR | KAN | NSH | MIL | MCH | KTY | SNM | CHI | | | | | | | |
| 2006 | Dallara IR-05 | Honda HI6R V8 | (United States) P. J. Chesson **(R)** | 91 | 12 | 17 | 17 | 33 | | | | | | | | | | | | | | | | 22nd | **54** |
| 2006 | Dallara IR-05 | Honda HI6R V8 | (United States) Jeff Bucknum | 92 | | | | 32 | | | | | | | | | | | | | | | | 20th | **97** |
| 2007 | | | | | HMS | STP | MOT | KAN | INDY | MIL | TXS | IOW | RIR | WGL | NSH | MDO | MCH | KTY | SNM | DET | CHI | | | | |
| 2007 | Dallara IR-05 | Honda HI7R V8 | (United States) Richie Hearn | 91 | | | | | 23^{2} | | | | | | | | | | | | | | | 31st | **12** |
| 2008 | | | | | HMS | STP | MOT | LBH | KAN | INDY | MIL | TXS | IOW | RIR | WGL | NSH | MDO | EDM | KTY | SNM | DET | CHI | SRF | | |
| 2008 | Dallara IR-05 | Honda HI7R V8 | (United States) Buddy Lazier | 91 | | | | | | 17 | | | | | | | | | | | | | | 37th | **13** |
| 2009 | | | | | STP | LBH | KAN | INDY | MIL | TXS | IOW | RIR | WGL | TOR | EDM | KTY | MDO | SNM | CHI | MOT | HMS | | | | |
| 2009 | Dallara IR-05 | Honda HI7R V8 | (United States) Buddy Lazier | 91 | | | | DNQ | | | | | | | | | | | | | | | | NC | — |

1. The 1999 VisionAire 500K at Charlotte was cancelled after 79 laps due to spectator fatalities.
2. In conjunction with Racing Professionals.
