= James Chesson =

American racing driver (born 1980)

James Chesson (born September 14, 1980) is an American racing driver from Far Hills, New Jersey. He is the younger brother of former IndyCar Series driver P. J. Chesson.

In July 2000, he scored the first win of his career at the Williams Grove Speedway at Mechanicsburg. Later that year, in September, he came 2nd, 22nd, and 22nd in the Jack Gunn Memorial Triple 20s at the Williams Grove Speedway at Mechanicsburg as well as 6th in the time trials. The next day, Chesson came 9th in the 25 lap sprint at the 12th Annual Manufacturers Appreciation Night Super Sprints at Lincoln Speedway in Abbottstown.

In 2001, Chesson placed 16th in the Knoxville Nationals 25 lap sprint.

A sprint car driver who had made a number of appearances in the World of Outlaws series, James joined his older brother mid-season driving in the Indy Pro Series for three races in 2004, with James driving for veteran open wheel owner Mo Nunn. He was able to win in his second start in a race at California Speedway. Making only three starts, he was able to finish fourteenth in the 2004 championship. He returned in 2006 to drive in the Freedom 100 but was knocked out by suspension trouble.

== Racing record ==
=== American open–wheel racing results ===
(key) (Races in bold indicate pole position)

==== Indy Pro Series ====
Year	Team	1	2	3	4	5	6	7	8	9	10	11	12	Rank	Points
2004	Mo Nunn Racing	HMS	PHX	INDY	KAN	NSH	MIL	MIS	KTY	PPIR	CHI; 6	FON; 1	TXS; 13	**14th**	**95**
2006	Part Sourcing International	HMS	STP1	STP2	INDY; 18	WGL	IMS	NSH; DNS	MIL	KTY	SNM1	SNM2	CHI	**38th**	**19**
