= Brian Barnhart =

American motorsports executive (born 1961)

Brian Barnhart (born June 30, 1961) is an American motorsports executive. He is the senior vice president of operations for Rahal Letterman Lanigan Racing, and is known for his past roles within the IndyCar Series paddock, holding various positions for race teams and as a race director for the series.

== Career ==
=== Chief mechanic/pit crew ===
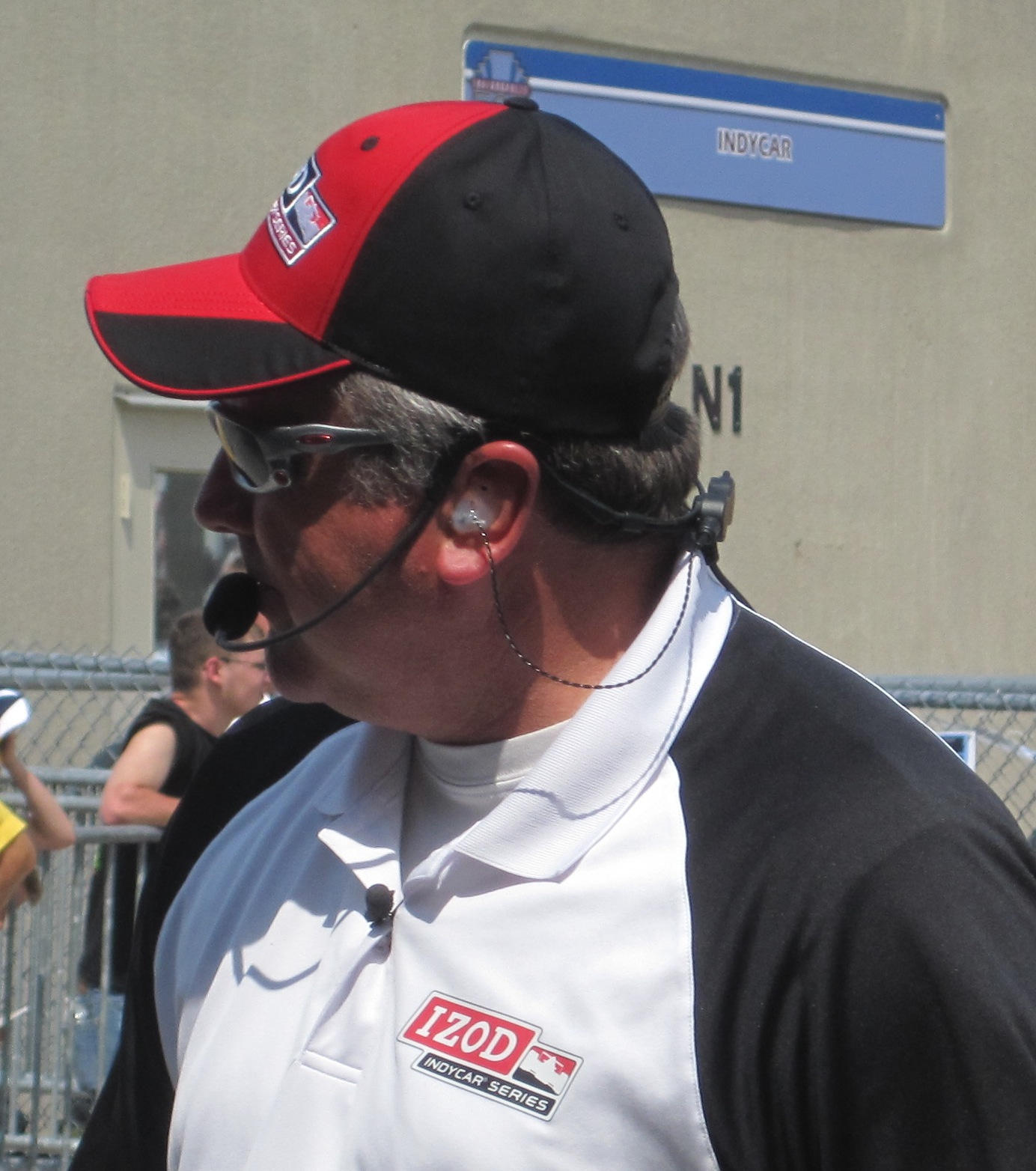
Barnhart at the Indianapolis Motor Speedway in 2010.

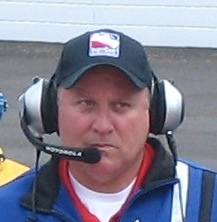
Barnhart at the Indianapolis Motor Speedway in 2009.

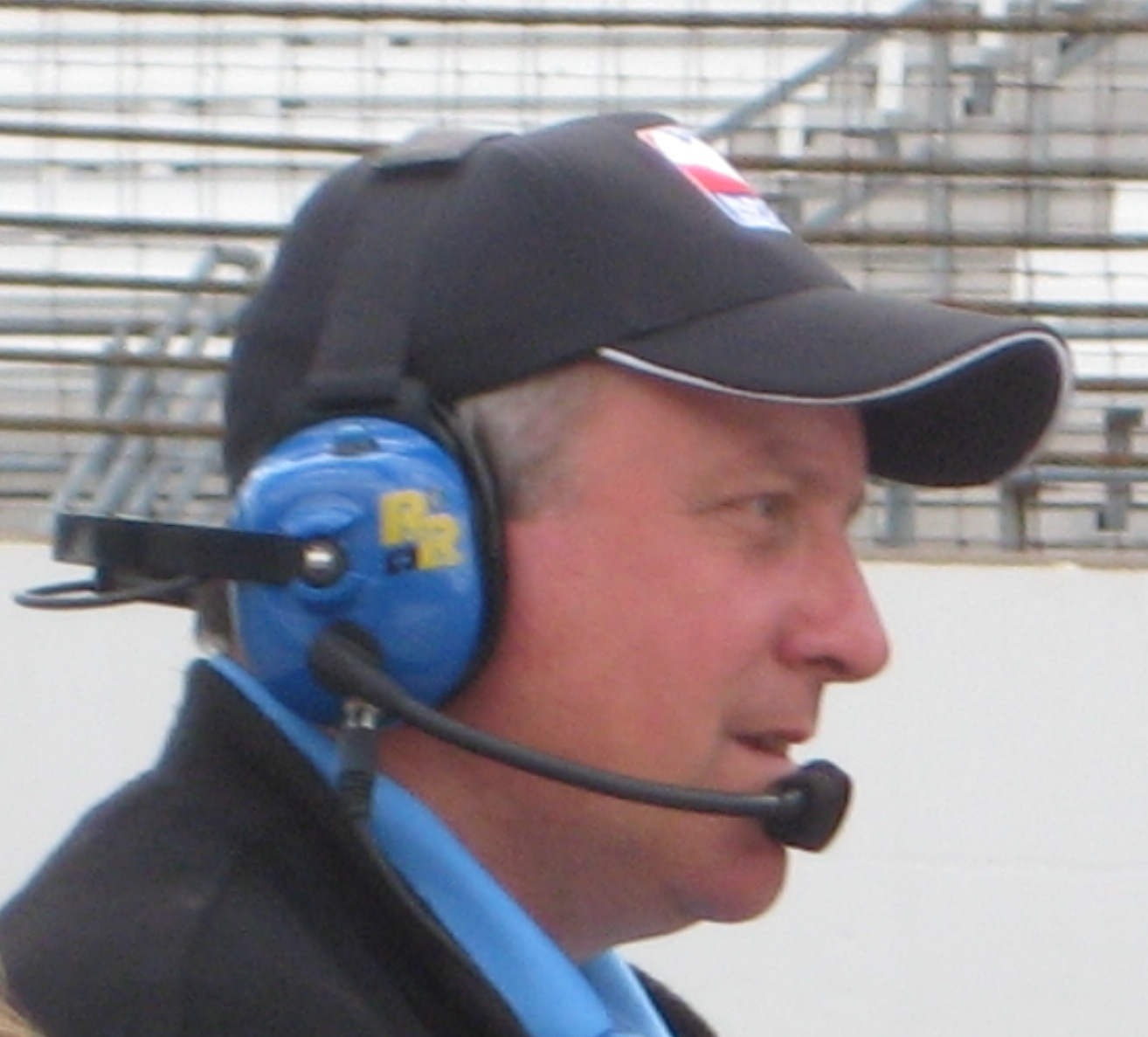
Barnhart at the Indianapolis Motor Speedway in 2008.

Barnhart served as a pit crew member or chief mechanic on IndyCar teams including Patrick Racing, Galles Racing and Team Penske. Teams Barnhart crewed for won two championships and two Indianapolis 500s. In 1990, he suffered minor injuries during a pit fire in Al Unser Jr.'s pit during the Budweiser Grand Prix of Cleveland. In the 1992 Indianapolis 500, Barnhart was the left-rear tire changer on the pit crew of Unser's winning car. In 1993, he served as chief mechanic for Al Unser Sr.'s King Racing, Kenny Bernstein-owned entry.

=== IndyCar race director ===
For 1994, Barnhart was working for the Indianapolis Motor Speedway as director of race operations. For the 1997 season, Barnhart had been hired by the Indy Racing League (IRL, now IndyCar Series) and was serving as its director of operations. In 2000, Barnhart was promoted to VP of operations. Barnhart would hold the position of race director until 2011. From 2005 to 2007, Barnhart was also president and CEO of the series.

On March 11, 2007, prominent open-wheel journalist Robin Miller reported that the IRL was seeking a new leader for its marketing side and that once found, Barnhart would return to his operations role. Terry Angstadt was subsequently hired to fill the role of President of Marketing Operations of the league and Randy Bernard was hired as CEO, leaving Barnhart to focus on operations.

During the 2011 season, Barnhart was criticized by fans, drivers, and owners, and especially Miller for inconsistencies in his role as chief race steward. For 2012, Barnhart was repurposed to the role of president of operations and strategy and the next year to vice president of competition.

For 2015, he was re-appointed by IndyCar as race director. Among Barnhart's roles in this position was to give final instructions at each driver's meeting before every race, including the public driver's meeting prior to the 2017 Indianapolis 500. He also was given a three-man Stewarding panel that assisted in assessing penalties, instead of being a lone chief steward, as he was through the 2011 season. The panel included former drivers Arie Luyendyk and Max Papis. Upon his departure after 2017, long-time detractor Robin Miller said, "I have to admit he was damn good as race director."

=== Team management/race strategist ===
For 2018, Barnhart became the president of Harding Racing and remained in the position as it became Harding Steinbrenner Racing. He also served as race strategist for driver Colton Herta, helping the young driver win his third career start. When HSR merged with Andretti Autosport for 2020, the parent team retained Herta and Barnhart.

For 2021 and 2022, Barnhart took a reduced role within Andretti, solely calling strategy for Andretti drivers James Hinchcliffe ('21) and Alexander Rossi ('22).

For 2023, Barnhart joined Arrow McLaren, being named general manager after president Taylor Kiel left the team. His move followed that of Rossi's, for whom he would continue to call strategy.

Barnhart left McLaren after the 2025 season, and joined Rahal Letterman Lanigan Racing as its senior vice president of operations and race strategist for Graham Rahal.

== Personal life ==
Barnhart is an Indianapolis native. He graduated from the University of Indianapolis with a degree in political science. As of 2000, he was married and has one daughter.
