= 2006 Indianapolis 500 =

American motor race

90th Indianapolis 500

Indianapolis Motor Speedway

Indianapolis 500
- Sanctioning body: Indy Racing League
- Season: 2006 IRL IndyCar Series
- Date: May 28, 2006
- Winner: (United States) Sam Hornish Jr.
- Winning team: Team Penske
- Winning Chief Mechanic: Matt Jonsson
- Time of race: 3:10:58.7590
- Average speed: 157.085 mph (252.804 km/h)
- Pole position: (United States) Sam Hornish Jr.
- Pole speed: 228.985 mph (368.516 km/h)
- Fastest qualifier: (United States) Sam Hornish Jr.
- Rookie of the Year: (United States) Marco Andretti
- Most laps led: (United Kingdom) Dan Wheldon (148)

Pre-race ceremonies
- National anthem: Members of United States Armed Forces
- "Back Home Again in Indiana": Jim Nabors
- Starting command: Mari Hulman George
- Pace car: Chevrolet Corvette
- Pace car driver: Lance Armstrong
- Starter: Bryan Howard
- Honorary starter: Sugar Ray Leonard
- Estimated attendance: 250,000

Television in the United States
- Network: ABC
- Announcers: Marty Reid, Scott Goodyear, Rusty Wallace
- Nielsen ratings: 5.0 / 14

Chronology
Previous	Next
2005	2007

The 2006 Indianapolis 500 (formally the 90th Indianapolis 500-Mile Race) was an IRL IndyCar Series open-wheel race held on Sunday, May 28, 2006, at the Indianapolis Motor Speedway in Speedway, Indiana, before approximately 250,000 spectators. It was the fourth race of the 2006 IRL IndyCar Series season, the 90th running of the event, and the ninth under Indy Racing League (IRL) sanctioning.

The month of May began with Rookie Orientations on May 7, and the track was opened to all competitors for practice two days later. Time trials were scheduled to be held on May 13–14 and May 20–21; however, the first two days were rained out, forcing IRL officials to push pole qualifying back to May 20. Sam Hornish Jr. of Team Penske quickly emerged as a pre-race favorite, setting quickest times in all but one practice session and earning the pole position. The last day of qualifying, Bump Day, saw a battle for the final starting position between Thiago Medeiros and Marty Roth. Medeiros took the position after Roth crashed with less than an hour left. The 30th annual Pit Stop Challenge was won by Hélio Castroneves' pit crew.

In the race, Wheldon first took the lead on the tenth lap and went on to lead a race-high 148 laps, relinquishing the lead during pit stop cycles. Hornish Jr. overtook Wheldon soon after a restart on lap 130, but Wheldon got by him 15 laps later. Hornish Jr. was then dropped to the rear of the field due to a pit stop blunder under a caution flag period. As part of a strategy to assume the lead late in the race, he and Michael Andretti made their final stops on the 160th lap. Meanwhile, during a battle for the lead with Tony Kanaan, Wheldon drifted up the track and his tire punctured. An unexpected pit stop cost him a shot at the victory.

A luckily-timed caution with under ten laps remaining helped Michael Andretti and Hornish Jr. move up to the front of the field along with 19-year-old rookie Marco Andretti, who pitted seconds before the caution. One lap after the restart, Marco Andretti passed his father, Michael, in the first corner. Hornish Jr. soon moved up to second place and made several attempts to pass Andretti. On the final lap, Hornish Jr. executed a slingshot pass to the left side of Andretti with about 450 feet (140 m) from the finish line to take his sole Indianapolis 500 win and Roger Penske's record-extending 14th win as a car owner in the event. It was the first time in Indianapolis 500 history that a driver completed a pass on the last lap for the win, and the margin of victory — 0.0635 seconds — was the second-closest in the race's history at the time, and the fourth-closest finish as of 2026. Despite Andretti's loss, he was unanimously named Rookie of the Year.

Hornish Jr. went on to win his third (and final) Drivers' Championship in the IndyCar Series later that season, becoming the second consecutive driver to accomplish the feat. Tom Carnegie, who had commentated the Indianapolis 500 every year since 1946, announced his retirement from being Indianapolis Motor Speedway's public address announcer weeks after this race.

== Race background ==
The Indianapolis 500, commonly shortened to the Indy 500, is an annual race held at the Indianapolis Motor Speedway, a four-turn, 2.5 mi (4.0 km) asphalt oval circuit, in Speedway, Indiana, United States. The event is contested by "Indy cars", a formula of professional-level, single-seat, open cockpit, open-wheel, purpose-built race cars. Since its inaugural running in 1911, the Indianapolis 500 has become a staple of Memorial Day weekend and one of, if not the, most prestigious races in motorsports. Dan Wheldon was the defending race winner.

Chevrolet and Toyota both announced their withdrawals from the IndyCar Series after the 2005 season, leaving Honda as the sole engine provider for all teams for 2006 and beyond. IndyCar's single-engine program allowed costs to be reduced for teams who were looking to buy or lease an engine. It marked the first time since 1960 that every entry in the Indianapolis 500 would be fielded with the same engine.

A new series initiative introduced the use of ethanol fuel. As part of a two-year roll-out, all entries for 2006 were required to utilize a 10% ethanol and 90% methanol fuel blend (E10). While this was the first time all entries in the Indianapolis 500 utilized ethanol fuel, it was not the first time that ethanol was used during the race. Leon Duray's Miller car was fueled by ethyl alcohols in 1927, and Art Sparks claimed to have used ethanol in his cars in 1937–1939.

The final hour of each practice and qualifying session for the Indianapolis 500 was known as "Happy Hour" because the cooler track temperatures, caused by the sun setting behind the front-stretch grandstands, produced significantly faster speeds. As a result, many teams would scramble to put down the fastest lap of the session before time expired. However, a month prior to the 2006 Indianapolis 500, Indiana began using daylight saving time for the first time in over 30 years, inadvertently ending the "Happy Hour" tradition.

=== 2006 IndyCar Series ===
The Indianapolis 500 was the fourth round of the 2006 IndyCar Series season. Marlboro Team Penske driver Hélio Castroneves entered the event with the Drivers' Championship lead, having earned 146 points and two wins in the first three races of the season. Wheldon trailed Castroneves by 42 points. Sam Hornish Jr. earned 94 points and placed third in the standings. Scott Dixon, with 92 points, and Tony Kanaan, with 89 points, took the fourth and fifth positions, respectively.

== Race schedule ==
Race schedule — May 2006
Sun	Mon	Tue	Wed	Thu	Fri	Sat
	1	2	3	4	5	6 Mini-Marathon
7 ROP	8 ROP	9 Practice	10; Practice	11; Practice	12; Practice; Fast Friday	13; Time Trials
14; Time Trials	15	16	17; Practice	18; Practice	19; Practice	20; Pole Day
21; Bump Day	22	23	24; Community Day	25; Indy Pro Series Time Trials	26; Carb Day; Freedom 100	27; Parade
28; Indianapolis 500	29; Memorial Day	30	31			

Color	Notes
Green	Practice
Dark blue	Time trials
Silver	Race day
Red	Rained out*
Blank	No track activity

* Includes days where track activity
was significantly limited due to rain

== Entry list ==
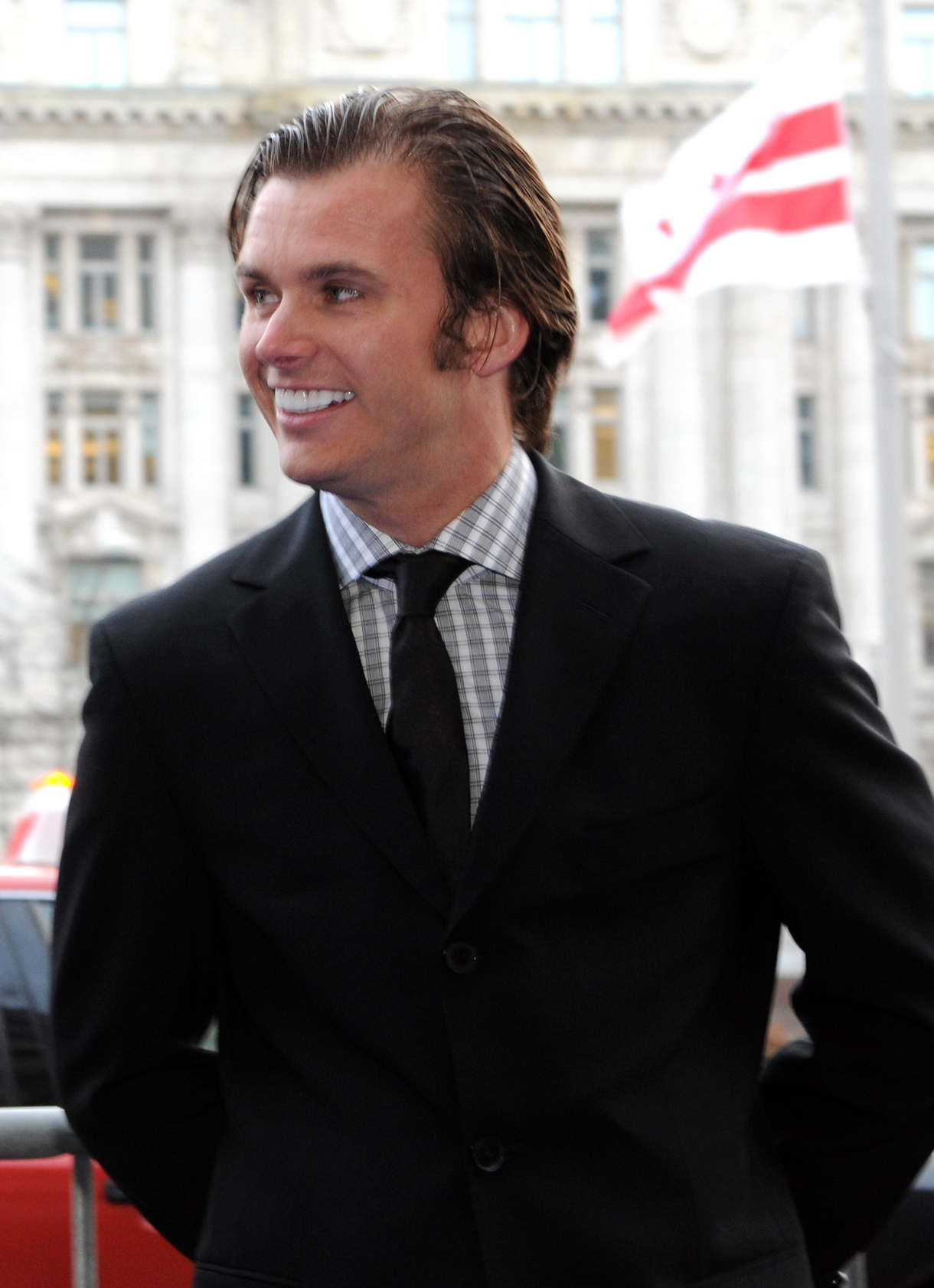
Dan Wheldon (pictured in 2010) was the defending race winner.

The official entry list for the 2006 Indianapolis 500 was released on April 13, 2006. Entry invitations were mailed to eligible race teams on February 22, and the deadline was set on April 5. Sixty-six cars for 38 entries were featured on the entry list, with 26 drivers being named to the entries. By May 7, the entry list had been updated, with 31 car-driver combinations being announced. Among the drivers entered were six former winners of the race and three race rookies. Each car used Honda Indy V8 engines and Firestone tires. Dallara and Panoz were the chassis providers.

=== Team and driver changes ===
The biggest storyline heading into the Indianapolis 500 revolved around Dan Wheldon, who opted to drive for Target Chip Ganassi Racing in 2006, despite winning the Indianapolis 500 and the IndyCar Series championship with Andretti Green Racing the previous season. Replacing him in the No. 26 entry would be third-generation driver Marco Andretti, who was one of the three race rookies. Andretti's father, Michael Andretti, announced his comeback from retirement to compete in the Indianapolis 500 alongside his son, driving the one-off No. 1 entry for Andretti Green Racing.

Similarly, 1998 Indianapolis 500 winner Eddie Cheever made his return to the IndyCar Series and the Indianapolis 500 for the first time since 2002. During his hiatus, Cheever exclusively focused his efforts on his ownership role at Cheever Racing. Two-time Indianapolis 500 winner Al Unser Jr. also came out of retirement and returned to the Indianapolis 500. He was teamed with 1996 winner Buddy Lazier in the Dreyer & Reinbold Racing-prepared No. 31 car.

On March 23, Rahal Letterman Racing filed three entries for the Indianapolis 500, which were to be driven by 2004 race winner Buddy Rice, 2005 Rookie of the Year driver Danica Patrick, and series rookie Paul Dana. However, after Dana was killed in a practice crash at Homestead–Miami Speedway on March 26, team co-owner Bobby Rahal selected seven-time Indy Pro Series winner Jeff Simmons to drive Dana's No. 17 entry for the remainder of the season, including the Indianapolis 500.

== Testing and Rookie Orientation ==
The Rookie Orientation and Refresher Programs, the latter of which were for drivers who did not race in the previous Indianapolis 500, took place at Indianapolis on May 7 and May 8, with ten drivers partaking in the test sessions. Rookie Orientation consists of four phases; the first phase features speeds between 195 and 200 mph (314 and 322 km/h), the second phase features speeds between 200 and 205 mph (322 and 330 km/h), the third phase features speeds between 205 and 210 mph (330 and 338 km/h), and the fourth phase features speeds above 215 mph (346 km/h). The rookie drivers had to pass all four phases in order to be eligible to race in the Indianapolis 500.

=== Testing – October 2005 ===
On October 6 and October 7, 2005, a test was conducted at Indianapolis to evaluate Firestone tires. Castroneves, Wheldon, and Rice, all of whom were past Indianapolis 500 winners, were the lone participants. No incidents were reported, and all three drivers were happy with the test.

=== Open test – Wednesday April 5 ===
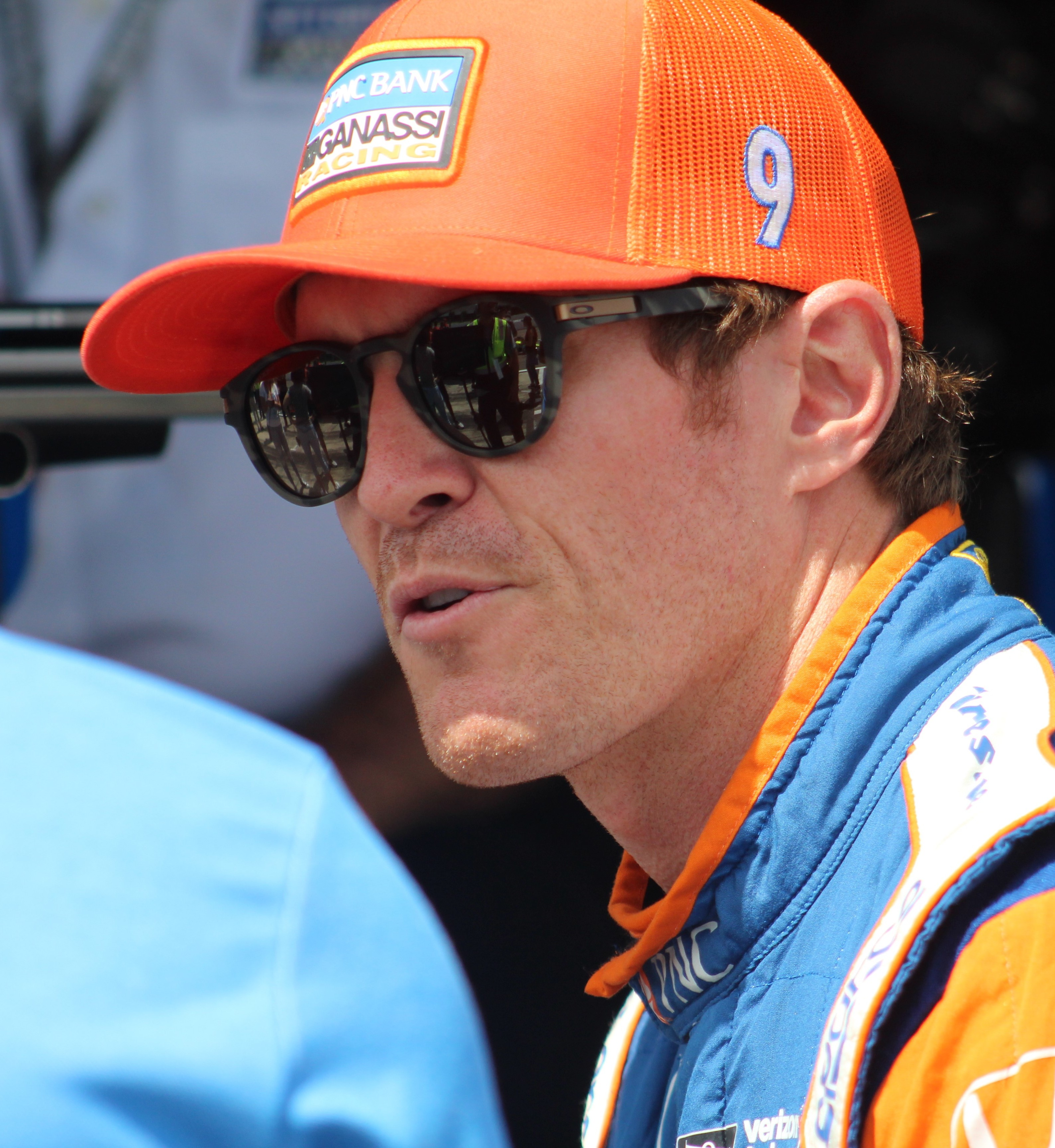
Scott Dixon (pictured in 2018) led the speed charts in the open test.

An open testing session was held on April 5, 2006, in order to assess the efficiency of the Honda engines. Seventeen drivers participated in this open test session, which started 42 minutes late due to cool track temperatures. As a result of the late start, the session was extended by an hour and finished at 5:00 PM (UTC−04:00). Dixon was fastest in the session with a speed of 226.012 mph (363.731 km/h). A total of 1,404 laps were completed by the seventeen drivers without incident. Lazier and Dreyer & Reinbold Racing were scheduled to take part in this testing session, but withdrew after one of their cars suffered an electrical fire at Homestead.

Top Speeds
Pos	No.	Driver	Team	Chassis	Speed (mph)	Speed (km/h)
1	9	(New Zealand) Scott Dixon	Target Chip Ganassi Racing	Dallara	226.012	363.731
2	6	(United States) Sam Hornish Jr.	Marlboro Team Penske	Dallara	225.355	362.674
3	10	(United Kingdom) Dan Wheldon	Target Chip Ganassi Racing	Dallara	224.450	361.217

=== Opening Day and Rookie Orientation – Sunday May 7 ===
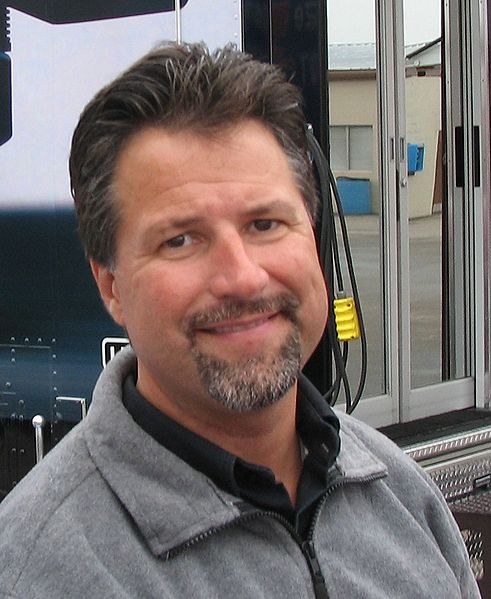
Michael Andretti (pictured in 2007) passed his Refresher Test on Sunday.

May 7, the opening day for the Indianapolis 500, began with a celebration of the Andretti family. Mario, Michael, and Marco Andretti completed a three-wide ceremonial lap around Indianapolis, with Mario driving the same car with which he won the pole position for the 1967 Indianapolis 500. At 12:10 PM local time, Marco Andretti became the first driver to complete a lap on opening day, and passed the Rookie Orientation along with P. J. Chesson. Michael Andretti, Unser Jr., Arie Luyendyk Jr., and Townsend Bell participated on the first day of refresher testing, with Andretti setting the fastest lap of the day at a speed of 220.999 mph (355.663 km/h) and easily passing his test. Four caution flags were thrown during the session, three of which were for debris and one for a mechanical issue involving Bell, who stopped his car at the entrance of pit lane.

Top Speeds
Pos	No.	Driver	Team	Chassis	Speed (mph)	Speed (km/h)
1	1	(United States) Michael Andretti	Andretti Green Racing	Dallara	220.999	355.663
2	26	(United States) Marco Andretti R	Andretti Green Racing	Dallara	220.572	354.976
3	91	(United States) P. J. Chesson R	Hemelgarn Racing	Dallara	214.302	344.886

=== Rookie Orientation – Monday May 8 ===
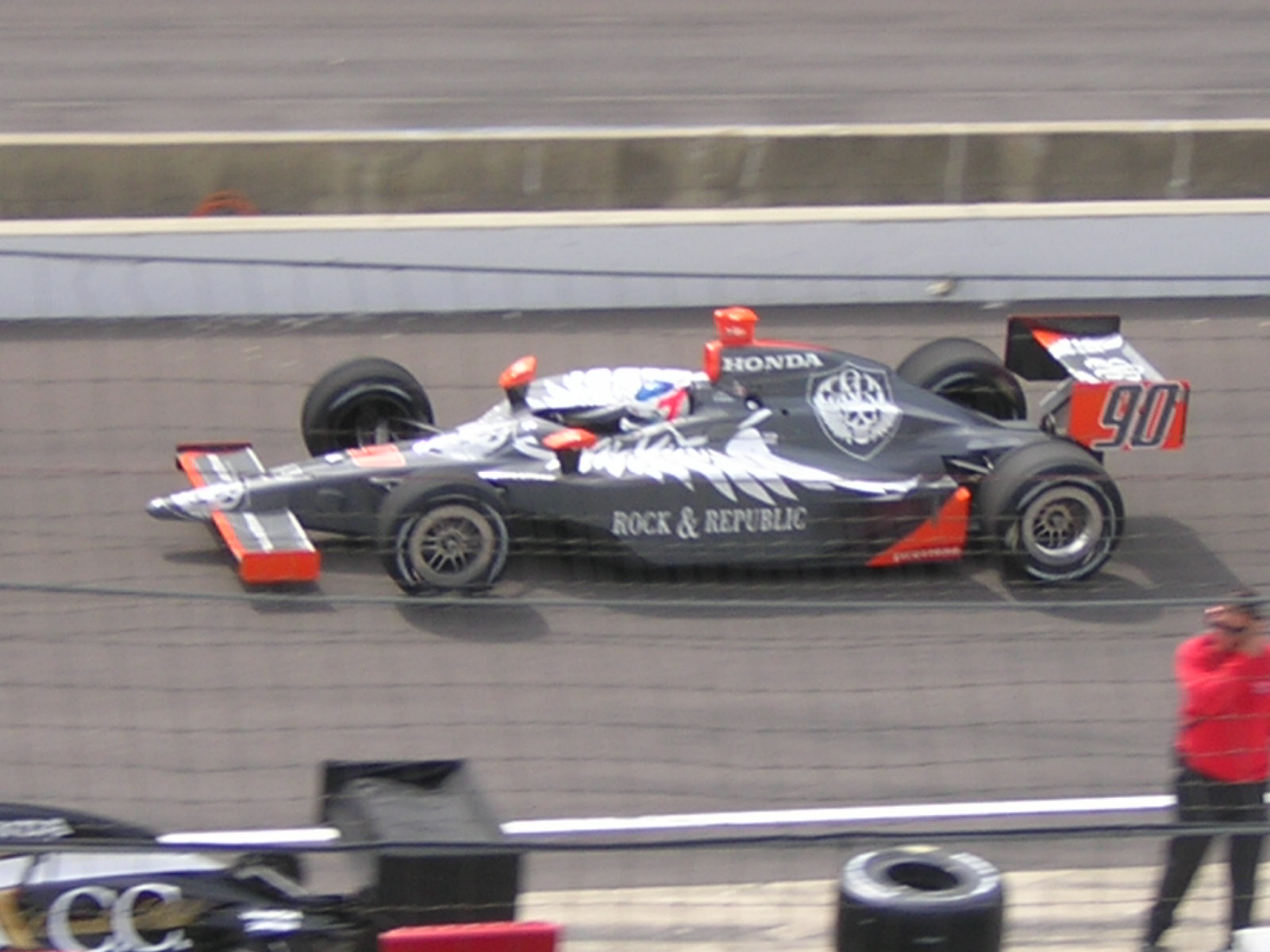
Townsend Bell passed his Rookie Orientation test on Monday.

On May 8, the second day of Rookie Orientation, eight drivers took to the track under sunny conditions. Bell set the fastest lap of the five-hour, incident-free session with a lap of 221.381 mph (356.278 km/h). He and Thiago Medeiros passed the rookie test, while Luyendyk Jr., Larry Foyt, and Unser Jr. all passed the refresher test. With an hour remaining in the session, Michael Andretti lent his son his No. 1 Honda for a handful of laps around the circuit because of complaints that Marco had about his own No. 26 Honda regarding grip.

Top Speeds
Pos	No.	Driver	Team	Chassis	Speed (mph)	Speed (km/h)
1	90	(United States) Townsend Bell R	Vision Racing	Dallara	221.381	356.278
2	1	(United States) Michael Andretti	Andretti Green Racing	Dallara	221.324	356.186
3	1	(United States) Marco Andretti R	Andretti Green Racing	Dallara	221.267	356.095

== Practice – Week 1 ==
=== Tuesday May 9 ===
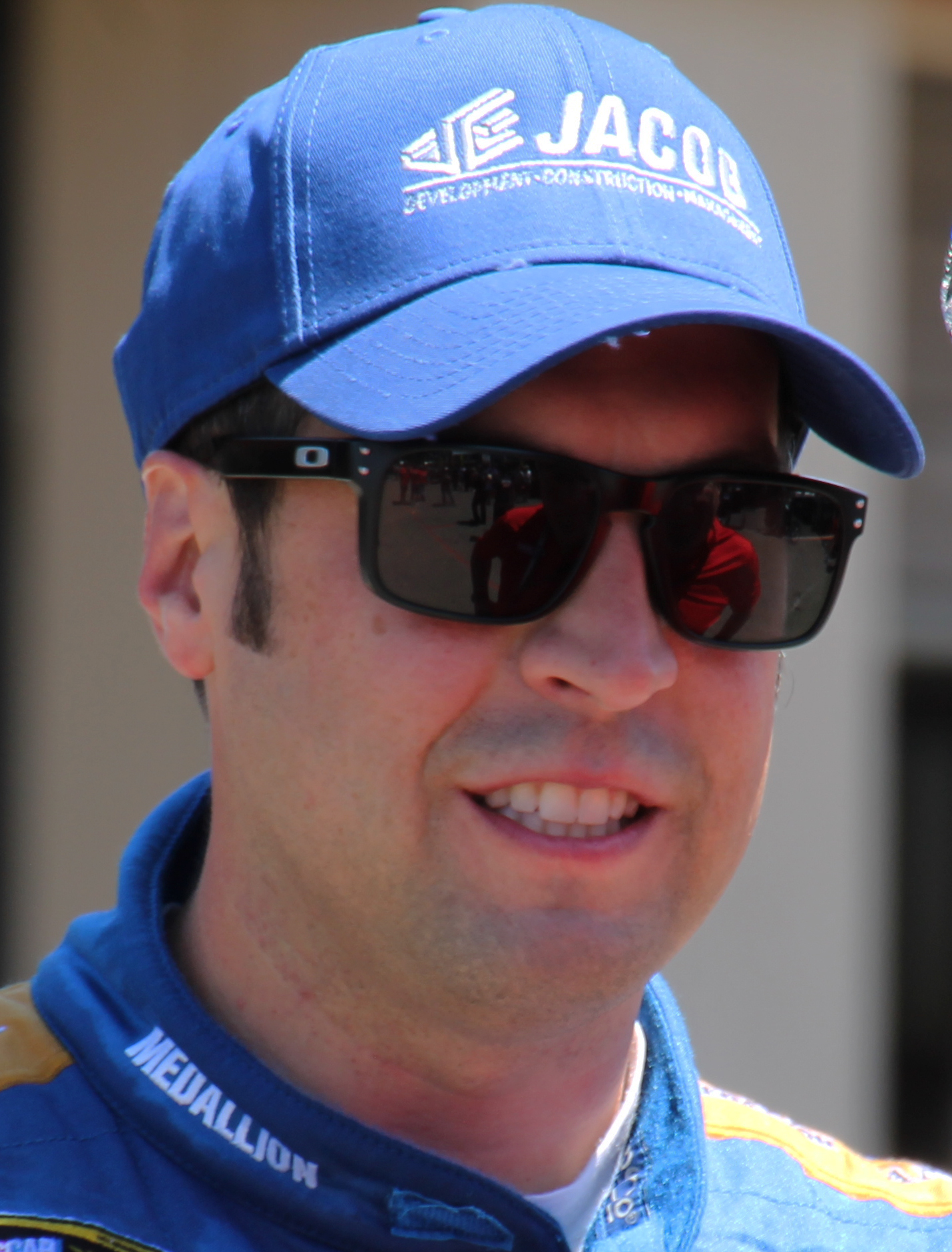
Sam Hornish Jr. (pictured in 2015) set the fastest lap of the practice sessions on Tuesday, Wednesday, and Thursday.

The day began with a parade lap featuring all six previous winners of the Indianapolis 500 (Wheldon, Rice, Castroneves, Cheever, Lazier, and Unser Jr.) who were competing in the event. Four-time Indianapolis 500 winner Rick Mears waved the green flag to begin the lap. The track was later opened to all entries at 12:14 PM local time, with Wheldon and Kosuke Matsuura being the first drivers to go on track. Eleven minutes into the session, Dario Franchitti brushed the wall in the chute between the third and fourth turns, bringing out the first caution. After three cautions for debris and track inspection, Cheever's car lost power in turn three and was towed to pit road, causing the fifth caution of the day.

Weather conditions throughout the day were slightly warm but cloudy, and rain fell on the track with fifty minutes remaining, thus prematurely ending the session. Hornish Jr. set the fastest lap of the day within the first hour of the session, at a speed of 224.811 mph (361.798 km/h). He and his teammate Castroneves, who was second-quickest with a speed of 224.106 mph (360.664 km/h), were driving their back-up cars when they put down their quickest laps. They later drove with their primary cars and set the fifth and sixth-fastest laps of the day.

Top Speeds
Pos	No.	Driver	Team	Chassis	Speed (mph)	Speed (km/h)
1	6	(United States) Sam Hornish Jr.	Marlboro Team Penske	Dallara	224.811	361.798
2	3	(Brazil) Hélio Castroneves	Marlboro Team Penske	Dallara	224.106	360.664
3	10	(United Kingdom) Dan Wheldon	Target Chip Ganassi Racing	Dallara	223.916	360.358

=== Wednesday May 10 ===
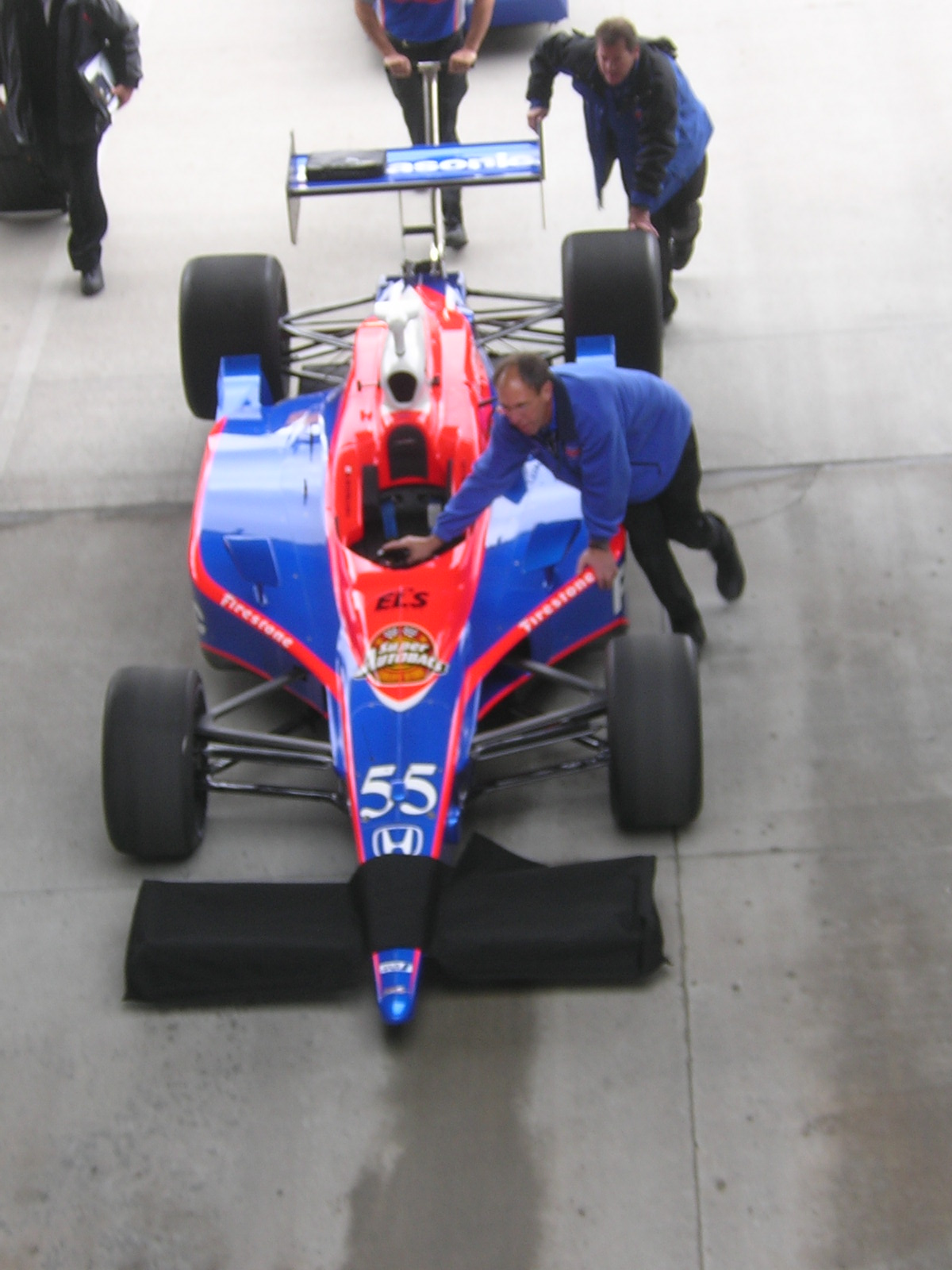
Kosuke Matsuura was third-fastest in practice on Wednesday.

Professional pool player Jeanette Lee was given the honors to wave the green flag to signal the start of the session at noon. Only three minutes into the session, Simmons lost control of his car exiting the first corner and spun to the inside of the track, making slight contact with the retaining wall. Simmons' car was repaired and he rejoined the track less than an hour later. Overcast conditions persisted at Indianapolis, and the session was stopped twice due to rainfall. Ultimately, rain forced the track to close at 3:57 PM local time. Hornish Jr. was again the fastest driver of the day, with a top speed of 226.056 mph (363.802 km/h).

Top Speeds
Pos	No.	Driver	Team	Chassis	Speed (mph)	Speed (km/h)
1	6	(United States) Sam Hornish Jr.	Marlboro Team Penske	Dallara	226.056	363.802
2	10	(United Kingdom) Dan Wheldon	Target Chip Ganassi Racing	Dallara	225.636	363.126
3	55	(Japan) Kosuke Matsuura	Super Aguri Fernández Racing	Dallara	225.140	362.328

=== Thursday May 11 ===
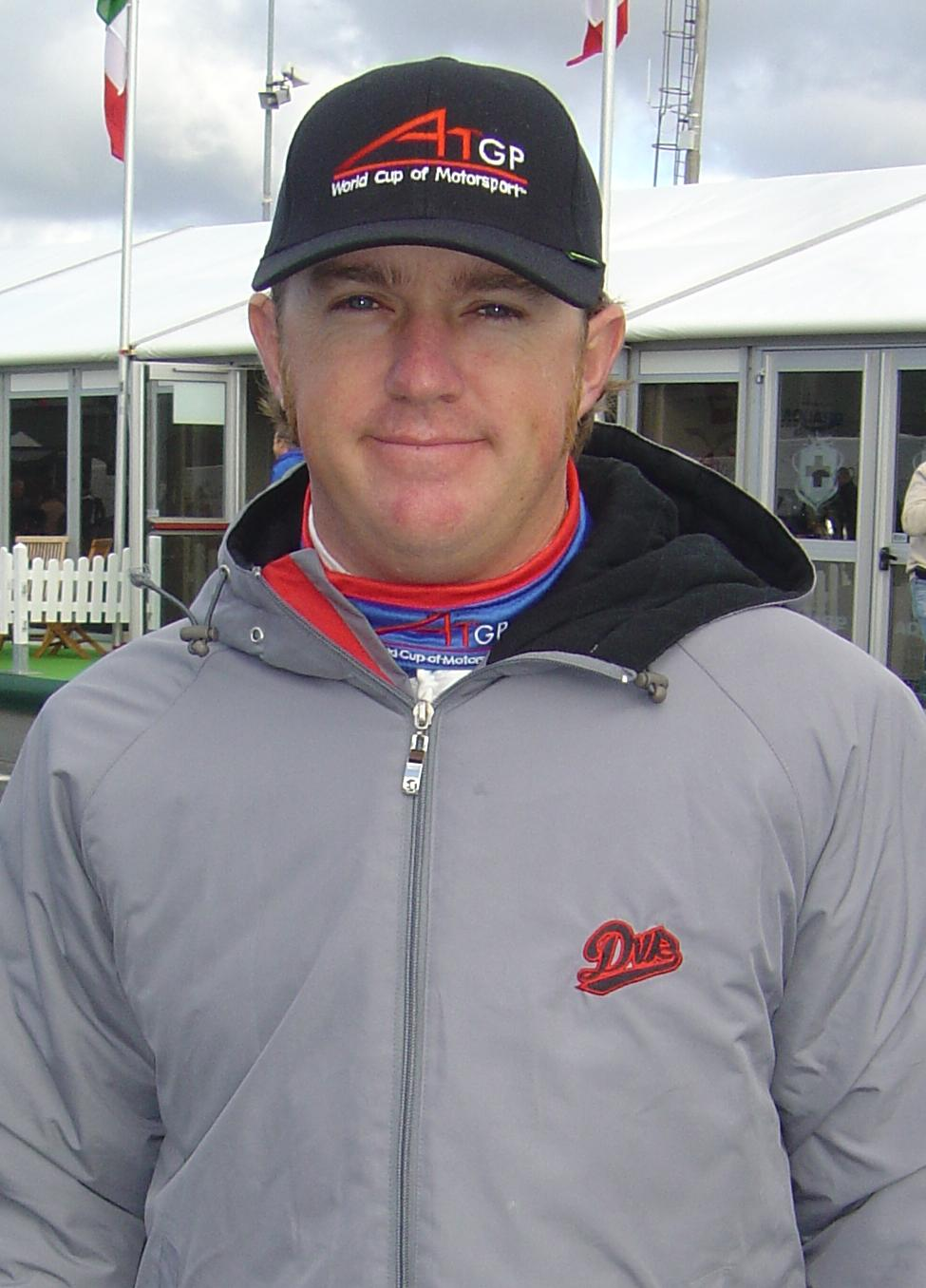
Buddy Rice (pictured in 2007) was fifteenth-quickest on Thursday, but crashed in the second turn.

For the third consecutive day, rain limited track activity. The session was scheduled to begin at noon, but rain forced the session to be postponed and instead start at 1:54 PM local time. Rice experienced a violent crash when his car oversteered as he entered the second turn and slammed into the outside SAFER barrier. The crash was eerily similar to a crash that Rice suffered at the same spot in 2005, which kept him out of that year's Indianapolis 500. Rice suffered contusions to both knees and was initially uncleared to race, but was medically revised and permitted to race the next day. He and Marty Roth, who spun on the front straightaway almost an hour later and suffered no damage, caused the only incidents of the day. The session was cut short by moist track conditions with 22 minutes remaining. Once again, Hornish Jr. topped the speed charts at 226.789 mph (364.982 km/h).

Top Speeds
Pos	No.	Driver	Team	Chassis	Speed (mph)	Speed (km/h)
1	6	(United States) Sam Hornish Jr.	Marlboro Team Penske	Dallara	226.789	364.982
2	10	(United Kingdom) Dan Wheldon	Target Chip Ganassi Racing	Dallara	226.088	363.853
3	3	(Brazil) Hélio Castroneves	Marlboro Team Penske	Dallara	225.547	362.983

=== Fast Friday – Friday May 12 ===
Indiana Fever players Tamika Catchings and Tamika Whitmore were set to wave the green flag at noon to begin "Fast Friday". However, intermittent rainfall dampened the speedway, forcing IndyCar to cancel all track activity for the day. A random draw was held that same day to determine the order of time trials the next day, and Jeff Bucknum drew first in line.

== Time trials – Weekend 1 ==
=== Pole Day – Saturday May 13 ===
Under the race's qualification procedure, nicknamed "11-11-11" and introduced in 2005, the first eleven positions were to be filled on Saturday, with bumping occurring for these positions until 6:00 PM in order to determine the pole winner and the top eleven starters of the Indianapolis 500. However, for the second day in a row, all track activity was cancelled due to inclement conditions.

=== Second Day – Sunday May 14 ===
Due to the cancellation of Pole Day, the second day of time trials permitted the first 22 positions to be filled. A pre-qualifying practice session was scheduled to be held at 9:30 AM, but was instead postponed to 1:21 PM due to track drying. The session was also split into two groups, and cut short at 2:15 PM after a moist track surface was reported in the first and second turns. Wheldon lapped the fastest speed of the month of May during the session at 228.663 mph (367.997 km/h). Qualifying was postponed to the following weekend because of the continuous rainfall, marking the first time since 1983 that the first two days of qualifying were rained out.

== Practice – Week 2 ==
=== Wednesday May 17 ===
Eddie Gill of the Indiana Pacers waved the green flag to commence the practice session. He later rode in the Indy Racing Experience two-seater car. The track was exclusively opened at 11:45 AM for race rookies and veterans who had not participated in the previous Indianapolis 500; the track was opened to all entries after 30 minutes. For the seventh time throughout the month of May, rain brought an early end to the session at 4:38 PM. Hornish Jr., with a top speed of 224.381 mph (361.106 km/h), was the fastest driver of the session, which went without any incidents.

Top Speeds
Pos	No.	Driver	Team	Chassis	Speed (mph)	Speed (km/h)
1	6	(United States) Sam Hornish Jr.	Marlboro Team Penske	Dallara	224.381	361.106
2	3	(Brazil) Hélio Castroneves	Marlboro Team Penske	Dallara	223.392	359.515
3	8	(United States) Scott Sharp	Delphi Fernández Racing	Dallara	223.293	359.355

=== Thursday May 18 ===
The practice session, which was planned to begin with country artist Blaine Larsen waving the green flag, was delayed by over three and a half hours due to rainfall, marking the eighth consecutive day that track activity was hindered by poor weather. Only ten minutes into the session, Luyendyk Jr.'s car crashed into the SAFER barrier exiting turn one, causing the first caution of the day. The second stoppage occurred with about fifteen minutes remaining, when Medeiros' car also backed into the SAFER barrier at the same spot. Neither driver was injured. The brief session was called off at 5:42 PM, when even more rain drenched the track surface. With a fastest lap speed of 224.951 mph (362.024 km/h), Hornish Jr. topped the charts yet again.

Top Speeds
Pos	No.	Driver	Team	Chassis	Speed (mph)	Speed (km/h)
1	6	(United States) Sam Hornish Jr.	Marlboro Team Penske	Dallara	224.951	362.024
2	3	(Brazil) Hélio Castroneves	Marlboro Team Penske	Dallara	224.437	361.196
3	10	(United Kingdom) Dan Wheldon	Target Chip Ganassi Racing	Dallara	222.616	358.266

=== Friday May 19 ===
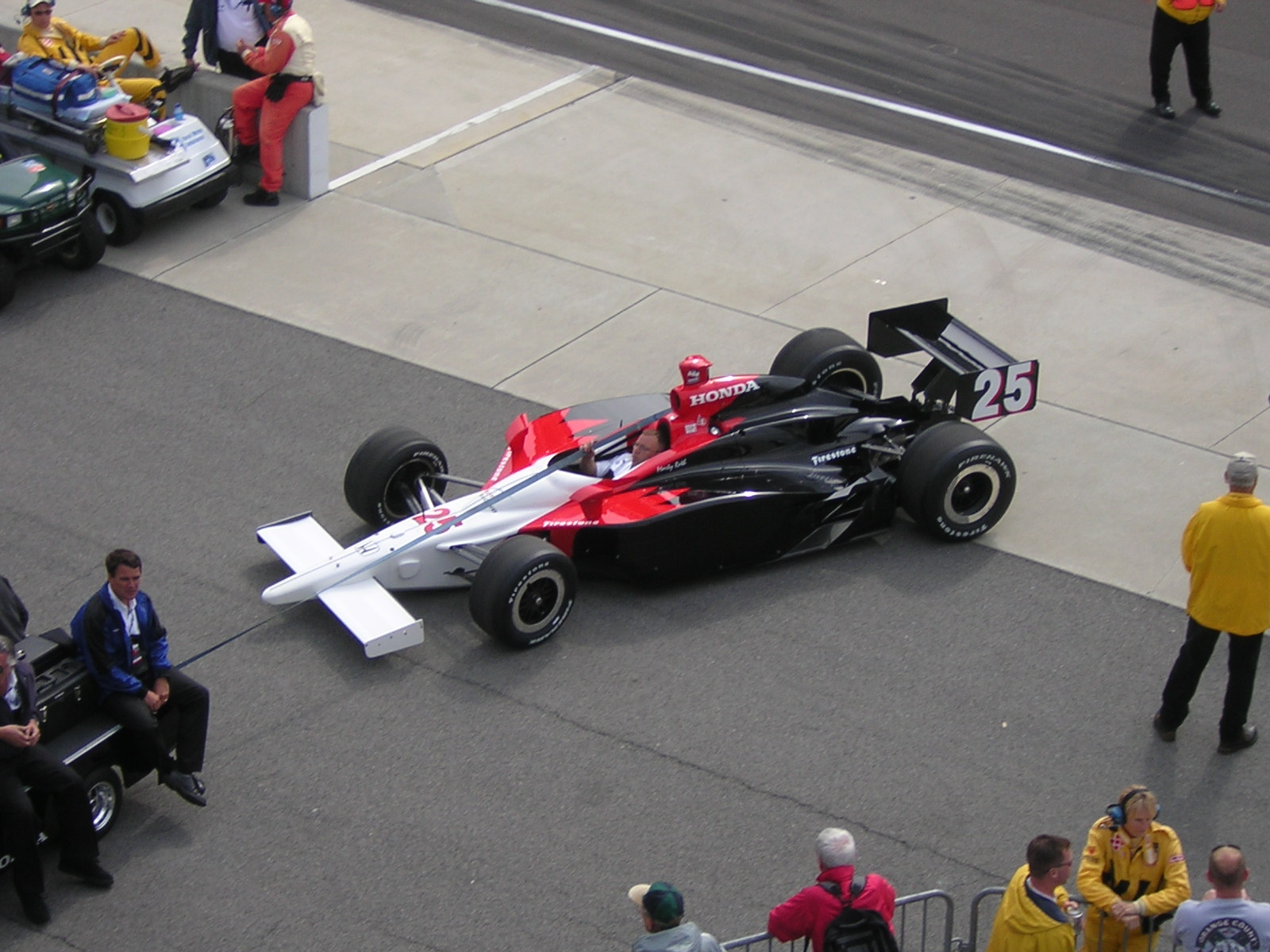
Marty Roth spun out on Friday.

Greg Oden, Mike Conley Jr., and Jack Keefer from Lawrence North High School set about the final full-practice day leading up to the Indianapolis 500. Weather conditions were initially clear of any clouds; however, by 2:00 PM, skies had become partly cloudy, and rain briefly returned yet again at 5:30 PM, though it quickly cleared off. At 2:37 PM, Roth experienced his second incident of the month when he spun while exiting the third turn, making no contact with the barrier. Almost three hours later, Simmons slammed the outside wall in turn one just seconds after putting down his fastest lap of the day. He was uninjured and cleared to drive for time trials the following day. For the sixth time throughout May, Hornish Jr. lapped the quickest speed at 227.925 mph (366.810 km/h).

Top Speeds
Pos	No.	Driver	Team	Chassis	Speed (mph)	Speed (km/h)
1	6	(United States) Sam Hornish Jr.	Marlboro Team Penske	Dallara	227.925	366.810
2	9	(New Zealand) Scott Dixon	Target Chip Ganassi Racing	Dallara	227.322	365.839
3	10	(United Kingdom) Dan Wheldon	Target Chip Ganassi Racing	Dallara	227.040	365.385

== Time trials – Weekend 2 ==
=== Pole Day – Saturday May 20 ===
==== Pre-qualifying practice ====
The preluding practice session leading up to time trials began at 9:30 AM. Unlike the other practice sessions, this session was divided into two groups, with each group receiving thirty minutes of track time. From 10:30 AM to 11:00 AM, practice would be open for all entries. Hornish Jr. turned a lap at 229.996 mph (370.143 km/h) during the session, which was the fastest lap of the month.

==== Qualifying ====
This is the best day of my life at the Speedway. Hopefully we can be in this same position next Sunday, too.

— Sam Hornish Jr., following time trials on Saturday.

Qualifying began at 12:00 PM local time, and was held under sunny and fairly windy conditions, with air temperatures reaching 64 °F (18 °C). Because the first two days of time trials were rained out, all 33 positions were available to be filled on Saturday, including the pole position. Hornish Jr. continued his sheer dominance of the month of May by earning the pole position with a fastest four-lap average speed of 228.985 mph (368.516 km/h); this marked his tenth career pole position in IndyCar and his first in the Indianapolis 500; it was also the record-extending thirteenth race pole for Team Penske. Castroneves, Hornish Jr.'s teammate, earned the second position at 228.008 mph (366.943 km/h), and Wheldon took third at 227.338 mph (365.865 km/h). The only incident of the day occurred when Roth spun exiting the first turn during an hour-long practice session in between qualifications.

During Franchitti's first qualification attempt, he experienced engine trouble after three laps and was waved off the track. Franchitti's team changed his engine and he was able to ensure a spot in the Indianapolis 500 three hours later. Bell was the lone driver to withdraw his first qualifying attempt, and improved his starting position from 16th to 15th as a result of his second attempt. Thirty-two drivers secured positions in the Indianapolis 500, and leading into Bump Day, the battle for the 33rd and final position would be decided between Roth and Medeiros, neither of whom made a qualifying attempt on Saturday.

Pos	No.	Driver	Team	Chassis	Speed (mph)	Speed (km/h)
Positions 1–32
1	6	(United States) Sam Hornish Jr.	Marlboro Team Penske	Dallara	228.985	368.516
2	3	(Brazil) Hélio Castroneves W	Marlboro Team Penske	Dallara	228.008	366.943
3	10	(United Kingdom) Dan Wheldon W	Target Chip Ganassi Racing	Dallara	227.338	365.865
4	9	(New Zealand) Scott Dixon	Target Chip Ganassi Racing	Dallara	226.921	365.194
5	11	(Brazil) Tony Kanaan	Andretti Green Racing	Dallara	226.776	364.961
6	4	(Brazil) Vítor Meira	Panther Racing	Dallara	226.156	363.963
7	55	(Japan) Kosuke Matsuura	Super Aguri Fernández Racing	Dallara	225.503	362.912
8	8	(United States) Scott Sharp	Delphi Fernández Racing	Dallara	225.321	362.619
9	26	(United States) Marco Andretti R	Andretti Green Racing	Dallara	224.918	361.970
10	16	(United States) Danica Patrick	Rahal Letterman Racing	Panoz	224.674	361.578
11	2	(South Africa) Tomas Scheckter	Vision Racing	Dallara	224.659	361.554
12	20	(United States) Ed Carpenter	Vision Racing	Dallara	224.548	361.375
13	1	(United States) Michael Andretti	Andretti Green Racing	Dallara	224.508	361.311
14	15	(United States) Buddy Rice W	Rahal Letterman Racing	Panoz	224.393	361.126
15	90	(United States) Townsend Bell R	Vision Racing	Dallara	224.374	361.095
16	7	(United States) Bryan Herta	Andretti Green Racing	Dallara	224.179	360.781
17	27	(United Kingdom) Dario Franchitti	Andretti Green Racing	Dallara	223.345	359.439
18	52	(Italy) Max Papis	Cheever Racing	Dallara	222.058	357.368
19	51	(United States) Eddie Cheever W	Cheever Racing	Dallara	222.028	357.319
20	91	(United States) P. J. Chesson R	Hemelgarn Racing	Dallara	221.576	356.592
21	14	(Brazil) Felipe Giaffone	A. J. Foyt Racing	Dallara	221.542	356.537
22	92	(United States) Jeff Bucknum	Hemelgarn Racing	Dallara	221.461	356.407
23	41	(United States) Larry Foyt	A. J. Foyt Racing	Dallara	221.332	356.199
24	21	(United States) Jaques Lazier	Playa Del Racing	Panoz	221.151	355.908
25	5	(United States) Buddy Lazier W	Dreyer & Reinbold Racing	Dallara	220.922	355.539
26	17	(United States) Jeff Simmons	Rahal Letterman Racing	Panoz	220.347	354.614
27	31	(United States) Al Unser Jr. W	Dreyer & Reinbold Racing	Dallara	219.388	353.071
28	12	(United States) Roger Yasukawa	Playa Del Racing	Panoz	218.793	352.113
29	88	(Brazil) Airton Daré	Sam Schmidt Motorsports	Panoz	218.170	351.111
30	97	(France) Stéphan Grégoire	Team Leader Motorsports	Panoz	217.428	349.916
31	61	(Netherlands) Arie Luyendyk Jr. R	Luyendyk Racing	Panoz	216.352	348.185
32	98	(United States) P. J. Jones	Team Leader Motorsports	Panoz	215.816	347.322
Did not qualify
33	18	(Brazil) Thiago Medeiros R	PDM Racing	Panoz	No time	
34	25	(Canada) Marty Roth	Roth Racing	Dallara	No time	

- W - Former Indianapolis 500 winner
- R - Indianapolis 500 rookie

=== Bump Day – Sunday May 21 ===
==== Pre-qualifying practice ====
Rock artist Scott Stapp waved the green flag at 10:15 AM local time to open the track for an hour-long practice session. Jaques Lazier was the fastest driver of the morning session, at 218.576 mph (351.764 km/h).

==== Qualifying ====
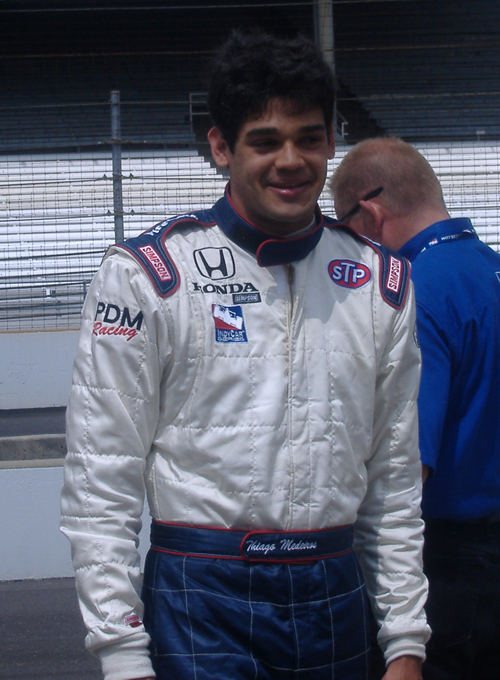
Thiago Medeiros took the final starting position on Sunday.

The qualifying session on Bump Day, which ran for six hours beginning at noon local time, was held in conjunction with a practice session for drivers who had already qualified for the race. Weather conditions during the session were again warm, with air temperatures reaching 70 °F (21 °C), though skies were mostly cloudy. Hornish Jr., driving his back-up car, led the speed charts with a fastest lap of 226.256 mph (364.124 km/h); however, not long after posting the fastest lap, Hornish Jr. crashed into the SAFER barrier exiting turn one.

At 5:08 PM local time, Medeiros, driving a car leased from Fernández Racing, took to the track for the first time since his crash on Thursday and completed his qualifying attempt with a four-lap average speed of 215.729 mph (347.182 km/h). The battle for the final spot in the Indianapolis 500 was seemingly about to intensify when driver Ryan Briscoe planned to make a qualifying attempt in the No. 48 car, prepared by A. J. Foyt Racing. However, with 23 minutes remaining, Roth slid into the outside SAFER barrier in turn one while making a practice run, ending his hopes of "bumping" his way into the Indianapolis 500. The resultant caution period also denied a chance for Briscoe to drive on the track and ultimately kept him out of the Indianapolis 500 as well. Roth and Briscoe's misfortunes ensured Medeiros the 33rd and final starting position of the race.

Pos	No.	Driver	Team	Chassis	Speed (mph)	Speed (km/h)
33	18	(Brazil) Thiago Medeiros R	PDM Racing	Panoz	215.729	347.182
Failed to Qualify
34	25	(Canada) Marty Roth	Roth Racing	Dallara	No time	

== Post-qualifying practice ==
=== Carb Day – Friday May 26 ===
Carb Day was the final day of practice before the Indianapolis 500. The hour-long session began at 11:00 AM local time. Hornish Jr. drove a lap at 220.698 mph (355.179 km/h), becoming the fastest driver of the day.

Top Speeds
Pos	No.	Driver	Team	Chassis	Speed (mph)	Speed (km/h)
1	6	(United States) Sam Hornish Jr.	Marlboro Team Penske	Dallara	220.698	355.179
2	8	(United States) Scott Sharp	Delphi Fernández Racing	Dallara	220.316	354.564
3	9	(New Zealand) Scott Dixon	Target Chip Ganassi Racing	Dallara	219.992	354.043

== Pit Stop Challenge ==
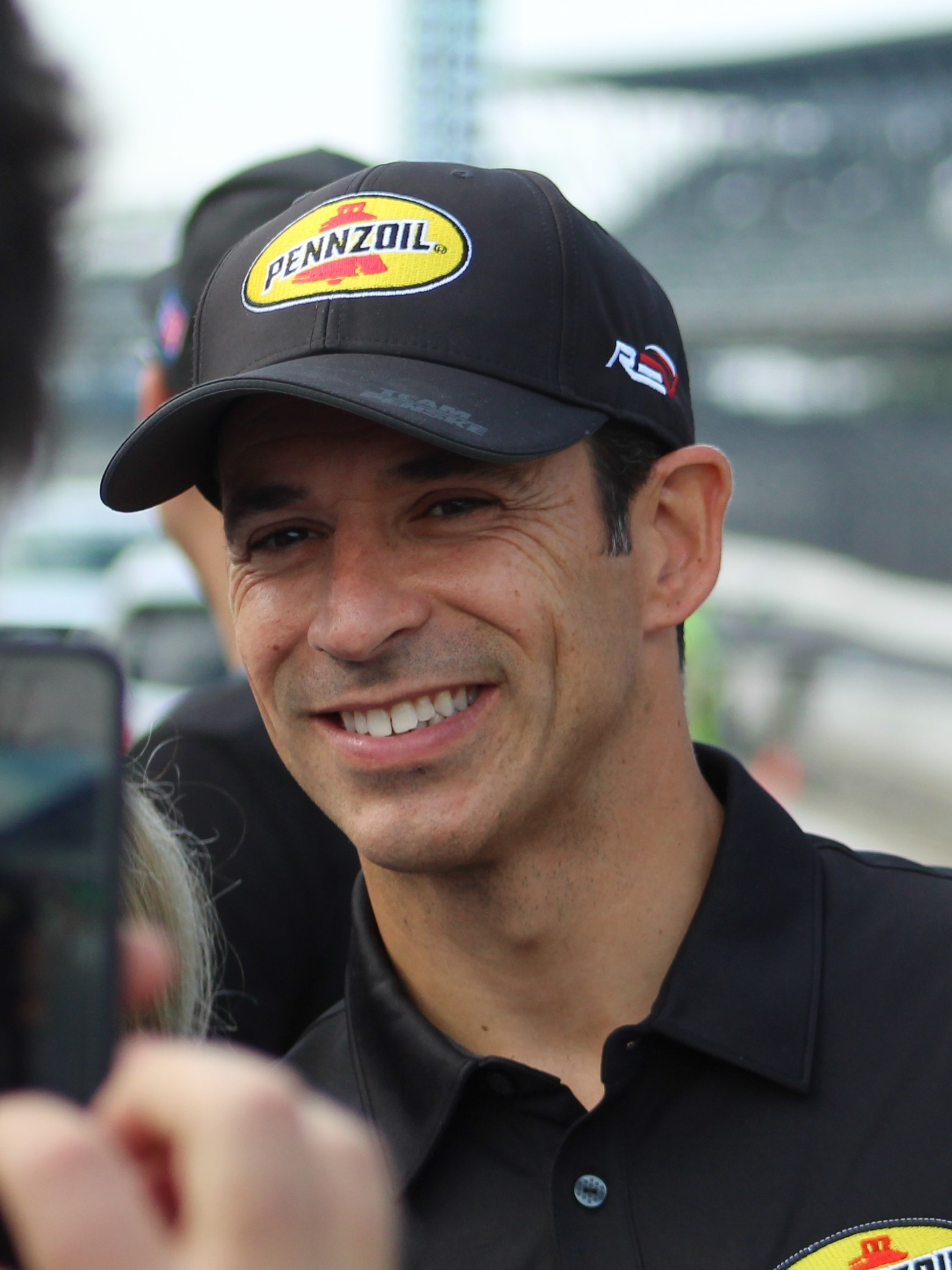
Hélio Castroneves (pictured in 2018) won the Pit Stop Challenge.

The 30th annual Checkers/Rally's Pit Stop Challenge was held on Friday, May 26, after the completion of the Freedom 100. The ten participating teams were announced three days prior, along with a new format for the event. All ten teams would complete a simulated pit stop during the qualification round; the two fastest teams would automatically advance to the semifinals round, the third- through sixth-fastest teams would advance to the quarterfinals, and the slowest four teams would be eliminated. The fastest two teams in the quarterfinals would then advance to the semifinals, where they would face off against the two fastest teams from qualifying. Finally, the top two teams from the semifinals would advance to the finals to determine the winner.

Castroneves was the fastest driver in qualifying; he and Franchitti, Hornish Jr., Rice, Dixon, and Kanaan advanced to the event, while Andretti, Wheldon, Bryan Herta, and Patrick were eliminated. With a final-round pit stop of 8.0852 seconds, Castroneves and Team Penske went on to win the Pit Stop Challenge and the $50,000 winner's purse, marking his second win in the event. Castroneves' semifinals pit stop, which timed in at 7.7365 seconds, was the fastest pit stop in the history of the Pit Stop Challenge.

Qualifying Round
Rank	Car no.	Driver	Team	Time (seconds)
1	3	Helio Castroneves	Marlboro Team Penske	8.6398
2	27	Dario Franchitti	Andretti Green Racing	8.7586
3	6	Sam Hornish Jr.	Marlboro Team Penske	8.9405
4	15	Buddy Rice	Rahal Letterman Racing	9.1060
5	9	Scott Dixon	Target Chip Ganassi Racing	9.5118
6	11	Tony Kanaan	Andretti Green Racing	9.5510
7	26	Marco Andretti	Andretti Green Racing	9.8859
8	10	Dan Wheldon	Target Chip Ganassi Racing	10.2462
9	7	Bryan Herta	Andretti Green Racing	9.9150
10	16	Danica Patrick	Rahal Letterman Racing	17.9074

Quarterfinals
Buddy Rice (Rahal Letterman)	9.7450
Scott Dixon (Chip Ganassi Racing)	12.2402
Tony Kanaan (Andretti Green Racing)	8.6719
Sam Hornish Jr. (Team Penske)	8.6923

Semifinals
Hélio Castroneves (Team Penske)	7.7365
Buddy Rice (Rahal Letterman)	9.2871
Dario Franchitti (Andretti Green Racing)	8.4471
Tony Kanaan (Andretti Green Racing)	11.7395

Final
Hélio Castroneves (Team Penske)	8.0852
Dario Franchitti (Andretti Green Racing)	8.4428

== Starting grid ==
Row	Inside		Middle		Outside	
1	6	(United States) Sam Hornish Jr.	3	(Brazil) Hélio Castroneves W	10	(United Kingdom) Dan Wheldon W
2	9	(New Zealand) Scott Dixon	11	(Brazil) Tony Kanaan	4	(Brazil) Vítor Meira
3	55	(Japan) Kosuke Matsuura	8	(United States) Scott Sharp	26	(United States) Marco Andretti R
4	16	(United States) Danica Patrick	2	(South Africa) Tomas Scheckter	20	(United States) Ed Carpenter
5	1	(United States) Michael Andretti	15	(United States) Buddy Rice W	90	(United States) Townsend Bell R
6	7	(United States) Bryan Herta	27	(United Kingdom) Dario Franchitti	52	(Italy) Max Papis
7	51	(United States) Eddie Cheever W	91	(United States) P. J. Chesson R	14	(Brazil) Felipe Giaffone
8	92	(United States) Jeff Bucknum	41	(United States) Larry Foyt	21	(United States) Jaques Lazier
9	5	(United States) Buddy Lazier W	17	(United States) Jeff Simmons	31	(United States) Al Unser Jr. W
10	12	(United States) Roger Yasukawa	88	(Brazil) Airton Daré	97	(France) Stéphan Grégoire
11	61	(Netherlands) Arie Luyendyk Jr. R	98	(United States) P. J. Jones	18	(Brazil) Thiago Medeiros R

- W - Former Indianapolis 500 winner
- R - Indianapolis 500 rookie

Failed to qualify

No.	Driver	Team	Reason	Ref
25	(Canada) Marty Roth	Roth Racing	Crashed in practice and did not attempt to qualify on Bump Day.	

== Race report ==
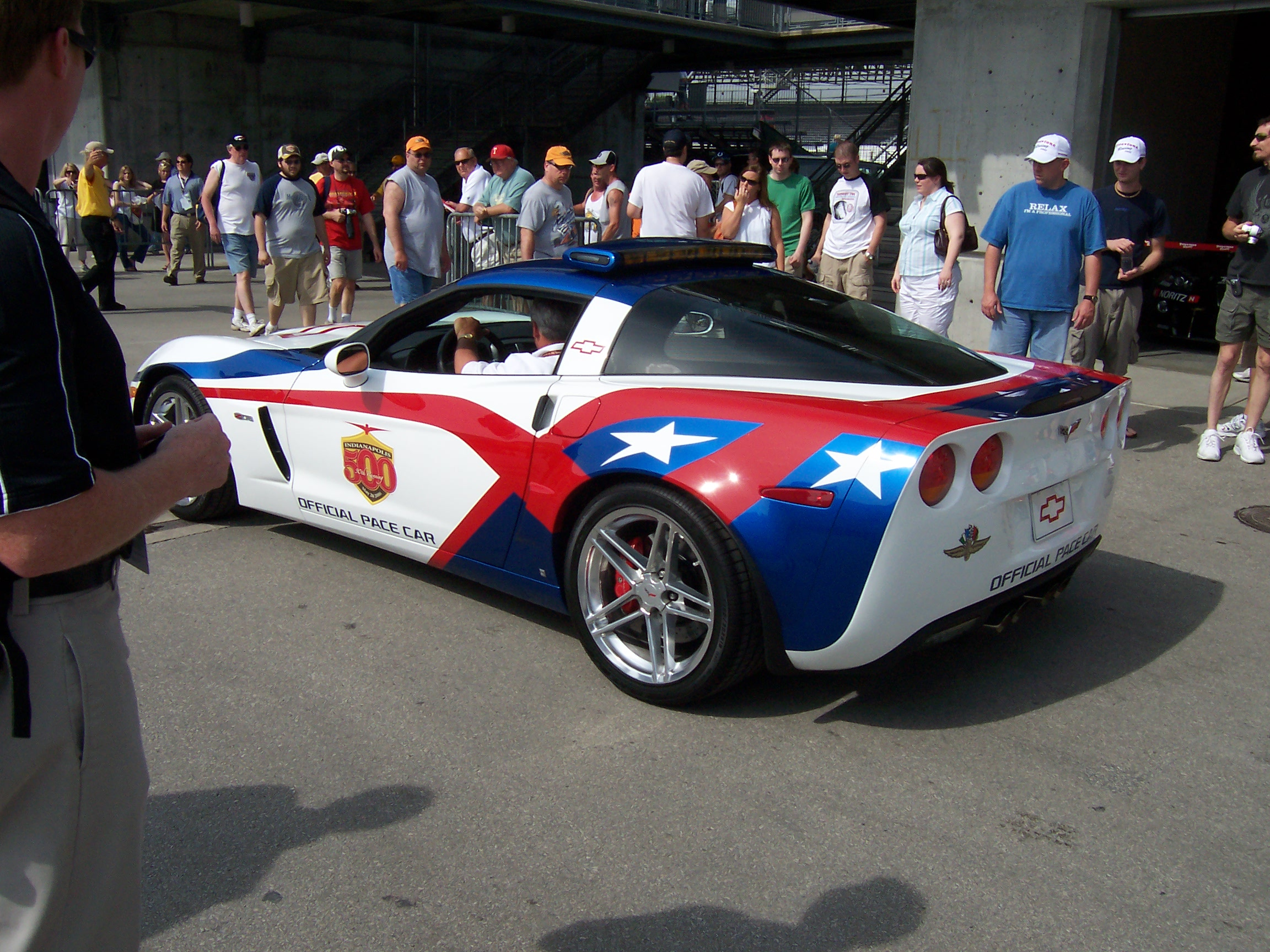
The pace car (pictured above) which Lance Armstrong drove at the beginning of the Indianapolis 500.

After a considerable amount of rain throughout the month of May, race day for the Indianapolis 500 was sunny and quite hot. Ambient temperatures topped out at 89 °F (32 °C), making this the fourth-hottest running of the event on record (at the time). It was later reported that 225 fans sought relief from first-aid stations during the race due to heat exhaustion. Track temperatures were also measured in between 120 and 126 °F (49 and 52 °C). The race began at 1:11 PM local time; Lance Armstrong drove the pace car, while Sugar Ray Leonard was given the honors of being the honorary starter and waved the green flag to begin the Indianapolis 500.

=== First half ===
All 33 drivers began the race in rows of three, and Castroneves pulled ahead of pole sitter Hornish Jr. entering the first turn. Hornish Jr. would eventually fall to the third position behind Wheldon, who was 0.1285 seconds behind Castroneves by the end of the opening lap. The first yellow flag of the race was issued on the second lap, when Bucknum lost control of his car in turn two and spun, unintentionally collecting his teammate Chesson in the process. Both drivers slammed the outside wall and retired from the race, though neither driver was injured. Castroneves continued to lead the race during the first rolling restart on lap 7, though he was overtaken by Wheldon three laps later. As Castroneves was relegated outside the top five positions, Wheldon led 25 consecutive laps.

On lap 23, Medeiros and P. J. Jones entered pit road, marking the beginning of green-flag pit stops. A lap later, Medeiros became the third retiree of the race, suffering from electrical issues. Wheldon elected to stay out until lap 35, giving up the lead to Hornish Jr. for three laps and Kanaan for one lap before regaining the lead on lap 39. After pit stops ended, a long period of green-flag racing ensued; Wheldon used this period to his advantage, lengthening his lead over Dixon (who passed Hornish Jr. for the second position on lap 65) to 20.6733 seconds. Foyt, Stéphan Grégoire, and Luyendyk Jr., all of whom struggled with handling issues, retired from the race on the 43rd, 49th, and 54th laps, respectively. The yellow flag would not fly again until lap 67, when Tomas Scheckter's car broke loose exiting the fourth turn and backed into the outside SAFER barrier. Scheckter then slammed into the attenuator on pit lane. Moments after the crash, Jaques Lazier ran over Scheckter's rear wing and sent it high in the air and into the grandstands behind pit lane. Five fans were injured in the incident, though none received serious injuries. Racing resumed on lap 76, and Wheldon preserved his lead after he and many other drivers entered pit road for four tires and fuel.

=== Second half ===
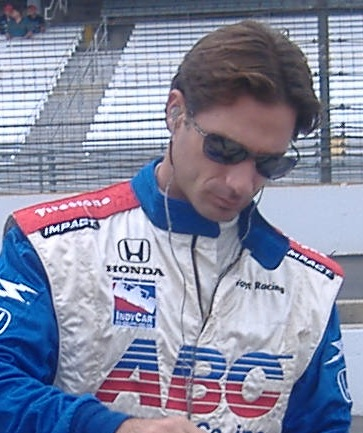
Felipe Giaffone (pictured on Carb Day in 2006) crashed out of the race on lap 177.

Race leader Wheldon was again one of the last drivers to pit during the second round of green-flag pit stops, which commenced on lap 91. Wheldon finally pitted on the 108th lap; Dixon inherited the lead for the next three laps before Wheldon utilized his slipstream to overtake him on lap 111. The second caution was necessitated that same lap, when Castroneves collided with Rice in the third turn, sending both drivers hard into the SAFER barrier. While neither driver was injured, Castroneves' retirement marked the first time in his career that he would fail to finish the Indianapolis 500. Two laps after the restart on lap 123, Dixon moved past Wheldon for the race lead in the first turn. Wheldon briefly fell back to third before fighting his way back and passing Dixon in turn three on lap 128. Wheldon only led two laps before Hornish Jr. made his way up to the lead in turn one. With Wheldon in hot pursuit, Hornish Jr. held onto the lead for the next 15 laps before Wheldon finally got by him in turn three.

On lap 149, Unser Jr. precipitated the fourth caution period of the race after spinning down the back-stretch and crashing in the third turn. During the caution, problems arose for a handful of teams. Simmons left his pit stall with the fuel hose nozzle still attached. The hose tore, and Simmons' car dropped the nozzle out on the track in turn three. Hornish Jr. also attempted to exit his pit stall with his fuel hose attached, only he struck a crew member in the process; as a result, he was issued a drive-through penalty. Meanwhile, Simmons, driving with cold tires, had only worsened his day as he crashed into the SAFER barrier in the third and fourth corners on lap 155, ending his race. The caution period was prolonged as a result of Simmons' wreck. Five laps later, Hornish Jr. and Michael Andretti ducked into pit road for their final fueling of the race as part of their strategy to be in position to win by the end.

As Wheldon led the drivers back to green-flag racing on the 162nd lap, Hornish Jr. assessed his penalty, though his left-rear tire was hit from behind by Bell, who was penalized for the same reason as Hornish Jr. Bell also hit a cone and received damage to his suspension, forcing him to retire, while Hornish Jr. rejoined the track nearly thirty seconds behind Wheldon. Wheldon's teammate Dixon was also handed a drive-through penalty on lap 175 for what officials deemed to be an "aggressive" block on Kanaan, who passed him for the second position. The penalty shunned Dixon out of contention for the win. In the meantime, the battle for the lead had intensified with twenty laps to go, as Kanaan diminished his gap behind Wheldon by a significant amount. On lap 183, Wheldon approached on the lapped car of Matsuura and was momentarily blocked, giving Kanaan the opportunity to dart to the lead on the inside line. Wheldon made an effort to take back the lead in the third turn, but as he and Kanaan got by the slower car of Max Papis, he slid up into the marbles in turn four and punctured a tire. A lap later, Wheldon made an unscheduled pit stop to alleviate his tire issues.

Many of the highest-running drivers, including second-place Marco Andretti, came into pit road for their final stop as the laps wound down. Felipe Giaffone, who had been struggling with his car the entire race, drove up the track in the second turn to avoid colliding with race leader Kanaan. However, Giaffone drifted into the marbles and made contact with the outside SAFER barrier, damaging his right-front and rear suspensions; he became the thirteenth retiree of the race and permitted the yellow flag on lap 190. Once pit road was reopened on lap 193, teammates Kanaan and Franchitti surrendered their first and second positions, respectively, for a final load of fuel, which gave Michael Andretti the race lead. His son Marco legally slipped by the pace car exiting pit road, and was shifted up to the second position. Dixon was lined up third, and Hornish Jr. climbed up to fourth.

=== Finish ===
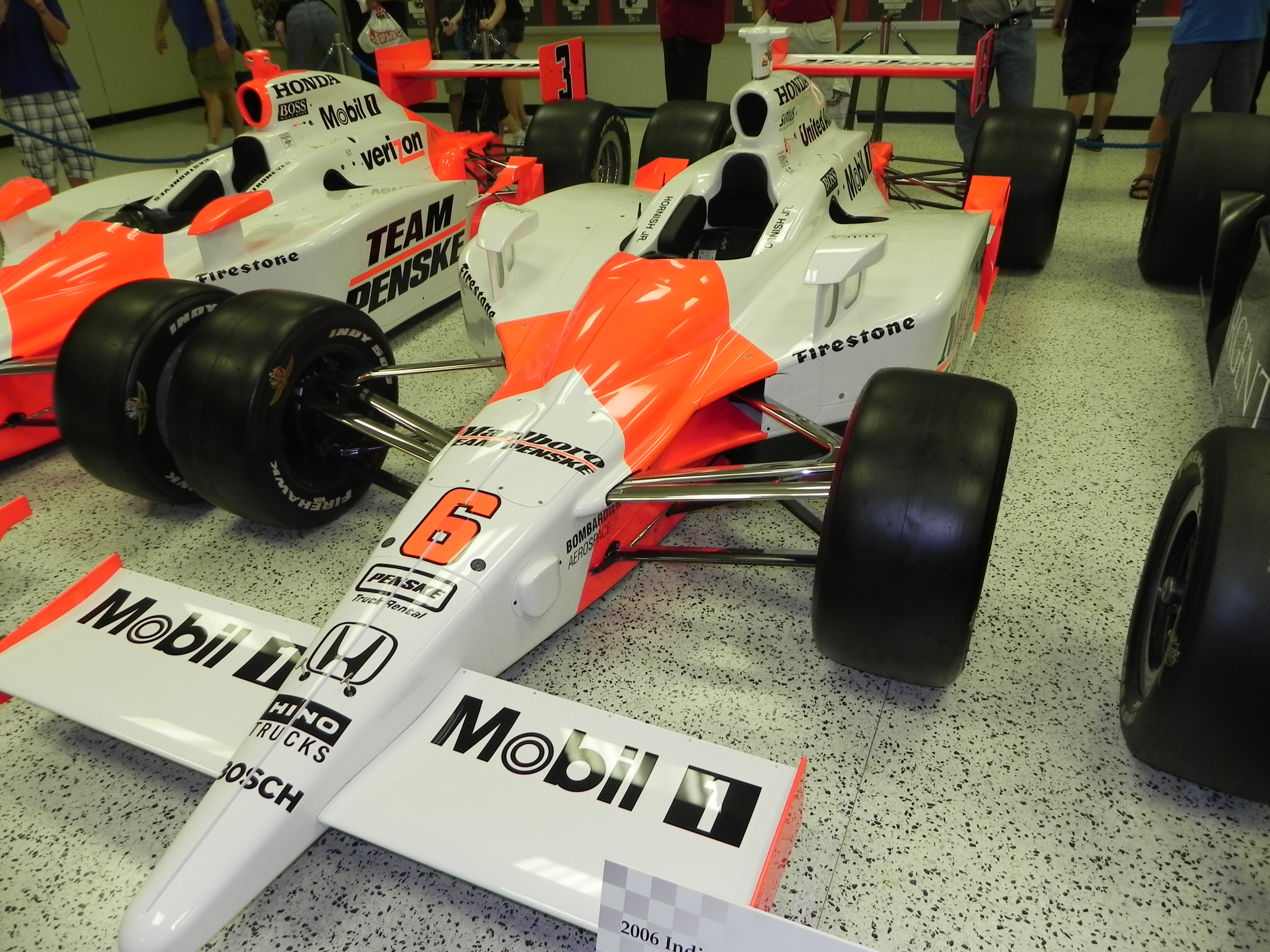
The car which Sam Hornish Jr. drove to the Indianapolis 500 victory.

The green flag waved again with four laps to go, and Hornish Jr. promptly passed Dixon in the first turn for third. Michael Andretti only led a single lap under green-flag conditions before Marco drove to the outside lane and pulled ahead of his father in turn one on lap 198. With Herta running behind the Andretti duo, he was placed with the responsibility of blocking Hornish Jr.; however, Herta was no match for the hard-charging Hornish Jr., who easily breezed by him on the front-stretch as Marco made his pass on his father. Exiting turn two, Michael tried to block Hornish Jr. and protect his son's lead, though to no avail.

Marco led Hornish Jr. by just over half a second on lap 199. Hornish Jr. was able to cut down Marco's gap by catching his slipstream down the backstretch. He made a move to the inside line entering turn three, but was forced to back off after Marco blocked him and nearly sent him off the racing surface. Marco took the white flag with a seemingly insurmountable 0.9454-second gap over Hornish Jr.. Marco continued holding his lead down the back-stretch, but by the time the two leaders reached turn four, Hornish Jr. began to reel him in. Marco made a last-ditch effort to preserve his lead by blocking Hornish Jr. on the outside lane. Hornish Jr. then charged to the inside and executed a slingshot pass in the final 450 feet (140 metres). He beat Marco Andretti to the finish line by 0.0635 seconds, the equivalent of about 15 feet (4.6 metres), to earn his first Indianapolis 500 victory. The gap between Hornish Jr. and Marco Andretti was the second-closest margin of victory in Indianapolis 500 history (at the time); as of 2026, it is the fourth-closest finish. It was also the first time in race history that a driver completed a pass for the lead on the final lap to win the race.

Michael Andretti, in his fifteenth attempt to win the Indianapolis 500, finished third in what was his second-best finish in the race. Wheldon, who led a race-high 148 laps, failed to defend his victory in 2005, though he finished a respectable fourth. Kanaan passed two competitors on the final restart to take a fifth-place finish. Dixon, Franchitti, Patrick, Sharp, and Vítor Meira rounded out the top ten. Ed Carpenter, Buddy Lazier, Cheever, Papis, Matsuura, Roger Yasukawa, Jaques Lazier, Airton Daré, Jones, and Herta were the final classified finishers. Five caution periods slowed the race for 44 laps, and the lead was traded fourteen times amongst seven different drivers.

=== Post-race ===
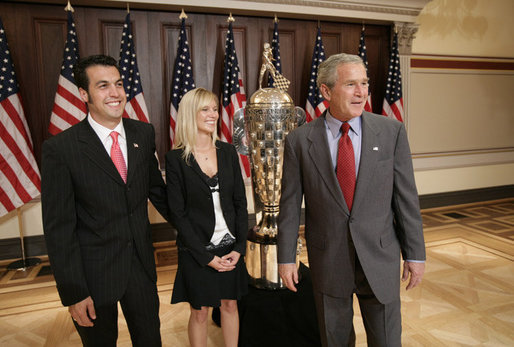
President George W. Bush meeting with Sam Hornish Jr. and his wife, Crystal, on July 18.

Hornish Jr. celebrated his win with his team in victory lane; he earned the Borg-Warner Trophy and collected winnings of $1,744,855 from a record purse of $10,518,565. Hornish Jr. reflected on the challenges he faced during the race and how he overcame them: "It's been a long month, and not everything went our way as we saw today. But we stuck together as a team. We had a good plan, and we were fast when we needed. I thank God for giving me a lot of talent, not so much the fact for what I can do driving but the fact that I didn't want to give up. And then He also put me with such a great team and gave me great parents and a great wife to support me very much." During a subsequent press conference Hornish Jr. explained that his sudden surge in speed while approaching the finish likely came from his heavy usage of fuel on the final lap. Team owner Roger Penske, who earned his fourteenth Indianapolis 500 win, compared Hornish Jr. to four-time Indianapolis 500 winner Rick Mears and admitted he was at fault for Hornish Jr.'s miscue on pit road. On July 18, Hornish Jr. and Penske were invited to the White House by president George W. Bush, who congratulated Hornish Jr. for the win and praised IndyCar's usage of ethanol fuel.

Second-place finisher Marco Andretti was proud of what he accomplished, but disappointed in the final result: "Like I said, it does feel awesome and, you know, I can't complain, I almost won the Indy 500 my first year in it. It's just the way as a competitor, I don't want to finish second. I don't want to wait until next year. I know I have a lot of shots at it, but I wish it was this year. Got to take advantage of every shot." Michael Andretti was also somewhat dejected, but praised his son for his performance during the race: "I felt so bad for Marco, but I'm so proud. He drove a hell of a race. I drove with him a hell of a lot in that race. He drove like a champion. He drove like he's been out there 10 years." Marco's grandfather Mario was equally as laudatory of his finish: "He matured so tremendously throughout the month. This is one event where you have time (to prepare) and Marco took full advantage to learn something new. He did his job. It was a very steep learning curve for him." Marco was named Rookie of the Year for the 2006 Indianapolis 500, though his close loss invoked memories of the supposed Andretti curse with journalists such as Jim Litke of Pittsburgh Post-Gazette and Mike Harris of Eugene Register-Guard.

None of the 33 cars in the race, which were all powered by Honda, encountered engine issues; it is believed to be the first time in Indianapolis 500 history that this has occurred. Robert Clarke, president of Honda Performance Development, commented on this feat: "It's an amazing accomplishment for everyone at Honda Performance Development and our technical partner at Ilmor. I'm both extremely proud of the result and grateful for the incredible effort put forth by all of our associates leading up to today's race. Congratulations to Sam [Hornish] and Roger [Penske] for a great ‘500'. Their team fought back from adversity and gave us a thrilling finish today." This was also the final Indianapolis 500 for public address announcer Tom Carnegie, who had commentated every edition of the event since 1946. Carnegie cited health issues, particularly related to his legs, as the reason for his retirement, which he announced on June 9.

The finishing order of the race shrunk Castroneves' Drivers' Championship lead to 12 points behind Hornish Jr., while Wheldon fell from second to third in the championship standings. Dixon and Kanaan maintained their fourth and fifth positions, respectively.

== Box score ==
Pos.	No.	Driver	Team	Chassis	Engine	Laps	Status	Grid	Pts.
1	6	(United States) Sam Hornish Jr.	Marlboro Team Penske	Dallara IR-03	Honda Indy V8	200	157.085 mph	1	50
2	26	(United States) Marco Andretti R	Andretti Green Racing	Dallara IR-03	Honda Indy V8	200	+0.0635	9	40
3	1	(United States) Michael Andretti	Andretti Green Racing	Dallara IR-03	Honda Indy V8	200	+1.0087	13	35
4	10	(United Kingdom) Dan Wheldon W	Target Chip Ganassi Racing	Dallara IR-03	Honda Indy V8	200	+1.2692	3	35^{1}
5	11	(Brazil) Tony Kanaan	Andretti Green Racing	Dallara IR-03	Honda Indy V8	200	+1.6456	5	30
6	9	(New Zealand) Scott Dixon	Target Chip Ganassi Racing	Dallara IR-03	Honda Indy V8	200	+3.0566	4	28
7	27	(United Kingdom) Dario Franchitti	Andretti Green Racing	Dallara IR-03	Honda Indy V8	200	+5.6249	17	26
8	16	(United States) Danica Patrick	Rahal Letterman Racing	G-Force GF09	Honda Indy V8	200	+5.7263	10	24
9	8	(United States) Scott Sharp	Delphi Fernández Racing	Dallara IR-03	Honda Indy V8	200	+11.1252	8	22
10	4	(Brazil) Vítor Meira	Panther Racing	Dallara IR-03	Honda Indy V8	200	+17.9554	6	20
11	20	(United States) Ed Carpenter	Vision Racing	Dallara IR-03	Honda Indy V8	199	-1 lap	12	19
12	5	(United States) Buddy Lazier W	Dreyer & Reinbold Racing	Dallara IR-03	Honda Indy V8	199	-1 lap	25	18
13	51	(United States) Eddie Cheever W	Cheever Racing	Dallara IR-03	Honda Indy V8	198	-2 laps	19	17
14	52	(Italy) Max Papis	Cheever Racing	Dallara IR-03	Honda Indy V8	197	-3 laps	18	16
15	55	(Japan) Kosuke Matsuura	Super Aguri Fernández Racing	Dallara IR-03	Honda Indy V8	196	-4 laps	7	15
16	12	(United States) Roger Yasukawa	Playa Del Racing	G-Force GF09	Honda Indy V8	194	-6 laps	28	14
17	21	(United States) Jaques Lazier	Playa Del Racing	G-Force GF09	Honda Indy V8	193	-7 laps	24	13
18	88	(Brazil) Airton Daré	Sam Schmidt Motorsports	G-Force GF09	Honda Indy V8	193	-7 laps	29	12
19	98	(United States) P. J. Jones	Team Leader Motorsports	G-Force GF09	Honda Indy V8	189	-11 laps	32	12
20	7	(United States) Bryan Herta	Andretti Green Racing	Dallara IR-03	Honda Indy V8	188	-12 laps	16	12
21	14	(Brazil) Felipe Giaffone	A. J. Foyt Racing	Dallara IR-03	Honda Indy V8	177	Accident	21	12
22	90	(United States) Townsend Bell R	Vision Racing	Dallara IR-03	Honda Indy V8	161	Suspension	15	12
23	17	(United States) Jeff Simmons	Rahal Letterman Racing	G-Force GF09	Honda Indy V8	152	Accident	26	12
24	31	(United States) Al Unser Jr. W	Dreyer & Reinbold Racing	Dallara IR-03	Honda Indy V8	145	Accident	27	12
25	3	(Brazil) Hélio Castroneves W	Marlboro Team Penske	Dallara IR-03	Honda Indy V8	109	Accident	2	10
26	15	(United States) Buddy Rice W	Rahal Letterman Racing	G-Force GF09	Honda Indy V8	108	Accident	14	10
27	2	(South Africa) Tomas Scheckter	Vision Racing	Dallara IR-03	Honda Indy V8	65	Accident	11	10
28	61	(Netherlands) Arie Luyendyk Jr. R	Luyendyk Racing	G-Force GF09	Honda Indy V8	54	Handling	31	10
29	97	(France) Stéphan Grégoire	Team Leader Motorsports	G-Force GF09	Honda Indy V8	49	Handling	30	10
30	41	(United States) Larry Foyt	A. J. Foyt Racing	Dallara IR-03	Honda Indy V8	43	Handling	23	10
31	18	(Brazil) Thiago Medeiros R	PDM Racing	G-Force GF09	Honda Indy V8	24	Electrical	33	10
32	92	(United States) Jeff Bucknum	Hemelgarn Racing	Dallara IR-03	Honda Indy V8	1	Accident	22	10
33	91	(United States) P. J. Chesson R	Hemelgarn Racing	Dallara IR-03	Honda Indy V8	1	Accident	20	10

W Former Indianapolis 500 winner

R Indianapolis 500 Rookie

All entrants utilized Firestone tires.

- ^1 — Includes three bonus points for leading the most laps.

=== Race statistics ===
Lap leaders
Laps	Leader
1–9	Hélio Castroneves
10–34	Dan Wheldon
35–37	Sam Hornish Jr.
38	Tony Kanaan
39–107	Dan Wheldon
108–110	Scott Dixon
111–124	Dan Wheldon
125–127	Scott Dixon
128–129	Dan Wheldon
130–144	Sam Hornish Jr.
145–182	Dan Wheldon
183–193	Tony Kanaan
194–197	Michael Andretti
198–199	Marco Andretti
200	Sam Hornish Jr.

Total laps led
Driver	Laps
Dan Wheldon	148
Sam Hornish Jr.	19
Tony Kanaan	12
Hélio Castroneves	9
Scott Dixon	6
Michael Andretti	4
Marco Andretti	2

Cautions: 5 for 44 laps
Laps	Reason
2–6	Jeff Bucknum, P. J. Chesson crash in turn 2
67–75	Tomas Scheckter crash in turn 4
111–122	Buddy Rice, Hélio Castroneves crash in turn 4
149–161	Al Unser Jr. in turn 3; Jeff Simmons crash in northchute
191–195	Felipe Giaffone crash in turn 2

== Broadcasting ==
=== Television ===
The race was televised live in the United States on ABC Sports, except in Indianapolis on WRTV, where it was tape-delayed to primetime because the seats were not sold out. Veteran announcer Marty Reid served as the play-by-play commentator for the first time, while Scott Goodyear returned as driver analyst. Joining them in the booth was 1989 NASCAR Winston Cup Champion Rusty Wallace, who served as co-analyst with Goodyear. Brent Musburger took the role of hosting the race broadcast. Jack Arute, Vince Welch, Jerry Punch, and Jamie Little served as pit reporters.

Viewership for the event declined by 23.1% compared to the previous year's broadcast, with a 5.0 rating and a 14 share.

ABC Television (blacked out locally)
Booth announcers	Pit/garage reporters
Host: Brent Musburger; Announcer: Marty Reid; Color: Scott Goodyear; Color: Rusty Wallace	Jack Arute; Vince Welch; Dr. Jerry Punch; Jamie Little

=== Radio ===
The race was carried live on the Indianapolis Motor Speedway Radio Network. Mike King was the race's chief announcer. Davey Hamilton served as the race analyst, while Dave Wilson, Donald Davidson, and Chris Economaki served as color commentators.

Indy Racing Radio Network
Booth announcers	Turn reporters	Pit/garage reporters
Chief announcer: Mike King; Driver expert: Davey Hamilton; Historian: Donald Davidson; Color analyst: Dave Wilson; Commentary: Chris Economaki	Turn 1: Jerry Baker; Turn 2: Adam Alexander; Turn 3: Mark Jaynes; Turn 4: Chris Denari	Kevin Olson (pits/garages); Dave Argabright (north pits); Nicole Manske (center pits); Kevin Lee (south pits)

Previous race: 2006 Indy Japan 300	IndyCar Series; 2006 season	Next race: 2006 Watkins Glen Indy Grand Prix
Previous race: 2005 Indianapolis 500	Indianapolis 500	Next race: 2007 Indianapolis 500
