= List of American open-wheel car race wins by Scott Dixon =

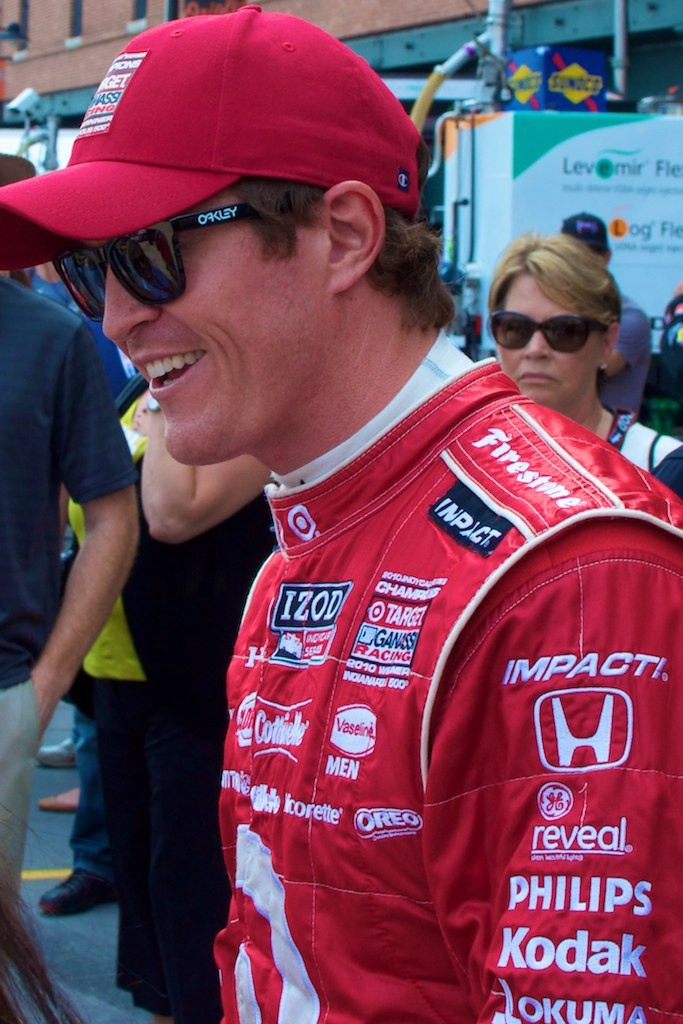
Scott Dixon (pictured in 2011) has won 59 American open-wheel car races.

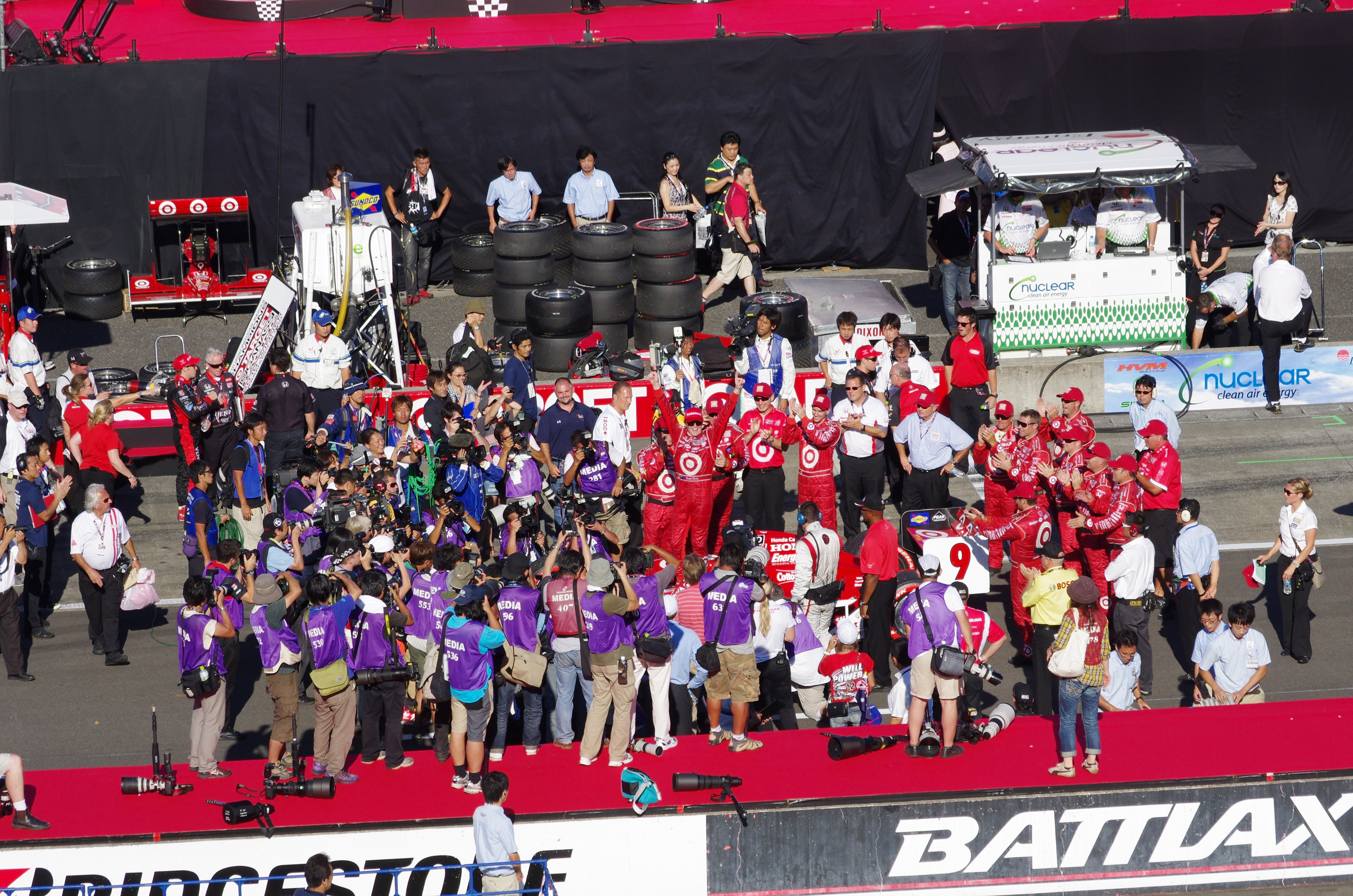
Dixon celebrating with his team after winning the 2011 Indy Japan: The Final at Twin Ring Motegi.

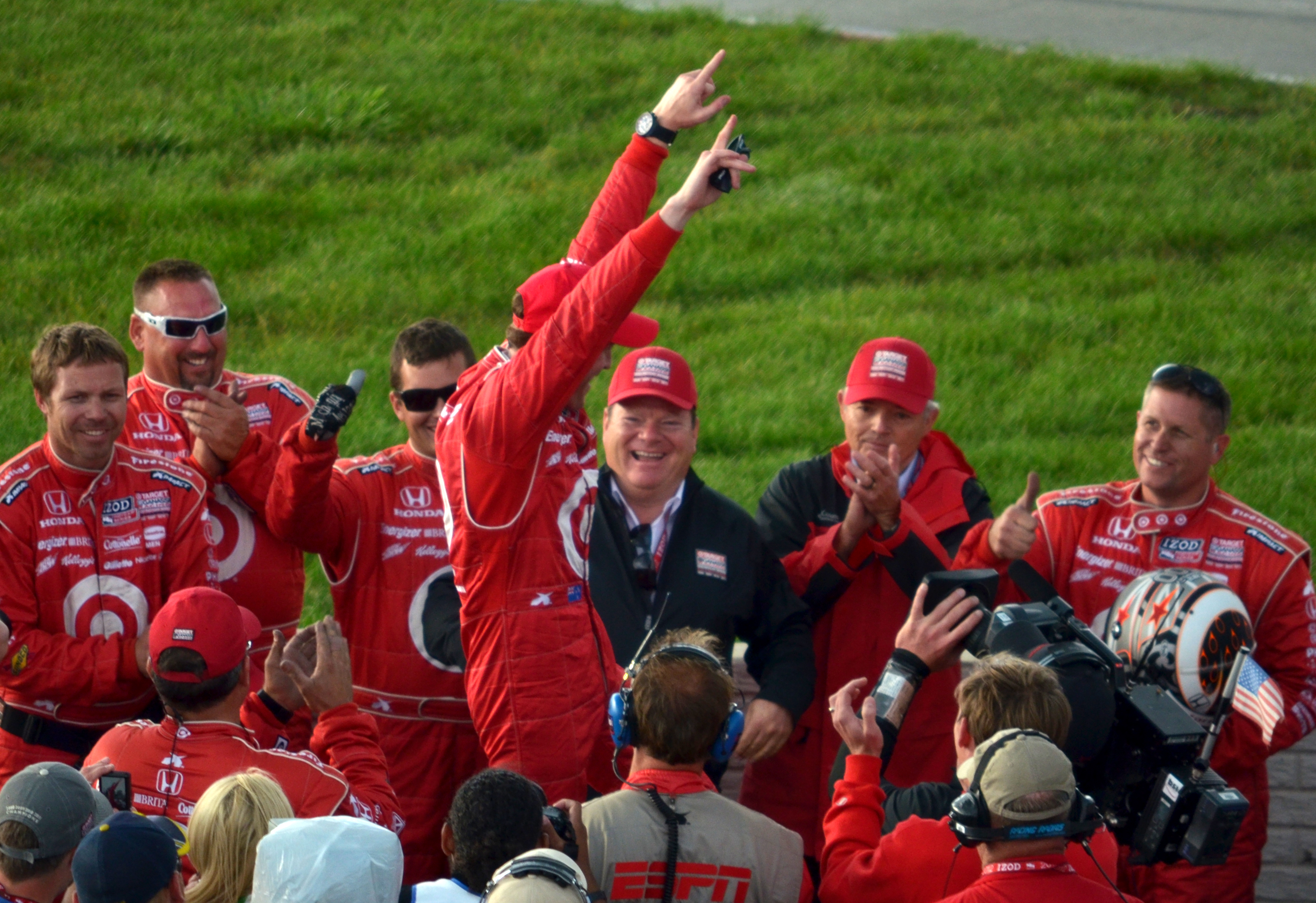
Dixon celebrating his win in the 2012 Chevrolet Detroit Belle Isle Grand Prix at the Raceway at Belle Isle Park.

Scott Dixon is a New Zealand racing driver who has competed in top-level American open-wheel car races since 2001, winning 59 races and six championships. After winning the Indy Lights title in 2000, Dixon advanced to the CART FedEx Championship Series the following year with PacWest Racing. In his debut at Fundidora Park on March 11, 2001, he led 13 laps and finished 13th. He earned his first career win two races later at Nazareth Speedway, becoming the youngest driver in history to win a CART-sanctioned race. Dixon was named the Rookie of the Year at the end of the 2001 season. In 2002, Dixon moved to Chip Ganassi Racing when PacWest Racing shut down three races into the season.

Dixon and Chip Ganassi Racing defected to the rivaling IRL IndyCar Series in 2003. He earned three wins that season, including his series debut at Homestead–Miami Speedway, and his first series title. Dixon went on to win the IndyCar Series championship again in 2008, 2013, 2015, 2018, and 2020. He also won the series' premier event, the Indianapolis 500, in 2008. As of the 2026 Sonsio Grand Prix, his 59 victories rank him second on the all-time wins list, only behind 67-time winner A. J. Foyt. Dixon also holds the record for the most starts (425), most consecutive starts (362), most seasons with a win (23), and most consecutive seasons with a win (21).

== Race wins ==
| No. | Date | Sanction | Season | Race | Track | Location | Ref. |
|---|---|---|---|---|---|---|---|
| 1 | May 6 | CART | 2001 | Lehigh Valley Grand Prix | Nazareth Speedway | Nazareth, Pennsylvania | |
| 2 | March 2 | IndyCar | 2003 | Toyota Indy 300 | Homestead–Miami Speedway | Homestead, Florida | |
| 3 | June 15 | IndyCar | 2003 | Honda Indy 225 | Pikes Peak International Raceway | Fountain, Colorado | |
| 4 | June 28 | IndyCar | 2003 | SunTrust Indy Challenge | Richmond International Raceway | Richmond, Virginia | |
| 5 | September 25 | IndyCar | 2005 | Watkins Glen Indy Grand Prix | Watkins Glen International | Watkins Glen, New York | |
| 6 | June 4 | IndyCar | 2006 | Watkins Glen Indy Grand Prix | Watkins Glen International | Watkins Glen, New York | |
| 7 | July 15 | IndyCar | 2006 | Firestone Indy 200 | Nashville Superspeedway | Lebanon, Tennessee | |
| 8 | July 8 | IndyCar | 2007 | Camping World Watkins Glen Grand Prix | Watkins Glen International | Watkins Glen, New York | |
| 9 | July 15 | IndyCar | 2007 | Firestone Indy 200 | Nashville Superspeedway | Lebanon, Tennessee | |
| 10 | July 22 | IndyCar | 2007 | Honda 200 | Mid-Ohio Sports Car Course | Lexington, Ohio | |
| 11 | August 26 | IndyCar | 2007 | Motorola Indy 300 | Infineon Raceway | Sonoma, California | |
| 12 | March 29 | IndyCar | 2008 | Gainsco Auto Insurance Indy 300 | Homestead–Miami Speedway | Homestead, Florida | |
| 13 | May 25 | IndyCar | 2008 | Indianapolis 500 | Indianapolis Motor Speedway | Speedway, Indiana | |
| 14 | June 7 | IndyCar | 2008 | Bombardier Learjet 550 | Texas Motor Speedway | Fort Worth, Texas | |
| 15 | July 12 | IndyCar | 2008 | Firestone Indy 200 | Nashville Superspeedway | Lebanon, Tennessee | |
| 16 | July 26 | IndyCar | 2008 | Rexall Edmonton Indy | Edmonton City Centre Airport | Edmonton, Canada | |
| 17 | August 9 | IndyCar | 2008 | Meijer Indy 300 | Kentucky Speedway | Sparta, Kentucky | |
| 18 | April 26 | IndyCar | 2009 | RoadRunner Turbo Indy 300 | Kansas Speedway | Kansas City, Kansas | |
| 19 | May 31 | IndyCar | 2009 | ABC Supply Company A.J. Foyt 225 | Milwaukee Mile | West Allis, Wisconsin | |
| 20 | June 27 | IndyCar | 2009 | SunTrust Indy Challenge | Richmond International Raceway | Richmond, Virginia | |
| 21 | August 9 | IndyCar | 2009 | Honda 200 | Mid-Ohio Sports Car Course | Lexington, Ohio | |
| 22 | September 18 | IndyCar | 2009 | Indy Japan 300 | Twin Ring Motegi | Motegi, Japan | |
| 23 | May 1 | IndyCar | 2010 | RoadRunner Turbo Indy 300 | Kansas Speedway | Kansas City, Kansas | |
| 24 | July 25 | IndyCar | 2010 | Honda Indy Edmonton | Edmonton City Centre Airport | Edmonton, Canada | |
| 25 | October 2 | IndyCar | 2010 | Cafés do Brasil Indy 300 | Homestead–Miami Speedway | Homestead, Florida | |
| 26 | August 9 | IndyCar | 2011 | Honda Indy 200 | Mid-Ohio Sports Car Course | Lexington, Ohio | |
| 27 | September 18 | IndyCar | 2011 | Indy Japan: The Final | Twin Ring Motegi | Motegi, Japan | |
| 28 | June 3 | IndyCar | 2012 | Chevrolet Detroit Belle Isle Grand Prix | Raceway at Belle Isle Park | Belle Isle Park, Michigan | |
| 29 | August 5 | IndyCar | 2012 | Honda Indy 200 | Mid-Ohio Sports Car Course | Lexington, Ohio | |
| 30 | July 7 | IndyCar | 2013 | Pocono IndyCar 400 | Pocono Raceway | Long Pond, Pennsylvania | |
| 31 | July 13 | IndyCar | 2013 | Honda Indy Toronto Race 1 | Exhibition Place | Toronto, Canada | |
| 32 | July 14 | IndyCar | 2013 | Honda Indy Toronto Race 2 | Exhibition Place | Toronto, Canada | |
| 33 | October 5 | IndyCar | 2013 | Shell-Pennzoil Grand Prix of Houston Race 1 | Reliant Park | Houston, Texas | |
| 34 | August 3 | IndyCar | 2014 | Honda Indy 200 | Mid-Ohio Sports Car Course | Lexington, Ohio | |
| 35 | August 24 | IndyCar | 2014 | GoPro Indy Grand Prix of Sonoma | Sonoma Raceway | Sonoma, California | |
| 36 | April 19 | IndyCar | 2015 | Toyota Grand Prix of Long Beach | Long Beach Street Circuit | Long Beach, California | |
| 37 | June 6 | IndyCar | 2015 | Firestone 600 | Texas Motor Speedway | Fort Worth, Texas | |
| 38 | August 30 | IndyCar | 2015 | GoPro Grand Prix of Sonoma | Sonoma Raceway | Sonoma, California | |
| 39 | April 2 | IndyCar | 2016 | Desert Diamond West Valley Phoenix Grand Prix | Phoenix International Raceway | Avondale, Arizona | |
| 40 | September 4 | IndyCar | 2016 | IndyCar Grand Prix at The Glen | Watkins Glen International | Watkins Glen, New York | |
| 41 | June 25 | IndyCar | 2017 | Kohler Grand Prix | Road America | Elkhart Lake, Wisconsin | |
| 42 | June 2 | IndyCar | 2018 | Chevrolet Detroit Grand Prix Race 1 | Raceway at Belle Isle Park | Belle Isle Park, Michigan | |
| 43 | June 9 | IndyCar | 2018 | DXC Technology 600 | Texas Motor Speedway | Fort Worth, Texas | |
| 44 | July 15 | IndyCar | 2018 | Honda Indy Toronto | Exhibition Place | Toronto, Canada | |
| 45 | June 2 | IndyCar | 2019 | Chevrolet Detroit Grand Prix Race 2 | Raceway at Belle Isle Park | Belle Isle Park, Michigan | |
| 46 | July 28 | IndyCar | 2019 | Honda Indy 200 | Mid-Ohio Sports Car Course | Lexington, Ohio | |
| 47 | June 6 | IndyCar | 2020 | Genesys 300 | Texas Motor Speedway | Fort Worth, Texas | |
| 48 | July 4 | IndyCar | 2020 | GMR Grand Prix | Indianapolis Motor Speedway | Speedway, Indiana | |
| 49 | July 11 | IndyCar | 2020 | REV Group Grand Prix Race 1 | Road America | Elkhart Lake, Wisconsin | |
| 50 | August 29 | IndyCar | 2020 | Bommarito Automotive Group 500 Race 1 | World Wide Technology Raceway | Madison, Illinois | |
| 51 | May 1 | IndyCar | 2021 | Genesys 300 | Texas Motor Speedway | Fort Worth, Texas | |
| 52 | July 17 | IndyCar | 2022 | Honda Indy Toronto | Exhibition Place | Toronto, Canada | |
| 53 | August 7 | IndyCar | 2022 | Big Machine Music City Grand Prix | Nashville Street Circuit | Nashville, Tennessee | |
| 54 | August 12 | IndyCar | 2023 | Gallagher Grand Prix | Indianapolis Motor Speedway | Speedway, Indiana | |
| 55 | August 27 | IndyCar | 2023 | Bommarito Automotive Group 500 | World Wide Technology Raceway | Madison, Illinois | |
| 56 | September 10 | IndyCar | 2023 | Firestone Grand Prix of Monterey | Laguna Seca | Monterey, California | |
| 57 | April 21 | IndyCar | 2024 | Acura Grand Prix of Long Beach | Long Beach Street Circuit | Long Beach, California | |
| 58 | June 2 | IndyCar | 2024 | Chevrolet Detroit Grand Prix | Detroit Street Circuit | Detroit, Michigan | |
| 59 | July 6 | IndyCar | 2025 | Honda Indy 200 | Mid-Ohio Sports Car Course | Lexington, Ohio | |

== See also ==
- List of American Championship Car winners
