= 2006 Watkins Glen Indy Grand Prix =

Open-wheel race held in Watkins Glen, New York

(United States) 2006 Watkins Glen Indy Grand Prix
Race details
Race 5 of 14 in the 2006 IndyCar Series season
← Previous race	Next race →
- Layout of the Watkins Glen International circuit
- Date: June 4, 2006
- Official name: Watkins Glen Indy Grand Prix presented by Tissot
- Location: Watkins Glen International, Watkins Glen, New York
- Course: Permanent racing facility 3.370 mi / 5.423 km
- Distance: 55 laps 185.350 mi / 298.292 km
- Scheduled Distance: 60 laps 202.200 mi / 325.409 km
- Weather: Rainy

Pole position
- Driver: (Brazil) Hélio Castroneves (Team Penske)
- Time: No time

Fastest lap
- Driver: (United States) Marco Andretti (Andretti Green Racing)
- Time: 1:34.8752 (on lap 38 of 55)

Podium
- First: (New Zealand) Scott Dixon (Chip Ganassi Racing)
- Second: (Brazil) Vítor Meira (Panther Racing)
- Third: (Australia) Ryan Briscoe (Dreyer & Reinbold Racing)

Chronology
Previous	Next
2005	2007

The 2006 Watkins Glen Indy Grand Prix presented by Tissot was an IRL IndyCar Series open-wheel race that was held on June 4, 2006, in Watkins Glen, New York at Watkins Glen International. It was the fifth round of the 2006 IRL IndyCar Series and the second running of the event. Chip Ganassi Racing driver Scott Dixon won the 55-lap race, shortened from the scheduled 60 laps due to rain. Vítor Meira finished second for Panther Racing, and Dreyer & Reinbold Racing driver Ryan Briscoe finished third.

Hélio Castroneves was awarded the pole position after qualifications were rained out. He was quickly passed for the lead by Tony Kanaan, who led the first eight laps until he, along with most other drivers, swapped out their rain tires for racing slicks. Jeff Simmons led a lap before Tomas Scheckter, who was the first driver to change to slick tires, passed him and commanded the race for twelve laps. Eventually, Scheckter was forced to pit for new tires, and he conceded the lead to Dan Wheldon. Wheldon led a race-high 13 laps prior to pitting and giving up the lead to Castroneves, who led seven consecutive laps until a poor pit stop kept him out of contention for the win. In the meantime, Buddy Rice stayed on track and assumed the lead, but was overtaken by Dixon after leading five laps. After the race was limited to a two-hour duration, many drivers chose to utilize rain tires, while Dixon elected to remain with his slick tires. His risky gamble paid off, and he led the final nine laps en route to his fifth IndyCar Series victory and the final win for Panoz as a chassis constructor.

Six caution flags were flown during the race, and the lead was changed six times among seven drivers. The final result moved Dixon from fourth to second in the Drivers' Championship, only behind Castroneves. Sam Hornish Jr. and Wheldon both finished poorly and lost one position each in the standings, while Kanaan maintained his fifth position.

== Background ==
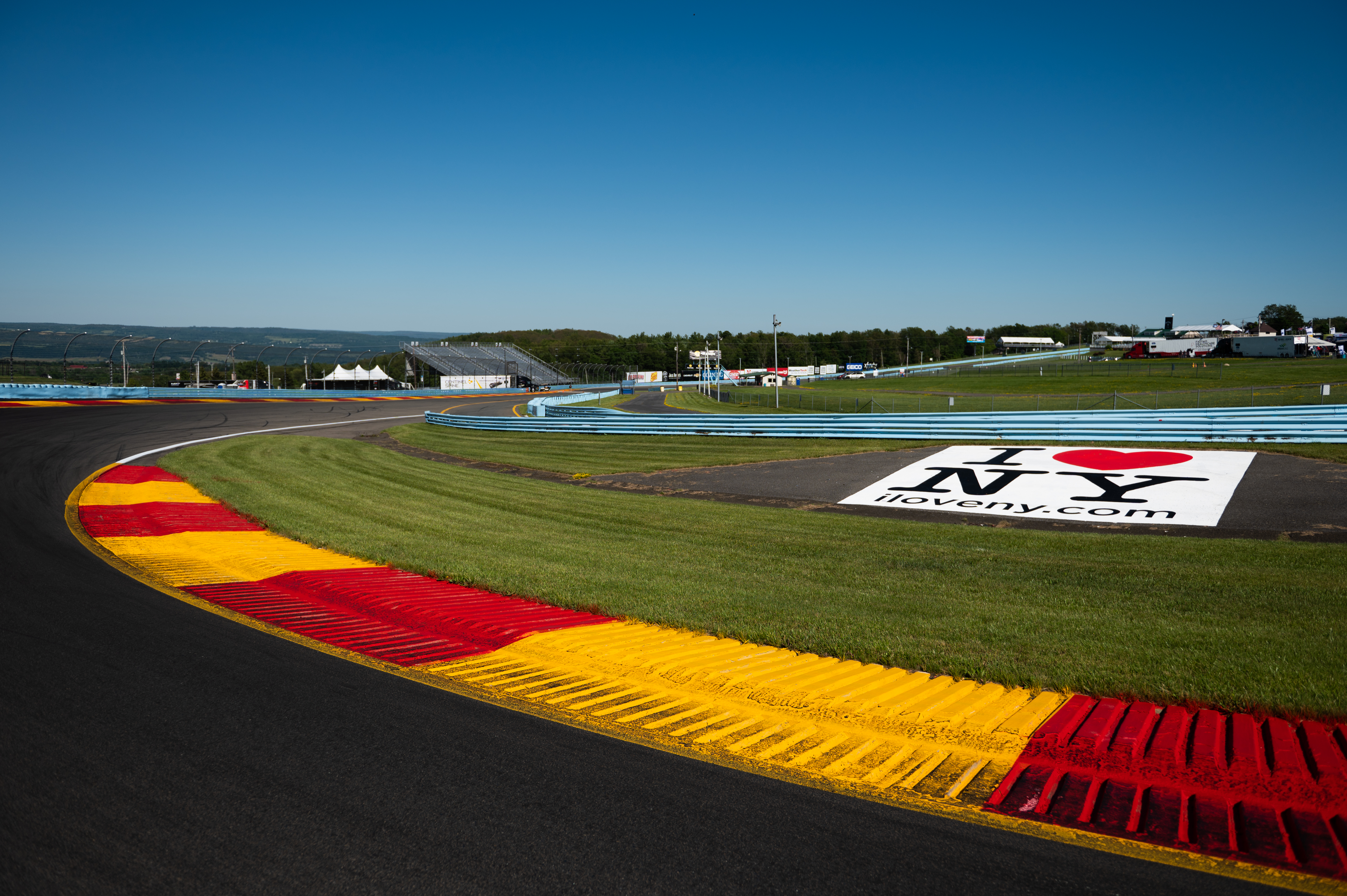
Watkins Glen International (pictured in 2021), where the race was held.

The Watkins Glen Indy Grand Prix was confirmed to be part of the IRL IndyCar Series's 2006 schedule in September 2005. It was the 5th of 14 scheduled races for 2006, the second annual edition of the event, and the first race of the season to be held in the Northeastern United States. It was held on Sunday, June 4, 2006, at Watkins Glen International, a 3.37 mi (5.42 km), 11-turn permanent road course circuit, in Watkins Glen, New York, United States, and was scheduled to be contested over 60 laps and 202.2 miles (325.4 km). Scott Dixon was the defending race winner. Heading into the event, Hélio Castroneves held the Drivers' Championship with 156 points. Sam Hornish Jr. improved to second in the standings with 144 points. Dan Wheldon fell to third with 139 points, while Dixon and Tony Kanaan rounded out the top five with 120 and 119 points, respectively.

This race marked the return of Ryan Briscoe, who suffered several injuries after a fiery crash at Chicagoland Speedway in September 2005. He drove the No. 5 entry for Dreyer & Reinbold Racing, filling in for Buddy Lazier. Team co-owner Dennis Reinbold stated that he and his team planned to evaluate Briscoe's performance during the race in order to improve their road-course efforts; Reinbold confirmed that Lazier would return in the next round at Texas. Besides this lone driver change, Hemelgarn Racing shut down their operations for the remainder of the 2006 season, following a second-lap crash in the Indianapolis 500 which took out both of the team's entries, thus leaving P. J. Chesson as a free agent.

In the days after Hornish Jr.'s victory in the Indianapolis 500, he began his "Victory Tour", which consisted of many media interviews on television and radio shows such as Mike & Mike in the Morning, Anderson Cooper 360°, and Live With Regis and Kelly; an additional appearance on The Late Show with David Letterman would air the day after the race at Watkins Glen. Hornish Jr. admitted that he was slightly tired, but was also grateful for the experience and hoped to do it again next year. By contrast, second-place finisher Marco Andretti was still dejected by the finish of the Indianapolis 500, but expressed excitement for the forthcoming event at Watkins Glen after successfully completing a test at the track the month prior.

== Practice and qualifying ==
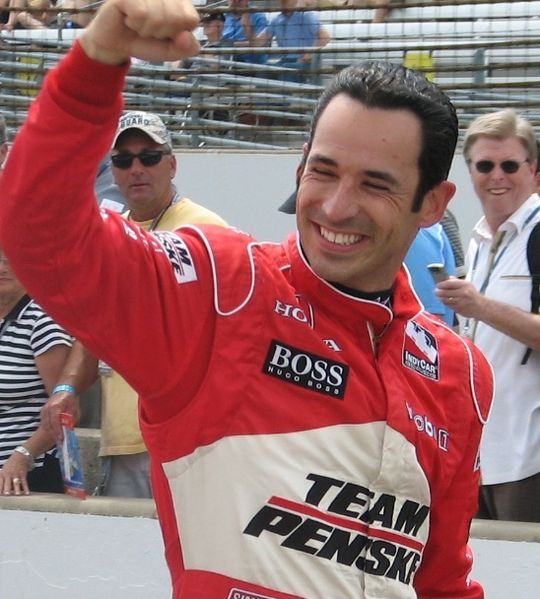
Hélio Castroneves (pictured in 2009) was awarded the pole position.

Three practice sessions preceded the race on Sunday; the first two were held on Friday, and the third was held on Saturday. The first session lasted for 120 minutes, while the last two were split into two groups, each receiving 30 minutes of track time. The groups would be determined by the speeds of the initial session. Castroneves was fastest in practice on Friday morning, with a quick time of 1 minute and 30.9112 seconds, ahead of Kanaan, Dixon, Hornish Jr., and Dario Franchitti. The session was stopped four times for spins involving Scott Sharp, Kanaan, Danica Patrick, and Tomas Scheckter, though they spun without contact. Castroneves later improved on his quick lap during practice on Friday afternoon with a time of 1 minute and 30.6783 seconds, becoming the fastest driver of the day, ahead of Kanaan, Andretti, Dixon, and Wheldon; he was accordingly given the responsibility to decide the qualifying order. The lone red flag of the session occurred when Vítor Meira spun in turn seven. Practice for the second group was also delayed by twelve minutes after a deer ran on the track.

On Saturday morning, inclement weather prevented a medical helicopter from entering the track, forcing Indy Racing League (IRL) officials to cancel qualifications. The starting grid was determined by practice speeds on Friday. Castroneves was awarded the pole position, while fellow Brazilian driver Kanaan started alongside him on the front row. Andretti, Dixon, and Wheldon took the third through fifth positions, while Hornish Jr., Franchitti, Meira, Bryan Herta, and Briscoe rounded out the top ten. Buddy Rice, Kosuke Matsuura, Jeff Simmons, Sharp, Scheckter, Patrick, Eddie Cheever, Ed Carpenter, and Felipe Giaffone started in the final nine positions. The third and final practice session was also delayed by nearly three hours and bunched into one group, which was given 75 minutes of practice. Scheckter was the fastest driver of the rain-filled session with a time of 1 minute and 38.7505 seconds, besting Cheever, Giaffone, Briscoe, and Dixon. Late in the session, Rice lost control of his car and spun in the first turn.

=== Qualifying classification ===
Pos.	No.	Driver	Team	Chassis	Grid
1	3	(Brazil) Hélio Castroneves	Team Penske	Dallara	1
2	11	(Brazil) Tony Kanaan	Andretti Green Racing	Dallara	2
3	26	(United States) Marco Andretti	Andretti Green Racing	Dallara	3
4	9	(New Zealand) Scott Dixon	Chip Ganassi Racing	Panoz	4
5	10	(United Kingdom) Dan Wheldon	Chip Ganassi Racing	Panoz	5
6	6	(United States) Sam Hornish Jr.	Team Penske	Dallara	6
7	27	(United Kingdom) Dario Franchitti	Andretti Green Racing	Dallara	7
8	4	(Brazil) Vítor Meira	Panther Racing	Dallara	8
9	7	(United States) Bryan Herta	Andretti Green Racing	Dallara	9
10	5	(Australia) Ryan Briscoe	Dreyer & Reinbold Racing	Dallara	10
11	15	(United States) Buddy Rice	Rahal Letterman Racing	Panoz	11
12	55	(Japan) Kosuke Matsuura	Fernández Racing	Dallara	12
13	17	(United States) Jeff Simmons	Rahal Letterman Racing	Panoz	13
14	8	(United States) Scott Sharp	Fernández Racing	Panoz	14
15	2	(South Africa) Tomas Scheckter	Vision Racing	Dallara	15
16	16	(United States) Danica Patrick	Rahal Letterman Racing	Panoz	16
17	51	(United States) Eddie Cheever	Cheever Racing	Dallara	17
18	20	(United States) Ed Carpenter	Vision Racing	Dallara	18
19	14	(Brazil) Felipe Giaffone	A. J. Foyt Racing	Dallara	19

== Warm-up ==
All nineteen drivers took to the track on Sunday morning for a thirty-minute warm-up session under foggy conditions. Castroneves lapped the quickest time of the session, at 1 minute and 49.2818 seconds. Kanaan, who ended the session two minutes early after spinning in turn one, was second-quickest, followed by Meira, Franchitti, and Herta. Cheever also spun in turn nine, but restarted his car with assistance from track marshals.

== Race ==
Dan Wheldon (pictured in 2007) led a race-high 13 laps, but exited the race due to a drive shaft failure.

The race began at 3:45 p.m. Eastern Standard Time (EST) on Sunday and was broadcast live on ABC in the United States. Commentary was provided by Marty Reid, while retired drivers Scott Goodyear and Rusty Wallace took the roles of race analysts. Weather conditions were damp, with air temperatures reaching 58 °F (14 °C). Chris Greico, executive of Tissot, commanded the drivers to start their engines. Because of rain earlier in the day, all 19 drivers were required to begin the race with rain tires, making this the first race in IndyCar Series history to be contested in the rain. On the first lap, Kanaan passed Castroneves for the lead in the fourth turn and led the first eight laps. Scheckter became the first driver to swap out his rain tires for slick tires on lap 4 as the track gradually became dryer. Many drivers, including Kanaan, would also enter pit road for slick tires and fuel on the seventh and eighth laps. Simmons, on the other hand, assumed the lead and elected to stay on the track until lap 9. However, as Simmons exited pit road, his cold tires caused him to spin out; the yellow flag was resultantly flown for the first time.

When the race was restarted on lap 12, Scheckter had interited the lead. Only a lap later, the yellow flag was necessitated again when Hornish Jr. spun exiting the seventh turn. Wheldon, running closely behind Hornish Jr., barely avoided hitting him. However, as he attempted to refire his car, his engine stalled, placing him a lap down. The third caution flag was issued on the restart on lap 16, when Franchitti, running in third, ran over a wet spot while entering the chicane and spun into the gravel trap. As other drivers backed off, Rice did not see the initial incident and slid into the tire barriers at the chicane. Both drivers drove away with the help of track marshals. During the subsequent restart on lap 20, Patrick backed into the wall exiting the final turn after receiving slight contact from Cheever, bringing out the fourth caution. More issues arose in the first turn when Matsuura attempted to pass Simmons, but oversteered and slammed into the tire barriers, becoming airborne and collecting Simmons in the process. Unlike Patrick, Matsuura and Simmons were unable to continue due to their heavy damage. In the midst of the chaos, Scheckter led twelve consecutive laps and did not reenter pit road until lap 22, when he gave up the lead to Wheldon for fuel. The green flag was waved again on lap 23.

As the attrition rate finally subsided, Wheldon pulled away from the field, gaining a 2.3-second lead over Castroneves by lap 30. Herta and Rice entered the pit lane on lap 34 for fresh tires and fuel, thus kicking off the second round of green-flag pit stops. A lap later, Wheldon drove into pit lane and conceded the lead to Castroneves, who was three tenths of a second ahead of Dixon. The fifth caution was triggered on lap 38 when Cheever, who had just exited pit lane with new tires, skidded into the path of Andretti in the ninth turn; Andretti resultantly veered into the tire barriers and retired from the race along with Cheever. Andretti was evidently furious and shook his fist at Cheever as he exited his cockpit. During this caution period, many top-running drivers elected to enter pit lane for four tires and fuel, while Rice chose to stay out and move to the race lead. Among the drivers who pitted was Castroneves, who suffered a setback when his car did not receive any fuel during his pit stop; he was forced to pit again the next lap and lose several positions. Wheldon suffered a worse fate, as his drive shaft had suddenly broken during a routine pit stop on lap 41. He retired from the race. In the meantime, Dixon emerged from pit lane ahead of every other driver and advanced his position to second.

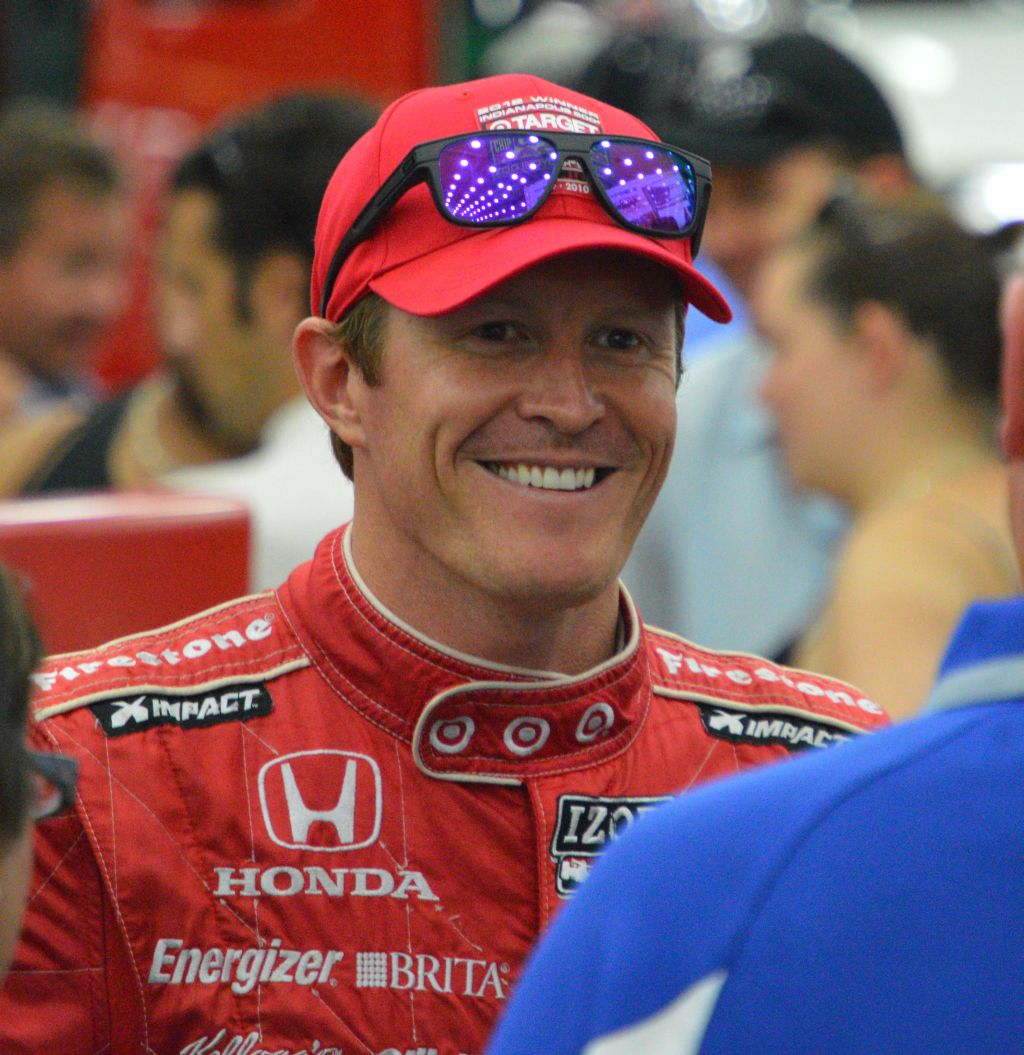
Scott Dixon (pictured in 2013) earned his fifth IndyCar Series win. As of 2026, it also marked Panoz's final win as a chassis constructor before they withdrew from the series in 2008.

More mayhem ensued during the restart on lap 46. Scheckter failed to brake on time entering the first turn and collided with Franchitti, spinning both cars out. They eventually refired their cars, prompting IRL officials to keep the race green. Later that same lap, Dixon moved to the inside line and overtook Rice for the lead entering the chicane. As this occurred, Kanaan made contact with teammate Herta, cutting Herta's right-front tire down and damaging Kanaan's front wing. Both drivers limped to the pits to repair their damage and were relegated outside the top ten. On the 49th lap, Meira pulled ahead of Rice for the second position at the chicane. The sixth caution of the race was issued a lap later when Kanaan broke loose entering turn eight and made light contact with the guardrail. With rain beginning to fall again, IRL officials announced that the race would become a timed event, which would end when it reached the two-hour mark; by this point, only ten minutes remained until that mark would be reached. Drivers were thus forced to decide whether to race in slick tires or rain tires. Rice, Patrick, Carpenter, and Castroneves chose to drive into pit lane for rain tires, while Dixon, Meira, and Briscoe made a gamble and stayed on track with their slick tires.

Many drivers with rain tires jockeyed to improve their positions and made their way around drivers with slick tires during the restart on the 53rd lap. The hustling for position eventually led to fourth-place driver Scheckter spinning off-course in turn eight and necessitating the seventh caution of the race. Scheckter was quickly able to refire his car, and the caution period only lasted one lap before the green and white flags were concurrently waved to signify the final lap of the race on lap 55. Dixon promptly drove away from the other drivers and carefully nursed his way through the circuit for the final time. He nearly drove off-course after losing traction in turn seven, but managed to regain control of his car and score his fifth IndyCar Series win. Dixon also became the first driver to earn two wins in IRL-sanctioned road course events. Meira finished in the second position, 2.3311 seconds behind Dixon, while Briscoe finished third and earned his first podium finish. Rice and Giaffone took the fourth and fifth positions, respectively, and Carpenter, Castroneves, Patrick, Sharp, and Scheckter rounded out the top ten. Kanaan, Hornish Jr., Herta, and Franchitti were the last of the classified finishers. Throughout the duration of the race, the lead position was swapped six times among seven different drivers. Seven cautions also slowed the race for 21 laps.

=== Post-race ===
Dixon celebrated his win with his team in victory lane; he had earned $115,800 in race winnings. Dixon said of his success at Watkins Glen: "I think it was a day where we were pretty confident throughout the race, knowing that we had the speed to do it. I think all year, the Target team with Dan and I, have had fast cars, we just weren't able to put it all together. We've won two races this year. We're back in winner's circle and the Energizer car is looking cool. We're just happy. It was extremely tough because of the conditions. It just started raining and it was hard to tell how hard to push it because you have 10-15 guys behind you that will push as hard. I think we had enough of a jump to hold them off. We definitely have a bit of luck here at Watkins Glen." Meira was equally as pleased with his finish, stating: "I'm happy because of where we finished. I'm happy for the team, for the league, for everybody. Finishing second would get old if I felt like we deserved to win, but that's not the case today. We fought hard to finish second here." Third-place finisher Briscoe was also very contended with where he ended up finishing: "I couldn't be happier. To be so close to a victory at the end was amazing. Just coming here for the one-off deal, I couldn't have asked for a better race." Briscoe also hoped that his finish would bring about more opportunities for him to compete in either the IndyCar Series or the Champ Car World Series.

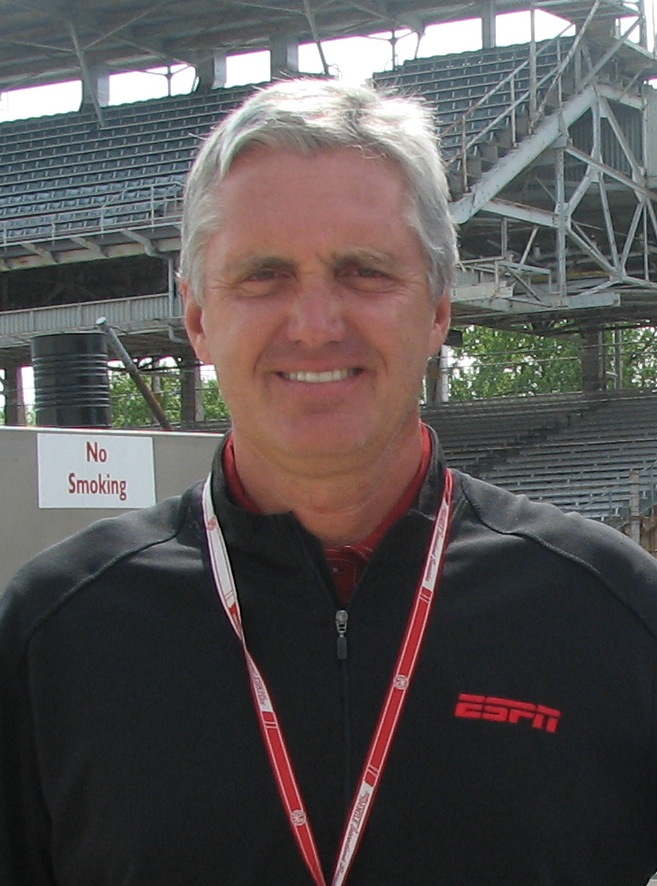
Eddie Cheever (pictured in 2009) was heavily criticized after the race for his collisions with Danica Patrick and Marco Andretti.

Following the race, much criticism had been directed towards Cheever due to his two incidents on Sunday. Patrick called Cheever an "idiot" during radio communications with her team and directly blamed Cheever for her spin on the 20th lap: "Cheever took me out on the restart and that was what put us a lap down. It is unfortunate and it is silly. There was no point in doing something so desperate on a restart, but he did it. I don't know why he was trying to pass there." Andretti shared similar ill will towards Cheever after their incident on the 38th lap: "It was blatant, absolutely blatant. It was absolutely on purpose. If he didn't know I was there, then that's pretty scary." He later noted that "it wasn't the first time we've had problems with him."

Michael Andretti doubled down on his son's statements, commenting: "It was so blatant. He does it all the time. He doesn't belong on the racetrack. The guy's a complete idiot." Andretti referenced his family's long-standing feud with Cheever, which stems from an incident during the 1992 Toyota Grand Prix of Long Beach, during an interview with Nicole Manske on the IMS Radio Network: "He had a problem with my father, he had a problem with me and now he's taking it out on my kid." Journalist John Oreovicz of ESPN was also critical of Cheever's driving during the race, writing: "Eddie Cheever Jr.'s involvement in a pair of controversial on-track collisions at The Glen doesn't come as a surprise."

Cheever, however, denied wrecking Andretti on purpose: "I had just gone out on the racetrack on a new set of tires and the track is very slippery. I was doing everything I could to keep the car straight. I never had any problem with anybody getting by. It was just bad circumstances." Days after the race, Cheever issued a statement responding to the accusations, calling them "incomprehensible" and stating: "It was a racing accident, pure and simple." He continued: "No single team is the center of the racing universe, no matter how much they seem to think they are. Nobody took them out intentionally, so their accusations look a bit ridiculous. The last I looked, I earned the label of Indy 500 champion; those lobbing unfounded accusations at me have not."

The finishing order of the race brought race winner Dixon from fourth to second in the Drivers' Championship with 170 points, only twelve less than leader Castroneves. Hornish Jr. fell to third with 162 points, and Wheldon fell to fourth with 157 points. Kanaan remained fifth with 138 points.

=== Race classification ===
Pos	No.	Driver	Team	Chassis	Laps	Time/Retired	Grid	Laps led	Points
1	9	(New Zealand) Scott Dixon	Chip Ganassi Racing	Panoz	55	02:00:20.0224	4	9	50
2	4	(Brazil) Vítor Meira	Panther Racing	Dallara	55	+2.3311	8	0	40
3	5	(Australia) Ryan Briscoe	Dreyer & Reinbold Racing	Dallara	55	+2.7999	10	0	35
4	15	(United States) Buddy Rice	Rahal Letterman Racing	Panoz	55	+9.2284	11	5	32
5	14	(Brazil) Felipe Giaffone	A. J. Foyt Racing	Dallara	55	+11.4811	19	0	30
6	20	(United States) Ed Carpenter	Vision Racing	Dallara	55	+12.4427	18	0	28
7	3	(Brazil) Hélio Castroneves	Team Penske	Dallara	55	+13.0455	1	7	26
8	16	(United States) Danica Patrick	Rahal Letterman Racing	Panoz	55	+13.3289	16	0	24
9	8	(United States) Scott Sharp	Fernández Racing	Panoz	55	+16.6462	14	0	22
10	2	(South Africa) Tomas Scheckter	Vision Racing	Dallara	55	+48.4872	15	12	20
11	11	(Brazil) Tony Kanaan	Andretti Green Racing	Dallara	54	+1 Lap	2	8	19
12	6	(United States) Sam Hornish Jr.	Team Penske	Dallara	54	+1 Lap	6	0	18
13	7	(United States) Bryan Herta	Andretti Green Racing	Dallara	54	+1 Lap	9	0	17
14	27	(United Kingdom) Dario Franchitti	Andretti Green Racing	Dallara	44	+11 Laps	7	0	16
15	10	(United Kingdom) Dan Wheldon	Chip Ganassi Racing	Panoz	41	Drive shaft	5	13	18^{1}
16	26	(United States) Marco Andretti	Andretti Green Racing	Dallara	38	Accident	3	0	14
17	51	(United States) Eddie Cheever	Cheever Racing	Dallara	37	Accident	17	0	13
18	55	(Japan) Kosuke Matsuura	Fernández Racing	Dallara	19	Accident	12	0	12
19	17	(United States) Jeff Simmons	Rahal Letterman Racing	Panoz	18	Accident	13	1	12

Notes

- ^1 — Includes three bonus points for leading the most laps.

== Championship standings after the race ==
Drivers' Championship standings

	Pos.	Driver	Points
Unchanged	1	(Brazil) Hélio Castroneves	182
2	2	(New Zealand) Scott Dixon	170 (–12)
1	3	(United States) Sam Hornish Jr.	162 (–20)
1	4	(United Kingdom) Dan Wheldon	157 (–25)
Unchanged	5	(Brazil) Tony Kanaan	138 (–44)

- Note: Only the top five positions are included.

Previous race: 2006 Indianapolis 500	IndyCar Series; 2006 season	Next race: 2006 Bombardier Learjet 500
Previous race: 2005 Watkins Glen Indy Grand Prix	Grand Prix at The Glen	Next race: 2007 Camping World Watkins Glen Grand Prix
