= 2006 IndyCar Series =

American open-wheel racing season

2006 IndyCar season
- IRL IndyCar Series

Season
- Races: 14
- Start date: March 26
- End date: September 10

Awards
- Drivers' champion: (United States) Sam Hornish Jr.
- Rookie of the Year: (United States) Marco Andretti
- Indianapolis 500 winner: (United States) Sam Hornish Jr.

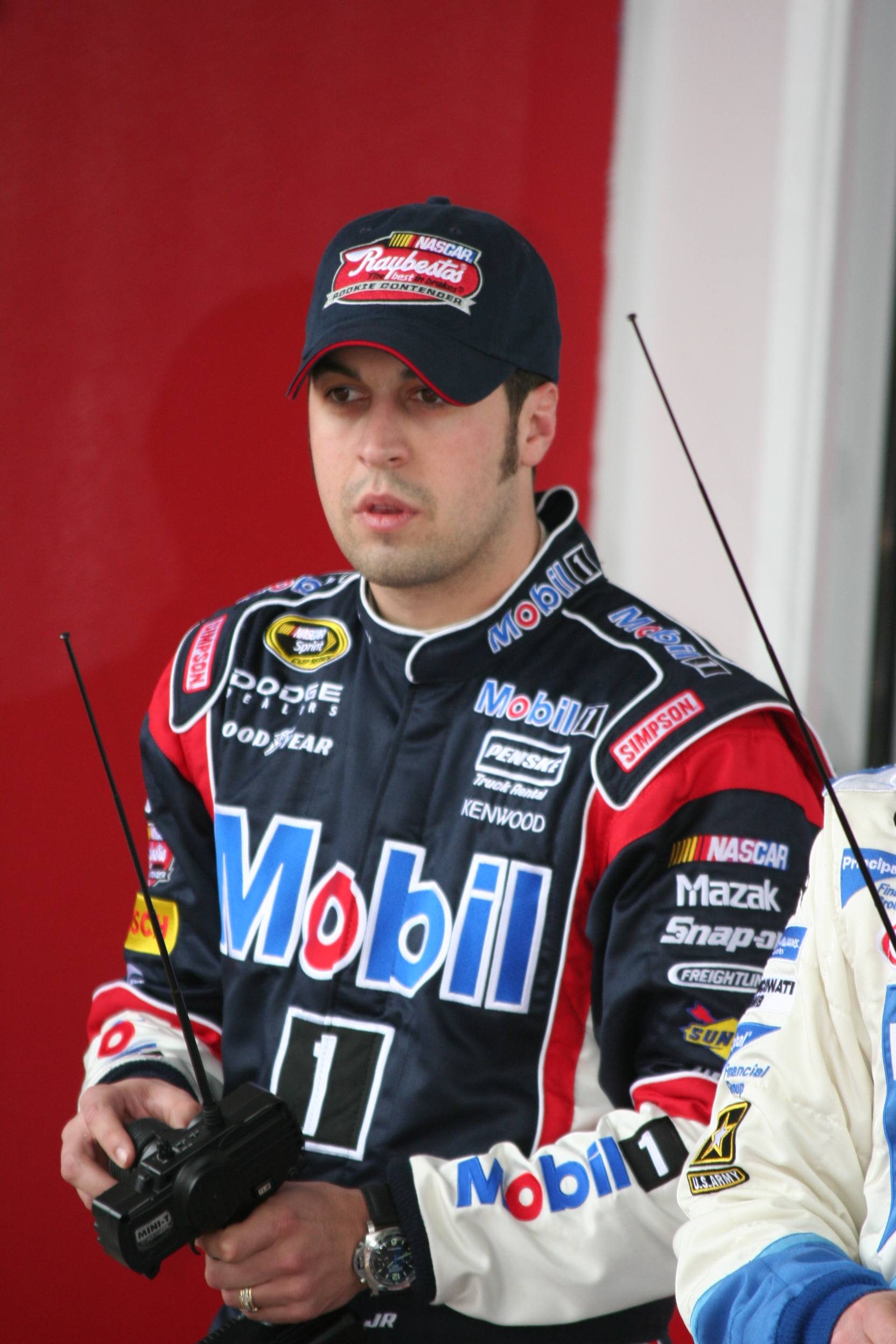
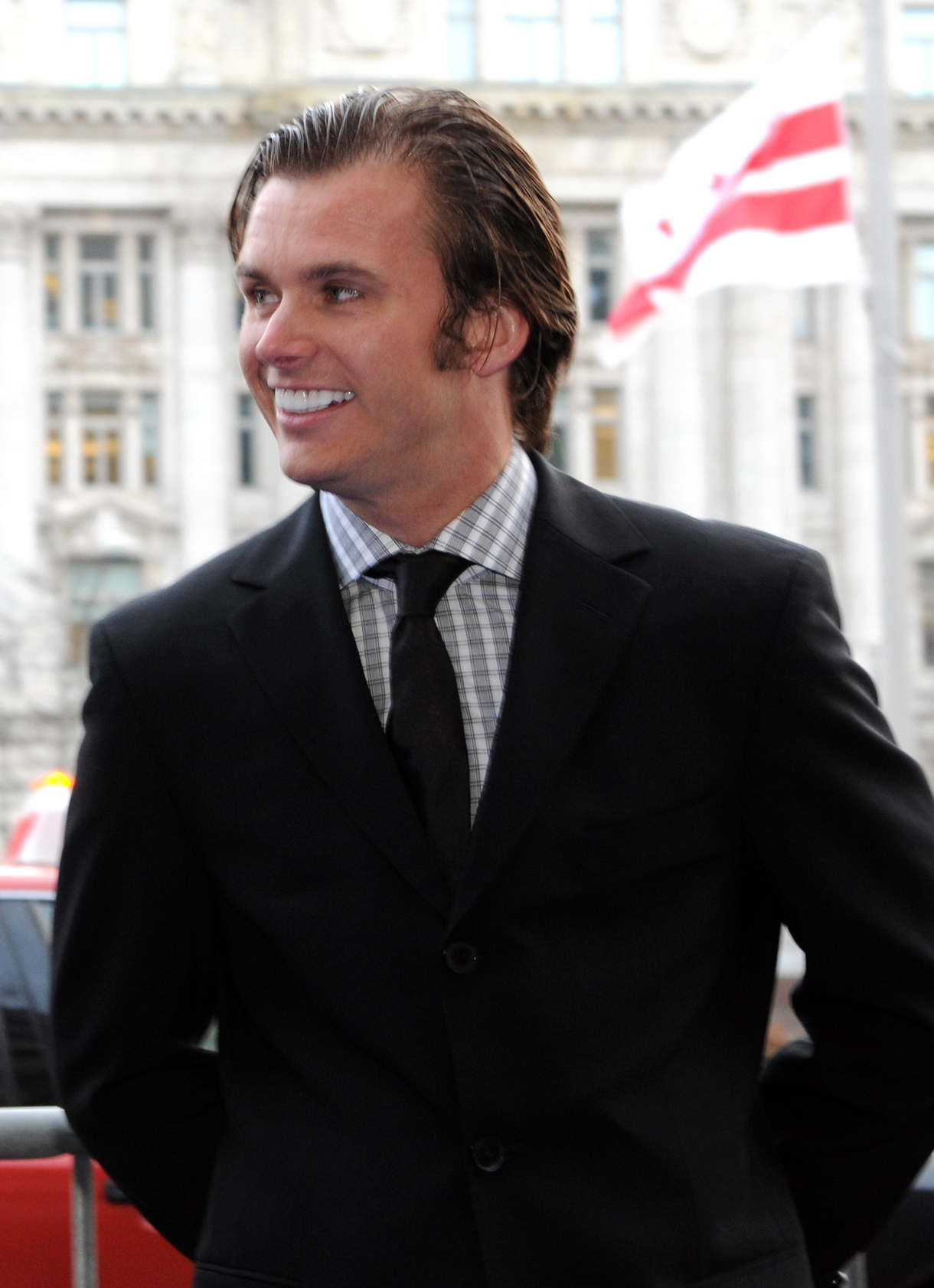
Sam Hornish Jr. (left) won his third Drivers' Championship, while Dan Wheldon (right) finished second due to a tiebreaker in the final race of the season.

The 2006 IRL IndyCar Series was an auto racing championship for American open-wheel cars that was sanctioned by the Indy Racing League (IRL). It was the 11th season of the IRL IndyCar Series and it encompassed the 95th national championship season (Note: This refers to the national championship seasons in 1905, 1916, and every year since 1920. The seasons in 1909–1915 and 1917–1919 were retrospectively assigned champions by AAA Contest Board members Arthur Means and Val Haresnape in 1927 and sportswriter Russ Caitlin in 1951, though accredited statisticians do not consider the championships to be official.) with the rivaling Champ Car World Series' 2006 season. The season featured 14 races between March 26 and September 10. Sam Hornish Jr. of Team Penske won the series' premier event, the 90th Indianapolis 500, and the Drivers' Championship.

Dan Wheldon entered the season as the defending Drivers' Champion and Indianapolis 500 winner. In the off-season, Wheldon left Andretti Green Racing (AGR), the team with which he won the title in 2005, to drive for Chip Ganassi Racing (CGR). The season began under negative circumstances as three tracks (Phoenix International Raceway, California Speedway, and Pikes Peak International Raceway) were taken off the schedule and Honda was left as the series' sole engine provider. Additionally, rookie driver Paul Dana was killed in a crash during a warm-up session for the opening round at Homestead–Miami Speedway.

Castroneves quickly emerged as a championship contender, winning two of the first three races, but several crashes later in the season allowed Hornish Jr. to take the championship lead after the Kansas Lottery Indy 300 in July. Although CGR drivers Wheldon and Scott Dixon only won two races each, their consistency helped them continue their fight for the title. The four drivers' battle persisted into the season finale, the Peak Antifreeze Indy 300 at Chicagoland Speedway, which ended with Hornish Jr. and Wheldon tied for the championship. Wheldon led the most laps and won the race, but Hornish Jr. was awarded his third (and final) career championship on account of earning more wins in the season than Wheldon. Twelve of the 14 races in the season were won by either Team Penske or CGR.

Marco Andretti, Wheldon's replacement at AGR, was declared the Rookie of the Year for 2006, as he finished runner-up in the Indianapolis 500 and won the Indy Grand Prix of Sonoma, which made him the youngest winner of a major American open-wheel race until 2008.

== Teams and drivers ==
The following teams and drivers took part in the 2006 IndyCar Series. All entries competed with Honda engines and Firestone tires.

Team	Chassis	No.	Drivers	Rounds
(United States) A. J. Foyt Racing	Dallara	14	(Brazil) Felipe Giaffone	1–8
(United States) A. J. Foyt Racing	Dallara	14	(United States) Jeff Bucknum	9–14
(United States) A. J. Foyt Racing	Dallara	41	(United States) Larry Foyt R	4
(United States) Andretti Green Racing	Dallara	1	(United States) Michael Andretti	4
(United States) Andretti Green Racing	Dallara	7	(United States) Bryan Herta	All
(United States) Andretti Green Racing	Dallara	11	(Brazil) Tony Kanaan	All
(United States) Andretti Green Racing	Dallara	26	(United States) Marco Andretti R	All
(United States) Andretti Green Racing	Dallara	27	(United Kingdom) Dario Franchitti	1–13
(United States) Andretti Green Racing	Dallara	27	(United States) A. J. Foyt IV	14
(United States) Cheever Racing	Dallara	51	(United States) Eddie Cheever	1–2, 4–8
(United States) Cheever Racing	Dallara	51	(Czech Republic) Tomáš Enge	3
(United States) Cheever Racing	Dallara	52	(Italy) Max Papis	4
(United States) Chip Ganassi Racing	Dallara; Panoz (Note: Used in the road courses.)	9	(New Zealand) Scott Dixon	All
(United States) Chip Ganassi Racing	Dallara; Panoz	10	(United Kingdom) Dan Wheldon	All
(United States) Dreyer & Reinbold Racing	Dallara	5	(United States) Buddy Lazier	1–4, 6–8, 11
(United States) Dreyer & Reinbold Racing	Dallara	5	(Australia) Ryan Briscoe	5, 9–10, 13
(United States) Dreyer & Reinbold Racing	Dallara	5	(United States) Sarah Fisher	12, 14
(United States) Dreyer & Reinbold Racing	Dallara	31	(United States) Al Unser Jr.	4
(Mexico) Fernández Racing	Panoz	8	(United States) Scott Sharp	2, 5, 13
(Mexico) Fernández Racing	Dallara	8	(United States) Scott Sharp	1, 3–4, 6–12, 14
(Mexico) Fernández Racing	Dallara	55	(Japan) Kosuke Matsuura	All
(United States) Hemelgarn Racing	Dallara	91	(United States) P. J. Chesson R	1–4
(United States) Hemelgarn Racing	Dallara	92	(United States) Jeff Bucknum	4
(Netherlands) Luyendyk Racing	Panoz	61	(Netherlands) Arie Luyendyk Jr.	4
(United States) Panther Racing	Dallara	4	(Brazil) Vítor Meira	All
(United States) PDM Racing	Panoz	18	(Brazil) Thiago Medeiros R	4
(United States) Playa del Racing	Panoz	12	(United States) Roger Yasukawa	4
(United States) Playa del Racing	Panoz	21	(United States) Jaques Lazier	4
(United States) Rahal Letterman Racing	Panoz (Note: Used from Homestead to Watkins Glen, and at Sonoma.); Dallara	15	(United States) Buddy Rice	All
(United States) Rahal Letterman Racing	Panoz; Dallara	16	(United States) Danica Patrick	All
(United States) Rahal Letterman Racing	Panoz; Dallara	17	(United States) Paul Dana R	1
(United States) Rahal Letterman Racing	Panoz; Dallara	17	(United States) Jeff Simmons R	3–14
(Canada) Roth Racing	Dallara	25	(Canada) Marty Roth R	4, 11–12, 14
(United States) Sam Schmidt Motorsports	Panoz	88	(Brazil) Airton Daré	4
(United States) Team Leader-Curb-Agajanian-Beck Motorsports	Panoz	97	(France) Stéphan Grégoire	4
(United States) Curb-Agajanian-Beck Motorsports	Panoz	98	(United States) P. J. Jones	4
(United States) Team Penske	Dallara	3	(Brazil) Hélio Castroneves	All
(United States) Team Penske	Dallara	6	(United States) Sam Hornish Jr.	All
(United States) Vision Racing	Dallara	2	(South Africa) Tomas Scheckter	All
(United States) Vision Racing	Dallara	20	(United States) Ed Carpenter	1, 3–14
(United States) Vision Racing	Dallara	20	(Brazil) Roberto Moreno	2
(United States) Vision Racing	Dallara	90	(United States) Townsend Bell	4

Key
Symbol	Meaning
R	Eligible for Rookie of the Year

=== Team changes ===
Every time that competed full-time in the IndyCar Series in 2005 returned for the new season. Chip Ganassi Racing (CGR) and Scott Sharp of Fernández Racing switched to the Dallara IR-05 chassis for the oval tracks and reverted to the Panoz GF09 chassis on road courses. Beginning with the Bombardier Learjet 500, Rahal Letterman Racing (RLR) also began fielding Dallara chassis and only resorted to the Panoz chassis in the Indy Grand Prix of Sonoma. Sharp's teammate Kosuke Matsuura ran the Dallara chassis for the entire season.

=== Driver changes ===
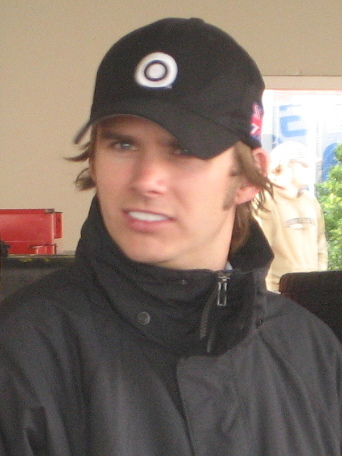
Dan Wheldon (pictured in 2008) joined Chip Ganassi Racing in 2006, despite his success with Andretti Green Racing the previous season.

Several significant driver changes occurred prior to the season. After winning the 89th Indianapolis 500 and Drivers' Championship in 2005, Dan Wheldon chose not to renew his contract with Andretti Green Racing (AGR), causing rumors to spread about his possible shift to Formula One. These rumors proved to be unfounded as Wheldon joined CGR for 2006. Wheldon was then replaced by Marco Andretti, a debutant in the IndyCar Series and the son of AGR co-owner Michael Andretti who had announced his one-off return from retirement in the 90th Indianapolis 500. Other American open-wheel car racing veterans who competed in the 90th Indianapolis 500 include two-time race winner Al Unser Jr. (with Dreyer & Reinbold Racing) and 1998 race winner Eddie Cheever (with Cheever Racing), the latter of whom also planned to participate in the first three races of the season leading up to the Indianapolis 500.

As famed actor Patrick Dempsey took on a co-owner role at Vision Racing, the team expanded to two full-time entries which were driven by the returning Ed Carpenter and former Panther Racing driver Tomas Scheckter. Conversely, Panther Racing was forced to scale back to a single full-time entry due to their tightening budget, let go Tomáš Enge in the process, and hired Vítor Meira to replace Scheckter for the season. Meira's seat at RLR was filled by Paul Dana, who raced for Hemelgarn Racing prior to his season-ending crash during practice for the 2005 Indianapolis 500. Hemelgarn Racing replaced Dana with P. J. Chesson, a popular driver in the World of Outlaws, and announced their partnership with NBA player Carmelo Anthony.

A. J. Foyt Racing replaced A. J. Foyt IV with Felipe Giaffone as Foyt IV set off to race in the NASCAR Busch Series. Giaffone had previously driven for A. J. Foyt in the 2005 Indianapolis 500. After an adverse season with Roger Yasukawa, Dreyer & Reinbold Racing replaced him with Buddy Lazier in their new No. 5 entry.

==== Mid-season changes ====
Following Dana's death in a practice crash leading up to the Toyota Indy 300, Jeff Simmons filled his seat starting from the Indy Japan 300. Carpenter, who was also involved in the crash that killed Dana, was deemed medically unfit to run the Honda Grand Prix of St. Petersburg; he was substituted by veteran open-wheel racing driver Roberto Moreno. During the Indy Japan 300, Enge—now a full-time driver in the A1 Grand Prix championship—drove in place of Cheever, who opted to compete in the Grand Am Rolex Sports Car Series race at Virginia International Raceway.

Hemelgarn Racing ceased operations for the remainder of the season after a second-lap crash in the 90th Indianapolis 500 destroyed both of their cars, driven by Chesson and Jeff Bucknum. While Chesson was unable to secure a ride afterward, Bucknum replaced Giaffone at A. J. Foyt Racing beginning with the Firestone Indy 200. Before that same race, Cheever (whose team completed eight races, four more than initially expected) was forced to shut down his IndyCar Series operations due to a lack of funding.

In the Watkins Glen Indy Grand Prix, Ryan Briscoe returned to the IndyCar Series with Dreyer & Reinbold Racing for the first time since his fiery crash at Chicagoland Speedway in 2005. An impressive third-place finish led to a continued partnership with the team in the Firestone Indy 200, the ABC Supply / A. J. Foyt Indy 225, and the Indy Grand Prix of Sonoma. For the final two oval races of the season, the Meijer Indy 300 and the Peak Antifreeze Indy 300, Lazier's seat was filled by Sarah Fisher in what marked her first career starts since the 2004 Indianapolis 500.

Roth Racing shut down their Indy Pro Series program in May and intended to run the final ten races of the season with owner-driver Marty Roth, beginning at the Indianapolis 500. The team's plans were sidelined, however, after Roth crashed in practice and failed to qualify for the race. Roth still managed to run in the last three oval races of the season, beginning with the Firestone Indy 400. For the Peak Antifreeze 300, Dario Franchitti was substituted by Foyt IV, whose venture into the Busch Series prematurely ended due to poor results, after Franchitti suffered a concussion following a crash in qualifying for the Goodwood Revival.

== Schedule ==
Round	Date	Race	Track	Location	TV
1	March 26	Toyota Indy 300	O Homestead-Miami Speedway	(United States) Homestead, Florida	ABC
2	April 2	Honda Grand Prix of St. Petersburg	S Streets of St. Petersburg	(United States) St. Petersburg, Florida	ESPN
3	April 22	Indy Japan 300	O Twin Ring Motegi	(Japan) Motegi, Tochigi	ESPN
4	May 28	Indianapolis 500	O Indianapolis Motor Speedway	(United States) Speedway, Indiana	ABC
5	June 4	Watkins Glen Indy Grand Prix	R Watkins Glen International	(United States) Watkins Glen, New York	ABC
6	June 10	Bombardier Learjet 500	O Texas Motor Speedway	(United States) Fort Worth, Texas	ESPN
7	June 24	SunTrust Indy Challenge	O Richmond International Raceway	(United States) Richmond, Virginia	ESPN
8	July 2	Kansas Lottery Indy 300	O Kansas Speedway	(United States) Kansas City, Kansas	ABC
9	July 15	Firestone Indy 200	O Nashville Superspeedway	(United States) Lebanon, Tennessee	ESPN
10	July 23	ABC Supply / A. J. Foyt Indy 225	O Milwaukee Mile	(United States) West Allis, Wisconsin	ESPN
11	July 30	Firestone Indy 400	O Michigan International Speedway	(United States) Brooklyn, Michigan	ABC
12	August 13	Meijer Indy 300	O Kentucky Speedway	(United States) Sparta, Kentucky	ABC
13	August 27	Indy Grand Prix of Sonoma	R Infineon Raceway	(United States) Sonoma, California	ESPN
14	September 10	Peak Antifreeze Indy 300	O Chicagoland Speedway	(United States) Joliet, Illinois	ABC

Key
Symbol	Track type
O	Oval track
R	Road course
S	Street circuit

=== Calendar changes ===
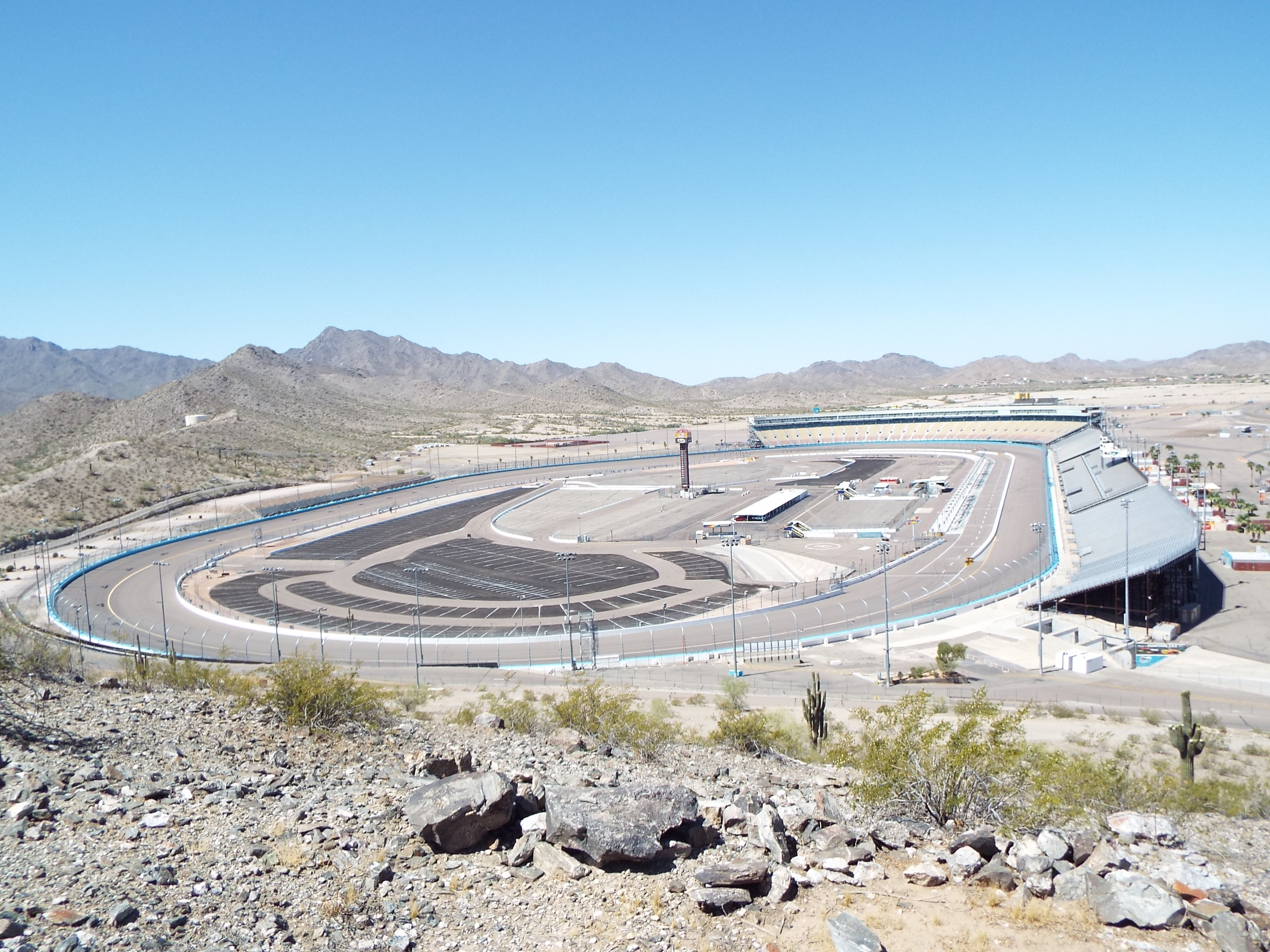
Phoenix International Raceway (pictured in 2016) was one of three circuits to be removed from the IndyCar Series' schedule ahead of the 2006 season.

The 2006 schedule was notably compressed with a span of 25 weeks between the first and last races, eight weeks fewer than the previous season's schedule. Indy Racing League (IRL) president Brian Barnhart explained that the schedule was shortened to avoid conflicts with the National Football League and Major League Baseball and attain high television ratings. In response to the criticism of the schedule, Barnhart ensured that the IRL was working on hosting more races in the 2007 schedule, specifically in Canada and Mexico.

Three tracks—California Speedway, Phoenix International Raceway, and Pikes Peak International Raceway—were omitted from the 2006 schedule. Promoters of the former two tracks were unable to find an available weekend that suited their schedule and the condensed IndyCar Series schedule, while the latter track was sold to International Speedway Corporation and shut down in October 2005. With California left off the schedule, Chicagoland Speedway's Peak Antifreeze Indy 300 now played host to the IndyCar Series season finale. The Watkins Glen Indy Grand Prix was also shifted up from its original September date to June, the weekend following the Indianapolis 500.

The IRL attempted to bring the Champ Car World Series (CCWS)-sanctioned Grand Prix of Long Beach to the IndyCar Series for 2006, but CCWS co-owner Kevin Kalkhoven bought out the event in June 2005 in order for the event to remain on his series' schedule. This reportedly angered sponsors of the IndyCar Series' teams because Tony George, founder of the IRL, had previously assured teams that the series would be racing in Long Beach and Canada in 2006.

== Changes ==
=== Mechanical regulations ===
One company, Honda, supplied engines in 2006, down from three companies the previous season. In November 2004, General Motors announced the withdrawal of Chevrolet from the IndyCar Series after 2005, citing escalating costs and their lack of competitiveness. With mounting rumors of Toyota's impending withdrawal, Honda committed to supplying engines and vowed to remain impartial towards every team in the series. Toyota eventually confirmed their departure from the series the day after Honda's announcement.

For 2006, the IndyCar Series began their shift towards ethanol fuel after using methanol fuel since the series' inception in 1996. The shift was gradual, with each car utilizing a blend of 90% methanol and 10% ethanol before switching to a 100% ethanol blend in 2007. To further promote ethanol usage, RLR obtained sponsorship from Team Ethanol, a coalition of several ethanol design–build farms.

=== Television broadcasting ===
ABC and ESPN returned to broadcast the entire season in the United States. Newly retired NASCAR Nextel Cup Series driver Rusty Wallace joined Scott Goodyear as a color commentator, while Marty Reid became the play-by-play commentator. Reid replaced Todd Harris, who was heavily criticized for his commentary during the 2005 Indianapolis 500. Jack Arute, Jamie Little, and Jerry Punch retained their roles as pit road reporters. Brent Musburger hosted three IndyCar Series broadcasts, including the Indianapolis 500.

== Season report ==
=== Pre-season testing ===
On January 24–25, fifteen teams gathered at Phoenix International Raceway for a private two-day test to familiarize themselves with their Honda engines. With no complaints from any team, Brian Barnhart considered the test an overall success. Eighteen teams participated in an Open Test on March 2, 3, and 5 at Homestead–Miami Speedway; the first two days of the test were spent on the circuit's road course configuration to prepare for the Honda Grand Prix of St. Petersburg, while the last day was run on the oval configuration. The testing at Homestead built anticipation for the season-opening Toyota Indy 300 at Homestead as the top-ten quickest drivers on the final day were separated by less than four tenths of a second.

=== Opening rounds ===
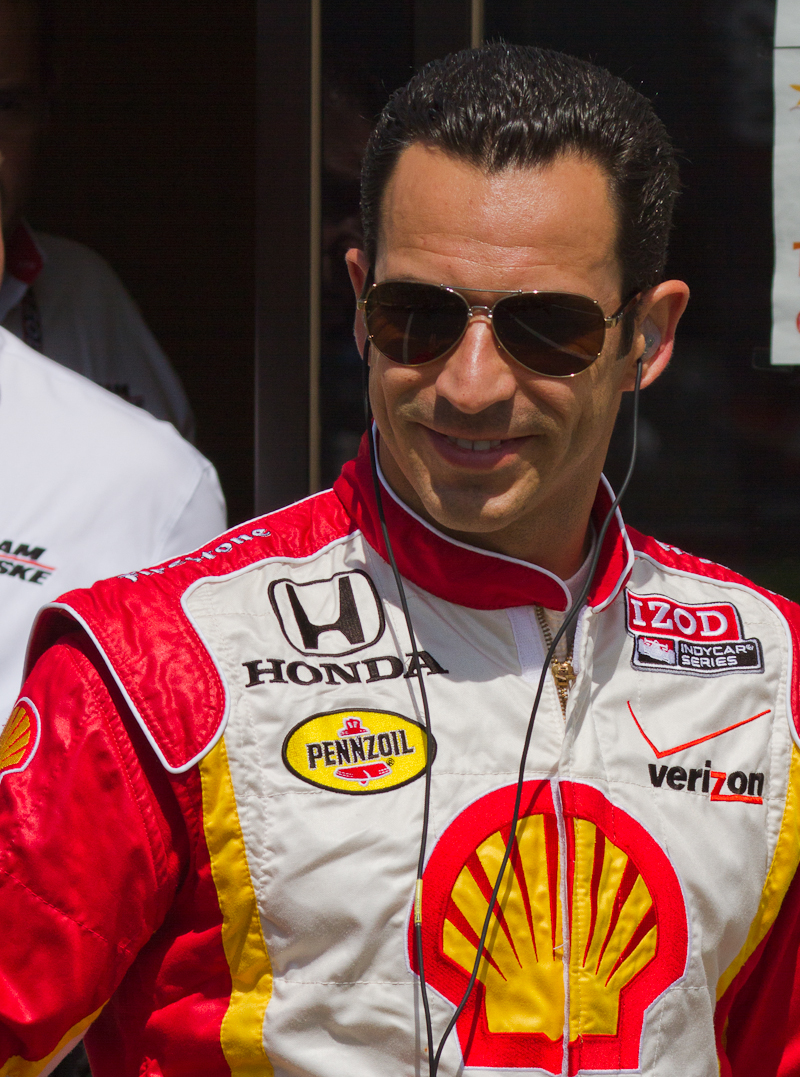
Hélio Castroneves (pictured in 2011) won two of the first three races.

Tragedy struck several hours before the Toyota Indy 300. During a morning warm-up session for the race, Carpenter crashed into the turn-two SAFER barrier and slid down the track. Despite several indications that the caution flag had been issued, Dana failed to slow his pace and slammed into the rear of Carpenter's car at nearly full-speed. While Carpenter suffered a concussion and bruised lungs, Dana succumbed to his injuries shortly before noon local time. Dana's teammates, Buddy Rice and Danica Patrick, did not participate in the race out of respect for him. Although several drivers suggested to cancel the race, it began as scheduled with 16 cars on the starting grid. Sam Hornish Jr., who won the pole position the day prior, led a race-high 145 laps, but was relegated to fifth place after a poorly timed caution was flown as he made a pit stop on lap 160. Hornish Jr.'s teammate Hélio Castroneves moved into the lead, but on lap 180, Wheldon began challenging him for the first position. The two drivers remained side-by-side in the final twenty laps, and Wheldon eventually nosed ahead of Castroneves for the win by 0.0147 seconds, the ninth-closest finish in IndyCar Series history thus far.

After completing another test on Homestead's road course layout, the IndyCar Series teams traveled to St. Petersburg for the second round of the season. RLR chose to only field two cars and did not replace Dana for the time being. Franchitti showcased immense speed throughout the weekend, setting the fastest laps of two practice sessions and earning the pole position. However, during the warm-up session, he crashed into the turn-eight tire barriers and damaged his suspension. Franchitti's team attempted to alleviate the damage, but it began affecting him again five laps into the race. After leading the first 14 laps, he drove into pit road and retired. Franchitti's misfortune allowed Scott Dixon to take the first position. Although Dixon struggled with a broken front wing, he maintained the lead until Castroneves overtook him on lap 45. While Castroneves made a pit stop for fuel on lap 87, Dixon—utilizing a conservative fuel strategy—remained on the circuit until lap 95 in order to battle with Castroneves for the win. Dixon's strategy was ultimately ruined when a full-course caution was flown two laps later, giving the win to Castroneves.

In the three weeks leading up to the Indy Japan 300 at Motegi, RLR named Jeff Simmons as Paul Dana's replacement for the rest of the season. Simmons and sixteen other drivers partook in an open testing session at Indianapolis Motor Speedway, which ran without incident. Two practice sessions and qualifying were cancelled due to persistent rainfall at Motegi and the starting grid was determined by entrant points, thus giving Castroneves the pole position. Castroneves held the lead until he was passed by Wheldon on lap 24, though he reclaimed the first position after making a quick pit stop under caution. From there, Castroneves was largely unchallenged and scored his second consecutive victory. Dixon looked to challenge Castroneves for the win before he stalled during his final pit stop on lap 149, dropping him to ninth at the checkered flag. The race's most notable incident occurred on a restart at lap 41 when Simmons collided into Sharp and flipped on the front stretch; no one was injured.

=== Indianapolis 500 ===
Rainy conditions shortened eight days of on-track activity throughout the month of May, including the first two days of qualifying. Hornish Jr. gradually became the favorite to win the race as he led all but one practice session and earned the pole position with a four-lap average speed of 228.985 mph (368.516 km/h). He started alongside teammate Castroneves and defending race winner Wheldon on the front row. The 33rd and final starting position was taken by Thiago Medeiros on Bump Day, the final day of qualifications, after his main threat for the position, Marty Roth, crashed while making a practice run. Ryan Briscoe planned to bump Medeiros from the starting grid in an A. J. Foyt Racing car, but the caution period after Roth's crash denied him a chance to drive on the track.

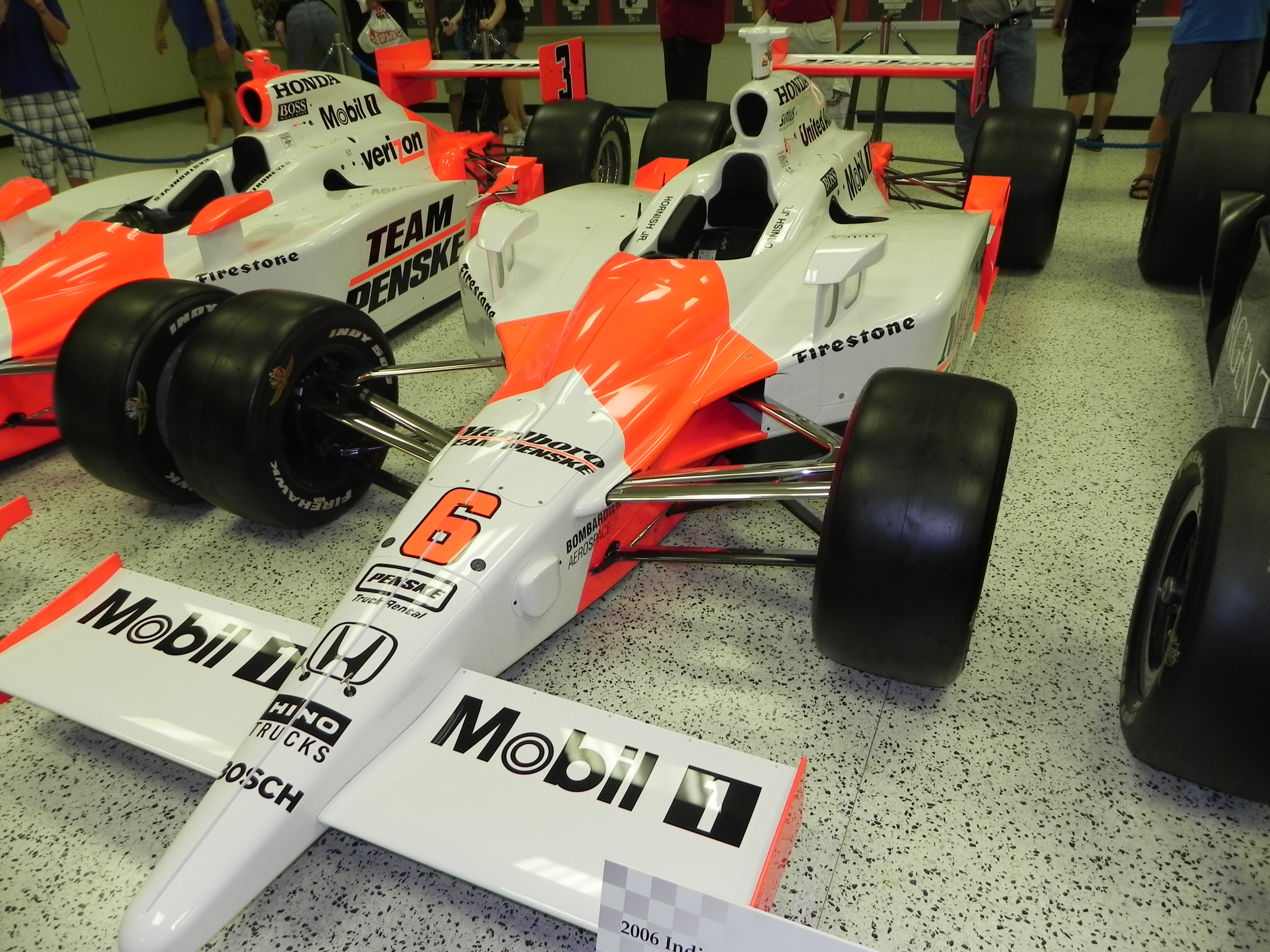
Sam Hornish Jr. earned his first Indianapolis 500 win by swerving his car (pictured) to the left of Marco Andretti and passing him on the final lap.

The rainfall that plagued much of the month's festivities eased off and made way for 89 °F (32 °C) weather on race day. Hornish Jr. fell to third at the start of the race, behind Castroneves and Wheldon. The latter moved ahead of Castroneves into the lead on lap 10 and dominated the first half of the race, only relinquishing the lead during green-flag pit stops, until Dixon's battle with Wheldon on a lap-123 restart allowed Hornish Jr. to take the lead. However, a disastrous pit stop miscue under a caution period relegated Hornish Jr. to seventh. He and Michael Andretti made their final pit stops on lap 160 as part of their strategy to put themselves in a position to win. Through a tire failure that Wheldon suffered on lap 184 and a caution issued seven laps later, Michael Andretti took the lead with his son Marco in second place. Marco overtook Michael for the lead shortly after a restart on the 198th lap and tried to defend his position from the hard-charging Hornish Jr. On the final lap, Hornish Jr. dove to Marco's left side and executed a slingshot pass to take the win by 0.0635 seconds, the second-closest finish in Indianapolis 500 history. (Note: As of 2026, it is the fourth-closest finish in Indianapolis 500 history.) Castroneves entered the month of May with a 42-point lead in the championship, but left with a 12-point lead after crashing out of the race on lap 111.

=== Mid-season rounds ===
Because of the damp track surface, the drivers were required to start the Watkins Glen Indy Grand Prix with rain tires for the first time in IndyCar Series history. Kanaan, who started in second after qualifying was rained out, passed pole-sitter Castroneves on the first lap. As the track gradually became dryer, the drivers opted to switch to slick tires, beginning with Scheckter on lap 4. Scheckter's early pit stop allowed him to inherit the lead on lap 10 while the leaders made their stops; he led until he made another stop for fuel on lap 22. Wheldon then held the lead for 13 laps before a broken drive shaft during his final pit stop forced him to retire. With rain beginning to fall on the track again, IRL officials announced the curtailment of the race once it reached a duration of two hours. Dixon gambled to stay on track with his slick tires, unlike the other leaders who switched back to rain tires, and nursed around the slickened track to earn the win, followed by Meira and Briscoe.

In the next round of the season, the Bombardier Learjet 500 at Texas, Wheldon passed pole-sitter Hornish Jr. on the second lap and led a race-high 171 laps, only conceding the lead during green-flag pit stops. Wheldon's last stop on lap 185 was elongated, however, after one of his crewmen dropped a lug nut, sending him back to third in the running order. Hornish Jr. had a chance to win the race before he, too, experienced a miscue in his final stop. Castroneves benefitted from Wheldon and Hornish Jr.'s troubles and led the final eight laps to earn the victory. The win widened Castroneves' lead in the championship to 22 points over Dixon.

Hornish Jr. set the fastest time of a testing session conducted at Richmond International Raceway two days prior to the SunTrust Indy Challenge, but crashed and resorted to a back-up car for the race weekend. This did not hinder Hornish Jr.'s speed, as he started third—two spots behind teammate Castroneves—on account of his fastest lap of Friday's practice sessions after rainfall cancelled qualifying. Hornish Jr. went on to pass Castroneves on lap 39 and win the race without serious competition, with Meira in second and Franchitti third. Castroneves, meanwhile, punctured his right-rear tire on lap 246 and fell to tenth at the finish; his gap over Hornish Jr. in the championship resultantly dwindled to five points.

For the first time since 2004, Wheldon qualified on the pole position for an IndyCar Series race, that being Kansas Speedway's Kansas Lottery Indy 300. Hornish Jr., whose 27th birthday coincided with the race, first took the lead on lap 7 and led a majority of the laps. However, Wheldon constantly ran in close proximity of Hornish Jr. and even pulled ahead of him on a handful of occasions. Following the final restart on lap 183, Hornish Jr. and Wheldon raced alongside each other until the former finally pulled away with two laps remaining to take the win. Castroneves only mustered a sixth-place finish after spinning into the wall on lap 37 and lost the championship lead to Hornish Jr.

Wheldon and Hornish Jr. continued their season rivalry at Nashville Superspeedway, where they took the first two positions in qualifying once again for the Firestone Indy 200. Wheldon held onto the lead for much of the first half of the race, only briefly losing it to Hornish Jr. on a restart. After Hornish Jr. crashed in turn two on lap 130, an ensuing cycle of pit stops shuffled Dixon to the first position. He held off Wheldon and Meira in the remaining laps to win the race and improve to second place in the championship.

=== Closing rounds ===
The Team Penske drivers locked out the front row for the next race, the ABC Supply / A. J. Foyt Indy 225 at the Milwaukee Mile, with Castroneves qualifying ahead of Hornish Jr. Kanaan overtook Castroneves for the first position on lap 32 and maintained his lead throughout much of the race, only dropping back in the running order during pit stop cycles and restarts. He took the lead for good by passing teammate Andretti on lap 180 and earned the win, which placed him fifth in the championship. It was the first win of the season for a team other than Team Penske or After running a lap down in the first half of the race, Hornish Jr. utilized the AGR drivers' pit strategy and clawed up to second place.

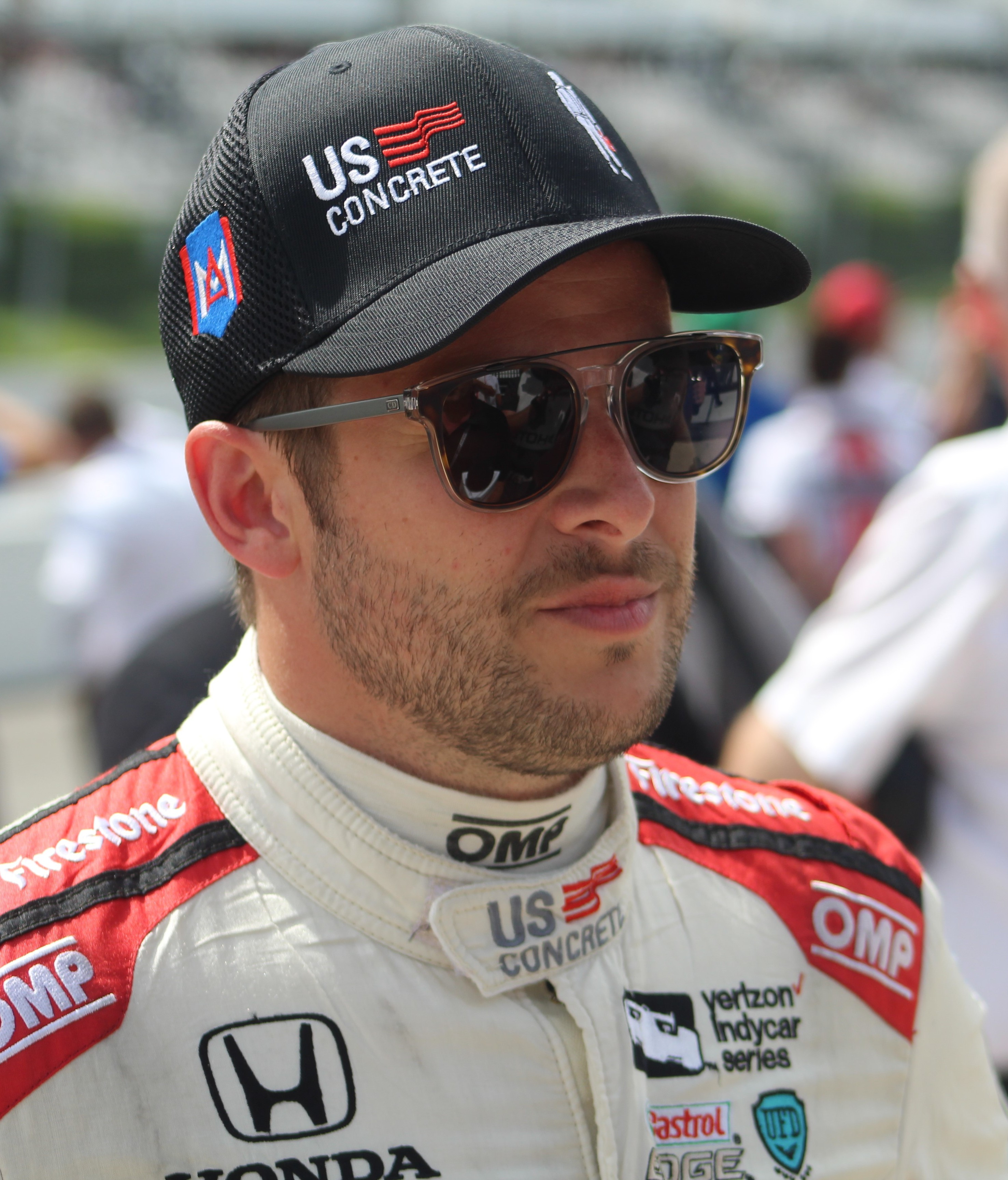
Marco Andretti (pictured in 2018) earned his first IndyCar Series win in the Indy Grand Prix of Sonoma.

Ahead of Michigan International Speedway's Firestone Indy 400, Castroneves and Hornish Jr. qualified on the front row once again and devised a plan to run nose-to-tail with each other in the race, which was delayed by two-and-a-half hours due to rain. The plan executed well until Hornish Jr. was set back by persistent engine issues and retired from the race on lap 73. At this point, Meira took control of the race and held the lead until a round of green-flag pit stops shuffled Castroneves to the first position and Meira to second on lap 134. Meira made a valiant effort to close the gap, but it was in vain, as Castroneves scored the victory and retook the championship lead.

Castroneves and Hornish Jr. started in the first and second positions for the Meijer Indy 300 at Kentucky Speedway, marking the third consecutive race this occurred. They traded the lead several times before pitting on lap 56; however, a poorly timed caution placed them several positions in arrears, allowing Wheldon and Dixon to take the lead. Castroneves and Hornish Jr. gradually climbed up through the field, and by lap 96, Hornish Jr. passed Meira shortly after a restart to reclaim the first position. Over the next 90 laps, Hornish Jr., Wheldon, and Bryan Herta (who made pit stops out of sequence from the leaders) intensely battled for the lead. Wheldon overshot the entry to his pit stall during his final stop on lap 185, which ultimately cost him a shot at the victory. After a caution was issued with less than ten laps remaining, Hornish Jr. overtook Dixon on lap 196 to earn the victory and the championship lead by seven points over Castroneves.

The penultimate round and final road course race of the season, the Indy Grand Prix of Sonoma, saw competitors use various pit stop strategies to converse fuel. Pole-sitter Dixon's strategy worked most efficiently at first, as he led the first 40 of the first 50 laps, but fell to 12th after the air jack of his tire changer malfunctioned during a pit stop. Andretti subsequently took the lead on lap 51, although he tried to save fuel while being pursued by teammate Franchitti. Andretti was greatly assisted by a late caution period and he achieved his first IndyCar Series victory; in doing so, he became the youngest winner in American open-wheel car racing history, a record which was eventually surpassed by Graham Rahal in the 2008 Honda Grand Prix of St. Petersburg.

=== Season finale ===
Heading into the final round of the season, the Peak Antifreeze Indy 300 at Chicagoland, four drivers—Castroneves, Hornish Jr., Wheldon, and Dixon—were all mathematically eligible to win the title. Coincidentally, the four title contenders qualified in the top four positions, with Hornish Jr. occupying the pole position. The race was mainly contested between CGR teammates Dixon and Wheldon, the latter of whom led a race-high 166 laps, while Hornish Jr. comfortably ran in third place. Wheldon's win was solidified after Dixon made slight contact with his right-rear tire, forcing Dixon to back off. With Wheldon finishing first and Hornish Jr. third, the two drivers were tied for the Drivers' Championship. The title was given to Hornish Jr. by virtue of his four wins in the season to Wheldon's two. Castroneves received a penalty early in the race for speeding on pit road and was unable to defend his championship lead; he ultimately finished third, two points behind Hornish Jr. and Wheldon, while Dixon remained fourth.

The championship celebration was hosted at Indianapolis Motor Speedway on September 11, 2006. Hornish Jr. and team owner Roger Penske received a Mini IRL Cup for winning the championship. In addition, Hornish Jr. was awarded the Bosch Platinum Award for being the highest-finishing driver in the standings to use Bosch spark plugs and the Marlboro Pole Award for earning the most pole positions of the season. Andretti collected the Rookie of the Year and Rising Star awards.

=== Post-season testing ===
On September 26–27, five drivers (Dixon, Hornish Jr., Kanaan, Meira, and Wheldon) ran four cars in a highly anticipated test on the ten-turn, 2.73 mi (4.39 km) road course configuration of Daytona International Speedway in order to determine if the circuit was compatible for testing in warm weather and to assess the ethanol-powered engines for 2007. It was the first time American open-wheel cars drove on the track since the 1959 USAC Daytona 100, in which Marshall Teague and George Amick were killed in separate accidents. The second day featured numerous incidents around the track, including Meira spinning into the wall while exiting the back stretch chicane, so track officials added an additional left and right turn in the circuit's infield portion. The test was deemed a success, and rumors spread of a possible IndyCar Series race on the Daytona road course during Speedweeks in 2008, though this ultimately never materialized.

Firestone hosted a private testing session at Indianapolis Motor Speedway on October 2 and 3 for their different tire compounds. On the second day, Jeff Simmons crashed into the turn-two wall, but was uninjured. One week later, Meira and Scott Sharp tested at Iowa Speedway in anticipation for the series' inaugural event at the track in 2007.

== Results and standings ==
=== Races ===
Round	Race	Pole position	Fastest lap	Most laps led	Race winner			Report
Round	Race	Pole position	Fastest lap	Most laps led	Driver	Team	Chassis	Report
1	(United States) Homestead	(United States) Sam Hornish Jr.	(New Zealand) Scott Dixon	(United States) Sam Hornish Jr.	(United Kingdom) Dan Wheldon	Chip Ganassi Racing	Dallara	Report
2	(United States) St. Petersburg	(United Kingdom) Dario Franchitti	(Brazil) Tony Kanaan	(Brazil) Hélio Castroneves	(Brazil) Hélio Castroneves	Team Penske	Dallara	Report
3	(Japan) Motegi	(Brazil) Hélio Castroneves	(New Zealand) Scott Dixon	(Brazil) Hélio Castroneves	(Brazil) Hélio Castroneves	Team Penske	Dallara	Report
4	(United States) Indianapolis	(United States) Sam Hornish Jr.	(New Zealand) Scott Dixon	(United Kingdom) Dan Wheldon	(United States) Sam Hornish Jr.	Team Penske	Dallara	Report
5	(United States) Watkins Glen	(Brazil) Hélio Castroneves	(United States) Marco Andretti	(United Kingdom) Dan Wheldon	(New Zealand) Scott Dixon	Chip Ganassi Racing	Panoz	Report
6	(United States) Texas	(United States) Sam Hornish Jr.	(United Kingdom) Dan Wheldon	(United Kingdom) Dan Wheldon	(Brazil) Hélio Castroneves	Team Penske	Dallara	Report
7	(United States) Richmond	(Brazil) Hélio Castroneves	(Brazil) Hélio Castroneves	(United States) Sam Hornish Jr.	(United States) Sam Hornish Jr.	Team Penske	Dallara	Report
8	(United States) Kansas	(United Kingdom) Dan Wheldon	(Brazil) Hélio Castroneves	(United States) Sam Hornish Jr.	(United States) Sam Hornish Jr.	Team Penske	Dallara	Report
9	(United States) Nashville	(United Kingdom) Dan Wheldon	(United Kingdom) Dan Wheldon	(United Kingdom) Dan Wheldon	(New Zealand) Scott Dixon	Chip Ganassi Racing	Dallara	Report
10	(United States) Milwaukee	(Brazil) Hélio Castroneves	(South Africa) Tomas Scheckter	(Brazil) Tony Kanaan	(Brazil) Tony Kanaan	Andretti Green Racing	Dallara	Report
11	(United States) Michigan	(Brazil) Hélio Castroneves	(Japan) Kosuke Matsuura	(Brazil) Vítor Meira	(Brazil) Hélio Castroneves	Team Penske	Dallara	Report
12	(United States) Kentucky	(Brazil) Hélio Castroneves	(United States) Bryan Herta	(United Kingdom) Dan Wheldon	(United States) Sam Hornish Jr.	Team Penske	Dallara	Report
13	(United States) Sonoma	(New Zealand) Scott Dixon	(Brazil) Tony Kanaan	(New Zealand) Scott Dixon	(United States) Marco Andretti	Andretti Green Racing	Dallara	Report
14	(United States) Chicagoland	(United States) Sam Hornish Jr.	(United States) Sam Hornish Jr.	(United Kingdom) Dan Wheldon	(United Kingdom) Dan Wheldon	Chip Ganassi Racing	Dallara	Report

=== Scoring system ===
Points were awarded to the competitors of each race using the following structure:

Position	**1st**	**2nd**	**3rd**	**4th**	**5th**	**6th**	**7th**	**8th**	**9th**	**10th**	**11th**	**12th**	**13th**	**14th**	**15th**	**16th**	**17th**	**18th–24th**	**25th–33rd**	**MLL**
Points	50	40	35	32	30	28	26	24	22	20	19	18	17	16	15	14	13	12	10	3

In the event that a driver participated in an event but could not start the race, the driver and its entry would be classified in the final starting position and receive half-points. Tiebreakers in points standings were determined by the number of wins a driver earned, followed by second-place finishes, third-place finishes, etc., and then by number of pole positions, followed by number of times qualified second, etc.

=== Drivers' Championship standings ===
Pos.	Driver	HOM	STP	MOT	IND	WGL	TMS	RIC	KAN	NSS	MIL	MIS	KEN	SON	CHI	Points
1	(United States) Sam Hornish Jr.	**3***	8	4	**1**	12	**4**	1*	1*	14	2	19	1	9	**3**	475
2	(United Kingdom) Dan Wheldon	1	16	2	4*	15*	3*	9	**2**	**2***	8	3	4*	6	1*	475
3	(Brazil) Hélio Castroneves	2	1*	**1***	25	**7**	1	**10**	6	5	**14**	**1**	**3**	5	4	473
4	(New Zealand) Scott Dixon	5	2	9	6	1	2	11	4	1	10	16	2	**4***	2	460
5	(Brazil) Vítor Meira	16	5	10	10	2	6	2	3	3	15	2*	6	3	6	411
6	(Brazil) Tony Kanaan	11	3	3	5	11	7	18	5	12	1*	4	5	11	7	384
7	(United States) Marco Andretti	15	15	12	2	16	14	4	9	8	5	8	17	1	18	325
8	(United Kingdom) Dario Franchitti	4	**19**	11	7	14	13	3	12	6	6	12	9	2		311
9	(United States) Danica Patrick	WD	6	8	8	8	12	15	11	4	4	17	8	8	12	302
10	(South Africa) Tomas Scheckter	9	12	13	27	10	10	7	7	15	3	5	7	17	10	298
11	(United States) Bryan Herta	13	4	6	20	13	11	6	13	11	7	11	10	10	15	289
12	(United States) Scott Sharp	7	10	16	9	9	5	5	18	17	12	6	16	14	9	287
13	(Japan) Kosuke Matsuura	6	7	7	15	18	8	12	8	13	17	9	19	13	11	273
14	(United States) Ed Carpenter	WD		20	11	6	9	8	16	10	16	7	11	12	5	252
15	(United States) Buddy Rice	WD	13	5	26	4	18	13	17	16	11	13	15	15	13	234
16	(United States) Jeff Simmons			18	23	19	15	19	10	7	9	10	14	7	8	217
17	(Brazil) Felipe Giaffone	8	9	15	21	5	16	17	19							142
18	(United States) Buddy Lazier	14	14	14	12		19	16	15			15				122
19	(United States) Eddie Cheever	10	11		13	17	17	14	14							114
20	(United States) Jeff Bucknum				32					18	13	14	13	18	17	97
21	(Australia) Ryan Briscoe					3				9	18			16		83
22	(United States) P. J. Chesson	12	17	17	33											54
23	(Canada) Marty Roth				DNQ							18	18		19	36
24	(United States) Michael Andretti				3											35
25	(United States) Sarah Fisher												12		16	32
26	(United States) A. J. Foyt IV														14	16
27	(Italy) Max Papis				14											16
28	(United States) Roger Yasukawa				16											14
29	(United States) Jaques Lazier				17											13
30	(Brazil) Roberto Moreno		18													12
31	(Brazil) Airton Daré				18											12
32	(Czech Republic) Tomáš Enge			19												12
33	(United States) P. J. Jones				19											12
34	(United States) Townsend Bell				22											12
35	(United States) Al Unser Jr.				24											12
36	(Netherlands) Arie Luyendyk Jr.				28											10
37	(France) Stéphan Grégoire				29											10
38	(United States) Larry Foyt				30											10
39	(Brazil) Thiago Medeiros				31											10
40	(United States) Paul Dana	DNS^{†}														6
—	(United States) Jon Herb				Wth											0
Pos.	Driver	HOM	STP	MOT	IND	WGL	TMS	RIC	KAN	NSS	MIL	MIS	KEN	SON	CHI	Points

Key
Color	Result
Gold	Winner
Silver	Second place
Bronze	Third place
Green	Fourth–tenth place
Blue	Other finishing position (Outside top ten)
Purple	Did not finish
Red	Did not qualify (DNQ)
Brown	Withdrawn (Wth)
Black	Disqualified (DSQ)
White	Did not start (DNS)
White	Entry withdraw (WD)
Blank	Did not participate
In-line notation	Meaning
**Bold**	Pole position
Italics	Fastest lap
*	Most race laps led
†	Fatal accident

=== Rookie of the Year standings ===
Pos.	Driver	HOM	STP	MOT	IND	WGL	TMS	RIC	KAN	NSS	MIL	MIS	KEN	SON	CHI	Points
1	(United States) Marco Andretti	15	15	12	2	16	14	4	9	8	5	8	17	1	18	325
2	(United States) Jeff Simmons			18	23	19	15	19	10	7	9	10	14	7	8	217
3	(United States) P. J. Chesson	12	17	17	33											54
4	(Canada) Marty Roth				DNQ							18	18		19	36
5	(United States) Larry Foyt				30											10
6	(Brazil) Thiago Medeiros				31											10
7	(United States) Paul Dana	DNS^{†}														6
Pos.	Driver	HOM	STP	MOT	IND	WGL	TMS	RIC	KAN	NSS	MIL	MIS	KEN	SON	CHI	Points

=== Entrant standings ===
Pos.	No.	Team	HOM	STP	MOT	IND	WGL	TMS	RIC	KAN	NSS	MIL	MIS	KEN	SON	CHI	Points
1	6	Team Penske	**3***	8	4	**1**	12	**4**	1*	1*	14	2	19	1	9	**3**	475
2	10	Chip Ganassi Racing	1	16	2	4*	15*	3*	9	**2**	**2***	8	3	4*	6	1*	475
3	3	Team Penske	2	1*	**1***	25	**7**	1	**10**	6	5	**14**	**1**	**3**	5	4	473
4	9	Chip Ganassi Racing	5	2	9	6	1	2	11	4	1	10	16	2	**4***	2	460
5	4	Panther Racing	16	5	10	10	2	6	2	3	3	15	2*	6	3	6	411
6	11	Andretti Green Racing	11	3	3	5	11	7	18	5	12	1*	4	5	11	7	384
7	27	Andretti Green Racing	4	**19**	11	7	14	13	3	12	6	6	12	9	2	14	327
8	26	Andretti Green Racing	15	15	12	2	16	14	4	9	8	5	8	17	1	18	325
9	16	Rahal Letterman Racing	DNS	6	8	8	8	12	15	11	4	4	17	8	8	12	302
10	2	Vision Racing	9	12	13	27	10	10	7	7	15	3	5	7	17	10	298
11	7	Andretti Green Racing	13	4	6	20	13	11	6	13	11	7	11	10	10	15	289
12	8	Fernández Racing	7	10	16	9	9	5	5	18	17	12	6	16	14	9	287
13	55	Fernández Racing	6	7	7	15	18	8	12	8	13	17	9	19	13	11	273
14	20	Vision Racing	DNS	18	20	11	6	9	8	16	10	16	7	11	12	5	264
15	5	Dreyer & Reinbold Racing	14	14	14	12	3	19	16	15	9	18	15	12	16	16	237
16	15	Rahal Letterman Racing	DNS	13	5	26	4	18	13	17	16	11	13	15	15	13	234
17	14	A. J. Foyt Racing	8	9	15	21	5	16	17	19	18	13	14	13	18	17	229
18	17	Rahal Letterman Racing	DNS		18	23	19	15	19	10	7	9	10	14	7	8	223
19	51	Cheever Racing	10	11	19	13	17	17	14	14							126
20	91	Hemelgarn Racing	12	17	17	33											54
21	25	Roth Racing				DNQ							18	18		19	36
22	1	Andretti Green Racing				3											35
23	52	Cheever Racing				14											16
24	12	Playa Del Racing				16											14
25	21	Playa Del Racing				17											13
26	88	Sam Schmidt Motorsports				18											12
27	90	Vision Racing				22											12
28	31	Dreyer & Reinbold Racing				24											12
29	98	Curb-Agajanian-Beck Motorsports				19											12
30	92	Hemelgarn Racing				33											10
31	41	A. J. Foyt Racing				30											10
32	61	Luyendyk Racing				28											10
33	18	PDM Racing				31											10
34	97	Team Leader-Curb-Agajanian-Beck Motorsports				29											10
Pos.	No.	Team	HOM	STP	MOT	IND	WGL	TMS	RIC	KAN	NSS	MIL	MIS	KEN	SON	CHI	Points

=== Chassis manufacturer standings ===
The highest-finishing entry for a chassis manufacturer scored points for the manufacturers' championship.

Pos.	Manufacturer	HOM	STP	MOT	IND	WGL	TMS	RIC	KAN	NSS	MIL	MIS	KEN	SON	CHI	Points
1	(Italy) Dallara	1	1	1	1	2	1	1	1	1	1	1	1	1	1	137
1	(Italy) Dallara	10	10	10	10	7	10	10	10	10	10	10	10	10	10	137
2	(United States) Panoz	DNS	2	5	8	1	—	—	—	—	—	—	—	4	—	45
2	(United States) Panoz	7	7	7	7	10	0	0	0	0	0	0	0	7	0	45
Pos.	Manufacturer	HOM	STP	MOT	IND	WGL	TMS	RIC	KAN	NSS	MIL	MIS	KEN	SON	CHI	Points

== Bibliography ==
- Higham, Peter (1995). "IndyCar Championship". The Guinness Guide to International Motor Racing. London, England: Motorbooks International. ISBN 978-0-7603-0152-4 – via Internet Archive.
