= 2006 Indy Grand Prix of Sonoma =

IndyCar race held in Sonoma, California

(United States) 2006 Indy Grand Prix of Sonoma
Race details
- Race 13 of 14 in the 2006 IndyCar season
- Date: August 27, 2006
- Official name: Indy Grand Prix of Sonoma
- Location: Infineon Raceway, Sonoma, California, United States
- Course: Permanent racing facility 2.260 mi / 3.637 km
- Distance: 80 laps 180.800 mi / 290.969 km

Pole position
- Driver: (New Zealand) Scott Dixon (Chip Ganassi Racing)
- Time: 1:17.0344

Fastest lap
- Driver: (Brazil) Tony Kanaan (Andretti Green Racing)
- Time: 1:18.6820 (on lap 43 of 80)

Podium
- First: (United States) Marco Andretti (Andretti Green Racing)
- Second: (United Kingdom) Dario Franchitti (Andretti Green Racing)
- Third: (Brazil) Vítor Meira (Panther Racing)

The 2006 Indy Grand Prix of Sonoma was an IRL IndyCar Series open-wheel race held on August 27, 2006, in Sonoma, California at Infineon Raceway. It was the 13th round of the 2006 IRL IndyCar Series and the second running of the event. Andretti Green Racing driver Marco Andretti won the 80-lap race. Andretti's teammate Dario Franchitti finished second and Vítor Meira of Panther Racing finished third.

Scott Dixon won the pole position by posting the fastest lap of qualifying. He led the first 28 laps before making a pit stop, giving the lead to teammate Dan Wheldon. Dixon reclaimed the lead after Wheldon made a stop ten laps later. Andretti, who adopted a fuel-saving strategy, made his final stop on lap 45 and took the lead six laps later as Dixon was hindered by a slow pit stop. Andretti led the final 30 laps and, with the assistance of a late caution, managed to conserve his fuel on his way to his first IndyCar Series victory. He had also become the youngest driver to win an American open-wheel car race. This record was later beaten in 2008.

The final result gave Hélio Castroneves the first position in the Drivers' Championship once again, leading teammate Sam Hornish Jr. by one point. Wheldon, Dixon, and Meira remained third through fifth with one race left in the season.

== Background ==
Infineon Raceway (pictured in 2009), where the race was held.

The Indy Grand Prix of Sonoma was the 13th of 14 scheduled open-wheel races for the 2006 IRL IndyCar Series and the second edition of the event dating back to 2005. It was held on August 27, 2006, in Sonoma, California, United States, at Infineon Raceway, a twelve-turn 2.26 mi (3.64 km) permanent road course circuit, and contested over 80 laps and 180.8 miles (291.0 km). Before the race, Marlboro Team Penske driver Sam Hornish Jr. was leading the Drivers' Championship with 418 points, seven more than teammate Hélio Castroneves in second. Chip Ganassi Racing (CGR) drivers Dan Wheldon and Scott Dixon occupied the next two positions with 394 and 385 points, respectively, and Vítor Meira, driving for Panther Racing, was fifth with 348 points. Tony Kanaan was the race's defending champion.

After a last-place finish in the race at Michigan dropped Hornish Jr. to second in the championship, he managed to reclaim the championship lead by winning the preceding race at Kentucky. Hornish Jr. and Castroneves agreed that Infineon Raceway was "challenging" for drivers because of its multiple elevation changes and aimed to finish well in order to stay in contention for the final race of the season at Chicagoland Speedway. Wheldon and Dixon saw the upcoming race at Infineon as an opportunity to narrow Hornish Jr.'s points advantage over them, with Wheldon predicting that strategies to maintain fuel would lead to an unexpected winner. Meira acknowledged that the race weekend was "make-or-break" for him and his team, but assured he would have a good result.

For the first time since the Watkins Glen Indy Grand Prix in June, three teams (CGR, Rahal Letterman Racing, and Fernández Racing) switched from their usual Dallara-built chassis to the Panoz-built chassis. Buddy Rice, Danica Patrick, and Jeff Simmons all stated that the Rahal Letterman Racing team had familiarized themselves with their racing setup on road courses.

== Practice and qualifying ==
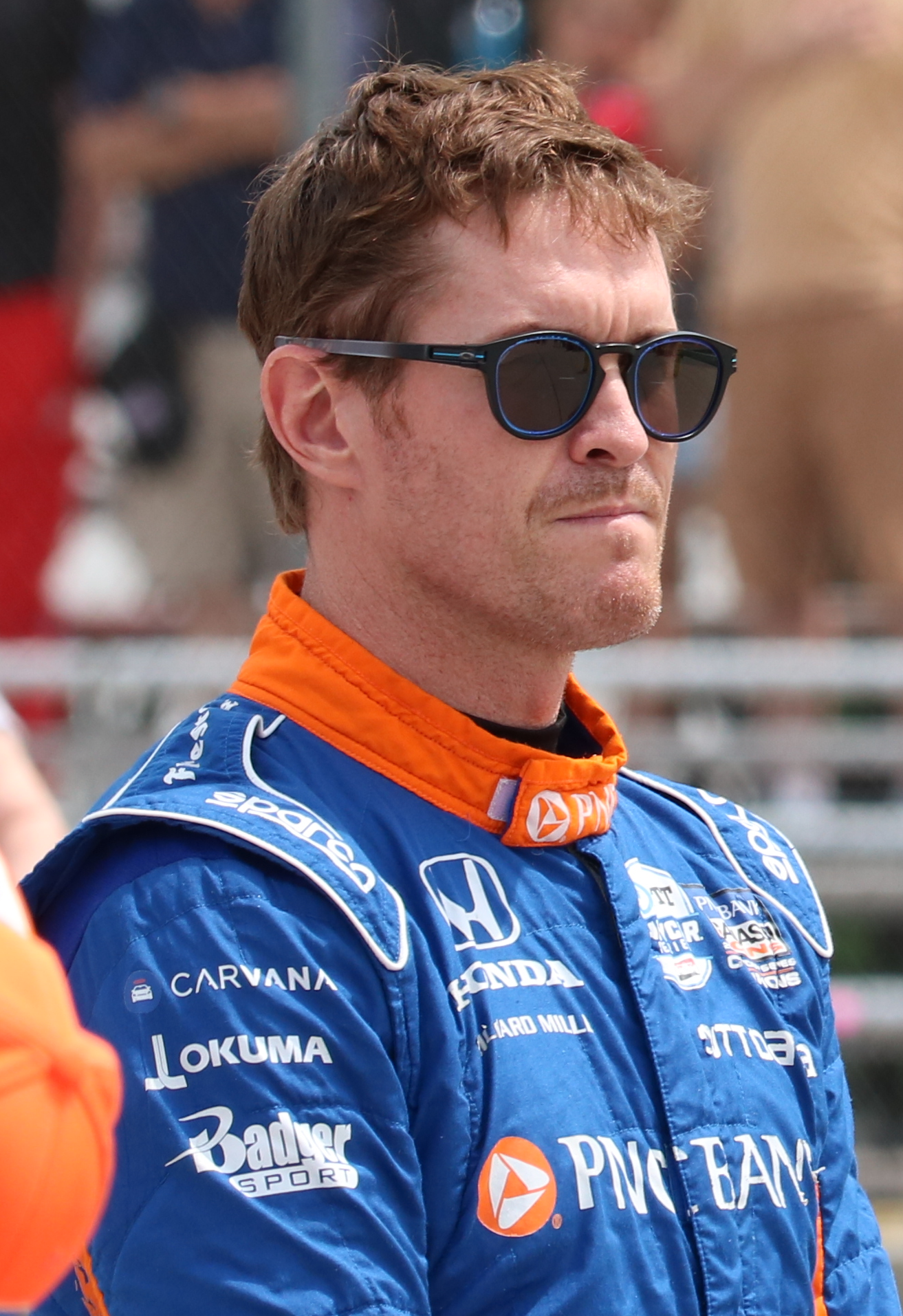
Scott Dixon (pictured in 2021) won his sixth career pole position.

Four practice sessions preceded the race on Sunday, two on Friday and two on Saturday. The first session lasted for 120 minutes, the second and third 65 minutes, and the fourth 30 minutes. Under the IndyCar series' qualifying procedure, each participant was permitted to put down laps during the initial session; their times would determine the two groups which would be utilized in the next two sessions, which were split into 30 minutes each with a five-minute break. The driver with the fastest overall lap on Friday would then decide if the single-lap qualifying order shall proceed with the fastest driver first and the slowest driver last, or if the qualifying order shall be inverted.

Conditions during Friday's practice sessions were dry and cloudy. Castroneves was fastest in the first session on Friday morning with a time of 1:17.3686, two-tenths of a second quicker than Wheldon, who was next quickest. Dixon, Bryan Herta, and Dario Franchitti took positions third through fifth. The session featured several stoppages for spins involving Wheldon, Scott Sharp, Ed Carpenter, Ryan Briscoe, Simmons, and Dixon, all of whom suffered little to no damage. Late in the session, Castroneves and Carpenter collided at the entrance of pit road. In the second session on Friday afternoon, Dixon improved on Castroneves' time from the previous session and set the fastest lap of the day at 1:16.9073, thus giving him the option to choose whether to maintain or invert the qualifying order. Castroneves, who was two-tenths of a second slower than Dixon, took second. Franchitti, Marco Andretti, and Herta rounded out the top five. Jeff Bucknum, Meira, and Franchitti spun off-course in separate incidents without damaging their cars. On Saturday morning, Castroneves continued showcasing his speed in the third session with a fastest time of 1:16.6075, beating Dixon by nearly two-tenths of a second; Kanaan, Wheldon, and Herta were third through fifth. The session was stopped three times for non-contact spins involving Carpenter, Bucknum, and Meira.

Qualifying was held on Saturday under partly cloudy conditions. The session was separated into two rounds. In the first round, each driver would record a single timed lap around the circuit; with Dixon opting to invert the qualifying order, Carpenter (the slowest driver of Friday's practice sessions) was the first driver to put down a lap. The six fastest competitors of the first round would advance to the Firestone Fast Six, a ten-minute group qualifying session which determined the first three rows of the starting grid. Dixon clinched the sixth pole position of his IndyCar Series career and his first since 2003 with a timed lap of 1:17.0344. After qualifying, Dixon said he was grateful to have won the pole position, but admitted he was slightly lucky. He was joined on the grid's front row by Andretti, who was five-hundredths of a second slower in what was the best qualifying result of his career thus far. The rest of the top-six starting positions were filled by Castroneves, Kanaan, Franchitti, and Wheldon. Briscoe, the pole position winner of the previous race at Sonoma, was the fastest driver not to advance into the final session in seventh. Meira and Herta took the next two positions, while Hornish Jr. experienced oversteer and qualified tenth. Patrick, Rice, Kosuke Matsuura, Simmons, Bucknum, Carpenter, and Sharp qualified in positions 11th through 17th. Occupying the 18th and final starting position, Tomas Scheckter suffered an electrical issue during his warm-up lap and was disallowed from making another qualifying attempt.

During the final practice session on Saturday evening, Dixon set the fastest time at 1:18.5573, two-tenths of a second quicker than Kanaan in second place. The top-five positions were rounded out by Castroneves, Herta, and Andretti. The caution flag was flown twice during the session when Sharp and Briscoe spun in separate incidents. Briscoe, who spun in turn two, nearly collided with Andretti and sustained suspension damage. Scheckter was substituted by Townsend Bell after complaining of shoulder discomfort, but was still cleared to race on Sunday.

=== Qualifying classification ===
Pos	No.	Driver	Team	Time	Speed	Grid
1	9	(New Zealand) Scott Dixon	Chip Ganassi Racing	1:17.0344	107.484	1
2	26	(United States) Marco Andretti	Andretti Green Racing	1:17.0830	107.417	2
3	3	(Brazil) Hélio Castroneves	Team Penske	1:17.2127	107.236	3
4	11	(Brazil) Tony Kanaan	Andretti Green Racing	1:17.2320	107.209	4
5	27	(United Kingdom) Dario Franchitti	Andretti Green Racing	1:17.2893	107.130	5
6	10	(United Kingdom) Dan Wheldon	Chip Ganassi Racing	1:17.5946	106.708	6
7	5	(Australia) Ryan Briscoe	Dreyer & Reinbold Racing	1:18.2612	105.800	7
8	4	(Brazil) Vítor Meira	Panther Racing	1:18.3012	105.746	8
9	7	(United States) Bryan Herta	Andretti Green Racing	1:18.3510	105.678	9
10	6	(United States) Sam Hornish Jr.	Team Penske	1:18.5940	105.352	10
11	16	(United States) Danica Patrick	Rahal Letterman Racing	1:19.0287	104.772	11
12	15	(United States) Buddy Rice	Rahal Letterman Racing	1:19.2128	104.529	12
13	55	(Japan) Kosuke Matsuura	Fernández Racing	1:19.2421	104.490	13
14	17	(United States) Jeff Simmons	Rahal Letterman Racing	1:19.5633	104.068	14
15	14	(United States) Jeff Bucknum	A. J. Foyt Racing	1:20.0960	103.376	15
16	20	(United States) Ed Carpenter	Vision Racing	1:20.3379	103.065	16
17	8	(United States) Scott Sharp	Fernández Racing	1:21.6590	101.397	17
18	2	(South Africa) Tomas Scheckter	Vision Racing	—	—	18

== Race ==
Live television coverage of the race began at 12:30 p.m. Pacific Daylight Time (UTC−07:00) in the United States on ESPN. Commentary was provided by Marty Reid, Rusty Wallace, and Scott Goodyear. Unlike the past two days, weather conditions ahead of the race were sunny, with air temperatures reaching 71 °F (22 °C) and track temperatures measuring at 117 °F (47 °C). Johnny Rutherford, three-time winner of the Indianapolis 500, commanded drivers to start their engines and drove the pace car.

As the race began, Dixon utilized the pole position to his advantage and pulled away from the other competitors as Scheckter climbed from 18th to 14th. Dixon held a 1.9-second lead over Andretti on the fifth lap, which gradually widened to three seconds by lap 10. The following lap, the first caution flag of the race was issued when Simmons ran into the right-rear of Bucknum's car, which spun out in turn 11. Some drivers, including Wheldon and Hornish Jr., made pit stops for new tires and fuel during the caution. The top-nine leaders chose to stay on the track, and Dixon led the field back up to speed on the lap-14 restart, followed by Marco Andretti and Castroneves. That same lap, Matsuura bumped Briscoe off-track in the ninth turn, sending Briscoe back to the tenth position. Meanwhile, Scheckter entered pit road on lap 18 to replace a flat tire.

Green-flag pit stops began on lap 24. Dixon made his stop five laps later along with Andretti, Kanaan, and Franchitti, allowing Wheldon to take the lead. Wheldon maintained the first position until he pitted on lap 39 (by which point most of the drivers had made their pit stops), giving the lead back to teammate Dixon. On lap 44, Rice spun out Matsuura in turn 11, necessitating the second caution. Andretti, Kanaan, and Wheldon chose to make pit stops under the caution, and Rice's team replaced his front wing which had been damaged after making contact with Matsuura. Dixon, employing a different strategy from that of the other leaders, remained on track and led on the lap-47 restart. The third caution was issued three laps later when debris was left on the track after Wheldon and Simmons collided in turn nine.

Most of the leaders again made pit stops, with the exception of Andretti, who assumed the lead on the 51st lap. Dixon's pit stop was elongated when an air jack malfunctioned, temporarily preventing his left-front tire changer from swapping his tire; he resultantly rejoined the track in 12th place. As Andretti led at the lap-52 restart, Hornish Jr. spun in the second turn as he exited pit road, though the race remained under green-flag conditions. Andretti held a four-second lead by lap 65. Two laps later, Meira spun Briscoe out in the seventh turn. With Briscoe quickly continuing on, no caution was thrown. On the 71st lap, Franchitti overtook teammate Kanaan for second place and began closing the gap on Andretti. Herta spun in the seventh turn on lap 73, bringing out the fourth (and final) caution of the race.

The caution period greatly helped Andretti in his efforts to maintain his fuel. He led at the restart on lap 75, followed by Franchitti and Kanaan, and held the lead for the remaining five laps to earn his first career IndyCar Series win. In doing so, Andretti became the youngest driver to win an American open-wheel car race at 19 years, 5 months, and 14 days old. (Note: The record was previously set by Jimmy Davies in 1949. Graham Rahal would later surpass Andretti's record at the Streets of St. Petersburg in 2008.) Franchitti again closed the gap from Andretti in the final green-flag stint, but ultimately finished in second place, 0.6557 seconds in arrears. Meira made a daring pass on the final lap to take third place from Dixon and Castroneves, who finished fourth and fifth respectively. Wheldon, Simmons, Patrick, Hornish Jr., and Herta finished sixth through tenth. Kanaan fell to eleventh place, the last driver to finish on the lead lap, after refueling his car on lap 79. Carpenter, Matsuura, Sharp, Rice, and Scheckter were the last of the classified finishers. There were a total of four cautions and three lead changes among three different drivers throughout the course of the race. Dixon's total of 40 laps in the lead was the most of any competitor.

=== Post-race ===
Andretti drove into victory lane to celebrate his win, which earned him $131,400. He had also clinched the Rookie of the Year award, receiving an additional $50,000. Andretti was jubilant and attributed his success to his pit crew, saying: "The guys were brilliant in the pits. They had a plan in the beginning. You know, everything worked. I couldn't be happier because we fulfilled all the goals that we set at the beginning of the year. Rookie of the Year at Indy, the series. We got our win. Definitely it's the best feeling all year for sure." Marco Andretti was praised by his father Michael Andretti, who was proud of Marco for his performance throughout the weekend and admitted he did not want Franchitti to pass Marco. Mario Andretti, Marco's grandfather, also celebrated the victory and agreed that Marco had a "perfect" weekend.

Second-place finisher Franchitti felt that the final caution kept him from winning the race, but congratulated Andretti for what he considered a "deserved" victory. Third-place finisher Meira was thrilled with his late passes on Dixon and Castroneves and lauded his team for his strong performance at the end of the race. Dixon was left disappointed by his team's miscue during his last pit stop, fearing that it may have cost him the championship. Castroneves, on the other hand, was content with finishing fifth. He admitted that he backed off when Meira and Dixon passed him and hoped he would not regret doing so after the season finale at Chicagoland. The final result gave Castroneves the lead in the Drivers' Championship with 441 points, one more than teammate Hornish Jr. in second. Wheldon remained third with 422 points, while teammate Dixon was fourth with 420 and Meira kept fifth with 383 as one race remained in the season.

=== Race classification ===
Pos	No.	Driver	Team	Laps	Time/Retired	Grid	Pts.
1	26	(United States) Marco Andretti	Andretti Green Racing	80	01:58:05.5416	2	50
2	27	(United Kingdom) Dario Franchitti	Andretti Green Racing	80	+0.6557	5	40
3	4	(Brazil) Vítor Meira	Panther Racing	80	+10.6535	8	35
4	9	(New Zealand) Scott Dixon	Chip Ganassi Racing	80	+11.1867	1	35^{1}
5	3	(Brazil) Hélio Castroneves	Team Penske	80	+12.5049	3	30
6	10	(United Kingdom) Dan Wheldon	Chip Ganassi Racing	80	+13.4494	6	28
7	17	(United States) Jeff Simmons	Rahal Letterman Racing	80	+13.8754	14	26
8	16	(United States) Danica Patrick	Rahal Letterman Racing	80	+15.7417	11	24
9	6	(United States) Sam Hornish Jr.	Team Penske	80	+16.3369	10	22
10	7	(United States) Bryan Herta	Andretti Green Racing	80	+18.5571	9	20
11	11	(Brazil) Tony Kanaan	Andretti Green Racing	80	+40.6636	4	19
12	20	(United States) Ed Carpenter	Vision Racing	79	+1 lap	16	18
13	55	(Japan) Kosuke Matsuura	Fernández Racing	79	+1 lap	13	17
14	8	(United States) Scott Sharp	Fernández Racing	79	+1 lap	17	16
15	15	(United States) Buddy Rice	Rahal Letterman Racing	75	+5 laps	12	15
16	5	(Australia) Ryan Briscoe	Dreyer & Reinbold Racing	67	Handling	7	14
17	2	(South Africa) Tomas Scheckter	Vision Racing	44	+36 laps	18	13
18	14	(United States) Jeff Bucknum	A. J. Foyt Racing	9	Handling	15	12

Notes

- ^1 — Includes three bonus points for leading the most laps.

== Championship standings after the race ==
Drivers' Championship standings
	Pos.	Driver	Points
1	1	(Brazil) Hélio Castroneves	441
1	2	(United States) Sam Hornish Jr.	440 (–1)
Unchanged	3	(United Kingdom) Dan Wheldon	422 (–19)
Unchanged	4	(New Zealand) Scott Dixon	420 (–21)
Unchanged	5	(Brazil) Vítor Meira	383 (–58)
Sources:

- Note: Only the top five positions are included.

== Notes and references ==
=== References ===
Previous race: 2006 Meijer Indy 300	IndyCar Series; 2006 season	Next race: 2006 Peak Antifreeze Indy 300
Previous race: 2005 Argent Mortgage Indy Grand Prix	Indy Grand Prix of Sonoma	Next race: 2007 Motorola Indy 300
