= 2006 Indy Japan 300 =

IndyCar race held in Motegi, Japan

Race details
3rd round of the 2006 IndyCar season
← Previous race	Next race →
- Layout of the Twin Ring Motegi circuit
- Date: April 22, 2006
- Official name: Indy Japan 300
- Location: Twin Ring Motegi, Motegi, Japan
- Course: Permanent racing facility 1.520 mi / 2.446 km
- Distance: 200 laps 304.000 mi / 489.241 km

Pole position
- Driver: (Brazil) Hélio Castroneves (Team Penske)
- Time: No time

Fastest lap
- Driver: (New Zealand) Scott Dixon (Chip Ganassi Racing)
- Time: 27.2804 (on lap 171 of 200)

Podium
- First: (Brazil) Hélio Castroneves (Team Penske)
- Second: (United Kingdom) Dan Wheldon (Chip Ganassi Racing)
- Third: (Brazil) Tony Kanaan (Andretti Green Racing)

Chronology
Previous	Next
2005	2007

The 2006 Indy Japan 300 was an IRL IndyCar Series open-wheel race that was held on April 22, 2006, in Motegi, Japan, at Twin Ring Motegi. It was the third round of the 2006 IRL IndyCar Series, the ninth running of the event (fourth under Indy Racing League (IRL) sanctioning), and the only race of the season to be held in Japan. Team Penske driver Hélio Castroneves won the 200-lap race. Dan Wheldon, driving for Chip Ganassi Racing, finished second, and Tony Kanaan finished third for Andretti Green Racing.

Castroneves was awarded the pole position after rainy conditions washed out the qualifying session. He maintained the lead for the first 24 laps before struggling to pass a slower car, handing the lead to Wheldon for five laps. After Tomáš Enge and Ed Carpenter crashed, the leaders entered pit road for fresh tires and fuel, and Castroneves emerged ahead of Wheldon, thus giving him the lead for the next 64 laps. Castroneves pitted again on lap 94, and the lead was swapped among four drivers in the next six laps before he regained the lead again on lap 101. Castroneves continued his pure dominance, leading another 46 consecutive laps before coming in for his final pit stop on lap 147. Scott Dixon, who led five laps and had the momentum to steal the victory, stalled his engine during his final pit stop. Castroneves was not challenged by any other driver and led the final 50 laps en route to his ninth IndyCar Series victory and his second consecutive win of the season.

Castroneves' win allowed him to extend his Drivers' Championship lead with 146 points, 42 more than Wheldon. Dixon's poor result gave him a total of 92 points, falling back to fourth in the standings while Sam Hornish Jr. improved his position to third with 94 points. Kanaan, who overcame an unscheduled pit stop with less than 80 laps to go, maintained the fifth position with 89 points.

== Background ==
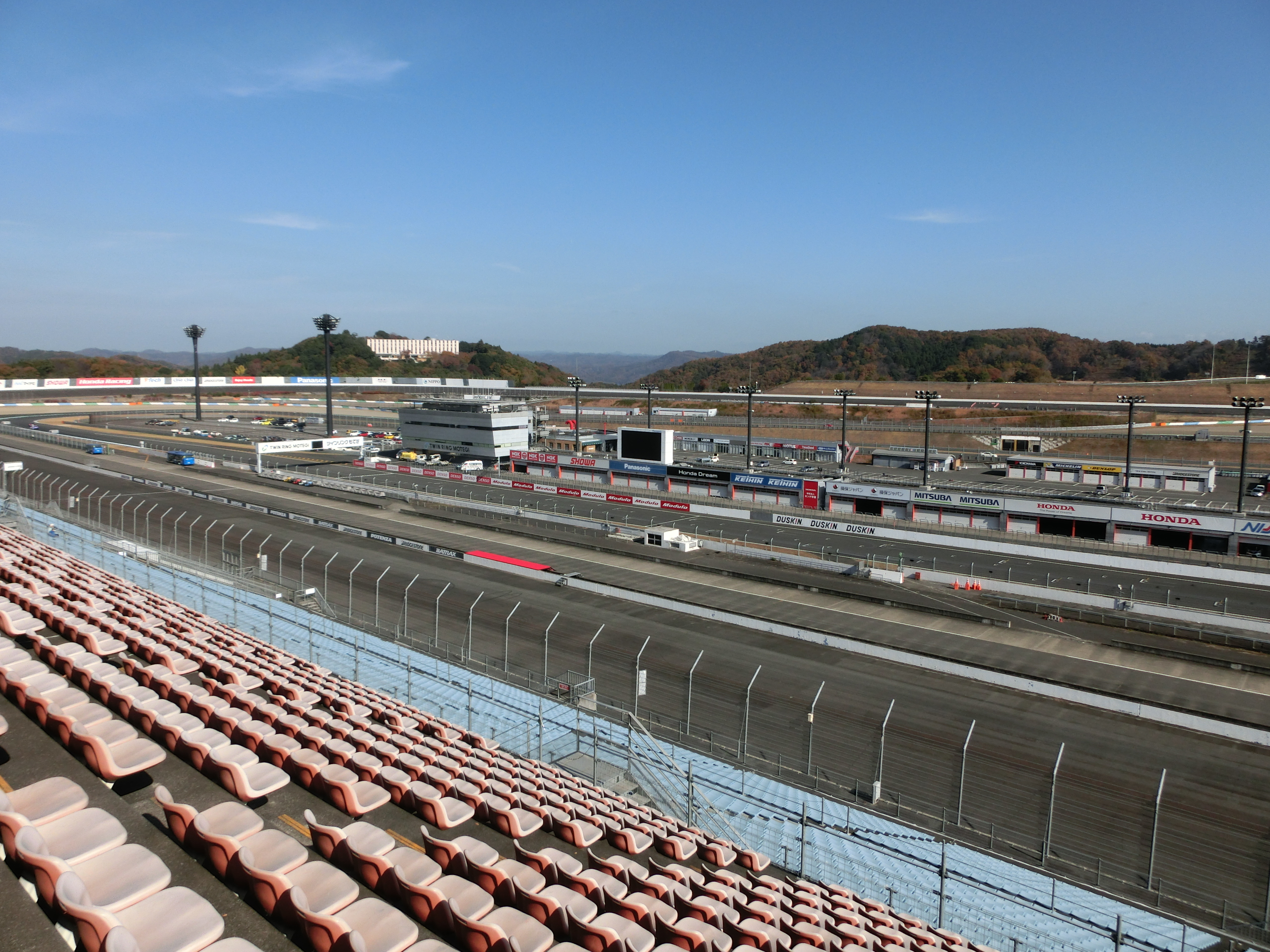
Twin Ring Motegi (pictured in 2020), where the race was held.

The Indy Japan 300 was confirmed to be included in the Indy Racing League (IRL)'s 2006 schedule in September 2005. It was the 3rd of 14 scheduled races for 2006, the ninth annual edition of the event (fourth edition under IRL sanctioning), and the only race of the season to be held outside of the United States. It was held at the Twin Ring Motegi circuit, a four-turn, 1.5 mi (2.4 km) paved oval track in Motegi, Tochigi, Japan. Dan Wheldon was the defending race winner, and was looking to win the race for the third consecutive year, a feat that no driver in the Indy Racing League had done before. Entering the race, Team Penske driver Hélio Castroneves led the Drivers' Championship standings with 93 points. Scott Dixon was in second with 70 points. Wheldon fell to third, only obtaining 64 points. Sam Hornish Jr., with 62 points, was in fourth, and Tony Kanaan and Kosuke Matsuura tied for fifth with 54 points each.

The day before an open test session was conducted for the upcoming Indianapolis 500, Rahal Letterman Racing named Jeff Simmons, a seven-time winner in the Indy Pro Series, as the full-time driver of their No. 17 car for the remainder of the 2006 season, beginning at Motegi. The seat was originally vacated by Paul Dana, though he was killed in a morning warm-up crash prior to the race at Homestead–Miami Speedway. Team co-owner Bobby Rahal explained why Simmons was chosen to replace Dana:

"Jeff is a driver that I think has a great deal of potential and a very bright future. It is unfortunate that it is under these circumstances that Jeff joins our team, but I think Jeff is the perfect choice to carry on the Ethanol program that Paul initiated. Jeff has paid his dues and worked his way up through the ladder system. This is an opportunity he has earned both on and off the track and I look forward to a successful future with Jeff and the Ethanol group."

On April 13, Cheever Racing announced that their No. 51 car, normally driven by Eddie Cheever, would be driven by Tomáš Enge during the event, as Cheever chose to compete in the Grand Am Rolex Sports Car Series race at Virginia International Raceway. Enge later revealed that he received the news while testing a V8 supercar in Australia; he then traveled to his home country, the Czech Republic, to secure a visa for the race, and traveled to Indianapolis to complete paperwork for IndyCar before finally arriving in Japan. This race also marked the return of Ed Carpenter, who was injured at Homestead in the same crash that killed Dana, and was forced to miss the race at St. Petersburg.

== Practice and qualifying ==
Four practice sessions were scheduled to precede the race on Saturday; the first two were scheduled for Thursday (both 90 minutes), and the last two for Friday (90 minutes and 30 minutes). However, rain began falling at the track on Thursday shortly before 10:30 AM local time, forcing the IRL to delay the first practice session. Thursday's schedule was later updated to extend the afternoon practice session to 110 minutes and outright cancel the morning practice session. Castroneves set the fastest lap of the session with a time of 27.1937 seconds, ahead of Kanaan, Hornish Jr., Tomas Scheckter, and Scott Sharp. The only incident of the day occurred at 4:41 PM local time, when Hornish Jr. slammed into the SAFER barriers with the rear of his car in turns three and four. Hornish Jr. was uninjured, and later said that the back end of his car just snapped loose entering the third turn.

On Friday, the track was again drenched in heavy rainfall, and IRL officials cancelled the morning practice session and the qualifying session. The starting grid was determined by entrant points because officials felt that the second group of drivers did not receive equal practice time, and thus, Castroneves was awarded the pole position for the tenth time in his career. At 2:30 PM local time, the twenty drivers took to the now-dried track for their final practice session, which had been lengthened to 90 minutes. Once again, Castroneves topped the speed charts for the session with a fastest time of 27.1464 seconds, ahead of Wheldon, Sharp, Buddy Rice, and Kosuke Matsuura. Simmons was involved in the only incident of the day when his car slammed the barriers in turn four and came to rest alongside the inside barrier with 14 minutes remaining. Simmons was uninjured, though the car was destroyed and his team resorted to a back-up car.

=== Qualifying classification ===
Key	Meaning
R	Rookie
W	Past winner

Pos	No.	Driver	Team	Chassis	Final grid
1	3	(Brazil) Hélio Castroneves	Team Penske	Dallara	1
2	9	(New Zealand) Scott Dixon	Chip Ganassi Racing	Dallara	2
3	10	(United Kingdom) Dan Wheldon W	Chip Ganassi Racing	Dallara	3
4	6	(United States) Sam Hornish Jr.	Team Penske	Dallara	4
5	11	(Brazil) Tony Kanaan	Andretti Green Racing	Dallara	5
6	55	(Japan) Kosuke Matsuura	Fernández Racing	Dallara	6
7	7	(United States) Bryan Herta	Andretti Green Racing	Dallara	7
8	8	(United States) Scott Sharp W	Fernández Racing	Dallara	8
9	14	(Brazil) Felipe Giaffone	A. J. Foyt Racing	Dallara	9
10	27	(United Kingdom) Dario Franchitti	Andretti Green Racing	Dallara	10
11	4	(Brazil) Vítor Meira	Panther Racing	Dallara	11
12	2	(South Africa) Tomas Scheckter	Vision Racing	Dallara	12
13	51	(Czech Republic) Tomáš Enge	Cheever Racing	Dallara	13
14	16	(United States) Danica Patrick	Rahal Letterman Racing	Panoz	14
15	5	(United States) Buddy Lazier	Dreyer & Reinbold Racing	Dallara	15
16	91	(United States) P. J. Chesson R	Hemelgarn Racing	Dallara	16
17	26	(United States) Marco Andretti R	Andretti Green Racing	Dallara	17
18	15	(United States) Buddy Rice	Rahal Letterman Racing	Panoz	18
19	20	(United States) Ed Carpenter	Vision Racing	Dallara	19
20	17	(United States) Jeff Simmons R	Rahal Letterman Racing	Panoz	20
Official starting lineup

== Race ==
The race began on Saturday, April 22, at 1:00 p.m. local time. Television coverage was provided by ESPN, with Marty Reid serving as the play-by-play commentator and Rusty Wallace and Scott Goodyear serving as race analysts. The race was reportedly attended by 78,000 people. Rain at the track had finally cleared up, though cloudy skies lowered the air temperatures to 57 °F (14 °C). As the green flag was waved by Bridgestone Corporation CEO Soshi Arakawa, Castroneves began driving away from the field. He gradually widened his lead to nearly two seconds over Dixon in the next twenty laps. However, Castroneves experienced slight troubles while attempting to put Simmons a lap down, which allowed Wheldon, who passed Dixon for second a few laps prior, to breeze by him and take the lead on lap 25. Two laps later, the first caution of the race was flown when Enge's car suffered a mechanical failure and swerved in front of Carpenter, causing the two drivers to collide and crash in turn three. Neither driver was injured. During the caution period, all of the leaders elected to drive into pit road, and Castroneves retook the lead over Wheldon. The green flag was waved again on lap 42, though it only took a handful of seconds for the second caution to be issued. Sharp, the 2003 winner of the event, spun out exiting turn four. P. J. Chesson was then hit from behind by Simmons, sending Chesson spinning hard into the inside wall. Simmons had also lost control of his car, spinning directly into the path of Sharp's car. The collision sent Simmons' car rolling down the front straightaway before landing on all four tires. All three drivers were unhurt.

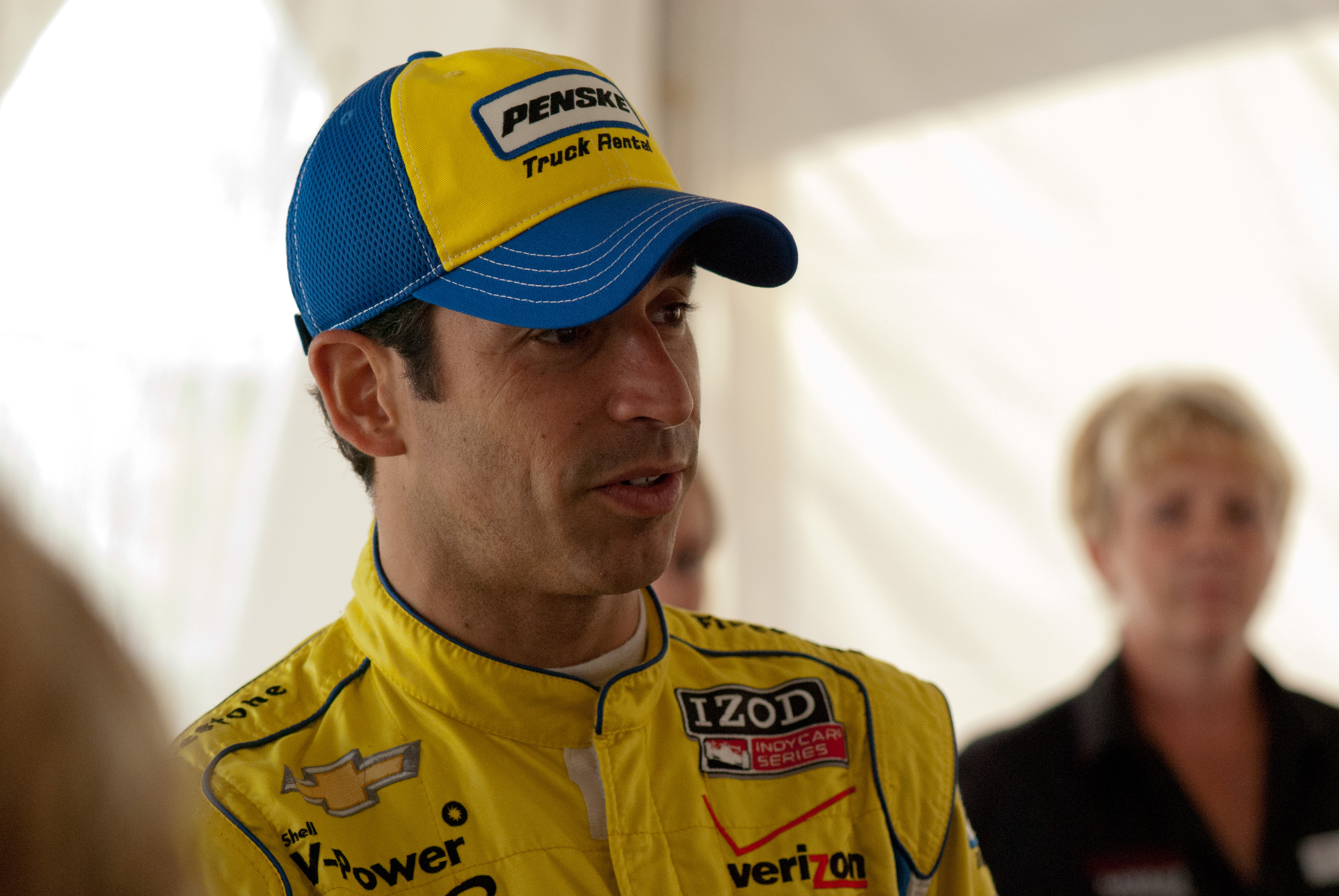
Hélio Castroneves (pictured in 2012) led all but 16 laps and won the race.

By lap 53, all debris had been cleared, and the green flag was waved once again. Throughout the next 40 laps, Castroneves gradually lengthened his gap from second-place driver Wheldon to 1.9153 seconds. On lap 93, Rahal Letterman Racing teammates Rice and Patrick were the first drivers to enter pit road under green-flag conditions, and several other drivers soon followed. Castroneves gave up the lead to Kanaan on lap 94 as he entered pit road for four tires and fuel. Kanaan, who led his first lap of the season, entered pit road a lap later, giving the lead to Dixon. After Dixon, who led two laps, Scheckter, who led three laps, and Vítor Meira, who led one lap, entered pit road, Castroneves cycled back around to pick up the race lead on lap 101, with Dixon overtaking Wheldon for second. On lap 126, Kanaan was forced to pit once again for a precautionary tire change, which placed him in 13th, two laps down. As several other drivers entered pit road for the second round of green-flag pit stops around lap 141, Dixon gained enough momentum on Castroneves and attempted to pass him, though Castroneves defended his position. He eventually pitted on the 145th lap. That same lap, Dario Franchitti also entered his pit stall and accidentally struck tire changer Steve Price. Price was later transported to Dokkyo University Hospital to evaluate a leg injury. Dixon, who led three laps after Castroneves' final pit stop, entered his pit stall on lap 148. However, Dixon's engine stalled as he tried to exit pit road, thus keeping him out of contention for the win.

Seven laps after Castroneves was shuffled back to the lead, the third and final caution of the race was thrown when Felipe Giaffone lost control of his car in the third turn after Hornish Jr. shoved him near the outside wall. Giaffone brushed the wall in turn four and spun on the front straightaway, slamming the wall twice more and breaking the right side of his suspension; Giaffone was uninjured. Under yellow-flag conditions, most drivers, excluding Castroneves, Wheldon, and Hornish Jr., pitted once more. The green flag was issued again on lap 167, and Castroneves continued his domanince over the field. Wheldon elected to conserve his fuel and tires, causing his gap behind Castroneves to grow to over six seconds in the final 33 laps. Castroneves, with no contest from the other drivers, drove to his ninth career IndyCar Series victory, leading a race-high 184 laps in the process. Wheldon finished 6.3851 seconds behind Castroneves in second, while Kanaan clawed his way up to finish a respectable third. Hornish Jr. and Rice took the fourth and fifth positions, and Bryan Herta, Matsuura, Patrick, Dixon, and Meira rounded out the top ten. Franchitti, Marco Andretti, Scheckter, and Buddy Lazier were the last of the classified finishers. There were three caution flags which slowed the race for 32 laps, and 10 lead changes amongst six different drivers.

=== Post-race ===
Castroneves performed his usual celebration of climbing the catch-fencing before driving to victory lane; he earned $176,100 in race winnings. After the race, Castroneves said: "These guys are unbelievable. We were fast from the very start this week, which is good because there wasn't a lot of practice time. But today was perfect, and the car was perfect, too. I said yesterday that I wanted to finish where we started, and I don't think it was ever in question. We were fast all day." Concerning his emotional state entering the Month of May, Castroneves said: "It's too early to get emotional, to be honest. It's only third race of the season. I've been in this team, the guys know me, I know them. Just a matter of finally everything gets going towards to our direction."

Runner-up finisher Wheldon humbly commented on his performance throughout the race: "It’s a reasonable result from a points standpoint. I just didn’t have enough for Hélio. At some points of the race I was very, very quick, and just tailed off at other points. All in all, it’s a great result. It would have been great to win three in a row. But it just wasn’t meant to be and we’ll move on to Indy." Kanaan, who finished third, talked about his unscheduled pit stop with less than 80 laps remaining: "I can't say it was a bad day finishing third, but it was a tough day. The team radioed that I might be losing air pressure in one of the rear tires and they asked how the car felt. I told them the car felt fine, but my head was beginning to get concerned, so we made the pit stop just to be safe. The Team 7-Eleven car was fast, but I don't know if we could have caught Helio, or not. We'll take our third here and maybe we can win the next one."

Regarding his two crashes throughout the weekend, Simmons said: "This is not any way anyone wants to start something. Two wrecked cars in one race weekend is something I have never done before. This is not what anyone on Rahal Letterman was looking for." Enge also commented on his early crash, stating: "I was running behind Felipe (Giaffone) and suddenly I got a call from my team to come in immediately, so I started to brake for the pit lane entrance on the backstretch. Suddenly, something broke on the front suspension. From that point, I was just a passenger." He also revealed his plans to participate in the Indianapolis 500: "We had been in touch with several teams over the winter about driving in the IRL again but nothing came together. I’m just happy for every opportunity to come back to the IRL because I love the IRL." Carpenter, who was also involved in Enge's crash, was disappointed with his result and lamented about his team's disastrous start to the season: "I am hating this for the Vision team. They have been busting their butts all year but we can’t get a break. We can’t seem to get the season started. Hopefully we can get things turned around for Indianapolis and have a good month. Right now, I can’t catch a break. I felt like I should have raced St. Pete but they wouldn’t let me. I come here and get knocked out before the first pit stop. Two cars destroyed in the two times I have been in them."

The finishing order of the race allowed Castroneves to gain 146 points and extend his Drivers' Championship lead over Wheldon, who earned 104 points, entering the Indianapolis 500. Hornish Jr. also earned 94 points and improved to third, while Dixon fell to fourth with 92 points. Kanaan, who obtained 89 points, placed fifth.

=== Race classification ===
Pos	No.	Driver	Team	Chassis	Laps	Time/Retired	Grid	Laps Led	Pts.
1	3	(Brazil) Hélio Castroneves	Team Penske	Dallara	200	01:59:01.3704	1	184	53^{1}
2	10	(United Kingdom) Dan Wheldon W	Chip Ganassi Racing	Dallara	200	+6.3851	3	5	40
3	11	(Brazil) Tony Kanaan	Andretti Green Racing	Dallara	200	+8.6163	5	1	35
4	6	(United States) Sam Hornish Jr.	Team Penske	Dallara	200	+9.0011	4	0	32
5	15	(United States) Buddy Rice	Rahal Letterman Racing	Panoz	200	+9.7491	18	0	30
6	7	(United States) Bryan Herta	Andretti Green Racing	Dallara	200	+13.8972	7	0	28
7	55	(Japan) Kosuke Matsuura	Fernández Racing	Dallara	200	+14.7633	6	0	26
8	16	(United States) Danica Patrick	Rahal Letterman Racing	Panoz	200	+15.4456	14	0	24
9	9	(New Zealand) Scott Dixon	Chip Ganassi Racing	Dallara	199	+1 Lap	2	5	22
10	4	(Brazil) Vítor Meira	Panther Racing	Dallara	199	+1 Lap	11	2	20
11	27	(United Kingdom) Dario Franchitti	Andretti Green Racing	Dallara	199	+1 Lap	10	0	19
12	26	(United States) Marco Andretti R	Andretti Green Racing	Dallara	199	+1 Lap	17	0	18
13	2	(South Africa) Tomas Scheckter	Vision Racing	Dallara	196	+4 Laps	12	3	17
14	5	(United States) Buddy Lazier	Dreyer & Reinbold Racing	Dallara	195	+5 Laps	15	0	16
15	14	(Brazil) Felipe Giaffone	A. J. Foyt Racing	Dallara	155	Accident	9	0	15
16	8	(United States) Scott Sharp W	Fernández Racing	Dallara	42	Accident	8	0	14
17	91	(United States) P. J. Chesson R	Hemelgarn Racing	Dallara	40	Accident	16	0	13
18	17	(United States) Jeff Simmons R	Rahal Letterman Racing	Panoz	40	Accident	20	0	12
19	51	(Czech Republic) Tomáš Enge	Cheever Racing	Dallara	25	Accident	13	0	12
20	20	(United States) Ed Carpenter	Vision Racing	Dallara	25	Accident	19	0	12
Fastest lap: (New Zealand) Scott Dixon (Chip Ganassi Racing) - 27.2804 (lap 171)
Official race results

Notes

- ^1 — Includes three bonus points for leading the most laps.

== Championship standings after the race ==
Drivers' Championship standings

+/-	Pos.	Driver	Points
Unchanged	1	(Brazil) Hélio Castroneves	146
1	2	(United Kingdom) Dan Wheldon	104 (–42)
1	3	(United States) Sam Hornish Jr.	94 (–52)
2	4	(New Zealand) Scott Dixon	92 (–54)
Unchanged	5	(Brazil) Tony Kanaan	89 (–57)

- Note: Only the top five positions are included.

Previous race: 2006 Honda Grand Prix of St. Petersburg	IndyCar Series; 2006 season	Next race: 2006 Indianapolis 500
Previous race: 2005 Indy Japan 300	Indy Japan 300	Next race: 2007 Indy Japan 300
