= 2006 Bombardier Learjet 500 =

IndyCar race held in Fort Worth, Texas

(United States) 2006 Bombardier Learjet 500
Race details
6th round of the 2006 IndyCar season
← Previous race	Next race →
- Layout of the Texas Motor Speedway circuit
- Date: June 10, 2006
- Official name: Bombardier Learjet 500
- Location: Texas Motor Speedway, Fort Worth, Texas
- Course: Permanent racing facility 1.500 mi / 2.400 km
- Distance: 200 laps 300 mi / 482.803 km

Pole position
- Driver: (United States) Sam Hornish Jr. (Team Penske)
- Time: 24.5197

Fastest lap
- Driver: (United Kingdom) Dan Wheldon (Chip Ganassi Racing)
- Time: 24.4535 (on lap 200 of 200)

Podium
- First: (Brazil) Hélio Castroneves (Team Penske)
- Second: (New Zealand) Scott Dixon (Chip Ganassi Racing)
- Third: (United Kingdom) Dan Wheldon (Chip Ganassi Racing)

Chronology
Previous	Next
2005	2007

The 2006 Bombardier Learjet 500 was an IndyCar Series motor race held on June 10, 2006, in Fort Worth, Texas, at Texas Motor Speedway. It was the sixth round of the 2006 IndyCar Series and the seventeenth running of the event. Marlboro Team Penske driver Hélio Castroneves won the 200-lap race. Scott Dixon, driving for Target Chip Ganassi Racing, finished second, and Dixon's teammate Dan Wheldon finished third.

Sam Hornish Jr., who had won the Indianapolis 500 two weeks prior, won the pole position with the fastest overall time of the qualifying session. He led the first lap before being quickly passed by Wheldon, who led 171 of the next 184 laps and only gave up the lead during green-flag pit stops. However, during Wheldon's final pit stop on lap 185, one of his crewmen dropped a lug nut, dropping him back to third in the running order when he rejoined the track. Race leader Hornish Jr. also stalled his engine during his last pit stop on lap 193, giving Castroneves the opportunity to steal the victory which he successfully took. With only two cautions and no crashes from any driver, race winner Castroneves accumulated an average speed of 185.710 mph (298.871 km/h), making this the third-fastest race in IndyCar history (at the time).

Castroneves' win was his third of the season and the tenth of his IndyCar career. As a result, he extended his lead in the Drivers' Championship to 22 points over Dixon. Wheldon's dominant performance helped him advance to third over Hornish Jr., while Kanaan placed fifth with eight races remaining in the season.

== Background ==
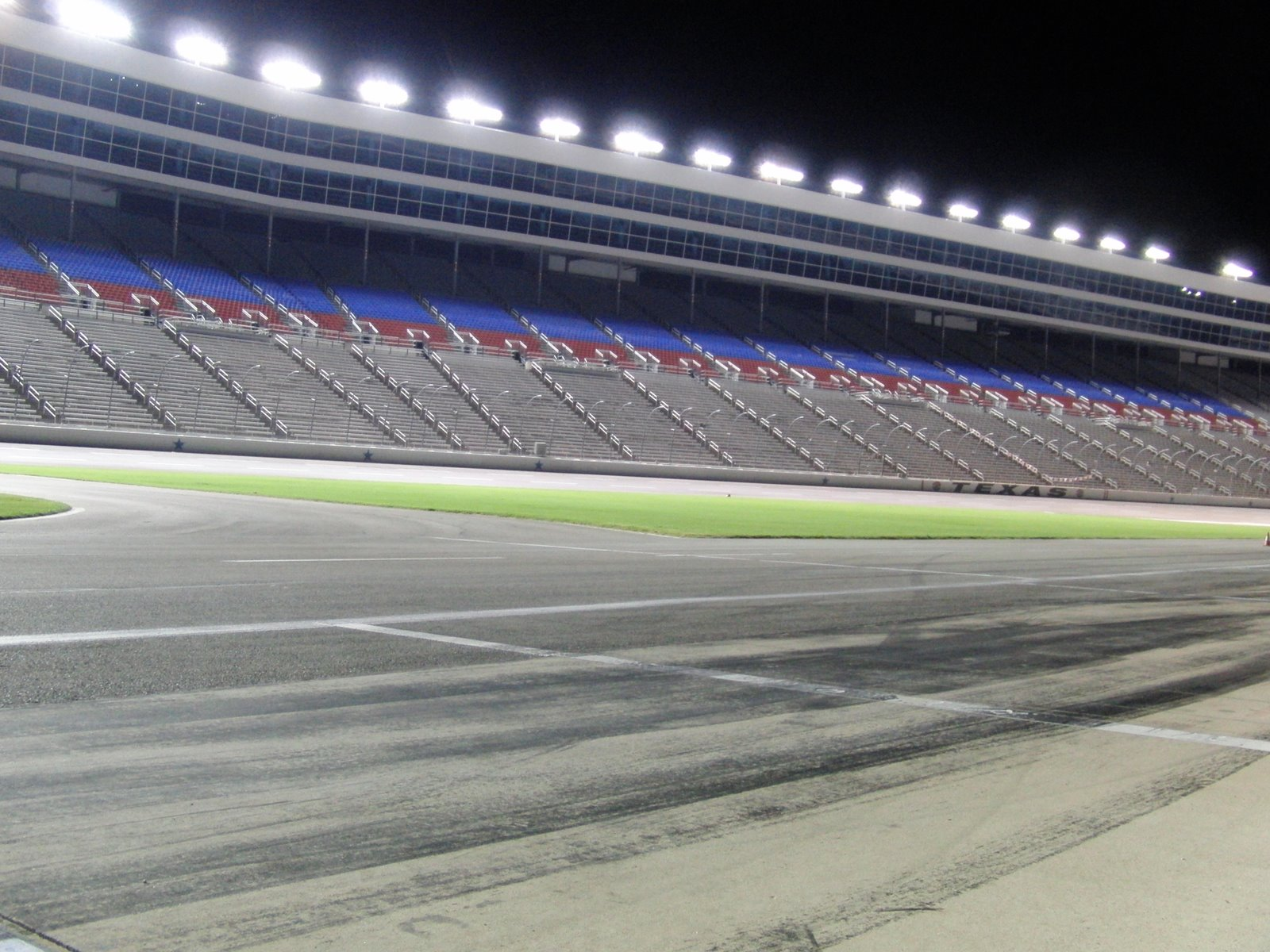
Texas Motor Speedway (pictured in 2009), where the race was held.

The Bombardier Learjet 500 was confirmed to be included in IndyCar's 2006 schedule in September 2005. It was the 6th of 14 scheduled races for 2006 and the seventeenth iteration of the event. It was held on Saturday, June 10, 2006, in Fort Worth, Texas, United States, at Texas Motor Speedway, a 1.5 mi (2.4 km) asphalt oval-shaped circuit with four turns, and was to be contested over 200 laps and 300 miles (480 km). Tomas Scheckter was the defending race winner. Heading into the event, Marlboro Team Penske driver Hélio Castroneves held the lead in the Drivers' Championship with 182 points, twelve more than Scott Dixon, who had won the previous race at Watkins Glen. Sam Hornish Jr. sat in third with 162 points, while Dan Wheldon and Tony Kanaan vacated the fourth and fifth positions with 157 and 138 points, respectively.

In 2006, Texas Motor Speedway was celebrating its tenth season of competition. The track had become a staple on the IndyCar schedule for its close-quarters racing and photo finishes. One of the most enthusiastic drivers entering the event was Scheckter, who, in addition to his 2005 win, had also earned three pole positions at the track. Scheckter lauded the racing style and atmosphere at the track, favoring it over Formula One and NASCAR races. Two-time Texas winner Hornish Jr. was glad to leave the inclement weather at Watkins Glen behind, and commented on how drivers became accustomed to using the draft at Texas: "It's a fine line. You have to get out there and experience to know how good your car works behind somebody else, figure out where you need to be and how close you should be to them." Teammate Castroneves added: "The main factor you have to look at are how your car is handling by itself. The second is how your car handles behind another car because sometimes it will push. Sometimes, if you have too much front wing, it will be loose. If you get out of a car too fast, that's when you get turbulence."

After Michael Andretti and Al Unser Jr. came out of retirement to participate in the Indianapolis 500, track president Eddie Gossage proposed a $100,000 sponsorship fee to them if they both competed in the race at Texas; the fee would be split amongst their two teams. However, Andretti and Unser Jr. declined the proposition, citing a lack of preparation time and sponsorship as the main reasons.

== Practice and qualifying ==
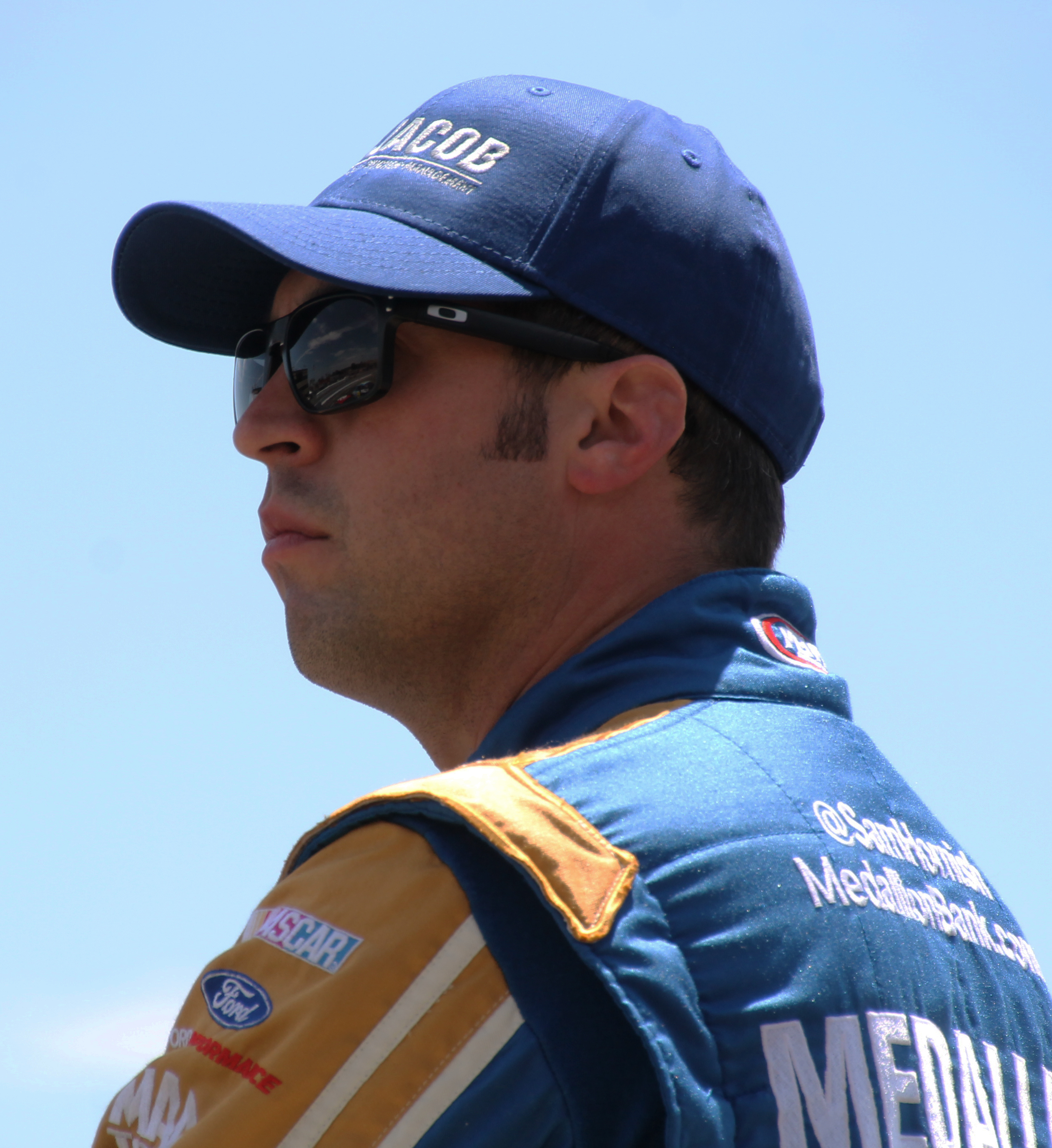
Sam Hornish Jr. (pictured in 2015) won his ninth career pole position.

Four practice sessions preceded the race on Saturday; the first two were held on Thursday, and the last two were held on Friday. The first session lasted for 90 minutes, the next two sessions lasted for 60 minutes, and the final session lasted for 30 minutes. The first three sessions would be split in half among two groups of drivers. Rahal Letterman Racing drivers Buddy Rice, Danica Patrick, and Jeff Simmons were all given ten extra minutes of practice in order for them to adapt to their new Dallara chassis. Dixon was fastest in the first practice session with a time of 24.5455 seconds, ahead of Castroneves, Wheldon, Hornish Jr., and Scheckter. Dixon later topped his fastest time during the second practice session with a lap at 24.3782 seconds, besting Wheldon, Hornish Jr., Kosuke Matsuura, and Marco Andretti.

During qualifications, which was held on Thursday night, each driver was required to complete two laps in their qualifying attempt; the best of the two laps would determine their starting position. Hornish Jr. won the ninth pole position of his IndyCar career with a time of 24.5197 seconds and a speed of 213.624 mph (343.795 km/h). He was joined on the front row by Wheldon, whose quickest lap was only 0.0041 seconds slower than Hornish Jr. Castroneves qualified third, Dixon took fourth, and Scheckter started fifth. Kanaan, Scott Sharp, Dario Franchitti, Andretti, and Matsuura rounded out the top ten, and Bryan Herta, Ed Carpenter, Vítor Meira, Rice, Patrick, Simmons, Eddie Cheever, Buddy Lazier, and Felipe Giaffone completed the starting grid for Saturday's race. Franchitti only completed one qualifying lap after his team pulled his car out of line to repair fuel pressure issues. Giaffone was unable to qualify because of a malfunctioning throttle position sensor. After qualifying, Hornish Jr. said: "Everything is going really good for the Marlboro Team Penske car. Our run was pretty good, even though we slowed down from where we thought we'd be. The car ran really good earlier today when we were running in practice."

On Friday afternoon, Dixon lapped the fastest time of the third practice session at 24.4744 seconds, ahead of Castroneves, Sharp, Hornish Jr., and Wheldon. Later that evening, Hornish Jr. would surpass Dixon's time and set the fastest lap of the final practice session at 24.4100 seconds, exceeding ahead of Castroneves, Wheldon, Dixon, and Sharp.

=== Qualifying classification ===
Pos	No.	Driver	Team	Lap 1	Lap 2	Final grid
1	6	(United States) Sam Hornish Jr.	Marlboro Team Penske	**24.5197**	24.5349	1
2	10	(United Kingdom) Dan Wheldon	Target Chip Ganassi Racing	**24.5238**	24.5366	2
3	3	(Brazil) Hélio Castroneves	Marlboro Team Penske	**24.5706**	24.5998	3
4	9	(New Zealand) Scott Dixon	Target Chip Ganassi Racing	24.7102	**24.5998**	4
5	2	(South Africa) Tomas Scheckter	Vision Racing	24.6421	**24.6120**	5
6	11	(Brazil) Tony Kanaan	Andretti Green Racing	**24.6711**	24.7309	6
7	8	(United States) Scott Sharp	Delphi Fernández Racing	**24.6794**	24.7152	7
8	27	(United Kingdom) Dario Franchitti	Andretti Green Racing	**24.7154**	—	8
9	26	(United States) Marco Andretti	Andretti Green Racing	24.7496	**24.7165**	9
10	55	(Japan) Kosuke Matsuura	Super Aguri Fernández Racing	**24.7607**	24.7768	10
11	7	(United States) Bryan Herta	Andretti Green Racing	**24.7622**	24.7875	18^{1}
12	20	(United States) Ed Carpenter	Vision Racing	**24.7783**	24.7785	11
13	4	(Brazil) Vítor Meira	Panther Racing	**24.7913**	24.8009	12
14	15	(United States) Buddy Rice	Rahal Letterman Racing	24.8071	**24.8055**	13
15	16	(United States) Danica Patrick	Rahal Letterman Racing	**24.8269**	24.8487	14
16	17	(United States) Jeff Simmons	Rahal Letterman Racing	**24.8901**	24.8902	15
17	51	(United States) Eddie Cheever	Cheever Racing	**25.0127**	25.0345	16
18	5	(United States) Buddy Lazier	Dreyer & Reinbold Racing	**25.0440**	25.0679	17
19	14	(Brazil) Felipe Giaffone	A. J. Foyt Racing	—	—	19

Notes

- **Bold text** indicates fastest time set in session.
- **^1** — Bryan Herta started in 18th because of an engine change the night prior to the race. Herta started ahead of Felipe Giaffone because he made a qualifying attempt, unlike Giaffone.

== Race ==
The race began on Saturday, June 10, at 8:15 PM Central Daylight Time (UTC−05:00), and was broadcast live on ESPN in the United States. Commentary was provided by Marty Reid, while Scott Goodyear and Rusty Wallace took the roles of race analysts. Weather conditions at the speedway were muggy and humid, with air temperatures and track temperatures topping out at 94 °F (34 °C). An estimated 91,000 people were in attendance for the event. Actor Patrick Dempsey of the drama series Grey's Anatomy commanded the drivers to start their engines, and three-time Indianapolis 500 winner Johnny Rutherford drove the pace car. Hornish Jr. maintained his pole position advantage on the first lap, but he was quickly overtaken by Wheldon the next lap. From there, Wheldon held onto the lead for the next 55 laps, gradually gaining a 0.9-second gap over Hornish Jr. by the 50th lap. Meanwhile, Matsuura clawed his way up to the fourth position within the first 30 laps, while Giaffone improved to 12th.

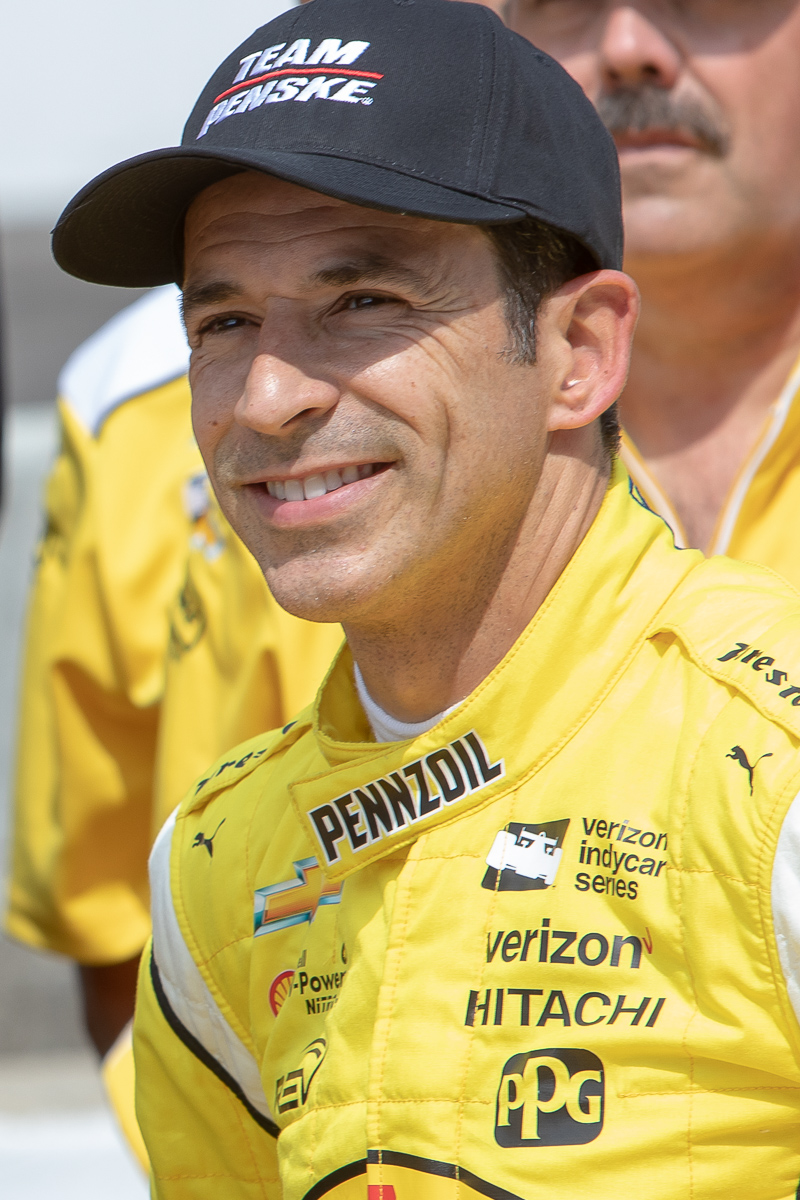
Hélio Castroneves (pictured in 2018) led the final 8 laps and won the race.

With tires beginning to wane, Carpenter and Cheever drove into pit road and began the first round of green-flag pit stops on lap 53. Many drivers would soon follow in the next four laps, including Wheldon, who gave up the lead to Hornish Jr. on the 57th lap. A lap later, the first caution flag of the race was warranted when Lazier's car slowed on the apron of the track; he had reportedly suffered either an electrical or drive shaft failure and retired from the race. Hornish Jr. pitted for four tires and fuel on the 61st lap, yielding the lead back to Wheldon and sending him back to second. Only two laps after the restart on lap 69, the second caution flag was issued for Rice, whose car trailed a cloud of smoke from a faulty engine. He became the second retiree of the race. During this caution period, several drivers towards the rear of the field took the opportunity to enter pit road for fuel. Wheldon continued his sheer dominance over the other drivers following the lap 79 restart, leading 66 consecutive laps; however, Hornish Jr. was consistently within reach of Wheldon, as the gap between the two drivers by lap 115 was only 0.2 seconds.

Carpenter, anticipating another caution period, commenced the second cycle of green-flag pit stops on the 121st lap. Wheldon made a pit stop on lap 128 and conceded the lead to Hornish Jr. before he entered pit road on lap 131. From there, Sharp inherited the lead and remained on the track for five laps before driving into pit road on the 136th lap, handing the first position back to Wheldon. Castroneves' wing adjustment, coupled with a fast out lap, helped him claim the second position over teammate Hornish Jr. by the time pit stop cycles had ended. By utilizing the draft from several backmarkers, Wheldon maintained his lead and extended his gap over Castroneves to over half a second on lap 160, by which point Dixon had also passed Hornish Jr. for third. Castroneves inched evermore closer to Wheldon, but was still unable to get by him. Once again, Carpenter was the first driver to reenter pit road and kick off the final sequence of green-flag pit stops on lap 176, though most other drivers, including Castroneves, Dixon, and Kanaan, would not make pit stops until lap 183.

Wheldon drove into pit road on lap 185 for an expectedly routine pit stop, giving the lead to Hornish Jr. in the process, but his right-rear tire changer dropped a lug nut, thus lengthening his pit stop by two seconds over Castroneves' pit stop. He rejoined the track in third behind Castroneves and Dixon. Leader Hornish Jr. suffered misfortunes of his own when he stalled his engine while exiting his pit stall on the 193rd lap, dropping him to sixth and ending his hopes of winning the race. Castroneves concurrently capitalized on Wheldon and Hornish Jr.'s troubles and took the lead. Dixon managed to diminish Castroneves' 1.2-second lead in the final eight laps, but was ultimately unable to overtake Castroneves, who secured his third victory of the season and the tenth of his IndyCar career by 0.2402 seconds over Dixon. Wheldon, who led a race-high 171 laps, finished third; on the final lap, he had recorded the fastest lap of the race at 24.4535 seconds. Hornish Jr. clawed up to fourth, and Sharp edged out Meira for the fifth position. Kanaan, Matsuura, Carpenter, and Scheckter took positions seventh through tenth, and Herta, Patrick, Franchitti, Andretti, Simmons, Giaffone, and Cheever were the last of the classified finishers.

=== Post-race ===
Castroneves performed his usual celebratory practice of climbing the front stretch catch fence before appearing in victory lane; he earned $115,800 in race winnings. During the post-race press conference, Castroneves attributed his win to his pit crew, saying: "We won the pit stop contest. This is not an individual sport; it takes the whole team." He added: "What a team. I couldn't ask for anything better. What an incredible race. I couldn't ask for anything better.” Castroneves' average speed of 185.710 mph (298.871 km/h) made this the third-fastest race in IndyCar history (at the time). Second-place finisher Dixon thanked Scheckter for helping him reel in Castroneves and called the race "good for our team and good for points." Wheldon, on the other hand, was dejected with the result and claimed he and his team "gifted another win to Penske" because of their miscue on the final pit stop. He later added: "I wanted to lead early on and dominate the race because that's what we need to do to overcome the points deficit. And we did that most of the day, and screwed up at the end.''

Hornish Jr., who finished fourth, reflected on his fuel-saving strategy and simply commented: "We win as a team and we lose as a team. That's all there is to it." Fifth-place finisher Sharp was pleased with his race and hoped that it would mark a positive shift in his team's performance. Meira explained that his car was perfectly tuned, but cooler track temperatures coupled with a waning fuel tank caused him to lose two positions on the last lap en route to a sixth-place finish. Kanaan, seventh-place finisher, kept his post-race remarks short and said that his car was good, but not good enough to compete for the win. Matsuura admitted fault for the setbacks he endured throughout the race, but was happy with where he finished and looked forward to the next race at Richmond Raceway. Carpenter stated that a lack of caution periods hindered him from competing with the lead pack; otherwise, he praised his car and his pit crew. Rice, whose retirement on lap 70 marked his fourth straight DNF result at Texas, jokingly desired to talk to track president Gossage about his poor luck at the track.

The final result meant that Castroneves would maintain his Drivers' Championship lead with 232 points, ahead of Dixon with 210 points. Wheldon's third-place finish helped him improve to third in the championship with 195 points, while Hornish Jr. fell to fourth, one point behind Wheldon. Kanaan remained in fifth, thirty points behind Hornish Jr.

=== Race classification ===
Pos	No.	Driver	Team	Laps	Time/Retired	Grid	Laps Led	Pts.
1	3	(Brazil) Hélio Castroneves	Marlboro Team Penske	200	01:34:01.0482	3	8	50
2	9	(New Zealand) Scott Dixon	Target Chip Ganassi Racing	200	+0.2402	4	0	40
3	10	(United Kingdom) Dan Wheldon	Target Chip Ganassi Racing	200	+0.2981	2	171	38^{2}
4	6	(United States) Sam Hornish Jr.	Marlboro Team Penske	200	+14.5389	1	16	32
5	8	(United States) Scott Sharp	Delphi Fernández Racing	200	+14.5895	7	5	30
6	4	(Brazil) Vítor Meira	Panther Racing	200	+15.9294	12	0	28
7	11	(Brazil) Tony Kanaan	Andretti Green Racing	200	+16.1398	6	0	26
8	55	(Japan) Kosuke Matsuura	Super Aguri Fernández Racing	200	+22.3327	10	0	24
9	20	(United States) Ed Carpenter	Vision Racing	200	+22.9791	11	0	22
10	2	(South Africa) Tomas Scheckter	Vision Racing	199	+1 Lap	5	0	20
11	7	(United States) Bryan Herta	Andretti Green Racing	199	+1 Lap	18	0	19
12	16	(United States) Danica Patrick	Rahal Letterman Racing	199	+1 Lap	14	0	18
13	27	(United Kingdom) Dario Franchitti	Andretti Green Racing	199	+1 Lap	8	0	17
14	26	(United States) Marco Andretti	Andretti Green Racing	199	+1 Lap	9	0	16
15	17	(United States) Jeff Simmons	Rahal Letterman Racing	198	+2 Laps	15	0	15
16	14	(Brazil) Felipe Giaffone	A. J. Foyt Racing	197	+3 Laps	19	0	14
17	51	(United States) Eddie Cheever	Cheever Racing	197	+3 Laps	16	0	13
18	15	(United States) Buddy Rice	Rahal Letterman Racing	70	Engine	13	0	12
19	5	(United States) Buddy Lazier	Dreyer & Reinbold Racing	56	Fuel Pump	17	0	12

Notes

- ^2 — Includes three bonus points for leading the most laps.

== Championship standings after the race ==
Drivers' Championship standings

	Pos.	Driver	Points
Unchanged	1	(Brazil) Hélio Castroneves	232
Unchanged	2	(New Zealand) Scott Dixon	210 (–22)
1	3	(United Kingdom) Dan Wheldon	195 (–37)
1	4	(United States) Sam Hornish Jr.	194 (–38)
Unchanged	5	(Brazil) Tony Kanaan	164 (–68)

- Note: Only the top five positions are included.

Previous race: 2006 Watkins Glen Indy Grand Prix	IndyCar Series; 2006 season	Next race: 2006 SunTrust Indy Challenge
Previous race: 2005 Bombardier Learjet 500	Bombardier Learjet 500	Next race: 2007 Bombardier Learjet 550
