= 2005 Indianapolis 500 =

American motor race

89th Indianapolis 500

Indianapolis Motor Speedway

Indianapolis 500
- Sanctioning body: Indy Racing League
- Season: 2005 IndyCar season
- Date: May 29, 2005
- Winner: (United Kingdom) Dan Wheldon
- Winning team: Andretti-Green Racing
- Winning Chief Mechanic: Mike Horvath
- Time of race: 3:10:21.0769
- Average speed: 157.603 mph (253.637 km/h)
- Pole position: (Brazil) Tony Kanaan
- Pole speed: 227.566 mph (366.232 km/h)
- Fastest qualifier: (Sweden) Kenny Bräck 227.598 mph (366.283 km/h)
- Rookie of the Year: (United States) Danica Patrick
- Most laps led: (United States) Sam Hornish Jr. (77)

Pre-race ceremonies
- National anthem: Members of United States Armed Forces
- "Back Home Again in Indiana": Jim Nabors
- Starting command: Mari Hulman George
- Pace car: Chevrolet Corvette
- Pace car driver: Colin Powell
- Starter: Bryan Howard
- Honorary starter: Reggie Miller
- Estimated attendance: 250,000 (estimated)

Television in the United States
- Network: ABC
- Announcers: Todd Harris, Scott Goodyear
- Nielsen ratings: 6.5 (9.7 million viewers) / 18

Chronology
| Previous | Next |
|---|---|
| 2004 | 2006 |

The 89th Indianapolis 500 was held at the Indianapolis Motor Speedway in Speedway, Indiana on Sunday, May 29, 2005. It was the premier event of the 2005 IndyCar Series season and the tenth Indy 500 sanctioned by the Indy Racing League. Dan Wheldon won the race, his first of two Indy victories (2005 and 2011). Wheldon became the first British-born winner since Graham Hill in 1966. It was the second consecutive Indy victory for Honda, and the first victory for the Dallara chassis since 2002. It was also the long-awaited first Indianapolis 500 victory for car owner Michael Andretti of Andretti-Green Racing. After many years of failing to win the race as a driver (contributing to the perception of the so-called Andretti Curse), Andretti finally achieved victory at Indianapolis as an owner.

Rookie Danica Patrick, who qualified and finished 4th, became the first female driver in Indy history to lead laps during the race. She led three times for a total of 19 laps and won the Rookie of the Year award. Considerable media hype and attention were focused on the race and on Patrick in particular during the month, giving birth to the term "Danica Mania". Her 4th place starting position broke the record set by Lyn St. James (6th in 1994) and her 4th-place finishing position broke the record set by Janet Guthrie (9th in 1978).

The increased attention going into the race helped register a 6.5 Nielsen rating, the highest since 1996. Also making headlines during the month of May was the return of 1999 winner Kenny Bräck. After suffering a violent crash in Texas in October 2003, Bräck sat out the 2004 season, recovering from serious injuries. In what would be his final IndyCar race, he drove in substitution for Buddy Rice. Rice, the 2004 winner suffered a concussion in a practice crash on May 11, and was forced to sit out the event. Bräck was the overall fastest qualifier during time trials but dropped out of the race near the halfway point due to mechanical problems.

== Background ==
Over the offseason, the Indianapolis Motor Speedway was milled and repaved in asphalt. Selective diamond grinding was done in an effort to smooth out bumps in the turns. On April 5, 2005, a private test session saw four teams (AGR, Ganassi, Rahal, and Panther) test for Firestone. The session was canceled, however, when the inconsistent pavement in the turns created an unsuitable dual level of grip in the corners. A week later, the entire track was diamond ground to cure the problem.

The schedule for the Month of May was slightly retooled for 2005. The annual rookie orientation program was moved to opening day, as well as the 2nd day of official activity. Previously, in most cases, rookie orientation was held prior to the traditional "opening day" of practice, often in April. Veteran practice would commence on Tuesday, the 3rd day overall.

Carb Day, the traditional last day of practice before the race, was moved from its familiar Thursday slot to Friday of the race weekend. After 4 years of having 3 days of time trials scheduled (2001–2004), time trials reverted to 4 days, and a new format (dubbed "11/11/11") was introduced.

After they were first allowed in 2004, single-point refueling rigs were made mandatory for 2005.

After several decades of the race traditionally starting at 11:00 a.m. local time (EST), the start time was moved to 12:00 p.m. EST (1:00 p.m. EDT).

=== Team and driver changes ===
Among the numerous team/driver changes for 2005 included Rahal Letterman Racing. Defending Indy 500 winner Buddy Rice returned, and was joined by rookie Danica Patrick. Newman/Haas Racing returned to the Indy 500, entering Sébastien Bourdais and Bruno Junqueira.

Two-time winner Al Unser Jr. took a brief retirement from driving in 2005 and did not enter. With him along with others such as Michael Andretti and Arie Luyendyk on the sidelines, no participants from the 1980s would qualify for the field, the first time ever.

== Race schedule ==
Race schedule – May 2005
| Sun | Mon | Tue | Wed | Thu | Fri | Sat |
|---|---|---|---|---|---|---|
| 1 | 2 | 3 | 4 | 5 | 6 | 7 Mini-Marathon |
| 8 ROP | 9 ROP | 10; Practice | 11; Practice | 12; Practice | 13; Practice | 14; Time Trials |
| 15; Time Trials | 16 | 17 | 18; Practice | 19; Practice | 20; Practice | 21; Time Trials |
| 22; Bump Day | 23 | 24 | 25 | 26 | 27; Carb Day | 28; Parade |
| 29; Indy 500 | 30; Memorial Day | 31 | | | | |

| Color | Notes |
|---|---|
| Green | Practice |
| Dark Blue | Time trials |
| Silver | Race day |
| Red | Rained out* |
| Blank | No track activity |

* Includes days where track activity
was significantly limited due to rain

ROP – denotes Rookie Orientation Program

== Practice (week 1) ==
=== Sunday May 8 ===
Opening day of practice focused on rookie orientation. The coveted 1st driver on the track was Danica Patrick. Among the top drivers of the day were Patrick at 221.463 mph (356.410 km/h), Ryan Briscoe, and Patrick Carpentier. 7 out of the 9 drivers participating completed their required rookie test.

=== Monday May 9 ===
The 2nd day of rookie orientation saw Danica Patrick again set the pace. She set the fastest lap of the month thus far at 222.741 mph (358.467 km/h). Sébastien Bourdais completed his rookie test, while Jeff Ward completed a refresher test.

=== Tuesday May 10 ===
The 1st full day of veteran practice saw heavy activity. Dan Wheldon led the speed chart at 226.808 mph (365.012 km/h), and no incidents were reported.

=== Wednesday May 11 ===
Defending Indy 500 winner Buddy Rice suffered a significant crash at 12:16 p.m. The car spun in Turn 2 and made heavy contact to the rear of the car. Kosuke Matsuura spun to avoid the crash, but received minimal damage. Rice was transported to Methodist Hospital with a concussion.

Rain ended the day about a half hour early, with Tony Kanaan fastest of the day, and fastest of the month thus far, at 227.453 mph (366.050 km/h).

=== Thursday May 12 ===
Darren Manning and Paul Dana both suffered single-car crashes during the session, but neither were seriously injured. Tony Kanaan led the pace early over 227 mph (365 km/h), but late in the day, Danica Patrick upped the speed to 227.633 mph (366.340 km/h). It marked the fastest lap thus far during the month, and the 1st time a female driver had led the speed chart on a full day of practice (without a rain delay) since 1977.

=== Friday May 13 ===
"Fast Friday" practice saw cloudy skies, and warm temperatures. Paul Dana wrecked his backup car, crashing for the 2nd day in a row. Exiting Turn 2, Dana spun and hit the outside wall, and slid down the back stretch. Sam Hornish Jr. hit a piece of debris from the wreck on the back stretch, and did a full flip. The car came down upright, but continued to spin and came to a rest overturned. Hornish was uninjured, but Dana was taken to the hospital for further evaluation.

Tomas Scheckter turned the fastest lap thus far around 1 p.m., at 227.804 mph (366.615 km/h). Rain began to fall shortly after 2 p.m., and closed the track for the day.

== Time trials (weekend 1) ==
=== Saturday May 14 ===
Rain fell overnight and into the morning, preventing any track activity. A new qualifying format was put into place for 2005, providing that only the top 11 cars would secure positions on Pole Day, and bumping would then occur. Track officials decided to cancel activities for the day at 12:15 p.m., and postpone Pole Qualifying until Sunday.

Shortly after the official postponement, the rain stopped and blue skies emerged. Some complained that qualifying could have been held after all, but head official Brian Barnhart still felt there would not be sufficient time to finish the qualifying order.

=== Sunday May 15 (Pole Day) ===
Cool temperatures in the mid-50s were observed for morning practice. Danica Patrick set the fastest lap of the entire month during the morning session at 229.880 mph (369.956 km/h). The lap made her a favorite for the front row. Dario Franchitti and Tony Kanaan were close behind on the speed chart.

Due to the rainout on Saturday, 22 positions were to be filled on Sunday. After the field filled to 22 cars, bumping would begin.

At noon, Scott Sharp was the 1st car to make a qualifying attempt. He placed himself in the field with a speed of 227.126 mph (365.524 km/h). Moments later, Tony Kanaan put himself on the provisional pole position with a speed of 227.566 mph (366.232 km/h).

At 12:45 p.m. Eastern time, Danica Patrick took to the track. On her 1st lap, midway through Turn 1, the back end of the car wiggled a bit, and slowed her exit from the turn. The 1st lap was a disappointing 224.920 mph (361.974 km/h). The 2nd lap, however, increased to 227.638 mph (366.348 km/h). Her 4th and final lap was run at 227.860 mph (366.705 km/h), the fastest single lap of the day. The final 4-lap average of 227.004 mph (365.328 km/h) put her in the 4th starting position. Many feel that if not for the mistake on the 1st lap, her speed would have been sufficient to secure the pole position.

Later in the day, Sam Hornish Jr. bumped his way onto the front row. Hélio Castroneves withdrew his earlier speed, but ended up losing a position when he re-qualified. The field filled to 22 cars, and the day ended as Jaques Lazier was "bumped".

== Practice (week 2) ==
=== Wednesday May 18 ===
Rahal Letterman Racing named Kenny Bräck as the replacement for injured Buddy Rice. Brack was the 1999 winner, but sat out the 2004 season recovering from a massive crash in October 2003 at Texas.

Nearly 2,500 laps were run during the afternoon, with Dan Wheldon fastest at 227.320 mph (365.836 km/h). The fastest non-qualified car was Kenny Bräck, already up to 225.774 mph (363.348 km/h).

=== Thursday May 19 ===
Rain washed out all practice for the day.

=== Friday May 20 ===
Another busy day of practice saw 2,228 laps completed incident-free. Dan Wheldon remained on top of the speech chart at 226.399 mph (364.354 km/h), until Tony Kanaan, at 226.490 mph (364.500 km/h), bumped him off in the final hour.

Arie Luyendyk Jr., attempting to complete his rookie test, suffered gearbox trouble, then later blew an engine.

== Time trials (weekend 2) ==
=== Saturday May 21 ===
The 3rd day of time trials saw the field fill to 32 cars. In the 1st hour, Ryan Briscoe, Marty Roth and Kenny Bräck completed runs. Bräck qualified at 227.598 mph (366.283 km/h), the fastest qualifier in the field. Though he qualified faster than polesitter Tony Kanaan, as a 3rd day qualifier, Bräck would be required to start 23rd.

After blowing an engine earlier, A. J. Foyt IV put a car in the field, and the field finished the day with 1 grid position open.

=== Sunday May 22 (Bump day) ===
With 1 position open, very few teams in the garage area were prepared to make a qualifying attempt. Most teams used the morning and afternoon sessions for practice. Arie Luyendyk Jr. was the only entry going into the day confirming an intent to qualify.

At 3:10 p.m., Luyendyk Jr. completed a run at 215.039 mph (346.072 km/h), and filled the field to 33 cars. Luyendyk Jr. was the slowest car in the field, and on the bubble. However, it appeared that Luyendyk would be safe, with no other teams preparing to qualify.

Shortly after the run, A. J. Foyt Racing announced that they had signed veteran Felipe Giaffone, and he would attempt to qualify. Giaffone had been shopping with his wife at Babies "Я" Us when he got a telephone call to run over to the Speedway. Within 2 hours of being at the store, Giaffone was suited up and ready to drive. In less than 45 minutes, he was up to speed and ready to qualify.

At 5:36 p.m., with less than 25 minutes left in the day, Giaffone took to the track and easily bumped Luyendyk Jr. from the field. Luyendyk's team quickly scrambled his car to go out 1 final time. With 1 minute remaining before the 6 o'clock gun, Luyendyk entered the track. His speed was slow, and he fell more than 7 mph (11 km/h) shy of bumping his way into the field.

== Starting grid ==
| Row | Inside | | Middle | | Outside | |
|---|---|---|---|---|---|---|
| 1 | 11 | (Brazil) Tony Kanaan | 6 | (United States) Sam Hornish Jr. | 8 | (United States) Scott Sharp |
| 2 | 16 | (United States) Danica Patrick R | 3 | (Brazil) Hélio Castroneves W | 27 | (United Kingdom) Dario Franchitti |
| 3 | 17 | (Brazil) Vítor Meira | 55 | (Japan) Kosuke Matsuura | 95 | (United States) Buddy Lazier W |
| 4 | 2 | (Czech Republic) Tomáš Enge R | 4 | (South Africa) Tomas Scheckter | 36 | (Brazil) Bruno Junqueira |
| 5 | 9 | (New Zealand) Scott Dixon | 5 | (Mexico) Adrián Fernández | 37 | (France) Sébastien Bourdais R |
| 6 | 26 | (United Kingdom) Dan Wheldon | 24 | (United States) Roger Yasukawa | 7 | (United States) Bryan Herta |
| 7 | 10 | (United Kingdom) Darren Manning | 70 | (United States) Richie Hearn | 44 | (United States) Jeff Bucknum R |
| 8 | 51 | (United States) Alex Barron | 15 | (Sweden) Kenny Bräck W | 33 | (Australia) Ryan Briscoe R |
| 9 | 83 | (Canada) Patrick Carpentier R | 20 | (United States) Ed Carpenter | 21 | (United States) Jaques Lazier |
| 10 | 14 | (United States) A. J. Foyt IV | 25 | (Canada) Marty Roth | 41 | (United States) Larry Foyt |
| 11 | 22 | (United States) Jeff Ward | 91 | (United States) Jimmy Kite | 48 | (Brazil) Felipe Giaffone |
Official report

W = former Indianapolis 500 winner; R = Indianapolis 500 rookie

=== Alternate ===
- First alternate: (Netherlands) Arie Luyendyk Jr. R (#98) – bumped

=== Failed to qualify ===
- (United States) Paul Dana R (#91) – injured during a practice crash; replaced by Jimmy Kite
- (United States) Buddy Rice W (#15) – injured during a practice crash; replaced by Kenny Bräck
- (United States) Scott Mayer R (#48) – failed to complete rookie orientation; replaced by Felipe Giaffone

== Carb Day ==
For the first time in modern scheduling, Carb Day was moved to the Friday before the race (May 27). It was previously held on a Thursday. The final practice session was also trimmed back to 1 hour.

All 33 qualified cars took to the track. 9 minutes into the session, Buddy Lazier wrecked coming out of Turn 4, sliding along the outside wall down the front stretch. Lazier was not seriously injured, but the car would have to be repaired before Sunday.

Danica Patrick led the speed chart at 225.597 mph (363.063 km/h), and no other serious issues were reported.

=== Pit Stop Challenge ===
The 29th annual Checkers and Rally's Pit Stop Challenge was held Friday May 27. Twelve teams competed in a single-elimination bracket. Eleven participants were named to the event. On May 18, a last-chance qualifying session was held, and Dario Franchitti advanced to fill the final spot. The bracket was determined by a blind draw.

Four teams received byes for the first round. During the first round matches, Dan Wheldon was issued a 3-second penalty for a tire out-of-bounds, but he would have lost either way. Scott Sharp lost to Bryan Herta due to a 5-second penalty for a missing lug nut. The matchup between Sam Hornish Jr. and Dario Franchitti was re-run due to a timing and scoring malfunction. During the quarterfinals, a rain shower halted the event for about 25 minutes. The finals pitted Penske versus Andretti Green, with the crew of Sam Hornish Jr. defeating Bryan Herta. It was the first and only victory in the event for Hornish, and the eighth overall for Penske.

First Round
6 | Sam Hornish Jr. (Team Penske) | 8.7665
27 | Dario Franchitti (Andretti Green) | 9.2941
11 | Tony Kanaan (Andretti Green) | 7.7859
26 | Dan Wheldon (Andretti Green) | 12.4300
7 | Bryan Herta (Andretti Green) | 10.8687
8 | Scott Sharp (Fernández Racing) | 13.7873
51 | Alex Barron (Cheever Racing) | 9.3210
4 | Tomas Scheckter (Panther Racing) | 9.5880

Quarterfinals
6 | Sam Hornish Jr. (Team Penske) | 8.0835
3 | Hélio Castroneves (Team Penske) | 8.2602
9 | Scott Dixon (Chip Ganassi Racing) | 9.4347
11 | Tony Kanaan (Andretti Green) | 10.2589
7 | Bryan Herta (Andretti Green) | 10.0612
17 | Vítor Meira (Rahal Letterman) | no time
15 | Kenny Bräck (Rahal Letterman) | 8.9887
51 | Alex Barron (Cheever Racing) | 10.6689

Semifinals
6 | Sam Hornish Jr. (Team Penske) | 8.4064
9 | Scott Dixon (Chip Ganassi Racing) | 9.3444
7 | Bryan Herta (Andretti Green) | 10.1662
15 | Kenny Bräck (Rahal Letterman) | no time

Finals
6 | Sam Hornish Jr. (Team Penske) | 8.9704
7 | Bryan Herta (Andretti Green) | 9.9170

== Race summary ==
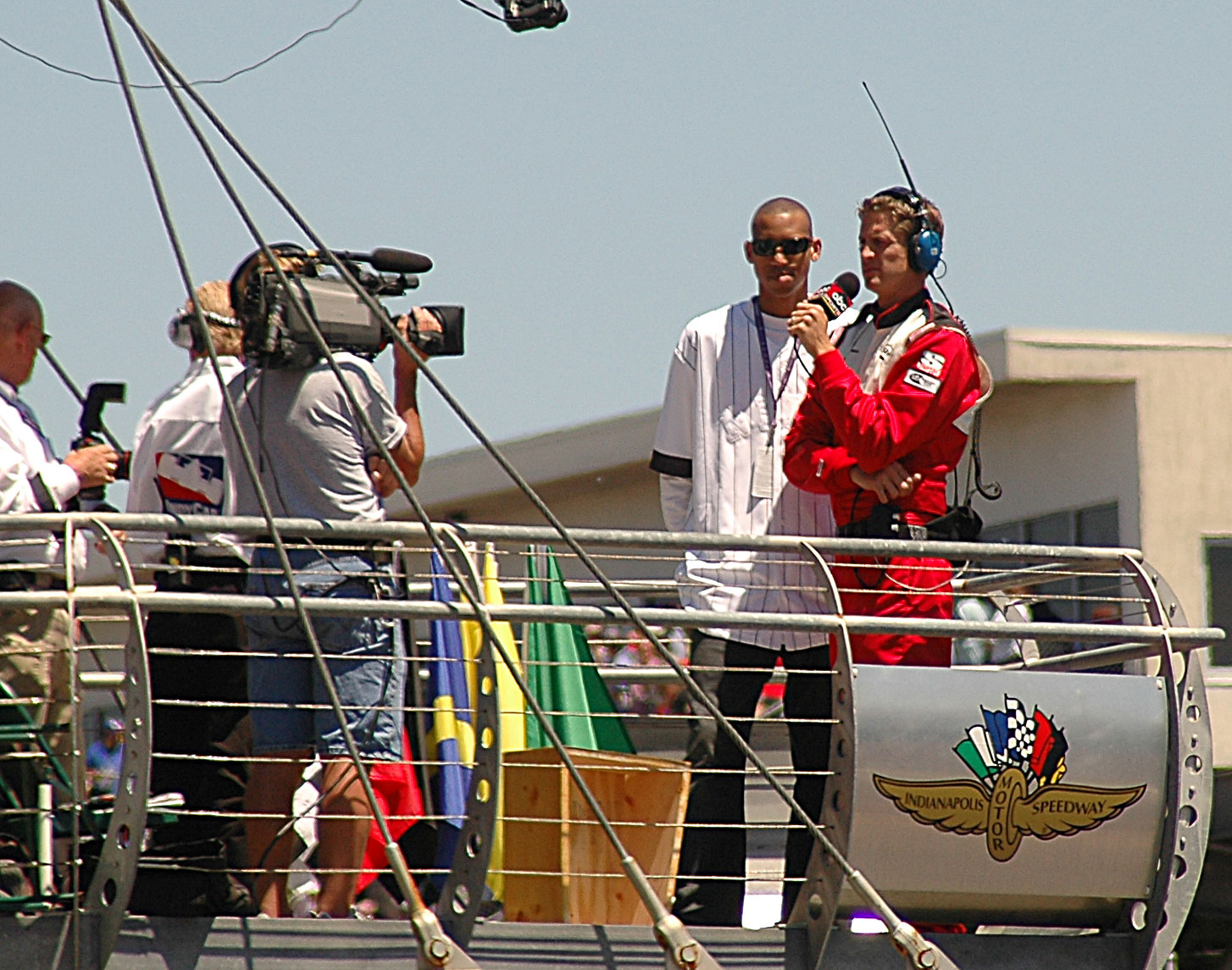
Honorary starter Reggie Miller in the starter's stand

=== Start ===
Race day emerged warm and sunny, with temperatures in the mid 70s (°F), and no chance of rain. Speedway chairperson Mari Hulman George gave the command to start engines at 11:58 a.m. (EST). The field assembled for 2 parade laps and 1 pace lap behind the Chevrolet Corvette C6 pace car, driven by Colin Powell.

At the start, a very well-aligned field saw polesitter Tony Kanaan take the lead into Turn 1. The field circulated safely through the 1st lap. In Turn 3, Sam Hornish Jr. passed Kanaan for the lead, and led the 1st lap. Kanaan re-took the lead on lap 3. The duo traded the lead once more before Larry Foyt crashed on lap 18, bringing out the first caution. Foyt would be hospitalized by the crash.

Most of the leaders pitted under the yellow, and Kanaan won the race off the pit road.

=== First half ===
Sam Hornish Jr. took the lead on lap 38, and the race began to settle into a pace. On lap 55, a series of green flag pit stops shuffled the field momentarily. Hornish ducked into the pits first, followed by Kanaan. The shuffle brought Danica Patrick to the lead on lap 56. It marked the 1st time in Indy 500 history that a female driver led a lap in competition. She pitted the next time around, and Hornish emerged once again as the leader.

On lap 78, Bruno Junqueira went to pass the lap car of A. J. Foyt IV in turn 2. The two cars touched, and Junqueira crashed hard into the outside wall. He suffered a concussion and fractured vertebrae. The previous week, Junqueira had taken the points lead in the Champ Car World Series championship, and his injuries would force him to miss the rest of the season.

Kenny Bräck headed for the pits on lap 82 with mechanical trouble. The car eventually dropped out due to a broken wishbone suspension.

As they approached the halfway point, Hornish and Kanaan again battled back and forth for the lead.

=== Second half ===
On lap 114, Richie Hearn and Scott Dixon tangled and crashed in Turn 1. On the restart, Kanaan and Dario Franchitti passed Hornish on the front stretch, and pulled away from the field.

On lap 147, Sam Hornish Jr. went to pass Sébastien Bourdais on the outside of Turn 1. He slid high, and smacked the outside wall. The leaders pitted on lap 149, which meant that only 1 more fuel stop would be required for each car. Exiting the pits, Bryan Herta was penalized for speeding on pit road, and was moved to the rear of the field for the upcoming restart.

On 155, the field prepared to go back to green. Accelerating in the north short chute, Danica Patrick, running 8th, did a half-spin, and tagged Tomáš Enge. Tomas Scheckter spun to avoid the crash, and wrecked into the inside wall. Jeff Bucknum, Patrick Carpentier, and Jaques Lazier also got caught up in the melee. Patrick damaged her nosecone and left front wing, and ducked immediately into the pits. The team replaced the nose of the car, then a second pit stop (lap 159) saw her change tires and top off the fuel. Patrick dropped to 11th, the last car on the lead lap. Just before the restart on lap 161, Bryan Herta ducked into the pits, and topped off the fuel. The team intended to go the distance without another pit stop.

=== Finish ===
With 30 laps to go, Dan Wheldon led Vitor Meira. Roger Yasukawa brought out the yellow when his car blew its engine down the front stretch. All of the leaders except Patrick and Herta went to the pits. Staying out, Patrick and Herta shuffled up to the front of the field. Patrick took the lead for the 2nd time of the day on lap 172, and led Herta on the lap 173 restart. To the delight of the crowd, Patrick pulled out to a 1-second lead. Her crew instructed her to dial down the fuel mixture (in an effort to make it to the finish), and her lead began to dwindle. Dan Wheldon caught her on lap 186, and took the lead. At the same time, Kosuke Matsuura hit the wall in the exit of Turn 4.

With 10 laps to go, the green flag came back out. Patrick darted around Wheldon, and took the lead into Turn 1. She held the lead for 3 laps. With 7 laps to go, Wheldon passed her once again, and pulled out to a lead. With less than 3 laps to go, Vítor Meira and Bryan Herta managed to get by Patrick, while Wheldon continued to pull away. Down the back stretch with less than 1½ laps to go, Buddy Lazier passed Sébastien Bourdais on the outside for 5th place. Bourdais got loose in Turn 3, and crashed into the outside wall. The yellow and white flags were displayed, and 1 lap later, Dan Wheldon won the race under caution.

Bryan Herta's fuel strategy worked out, and he came home 3rd. Danica Patrick held on to 4th place, beating Janet Guthrie's Indy 500 record (9th place in 1978) for the best finish by a female driver. Buddy Lazier finished a strong 5th, despite nursing a broken front wing after contact by Scott Sharp.

== Box score ==
| Finish | Start | Car No. | Driver | Chassis | Engine | Qual | Laps | Status | Team |
|---|---|---|---|---|---|---|---|---|---|
| 1 | 16 | 26 | (United Kingdom) Dan Wheldon | Dallara | Honda | 224.308 | 200 | 157.603 mph | Andretti Green Racing |
| 2 | 7 | 17 | (Brazil) Vítor Meira | Panoz | Honda | 226.848 | 200 | +0.1302 | Rahal Letterman Racing |
| 3 | 18 | 7 | (United States) Bryan Herta | Dallara | Honda | 223.972 | 200 | +0.2061 | Andretti Green Racing |
| 4 | 4 | 16 | (United States) Danica Patrick R | Panoz | Honda | 227.004 | 200 | +4.5515 | Rahal Letterman Racing |
| 5 | 9 | 95 | (United States) Buddy Lazier W | Dallara | Chevrolet | 226.353 | 200 | +4.8047 | Panther Racing |
| 6 | 6 | 27 | (United Kingdom) Dario Franchitti | Dallara | Honda | 226.873 | 200 | +5.1450 | Andretti Green Racing |
| 7 | 3 | 8 | (United States) Scott Sharp | Panoz | Honda | 227.126 | 200 | +5.5795 | Fernandez Racing |
| 8 | 1 | 11 | (Brazil) Tony Kanaan | Dallara | Honda | 227.566 | 200 | +6.3527 | Andretti Green Racing |
| 9 | 5 | 3 | (Brazil) Hélio Castroneves W | Dallara | Toyota | 226.927 | 200 | +7.7687 | Team Penske |
| 10 | 24 | 33 | (Australia) Ryan Briscoe R | Panoz | Toyota | 224.080 | 199 | -1 Lap | Chip Ganassi Racing |
| 11 | 26 | 20 | (United States) Ed Carpenter | Dallara | Toyota | 221.439 | 199 | -1 Lap | Vision Racing |
| 12 | 15 | 37 | (France) Sébastien Bourdais R | Panoz | Honda | 224.955 | 198 | Crash T3 | Newman/Haas Racing |
| 13 | 22 | 51 | (United States) Alex Barron | Dallara | Toyota | 221.053 | 197 | -3 Laps | Team Cheever |
| 14 | 14 | 5 | (Mexico) Adrián Fernández | Panoz | Honda | 225.120 | 197 | -3 Laps | Fernandez Racing |
| 15 | 33 | 48 | (Brazil) Felipe Giaffone | Panoz | Toyota | 217.645 | 194 | -6 Laps | A. J. Foyt Enterprises |
| 16 | 27 | 21 | (United States) Jaques Lazier | Panoz | Toyota | 221.228 | 189 | -11 Laps | Playa Del Racing |
| 17 | 8 | 55 | (Japan) Kosuke Matsuura | Panoz | Honda | 226.397 | 186 | Crash T4 | Super Aguri Fernandez Racing |
| 18 | 17 | 24 | (United States) Roger Yasukawa | Dallara | Honda | 224.131 | 167 | Mechanical | Dreyer & Reinbold Racing |
| 19 | 10 | 2 | (Czech Republic) Tomáš Enge R | Dallara | Chevrolet | 226.107 | 155 | Crash T4 | Panther Racing |
| 20 | 11 | 4 | (South Africa) Tomas Scheckter | Dallara | Chevrolet | 226.031 | 154 | Crash T4 | Panther Racing |
| 21 | 25 | 83 | (Canada) Patrick Carpentier R | Dallara | Toyota | 222.803 | 153 | Mechanical | Team Cheever |
| 22 | 21 | 44 | (United States) Jeff Bucknum R | Dallara | Honda | 221.521 | 150 | Crash T4 | Dreyer & Reinbold Racing |
| 23 | 2 | 6 | (United States) Sam Hornish Jr. | Dallara | Toyota | 227.273 | 146 | Crash T1 | Team Penske |
| 24 | 13 | 9 | (New Zealand) Scott Dixon | Panoz | Toyota | 225.215 | 113 | Crash T1 | Chip Ganassi Racing |
| 25 | 20 | 70 | (United States) Richie Hearn | Panoz | Chevrolet | 222.707 | 112 | Crash T1 | Sam Schmidt Motorsports |
| 26 | 23 | 15 | (Sweden) Kenny Bräck W | Panoz | Honda | 227.598 | 92 | Mechanical | Rahal Letterman Racing |
| 27 | 31 | 22 | (United States) Jeff Ward | Dallara | Toyota | 218.714 | 92 | Handling | Vision Racing |
| 28 | 28 | 14 | (United States) A. J. Foyt IV | Dallara | Toyota | 220.442 | 84 | Handling | A. J. Foyt Enterprises |
| 29 | 19 | 10 | (United Kingdom) Darren Manning | Panoz | Toyota | 223.943 | 82 | Mechanical | Chip Ganassi Racing |
| 30 | 12 | 36 | (Brazil) Bruno Junqueira | Panoz | Honda | 225.704 | 76 | Crash T2 | Newman/Haas Racing |
| 31 | 29 | 25 | (Canada) Marty Roth | Dallara | Chevrolet | 219.497 | 47 | Handling | Roth Racing |
| 32 | 32 | 91 | (United States) Jimmy Kite | Dallara | Toyota | 218.565 | 47 | Handling | Hemelgarn Racing |
| 33 | 30 | 41 | (United States) Larry Foyt | Dallara | Toyota | 219.396 | 14 | Crash T2 | A. J. Foyt Enterprises |

W Former Indianapolis 500 winner

R Indianapolis 500 Rookie

All entrants utilized Firestone tires.

=== Race statistics ===
7 drivers led the race, with a total of 27 lead changes.

Lap Leaders
| Laps | Leader |
|---|---|
| 1–2 | Sam Hornish Jr. |
| 3 | Tony Kanaan |
| 4–7 | Sam Hornish Jr. |
| 8–25 | Tony Kanaan |
| 26 | Dario Franchitti |
| 27–37 | Tony Kanaan |
| 38–54 | Sam Hornish Jr. |
| 55 | Dario Franchitti |
| 56 | Danica Patrick |
| 57–58 | Bruno Junqueira |
| 59–97 | Sam Hornish Jr. |
| 98–100 | Tony Kanaan |
| 101–111 | Sam Hornish Jr. |
| 112–115 | Tony Kanaan |
| 116–119 | Sam Hornish Jr. |
| 120–122 | Tony Kanaan |
| 123 | Dario Franchitti |
| 124–135 | Tony Kanaan |
| 136–143 | Dario Franchitti |
| 144–145 | Tony Kanaan |
| 146–149 | Dario Franchitti |
| 150–161 | Dan Wheldon |
| 162–164 | Vítor Meira |
| 165–171 | Dan Wheldon |
| 172–185 | Danica Patrick |
| 186–189 | Dan Wheldon |
| 190–193 | Danica Patrick |
| 194–200 | Dan Wheldon |

Total laps led
| Driver | Laps |
|---|---|
| Sam Hornish Jr. | 77 |
| Tony Kanaan | 54 |
| Dan Wheldon | 30 |
| Danica Patrick | 19 |
| Dario Franchitti | 15 |
| Vítor Meira | 3 |
| Bruno Junqueira | 2 |

Cautions: 8 for 46 laps
| Laps | Reason |
|---|---|
| 18–24 | Larry Foyt crash in turn 2 |
| 77–86 | Bruno Junqueira, A. J. Foyt IV crash in turn 2 |
| 114–119 | Scott Dixon, Richie Hearn crash in turn 1 |
| 147–154 | Sam Hornish Jr. crash in turn 1 |
| 155–161 | Enge, Scheckter, Patrick, Bucknum crash in northchute |
| 171–173 | Roger Yasukawa car smoking |
| 187–189 | Kosuke Matsuura crash in turn 4 |
| 199–200 | Sébastien Bourdais crash in turn 3 |

== Aftermath ==
The massive media attention going into the race delivered a high television rating, and brought the IndyCar Series back into the limelight after several slumping years. Dan Wheldon rode the wave of success to six total victories in 2005, and clinched the 2005 IndyCar Series championship.

Danica Patrick, however, emerged from the race as the biggest star. She was interviewed on Good Morning America the morning after the race, and appeared on the cover of Sports Illustrated. Patrick became a household name nearly overnight, and became a "watercooler" topic.

2 weeks after the race, other drivers in the series started to embrace and make light of the attention. Race winner Dan Wheldon wore a t shirt stating "I actually 'won' the Indy 500." Buddy Rice, the 2004 Indy 500 winner sported a shirt saying "Danica's teammate," while Vítor Meira, who finished 2nd wore a shirt with "Danica's other teammate."

== Broadcasting ==
=== Radio ===
The race was carried live on the Indianapolis Motor Speedway Radio Network. Mike King served as chief announcer. Pancho Carter served as "driver expert", a role he also participated as in 1988.

The four turn reporters remained the same from the previous year. In the pit area Kim Morris and Jim Murphy departed. Joining the crew were Nicole Manske and USAC Midget champion Kevin Olson. During the pre-race, Olson interviewed David Letterman, a segment of the broadcast that would become a fixture in subsequent years.

Among the special guests interviewed in the booth were former Secretary of State Colin Powell and the recently elected Governor of Indiana Mitch Daniels. Sponsor guests interviewed in the booth included Tim Manganello (BorgWarner), Keith Sirios (Checkers and Rally's), Al Spire (Firestone), John Middlebrook (GM), and Keith Newman (Jim Beam).

Indy Racing Radio Network
| Booth Announcers | Turn Reporters | Pit/garage reporters |
|---|---|---|
| Chief Announcer: Mike King; Driver expert: Pancho Carter; Historian: Donald Davidson; Color analyst: Dave Wilson; Commentary: Chris Economaki | Turn 1: Jerry Baker; Turn 2: Adam Alexander; Turn 3: Mark Jaynes; Turn 4: Chris Denari | Dave Argabright (north pits); Nicole Manske (center pits); Kevin Lee (south pits); Kevin Olson (garages/hospital) |

=== Television ===
For 2005, ABC Sports replaced veteran announcer Paul Page with Todd Harris. Harris had previously covered the World's Strongest Man competitions, and worked as a sideline–pit reporter. However, he was inexperienced in anchoring live sports, and did not personally pursue the role. Harris was joined by analyst Scott Goodyear in the booth. Gone from the broadcast was veteran Paul Page, who had covered the 500 on television or radio dating back to 1974.

Also new to the broadcast was Brent Musburger, who took over the host role.

The "Wide World of Sports" telecast opened with the pre-race billed as "Firestone Race Day". The opening teaser entitled "Speed City", created by Brice Bowman of Earshot Audio Post, would eventually earn a Sports Emmy for "Outstanding post-produced audio/sound".

ABC Television (blacked out locally)
| Booth Announcers | Pit/garage reporters |
|---|---|
| Host: Brent Musburger; Announcer: Todd Harris; Color: Scott Goodyear | Jack Arute; Vince Welch; Dr. Jerry Punch; Jamie Little; Penn Holderness |

=== Controversy ===
Going into the race broadcast, one of the most significant stories of the month was Danica Patrick qualifying 4th, and having a legitimate chance to win the race. ABC Sports planned to focus considerably on Patrick during the pre-race and race running. Many felt that ABC was ignoring the other drivers, including polesitter Tony Kanaan and eventual winner Dan Wheldon. In the days after the race, ABC, and Harris in particular, were largely criticised by columnists and bloggers for poor coverage, and for biased and subjective coverage of Patrick.

It was pointed out that despite the close attention, neither Harris nor Goodyear noticed that Patrick had taken the lead during a sequence of pit stops on lap 56. Nine laps later, as ABC returned from commercial, Harris mentioned Patrick having taken the lead for the first time. His comments were criticised as he said she "...turned the trick..." (usually a sexual reference), and that "Fifty years from now you will remember where you were when Danica Patrick made not only motorsports history, but she joined the likes of Amelia Earhart and Sally Ride in a barrier-breaking performance..." Of which Jerry Greene of the Orlando Sentinel wrote "I seriously doubt it, Todd." Greene also wrote that Harris "said many stupid things Sunday because of Ms. Patrick's efforts."

Richard Sandomir wrote that Harris and Goodyear faltered in three distinct instances late in the race. With 13 laps to go, they closely examined Dan Wheldon taking the lead by the nose of the car at the line repeatedly when a caution came out. It was portrayed as if they were racing back to the caution. However, such was not allowed under Indy Racing League rules. It was later observed that the caution light did not turn on until the cars were in turn 1 (well after Wheldon had completed the pass), and the attention focused at the start–finish line was misguided, misleading, and irrelevant.

Three laps later, Harris awkwardly waited ten seconds before noting that Patrick had re-taken the lead on the restart. When Wheldon took the lead for good on lap 193, Harris again hesitated, and waited 20 seconds to report the move, and another 30 seconds to report that Patrick had dropped to 4th place. Sandomir also criticized a perceived "softball" post-race interview of Patrick by Jerry Punch.

Houston Chronicle writer David Barron said during the pre-race show and the race's first 90 minutes, he "counted an average of one Patrick reference every five minutes, and each reference went on for some time." Others blogged that ABC was intentionally bringing attention to Patrick's looks, at the same time trying to downplay them.

With all the hoopla regarding Danica Patrick it was also seen as interesting by some that the song that was played during the closing credits of the broadcast was a song by the title "Luckiest Man Alive" by the Finn Brothers. Some felt that while jumping on the Danica hype for all it was worth this pointed to ABC never really taking the idea seriously that she might actually win. Of course there could've been another version of the closing credits with another song available if she had won but no one at ABC has ever commented on it.

At the end of the 2005 season, Todd Harris was removed from the booth, and replaced with veteran Marty Reid.

== Gallery ==
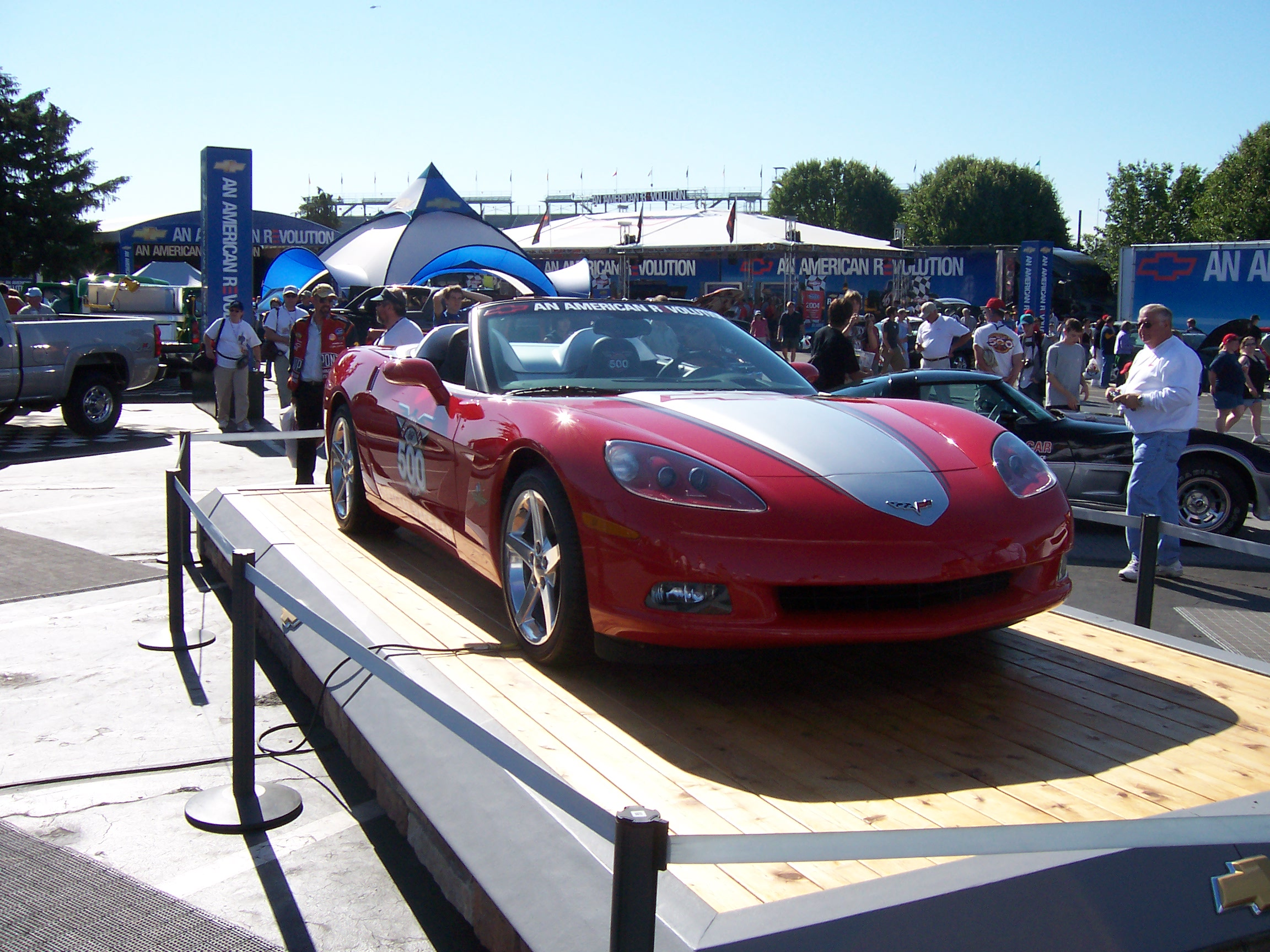
2005 Chevrolet Corvette pace car

== Notes ==
=== Works cited ===
- 2005 Indianapolis 500 Daily Trackside Report for the Media
- Indianapolis 500 History: Race & All-Time Stats - Official Site

| 2004 Indianapolis 500; Buddy Rice | 2005 Indianapolis 500; Dan Wheldon | 2006 Indianapolis 500; Sam Hornish Jr. |
