= 2003 Indianapolis 500 =

American motor race

87th Indianapolis 500
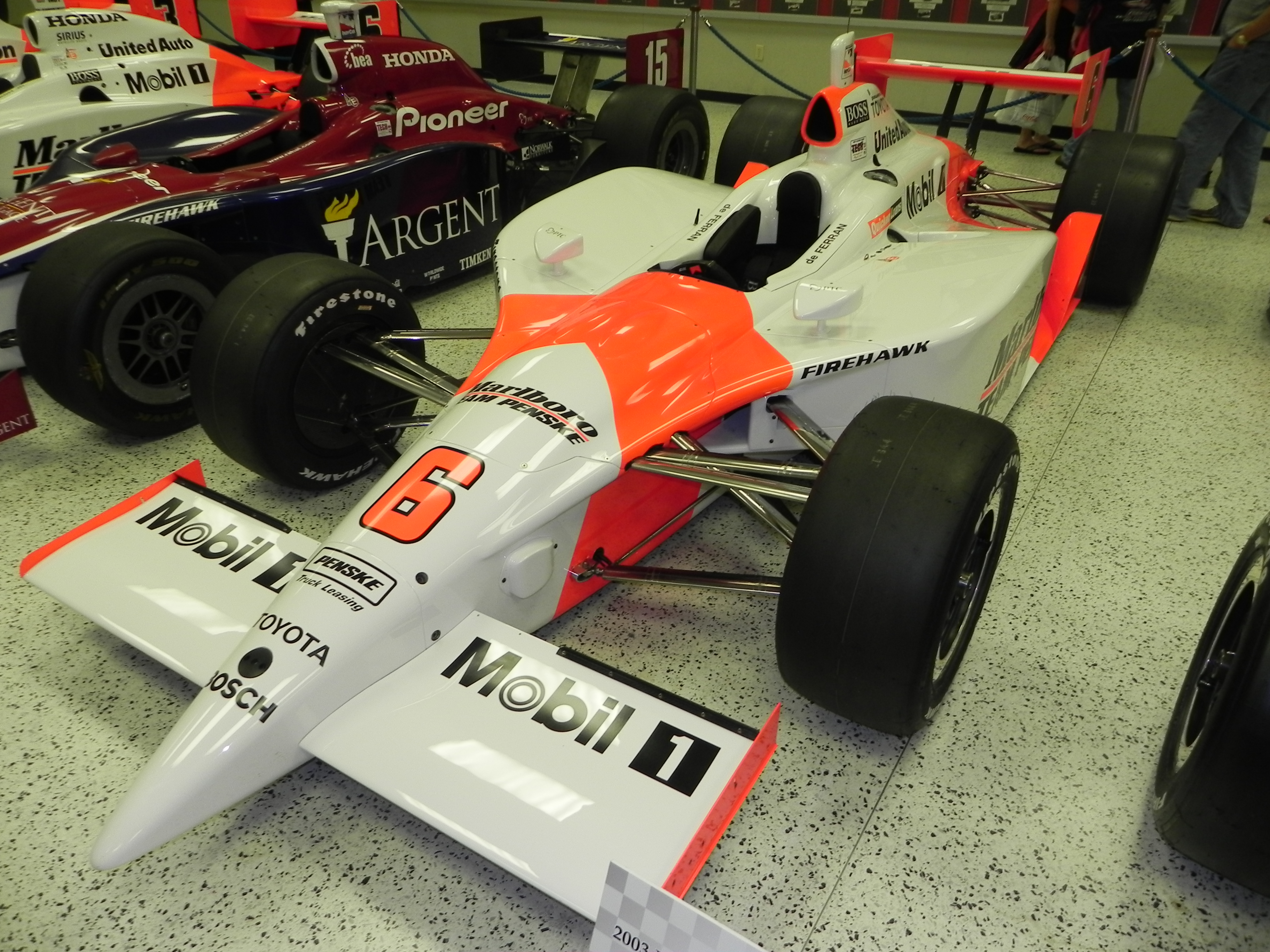

Indianapolis Motor Speedway

Indianapolis 500
- Sanctioning body: Indy Racing League
- Season: 2003 IndyCar season
- Date: May 25, 2003
- Winner: (Brazil) Gil de Ferran
- Winning team: Penske Racing
- Winning Chief Mechanic: Matt Jonsson
- Time of race: 3:11:56.9891
- Average speed: 156.291 mph
- Pole position: (Brazil) Hélio Castroneves
- Pole speed: 231.725 mph
- Fastest qualifier: (Brazil) Hélio Castroneves
- Rookie of the Year: (Japan) Tora Takagi
- Most laps led: (South Africa) Tomas Scheckter (63)

Pre-race ceremonies
- National anthem: Daniel Rodriguez
- "Back Home Again in Indiana": Jim Nabors
- Starting command: Mari Hulman George
- Pace car: Chevrolet SSR
- Pace car driver: Herb Fishel
- Starter: Bryan Howard
- Estimated attendance: 300,000 (estimated)

Television in the United States
- Network: ABC
- Announcers: Paul Page, Scott Goodyear
- Nielsen ratings: 4.6 / 14

Chronology
Previous	Next
2002	2004

The 87th Indianapolis 500 was held at the Indianapolis Motor Speedway in Speedway, Indiana on Sunday, May 25, 2003. Two-time defending champion Hélio Castroneves won the pole position and was trying to become the first driver in Indy history to win three in a row. With 31 laps to go, however, Castroneves was passed by his Team Penske teammate Gil de Ferran. The duo finished 1st–2nd, with de Ferran winning his first and only Indy 500. It was Penske's second 1–2 finish (after 2001). The race was sanctioned by the Indy Racing League and was part of the 2003 IndyCar Series season.

For the 2003 season, the series adopted a new chassis package and saw the introduction of Toyota and Honda to the field. It was Honda's third period of involvement at Indy. They partnered with the Judd program in the 1987 race, and was an engine provider in CART in 1990s, entering at Indy in 1994–1995. Their return in 2003 started a more than two-decade period of involvement, which is still continuous as of 2026. Honda's third-place finish (with Tony Kanaan) was their best-ever Indy result at the time, a precursor to their first Indy victory, which would come in a year later. Toyota, previously an engine provider in CART, was making their first-ever attempt at Indy. They won in their first outing and recorded the first Indy 500 win for a Japanese engine manufacturer. But it would prove to be Toyota's only Indy 500 victory – they would depart IndyCar after 2005 and instead allocate their efforts towards NASCAR.

Due to cost issues, and a shortage of engines and drivers, there was considerable concern going into the month of May that the field might fall short of the traditional 33 starters. On the final day of qualifying, the field was filled, avoiding a PR "black eye". No cars were bumped from the field for the first time since 1947.

Former presidents George H. W. Bush and Bill Clinton were in attendance, the first time in Indy history that two former presidents were at the race. It was the elder Bush's second visit to the Speedway; he previously presided over the opening ceremonies of the 1987 Pan American Games, which was held at the track. Rookie A. J. Foyt IV, racing on his 19th birthday, became the youngest driver ever to compete in the race.

For the first time since the 1970s, the race was not announced as a sell-out. Since 1985, the race was usually sold out by July of the previous year.

== Background ==
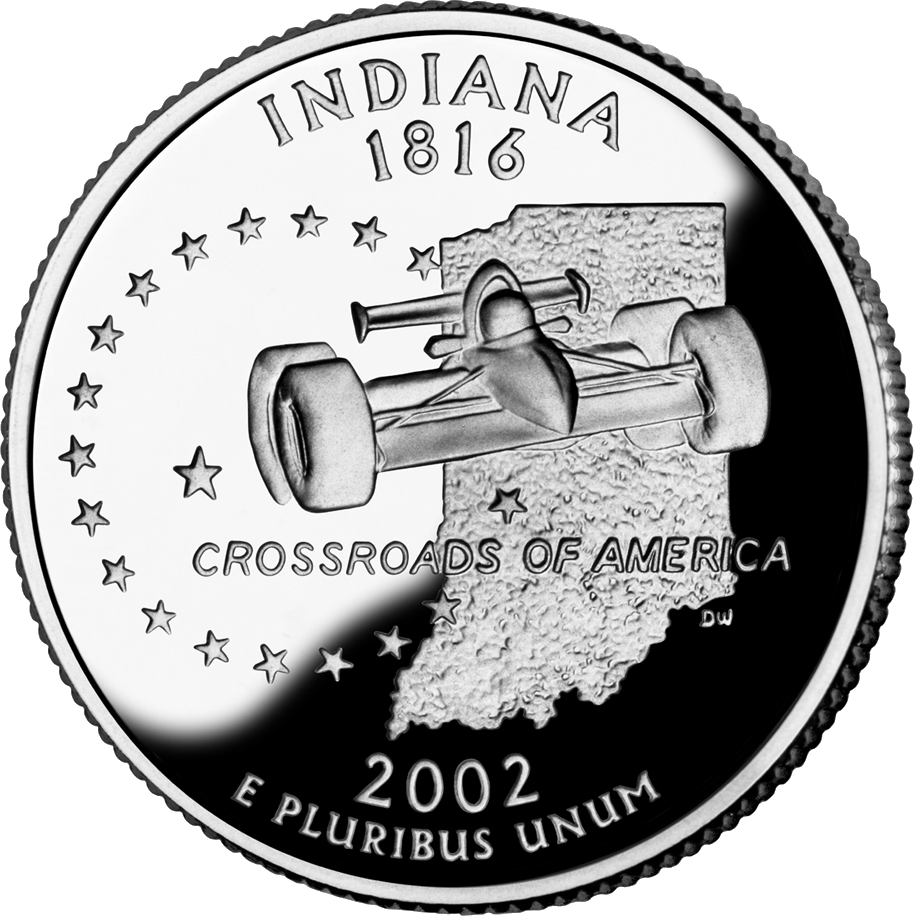
The Indiana design of the 50 State Quarters program depicting an IndyCar was released the previous summer on August 8, 2002.

The biggest interest story going into the race was the impending retirement of popular veteran Michael Andretti. Andretti announced that the 2003 Indy 500 would be his final race, and that he would retire from driving immediately after, to focus on team ownership. (Note that Andretti came out of retirement and returned to drive at Indy in 2006–2007.)

The open wheel "Split" continued into what was now its eighth year. However, nearly all of the top teams and drivers from CART entered at Indy for 2003. It was the fourth consecutive year that CART-based teams entered the Indy 500, and each successive year had seen an increased number of participants "crossing over". The 2003 season was a turning point in the "Split", as several teams, including Penske, Andretti Green, Ganassi, and Rahal pulled out of CART and defected permanently to the Indy Racing League full-time. One of the few holdouts in 2003 was Newman/Haas Racing. Paul Tracy, a key fixture in the controversial 2002 race (who was driving for Forsythe), also did not enter.

During the spring Dario Franchitti of Andretti Green Racing was injured in a motorcycle accident, which sidelined him for most of the season. Robby Gordon replaced him in the car at Indy, and Gordon planned to attempt the Indy-Charlotte "Double Duty".

After changes in the rules, Greg Ray entered and qualified a car carrying the number 13. It was the first time #13 appeared on a car at the Indy 500 since George Mason in 1914. From 1926 to 2002, usage of #13 was not permitted, and throughout the entire history of the race, was generally avoided by competitors due to superstitions.

For the first time ever, a support race was scheduled for the month of May at Indy. The Menards Infiniti Pro Series arrived at the Speedway for the inaugural Freedom 100. The race was scheduled for the Saturday of Bump Day weekend.

=== Mario Andretti crash ===
Andretti-Green Racing driver, Tony Kanaan, suffered a radial fracture of his arm on April 15 in a crash at Motegi. On April 23, the 1969 Indianapolis 500 winner Mario Andretti took over Kanaan's car for a test session. Andretti retired in 1994, and this was the first time in nine years he had driven a major open-wheel car. If Kanaan was not cleared to drive in enough time, tentative plans were being prepared for Andretti to qualify the car for him. He would then turn the car over to Kanaan on race day. No firm plans had yet been made though for Andretti to actually drive in the race.

During Andretti's test session, it was noted by many observers that despite his lack of experience in modern Indy cars (which had changed substantially since his retirement in 1994) and his advanced age (63), he quickly reached competitive speed. During the morning session, he turned a lap of 212.509 mph, and looked "as if he had never been away." Later in the day, he upped his speed to over 223 mph. The success of the test created a stir, and speculation grew during the afternoon that Andretti may even attempt to qualify for the race.

With only two minutes left in the session, Kenny Bräck crashed in turn one, and the yellow light came on. Andretti entered turn one at full speed, and struck debris on the track from Bräck's crash. The object, identified by some as the rear wing, or possibly a piece of foam from the impacted SAFER barrier, pitched the nose of Andretti's car upward, and the car became airborne. The car then went into a rapid double-reverse somersault flip at speeds exceeding 200 miles per hour. Television footage from the WTHR helicopter-cam showed that the car clipped the top of the debris fence, and was nearly high enough to go over it. The car fell back to the racing surface, slowed by its mid-air tumble, and slid to a stop upright. Andretti walked away from the crash with very minor injuries.

Andretti initially shrugged off the accident, and still contemplated returning to qualify the car in May. A day later, however, he reconsidered.

== Race schedule ==
Race schedule — April/May, 2003
Sun	Mon	Tue	Wed	Thu	Fri	Sat
20	21; ROP	22; Testing	23; Testing	24	25	26
27	28	29	30	1	2	3 Mini-Marathon
4 Opening Day	5 Practice	6 Practice	7 Practice	8 Practice	9 Practice	10; Pole Day
11; Pole Day	12	13	14; Practice	15; Practice	16; Practice	17; Practice
18; Time Trials	19	20	21	22; Carb Day	23	24; Parade
25; Indy 500	26; Memorial Day	27	28	29	20	31

Color	Notes
Green	Practice
Dark Blue	Time trials
Silver	Race day
Red	Rained out*
Blank	No track activity

* Includes days where track activity
was significantly limited due to rain

ROP — denotes Rookie Orientation Program

== Practice and time trials ==
Practice opened on Sunday May 4, with roughly 29 car/driver combinations named to the field. That was short of the traditional 33 starters for the race, and there was ongoing speculation around the garage area on who would potentially fill the four open spots. At the onset, drivers were flirting with the 230 mph barrier.

On Tuesday May 6, rookie Dan Wheldon (231.108 mph) became the first driver to break the 230 mph barrier. A day later, Kenny Bräck (231.039 mph) also broke 231 mph. Wheldon set the fastest lap of the month on Thursday May 8 at 232.202 mph, the fastest lap run at the Speedway since 1996.

On "Fast Friday" May 9, Arie Luyendyk spun exiting turn one, and hit the outside wall with the back end of the car. The car slid down the track, and hit the outside wall in turn 2 also. Luyendyk suffered a back injury, and soreness in his neck and shoulders. Ultimately, Luyendyk decided to sit out the race, and retired from driving permanently.

Pole qualifying was originally scheduled for Saturday May 10. During the morning practice session Billy Boat spun coming out of turn four, and made heavy contact with the safety attenuator at the north end of the pit wall. The car hit with the back end, flew up into the air momentarily, and came to rest against the outside wall on the mainstretch. The energy-absorbing barrier was demolished, but officials stated that the barrier withstood the impact, and worked effectively. Boat was transferred to Methodist Hospital for observation, but was eventually released and cleared to drive. Before the track crews could replace the damaged barrier, rain began to fall. A violent thunderstorm swept through the area, and washed out qualifying for the afternoon.

=== Pole Day ===
Pole qualifying was rescheduled for Sunday May 11. The weather was cool and windy. Robbie Buhl was the first car to make an attempt, and he put his car the field with a safe run of 224.369 mph. At 12:30 p.m., rookie Scott Dixon (230.099 mph) was the first car over 230 mph. At 12:45 p.m., Robby Gordon (230.205 mph) took over the provisional pole position.

At 12:55 p.m., rookie A. J. Foyt IV was attempting to become the youngest driver ever to qualify for the Indy 500. On his first lap, he spun exiting turn 2, did not hit the wall, and slid backwards down nearly the entire length of the backstretch. He was uninjured.

The first trip through the qualifying line was completed at about 1:45 p.m. Several drivers had pulled out of line, waiting for better conditions. At 2:41 p.m., Tony Kanaan took over the top spot with a run of 231.006 mph.

At 4:36 p.m., two-time defending race winner Hélio Castroneves (231.725 mph) secured the pole position. Tony Kanaan was bumped to the middle of the front row, and Robby Gordon held on to the outside of the front row. The day ended with A. J. Foyt IV completing a run, and Gil de Ferran, the last car with a realistic shot of the front row, turning in a somewhat-disappointing 228.633 mph, good enough only for 10th starting position.

=== Bump Day ===
The track closed for two days and practice resumed on Wednesday May 14. The final day of time trials was scheduled for Sunday May 18. Alex Barron was named to replace Arie Luyendyk at Mo Nunn Racing. Only 32 car/driver combinations had materialized, leaving concerns about the prospects of filling the field to the traditional 33 starters. Airton Daré and Vítor Meira were named to rides on Sunday morning, meaning there were now nine cars preparing to qualify. Among the fastest drivers who had yet to qualify were Jimmy Vasser (228.275 mph) and Alex Barron (227.714 mph). Vasser missed the first weekend of time trials due to his participation in the Champ Car German 500.

Qualifying opened with nine spots open in the field. Time trials opened at 12:30 p.m., with Jimmy Kite the first car out. After two fast laps, however, the car stalled with an electrical problem. In the first half-hour, three cars qualified, led by Jimmy Vasser, and the field was up to 27 cars.

Jimmy Kite returned to the track, this time qualifying without incident. Airton Daré stalled several times trying to leave the pits, but after repairs, he qualified to fill the field to 29 cars. Just before 2 p.m., Alex Barron and Richie Hearn completed runs, and the field was up to 31 cars. Hearn's team acquired a Penske back-up car, and he was safely in the field.

At 3 p.m., there were two spots left in the field. Only two cars remained on the sidelines, Robby McGehee and Vítor Meira. No other teams were planning on qualifying, although a rumor circulated around the garage area that Ganassi was considering on wheeling out a backup car for Jeff Ward. McGehee (224.493 mph) completed his qualifying attempt at 3:30 p.m., leaving only one spot open in the grid. At 4:05 p.m., Meira (227.158 mph) filled the field to 33 cars. At that point, the track was opened for practice, and the track officially closed at 6 o'clock without any other qualifiers.

The series avoided the embarrassment of not filling the field to the traditional 33 cars. The race had not failed to do so since 1947, when several drivers that were members of ASPAR (the American Society of Professional Auto Racing) threatened to boycott the race over the purse size. Nonetheless, some members of the media chastised the effort, later nicknaming the afternoon "Fill Day" rather than the traditional Bump Day. During the television coverage, Bob Jenkins and Jack Arute passionately defended the event from its detractors. Despite pointing out the lack of drama on the final day of time trials, Robin Miller was among those who suggested that the 2003 field was the deepest talent-wise since the open-wheel "split".

== Carb Day ==
The final practice was scheduled for Thursday May 22. A total of 32 of the 33 cars took laps. Robby McGehee did not participate as the crew was working on mechanical problems. The green flag came out at 11 a.m. On his first lap out of the pits, Buddy Rice suffered a brake lock-up, which caused him to spin in turn four. The car was not damaged, and he was able to return to the track about ten minutes later. Shinji Nakano stalled on the track out of fuel, and Sam Hornish Jr. suffered a minor engine fire.

Kenny Bräck (228.707 mph) was the fastest of the day. Robby Gordon, who was attempting Double Duty, stayed for the first half hour. He turned a lap of 227.850 mph, which proved to be the second fastest of the day. Then at approximately 11:30 a.m., he got out of the car and departed for Charlotte.

=== Pit Stop Challenge ===
The 27th annual Checkers and Rally's Pit Stop Challenge was held Thursday May 22. Twelve teams competed in a single-elimination bracket. Seven participants were named to the event based on their pit stop performance at IRL/IndyCar Series races since the previous year's Indy 500 and three spots were filled by entrant points. The final two berths were up for grabs during a last-chance qualifying session on May 14. Tony Kanaan and Michael Andretti (both of Andretti Green) along with Scott Dixon (Ganassi) got in based on points. Robbie Buhl (Dreyer & Reinbold) and Tomas Scheckter (Ganassi) earned the final two spots during the last-chance qualifying session.

The bracket was determined by a blind draw. Four teams received byes for the first round. During the quarterfinal matches, Michael Andretti suffered a throttle problem, and forfeited, allowing Buddy Rice to win the heat without posting a time. Sam Hornish Jr. was penalized 5 seconds for a loose lug nut, but Al Unser Jr. still would have won the heat anyway. The finals pitted Penske (Hélio Castroneves) versus Red Bull Cheever Racing (Buddy Rice). The crew of Rice won, the first victory in the event for Cheever, and first of back-to-back wins individually for Rice.

First Round
52	Buddy Rice (Cheever Racing)	9.9075
24	Robbie Buhl (Dreyer & Reinbold)	10.3599
31	Al Unser Jr. (Kelley Racing)	9.2636
9	Scott Dixon (Chip Ganassi Racing)	10.1317
15	Kenny Bräck (Team Rahal)	9.8247
8	Scott Sharp (Kelley Racing)	11.4298
10	Tomas Scheckter (Chip Ganassi Racing)	10.2038
21	Felipe Giaffone (Mo Nunn Racing)	10.6056

Quarterfinals
52	Buddy Rice (Cheever Racing)	N/A
26	Michael Andretti (Andretti Green)	forfeit
31	Al Unser Jr. (Kelley Racing)	8.8858
4	Sam Hornish Jr. (Panther Racing)	15.1301
3	Hélio Castroneves (Team Penske)	8.6893
15	Kenny Bräck (Team Rahal)	10.4043
7	Tony Kanaan (Andretti Green)	9.7886
10	Tomas Scheckter (Chip Ganassi Racing)	10.1070

Semifinals
52	Buddy Rice (Cheever Racing)	8.9962
31	Al Unser Jr. (Kelley Racing)	9.4110
3	Hélio Castroneves (Team Penske)	9.3280
11	Tony Kanaan (Andretti Green)	12.6693

Finals
52	Buddy Rice (Cheever Racing)	8.8401
3	Hélio Castroneves (Team Penske)	9.1341

== Starting grid ==
Row	Inside		Middle		Outside	
1	3	(Brazil) Hélio Castroneves (W)	11	(Brazil) Tony Kanaan	27	(United States) Robby Gordon
2	9	(New Zealand) Scott Dixon (R)	26	(United Kingdom) Dan Wheldon (R)	15	(Sweden) Kenny Bräck (W)
3	12	(Japan) Tora Takagi (R)	32	(United States) Tony Renna (R)	8	(United States) Scott Sharp
4	6	(Brazil) Gil de Ferran	55	(United States) Roger Yasukawa (R)	10	(South Africa) Tomas Scheckter
5	7	(United States) Michael Andretti	13	(United States) Greg Ray	54	(Japan) Shinji Nakano (R)
6	21	(Brazil) Felipe Giaffone	31	(United States) Al Unser Jr. (W)	4	(United States) Sam Hornish Jr.
7	52	(United States) Buddy Rice (R)	2	(United States) Jaques Lazier	91	(United States) Buddy Lazier (W)
8	24	(United States) Robbie Buhl	14	(United States) A. J. Foyt IV (R)	23	(United States) Sarah Fisher
9	20	(United States) Alex Barron	22	(Brazil) Vítor Meira (R)	19	(United States) Jimmy Vasser
10	99	(United States) Richie Hearn	98	(United States) Billy Boat	5	(Japan) Shigeaki Hattori
11	44	(United States) Robby McGehee	18	(United States) Jimmy Kite	41	(Brazil) Airton Daré

=== Failed to qualify ===
- (United States) Scott Mayer (R) (#18) – Failed rookie orientation (replaced by Jimmy Kite)
- (Netherlands) Arie Luyendyk (W) (#20) – Injured in practice crash (replaced by Alex Barron)

== Race summary ==
=== Start ===
The controversy of filling the field the previous weekend fizzled as race day arrived. Mari Hulman George gave the command to start engines at 10:47 a.m. EST, and all 33 cars pulled away from the starting grid. It would be the final time that the race would begin at the traditional 11 a.m. EST start time.

Polesitter Hélio Castroneves took the lead at the start, and led for the first 16 laps. The first yellow came out on lap 9 when Billy Boat stalled in turn two. After the restart on lap 15, Sarah Fisher spun in turn three, hitting the outside wall. After pit stops, Scott Dixon took the lead on lap 17.

=== First half ===
Michael Andretti led 28 laps in the first half, but during a pit stop on lap 98, the car quit with the broken throttle linkage.

On lap 61, Richie Hearn got up in the "marbles" in turn two, hitting the outside wall. Jaques Lazier spun to avoid the crash and came to rest on the inside of the track. Both drivers were uninjured.

The lead changed several times in the first half, with Tomas Scheckter, Tony Kanaan, and Jimmy Vasser each taking turns in the lead. Hélio Castroneves and Gil de Ferran were running in the top 5 most of the way.

=== Second half ===
Tomas Scheckter led from laps 101–128, with Hélio Castroneves close behind in second. On lap 127, Airton Dare crashed in turn 2, bringing out the caution, and the leaders all made pit stops. Castroneves beat Scheckter out of the pits and took the lead. Gil de Ferran was in third. On lap 135 restart, de Ferran passed Scheckter for second place.

At lap 150, Penske teammates Castroneves and de Ferran were still running 1st–2nd. Castroneves was looking to put himself in position to win his third "500" in a row. The leaders made their final pit stops on laps 165–168. After the sequence of green flag stops, Castroneves and de Ferran were again running 1st–2nd.

On lap 169, leader Castroneves was hung up behind the lapped car of A. J. Foyt IV down the backstretch. While it was not captured by TV cameras, earlier in the race Foyt had come down and made contact with Castroneves while being lapped in turn 2. This perhaps led to Castroneves following Foyt through the 2nd turn allowing de Ferran to make the pass for the lead going into turn 3.

On lap 172, Robby Gordon stopped on the track with a broken gearbox. The yellow came out, but none of the leaders pitted. Gordon immediately departed the grounds, and flew to Charlotte for the Coca-Cola 600.

With 25 laps to go, the green came back out with de Ferran leading, and Castroneves in second.

=== Finish ===
On lap 182, Scott Sharp brushed the wall in turn 4, then crashed in turn 1. After the cleanup, the green came back out on lap 186. One lap later, however, Dan Wheldon spun in turn three, hit the outside wall, then the car flipped over and landed upside-down. Wheldon was not injured.

During the caution for the Wheldon crash, Scott Dixon, who was running in the top ten, was weaving back and forth on the mainstretch to warm up his tires. He began to do it too vigorously, and brushed the inside wall. The car was too damaged to continue.

The green came out with six laps to go. Gil de Ferran held off Hélio Castroneves by 0.2290 seconds to win his first Indianapolis 500. After the race, Castroneves coaxed de Ferran to climb the catch fence on the mainstretch, mimicking his own traditional post-race victory celebration. de Ferran ended up retiring at season's end, becoming the fourth Indy 500 winner to retire as a reigning "500" champion.

The "curse of the Indy three-peat" prevailed again as Castroneves failed to achieve victory. His three-race career record of 1st–1st–2nd, however, established an Indy record for a driver's first three starts. Castroneves' second place tied Al Unser's 1970–1971–1972 effort of 1st–1st–2nd.

== Box score ==
Finish	Start	No	Name	Qual	Chassis	Engine	Laps	Status	Entrant
1	10	6	(Brazil) Gil de Ferran	228.633	Panoz G-Force	Toyota	200	156.291 mph	Team Penske
2	1	3	(Brazil) Hélio Castroneves W	231.725	Dallara IR-03	Toyota	200	+0.2990	Team Penske
3	2	11	(Brazil) Tony Kanaan	231.006	Dallara IR-03	Honda	200	+1.2475	Andretti Green Racing
4	12	10	(South Africa) Tomas Scheckter	227.768	Panoz G-Force	Toyota	200	+1.6845	Chip Ganassi Racing
5	7	12	(Japan) Tora Takagi R	229.358	Panoz G-Force	Toyota	200	+1.9606	Mo Nunn Racing
6	25	20	(United States) Alex Barron	227.274	Panoz G-Force	Toyota	200	+6.0037	Mo Nunn Racing
7	8	32	(United States) Tony Renna R	228.765	Dallara IR-03	Toyota	200	+7.4882	Kelley Racing
8	14	13	(United States) Greg Ray	227.288	Panoz G-Force	Honda	200	+11.5666	Access Motorsports
9	17	31	(United States) Al Unser Jr. W	226.285	Dallara IR-03	Toyota	200	+17.4161	Kelley Racing
10	11	55	(United States) Roger Yasukawa R	228.577	Dallara IR-03	Honda	199	-1 Lap	Super Aguri Fernandez Racing
11	19	52	(United States) Buddy Rice R	226.213	Dallara IR-03	Chevrolet	199	-1 Lap	Team Cheever
12	26	22	(Brazil) Vítor Meira R	227.158	Dallara IR-03	Chevrolet	199	-1 Lap	Team Menard
13	32	18	(United States) Jimmy Kite	224.195	Dallara IR-03	Chevrolet	197	-3 Laps	PDM Racing
14	15	54	(Japan) Shinji Nakano R	227.222	Dallara IR-03	Honda	196	-4 Laps	Beck Motorsports
15	18	4	(United States) Sam Hornish Jr.	226.225	Dallara IR-03	Chevrolet	195	Engine	Panther Racing
16	6	15	(Sweden) Kenny Bräck W	229.509	Dallara IR-03	Honda	195	-5 Laps	Team Rahal
17	4	9	(New Zealand) Scott Dixon R	230.099	Panoz G-Force	Toyota	191	Accident	Chip Ganassi Racing
18	23	14	(United States) A. J. Foyt IV R	224.177	Dallara IR-03	Toyota	189	Running	A. J. Foyt Enterprises
19	5	26	(United Kingdom) Dan Wheldon R	229.958	Dallara IR-03	Honda	186	Accident	Andretti Green Racing
20	9	8	(United States) Scott Sharp	228.756	Dallara IR-03	Toyota	181	Accident	Kelley Racing
21	21	91	(United States) Buddy Lazier W	224.910	Dallara IR-03	Chevrolet	171	Engine	Hemelgarn Racing
22	3	27	(United States) Robby Gordon	230.205	Dallara IR-03	Honda	169	Gearbox	Andretti Green Racing
23	22	24	(United States) Robbie Buhl	224.369	Dallara IR-03	Chevrolet	147	Engine	Dreyer & Reinbold Racing
24	33	41	(Brazil) Airton Daré	223.609	Panoz G-Force	Toyota	125	Accident	A. J. Foyt Enterprises
25	31	44	(United States) Robby McGehee	224.493	Dallara IR-03	Chevrolet	125	Steering	Panther Racing
26	27	19	(United States) Jimmy Vasser	226.872	Dallara IR-03	Honda	102	Gearbox	Team Rahal
27	13	7	(United States) Michael Andretti	227.739	Dallara IR-03	Honda	94	Throttle Linkage	Andretti Green Racing
28	28	99	(United States) Richie Hearn	225.864	Panoz G-Force	Toyota	61	Accident	Sam Schmidt Motorsports
29	20	2	(United States) Jaques Lazier	225.975	Dallara IR-03	Chevrolet	61	Accident	Team Menard
30	30	5	(Japan) Shigeaki Hattori	224.589	Dallara IR-03	Toyota	19	Fuel System	A. J. Foyt Enterprises
31	24	23	(United States) Sarah Fisher	224.170	Dallara IR-03	Chevrolet	14	Engine	Dreyer & Reinbold Racing
32	29	98	(United States) Billy Boat	225.598	Dallara IR-03	Chevrolet	7	Engine	Panther Racing
33	16	21	(Brazil) Felipe Giaffone	227.210	Panoz G-Force	Toyota	6	Electrical	Mo Nunn Racing

W Former Indianapolis 500 winner

R Indianapolis 500 Rookie

All entrants utilized Firestone tires.

=== Race statistics ===
Lap Leaders
Laps	Leader
1–16	Hélio Castroneves
17–31	Scott Dixon
32–49	Michael Andretti
50	Tony Kanaan
51–57	Tomas Scheckter
58–67	Michael Andretti
68–94	Tomas Scheckter
95–99	Hélio Castroneves
100	Jimmy Vasser
101–128	Tomas Scheckter
129–165	Hélio Castroneves
166	Tomas Scheckter
167	Tony Kanaan
168–169	Tora Takagi
170–200	Gil de Ferran

Total laps led
Driver	Laps
Tomas Scheckter	63
Hélio Castroneves	58
Gil de Ferran	31
Michael Andretti	28
Scott Dixon	15
Tony Kanaan	2
Tora Takagi	1
Jimmy Vasser	1

Cautions: 9 for 49 laps
Laps	Reason
9–13	Billy Boat blown engine
16–21	Sarah Fisher crash in turn 3
53–60	Robbie Buhl spin at pit exit
62–65	Richie Hearn, Jaques Lazier crash in turn 2
104–108	Jimmy Vasser smoking on backstretch
127–133	Airton Daré crash in turn 2
172–174	Robby Gordon stalled on track
182–185	Scott Sharp crash in turn 1
187–193	Dan Wheldon crash in turn 4

== Broadcasting ==
=== Radio ===
The race was carried live on the Indy Racing Radio Network. Mike King served as chief announcer. The booth crew had a new look for 2003. Longtime driver expert Johnny Rutherford left the crew to take over the position of pace car driver during caution periods. Joining King in the booth were two newcomers, Dave Wilson who served as color commentator, and new "driver expert" Davey Hamilton. Hamilton was on a hiatus from driving after his serious crash at Texas in 2001. The broadcast was heard on 555 affiliates.

The 2003 race saw all four turn reporters return to their assigned posts from the previous year. The three pit reporters remained the same, although they swapped their locations along pit road. The 2003 race would be the final 500 on the radio for longtime members Howdy Bell and Chuck Marlowe. Bell once again had the limited role of reporting from the track hospital, while Marlowe covered the garage area as he had since 1989.

Sponsor guests interviewed in the booth included Tim Manganello (BorgWarner), Keith Sirios (Checkers and Rally's), and Chevrolet pace car driver Herb Fishel. Other guests interviewed in the pits included Jim Campbell (Chevrolet) and Wynonna Judd.

Indy Racing Radio Network
Booth Announcers	Turn Reporters	Pit/garage reporters
Chief Announcer: Mike King; Driver expert: Davey Hamilton; Color commentator: Dave Wilson; Historian: Donald Davidson; Commentary: Chris Economaki	Turn 1: Jerry Baker; Turn 2: Kevin Lee; Turn 3: Mark Jaynes; Turn 4: Chris Denari	Jim Murphy (north pits); Kim Morris (center pits); Adam Alexander (south pits)
Chief Announcer: Mike King; Driver expert: Davey Hamilton; Color commentator: Dave Wilson; Historian: Donald Davidson; Commentary: Chris Economaki	Turn 1: Jerry Baker; Turn 2: Kevin Lee; Turn 3: Mark Jaynes; Turn 4: Chris Denari	Chuck Marlowe (garages); Howdy Bell (hospital)

=== Television ===
The race was carried live flag-to-flag coverage in the United States on ABC Sports. The on-air crew remained the same from the previous year, with Bob Jenkins returning as host, and Paul Page handling the play-by-play duties. It would ultimately be the final 500 on television for Bob Jenkins.

For the first time, the race broadcast featured a presenting sponsor. The race was billed as the "Indianapolis 500 Presented by 7-Eleven". The crew called the race for the final time from the booth on top of the Paddock grandstand, for starting in 2004, they would move to the newer television studio inside the Pagoda.

ABC Television
Booth Announcers	Pit/garage reporters
Host: Bob Jenkins; Announcer: Paul Page; Color: Scott Goodyear	Jack Arute; Vince Welch; Dr. Jerry Punch; Gary Gerould

=== Controversy ===
On Sunday May 18, the final day of time trials, when there was some question of whether the field would be filled to the traditional 33 cars, television reporters Bob Jenkins and Jack Arute passionately defended the event from its detractors on air. Afterwards, Jenkins received criticism, mostly for a lack of journalistic professionalism and objectivity. His statements were considered biased in favor of the IRL/IMS, and that he allowed his personal opinions enter his reporting.

During ABC coverage of time trials, Vítor Meira filled the field to 33 cars. Arute opened his interview with Meira at 5:17 p.m. EDT by stating:

And to all the naysayers who predicted that there would NOT be 33 cars in the field of this year's Indy 500, allow me to introduce you to Vítor Meira.

A minute later, Jenkins replied with:

The naysayers have been proven wrong, there is a 33-car field set for the 500.

As the day was coming to a close, the television coverage switched to ESPN for the final hour. Jenkins closed the broadcast with the following commentary at 6:56 p.m. EDT:

I want to again say how disappointed I am in some of the journalists in this city and in other cities who have questioned the 33-car starting lineup this year. I think they forgot one thing. And this is really what they've been trying to put down all this time. This is the Indianapolis 500. It was 50 years ago, it is today, and it will be next year and in years to come.

A minute later, Arute followed:

I want to echo what Bob Jenkins said. From the beginning of the month of May here at Indianapolis, misguided people have said that this race wasn't going to have a field of 33. Hello! Not only are the field of 33 full but it's also going to be the most competitive Indy 500 in most recent memory. I want to go back to the thoughts of one Jim Mora (local NFL coach) who once said to misguided media, ya think ya know, but ya just don't know.

Jenkins was released from ABC/ESPN at the end of the 2003 season. After a very brief stint covering CART on Spike TV in 2004, and after a single race at ESPN in 2008, he joined Versus (now known as the NBC Sports Network) in 2009. It was never announced if the on-air comments were a factor in his release, and Jenkins contends he was never informed if that was the case. Following the 2012 season, Jenkins reduced his schedule to a reserve role that includes Carb Day coverage.

== Notes ==
=== Works cited ===
- 2003 Indianapolis 500 Daily Trackside Report for the Media
- Indianapolis 500 History: Race & All-Time Stats – Official Site

2002 Indianapolis 500; Hélio Castroneves	2003 Indianapolis 500; Gil de Ferran	2004 Indianapolis 500; Buddy Rice
