= 2004 Indianapolis 500 =

American motor race

88th Indianapolis 500

Indianapolis Motor Speedway

Indianapolis 500
- Sanctioning body: Indy Racing League
- Season: 2004 IndyCar season
- Date: May 30, 2004
- Winner: (United States) Buddy Rice (450 miles due to rain)
- Winning team: Rahal Letterman Racing
- Winning Chief Mechanic: Ricardo Nault
- Time of race: 3:14:55.2395
- Average speed: 138.518 mph
- Pole position: (United States) Buddy Rice
- Pole speed: 222.024 mph
- Fastest qualifier: (United States) Buddy Rice
- Rookie of the Year: (Japan) Kosuke Matsuura
- Most laps led: (United States) Buddy Rice (91)

Pre-race ceremonies
- National anthem: Jessica Simpson
- "Back Home Again in Indiana": Jim Nabors
- Starting command: Mari Hulman George
- Pace car: Chevrolet Corvette
- Pace car driver: Morgan Freeman
- Starter: Bryan Howard
- Honorary starter: Nick Lachey
- Estimated attendance: 300,000 (estimated)

Television in the United States
- Network: ABC
- Announcers: Paul Page, Scott Goodyear, Jack Arute
- Nielsen ratings: 4.7 / 11

Chronology
Previous	Next
2003	2005

The 88th Indianapolis 500 was held at the Indianapolis Motor Speedway in Speedway, Indiana, on Sunday, May 30, 2004. It was part of the 2004 IndyCar Series season and the ninth Indy 500 sanctioned by the Indy Racing League. Buddy Rice qualified for the pole position, captured the pit stop contest, led the most laps, and won the race for team owners Bobby Rahal and David Letterman.

The race began two hours behind schedule due to a morning rain delay. After 27 laps had been completed, rain began to fall again and threatened to wash out the rest of the day. About two hours later, the rain had ceased, and the track was dry. The race resumed on lap 28 and cruised beyond the halfway point to make the race official. At the 150-lap mark, the race had been very competitive up to that point, but was destined to come down to the final round of pit stops to decide the winner. Moreover, dark skies were looming, and inclement weather was moving back into the area. As the race passed the 400-mile mark (lap 160) it was turning into a weather battle. Some leaders headed for the pits to make their final pit stops. At the same time, a handful of teams gambled by staying out, hoping to stretch their fuel and lead the race when the approaching rain arrived.

Despite desperate attempts to prevail over the approaching rainstorm, all leaders ultimately were forced to cycle through their final round of pit stops. Nobody was able to stretch their fuel long enough to beat the rain. Buddy Rice, who had led the most laps thus far, re-emerged as the leader on lap 172. The race was ended after 450 miles (180 laps), just 50 miles (20 laps) short of the scheduled distance. A severe thunderstorm, which eventually produced an F2 tornado, formed in the speedway area, shutting the track down and sending the spectators and competitors for cover. Buddy Rice was declared the winner, his first victory in championship-level competition.

Honda, which had first arrived at Indianapolis in 1994, scored its long-anticipated first Indy 500 victory. It was also the fourth and final Indy victory for the Panoz G-Force chassis.

== Race background ==
Rule changes were implemented before the start of the season, which reduced engine displacement from 3.5 L down to 3.0 L. In addition, the on-board fuel capacity was reduced from 35 gallons down to 30. The changes were made to curtail speeds, which had crept up into the low 230 mph range in 2003, and in the wake of Chip Ganassi Racing No. 10 driver Tony Renna dying on October 22, 2003, the second day of a Firestone off-season tire test. On a cool 50 degree morning, Renna spun in turn three, became airborne, and crashed into the outside wall and catch fence. The car was heavily damaged, and Renna died of massive internal trauma. Furthermore, the series imposed a minimum ambient and track surface temperature requirement.

For the first time, single-point refueling rigs were allowed. During pit stops, teams could utilize a single combined fuel/vent hose assembly. This eliminated the need for a separate and dedicated vent hose operator, improving safety.

== Race schedule ==
Race schedule — April/May 2004
Sun	Mon	Tue	Wed	Thu	Fri	Sat
25	26; ROP	27	28; Open test	29; Open test	30	1
2	3	4	5	6	7	8 Mini-Marathon
9 Practice	10; Practice	11; Practice	12; Practice	13; Practice	14; Practice	15; Pole Day
16; Time Trials	17	18	19; Practice	20; Practice	21; Practice	22; Practice
23; Bump Day	24	25	26	27; Carb Day	28	29; Parade
30; Indy 500	31; Memorial Day					

Color	Notes
Green	Practice
Dark Blue	Time trials
Silver	Race day
Red	Rained out*
Blank	No track activity

* Includes days where track activity
was significantly limited due to rain

ROP — denotes Rookie Orientation Program

== Practice ==
=== Rookie Orientation ===
Rookie orientation was held April 26, with seven drivers participating. Newcomers Ed Carpenter, Kosuke Matsuura, Mark Taylor, and Luis Díaz passed all four phases of the rookie tests. Jeff Simmons and Marty Roth passed three phases, and can pass the fourth phase during routine practice.

Larry Foyt participated, but due to his previous high-speed oval experience, was exempted from needing to pass the four-phase test.

Carpenter led the speed chart at 215.584 mph. Though Díaz passed the rookie test, he did not return with Ganassi for practice come May.

=== Sunday, May 9 – Opening Day ===
Scott Dixon led the speed chart with a lap of 219.760 mph on opening day. No incidents were reported.

=== Monday, May 10 ===
Track remained closed most of the afternoon, due to thunderstorms. The track re-opened just before 5 p.m., and Hélio Castroneves set the fastest lap of the month at 220.300 mph. Late in the day, Robby Gordon spun and hit the outside wall in turn 2 but was uninjured.

=== Tuesday. May 11 ===
Felipe Giaffone brushed the wall in the north chute, then slid along the wall to the entrance to the pits. He was uninjured. Adrián Fernández became the first driver of the month to break the 221 mph barrier, but Kosuke Matsuura (221.857 mph) ended up with the fastest lap of the day.

=== Wednesday, May 12 ===
Tony Kanaan drove the fastest lap of the month, at 222.668 mph.

=== Thursday, May 13 ===
Rain kept the track closed until 3 p.m. The session ended about 10 minutes early when Scott Sharp crashed in turn 1. Hélio Castroneves turned the fastest lap of the day (221.156 mph). Buddy Rice was among the top five for the first time all week.

=== Friday, May 14 – Fast Friday ===
The track opened at 11 a.m. but lasted only four minutes, as rain began falling and closed the track for the day. During the brief session, only four cars had entered the track, with Sarah Fisher (212.616 mph) the only car to run a single lap at speed.

== Time trials ==
=== Saturday, May 15 – Pole Day ===
Pole day dawned cool and damp. Overnight rain kept the track closed until shortly after noon. During the first practice session, Tony Kanaan reached 223.224 mph, the fastest lap of the month.

Pole qualifying began at 2:15 p.m. Roger Yasukawa earned the distinction as the first driver in the field. Shortly after, Robby Gordon qualified his car and immediately boarded a plane to Richmond to participate in the evening NASCAR event. At 3:06 p.m., Dan Wheldon placed himself on the provisional pole position after a qualifying run of 221.524 mph. Several wave-offs and two wrecks (Bryan Herta and Felipe Giaffone) characterized the early attempts.

At 4:14 p.m., Buddy Rice took over the pole position with a run of 222.024 mph. Rice held off late runs by Dario Franchitti and Tony Kanaan to secure his first Indy 500 pole. The field was filled with 22 cars at the end of the day.

=== Sunday, May 16 – Second Day ===
Four cars completed attempts to fill the field to 26 cars. After wrecking the day before, Bryan Herta and Felipe Giaffone put their cars safely in the field. Herta was the fastest qualifier of the afternoon.

The track was then closed for two days. Practice continued on Wednesday through Saturday. Mark Taylor brushed the wall on Wednesday but suffered only minor damage. On Thursday, A. J. Foyt IV spun in turn 3, brushed the inside wall, and suffered minor damage. Buddy Lazier joined Dreyer & Reinbold Racing on Friday to drive the #24 car (which later became #91 in a joint entry with Hemelgarn). On his first day of track activity, Lazier led non-qualified cars at 215.513 mph. The final full day of practice was held on Saturday, May 22. P. J. Jones took to the track for the first time but only managed 208 mph.

=== Sunday, May 23 – Bump Day ===
On the final day of qualifying, seven positions were opened in the field. P. J. Jones was the first car to qualify (213.355 mph), followed by Marty Roth and others. At 1:45 p.m., Greg Ray filled the field to 33 cars with a run of 216.641 mph, the fastest attempt of the afternoon.

A brief rain shower followed, with Robby McGehee sitting on the bubble as the slowest qualifier (211.631 mph). At that point, it did not appear that any additional drivers would attempt to qualify. The only driver left on the sidelines was Jaques Lazier, who briefly practiced during the week for Foyt. However, the ride fizzled. Nevertheless, the track was reopened after the shower as track crews were able to dry the circuit.

During the afternoon, Tony Stewart visited the track. He was running full-time in NASCAR and had raced in the NEXTEL All-Star Challenge the night prior. A. J. Foyt reportedly called Stewart at the track and invited him to practice in one of his backup cars. Stewart quickly passed his physical and went to the pit area to prepare for a possible qualifying attempt. With little else going on during the afternoon, the rumors promptly buzzed around the track and throngs of media surrounded Stewart to cover the breaking story.

With about an hour left in the day, a car was prepared for Stewart and fired up on the pit lane. Stewart had yet to climb into the car but was suited up in his driving uniform. At 5:36 p.m., however, Stewart left the pits on foot and announced he would not attempt to qualify. Stewart's contracts with Joe Gibbs Racing, Home Depot, and Chevrolet precluded him from driving Foyt's Toyota Indy car.

== Carb Day ==
The final practice was held on Thursday, May 27. The session was scheduled for two hours, but rain ended the day about 15 minutes early. Kosuke Matsuura (219.226 mph) was the fastest of the day. No incidents were reported, but P. J. Jones suffered an oil leak, which delayed his appearance on track.

=== Pit Stop Challenge ===
The 28th annual Checkers and Rally's Pit Stop Challenge was held Thursday May 27. Twelve teams competed in a single-elimination bracket. Ten participants were named to the event. On May 19, a last-chance qualifying session was held. Kosuke Matsuura (Fernandez) and Bryan Herta (Andretti Green) filled the final two spots. The bracket was determined by a blind draw.

Four teams received byes for the first round. During the quarterfinal matches, Sam Hornish Jr. was disqualified for stalling the engine and not leaving the pit box under power. In one of the semifinal matchups, Dan Wheldon was issued a 5-second penalty for a missed lug nut, handing the win to Buddy Rice. The finals pitted Penske (Hélio Castroneves) versus Rahal Letterman (Buddy Rice). It was a rematch of drivers from the previous year's final round, though Rice won the 2003 event with Cheever Racing. Rice and Castroneves had won the event the previous two years, respectively. Castroneves ran over his air hose and was subsequently issued a 10-second penalty. Even without the penalty, Rice had a faster time and won the contest for the second year in a row. It was the first of two wins, as of 2024, in the pit stop contest for the Rahal team.

First Round
6	Sam Hornish Jr. (Team Penske)	8.4217
1	Scott Dixon (Chip Ganassi Racing)	9.1235
51	Alex Barron (Cheever Racing)	9.2037
7	Bryan Herta (Andretti Green)	9.4757
3	Hélio Castroneves (Team Penske)	8.4240
5	Kosuke Matsuura (Fernández Racing)	10.6561
11	Tony Kanaan (Andretti Green)	9.1149
8	Scott Sharp (Kelley Racing)	9.3893

Quarterfinals
15	Buddy Rice (Rahal Letterman)	9.3367
6	Sam Hornish Jr. (Team Penske)	no time
26	Dan Wheldon (Andretti Green)	9.4382
51	Alex Barron (Cheever Racing)	9.7288
3	Hélio Castroneves (Team Penske)	10.2376
27	Dario Franchitti (Andretti Green)	10.4043
11	Tony Kanaan (Andretti Green)	8.8354
10	Darren Manning (Chip Ganassi Racing)	9.2884

Semifinals
15	Buddy Rice (Rahal Letterman)	9.7231
26	Dan Wheldon (Andretti Green)	14.5298
3	Hélio Castroneves (Team Penske)	8.2023
11	Tony Kanaan (Andretti Green)	10.5711

Finals
15	Buddy Rice (Rahal Letterman)	12.3365
3	Hélio Castroneves (Team Penske)	24.4300

== Starting grid ==
Row	Inside		Middle		Outside	
1	15	(United States) Buddy Rice	26	(United Kingdom) Dan Wheldon	27	(United Kingdom) Dario Franchitti
2	36	(Brazil) Bruno Junqueira	11	(Brazil) Tony Kanaan	5	(Mexico) Adrian Fernandez
3	17	(Brazil) Vítor Meira	3	(Brazil) Hélio Castroneves (W)	55	(Japan) Kosuke Matsuura (R)
4	4	(South Africa) Tomas Scheckter	6	(United States) Sam Hornish Jr.	16	(United States) Roger Yasukawa
5	1	(New Zealand) Scott Dixon	2	(United Kingdom) Mark Taylor (R)	10	(United Kingdom) Darren Manning (R)
6	52	(United States) Ed Carpenter (R)	20	(United States) Al Unser Jr. (W)	70	(United States) Robby Gordon
7	39	(United States) Sarah Fisher	8	(United States) Scott Sharp	14	(United States) A. J. Foyt IV
8	41	(United States) Larry Foyt (R)	7	(United States) Bryan Herta	51	(United States) Alex Barron
9	24	(Brazil) Felipe Giaffone	12	(Japan) Tora Takagi	13	(United States) Greg Ray
10	91	(United States) Buddy Lazier (W)	21	(United States) Jeff Simmons (R)	33	(United States) Richie Hearn
11	98	(United States) P. J. Jones (R)	25	(Canada) Marty Roth (R)	18	(United States) Robby McGehee

=== Failed to qualify ===
- #10 (Mexico) Luis Díaz (R) — Participated in Rookie Orientation, but not official practice
- #14 (United States) Jaques Lazier — Became relief driver for Robby Gordon
- #14T (United States) Tony Stewart — Passed physical, did not practice

== Race recap ==
=== Start ===
Rain fell early in the morning between 6:00 and 6:20 a.m. Rain resumed at 9:18 a.m. and continued intermittently until about 10:30 a.m. Track drying efforts began, and the race was delayed by a little over two hours. Mari Hulman George gave the traditional command to start engines at 1:02 p.m.

At 1:07 p.m., the field pulled away for the pace laps, roughly two hours behind schedule. At the start, Buddy Rice took the lead from the pole position. Rice led Dario Franchitti, Tony Kanaan, Dan Wheldon, and Hélio Castroneves.

On lap 10, A. J. Foyt IV brushed the wall in turn four, spun and crashed in turn 1. Foyt was uninjured. Several of the leaders were pitted under the caution. Bryan Herta led the field back to green on lap 16. Three laps later, Wheldon took the lead, but on lap 22, rain began to fall again, and the caution was out again. The field circulated under yellow for several laps, on lap 28, the red flag came out. Rain was falling hard, and the cars were parked in the pits. Many believed the resumption would have to be delayed until Monday.

=== Restart ===
The rain stopped, and after a delay of 1 hour and 47 minutes, the track was dry and the race was ready to resume at 3:30pm. Robby Gordon, attempting to race in the Indy 500 and Coca-Cola 600, departed the grounds and flew to Charlotte. Jaques Lazier was standing by and climbed into the car to drive relief. Lazier became the first relief driver at Indy since 1977. During the red flag, Greg Ray's team was penalized for unapproved work on the car. He was sent to the rear of the field for the restart.

Shortly after 3:30 p.m., the green flag came out and the race continued. Dan Wheldon led the field, but Buddy Rice took the lead several laps later. An intense segment of racing saw several changes in position amongst the top ten and the leaders racing closely together. On lap 56, Larry Foyt crashed in turn two. The Foyt team would finish 32nd-33rd.

=== First half ===
Buddy Rice continued to lead during the next stretch of green flag racing. Dan Wheldon and Sam Hornish Jr. ran 2nd-3rd.

The third crash of the day involved Ed Carpenter and Mark Taylor on lap 64.

As the race approached the halfway point, Rice still led and Wheldon and Hornish continued to battle for 2nd and 3rd. The top five were still within seconds of each other.

On lap 94, P. J. Jones made contact with the wall exiting turn 2. Jaques Lazier (driving in relief for Robby Gordon) dropped out with a broken axle. Leader Buddy Rice stalled exiting the pits. Dan Wheldon took over the lead with Hélio Castroneves now second and Rice dropping to 8th.

=== Second half ===
As the race completed the 101st lap, it was scored officially and would not need to carry over into a second day. On lap 105, Darren Manning and Greg Ray got together, crashing in turn four and collecting Sam Hornish Jr.. The three cars slid into the end of the pit wall and came to rest at the pit entrance of the pits. The green came out on lap 114. Tony Kanaan now led with Rice still mired back in 8th place.

Kanaan and Wheldon traded the lead several times over the next several laps. Marty Roth brought out the next caution on lap 131 with a crash in turn four. Buddy Rice worked his way up to 5th place. Most leaders pitted on lap 133, but Bruno Junqueira stayed out and cycled up to the lead. Junqueira was gambling that he could outlast the rest of the field on fuel, and be the winner if rain were to return.

At lap 150, Bruno Junqueira led Buddy Rice and Tony Kanaan. Junqueira's gamble failed, and he headed for the pits on lap 151. Rain was approaching, and all of the leaders would require one final round of pit stops. The approaching and the pit stop strategy threatened to turn the result into a crap shoot.

=== Finish ===
On lap 160, Buddy Rice led Tony Kanaan and Dan Wheldon. Kanaan was the first of the leaders to pit; he ducked into the pits for tires and fuel on lap 164. Wheldon pitted one lap later on lap 165. Two laps later, Rice was in the pits, handing the lead to Bryan Herta. Rain was fast approaching the Speedway, and the race was not expected to reach the full distance before the rain fell. More of the leaders cycled into the pits.

Herta gave up the lead on lap 169 to pit for fuel, that handed the race lead to Adrián Fernández. Slight moisture was reported around the track on lap 170, but not enough to bring out a yellow. Fernandez desperately tried to stretch his fuel but could stay out no longer. Fernandez was forced to pit on lap 171. He made a quick 9-second stop, but lost the lead. After the hectic sequence of pit stops, Buddy Rice was back into the lead.

With Buddy Rice, Tony Kanaan second, and Dan Wheldon third, rain started falling on lap 174. The yellow came out with Rice as the certain winner. A severe thunderstorm moved into the area, and the race was given the checkered flags after the completion of lap 180 (450 miles (720 km)), just twenty laps short of the scheduled distance. Victory Lane was not set up because of weather conditions, with lightning being the issue. The victory celebrations were moved indoors inside the master control tower ("Pagoda"), the first time the race conducted its events away from the circuit, and the grandstands were quickly emptied. Rice became the first American winner since Eddie Cheever in 1998. It was also the first rain-shortened 500 since 1976. Honda, which had first arrived at Indianapolis in 1994, scored its long-anticipated first Indy 500 victory.

An F2 tornado missed the Speedway and its quarter-million spectators by six miles as it raked across the south central portion of Indianapolis. The tornado caused widespread damage. Precipitation for the day in Indianapolis totaled 3.80 inches a record single-day amount for that date, and any date during the month since records had been kept.

== Box score ==
Finish	Start	No	Name	Qual	Chassis	Engine	Laps	Status	Entrant
1	1	15	(United States) Buddy Rice	222.024	Panoz G-Force	Honda	180	138.518 mph	Rahal Letterman Racing
2	5	11	(Brazil) Tony Kanaan	221.200	Dallara	Honda	180	+0.1559	Andretti Green Racing
3	2	26	(United Kingdom) Dan Wheldon	221.524	Dallara	Honda	180	+2.2877	Andretti Green Racing
4	23	7	(United States) Bryan Herta	219.871	Dallara	Honda	180	+2.4497	Andretti Green Racing
5	4	36	(Brazil) Bruno Junqueira	221.379	Panoz G-Force	Honda	180	+3.6786	Newman/Haas Racing
6	7	17	(Brazil) Vítor Meira	220.958	Panoz G-Force	Honda	180	+4.6135	Rahal Letterman Racing
7	6	5	(Mexico) Adrian Fernández	220.999	Panoz G-Force	Honda	180	+5.001	Fernandez Racing
8	13	1	(New Zealand) Scott Dixon	219.319	Panoz G-Force	Toyota	180	+7.3508	Chip Ganassi Racing
9	8	3	(Brazil) Hélio Castroneves W	220.882	Dallara	Toyota	180	+8.8079	Team Penske
10	12	16	(United States) Roger Yasukawa	220.030	Panoz G-Force	Honda	180	+9.2839	Rahal Letterman Racing
11	9	55	(Japan) Kosuke Matsuura R	220.740	Panoz G-Force	Honda	180	+11.1159	Super Aguri Fernandez Racing
12	24	51	(United States) Alex Barron	218.836	Dallara	Chevrolet	180	+16.2722	Team Cheever
13	20	8	(United States) Scott Sharp	215.635	Dallara	Toyota	180	+17.6781	Kelley Racing
14	3	27	(United Kingdom) Dario Franchitti	221.471	Dallara	Honda	180	+18.6483	Andretti Green Racing
15	25	24	(Brazil) Felipe Giaffone	216.259	Dallara	Chevrolet	179	-1 Lap	Dreyer & Reinbold Racing
16	29	21	(United States) Jeff Simmons R	214.783	Dallara	Toyota	179	-1 Lap	Mo Nunn Racing
17	17	20	(United States) Al Unser Jr. W	217.966	Dallara	Chevrolet	179	-1 Lap	Patrick Racing
18	10	4	(South Africa) Tomas Scheckter	220.417	Dallara	Chevrolet	179	-1 Lap	Panther Racing
19	26	12	(Japan) Tora Takagi	214.364	Dallara	Toyota	179	-1 Lap	Mo Nunn Racing
20	30	33	(United States) Richie Hearn	213.715	Panoz G-Force	Toyota	178	-2 Laps	Sam Schmidt Motorsports
21	19	39	(United States) Sarah Fisher	215.771	Dallara	Toyota	177	-3 Laps	Kelley Racing
22	33	18	(United States) Robby McGehee	211.631	Dallara	Chevrolet	177	-3 Laps	PDM Racing
23	28	91	(United States) Buddy Lazier W	215.110	Dallara	Chevrolet	164	Fuel System	Hemelgarn Racing
24	32	25	(Canada) Marty Roth R	211.974	Dallara	Toyota	128	Accident FS	Roth Racing
25	15	10	(United Kingdom) Darren Manning R	219.271	Panoz G-Force	Toyota	104	Accident T4	Chip Ganassi Racing
26	11	6	(United States) Sam Hornish Jr.	220.180	Dallara	Toyota	104	Accident T4	Team Penske
27	27	13	(United States) Greg Ray	216.641	Panoz G-Force	Honda	98	Accident T4	Access Motorsports
28	31	98	(United States) P. J. Jones R	213.355	Dallara	Chevrolet	92	Accident BS	CURB/Agajanian/Beck Motorsports
29	18	70	(United States) Robby Gordon (Jaques Lazier Laps 28–88)	216.522	Dallara	Chevrolet	88	Mechanical	Robby Gordon Motorsports
30	14	2	(United Kingdom) Mark Taylor R	219.282	Dallara	Chevrolet	62	Accident T3	Panther Racing
31	16	52	(United States) Ed Carpenter R	218.590	Dallara	Chevrolet	62	Accident T3	Team Cheever
32	22	41	(United States) Larry Foyt R	213.277	Panoz G-Force	Toyota	54	Accident T2	A. J. Foyt Enterprises
33	21	14	(United States) A. J. Foyt IV	214.256	Dallara	Toyota	26	Handling	A. J. Foyt Enterprises

Note: Relief drivers in parentheses

W Former Indianapolis 500 winner

R Indianapolis 500 Rookie

All entrants utilized Firestone tires.

=== Race statistics ===
Lap Leaders
Laps	Leader
1–12	Buddy Rice
13–15	Alex Barron
16	Bryan Herta
17–33	Dan Wheldon
34–49	Buddy Rice
50–58	Sam Hornish Jr.
59–97	Buddy Rice
98–103	Dan Wheldon
104–116	Tony Kanaan
117–119	Dan Wheldon
120–133	Tony Kanaan
134	Dario Franchitti
135–150	Bruno Junqueira
151	Tony Kanaan
152–166	Buddy Rice
167–168	Bryan Herta
169–171	Adrián Fernández
172–180	Buddy Rice

Total laps led
Driver	Laps
Buddy Rice	91
Tony Kanaan	28
Dan Wheldon	26
Bruno Junqueira	16
Sam Hornish Jr.	9
Alex Barron	3
Adrián Fernández	3
Bryan Herta	2
Dario Franchitti	1

Cautions: 8 for 56 laps
Laps	Reason
11–15	A. J. Foyt IV crash in turn 1
22–29	Rain (red flag)
56–61	Larry Foyt crash in turn 2
63–69	Mark Taylor, Ed Carpenter crash in turn 3
95–102	P. J. Jones crash on backstretch
106–115	Hornish, Manning, Ray crash in turn 4
132–136	Marty Roth crash in turn 4
174–180	Rain (red flag)

== Broadcasting ==
=== Radio ===
The race was carried live on the Indianapolis Motor Speedway Radio Network. Mike King served as chief announcer. Kenny Bräck served as "driver expert" up until the rain delay. Bräck sat out the 2004 IndyCar season due to a major crash suffered at Texas in October 2003. This was the only time, other than 2011, that Bräck served as the driver expert on an American broadcast. However, he would serve in later years on international broadcasts.

Departing from the broadcast team were two longtime members, Howdy Bell and Chuck Marlowe. Donald Davidson celebrated his 40th year on the crew, while Jerry Baker reached his milestone 30th race.

Kevin Lee moved from turn two to the pit area. Adam Alexander moved from the pits to the turn two location. This was Dave Argabright's first year on the network. This was the last year for both Jim Murphy and Kim Morris.

Indy Racing Radio Network
Booth Announcers	Turn Reporters	Pit/garage reporters
Chief Announcer: Mike King; Driver expert: Kenny Bräck; Historian: Donald Davidson; Color analyst: Dave Wilson; Commentary: Chris Economaki	Turn 1: Jerry Baker; Turn 2: Adam Alexander; Turn 3: Mark Jaynes; Turn 4: Chris Denari	Kevin Lee; Kim Morris; Jim Murphy; Dave Argabright

=== Television ===
The race was carried live flag-to-flag coverage in the United States on ABC Sports. The broadcast was billed as the Indianapolis 500 Presented by 7-Eleven. The broadcasting crew moved to a new booth in the Pit Road Suites next to the Pagoda. Several innovations were introduced, including the first 180-degree on-board rotating camera, and a Skycam along the mainstretch. The network celebrated its 40th anniversary, covering the Indianapolis 500.

Bob Jenkins was released from ABC and ESPN after 2003, and his position as "host" was taken by Terry Gannon. Paul Page continued as play-by-play, along with Scott Goodyear. Jack Arute, who had been in the pit area from 1984 to 1998 and 2000 to 2003, moved into the booth as analyst for the 2004 race. Todd Harris and Jamie Little, joined the crew for the first time as pit reporters.

Despite a lengthy rain delay throughout the afternoon, ABC stayed on-air with coverage all day, filling the downtime with highlights and interviews. The marathon broadcast totaled 8 hours and 22 minutes.

The introduction, titled "The Chase", featuring Henry Rollins, would earn a Sports Emmy nomination for outstanding post produced audio/sound.

ABC Television
Booth Announcers	Pit/garage reporters
Host: Terry Gannon; Announcer: Paul Page; Color: Scott Goodyear; Color: Jack Arute	Vince Welch; Dr. Jerry Punch; Gary Gerould; Todd Harris; Jamie Little

== Gallery ==
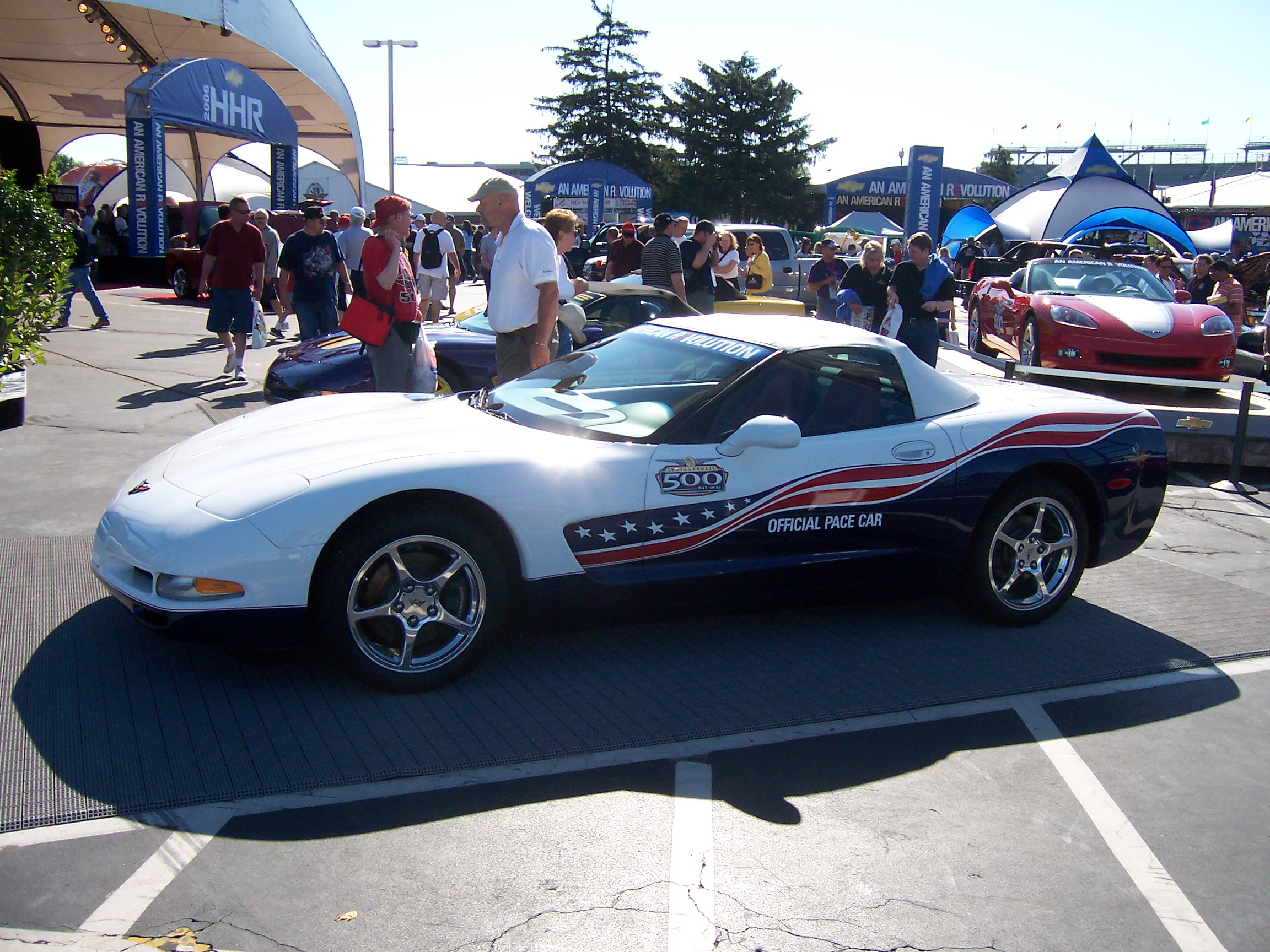
2004 Chevrolet Corvette pace car

== Notes ==
=== Works cited ===
- 2004 Indianapolis 500 Daily Trackside Report for the Media
- Indianapolis 500 History: Race & All-Time Stats - Official Site

2003 Indianapolis 500; Gil de Ferran	2004 Indianapolis 500; Buddy Rice	2005 Indianapolis 500; Dan Wheldon
