= Buddy Rice =

American racing driver (born 1976)

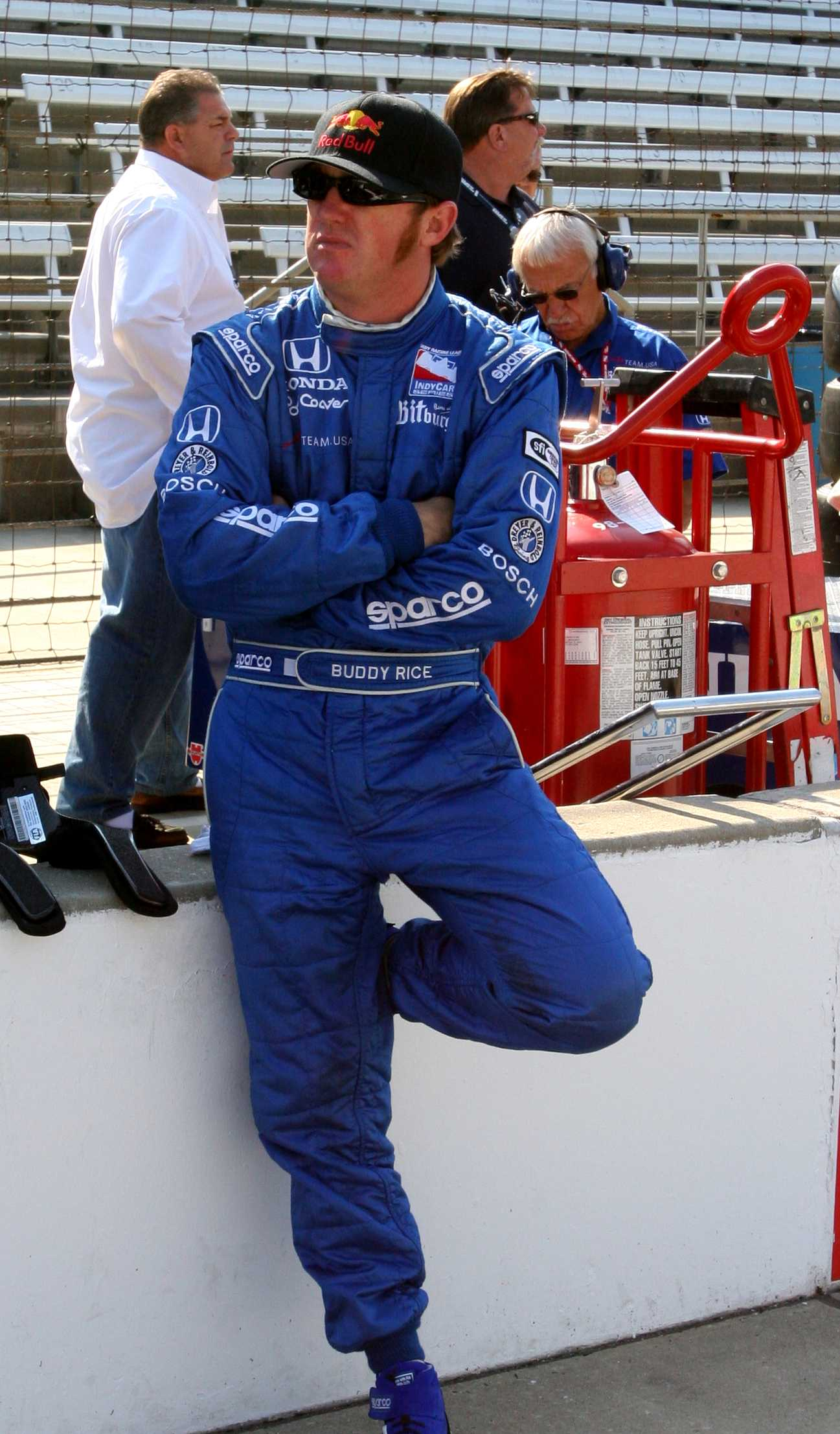
- Rice waits for a qualification attempt before the 2007 Indianapolis 500
- Nationality: (United States) American
- Born: Albert Lee Rice; January 31, 1976 (age 50) Phoenix, Arizona, U.S.

IndyCar Series career
- Debut season: 2002
- Current team: Panther Racing
- Categorisation: FIA Gold (until 2025); FIA Silver (2026–)
- Car number: 44
- Former teams: Cheever Racing; Rahal Letterman Racing; Dreyer & Reinbold Racing; Rubicon Racing Team
- Starts: 99
- Wins: 6
- Poles: 5
- Best finish: 3rd in 2004

Previous series
- 2006 1998–2000, 2002 1996–1997: Champ Car World Series; Toyota Atlantic; U.S. Formula Ford 2000

Championship titles
- 2000 2004 2009: Toyota Atlantic Champion; Indianapolis 500 winner 24 Hours of Daytona winner

Awards
- 1997: Team USA Scholarship

Albert Lee "Buddy" Rice (born January 31, 1976) is an American former professional race car driver. He is best known for winning the 2004 Indianapolis 500 while driving for Rahal Letterman Racing, and the 2009 24 Hours of Daytona for Brumos Racing.

== Career ==
=== Early years ===
Born in Phoenix, Arizona, Rice is the son of a former drag racer. Rice's grandfather was from Indianapolis and passed on his interest in racing to Rice's father. Rice saw his first race when he was six years old. He started racing in go-karts when he was eleven. Rice played baseball in high school in Phoenix, Arizona, and attracted the attention of college and professional scouts. However, both Rice and his father decided he would pursue a career in racing instead.

Rice's professional career began in 1996, when he drove in one U.S. F2000 event; he finished eighth after starting second. He also drove in the Dodge Shelby Pro Series, winning from the pole at Las Vegas, Nevada.

In 1997, Rice drove in F2000 for Lynx Racing/DSTP Motorsports, finishing fourth in points and winning at Phoenix. He also won the 1997 Valvoline Team USA Scholarship, where he represented the United States in Europe's Nations Cup.

In 1998, Rice won from the pole at Nazareth. He finished seventh in Toyota Atlantic points, and won the Gilles Villeneuve Memorial Award. He finished fifth in the Toyota Atlantic championship in 1999, driving for Lynx Racing.

Rice won the 2000 Toyota Atlantic Series championship, which gained the attention of Red Bull Cheever Racing. In 2001, he tested with Red Bull Cheever Racing in November at California.

=== IRL IndyCar Series ===
In August 2002, Rice had his first race in the IRL for Red Bull Cheever Racing at Michigan International Speedway. Hired initially to replace crash-prone Tomas Scheckter, team owner Eddie Cheever discovered that Scheckter's contract was more iron-clad than first thought. Team Cheever then ran three entries (joined by their team owner), and the best crew and parts were given to Rice. Rice lost the race by inches to Scheckter, but made a mark in the series. He competed in the final five races of the IRL IndyCar Series season with Red Bull Cheever Racing, scoring four top-ten finishes and two top-five finishes in five starts.

In 2003, Rice competed in thirteen of sixteen races for Red Bull Cheever Racing but was replaced by the more experienced Alex Barron.

In November 2003, Rice dabbled with a one-off drive in a NASCAR Craftsman Truck Series race at the Homestead circuit before being called by Bobby Rahal to drive the No. 15 Argent Mortgage Honda when Kenny Bräck was injured in a late-race crash at Texas Motor Speedway in 2003.

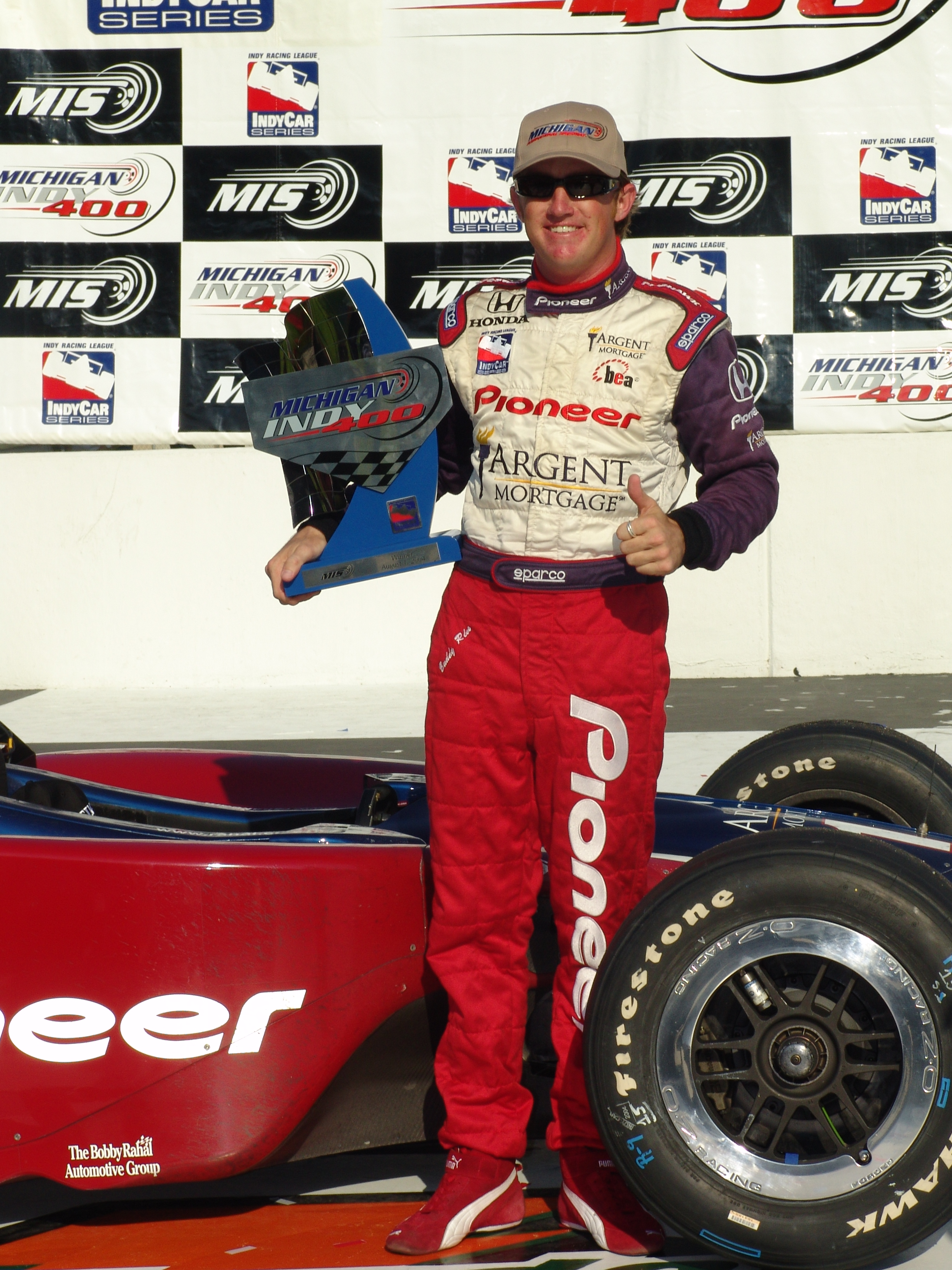
Buddy Rice in 2004 @ Michigan International Speedway, winner of the Michigan Indy 400

In 2004, Rice started on pole and won a rain-shortened Indianapolis 500, his first IndyCar race victory. He finished third in the IRL championship that year, earning five poles, three wins and leading 342 laps. After his Indy 500 win, his sponsors told him that they would buy him any car he wanted, he chose a 1949 Mercury Eight.

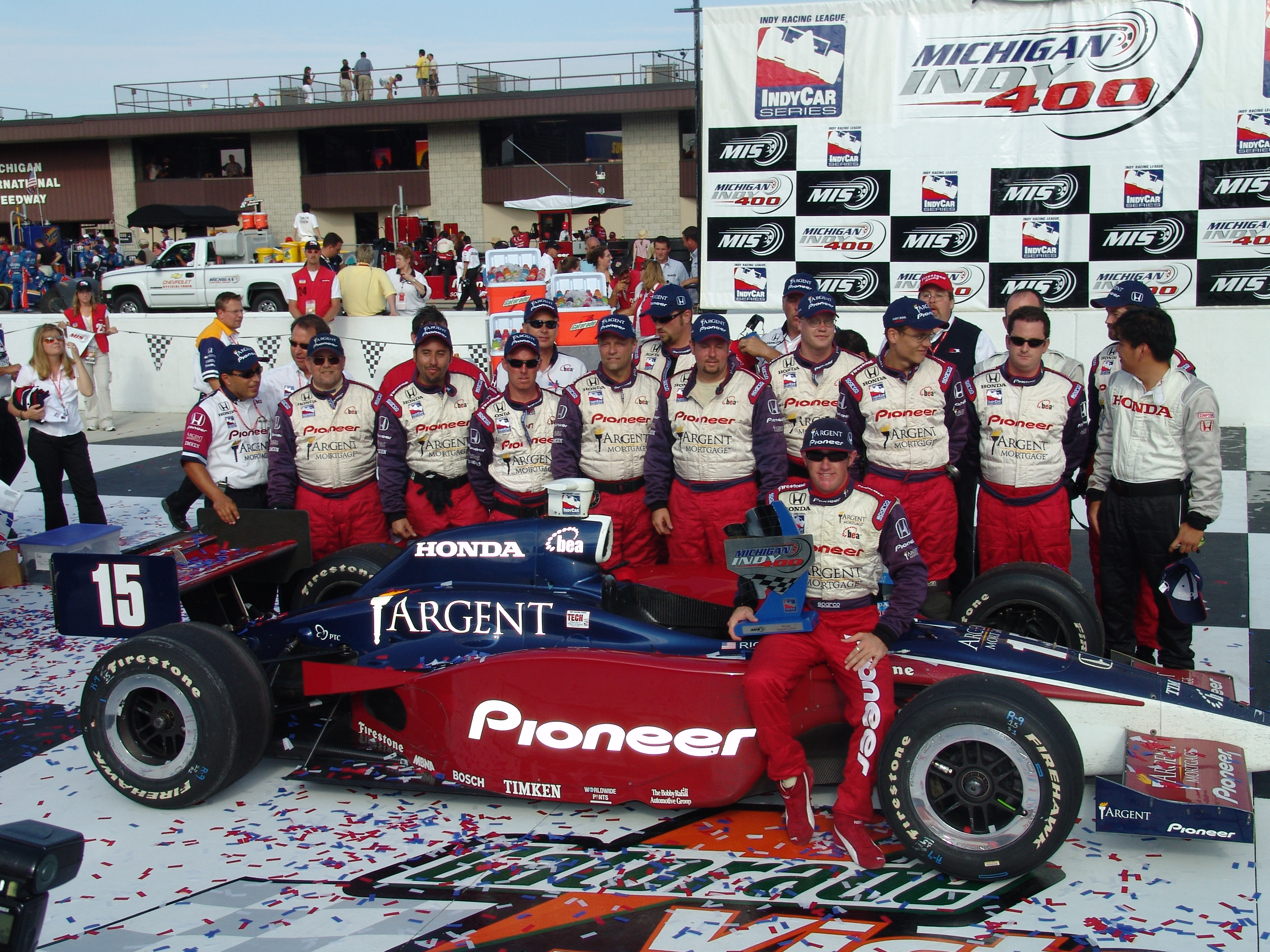
Buddy Rice & Crew in 2004 @ Michigan International Speedway, in winner's circle of the Michigan Indy 400

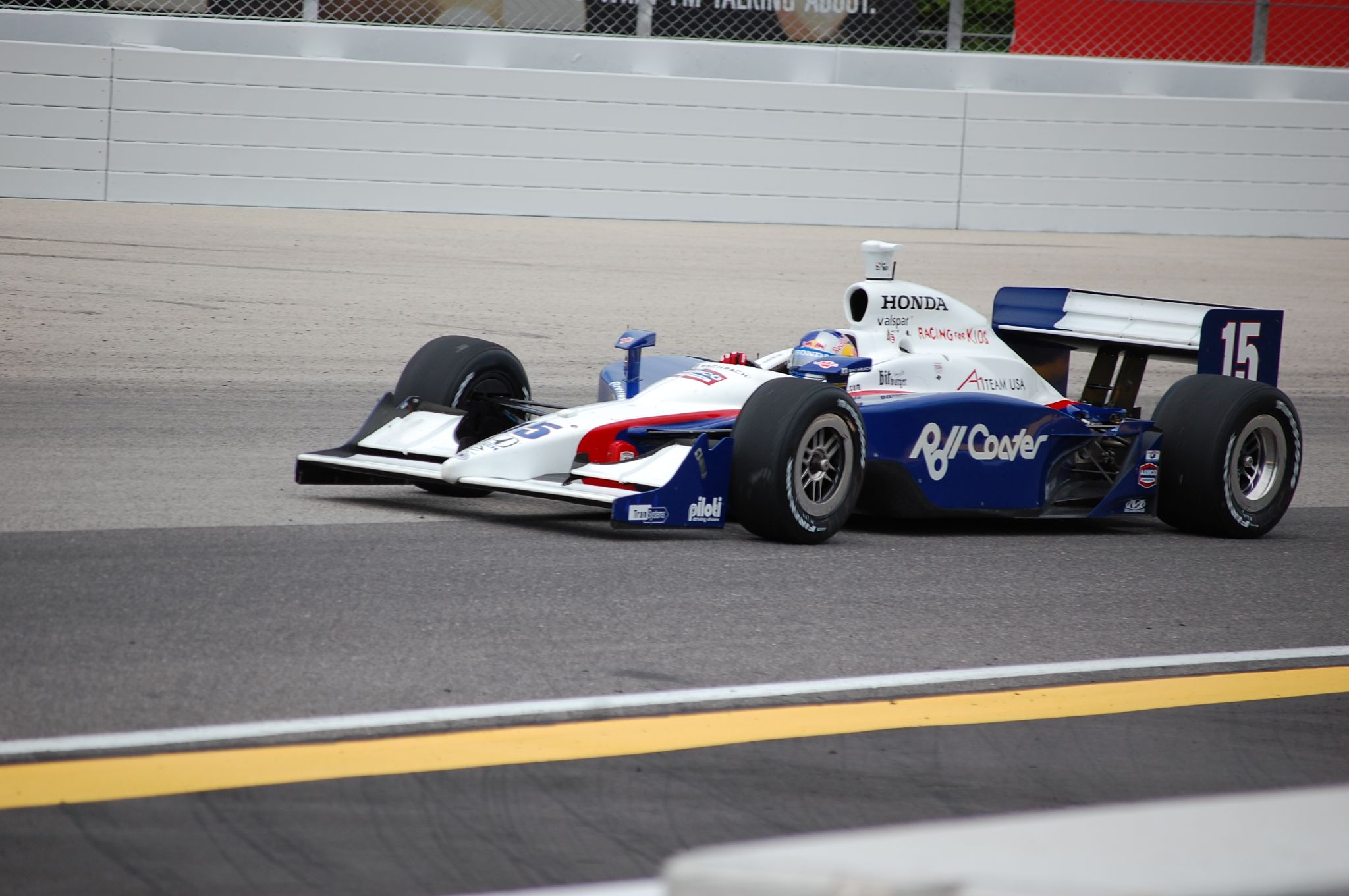
Rice driving at the Milwaukee Mile in 2007

For 2005, Rice and Vítor Meira were joined by Danica Patrick. However, Rice was injured in a crash at Indianapolis during practice, and was not cleared to race. In an ironic twist, Bräck then substituted for Rice.

The 2006 season began tragically for Rice at the season-opening race at Homestead–Miami Speedway when teammate Paul Dana of Rahal Letterman Racing team was killed in the final practice session. Rice and his other teammate Danica Patrick immediately withdrew from the race. Rice started his 2006 season in the following race at St. Petersburg, Florida. His Indianapolis 500 race ended early in a crash with Hélio Castroneves. After the IRL season ended, he raced in the Champ Car World Series race at Autodromo Hermanos Rodriguez for Forsythe Racing and finished tenth.

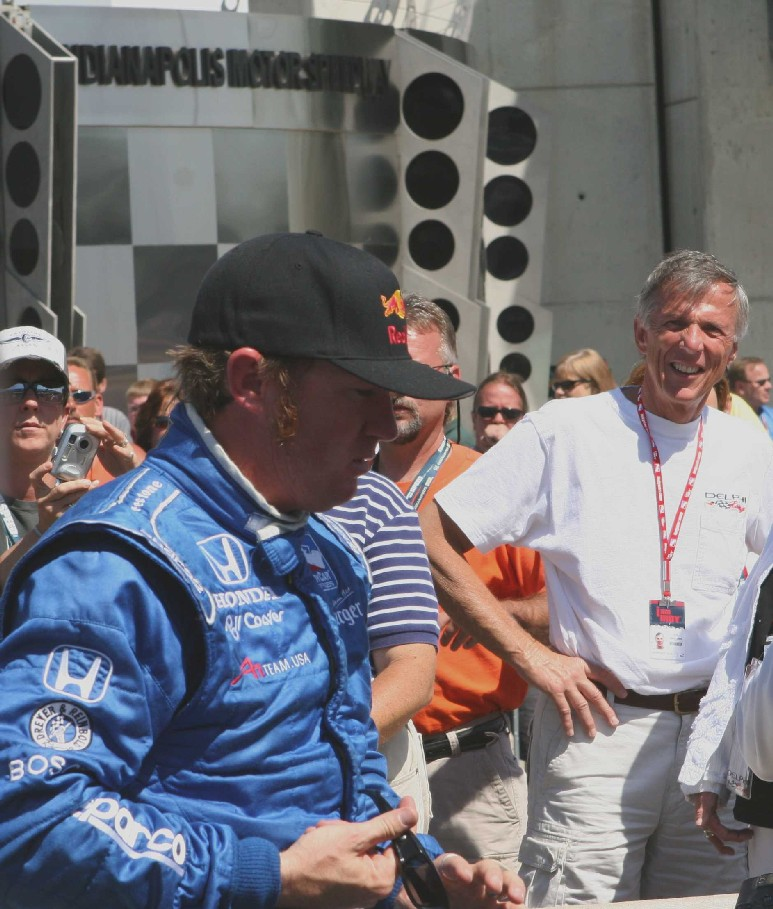
Buddy Rice recovers from a tough qualification attempt prior to the 2007 Indianapolis 500.

For 2007, Rice joined Sarah Fisher at Dreyer & Reinbold Racing. He captured three top-five finishes in the first half of the season and finished ninth in points, his best result since 2004. He was retained by the team for the 2008 IndyCar season, the high point of which came with a fourth-place finish at Watkins Glen. He ultimately finished sixteenth in points.

Rice did not participate in the 2009 IndyCar Series season after being released from Dreyer & Reinbold Racing at the end of the 2008 season. Further, his long-standing partnership with Red Bull also expired and was not renewed.

Rice raced for Panther Racing in the 2011 Indianapolis 500 as a teammate to J. R. Hildebrand driving the No. 44 Honda Dallara.

=== A1 Grand Prix ===
Starting the 2007-08 season, Rice signed to drive for A1 Team USA in the A1 Grand Prix international racing series. He drove in the first two rounds of the season with a best finish of thirteenth in the Zandvoort feature race before ceding the seat to Jonathan Summerton for the remainder of the season.

=== Grand-Am Rolex Sports Car Series ===
Rice competed in a few Grand-Am Rolex Sports Car Series in the early 2000s. In his debut in 2000, he finished second at Watkins Glen on a TRP Lola Nissan. In 2002, he resulted second at the 6 Hours of Watkins Glen and fourth in Homestead and Phoenix, driving a Miracle Riley & Scott Ford.

Rice competed at the 24 Hours of Daytona from 2005 to 2008, with a best result of ninth in 2006. He also raced at Utah from 2006 to 2008, collecting a seventh again in 2006.

In 2009, Rice won the 24 Hours of Daytona on a Brumos Racing Riley Porsche. He spent the second half of the season as teammate of Antonio García in a Spirit of Daytona Coyote Porsche, where he finished fourth at Barber in his only top-ten.

Rice raced full-time for Spirit of Daytona in the 2010 Rolex Sports Car Series, joining again García. He helped Spirit of Daytona get the first podium finish for the team at the Six Hours of the Glen in 2010, collecting a third place. He also resulted fifth in three races and ended the season in eleventh place.

Rice's last Grand-Am race was the 2011 24 Hours of Daytona, where he finished ninth in an Action Express Racing Riley Porsche.

== Personal life ==
In his free time, Rice collects and restores classic cars. He has a child, Mina, who was born on April 9, 2008.

== Motorsports career results ==
=== American open–wheel racing results ===
(key) (Races in bold indicate pole position) (Races in italics indicate fastest lap)

==== USF2000 National Championship ====
Year	Entrant	1	2	3	4	5	6	7	8	9	10	11	12	Pos	Points
1996	???	WDW	STP	PIR; 8	DSC1; 7	MOS	IRP; 18	RIR	WGI1	WGI2	MOH	NHS	LVS; 27	???	???
1997	Lynx Racing	WDW; 2	STP; 3	PIR; 1	**DSC1**; 18	DSC2; 26	SAV; 3	PPI; 2	CHA1; 37	CHA2; 33	MOH; 13	WGI; 11	WGI; 37	**4th**	**153**

==== Atlantic Championship ====
Year	Team	1	2	3	4	5	6	7	8	9	10	11	12	13	Rank	Points
1998	Lynx Racing	**LBH**; 14	**NAZ**; 1	GAT; 4	MIL; 11	MTL; 3	CLE; 3	TOR; 25	TRR; 20	MOH; 2	ROA; 26	VAN; 5	LS; 5	HOU	**7th**	**108**
1999	Lynx Racing	LBH; 4	NAZ; 6	GAT; 6	MIL; 3	MTL; 2	ROA; 2	TRR; 21	MOH; 16	CHI; 5	VAN; 4	LS; 2	**HOU**; 16		**5th**	**113**
2000	DSTP Motorsports	**HMS1**; 2	HMS2; 1	LBH; 1	MIL; 17	MTL; 28	CLE; 1	TOR; 2	**TRR**; 1	ROA; 1	LS; 3	GAT; 2	HOU; 3		**1st**	**185**
2002	DSTP Motorsports	MTY	LBH	MIL	LS; 8	POR; 11	CHI; 11	TOR; 6	CLE; 13	TRR	ROA	MTL	DEN		**17th**	**31**

==== IRL IndyCar Series ====
Year	Team	No.	Chassis	Engine	1	2	3	4	5	6	7	8	9	10	11	12	13	14	15	16	17	18	19	Rank	Points	Ref
2002	Red Bull Cheever	53	Dallara	Infiniti	HMS	PHX	FON	NZR	INDY	TXS	PPIR	RIR	KAN	NSH	MIS; 2	KTY; 12								22nd	140	
2002	Red Bull Cheever	52	Dallara	Infiniti													STL; 4	CHI; 9	TX2; 6					22nd	140	
2003	Cheever Racing	52	Dallara	Chevrolet	HMS; 16	PHX; 9	MOT; 13	INDY; 11	TXS; 14	PPIR; 9	RIR; 9	KAN; 19	NSH; 18	MIS; 11	STL; 14	KTY; 11	NZR; 10	CHI	FON	TX2				16th	229	
2004	Rahal Letterman Racing	15	G-Force	Honda	**HMS**; 7	PHX; 9	MOT; 6	**INDY**; 1	TXS; 15	RIR; 6	**KAN**; 1	**NSH**; 6	MIL; 2	MIS; 1	**KTY**; 2	PPIR; 22	NZR; 4	CHI; 14	FON; 5	TX2; 20				3rd	485	
2005	Rahal Letterman Racing	15	Panoz	Honda	HMS; 19	PHX; 22	STP; 7	MOT; 3	INDY; Inj	TXS; 21	RIR; 11	KAN; 10	NSH; 18	MIL; 17	MIS; 22	KTY; 14	PPIR; 11	SNM; 2	CHI; 13	WGL; 19	FON; 12			15th	295	
2006	Rahal Letterman Racing	15	Panoz	Honda	HMS; Wth^{1}	STP; 13	MOT; 5	INDY; 26	WGL; 4								SNM; 15							15th	234	
2006	Rahal Letterman Racing	15	Dallara	Honda						TXS; 18	RIR; 13	KAN; 17	NSH; 16	MIL; 11	MIS; 13	KTY; 15		CHI; 13						15th	234	
2007	Dreyer & Reinbold Racing	15	Dallara	Honda	HMS; 10	STP; 10	MOT; 10	KAN; 20	INDY; 25	MIL; 18	TXS; 8	IOW; 4	RIR; 5	WGL; 6	NSH; 17	MOH; 8	MIS; 5	KTY; 12	SNM; 11	DET; 7	CHI; 9			9th	360	
2008	Dreyer & Reinbold Racing	15	Dallara	Honda	HMS; 11	STP; 15	MOT^{2} 12	LBH^{2} DNP	KAN; 20	INDY; 8	MIL; 10	TXS; 8	IOW; 22	RIR; 22	WGL; 4	NSH; 7	MOH; 20	EDM; 11	KTY; 10	SNM; 11	DET; 19	CHI; 25	SRF^{3} 10	16th	306	
2011	Panther Racing	44	Dallara	Honda	STP	ALA	LBH	SAO	INDY; 18	TXS1	TXS2	MIL	IOW	TOR	EDM	MOH	NHM	SNM	BAL	MOT	KTY; 9	LVS; C		34th	42	

^{1} Rahal-Letterman Racing withdrew both Rice and teammate Danica Patrick from competition when fellow teammate Paul Dana was killed in a race-morning practice session accident.
^{2} Races run on same day.
^{3} Non-points-paying, exhibition race.

Years	Teams	Races	Poles	Wins	Podiums (Non-win)	Top 10s (Non-podium)	Indianapolis 500 Wins	Championships
8	4	99	5	3	5	35	1 (2004)	0

===== Indianapolis 500 =====
Year	Chassis	Engine	Start	Finish	Team
2003	Dallara	Chevrolet	19	11	Cheever
2004	G-Force	Honda	**1**	**1**	Rahal Letterman
2005	Panoz	Honda	Practice crash		Rahal Letterman
2006	Panoz	Honda	14	26	Rahal Letterman
2007	Dallara	Honda	16	25	Dreyer & Reinbold
2008	Dallara	Honda	17	8	Dreyer & Reinbold
2011	Dallara	Honda	7	18	Panther

==== Champ Car World Series ====
Champ Car results
Year	Team	No.	1	2	3	4	5	6	7	8	9	10	11	12	13	14	Rank	Points	Ref
2006	Forsythe Championship Racing	7	LBH	HOU	MTY	MIL	POR	CLE	TOR	EDM	SJO	DEN	MTL	ROA	SRF	MXC; 10	23rd	11	

=== Complete A1 Grand Prix results ===
(key) (Races in bold indicate pole position) (Races in italics indicate fastest lap)

Year	Entrant	1	2	3	4	5	6	7	8	9	10	11	12	13	14	15	16	17	18	19	20	DC	Points
2007–08	USA	NED; SPR; 22	NED; FEA; 13	CZE; SPR; 16	CZE; FEA; 15	MYS; SPR	MYS; FEA	ZHU; SPR	ZHU; FEA	NZL; SPR	NZL; FEA	AUS; SPR	AUS; FEA	RSA; SPR	RSA; FEA	MEX; SPR	MEX; FEA	SHA; SPR	SHA; FEA	GBR; SPR	GBR; SPR	12th	56

=== International Race of Champions ===
(key) (Bold – Pole position. * – Most laps led.)

International Race of Champions results
Season	Make	1	2	3	4	Pos.	Points	Ref
2005	Pontiac	DAY; 5	TEX; 3	RCH; 4	ATL; 7	4th	46	

==== Camping World Truck Series ====
NASCAR Camping World Truck Series results
Year	Team	No.	Make	1	2	3	4	5	6	7	8	9	10	11	12	13	14	15	16	17	18	19	20	21	22	23	24	25	NCWTC	Pts	Ref
2003	SealMaster Racing	88	Chevy	DAY	DAR	MMR	MAR	CLT	DOV	TEX	MEM	MLW	KAN	KEN	GTW	MCH	IRP	NSH	BRI	RCH	NHA	CAL	LVS<	SBO	TEX	MAR	PHO	HOM; 20	103rd	103	

Sporting positions
Preceded by Anthony Lazzaro	Toyota Atlantic Champion; 2000	Succeeded by Hoover Orsi
Preceded by Gil de Ferran	Indianapolis 500 Winner; 2004	Succeeded by Dan Wheldon
