= Chevrolet Indy V8 =

Ilmor-Chevrolet Indy V-8
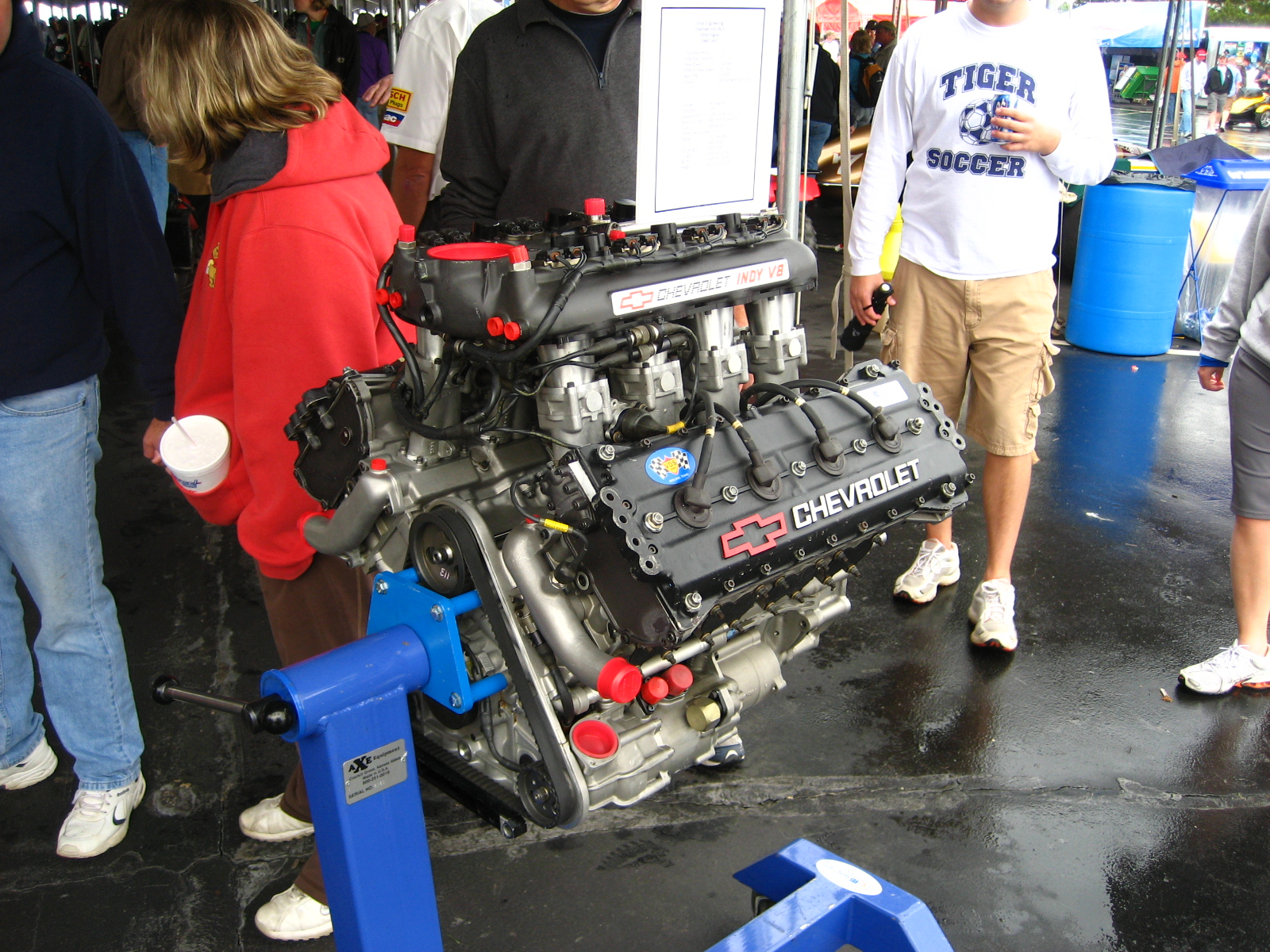

Overview
- Manufacturer: Ilmor-Chevrolet
- Production: 2002–2005

Layout
- Configuration: 90° V-8
- Displacement: 3.0–3.5 L (183–214 cu in)
- Cylinder bore: 3.66 in (93 mm)
- Piston stroke: 2.17–2.53 in (55.1–64.3 mm)
- Cylinder block material: Aluminum
- Cylinder head material: Aluminum
- Valvetrain: 32-valve, DOHC, four-valves per cylinder
- Compression ratio: 15:1

Combustion
- Fuel system: Sequential Electronic fuel injection
- Fuel type: Methanol
- Oil system: Dry sump

Output
- Power output: 600–700 hp (447–522 kW)
- Torque output: 320–380 lb⋅ft (434–515 N⋅m)

Dimensions
- Dry weight: 281 lb (127 kg)

Chronology
- Predecessor: Ilmor-Chevrolet 265-A engine (1993)
- Successor: Chevrolet Indy V6 (2012)

The Chevrolet Indy V8 engine is a 3.0-liter and 3.5-liter, naturally-aspirated V-8 Indy car racing engine, designed and developed by Ilmor, for use in the IRL IndyCar Series; from 2002 to 2005.

== Specifications ==
- Engine type: Chevrolet V-8
- V angle (deg.): 90°
- Capacity: 3,000–3,500 cc (183–214 cu in)
- Horsepower rating: 600–675 hp (447–503 kW) or 700 hp (522 kW)
- Torque rating: Approx. 320–380 ft⋅lbf (434–515 N⋅m) @ 10,300 rpm
- Max RPM: 10,300 rpm - 10,700 rpm
- Weight: 281 lb (127 kg)
- Oil system: Dry-sump lubrication
- Aspiration: Naturally-aspirated
- Camshafts: Gear-driven Double-overhead camshafts
- Cylinder head: 4 valves (titanium) per cylinder
- Fuel injection/system: Sequential EFI with two injectors/cylinder
- Fuel: Methanol
- Block & head material: Aluminum
- Crankshaft bore (mm/in.): 93/3.66
- Crankshaft stroke (mm/in.): 55.1/2.17
- Crankshaft type (deg.): 180°
- Crankshaft: Billet steel
- Con rods: Billet steel
- Pistons: Billet aluminum
- Throttle system: Individual runner throttle bodies
- Mileage: 2.5 mpg
- Gearbox: Sequential manual gearbox

=== Applications ===
- Dallara IR-00
- Dallara IR-03
- G-Force GF05
