= Tony Kanaan =

Brazilian racing driver (born 1974)

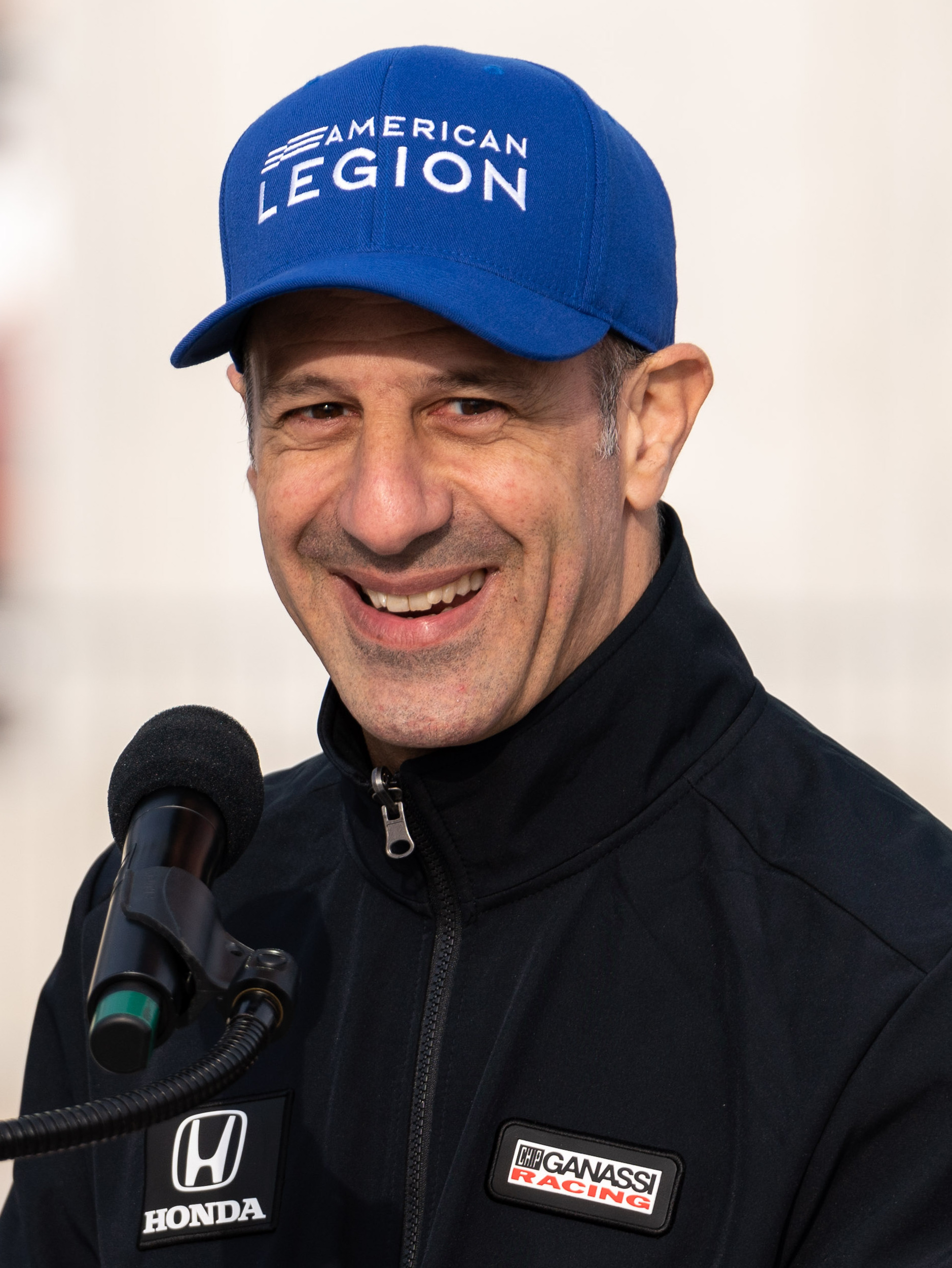
- Kanaan at the Indianapolis Motor Speedway in 2022
- Nationality: (Brazil) Brazilian
- Born: Antoine Rizkallah Kanaan Filho; 31 December 1974 (age 51); Salvador, Bahia, Brazil

IndyCar Series career
- 296 races run over 23 years
- Team: No. 66 (Arrow McLaren)
- 2022 position: 26th
- Best finish: 1st (2004)
- First race: 2002 Indianapolis 500 (Indianapolis)
- Last race: 2023 Indianapolis 500 (Indianapolis)
- First win: 2003 Purex Dial Indy 200 (Phoenix)
- Last win: 2014 MAVTV 500 IndyCar World Championships (Fontana)
Wins	Podiums	Poles
16	73	11

Champ Car career
- 93 races run over 5 years
- Years active: 1998–2002
- Team(s): Tasman Motorsports (1998); Forsythe Racing (1999); Mo Nunn Racing (2000–2002)
- Best finish: 9th (1998, 2001)
- First race: 1998 Marlboro Grand Prix of Miami (Homestead)
- Last race: 2002 Gran Premio Telmex-Gigante (Mexico City)
- First win: 1999 U.S. 500 Presented by Toyota (Michigan)
Wins	Podiums	Poles
1	6	4

24 Hours of Le Mans career
- Years: 2017–2018
- Teams: Ford Chip Ganassi Racing
- Best finish: 22nd (2017)
- Categorisation: FIA Platinum

Championship titles
- 1994 1997 1999 2004 2013 2015: Formula Europa Boxer champion Indy Lights Series champion U.S. 500 winner IndyCar Series champion Indianapolis 500 winner Rolex 24 at Daytona overall winner

Awards
- 1998 2007 2013: CART Championship Series Rookie of the Year; Scott Brayton Award; IndyCar Series Most Popular Driver

Antoine Rizkallah "Tony" Kanaan Filho (born 31 December 1974), nicknamed "TK", is a Brazilian retired racing driver who is the team principal of Arrow McLaren. He is best known for racing in Championship Auto Racing Teams (CART) from 1998 to 2002, and the IndyCar Series from 2002 to 2023. He is the 2004 IndyCar Series champion, and the 2013 Indianapolis 500 champion.

== Career ==
=== Karting and junior formula racing ===
Kanaan debuted in karting at the age of eight. He won multiple São Paulo championships from 1988 to 1990, and also won the Brazilian junior karting championship in 1988. He jumped to formula racing in 1991, finishing 6th in points at the Brazilian Formula Ford 1600. He also won the inaugural race at Ayrton Senna's kartodrome in Tatuí. The following year he finished 5th at the Brazilian Formula Chevrolet.

In 1993, Kanaan competed in the Formula Opel Euroseries, where he placed 10th; he also finished third in the 1993 EFDA Nations Cup with teammate Luiz Garcia Jr. In 1994 he entered the Formula Europa Boxer, where he claimed the title with five wins. In 1995, Kanaan competed in the Italian Formula Three Championship for Tatuus in a Dallara 395-Opel. He won a race and secured nine podiums to rank fifth in points.

Kanaan left Europe for North America in 1996 to race at Indy Lights for Tasman Motorsports, becoming runner-up with two wins and three second pace finishes. He won the title in 1997 with two wins and seven podiums.

=== Championship Auto Racing Teams ===
Kanaan began to compete in CART in 1998 for Tasman Motorsports. He finishing out the season ranked ninth in points, with two podiums, and won the Jim Trueman Rookie of the Year award. In 1999, he signed to drive for Forsythe, and won the pole at the Toyota Grand Prix of Long Beach as well as the U.S. 500 to finish the season ranked 11th.

In 2000, Kanaan moved to Mo Nunn Racing. His best results were a trio of eighth place finishes at the Bosch Spark Plug Grand Prix at Nazareth Speedway, the Motorola 220 at Road America and the Honda Indy 300 on the Surfers Paradise Street Circuit. He finished the season ranked nineteenth.

Kanaan stayed with Mo Nunn Racing for the 2001 season. He got his first podium since winning at Michigan in 1999. Kanaan later qualified on the pole position at the Target Grand Prix at Chicago Motor Speedway. He finished the season ranked ninth.

In 2002, Kanaan's highlight through the first three races of the season was a second-place start at the Bridgestone Potenza 500 at Twin Ring Motegi. Kanaan's best finish in these races was fifteenth at Motegi. At the Miller Lite 250 at the Milwaukee Mile, Kanaan and Mo Nunn Racing switched chassis types to the Lola B02/00. Kanaan qualified on the pole position at both the Grand Prix Americas at Bayfront Park and The 500 Presented by Toyota at California Speedway, and finished third at both the Molson Indy Vancouver on the Streets of Vancouver and the Molson Indy Montreal at Circuit Gilles Villeneuve. Kanaan finished the season in 12th.

=== IndyCar series ===
In 2002, Kanaan and Mo Nunn Racing competed in the Indy Racing League (IRL), making a one-off entry into the Indianapolis 500. Kanaan was the highest-starting rookie in the race, qualifying in fifth place. During the race, Kanaan led for 23 laps, when on lap ninety both Jimmy Vasser and Bruno Junqueira had mechanical problems, slowing on the track. An oil leak on the track was not caught by IRL officials and Kanaan crashed, finishing 28th.

In 2003, Kanaan joined IRL full-time, signing with Andretti Green Racing. Kanaan won the Purex Dial Indy 200 after leading for 79 laps. The victory moved Kanaan to first in the point standings. In the Indianapolis 500 finished third behind Gil de Ferran and Hélio Castroneves. Kanaan finished the season ranked fourth.

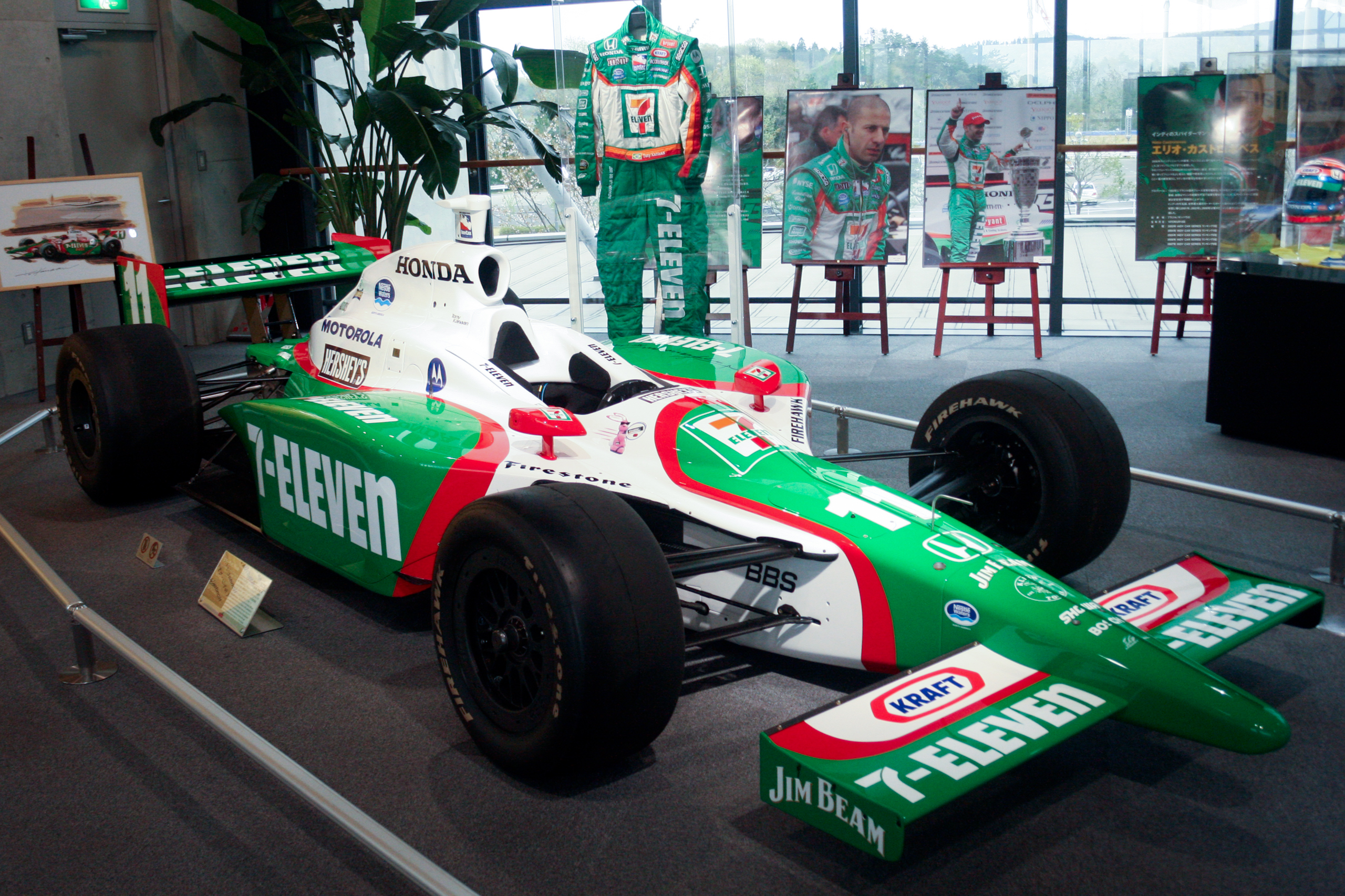
The car Kanaan used to win the 2004 championship at the Honda Collection Hall

In 2004, Kanaan returned with Andretti Green Racing to drive the No. 11 7-Eleven Dallara IR03-Ilmor-Honda Indy V8 HI4R. He won the Copper World Indy 200 at Phoenix International Raceway. Kanaan won the Bombardier 500 at Texas Motor Speedway and the Firestone Indy 200 at Nashville Superspeedway. Kanaan completed all 3,305 laps during the season. His 618 points secured the championship.

For 2005, Kanaan returned with Andretti Green Racing in the No. 11 7-Eleven Dallara IR05-Ilmor-Honda Indy V8 HI4R.

Kanaan returned with Andretti Green Racing in the No. 11 7-Eleven Dallara IR05-Ilmor-Honda Indy V8 HI4R in 2006. Kanaan's only win was at the ABC Supply Company A. J. Foyt 225 at the Milwaukee Mile. On 28 May, Kanaan's friend Rubens Barrichello wore Kanaan's helmet livery during the Formula One Monaco Grand Prix and Kanaan wore Barrichello's helmet during the Indianapolis 500. The pair created a charity offering financial and technical aid to institutions within the voluntary sector, the Barrichello Kanaan Institute. Kanaan had an issue with another friends and former teammate from his time at Tasman Motorsports, Hélio Castroneves. Kanaan and Castroneves had developed an intense rivalry that resulted in hard feelings. Castroneves accused Kanaan of costing him the 2006 series championship by racing him too hard for position in the final race. Kanaan countered that he was not paid to let other people pass him for the position. Kanaan finished sixth with 384 points.

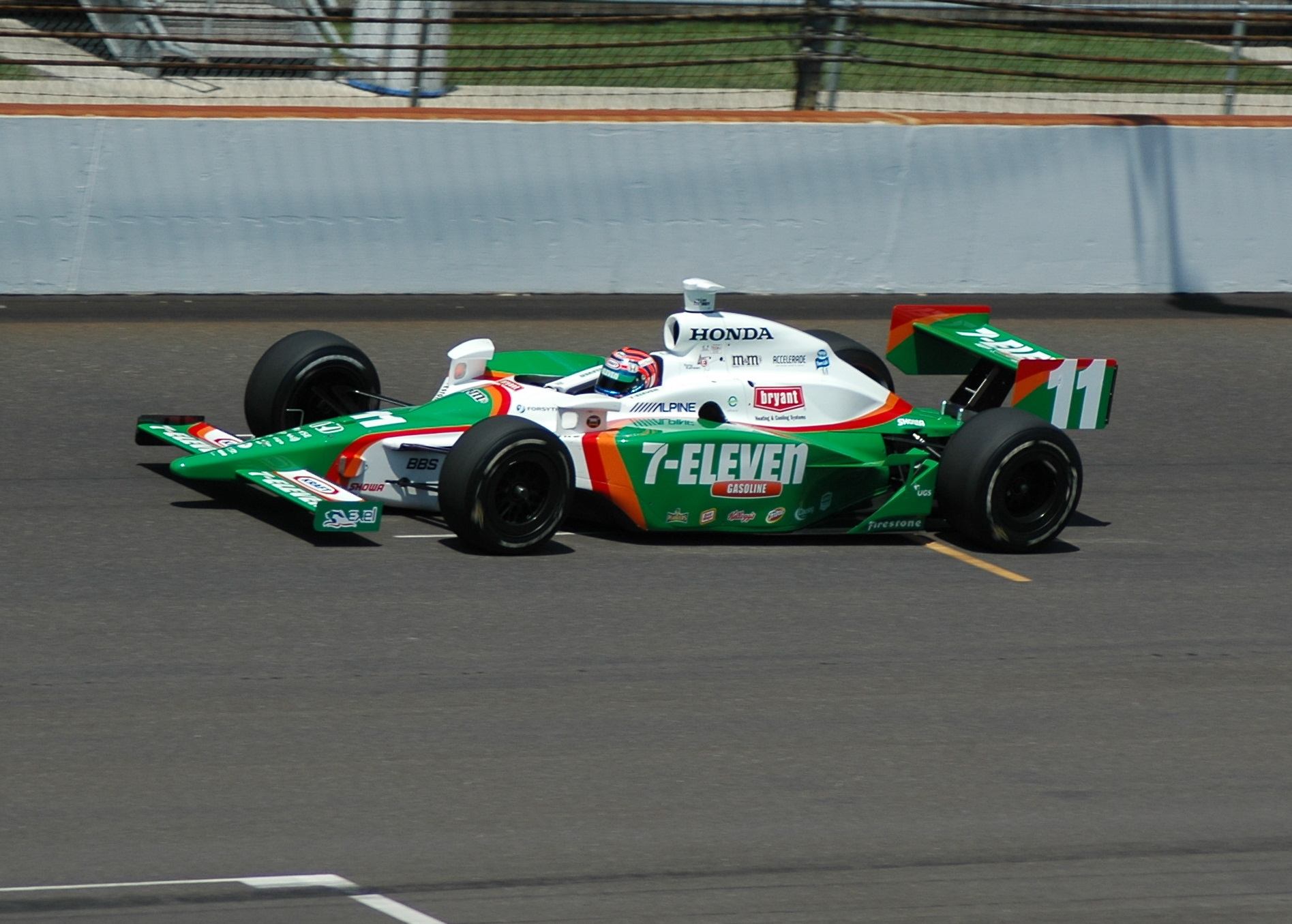
Kanaan practicing for the 2007 Indianapolis 500

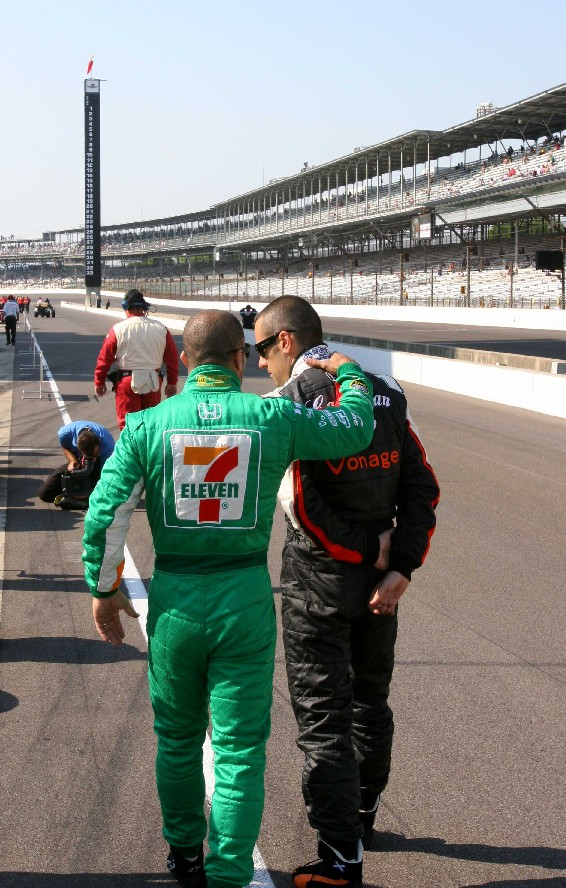
Kanaan talking with his friend and teammate Dario Franchitti during qualifying for the 2007 Indianapolis 500

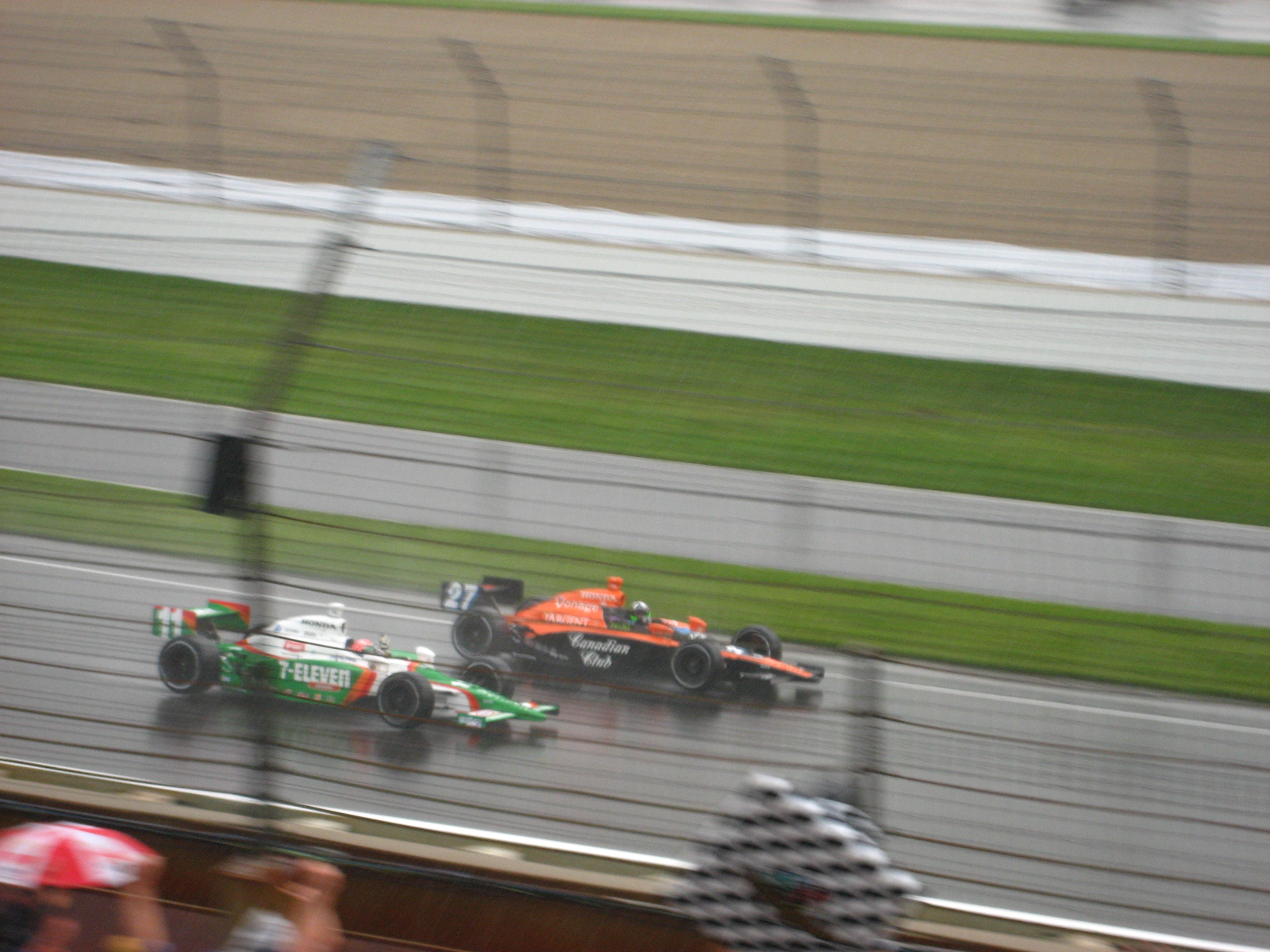
Kanaan congratulating teammate and friend Dario Franchitti after he won the 2007 Indianapolis 500

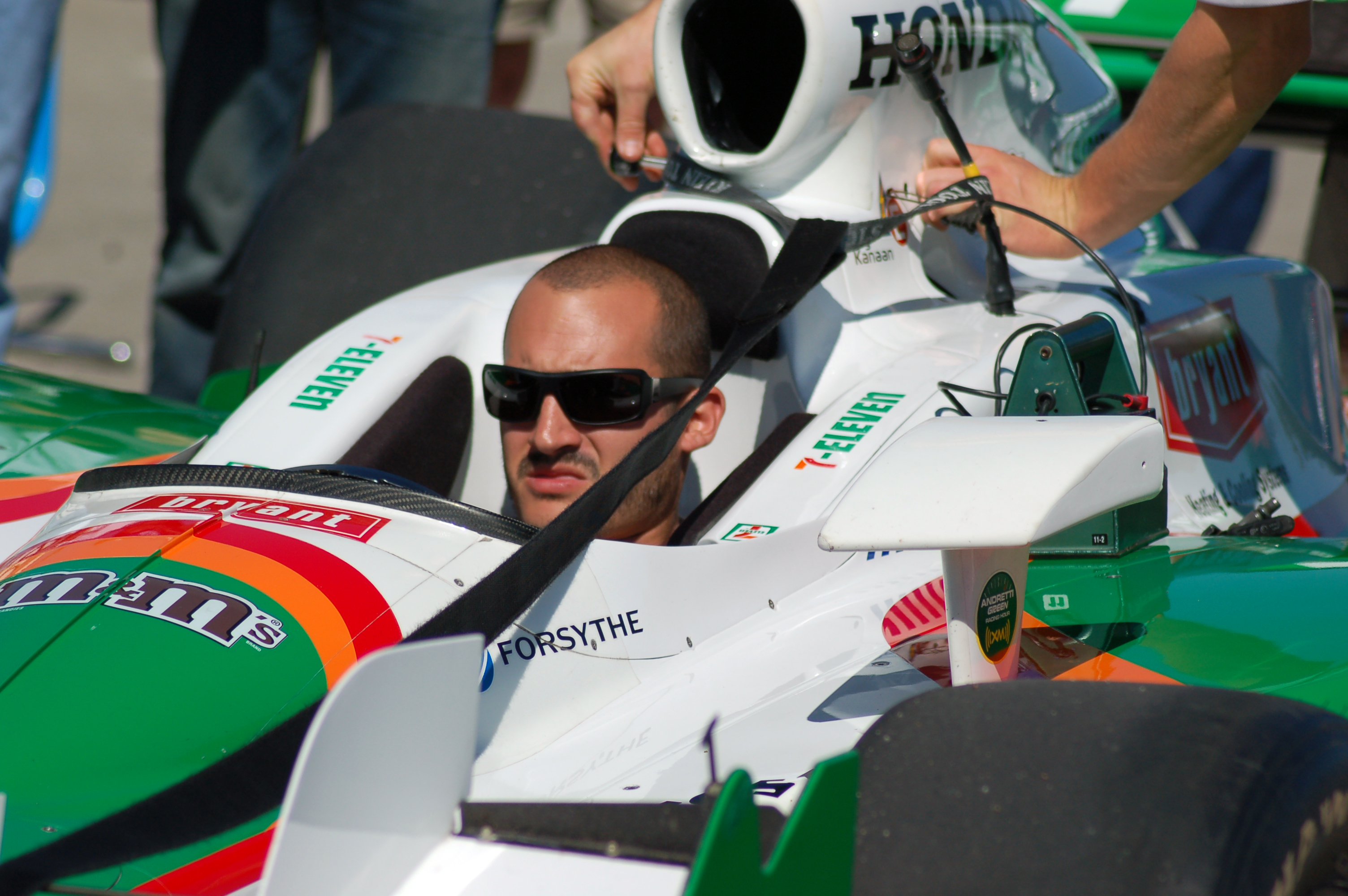
Kanaan's car on pit lane at an event during the 2007 season

Kanaan had his winningest season during 2007 in the No. 11 7-Eleven Dallara IR5-Honda Indy V8 HI7R for Andretti Green Racing. Kanaan won the Indy Japan 300 at Twin Ring Motegi. At the Indianapolis 500 Kanaan won the Scott Brayton Award for showing the spirit of the late Scott Brayton, who was killed while practicing for the 1996 Indianapolis 500. After a complicated race with cautions and a temporary stop, Kanaan was often referred to, along with team owner Michael Andretti, as one of the best drivers never to win the Indianapolis 500. Kanaan won the ABC Supply Company A. J. Foyt 225. Kanaan won again at the Firestone Indy 400. Kanaan dominated the following race, the Meijer Indy 300 at Kentucky Speedway. Kanaan's fifth win came at the Detroit Indy Grand Prix. Kanaan infamously got into a fight with Hornish that eventually involved Michael Andretti and fifteen to twenty others. Despite winning a season-high number of races (five) Kanaan finished third in points, behind Franchitti and Dixon.

In 2008, Kanaan returned with Andretti Green Racing in the No. 11 7-Eleven Dallara IR5-Honda Indy V8 HI7R. Kanaan rose above the controversy to finish third in points with 513 points.

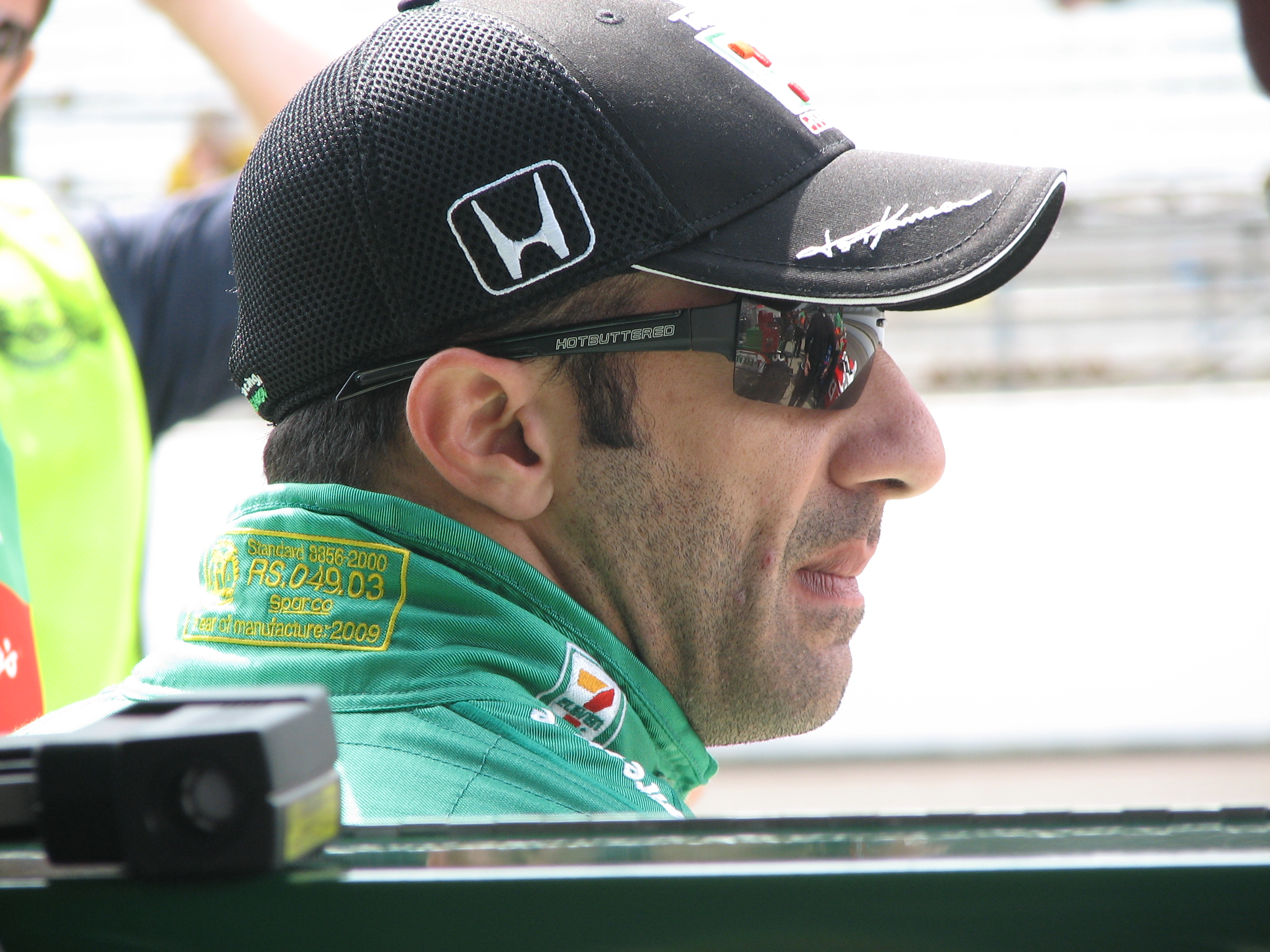
Kanaan at the Indianapolis Motor Speedway for the second day of qualifying of the 2009 Indianapolis 500.

Kanaan returned with Andretti Green Racing for 2009 in the No. 11 7-Eleven Dallara IR5-Honda Indy V8 HI7R. Kanaan suffered bruised ribs in Indy 500. Despite the injuries, Kanaan did not miss any races. Kanaan finished sixth in points with 386 points.

In 2010, Kanaan returned to drive the No. 11 7-Eleven Dallara IR5-Honda Indy V8 HI7R. In October Kanaan was released from his contract with Andretti after 7-Eleven announced it would not return as Kanaan's primary sponsor. Kanaan won fourteen races and one championship in eight years with Andretti. He later said that teammate Ryan Hunter-Reay's technical feedback improved his own performance that season. When Hunter-Reay's funding came into question, Kanaan agreed to forgo part of his salary to help him complete the season.

Kanaan then drove for KV Racing Technology-Lotus, owned by Kanaan's former rival Jimmy Vasser, in the No. 82 GEICO/Lotus Cars Dallara IR5-Honda Indy V8 HI7R in a car based on the Lotus 38-Ford V8. Kanaan was involved in a spectacular crash at the MoveThatBlock.com Indy 225 at New Hampshire Motor Speedway with Andretti and Tomas Scheckter that had Kanaan flip down the track's back straightaway and hit a portable toilet located next to the track, finishing 22nd. Kanaan finished ranked fifth in points with 366 points.

Kanaan returned with KV Racing Technology in 2012 to drive the No. 11 GEICO/Mouser Electronics-sponsored Dallara DW12-Ilmor-Chevrolet Indy V6. Kanaan finished second in the oval standings with 148 points.

In 2013, Kanaan returned with KV Racing Technology in the No. 11 Hydroxycut Dallara DW12-Ilmor-Chevrolet Indy V6. At the Indianapolis 500 Kanaan qualified in 12th place. Kanaan moved up through the field and battled for the lead with Ed Carpenter, Ryan Hunter-Reay and Marco Andretti. On lap 197, Kanaan passed Hunter-Reay for the lead on a restart for a crash by Graham Rahal with Carlos Muñoz, Hunter-Reay and Andretti behind. The race finished under caution for the fourth consecutive year. Kanaan won at an average speed of 187.433 miles per hour, breaking the record set by Arie Luyendyk in the 1990 race. The race also set the record for the number of lead changes in the race with 68, breaking the previous record of 34. Kanaan later said "I was known for not winning and now I am known for winning. The last lap was the longest lap of my life. I get to put my ugly face on that trophy." Kanaan tied Sam Hanks as the most experienced driver to win, in their twelfth start. Kanaan finished eleventh with 397 points, his first full-time IndyCar season to finish out of the top-ten in points. Kanaan won the series' Most Popular Driver award.

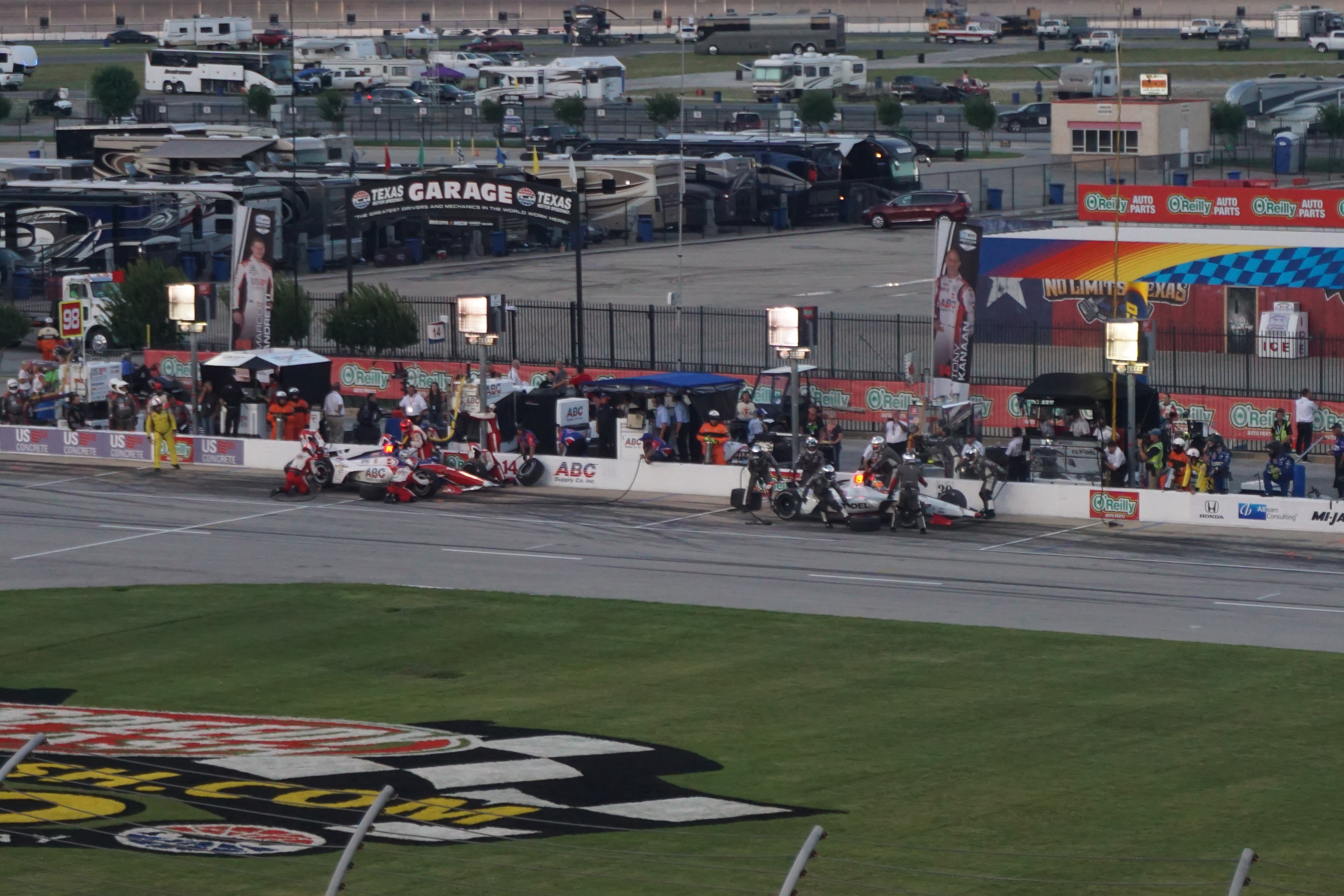
Kanaan (left) at Texas in 2019

In 2014, Kannaan drove for Target Chip Ganassi Racing in the No. 10 Target Dallara DW12-Ilmor-Chevrolet Indy V6. Kanaan finished 7th in points with 544 points his best since the 2011 season.

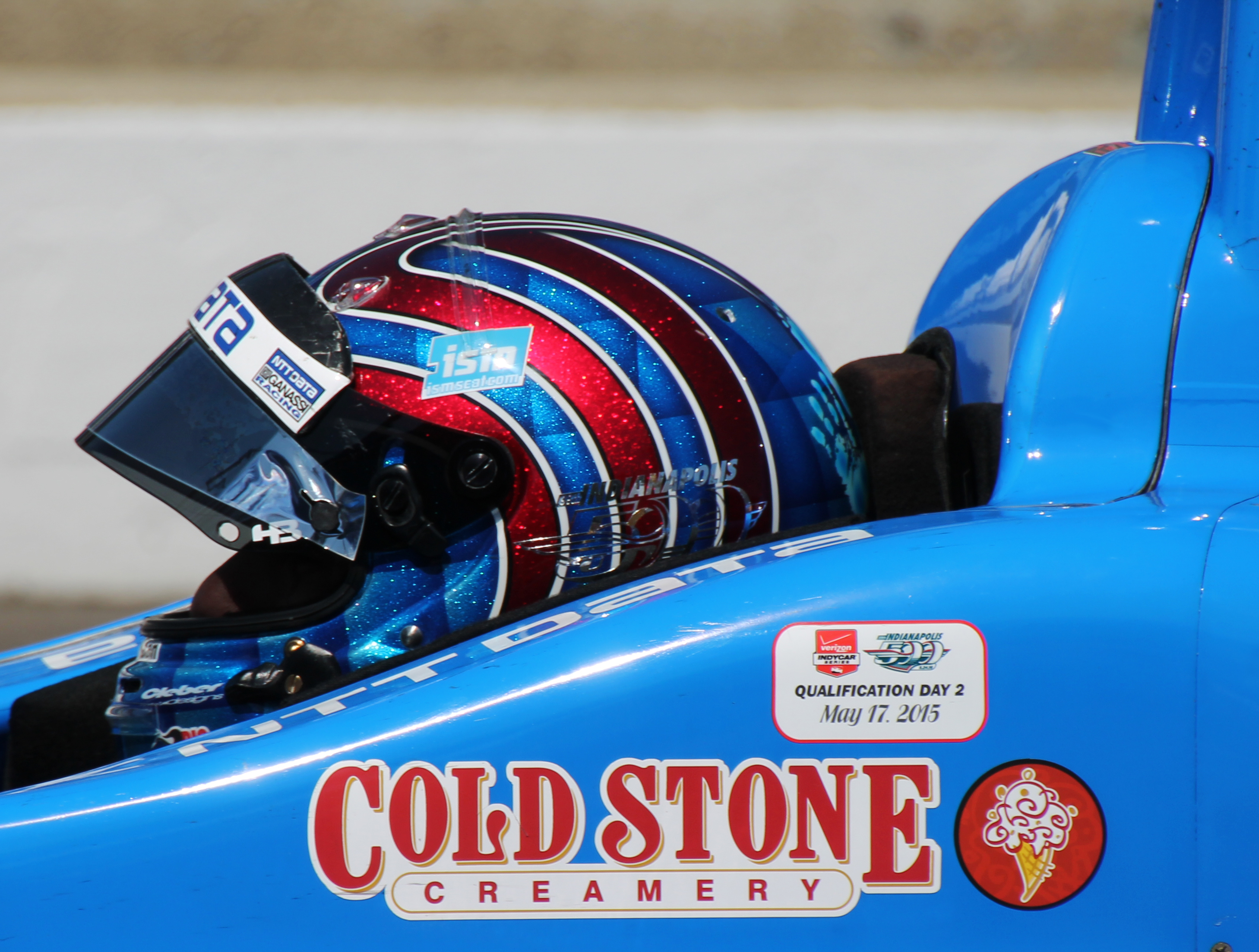
Kanaan in the driver's seat of the No. 10 NTT Data IndyCar

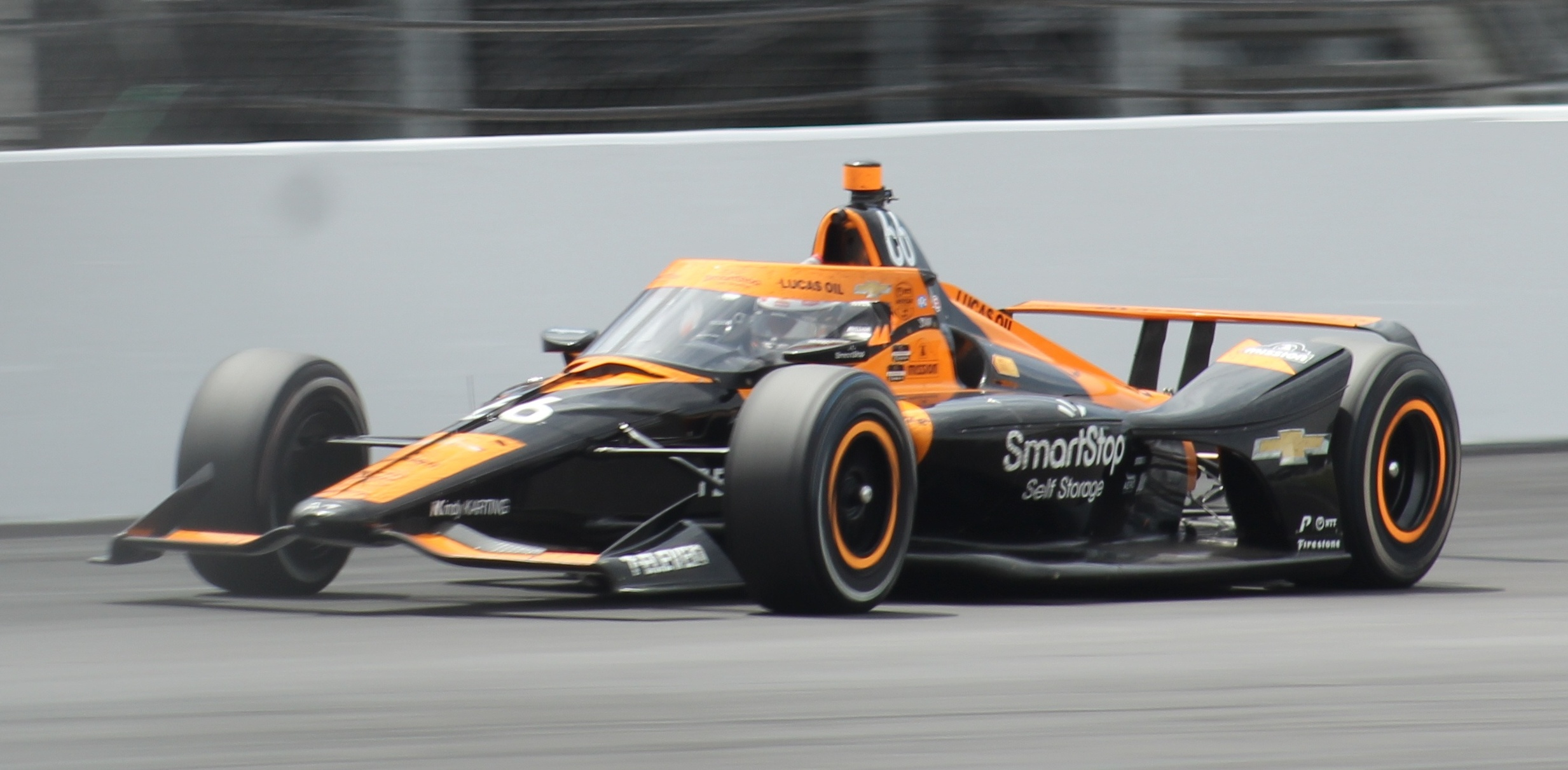
Kanaan during the 2023 Indianapolis 500, his final IndyCar Series race

In 2015, Kanaan began to drive the No. 10 NTT Data Chevy for Ganassi. In 2017 Kanaan had his worst and last season in the No.10 NNT Data Chevy for Ganassi. In 2018 Kanaan drove the No.14 ABC Supply Chevy for A. J. Foyt Racing. In 2018 and 2019, he finished no better than fifteenth. He stated that the 2020 season would be his last, running only a five-race schedule. In 2021, he returned to Chip Ganassi Racing on a partial schedule, driving the No. 48 Dallara Honda on oval courses.

== Sports car racing ==
=== United States Road Racing Championship ===
Kanaan competed in the Sports Car Club of America United States Road Racing Championship in 1998. He competed only at the Rolex 24 at Daytona. Kanaan drove the No. 4 Tom Gloy Racing Ford Mustang Cobra. Kanaan finished 19th in points in the GT1 class with 35 points.

=== American Le Mans Series ===
Kanaan competed in the American Le Mans Series in 2007 in the No. 26 XM Satellite Radio Acura Courage ARX-01a-Acura AL7R 3.4L V8 for Andretti Green Racing in the LMP2 class. Bryan Herta and Dario Franchitti shared driving with Kanaan at the Mobil 1 12 Hours of Sebring and won its class, finishing 2nd overall. Kanaan came 17th with 39 points.

Kanaan returned in 2008 in the No. 26 XM Satellite Radio Acura ARX-01b-Acura AL7R 3.4 L V8 for Andretti Green Racing. Kanaan drove at the Monterey Sports Car Championships. The car started 5th in class and won, finishing 3rd overall. Kanaan finished 22nd in the LMP2 standings.

=== Rolex Grand-Am Sports Car Series ===
Kanaan first competed in the Rolex Grand-Am Sports Car Series in 2013. Kanaan finished 58th in the DP standings with 22 points and 138th in the GT standings with 16 points.

=== Tudor United SportsCar Championship ===
Kanaan first competed in the Tudor United SportsCar Championship for Chip Ganassi Racing in the No. 02 Riley MkXXVI-Ford EcoBoost 3.5L Turbo V6 in the P class. Kanaan came 38th with fifty points in the P class.

=== 24 Hours of Le Mans ===
Kanaan made his 24 Hours of Le Mans debut in 2017, in the No. 68 Ford Chip Ganassi Team USA Ford GT

== Formula Nippon ==
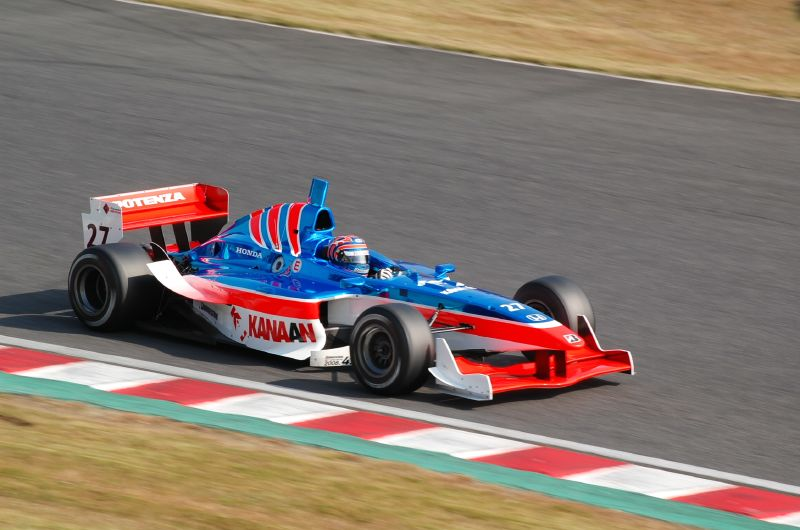
Kanaan competing in the 2007 Formula Nippon race at the Suzuka Circuit.

Kanaan competed in Formula Nippon in 2007 for Kanaan Racing in the No. 27 Bridgestone Potenza Lola FN06-Mugen Honda HF386E. Kanaan competed only in the Suzuka Circuit as a special entrant, finishing in sixth place.

== Prelude to the Dream ==
In 2010, Tony Stewart offered the driver who won the 2010 Indianapolis 500 a chance to drive in his charity race, the Prelude to the Dream at Eldora Speedway Kanaan participated after Indianapolis 500 winner Dario Franchitti opted out. Kanaan drove the No. 11 7-Eleven Cadillac for GRT Race Cars in a car based on his Andretti Autosport car from 2003 to 2010. The race had drivers competing on teams, each representing a different children's hospital. Kanaan represented the St. Jude Children's Research Hospital. He finished 24th.

Kanaan returned in 2011 with GRT Race Cars in the No. 82 GEICO/Lotus Cars/Honda. He represented the Children's Medical Center.

In 2012, Kanaan returned to drive the No. 11 GEICO/Mouser Electronics/Itaipava/Braskem Chevrolet for GRT Race Cars. He finished 22nd.

== Touring car and stock car racing ==
=== International Touring Car Championship ===
In 1996, Kanaan drove a Opel Calibra at the Interlagos round of the International Touring Car Championship.

=== Stock Car Brasil ===
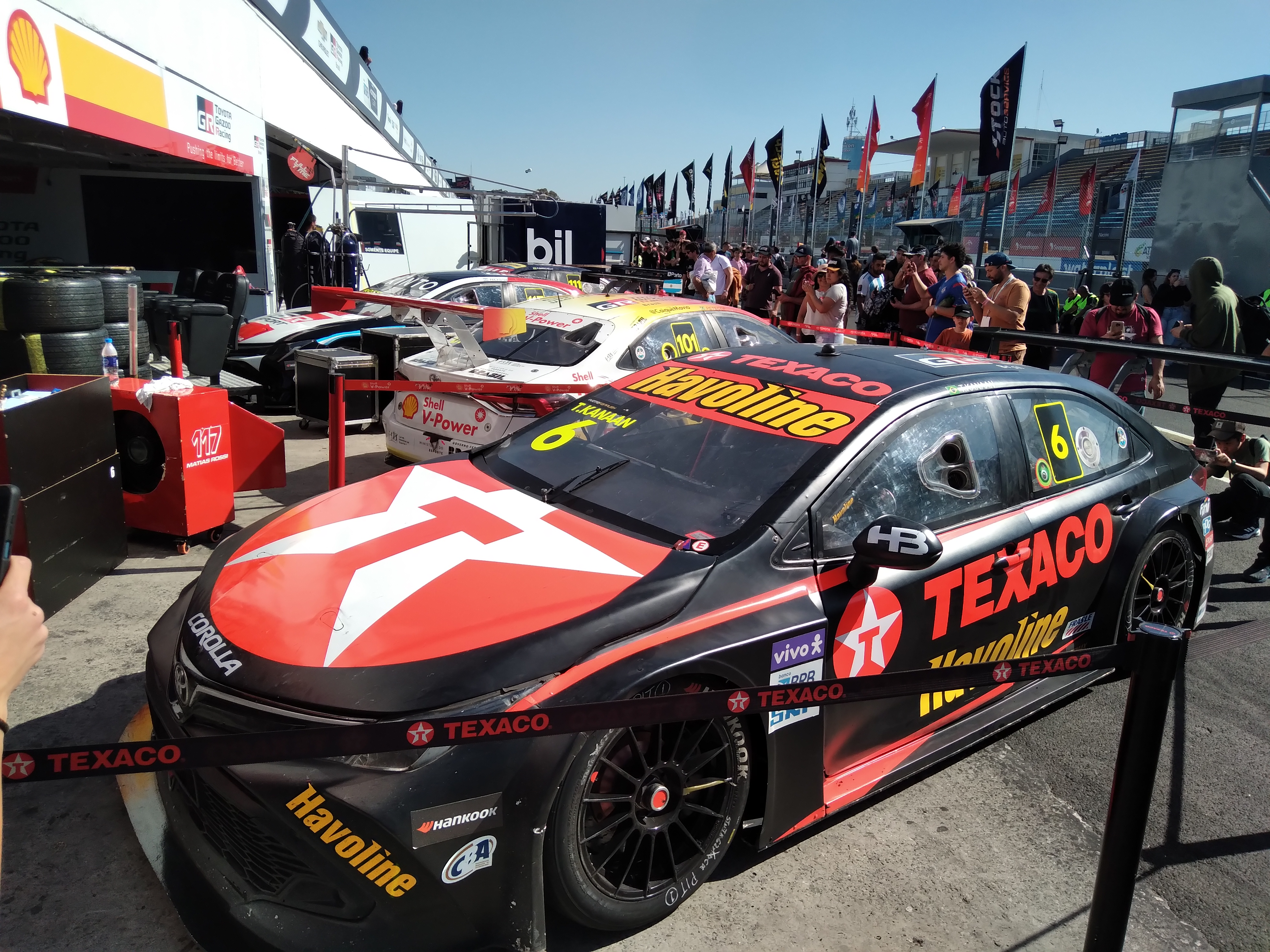
Kanaan's car in Stock Car Brasil in 2023

In 2012, Kanaan began to compete in Stock Car Brasil in the No. 100 Bassani Racing Peugeot 408 at Autódromo Internacional Nelson Piquet, finishing nineteenth. At the next race, the Stock Car Corrida do Milhão, he finished 31st place, retiring after eight laps.

Kanaan raced full-time in the 2021 season, driving a Toyota Corolla for Full Time Bassani.

=== Superstar Racing Experience ===
In 2021, Kanaan entered four races of the Superstar Racing Experience, an all-star stock car racing series. His best results were seventh at Stafford and Eldora.

== Personal life ==
Kanaan is of Lebanese heritage. He is a member of the "brat pack", a group of CART drivers who were close friends off the track, along with Dario Franchitti, Max Papis and the late Greg Moore.

Kanaan is a triathlete. He credits triathlon training for his ability to stay in shape for driving. Kanaan completed half Ironman competitions (1.2-mile swim/56-mile bike/13.1-mile run) and competed in the Ironman World Championships (2.4-mile swim/112-mile bike/26.2-mile run) in 2011 with a time of 12:52:40. Kanaan married twice and has four children.

On July 30, 2026 it was announced that Kanaan has become a member of the strategic ownership group of Legacy Motor Club, a NASCAR racing team that is co-owned by seven time NASCAR Cup champion, Jimmie Johnson.

== Media appearances ==
=== Film and television ===
Kanaan appears in the 2001 film Driven as himself in a scene among drivers preparing for the final race of the season (and film) at the Belle Isle racing circuit, in Detroit. The racing series used for the film is the FedEx CART Championship Series, which Kanaan raced in at the time for Mo Nunn Racing.

The first episode of the television series IndyCar 36 was about Kanaan's weekend leading up to the 2012 Honda Grand Prix of St. Petersburg on the Streets of St. Petersburg.

Kanaan appeared in an episode of Celebrity Family Feud in 2016 and competed on a team with Helio Castroneves, Will Power, James Hinchcliffe, and Conor Daly.

== Racing record ==
=== American open–wheel racing results ===
(key)

==== Indy Lights presented by Cooper Tires ====
Year	Team	Chassis	Engine	1	2	3	4	5	6	7	8	9	10	11	12	13	Rank	Points
1996	Tasman Motorsports	Lola T96/20	Buick V6	MIA; 10	LBH; 2	NAZ; 12	MIS; 17	MIL; 7	DET; 1	**POR**; 5	CLE; 19	TOR; 24	TRO; 2	VAN; 2	**LS**; 1		**2nd**	**113**
1997	Tasman Motorsports	Lola T97/20	Buick V6	MIA; 6	LBH; 5	NAZ; 5	SAV; 23	STL; 10	MIL; 3	**DET**; 1	POR; 3	**TOR**; 2	TRO; 1	VAN; 2	**LS**; 2	FON; 9	**1st**	**156**

==== CART World Series ====
Year	Team	No.	Chassis	Engine	1	2	3	4	5	6	7	8	9	10	11	12	13	14	15	16	17	18	19	20	21	Rank	Points	Ref
1998	Tasman Motorsports	21	Reynard 98i	Honda HRK	MIA; 29	MOT; 6	LBH; 5	NZR; 9	RIO; 27	STL; 24	MIL; 17	DET; 8	POR; 4	CLE; 14	TOR; 22	MIS; 11	MOH; 8	ROA; 4	VAN; 18	LS; 3	HOU; 3	SRF; 7	FON; 19			9th	92	
1999	Forsythe Racing	44	Reynard 99i	Honda HRS	MIA; 21	MOT; 6	**LBH**; 22	NZR; 23	RIO; 5	STL; 7	MIL; 18	POR; 15	CLE; 22	ROA; 6	TOR; 17	MIS; 1	DET; 6	MOH; 23	CHI; 11	VAN; 9	LS; 21	HOU; 9	SRF; 6	FON; 8		11th	85	
2000	Mo Nunn Racing	55	Reynard 2Ki	Ilmor-Mercedes-Benz IC108F	MIA; 10	LBH; 16	RIO; 18	MOT; 16	NZR; 8	MIL; 10	DET; DNS	POR	CLE	TOR	MIS; 24	CHI; 16	MOH; 13	ROA; 8	VAN; 14	LS; 22	STL; 13	HOU; 10	SRF; 8	FON; 18		19th	24	
2001	Mo Nunn Racing	55	Reynard 01i	Honda HR-1	MTY; 7	LBH; 7	TXS; NH	NZR; 16	MOT; 3	MIL; 6	DET; DNS	POR; 24	CLE; 16	TOR; 10	MIS; 21	**CHI**; 8	MOH; 5	ROA; 12	VAN; 4	LAU; 7	ROC; 8	HOU; 12	LS; 8	SRF; 17	FON; 5	9th	93	
2002	Mo Nunn Racing	10	Reynard 02i	Honda HR-2	MTY; 16	LBH; 20	MOT; 15																			12th	99	
2002	Mo Nunn Racing	10	Lola B02/00	Honda HR-2				MIL; 16	LS; 12	POR; 8	CHI; 8	TOR; 17	CLE; 8	VAN; 3	MOH; 14	ROA; 4	MTL; 3	DEN; 6	ROC; 15	**MIA**; 9	SRF; 5	**FON**; 4	MXC; 8*			12th	99	

==== IndyCar Series ====
(key)

Year	Team	No.	Chassis	Engine	1	2	3	4	5	6	7	8	9	10	11	12	13	14	15	16	17	18	19	Rank	Points	Ref
2002	Mo Nunn Racing	17	G-Force	Chevrolet	HMS	PHX	FON	NZR	INDY; 28	TXS	PPIR	RIR	KAN	NSH	MIS	KTY	STL	CHI	TX2					50th	2	
2003	Andretti Green Racing	11	Dallara	Honda	**HMS**; 4	**PHX**; 1	MOT; 14	INDY; 3	TXS; 2	**PPIR**; 2	RIR; 5	KAN; 4	NSH; 9	MIS; 16	STL; 2	KTY; 6	NZR; 18	CHI; 6	FON; 3	TX2; 14				4th	476	
2004	Andretti Green Racing	11	Dallara	Honda	HMS; 8	PHX; 1	MOT; 2	INDY; 2	TXS; 1	RIR; 5	KAN; 3	NSH; 1	MIL; 4	**MIS**; 2	KTY; 5	**PPIR**; 5	NZR; 2	CHI; 3	FON; 2	TX2; 2				1st	618	
2005	Andretti Green Racing	11	Dallara	Honda	HMS; 3	PHX; 3	STP; 2	MOT; 6	**INDY**; 8	TXS; 3	RIR; 19	KAN; 1	NSH; 19	MIL; 4	MIS; 4	KTY; 20	PPIR; 3	SNM; 1	CHI; 5	WGL; 2	FON; 2			2nd	548	
2006	Andretti Green Racing	11	Dallara	Honda	HMS; 11	STP; 3	MOT; 3	INDY; 5	WGL; 11	TXS; 7	RIR; 18	KAN; 5	NSH; 12	MIL; 1	MIS; 4	KTY; 5	SNM; 11	CHI; 7						6th	384	
2007	Andretti Green Racing	11	Dallara	Honda	HMS; 5	STP; 3	MOT; 1	**KAN**; 15	INDY; 12	MIL; 1	TXS; 2	IOW; 16	RIR; 4	WGL; 4	NSH; 18	MOH; 4	MIS; 1	**KTY**; 1	SNM; 4	DET; 1	CHI; 6			3rd	576	
2008	Andretti Green Racing	11	Dallara	Honda	HMS; 8	**STP**; 3	MOT^{1} 5	LBH^{1} DNP	KAN; 2	INDY; 29	MIL; 3	TXS; 5	IOW; 18	**RIR**; 1	WGL; 3	NSH; 4	MOH; 7	EDM; 9	KTY; 8	SNM; 3	DET; 3	CHI; 4		3rd	513	
2009	Andretti Green Racing	11	Dallara	Honda	STP; 5	LBH; 3	KAN; 3	INDY; 27	MIL; 19	TXS; 8	IOW; 14	RIR; 6	WGL; 8	TOR; 17	EDM; 21	KTY; 3	MOH; 10	SNM; 8	CHI; 13	MOT; 11	HMS; 4			6th	386	
2010	Andretti Autosport	11	Dallara	Honda	SAO; 10	STP; 10	ALA; 8	LBH; 5	KAN; 3	INDY; 11	TXS; 6	IOW; 1	WGL; 21	TOR; 4	EDM; 12	MOH; 17	SNM; 7	CHI; 5	KTY; 4	MOT; 7	HMS; 3			6th	453	
2011	KV Racing Technology-Lotus	82	Dallara	Honda	STP; 3	ALA; 6	LBH; 8	SAO; 22	INDY; 4	TXS; 11	**TXS**; 5	MIL; 19	IOW; 2	TOR; 26	EDM; 4	MOH; 5	NHM; 22	SNM; 28	BAL; 3	MOT; 17	KTY; 17	**LVS^{2}** C		5th	366	
2012	KV Racing Technology	11	Dallara DW12	Chevrolet	STP; 25	ALA; 21	LBH; 4	SAO; 13	INDY; 3	DET; 6	TXS; 11	MIL; 2	IOW; 3	TOR; 4	EDM; 18	MOH; 6	SNM; 10	BAL; 20	FON; 18					9th	351	
2013	KV Racing Technology	11	Dallara DW12	Chevrolet	STP; 4	ALA; 13	LBH; 20	SAO; 21	INDY; 1	DET; 13	DET; 12	TXS; 3	MIL; 10	IOW; 3	POC; 13	TOR; 5	TOR; 24	MOH; 24	SNM; 13	BAL; 15	HOU; 21	HOU; 24	FON; 3	11th	397	
2014	Chip Ganassi Racing	10	Dallara DW12	Chevrolet	STP; 6	LBH; 18	ALA; 9	IMS; 10	INDY; 26	DET; 3	DET; 9	TXS; 6	HOU; 13	HOU; 10	POC; 11	IOW; 3	TOR; 3	TOR; 2	MOH; 21	MIL; 3	SNM; 13	FON; 1		7th	544	
2015	Chip Ganassi Racing	10	Dallara DW12	Chevrolet	STP; 3	NLA; 6	LBH; 5	ALA; 13	IMS; 7	INDY; 26	DET; 20	DET; 13	TXS; 2	TOR; 6	FON; 2	MIL; 6	IOW; 21	MOH; 5	POC; 19	SNM; 4				8th	431	
2016	Chip Ganassi Racing	10	Dallara DW12	Chevrolet	STP; 9	PHX; 4	LBH; 6	ALA; 8	IMS; 25	INDY; 4	DET; 9	DET; 7	ROA; 2	IOW; 7	TOR; 4	MOH; 12	POC; 9	TXS; 3	WGL; 19	SNM; 13				7th	461	
2017	Chip Ganassi Racing	10	Dallara DW12	Honda	STP; 12	LBH; 15	ALA; 7	PHX; 6	IMS; 20	INDY; 5	DET; 15	DET; 10	TXS; 2	ROA; 21	IOW; 9	TOR; 19	MOH; 16	POC; 5	GTW; 16	WGL; 20	SNM; 16			10th	403	
2018	A. J. Foyt Enterprises	14	Dallara DW12	Chevrolet	STP; 11	PHX; 8	LBH; 8	ALA; 18	IMS; 14	INDY; 25	DET; 14	DET; 7	TXS; 21	ROA; 14	IOW; 17	TOR; 6	MOH; 18	POC; 17	GTW; 13	POR; 11	SNM; 12			16th	312	
2019	A. J. Foyt Enterprises	14	Dallara DW12	Chevrolet	STP; 15	COA; 12	ALA; 18	LBH; 19	IMS; 20	INDY; 9	DET; 15	DET; 22	TXS; 16	ROA; 21	TOR; 17	IOW; 10	MOH; 20	POC; 8	GTW; 3	POR; 12	LAG; 16			15th	304	
2020	A. J. Foyt Enterprises	14	Dallara DW12	Chevrolet	TXS; 10	IMS	ROA	ROA	IOW; 18	IOW; 11	INDY; 19	GTW; 9	GTW; 19	MOH	MOH	IMS	IMS	STP						24th	106	
2021	Chip Ganassi Racing	48	Dallara DW12	Honda	ALA	STP	TXS; 11	TXS; 15	IMS	INDY; 10	DET	DET	ROA	MOH	TOR	NSH	IMS	GTW; 13	POR	LAG	LBH			28th	96	
2022	Chip Ganassi Racing	1	Dallara DW12	Honda	STP	TXS	LBH	ALA	IMS	INDY; 3	DET	ROA	MOH	TOR	IOW	IOW	IMS	NSH	GTW	POR	LAG			26th	78	
2023	Arrow McLaren	66	Dallara DW12	Chevrolet	STP	TXS	LBH	ALA	IMS	INDY; 16	DET	ROA	MOH	TOR	IOW	IOW	NSH	IMS	GTW	POR	LAG			32nd	18	
2025	Arrow McLaren	17	Dallara DW12	Chevrolet	STP	THE	LBH	ALA	IMS	INDY^{3} DNS	DET	GTW	ROA	MOH	IOW	IOW	TOR	LAG	POR	MIL	NSH			NC	–	

^{1} Run on same day.
^{2} The Las Vegas Indy 300 was abandoned after Dan Wheldon died from injuries sustained in a 15-car crash on lap 11.
^{3} Kanaan was designated as the stand-by driver for Kyle Larson, who was scheduled to race Double Duty. Kanaan passed a Refresher Test on May 15, but was not utilized on race day.

Years	Teams	Races	Poles	Wins	Top 5s	Top 10s	Indianapolis 500 wins	Championships
14	4	206	11	16	104	141	1 (2013)	1 (2004)

==== Indianapolis 500 ====
Year	Chassis	Engine	Start	Finish	Team
2002	G-Force	Chevrolet	5	28	Mo Nunn Racing
2003	Dallara	Honda	2	3	Andretti Green Racing
2004	Dallara	Honda	5	2	Andretti Green Racing
2005	Dallara	Honda	**1**	8	Andretti Green Racing
2006	Dallara	Honda	5	5	Andretti Green Racing
2007	Dallara	Honda	2	12	Andretti Green Racing
2008	Dallara	Honda	6	29	Andretti Green Racing
2009	Dallara	Honda	6	27	Andretti Green Racing
2010	Dallara	Honda	33*	11	Andretti Autosport
2011	Dallara	Honda	22	4	KV Racing Technology
2012	Dallara	Chevrolet	8	3	KV Racing Technology
2013	Dallara	Chevrolet	12	**1**	KV Racing Technology
2014	Dallara	Chevrolet	16	26	Chip Ganassi Racing
2015	Dallara	Chevrolet	4	26	Chip Ganassi Racing
2016	Dallara	Chevrolet	18	4	Chip Ganassi Racing
2017	Dallara	Honda	7	5	Chip Ganassi Racing
2018	Dallara	Chevrolet	10	25	A. J. Foyt Enterprises
2019	Dallara	Chevrolet	16	9	A. J. Foyt Enterprises
2020	Dallara	Chevrolet	23	19	A. J. Foyt Enterprises
2021	Dallara	Honda	5	10	Chip Ganassi Racing
2022	Dallara	Honda	6	3	Chip Ganassi Racing
2023	Dallara	Chevrolet	9	16	Arrow McLaren
2025	Dallara	Chevrolet	DNS**		Arrow McLaren

- 2010: Kanaan qualified 32nd in a backup car but decided to switch back to his primary car for the race. This forced him to start from the 33rd position on the grid.
- 2025: Kanaan was designated as the stand-by driver for Kyle Larson, who was scheduled to race Double Duty. Kanaan passed a Refresher Test on May 15, but was not utilized on race day.

=== 24 Hours of Daytona results ===
Year	Team	Co-drivers	Car	Class	Laps	Pos.	Class Pos.
1998	(United States) Tom Gloy Racing	(United States) Mike Borkowski (United States) Robbie Buhl	Ford Mustang Cobra	GT1	624	11th	**3rd**
2013	(United States) Dener Motorsport	(Brazil) Rubens Barrichello (Brazil) Nonô Figueiredo (Brazil) Felipe Giaffone (Brazil) Ricardo Maurício	Porsche 911 GT3 Cup	GT	352	46th	28th
2014	(United States) Chip Ganassi Racing with Felix Sabates	(New Zealand) Scott Dixon (United States) Kyle Larson (United Kingdom) Marino Franchitti	Riley Mk. XXVI-Ford	P	667	15th	8th
2015	(United States) Chip Ganassi Racing with Felix Sabates	(New Zealand) Scott Dixon (United States) Kyle Larson (United States) Jamie McMurray	Riley Mk. XXVI-Ford	P	740	**1st**	**1st**
2016	(United States) Chip Ganassi Racing with Felix Sabates	(New Zealand) Scott Dixon (United States) Kyle Larson (United States) Jamie McMurray	Riley Mk. XXVI-Ford	P	708	13th	7th
2017	(United States) Ford Chip Ganassi Racing	(United Kingdom) Harry Tincknell (United Kingdom) Andy Priaulx	Ford GT	GTLM	652	9th	5th

=== Complete American Le Mans Series results ===
Year	Entrant	Class	Chassis	Engine	1	2	3	4	5	6	7	8	9	10	11	12	Rank	Points
2007	Andretti Green Racing	LMP2	Acura ARX-01a	Acura 3.4L V8	SEB; 1	STP	LBH	HOU	UTA	LRP	MOH	ROA	MOS	DET	PET; Ret	LAG; 4	17th	39
2008	Andretti Green Racing	LMP2	Acura ARX-01b	Acura 3.4L V8	SEB	STP	LBH	UTA	LRP	MOH	ROA	MOS	DET	PET; 7	LAG; 1		22nd	39

=== Complete Formula Nippon results ===
Year	Entrant	1	2	3	4	5	6	7	8	9	DC	Points
2007	Kanaan Racing	FUJ	SUZ	MOT	OKA	SUZ	FUJ	SUG	MOT	SUZ; 6	NC†	0†

† Ineligible for championship points.

=== Complete Stock Car Pro Series results ===
(key) (Races in bold indicate pole position) (Races in italics indicate fastest lap)

Year	Team	Car	1	2	3	4	5	6	7	8	9	10	11	12	13	14	15	16	17	18	19	20	21	22	23	24	Rank	Points
2012	RC3 Bassani	Peugeot 408	INT	CTB	VEL	RBP	LON	RIO	SAL	CAS	TAR	CTB	BSB; 19	INT; Ret													NC†	0†
2021	Full Time Bassani	Toyota Corolla	GOI; 1 Ret	GOI; 2 DNS	INT; 1; 21	INT; 2; 12	VCA; 1; 22	VCA; 2 Ret	VCA; 1; 21	VCA; 2 Ret	CAS; 1; 21	CAS; 2; 15	CUR; 1; 23	CUR; 2; 22	CUR; 1	CUR; 2	GOI; 1 Ret	GOI; 2 DNS	GOI; 1; 21	GOI; 2 Ret	VCA; 1; 27	VCA; 2; 19	SCZ; 1; 25	SCZ; 2; 17	INT; 1; 25	INT; 2 Ret	32nd	24
2022	Full Time Bassani	Toyota Corolla	INT; 1; 20	GOI; 1; 11	GOI; 2; 12	RIO; 1; 22	RIO; 2; 16	VCA; 1; 21	VCA; 2; 4	VEL; 1; 25	VEL; 2; 17	VEL; 1; 20	VEL; 2 DSQ	INT; 1; 17	INT; 2; 10	VCA; 1; 30	VCA; 2; 14	SCZ; 1; 23	SCZ; 2; 15	GOI; 1; 30	GOI; 2; 15	GOI; 1; 25	GOI; 2; 16	BRA; 1; 21	BRA; 2; 13		22nd	102
2023	Texaco Racing	Toyota Corolla	GOI; 1; 23	GOI; 2 Ret	INT; 1; 17	INT; 2; 19	TAR; 1	TAR; 2	CAS; 1 Ret	CAS; 2; 22	INT; 1; 25	INT; 2; 25	VCA; 1; 21	VCA; 2; 14	GOI; 1; 18	GOI; 2; 18	VEL; 1; 18	VEL; 2 Ret	BUE; 1; 24	BUE; 2; 14	VCA; 1; 21	VCA; 2; 18	CAS; 1; 22	CAS; 2; 24	INT; 1; 26	INT; 2 Ret	30th	29

^{†} Driver ineligible for championship points.

=== Complete IMSA SportsCar Championship results ===
(key) (Races in bold indicate pole position) (Races in italics indicate fastest lap)

Year	Team	Class	Make	Engine	1	2	3	4	5	6	7	8	9	10	11	Pos.	Points
2014	Chip Ganassi Racing with Felix Sabates	P	Ford EcoBoost Riley DP	Ford Ecoboost 3.5 L V6 Turbo	DAY; 8	SEB; 6	LBH	LAG	DET	WGL	MOS	IMS	ROA	COA	PET	34th	50
2015	Chip Ganassi Racing with Felix Sabates	P	Ford EcoBoost Riley DP	Ford Ecoboost 3.5 L V6 Turbo	DAY; 1	SEB	LBH	LAG	DET	WGL	MOS	ROA	COA	PET		23rd	36
2016	Ford Chip Ganassi Racing	P	Ford EcoBoost Riley DP	Ford Ecoboost 3.5 L V6 Turbo	DAY; 7	SEB	LBH	LAG	DET	WGL	MOS	ROA	COA	PET		29th	25

=== 24 Hours of Le Mans results ===
Year	Team	Co-Drivers	Car	Class	Laps	Pos.	Class Pos.
2017	(United States) Ford Chip Ganassi Team USA	(United States) Joey Hand (Germany) Dirk Müller	Ford GT	GTE; Pro	339	22nd	6th
2018	(United States) Ford Chip Ganassi Team UK	(United Kingdom) Harry Tincknell (United Kingdom) Andy Priaulx	Ford GT	GTE; Pro	332	36th	12th

=== Complete FIA World Endurance Championship results ===
(key) (Races in bold indicate pole position; races in italics indicate fastest lap)

Year	Entrant	Class	Chassis	Engine	1	2	3	4	5	6	7	8	Rank	Points
2018–19	Ford Chip Ganassi Team UK	LMGTE Pro	Ford GT	Ford EcoBoost 3.5 L Turbo V6	**SPA**; Ret	LMS; 12	SIL	FUJ	SHA	SEB	SPA	LMS	38th	2

=== Superstar Racing Experience ===
(key) * – Most laps led. ^{1} – Heat 1 winner. ^{2} – Heat 2 winner.

Superstar Racing Experience results
Year	No.	1	2	3	4	5	6	SRXC	Pts
2021	48	STA; 7	KNX	ELD; 7	IRP; 10	SLG	NSV; 8	6th	162^{1}
2022	6	FIF; 4*	SBO; 6	STA	NSV; 13	I55; 10	SHA; 11	8th	113
2023	66	STA; 10	STA II; 12	MMS	BER	ELD; 12	IRP	19th	0^{1}

^{*} Season still in progress
^{1} Shared points with Hailie Deegan

Sporting positions
Preceded by David Empringham	Indy Lights; Champion; 1997	Succeeded by Cristiano da Matta
Preceded by Scott Dixon	IndyCar Series; Champion; 2004	Succeeded by Dan Wheldon
Achievements
Preceded by Dario Franchitti	Indianapolis 500 Winner; 2013	Succeeded by Ryan Hunter-Reay
Awards
Preceded by Patrick Carpentier	Champ Car World Series; Rookie of the Year; 1998	Succeeded by Juan Pablo Montoya
Preceded by Sam Hornish Jr.	Scott Brayton Award; 2007	Succeeded by Vítor Meira
