= 36 (TV series) =

- Starring: athlete spotlighted
- Countries of origin: United States and Canada
- No. of episodes: 11

Production
- Running time: 30 minutes

Original release
- Network: NBCSN
- Release: December 14, 2011 – August 3, 2013

36 is a sports documentary television show that airs on NBCSN and TSN. The show is a 36-hour documentary series following a specific athlete, such as Patrick Kane. The show typically airs before the spotlighted player competes on the NBC Sports Network. The show is akin to HBO 24/7. On March 14, 2012, 36 expanded to have an episode about Zab Judah calling the show, Fight Night 36. Meanwhile, a 36 episode about IndyCar Series with Tony Kanaan first aired on April 1, 2012. MLS 36 debuted August 5, 2012 following Major League Soccer player Chris Wondolowski during the 2012 MLS All-Star Game. F1 36 debuted on March 29, 2013 featuring Formula One champion Sebastian Vettel.

== Episodes ==
=== NHL 36 ===
No.	Title	Original release date
1	"Patrick Kane"	December 14, 2011
Patrick Kane is clearly more comfortable in Chicago these days, playing in his fifth season although he's just 23 years old. Scoring the 2010 Stanley Cup winning goal for a title-parched sports town can help with that.
2	"Patrice Bergeron"	January 4, 2012
Ever since he cracked the NHL as an 18-year-old straight out of junior hockey, Patrice Bergeron's movie star looks and superb on-ice skill have made him one of the Boston Bruins' most recognizable and in-demand players.
3	"Nicklas Lidström"	January 25, 2012
Fans interested in getting a look inside the life of a seven-time Norris Trophy winner and four-time Stanley Cup champion are about to have their wishes come true.
4	"Mike Richards"	February 22, 2012
Sometimes after practice, Los Angeles Kings center Mike Richards will put on a pair of shorts in the middle of winter and make his way down to the Manhattan Beach Pier.
5	"James Neal"	March 7, 2012
James Neal is more than the accomplished wingman the Pittsburgh Penguins long coveted to help elite center Evgeni Malkin get back to the top of his game. Follow him as the Penguins take on the Tampa Bay Lightning and the Columbus Blue Jackets.

=== MLS 36 ===
No.	Title	Original release date
1	"Chris Wondolowski"	August 5, 2012
MLS 36 follows San Jose Earthquakes forward Chris Wondolowski as he faces Chelsea during the 2012 MLS All-Star Game.
2	"Fredy Montero"	August 10, 2012
MLS 36 follows Seattle Sounders FC forward Fredy Montero during a friendly against Chelsea.
3	"Dwayne De Rosario"	September 17, 2012
MLS 36 follows D.C. United midfielder Dwayne De Rosario as his team plays against the Philadelphia Union.
4	"Darlington Nagbe"	September 29, 2012
MLS 36 follows Portland Timbers midfielder Darlington Nagbe as his team plays against Vancouver Whitecaps FC in the Cascadia Cup.
5	"Kyle Beckerman"	October 6, 2012
MLS 36 follows Real Salt Lake midfielder and captain Kyle Beckerman as his team plays against D.C. United.
6	"Omar Gonzalez"	June 2, 2013
MLS 36 follows LA Galaxy defender Omar Gonzalez as his team plays against the Houston Dynamo.
7	"Brad Davis"	June 20, 2013
MLS 36 follows Houston Dynamo midfielder Brad Davis.
8	"Diego Fagundez"	August 3, 2013
MLS 36 follows New England Revolution midfielder Diego Fagundez.

=== IndyCar ===
2012

- Tony Kanaan (St. Petersburg)
- Graham Rahal (Barber)
- Ryan Hunter-Reay (Long Beach)
- J. R. Hildebrand (Indianapolis qualifying)
- Hélio Castroneves (Indianapolis 500-Mile Race)
- Charlie Kimball (Texas)
- Ed Carpenter (Iowa)
- James Hinchcliffe (Toronto)
- Simon Pagenaud (Mid-Ohio)
- Will Power (Sonoma)
- Oriol Servia (Baltimore)
- Josef Newgarden (Fontana)

2013

- Charlie Kimball (Long Beach)
- Simona de Silvestro (São Paulo)
- Josef Newgarden (Indy 500)
- Scott Dixon (Texas)

2014

- Kurt Busch ("Double Duty")
