= Double Duty =

Auto racing endurance challenge

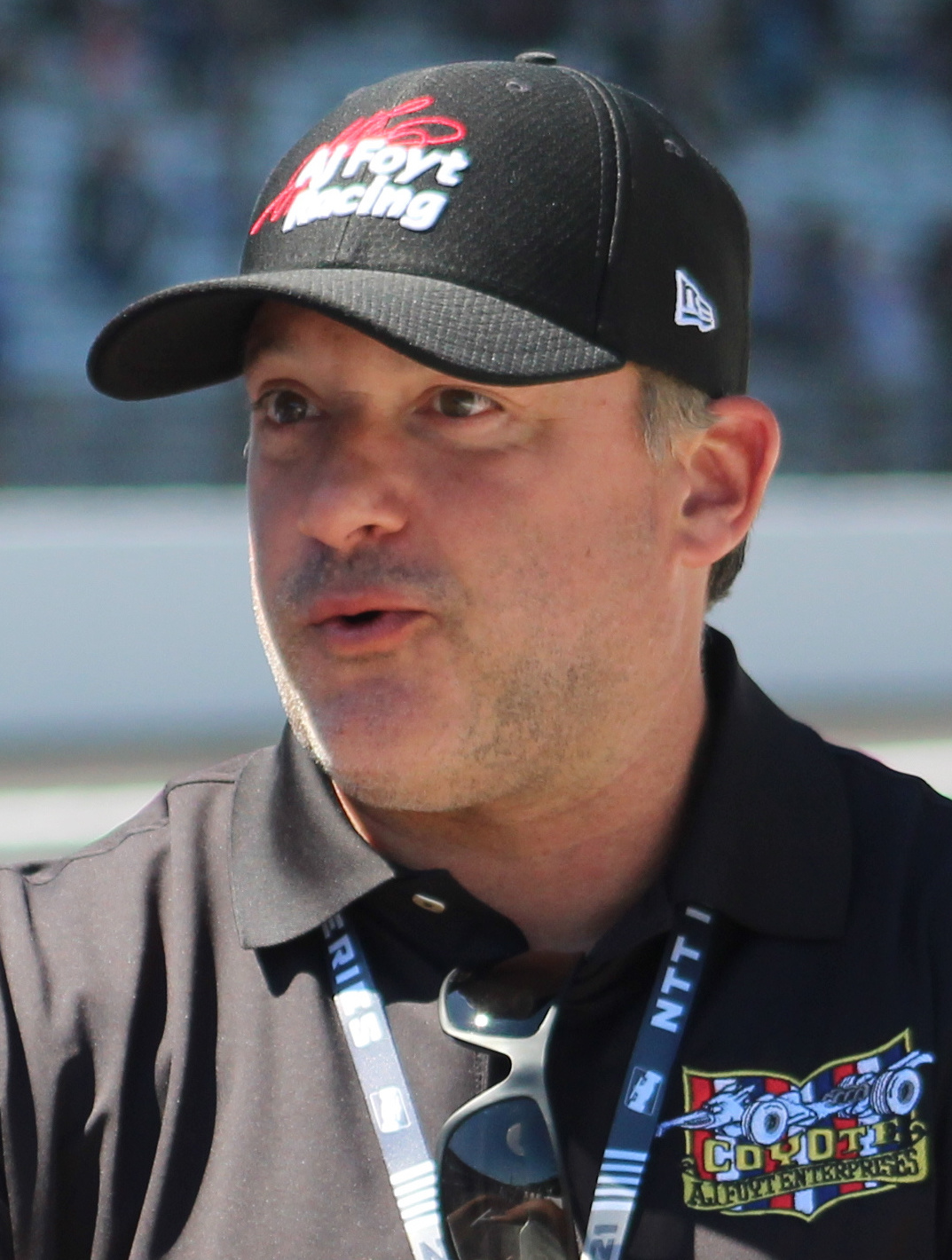
Tony Stewart is the only driver to complete all 1,100 miles of both the Indianapolis 500 and the Coca-Cola 600 without being a lap down. He achieved this in 2001.

Double Duty (also referred to as the Indy-Charlotte Double or Memorial Day Double) is an American auto racing term used to describe one of the most difficult feats in motorsport: in a single day, competing in both the Indianapolis 500 IndyCar Series race at Indianapolis Motor Speedway and the Coca-Cola 600 NASCAR Cup Series race at Charlotte Motor Speedway.

The Indianapolis 500 is the most prestigious IndyCar race, while the Coca-Cola 600, the longest event on the NASCAR Cup Series schedule, has for years been considered one of NASCAR's most important races. Both races are run on the same day on Memorial Day weekend: the Indianapolis 500 run in the early afternoon and the Coca-Cola 600 in the evening. A driver who pulls off the “Double” competes at Indianapolis first, then boards an airplane after the race and flies to Charlotte to complete the feat.

Double Duty is physically demanding and mentally draining; a driver must be in a race car for most of the day, racing for more than 1,000 miles with little or no rest. It is similar in concept to the established discipline of endurance racing, but without the help of a relief driver, and the driver withstanding the very different physical demands of an IndyCar, which was historically run with an open cockpit, but since 2020 has been run with a semi-enclosed cockpit with the introduction of the aeroscreen, and a stock car, in which the driver is enclosed.

Six drivers have attempted the feat, starting with John Andretti on May 29, 1994. In 2001, Tony Stewart became the first and only driver to date to complete all 1,100 miles of both races in the same day. Robby Gordon (1997, 2000, 2002–04) has tried five times, Stewart (1999, 2001) and Kyle Larson (2024–25) twice, and Kurt Busch (2014) and Katherine Legge (2026) once apiece. No driver has won either race while attempting the feat. Stewart's 2001 effort stands as the best combined result: sixth at Indianapolis and third at Charlotte.

Some drivers in the 1960s and 1970s, included Donnie Allison, attempted a "cross-over": running both events when they were scheduled on consecutive days.

== Logistics ==
Charlotte Motor Speedway, a quad-oval

The Indianapolis 500 is part of the NTT IndyCar Series, and the Coca-Cola 600 is part of the NASCAR Cup Series. Both races are held, weather permitting, on the Sunday of Memorial Day weekend. The Indy 500 at the Indianapolis Motor Speedway is traditionally scheduled in the afternoon, while the Coca-Cola 600 at Charlotte Motor Speedway is held as a night race. Since the events are not scheduled to overlap, this allows a driver a small window to travel between venues.

Such an accomplishment can be grueling and physically exhausting. It calls for a driver to race for over seven hours in two entirely different disciplines of racing cars. Along with a 430-mile airplane flight and severe time constraints, the driver has time for only a brief rest aboard the aircraft where they normally take on IV fluids, and are checked out by a physician.

If rain delays one of the races, particularly Indianapolis, it can complicate or prevent the attempt.

Through 2020, NASCAR rules required drivers to attend the pre-race drivers' meeting, generally held about two hours before the race, under penalty of starting from the last position on the grid. Since "Double Duty" attempts start in Indianapolis, drivers attempting the feat have all been required to start at the back of the grid for the Coca-Cola 600. Officials long resisted attempts over the years to lobby for changes, including garage-area petitions, and use of a video-conference device. However, since the COVID-19 pandemic, NASCAR has replaced in-person drivers' meetings with a briefing e-mailed to drivers the day or two before the race and is now willing to excuse drivers from the meeting which is largely ceremonial along with driver introductions, allowing the driver to retain their 600 starting position.

=== Month of May events ===
When a driver attempts "Double Duty", their schedule is not just limited to race day. Additional flights back-and-forth between the venues are required in the two weeks leading up to the races to participate in practice and qualifying for the respective events. Time trials for the Indy 500 are held on Saturday and Sunday one week before the race. This can create conflicts with the NASCAR All-Star Race. Depending on which events are prioritized, at Indianapolis drivers may have to sacrifice Fast Friday track time, additional attempts on Day 1 of qualifying, or participation on Day 2 of qualifying. For the All-Star Race, currently held at Dover Motor Speedway, drivers may have to sacrifice practice, qualifying, and/or heat race participation forcing them to start at the rear of the field.

Additionally, during race weekend, historically practice and qualifying for the Coca-Cola 600 have taken place on Thursday before the race, with Carb Day at Indianapolis on Friday, and "Happy Hour" practice at Charlotte on Saturday before race day on Sunday leading to more travel. Presently NASCAR has reduced the Cup Series to 2-day shows, meaning practice & qualifying at Charlotte only takes place on Saturday relieving some, but not all travel burdens.

=== Itinerary ===
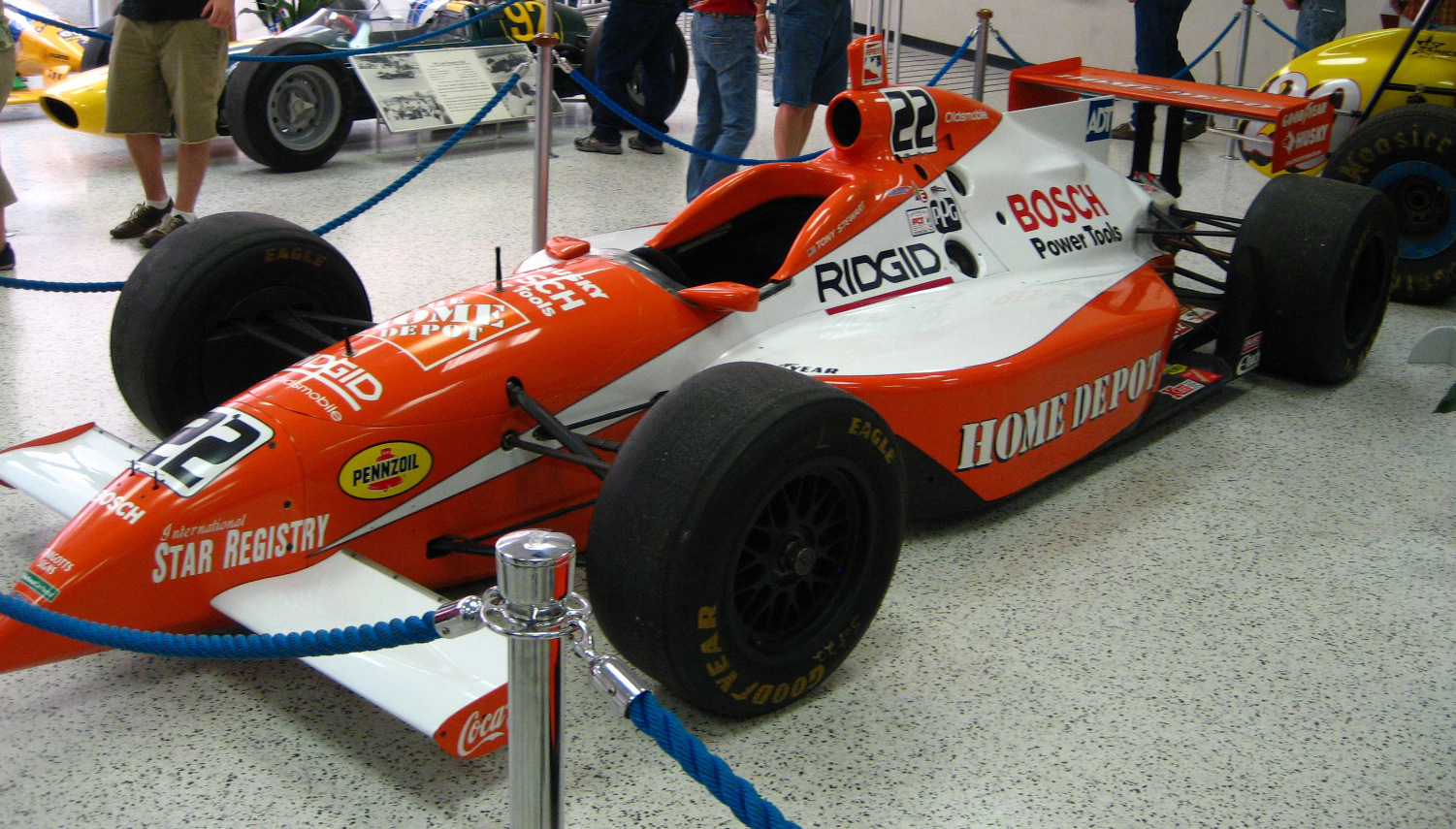
Tony Stewart's 1999 Indy car used in his "Double Duty" attempt.

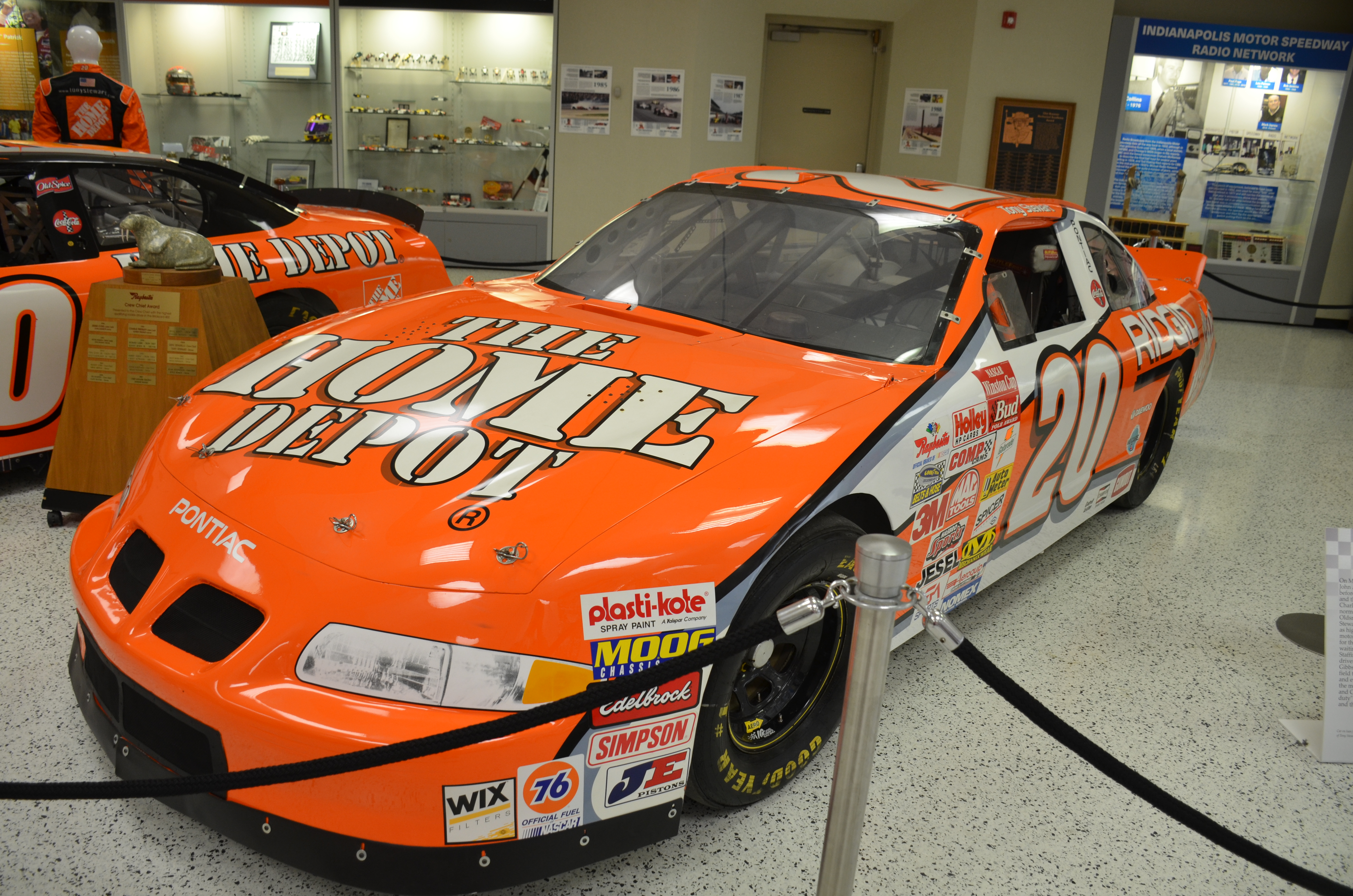
Tony Stewart's 1999 stock car used in his "Double Duty" attempt.

A driver attempting the "Double Duty" has an extremely busy and tight schedule, particularly for race day. The morning begins in Indianapolis, and at the conclusion of the Indy 500 (or if the driver potentially drops out of the race), they immediately travel from the Speedway (via helicopter or police escort) to a nearby airport – Eagle Creek, Indianapolis International, or another in the vicinity. The flight from Indianapolis to Concord Regional Airport aboard a private jet takes about 55 minutes. From there, the driver will board a helicopter to Charlotte Motor Speedway and land in the infield. Upon arriving at the Coca-Cola 600, the driver is escorted to their car.

The schedule and the logistics are planned well in advance, and even the slightest deviation can cause significant delay and force the driver to miss the second race. Weather can cause unexpected delay, and even force the effort to be aborted. Due to the complex nature of the scheduling, it is standard practice for the driver's respective teams to have back-up relief drivers standing by at both events, in case the schedule is compromised.

Depending upon which of the two events is considered the top priority, a "drop dead" departure time may be assigned at Indy. For 2025, this was 4:07 p.m. Eastern Time, with a "wheels up" (the time needed for the plane to Charlotte to take off) 23 minutes later at 4:30 p.m. According to NASCAR rules, the driver who starts the race in the car receives full championship points for that entry. (IndyCar was formerly the same way, but presently does not allow for relief drivers meaning if the driver has to leave the car is immediately retired from the race.) If the driver is a full-time competitor on the Cup Series circuit (and only part-time in IndyCar), the team may require the driver to leave Indy before that race is over in order to arrive at Charlotte on time and receive full points. Conversely, if the Indy 500 is the top priority, and that race is running long, the driver may choose to forgo or delay the trip to Charlotte, and assign the back-up driver to start the 600 instead.

NASCAR awards prize money directly to teams based on a complicated charter system regardless of driver. Formerly, if multiple drivers drove a single car at Indy, prize money was split based on the distance each driver completed, but at present driver changes are not allowed, meaning the car would be immediately retired if a driver left.

In 2001, Tony Stewart's "Double Duty" effort had the following published itinerary:

- 9:25 a.m. EST (10:25 a.m. EDT): Stewart at Indianapolis Motor Speedway.
- 9:50 a.m. EST (10:50 a.m. EDT): Stewart changes into his fire suit. Driver Richie Hearn standing by to drive relief if necessary.
- 10:15 a.m. EST (11:15 a.m. EDT): Driver introductions at the Indy 500.
- 11:00 a.m. EST (12:00 p.m. EDT): Start of Indianapolis 500.
- 2:30 p.m. EST (3:30 p.m. EDT): Indianapolis 500 completed, Stewart finishes 6th.
- 2:35 p.m. EST (3:35 p.m. EDT): Stewart rides a golf cart from pit area to the infield care center.
- 2:45 p.m. EST (3:45 p.m. EDT): Stewart boards a helicopter to Signature/Combs Flight Center at Indianapolis International Airport.
- 3:08 p.m. EST (4:08 p.m. EDT): Stewart leaves for Concord Regional Airport on a Citation Ten private jet. Stewart is administered two liters of IV fluids.
- 5:03 p.m. EDT: Plane lands at Concord Regional Airport.
- 5:10 p.m. EDT: Stewart changes clothes and boards helicopter to travel to Charlotte Motor Speedway.
- 5:20 p.m. EDT: The helicopter lands in the Charlotte Motor Speedway infield, in front of the start/finish line. Stewart waves to fans and climbs into his car. (The team had Mike McLaughlin ready if Stewart did not arrive in time.)
- 5:37 p.m. EDT: Starting command for Coca-Cola 600 given, Stewart's car is moved to 43rd (last) starting position as a penalty for missing the pre-race drivers' meeting.
- 5:45 p.m. EDT: Start of the Coca-Cola 600.
- 10:00 p.m. EDT: Coca-Cola 600 completed, Stewart finishes 3rd.

== "Cross-over" history (1960–1993) ==
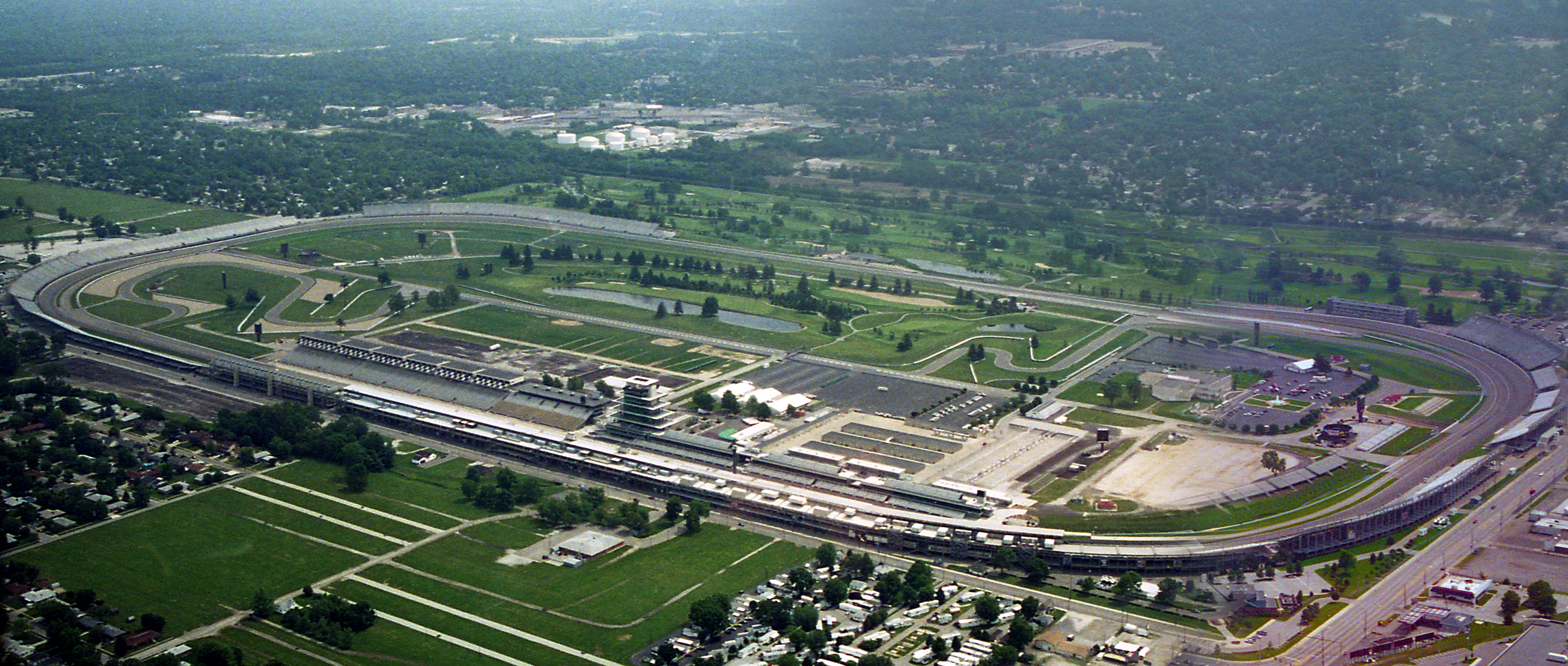
Indianapolis Motor Speedway

The Indianapolis 500 debuted in 1911, and from its onset, was scheduled in conjunction with Memorial Day. In 1960, Charlotte Motor Speedway was completed, and the inaugural World 600 was scheduled for Memorial Day weekend as well. However, for 1960, it was postponed until June 19 in order to ready the facility.

Starting in 1961, both Indy and Charlotte were scheduled around Memorial Day. Through the 1960s, the Indy 500 was normally scheduled for Memorial Day proper (May 30) regardless of the day of the week. When May 30 fell on a Sunday, the Indy 500 was moved to Monday May 31. At Charlotte, the World 600 was to be scheduled for the Sunday closest to Memorial Day. Thus for more than a decade, the two races were held on different days of the week. This prompted a handful of NASCAR regulars to attempt to race in the Indy 500. On a few occasions, drivers were able to "cross-over" and compete in both events, or skip the race at Charlotte in favor of Indy.

The NASCAR points system utilized at the time, as well as the structure of the schedule itself, differed substantially from modern times. The system was much more forgiving of drivers who missed a single race, which is why some drivers chose to skip Charlotte altogether.

In 1971, the Uniform Monday Holiday Act took effect, and began to alter the respective schedules for the races. Starting in 1974, the Indy 500 was permanently moved to the Sunday of Memorial Day weekend. Thus from 1974 to 1992, the races were scheduled for the same day, and at roughly the same starting time, prohibiting drivers from competing in both events. Furthermore, in 1975, the NASCAR points system was overhauled, and became much more unforgiving to drivers missing individual races. Very few NASCAR regulars would choose to skip Charlotte, which was emerging as one of the crown jewels on the Winston Cup calendar.

Starting in 1985, the World 600 secured the sponsorship of The Coca-Cola Company, and henceforth became known as the Coca-Cola 600.

=== 1963 ===
NASCAR regular Junior Johnson entered at Indy, but did not qualify. Curtis Turner passed a rookie test, but later crashed in practice.

=== 1965 ===
The World 600 is held on Sunday May 23, and the Indy 500 is held on Monday May 31. The NASCAR Wood Brothers pit crew were invited to Indy to service the Lotus-Ford entries of Jim Clark and Bobby Johns. Bobby Johns was a NASCAR semi-regular, and he skipped Charlotte to concentrate on Indy.

=== 1966 ===
NASCAR driver Cale Yarborough skips Charlotte and races at Indy. He finishes 28th. The Wood Brothers pit crew returned for a second year, but the car they were to service (Dan Gurney), crashed out on the first lap.

=== 1967 ===
The World 600 is held on Sunday May 28, and the Indy 500 is scheduled for Tuesday May 30. NASCAR driver LeeRoy Yarbrough skips Charlotte and races at Indy. He finishes 27th, having been involved in three separate spins. Cale Yarborough becomes the first driver to compete in both races in the same year. He dropped out with broken steering and finished 41st at Charlotte. At Indy he placed 17th, spinning out once, and crashing out late in the race.

A rain delay caused the Indy 500 to be held over two days, May 30–31.

=== 1968 ===
The World 600 is held on Sunday May 26, and the Indy 500 is held Thursday May 30. Jerry Grant becomes the second driver to compete in both races in the same year. He finished 12th at Charlotte and 23rd at Indy.

=== 1969 ===
The World 600 is held on Sunday May 25, and the Indy 500 is held Friday May 30. NASCAR driver Lee Roy Yarbrough won the race at Charlotte and finished 23rd at Indy. Charlie Glotzbach, a NASCAR regular, entered at Indy, but failed to qualify.

=== 1970 ===
The World 600 is held on Sunday May 24, and the Indy 500 is held Saturday May 30. NASCAR driver Donnie Allison won the race at Charlotte, and finished 4th at Indy. To date, it is the best combined performance for both races. Lee Roy Yarbrough also competed in both events. He finished 29th at Charlotte and 19th at Indy.

The day after Indy (Sunday May 31), Yarbrough flew to Martinsville to race in the Virginia 500. He dropped out and finished 26th. For the second year in a row, Charlie Glotzbach (who finished 25th at Charlotte) entered, but failed to qualify at Indy.

=== 1971 ===
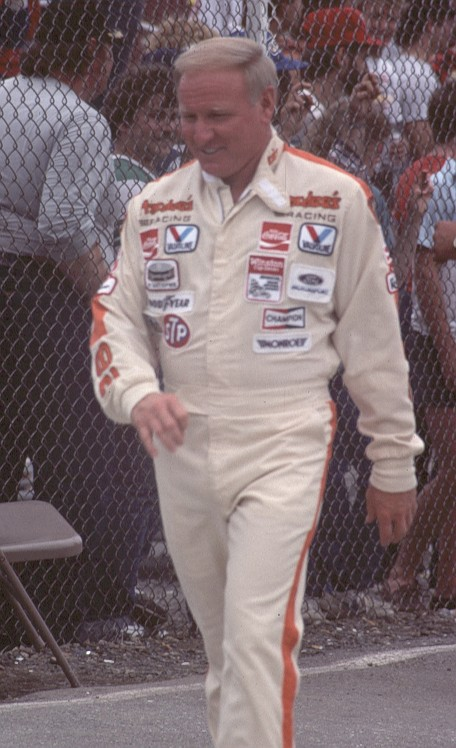
Cale Yarborough

Memorial Day is moved to Monday, and the Indy 500 is held Saturday May 29. The World 600 is held the very next day, Sunday May 30. NASCAR driver Donnie Allison finished 6th at Indy on Saturday, and finished 2nd at the race at Charlotte. Cale Yarborough skipped Charlotte, and managed to finish 16th at Indy. Sunday night, Donnie Allison flew back to Indianapolis in time to attend the 500 Victory Banquet.

=== 1972 ===
The races are held on successive days again, but no drivers attempt to race in both. Cale Yarborough skipped Charlotte once again, and finish 10th at Indy.

=== 1973 ===
Charlotte is held on Sunday May 27, while Indy is scheduled for Monday May 28. Due to rain, the Indy 500 is not held until Wednesday May 30. Bobby Allison skipped Charlotte and raced at Indy for the first time.

=== 1974 ===
The two events are held on the same day for the first time, with roughly the same start time. No drivers attempt a "cross over."

=== 1975 ===
Bobby Allison skipped Charlotte and raced at Indy. This would be the final time during this era that a noteworthy NASCAR regular did a "cross over" to the Indy 500.

=== 1976 ===
Rookie Janet Guthrie made a highly publicized attempt to qualify at the Indy 500. However, she was not able to get her car up to speed and did not make a qualifying attempt. After creating a media stir, and with the spotlight still on her, she quickly found herself an alternative. Promoter Humpy Wheeler consummated a deal for Guthrie to acquire a car from NASCAR owner Ralph Moody, and within 48 hours, flew her to Charlotte to qualify instead for the World 600. Guthrie started 27th and finished 15th. It was her first NASCAR Winston Cup Series start.

=== 1979 ===
NASCAR regular Neil Bonnett entered at Indy looking to qualify. He was up to speed, however, he suffered a blown engine on the morning of pole qualifying. The following weekend, rain complicated his schedule, and he decided to withdraw from Indy.

=== 1980 ===
Future NASCAR star Tim Richmond, who started his professional driving career in Indy cars, won the Rookie of the Year Award at Indianapolis.

=== 1983 ===
Future NASCAR driver Ken Schrader entered at Indy. He crashed during practice and failed to qualify.

== Double Duty history (1994–2026) ==
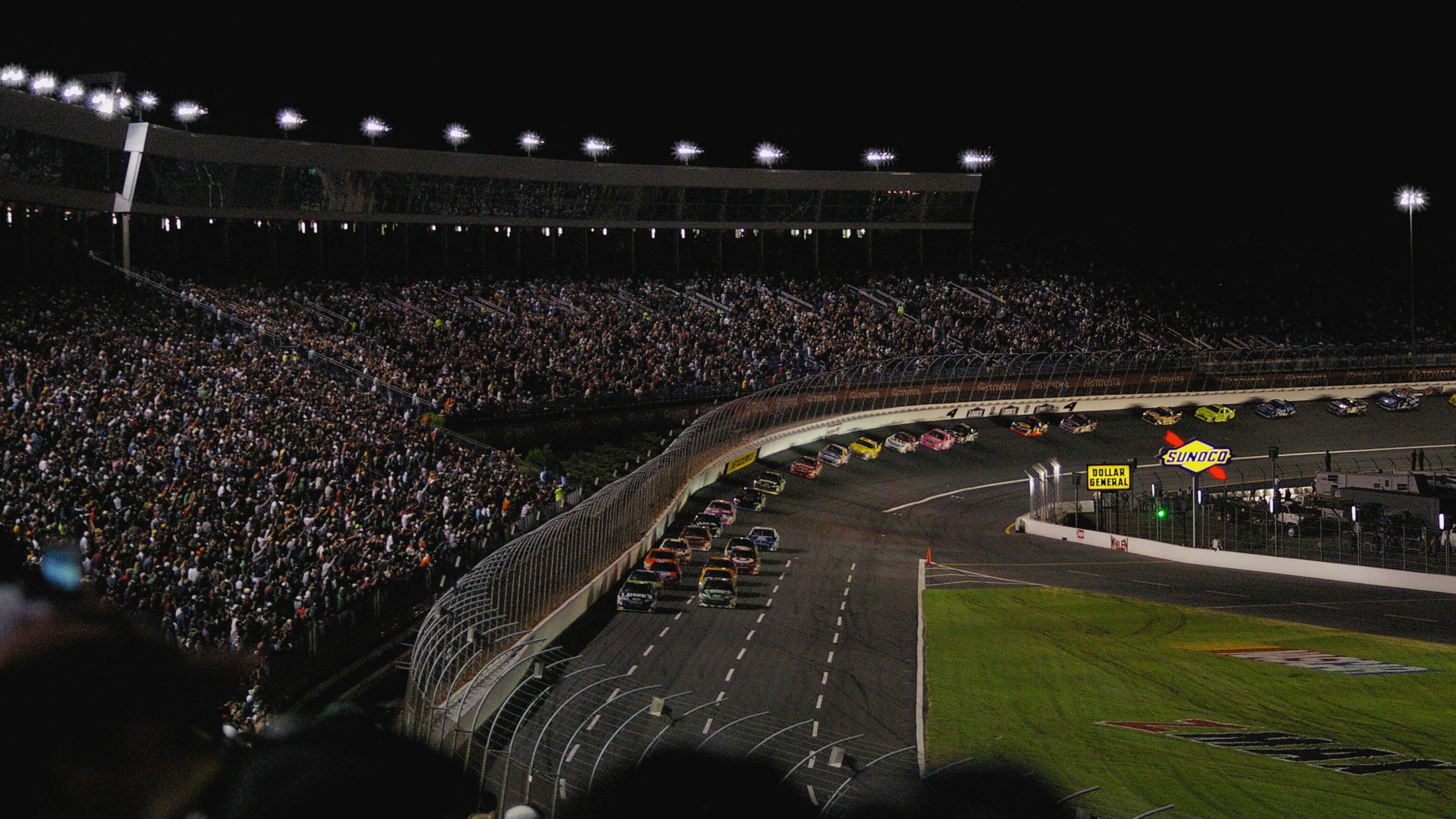
Night racing was introduced at Charlotte Motor Speedway starting in 1992.

In 1992, Musco Lighting Company installed lights at Charlotte Motor Speedway, becoming the first "speedway" to allow for night racing. For 1992, The Winston was held under-the-lights, but the Coca-Cola 600 was still held during the afternoon. In 1993, the start time for the Coca-Cola 600 was moved to 4:30 p.m. eastern, which eliminated overlap with the Indy 500, and the race became an evening/night race. The 4:30 p.m. start time did not yet allow adequate time for a competitor to complete both, but the idea was planted, and subsequent years, the start time for the 600 was moved later, and a travel window would open up.

=== 1994 ===
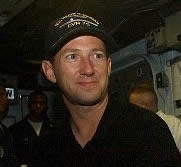
John Andretti was the first driver to attempt "Double Duty" in 1994.

IndyCar veteran John Andretti switched full-time to the NASCAR Winston Cup Series starting in 1994, but desired to also compete in the Indy 500. Andretti announced that he would become the first driver ever to attempt to drive in both the Indy 500 and Coca-Cola 600 in the same day. Andretti successfully qualified for both events, and planned a detailed travel itinerary. On race day, Andretti got off to a good start early on. He was running as high as third at Indianapolis during the first half of the race. At the checkered flag, Andretti finished 10th at Indy. He then immediately boarded a helicopter to the airport. He flew to Charlotte, and arrived in just enough time to make the start for the Coca-Cola 600. Since Andretti missed the pre-race drivers' meeting, he was forced to start at the back of the field at Charlotte. He dropped out on lap 220 with engine failure, and finished 36th.

Later in the year, Andretti raced in the Inaugural Brickyard 400. Indy 500 veterans Danny Sullivan, A. J. Foyt, and Geoff Brabham also qualified for the event. But Andretti became the first driver to compete in both events in the same season.

=== 1995 ===
IndyCar veteran Davy Jones announced plans to attempt the "Double Duty." He qualified at Indy, but failed to qualify at Charlotte.

=== 1996 ===
No drivers or teams expressed interest in attempting the double in 1996. Meanwhile, the open wheel "split" was the focus of the month at Indy.

=== 1997 ===
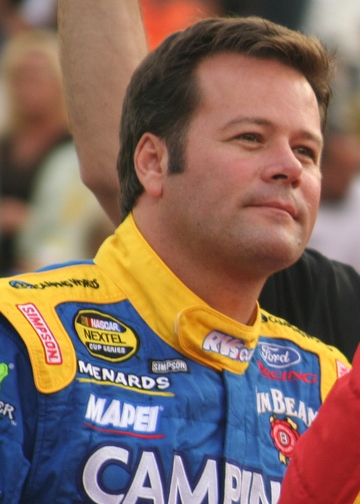
Robby Gordon has attempted "Double Duty" five times.

IndyCar veteran Robby Gordon switched full-time to NASCAR for 1997. Driving for the Felix Sabates SABCO Racing team, he was entered in both races, a highly funded, and highly publicized effort. On race day, however, the Indy 500 was rained out, and the opportunity for the true "Double Duty" was eliminated. Gordon departed the grounds, and went directly to Charlotte when the postponement was announced. Gordon finished 41st at Charlotte after a crash. On Monday, Gordon flew back to Indy, and started the race. The race was halted on lap 15 due to rain, and the conclusion was pushed into Tuesday. On Tuesday, Gordon dropped out early with a fire, and finished 29th.

=== 1998 ===
No drivers attempted the "Double Duty," but one crew member worked both races. Dale Earnhardt's gasman Danny "Chocolate" Myers was invited to also serve as the fueler for Billy Boat's car at A.J. Foyt Racing.

=== 1999 ===
Tony Stewart, an IRL regular from 1996 to 1998, switched to the NASCAR Winston Cup Series for the 1999 season. He arranged to attempt "Double Duty" for the first time in 1999. On pole day at Indy, Stewart had to make his qualifying attempt, then quickly fly to Charlotte in order to participate in the Winston Open. He was forced to take a fairly slow speed in time trials, and ended up qualifying 24th at Indy. That evening, Stewart won the Winston Open, and finished second in the main event, The Winston. On race day, Stewart finished 9th at the Indy 500, but was not much of a factor. At Charlotte, he led laps, and finished 4th.

Robby Gordon and Roberto Moreno became the first two drivers to compete in a CART event and then at the Indianapolis 500 on consecutive days. The Motorola 300 at Gateway was held on Saturday May 29. Moreno finished 4th, and Gordon crashed and finished 27th. On Sunday May 30, Gordon and Moreno both returned to Indy. Gordon nearly won, running out of fuel just shy of the white flag. He ended up 4th. Moreno dropped out and finished 20th.

=== 2000 ===
Robby Gordon attempted "Double Duty" for the second time. On race day, rain delayed the start of the Indy 500 by three hours. Gordon remained at Indianapolis, and started the race as planned. He finished 6th, and back-up driver P. J. Jones started his car at Charlotte instead. After the Indy 500 was over, Gordon flew to Charlotte, and during a pit stop, took over the car from Jones. He drove the car to a 35th-place finish.

Three other drivers competed in multiple events during the weekend. Juan Pablo Montoya and Jimmy Vasser participated in the CART Bosch Spark Plug Grand Prix at Nazareth Speedway on Saturday, the day before the Indy 500. Montoya finished 4th, and Vasser 7th. Also on Saturday, Jason Leffler traveled to Charlotte to participate in the NASCAR Busch Series Carquest Auto Parts 300. Leffler finished 21st at Charlotte. All three were back to Indy on Sunday.

=== 2001 ===
For the second time, Tony Stewart decided to attempt "Double Duty." Still part of Joe Gibbs Racing in NASCAR, he signed with Chip Ganassi Racing for Indy. On race day, Stewart was a factor all day, leading 13 laps. Despite a brief rain shower, the race did not have a significant delay. Stewart wound up finishing 6th at Indy, on the lead lap. He immediately departed for Charlotte, and made it to the track in just enough time. Starting last due to missing the drivers' meeting, Stewart spun out on lap 2, but claimed it was not due to fatigue. As the race continued, Stewart climbed up the standings, and finished third, on the lead lap. He became the first, and to date, only driver to complete all 1,100 miles of both races in the same day.

=== 2002 ===
Robby Gordon attempted "Double Duty" for the third time, and for the first time, rain did not interfere with his effort. At Indy, he finished 8th on the lead lap. At Charlotte, he started last (due to missing the drivers' meeting), but worked his way up to the top five. He started suffering from handling problems, and cramps in his leg, and he fell two laps down. He made up one lap, and finished 16th. At the end of the day, he was one lap short of completing the entire 1,100 miles.

=== 2003 ===
Robby Gordon attempted "Double Duty" for the fourth time. He qualified on the front row at Indy, but dropped out with gearbox trouble (22nd place). Due to his early retirement, and with adequate time, Gordon received a police escort by car to the airport instead of a helicopter ride. At Charlotte, Gordon was running 17th when the race was called for rain on lap 276 of 400 (414 miles). A week after race day, ESPN aired a one-hour documentary profiling the effort.

=== 2004 ===
For the third year in a row and fifth time overall, Robby Gordon attempted "Double Duty." On race day, rain delayed the start of the Indy 500 by two hours. Gordon started the race as planned. On lap 27, the red flag came out for rain, and the race was halted. It appeared that the rest of the day would likely be a washout, so Gordon departed for Charlotte. After another two hours, the track dried, and the race resumed. Jaques Lazier was standing by, and climbed in Gordon's car to drive relief. He worked his way up the standings, but dropped out on lap 88 with a broken axle. Meanwhile, at Charlotte, Gordon finished 20th, three laps down.

On Bump Day (May 23), Tony Stewart created a stir when he made an unexpected visit to the Speedway. After finishing third the previous night in the NEXTEL All-Star Challenge, Stewart was seen in the Foyt garages climbing into a car and at one point even donned a driver's suit. The car was wheeled to the pits and it appeared Stewart was preparing to take practice laps. Members of the media converged, and rumors began buzzing around the track about a possible "Double Duty" attempt. Stewart awaited permission from his sponsors to drive the car, but no deal could be arranged. A. J. Foyt and Stewart were given the dubious "Jigger Award" for pumping life into an otherwise uneventful day.

=== 2005–2012 ===
In 2005, the start time for the Indy 500 was moved to 12 p.m. EST (1 p.m. EDT), which significantly reduced the amount of time available for travel between the events. From 2005 to 2010, the time frame was deemed insufficient, and despite various rumors of possible attempts over the years, the opportunity to perform "Double Duty" was effectively on hiatus.

During this period, while no drivers attempted to compete in both races, some drivers and owners attended both races in whole or in part. In 2006, Penske Racing's Kurt Busch was in attendance at Indianapolis the morning of the race and watched the start of the 500 as a guest of Team Penske. Shortly after, he flew to Charlotte to arrive in time for the drivers meeting, and raced in the 600. In 2007, Richard Petty watched the start of the Indy 500, along with Robbie Loomis and Dale Inman. They then flew to Charlotte to attend the 600. Car owner Chip Ganassi was also scheduled to attend both races, but due to a mid-race rain delay, remained at Indy. In 2010, Ganassi won at Indy with driver Dario Franchitti, then later flew to Charlotte to take in the second half of the 600. His driver Jamie McMurray finished second in the 600.

For 2011, the start time for the Indy 500 was moved back to 12 noon EDT, which effectively re-opened the travel window and made it possible to attempt "Double Duty" once again. Rumors began to surface that drivers (namely Robby Gordon) were interested in making the attempt. NASCAR regulars Jimmie Johnson and Kasey Kahne also reportedly expressed interest, and a rumor of a $20 million award for winning both races circulated. No plans ever materialized. A year later, despite some rumors about possibly doing the double in 2012, Danica Patrick also nixed plans to compete in both races.

=== 2013 ===
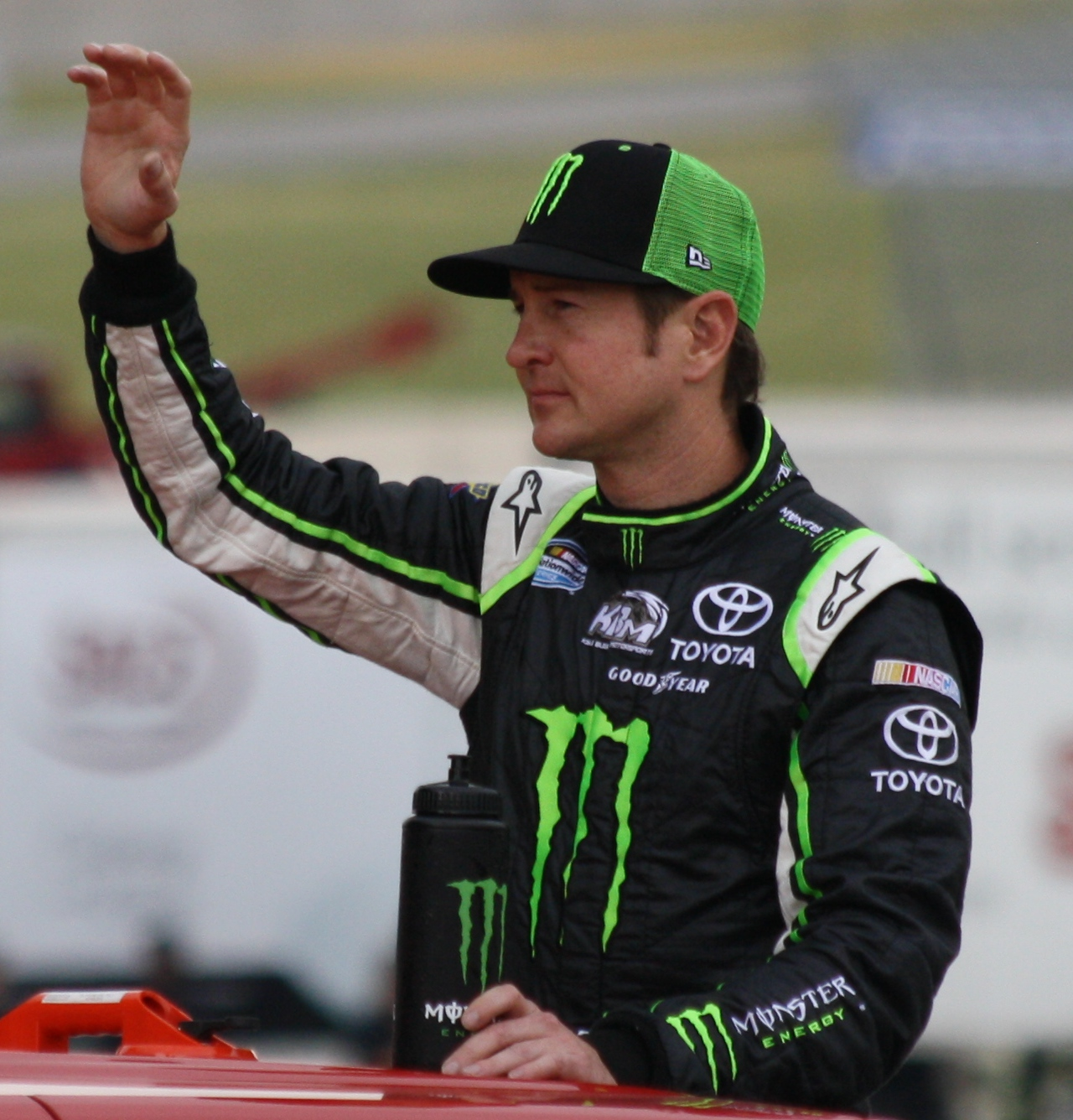
Kurt Busch

In early May 2013, 2004 NASCAR Nextel Cup Series champion Kurt Busch tested for Andretti Autosport at Indianapolis, opening up the possibility of a "Double Duty" attempt in 2014. During the private test, Busch reached a top lap of 218 mph. Busch successfully passed his initial rookie test for the Indianapolis 500.

=== 2014 ===
On March 4, 2014, it was announced that Kurt Busch would attempt "Double Duty" with Andretti Autosport. The effort was done in-part to help raise awareness for military veterans with PTSD and TBI. Busch took part in a refresher test on April 29, and a week later participated in the annual Rookie Orientation Program. Busch led the speed chart on Rookie Orientation day, then posted the second-fastest speed on May 13.

On May 17, the first day of time trials, Busch made two qualifying attempts, and posted the 10th-fastest speed, just missing the Fast Nine Shootout. Just moments after his second attempt, he boarded a helicopter and then flew to Charlotte to compete in the NASCAR Sprint All-Star Race. Busch finished 11th in the All-Star Race, then flew back to Indianapolis for the second day of time trials. On May 18, Busch qualified for the 12th starting position for the Indy 500. On Monday, Busch participated in the post-qualifying practice session at Indy. About an hour and a half into the session, he suffered a hard crash in the exit of turn two. He was uninjured but forced to switch to a backup car for Carb Day and race day.

On race day at Indianapolis, Busch started 12th, and fell back to as low as 20th. Although he was not a factor for the win, he finished on the lead lap in 6th and was the highest-finishing rookie. He tied with Robby Gordon and Tony Stewart as the three drivers to finish 6th, the best Indianapolis finish for Double Duty drivers. Busch arrived in Charlotte with time to spare, but was still required to start at the rear of the field due to missing the mandatory pre-race driver's meeting. He ran as high as the top 15, but ultimately failed to finish with a mid-race engine failure. He completed a total of 906 miles (1,458 km) of racing. Busch was named the Indy 500 Rookie of the Year. Busch's effort was documented on the NBCSN series 36.

=== 2015–2023 ===
Indiana native Jeff Gordon, during his last Cup Series season, drove the pace car at the start of the 2015 Indianapolis 500 before flying to Charlotte for the Coca-Cola 600. He has never competed in the Indy 500, although he did win the Brickyard 400 five times.

In 2015, Doug Rice, the anchor of the Performance Racing Network, as well as the anchor for the Brickyard 400 on the IMS Radio Network, joined the broadcast crew as a pit reporter for the Indy 500. Rice performed broadcasting "double duty", working the pits for the Indy 500, then flying to Charlotte Motor Speedway to call the Coca-Cola 600 later that evening. He is believed to be the first broadcaster to cover both races in-person on the same day.

For 2016, 2017, 2018 and 2019, despite some very early rumors, no drivers attempted double duty at Indy and Charlotte.

In 2020, the COVID-19 pandemic caused the Indianapolis 500 to be moved from May to August while the Coca-Cola 600 remained on its scheduled date. While it was consequently possible for a driver to compete in both races, the rescheduled Indy 500 date fell on the same day as a Cup race at Dover International Speedway, making it impossible to run both races. James Davison skipped the practice session at Indy following the Fast 9 Shootout to compete in that day's Go Bowling 235 Cup race at the Daytona Road Course. Complications from the pandemic extended into 2021 as the Indianapolis 500 qualifying clashed with the Cup Series' Texas Grand Prix. In order to compete at both COTA and the Indy 500, NASCAR drivers would have had to sacrifice practice time at both events. In addition, the race at COTA started almost immediately after the Fast 9 Shootout at Indy, ruling out a pole run. Davison and Cup teammate Cody Ware initially entered the Indy 500 but opted to remain in NASCAR and run the 600, though the latter was due to a lack of sponsorship.

=== 2024 ===
On January 12, 2023, it was announced that Kyle Larson would attempt Double Duty on May 26, 2024, entering the Indianapolis 500 for Arrow McLaren, and the Cola–Cola 600 for Hendrick Motorsports.

Because of the Indy 500's qualifying schedule, Larson missed the NASCAR All-Star Race heat races on Saturday afternoon (May 18) at North Wilkesboro Speedway. The recently retired Kevin Harvick filled in for Larson. (Harvick was still eligible for the All-Star race in his own right). Larson flew back to North Carolina from Indianapolis late Sunday afternoon after qualifying for fifth place on the Indy 500 starting grid, and got to North Wilkesboro in time for the All-Star race, after NASCAR adjusted the start time to accommodate him. During the days leading up to the 500, retired driver Tony Kanaan was rumored as a possible replacement driver for Larson at the "500" in case of weather issues. Nolan Siegel was later announced as the stand-by driver (but he was not used).

On race day, due to rain, the start of the Indianapolis 500 was delayed by four hours. Larson elected to stay in Indianapolis and drive the full race. He finished 18th, suffering a pit road speed limit penalty during the second half, which essentially took him out of contention. Justin Allgaier was standing by as a relief driver in Charlotte and started the Coca-Cola 600 in Larson's car. Allgaier drove the first 249 laps (of 400) in his place. Larson arrived at Charlotte just as a weather delay (rain and lightning) halted the race on lap 249. Larson was preparing to take over the car if and when the race was resumed. However, the race was eventually called official by NASCAR due to difficulty of track drying from high humidity and the potential of racing late into the early hours of morning.

Additionally, Jimmie Johnson was scheduled to be part of the NBC broadcast team for the Indianapolis 500, and then was to fly to Charlotte to race in the Coca-Cola 600. However, he opted to only race in the 600 due to the weather in Indianapolis. He would have become the first person to announce one race and drive in the other on the same day.

=== 2025 ===
On September 10, 2024, it was announced that Kyle Larson will once again attempt the Indianapolis 500 with Arrow McLaren, and the Coca-Cola 600 with Hendrick Motorsports, in 2025. Larson crashed out of the Indianapolis 500 on the 92nd lap. Had Larson not crashed, he would not have been able to complete the race and reach Charlotte in time for the Coca-Cola 600; the Indy race had been delayed by intermittent rain showers, pushing start time to 1:29 p.m, with eventual winner Alex Palou not crossing the finish line until 4:26 p.m., 19 minutes after Larson's hard limit time. Tony Kanaan served as stand-by driver. Larson pressed forward with plans to race in Charlotte that night. At the Coca-Cola 600, after recovering from a spinout on lap 42, Larson collided with Daniel Suarez's car on lap 245 and withdrew after the damage proved too much to repair, resulting in the first Double Duty DNF since Robby Gordon in 1997, and first to occur on the same day. After the race, Larson indicated that he would be interested in racing the Indianapolis 500 again but determined that Double Duty would be nearly impossible to pull off because of the time constraints, noting that exhaustion from the Indy race attempt affected his performance in Charlotte.

Additionally, semi-retired driver Jimmie Johnson drove retired NFL player Tom Brady one lap around Indianapolis Motor Speedway in a specially built two-seat IndyCar prior to the start of the 500 before flying to Charlotte to make his 700th career start in the NASCAR Cup Series.

=== 2026 ===
On May 13, 2026, it was announced that a last minute deal would allow Katherine Legge to attempt the double with Chevrolet. She drove the No. 11 for HMD Motorsports/AJ Foyt Racing in the Indianapolis 500 and the No. 78 for Live Fast Motorsports in the Coca-Cola 600. She was the sixth driver in history to take part in both races, the first woman, the first non-American, and the oldest driver to make the attempt. Legge was taken out by Ryan Hunter-Reay's spin resulting in him hitting the wall in front of her on the 18th lap, crediting her with the 33rd place finish. She proceeded with plans to race the Coca-Cola 600. The Coca-Cola 600 was rained out after 373 laps; Legge finished the race, despite losing a tire and being penalized, causing her to go many laps down to finish in 31st place finish. Legge thereby completed 585 of the 1,100 miles of the Double.

== Race results ==
The Indianapolis 500 is scheduled for 200 laps (500 miles) with 33 starting drivers (the lone post-1994 exception was 1997). The Coca-Cola 600 is scheduled for 400 laps (600 miles) and 43 (1994 to 2015) or 36 to 41 (2016-present) starting drivers.

Year	Driver	Indianapolis 500 results				Coca-Cola 600 results			
Year	Driver	Team	Laps	Finish	Report	Team	Laps	Finish	Report
1994	(United States) John Andretti	A. J. Foyt Enterprises	196	10th	Report	Hagan Racing	220	36th	Report
1995	(United States) Davy Jones	Dick Simon Racing	161	23rd	Report	Jasper Motorsports	—	DNQ	Report
1997	(United States) Robby Gordon	SABCO Racing	19	29th	Report	SABCO Racing	186 (of 333)	41st	Report
1999	(United States) Tony Stewart	TriStar Motorsports	196	9th	Report	Joe Gibbs Racing	400	4th	Report
2000	(United States) Robby Gordon	Team Menard	200	6th	Report	Team Menard	389	35th*	Report
2001	(United States) Tony Stewart	Chip Ganassi Racing	200	6th	Report	Joe Gibbs Racing	400	3rd	Report
2002	(United States) Robby Gordon	Team Menard/RCR	200	8th	Report	Richard Childress Racing	399	16th	Report
2003	(United States) Robby Gordon	Andretti Green Racing	169	22nd	Report	Richard Childress Racing	275 (of 276)	17th	Report
2004	(United States) Robby Gordon	Robby Gordon Motorsports	88 (of 180)	29th*	Report	Richard Childress Racing	397	20th	Report
2014	(United States) Kurt Busch	Andretti Autosport	200	6th	Report	Stewart–Haas Racing	271	40th	Report
2024	(United States) Kyle Larson	Arrow McLaren	200	18th	Report	Hendrick Motorsports	—	DNS*	Report
2025	(United States) Kyle Larson	Arrow McLaren	91	24th*	Report	Hendrick Motorsports	245	37th	Report
2026	(United Kingdom) Katherine Legge	HMD Motorsports/A. J. Foyt Racing	17	33rd	Report	Live Fast Motorsports	361 (of 373)	31st	Report

Rain delays:

- 1997: The Indianapolis 500, which had been postponed to Monday due to rain, was suspended on lap 15 because of rain, before resuming the following day. Coca-Cola 600 suspended by rain on Lap 194, and curtailed by curfew after 333 laps.
- 2000: The Indianapolis 500 start was delayed 3:09 by rain. At the Coca-Cola 600, P. J. Jones started and drove until the suspension of race on Lap 254 for weather, officially credited with race points. Robby Gordon drove without official credit upon resumption of the race.
- 2004: The Indianapolis 500, whose start had been delayed by two hours because of rain, was suspended on Lap 29 for 1:47 by rain. During the suspension, Jaques Lazier took over during a rain delay and drove the final 61 laps, before the race was curtailed after 180 laps due to a tornado in the area. By series rule, Robby Gordon is credited with participation.
- 2024: The Indianapolis 500 start was delayed 3:59 by rain. At the Coca-Cola 600, Justin Allgaier started and drove until the suspension on Lap 249 for weather. The race did not resume because of track drying issues and the late hour. No driver was credited with race points, as Allgaier, who drove the entire race, is ineligible for Cup Series points. However, Allgaier's performance officially scored the No. 5 team with 13th place owner's points.
- 2025: The Indianapolis 500 start was delayed 45 minutes after the end of the pre-race ceremonies because of light rain showers.

Source: RacingReference.info & IndianapolisMotorSpeedway.com

=== Statistics and records ===
- Best combined results for both races
  - 6th at Indianapolis and 3rd at Charlotte, Tony Stewart (2001)
- Most combined laps/miles completed for both races: 600 laps / 1,100 miles (Tony Stewart, 2001)
- Best individual Indianapolis 500 result
  - 6th: Robby Gordon (2000)
  - 6th: Tony Stewart (2001)
  - 6th: Kurt Busch (2014)
- Best individual Coca-Cola 600 result
  - 3rd: Tony Stewart (2001)

== Other uses of the term ==
=== Indianapolis 500 and Grand Prix of Monaco ===
During the 1960s and 1970s, a handful of drivers raced at the Indianapolis 500 while maintaining a full-time schedule in Formula One. This would require them to travel between Indianapolis and Europe during the month of May, usually between Indy and the Monaco Grand Prix at Monte Carlo, two of the three components of the Triple Crown of Motorsport. For many years, Indy and Monaco were not held on the same day. Furthermore, prior to 1971, the Indy 500 was held on May 30 regardless of the day of the week (unless it fell on a Sunday, in which case it was scheduled for Monday May 31). With the Indy 500 often falling on a weekday, and Monaco usually held on a Sunday a week or two prior, travel burdens were relatively workable.

Racing at both Indy and Monaco in the same year became mostly impossible after Indy was moved to race on Sunday starting in 1974, and Monaco likewise was eventually moved to the last Sunday in May (same day as Indy), ending just a couple hours before the green flag dropped at Indianapolis.

In 2021, Monaco ran the weekend before the Indianapolis 500. Some questioned if Fernando Alonso, who had attempted to qualify for Indy in three of the past four runnings would attempt double duty. However, in addition to scheduling conflicts with Monaco and Indy 500 qualifying, Alonso's contract with Renault (rebranded Alpine F1 Team after his signing) specifically forbade an Indianapolis 500 attempt due to safety concerns.

Beginning in 2026, the Monaco Grand Prix will move from its May date to the first full weekend in June.

=== Same weekend races ===
There are other lesser, informal uses of the term "Double Duty" in context to motorsports. Namely instances where a driver competes in two major races on the same day or on successive days. This occurs in a fairly regular fashion in NASCAR, where a driver (often numerous drivers) compete in the Xfinity Series and Cup Series events, or even Craftsman Truck Series races; this practice is widely known as "Buschwhacking" (in reference to the Xfinity Series' then-title sponsor Busch beer). However, in most cases, the multiple events take place at the same venue, diminishing the complexity of the feat. At times, some drivers even raced the entire NASCAR Cup and entire Xfinity schedule, which included some travel between cities for a handful of weekends where the two series were at different venues.

On rare occasions, there have been situations in which an Xfinity Series race became rained out, and was rescheduled for the day of the NASCAR Cup race. This occurred the weekend of the 2007 Winn-Dixie 250 and Pepsi 400 at Daytona, and the 2010 spring weekend at Talladega, with the Aaron's 312 happening after the Aaron's 499. In the later case, the resulting distance was over 851 miles distance traveled, as both races were extended by green-white-checkered finishes. In the latter, Kevin Harvick and Jamie McMurray were the top two cars at the white flag for both races; Harvick won the Cup race by a bumper over McMurray, and McMurray started the big one as Brad Keselowski snuck by Harvick for the win during the Xfinity Series race.

Similarly, double duty has occurred in instances where a NASCAR driver also takes part in a support race (namely Grand Am), but seldom attempted when the races were at different tracks. This is more prevalent at road courses such as Watkins Glen or Sonoma. Another example of this is at Daytona, where the Paul Revere 250 was held the same day as the Firecracker 400 numerous times, and several drivers competed in both.

Another short-lived "double duty" occurred between the Indianapolis 500 and IMSA. A few drivers, Geoff Brabham, Kevin Cogan, and Rocky Moran, competed at Indy on Sunday, and at Lime Rock on Monday.

In 2020, due to scheduling changes resulting from the COVID-19 pandemic, the IndyCar Series announced that it would hold its GMR Grand Prix road course race on July 4, as part of a double-header with the Xfinity Series Pennzoil 150 (which, for the 2020 season, was moved from the oval to the road course as well), a support race for the Cup Series Brickyard 400. A USAC dirt track event known as the Driven2SaveLives BC39 is also held during the Brickyard 400 week, leading Tony Stewart (who has occasionally participated in dirt track events) to envision the theoretical possibility of racing all four events. Stewart ended up not attempting any races, citing financial challenges and lack of fan attendance due to the pandemic. The dirt event was also subsequently cancelled.

== Footnotes ==
=== Works cited ===
- Indianapolis 500 History: Race & All-Time Stats - official site
- 1970 Indianapolis 500 Radio Broadcast: Indianapolis Motor Speedway Radio Network
