= Sam Hornish Jr. =

American racing driver (born 1979)

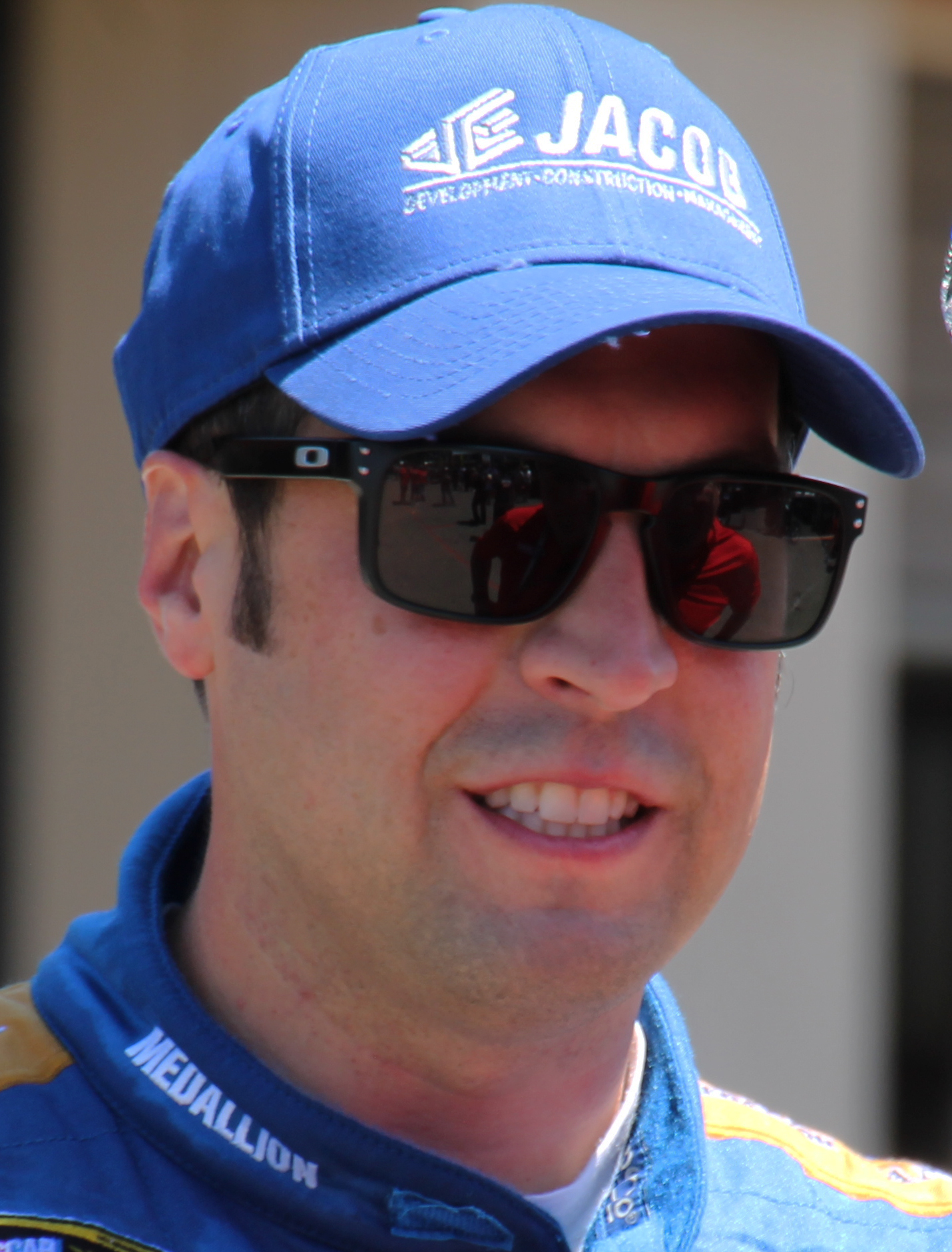
- Hornish in 2015
- Nationality: (United States) American
- Born: Samuel Jon Hornish Jr. July 2, 1979 (age 47); Archbold, Ohio, U.S.
- Achievements: 2001, 2002, 2006 IndyCar Series champion 2006 Indianapolis 500 winner
- Awards: 1999 Atlantic Championship Rookie of the Year; 2004 IndyCar Series Most Popular Driver; 2006 Scott Brayton Award; U.S. F2000 National Championship Hall of Fame Inductee (2012)

IndyCar Series career
- 116 races run over 8 years
- Teams: PDM Racing (2000); Panther Racing (2001–2003); Team Penske (2004–2007)
- Best finish: 1st (2001, 2002, 2006)
- First race: 2000 Delphi Indy 200 (Walt Disney World)
- Last race: 2007 Peak Antifreeze Indy 300 (Chicagoland)
- First win: 2001 Pennzoil Copper World Indy 200 (Phoenix)
- Last win: 2007 Bombardier Learjet 550 (Texas)
| Wins | Podiums | Poles |
|---|---|---|
| 19 | 47 | 12 |

NASCAR Cup Series career
- 167 races run over 9 years
- 2015 position: 26th
- Best finish: 26th (2015)
- First race: 2007 Checker Auto Parts 500 Presented by Pennzoil (Phoenix)
- Last race: 2015 Ford EcoBoost 400 (Homestead)
| Wins | Top tens | Poles |
|---|---|---|
| 0 | 12 | 0 |

NASCAR O'Reilly Auto Parts Series career
- 120 races run over 11 years
- 2017 position: 31st
- Best finish: 2nd (2013)
- First race: 2006 Arizona Travel 200 (Phoenix)
- Last race: 2017 Ford EcoBoost 300 (Homestead)
- First win: 2011 WYPALL* 200 Powered by Kimberly-Clark Professional (Phoenix)
- Last win: 2017 Mid-Ohio Challenge (Mid-Ohio)
| Wins | Top tens | Poles |
|---|---|---|
| 5 | 64 | 9 |

NASCAR FedEx Freight Truck Series career
- 1 race run over 1 year
- Best finish: 74th (2008)
- First race: 2008 Kroger 200 (Martinsville)
- Last race: 2008 Kroger 200 (Martinsville)
| Wins | Top tens | Poles |
|---|---|---|
| 0 | 1 | 0 |
- Statistics up to date as of November 18, 2017.

Samuel Jon Hornish Jr. (born July 2, 1979) is an American semi-retired professional auto racing driver who competed in the IndyCar Series, where he won three championships and the Indianapolis 500, and later in the NASCAR Cup Series.

Hornish began his top-tier racing career in the IndyCar Series, making his driving debut during the 2000 season for PDM Racing. Hornish began driving for Panther Racing the following season, winning eleven races and the 2001 and 2002 series championships over the next three seasons. During the 2004 season Hornish began driving for Team Penske, winning eight more races (including the 2006 Indianapolis 500) and the 2006 series championship during his time with the team. When he left the series after the 2007 season, he held the record for most career wins in the series (19, broken by Scott Dixon in 2009).

Hornish moved to Penske's NASCAR program part-time in the Xfinity Series (then known as the Busch Series) during the 2006 season, and began driving part-time in the Cup Series (then known as the Nextel Cup Series) in 2007. He raced full-time in the Cup Series the following year, struggling at first, with eight top-ten finishes over his first three seasons and a top points placing of 28th (in 2009). Hornish returned part-time to the Xfinity Series (then known as the Nationwide Series) in 2011, winning one race. He drove full-time in the series the following year, finishing fourth in points. In 2012 Hornish replaced A. J. Allmendinger (suspended by NASCAR for failing a drug test) in Penske's No. 22 car midway through the season, earning one top-five finish. The following year he returned to the Nationwide Series, winning one race and earning sixteen top-five and 24 top-ten finishes to place second in points (three behind series champion Austin Dillon). Hornish drove part-time for Joe Gibbs Racing in an eight-race 2014 season, with one win and four top-five finishes. He returned to the Cup Series in 2015 with Richard Petty Motorsports, scoring three top-tens and finishing 26th in points. He returned part-time to the Xfinity Series in 2016, winning a race for JGR and finishing sixth or better in all three races he entered for Richard Childress Racing. In 2017, he returned to Penske's Xfinity program for a three-race schedule in the No. 22.

== Early career ==
Hornish began racing go-karts at the age of eleven, winning the World Karting Association U.S. Grand National championship in less than four years. From 1996 to 1998, he made 32 starts in the U.S. F2000 National Championship. In Hornish's final season in the series, he had a career-best, second-place finish at Pikes Peak International Raceway. He finished seventh in points in 1998, and was inducted into the series' Hall of Fame in 2012 as a 1998 graduate. During the 1999 Atlantic Championship season Hornish drove for Michael Shank Racing team owner Mike Shank, winning at Chicago Motor Speedway and finishing seventh in the championship standings with 67 points.

== Sports car racing ==
During the 1999 United States Road Racing Championship season, Hornish drove for Intersport Racing in the United States Road Racing Championship at the season-opening Rolex 24 at Daytona with Jon Field, Ryan Jones and Mike Shank in the Can-Am class. Their car, starting in eighth place, finished 42nd (14th in its class) after retiring on lap 400 with a gearbox failure.

In 2007, Hornish returned to compete in the season-opening Rolex 24 at Daytona for Michael Shank Racing with Mark Patterson, Oswaldo Negri Jr., and Hélio Castroneves in the Daytona Prototype class. Their car started 22nd, in its class and overall. It finished ninth in its class and overall, completing 628 laps.

== IndyCar Series ==
=== 2000: PDM Racing ===
Hornish began driving in the IndyCar Series in 2000 for PDM Racing in the No. 18 G-Force GF05-Oldsmobile Aurora L47 V8. He debuted at the season-opening race at Walt Disney World Speedway, starting in nineteenth place and finishing in twentieth (28 laps behind). In the season's third race, the Vegas Indy 300 at Las Vegas Motor Speedway, Hornish started eighteenth and had his first career podium finish (third place, one lap behind). He qualified for his first Indianapolis 500 in fourteenth place, after his team replaced the G-Force with a Dallara IR00. In mid-race, Hornish was involved in an accident which relegated him to 24th place. Starting twentieth at Kentucky Speedway, he led for a series career-high 38 laps and finished ninth. Hornish ended his season with a 27th- (and last-) place finish at Texas Motor Speedway, finishing his rookie season with 110 points (21st in the point standings).

=== 2001−2003: Panther Racing ===
Before the 2001 Indy Racing League season, Hornish moved to Panther Racing to drive the No. 4 Dallara IR01-Oldsmobile Aurora L47 V8. He began the season with consecutive victories at Phoenix and Homestead-Miami in his first two races with the team. At the Indianapolis 500, Hornish qualified in thirteenth place. He finished fourteenth, four laps behind after an early spin. He continued to drive well, clinching the championship before the final race of the season (a second-place finish at Chicagoland Speedway). Since the winner of each race received fifty points, Hornish's 66-point advantage clinched the championship with one race remaining. At the season-ending race at Texas he started in the pole position, leading for 115 laps in his third win of the season. Hornish won the championship with 503 points, 105 points ahead of second-place Buddy Lazier. At age 22, he was the youngest champion in series history.

In 2002, Hornish returned to Panther Racing, with the team changing manufactures and running a Chevrolet V8. At the season-opening Grand Prix of Miami at Homestead-Miami, he qualified in the pole position and led for 166 of 200 laps to win his fourth career race in the series. Hornish then won the Yamaha Indy 400 at California Speedway, defeating Jaques Lazier by 0.028 second. At the Indianapolis 500, he qualified in seventh place. In the race Hornish brushed the wall on lap 78, damaging his suspension. He returned to the race and finished 25th place, ten laps behind. Hornish won the SunTrust Indy Challenge at Richmond International Raceway three races later. At the Delphi Indy 300 at Chicagoland he defeated Al Unser Jr. by 0.0024 second, the closest finish in series history. In the final race of the season at Texas, Hornish started in third place and led for 79 laps to win by 0.0096 second. He won his second consecutive championship, amassing five wins and eleven top-five finishes over the season.

The beginning of the 2003 season saw Hornish struggle in comparison with his previous two years at Panther. At the Indianapolis 500, he qualified in eighteenth place; in the race, he retired with a blown engine after completing 195 of the 200 laps. Hornish finished the race in fifteenth place, dropping to a tie with Buddy Rice for twelfth place in points. At the following race at Pikes Peak, he started in fourteenth place and finished fifth (his first lead-lap finish of the season). Around this time, Panther Racing and several other teams using the Chevrolet engine built by General Motors (the parent company of Chevrolet) switched to a new engine by Cosworth which was badged as a Chevrolet engine. After the change Hornish's results began improving; he started fourth and finished second, after leading for 126 of 200 laps, at Michigan International Speedway. Two races later, at Kentucky Speedway, he qualified for the pole position and led for 181 of 200 laps to win. Hornish then won two more consecutive races, at Chicagoland and at California Speedway. He won the former race by 0.01 second over Scott Dixon and Bryan Herta, the closest top-three finish in series history. Going into the season-ending Chevy 500 at Texas Motor Speedway, Hornish was mathematically eligible win the championship; however, his car had a spray problem after 176 of 195 laps. He finished seventeenth, and was fifth in the final point standings with 461 points.

=== 2004−2007: Team Penske ===
Hornish began driving for Marlboro Team Penske during the 2004 IndyCar Series season in its No. 6 Dallara IR03-Toyota Indy V8, winning the season opener at Homestead-Miami in his first race with the team, passing teammate Hélio Castroneves on the final lap. After qualifying in eleventh place at the Indianapolis 500, he battled for the lead with Buddy Rice and Dan Wheldon and led for nine laps (the first laps Hornish led in his Indianapolis 500 career). On lap 105, entering the main straightaway out of the fourth turn, Hornish tried to pass Darren Manning and Greg Ray's lapped car. They collided, crashing into the pit lane; Hornish finished 26th, dropping to ninth place in the point standings. The rest of his season was sub-par, with two podium finishes. Hornish was seventh in the championship standings with 387 points, his worst finish since he placed 21st in 2000.

Hornish returned to Team Penske for the 2005 season. At Phoenix in the season's second race, Hornish started in second place and won after leading for 25 laps. During practice for the Indianapolis 500, he drove over a piece of debris after Paul Dana's second-turn crash and flipped over. Two days later Hornish qualified in second place, crashing out after leading for a race-high 77 laps and finishing 23rd. At the Milwaukee Mile he qualified for the pole position and led for 123 of 225 laps, passing Dario Franchitti with nine laps left for his second win of the season. Hornish finished third in the championship standings, with 512 points.

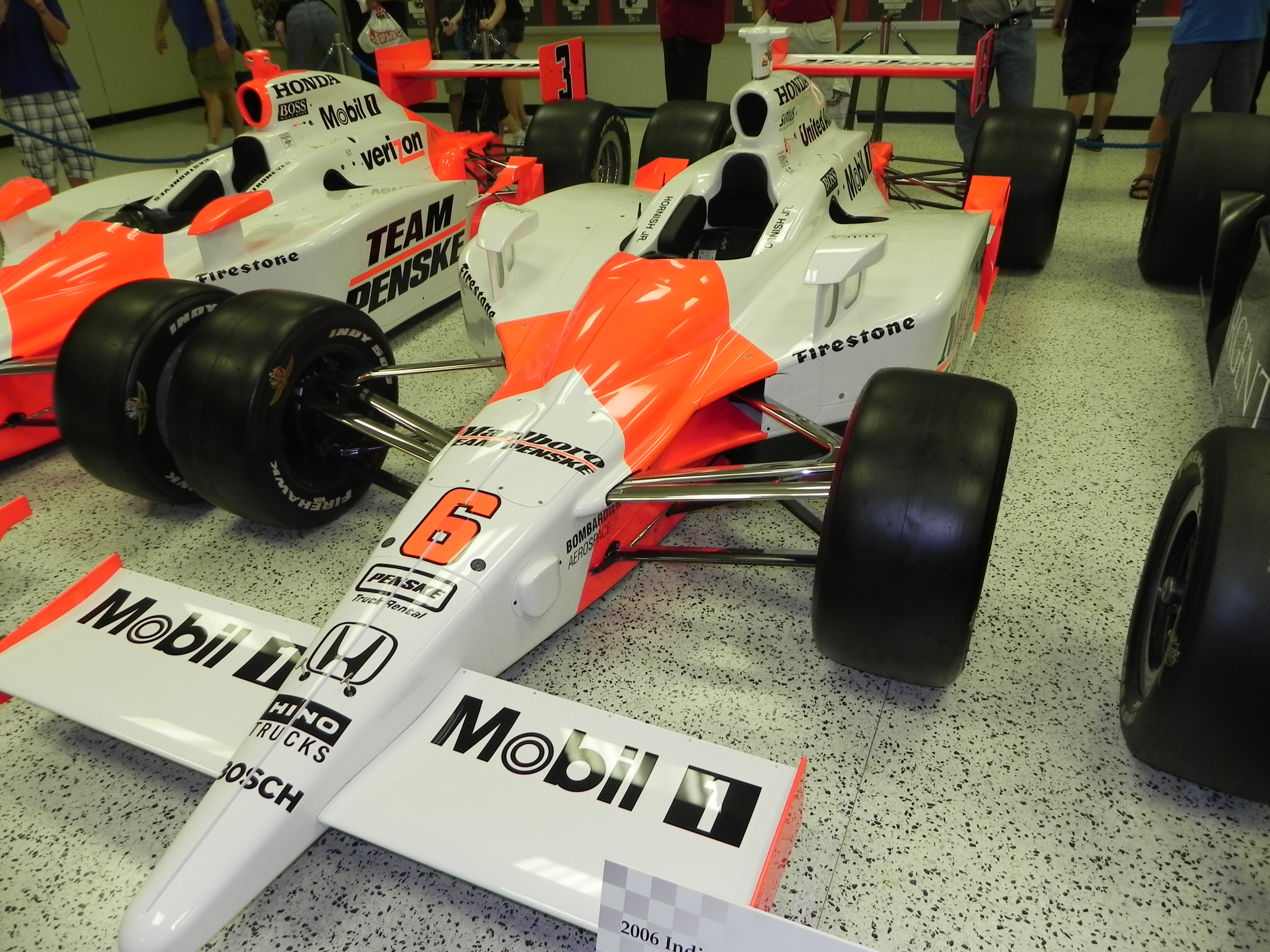
Hornish's 2006 Indianapolis 500 winning car at the Indianapolis Motor Speedway Hall of Fame Museum

Hornish again returned to Penske in 2006. The team changed manufacturers, joining Honda when Toyota and Chevrolet left the series after the 2005 season. His season highlight was the Indianapolis 500, when he passed Marco Andretti for the lead on the final lap to win in the second-closest margin of victory in the race's history. Hornish later said about the pass, "I figured I came all this way, I ought to give myself one more shot at it. I kind of looked at it as, I was going to drive over him if I had to. For Marco to come as a rookie and drive like that he should be proud no matter what." His second win of the season was at Richmond (after leading for all but 38 laps), and he took the points lead after winning the next race at Kansas. His fourth and final win of the season was at Kentucky, when he started second and led for 57 laps. In the season-ending race at Chicagoland Hornish qualified for the pole position and finished third, clinching his third series championship and Penske's first. Although he and Dan Wheldon finished the year with the same number of points, the tie was broken by wins; Hornish had four, and Wheldon two.

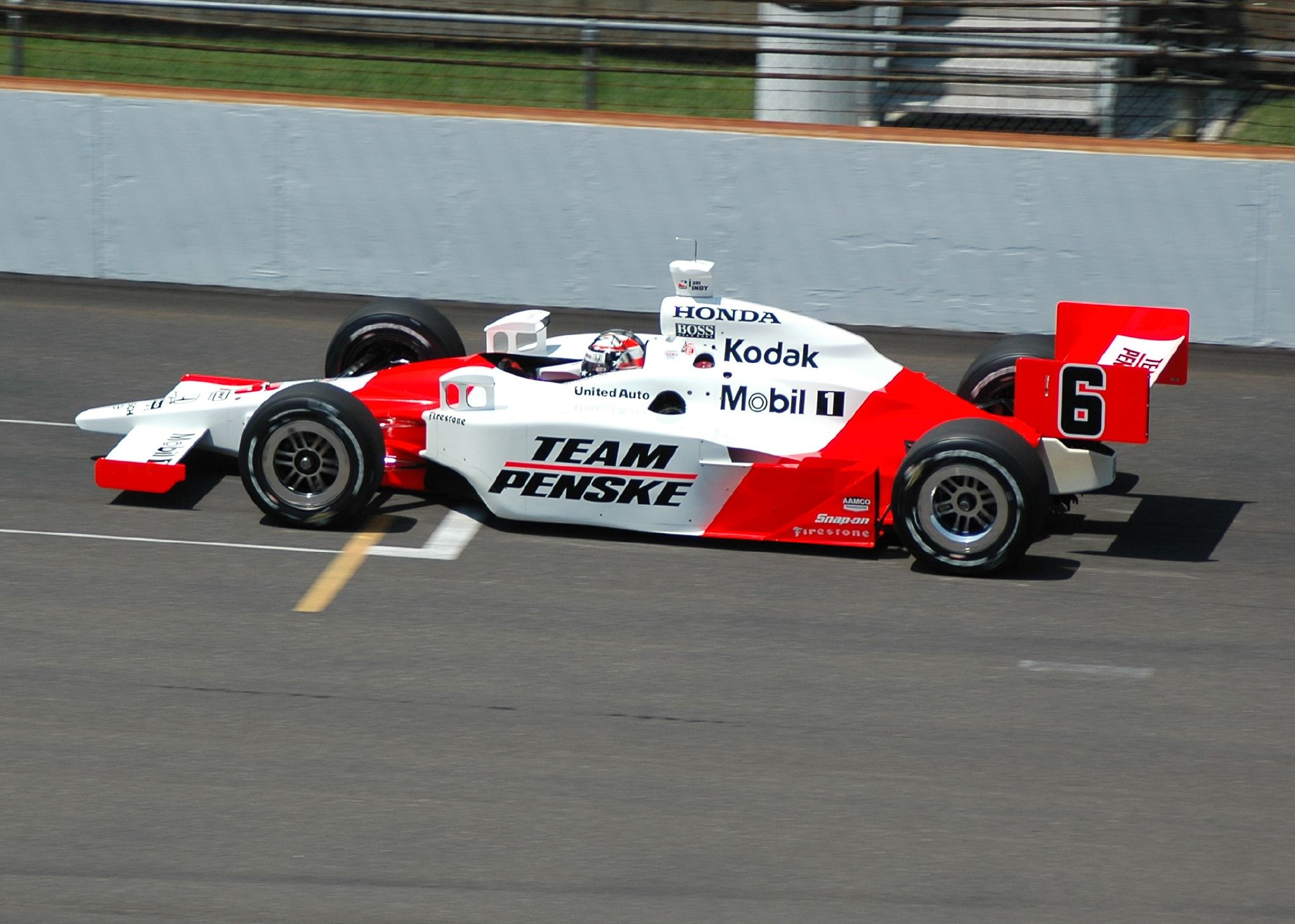
Hornish practicing for the 2007 Indianapolis 500

For the 2007 season, Hornish again returned to Penske, starting the Indianapolis 500 in fifth place. Running consistently in the top ten, he finished fourth when the race was halted by rain after 166 laps. Hornish's only win of the season was the Bombardier Learjet 550 at Texas Motor Speedway, when he started in second place and led for 159 of its 228 laps. His series-best finish on a road course or street circuit, second place at the Camping World Watkins Glen Grand Prix, was overshadowed by an altercation with Tony Kanaan. With the season-ending race at Chicagoland, Hornish ended his IndyCar career with a third-place finish (after starting second and leading for a race-high 90 laps) and finished fifth in the points standings.

After the season, Hornish remained optimistic about an eventual IndyCar return: "I hope they move the schedule so that somebody could do it. That's my goal. If I never ran in the Indy 500 again or an IndyCar Series race I would probably say I would be disappointed about that." He received offers to return after his departure, and in late 2008 was rumored to be returning to replace Hélio Castroneves the next season due to Castroneves' IRS problems. Castroneves was eventually cleared, missing only the season opener with Will Power driving for Penske during his absence. In November 2013, Hornish declined an offer to drive for Chip Ganassi Racing in the upcoming season after Dario Franchitti's career-ending injuries at the 2013 Shell-Pennzoil Grand Prix of Houston.

== International Race of Champions ==
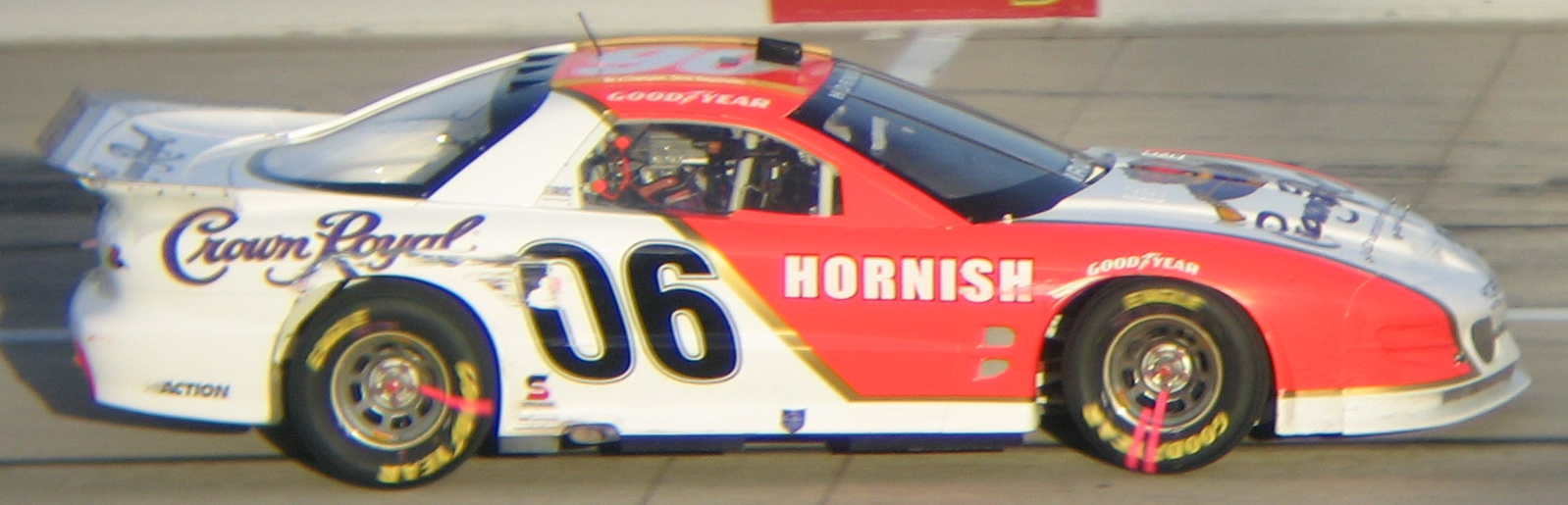
Hornish in the 2006 International Race of Champions at Texas Motor Speedway

Hornish was invited to compete in the 2002, 2003 and 2006 International Race of Champions (IROC). His best points finish in the series was eighth, in 2003 and 2006.

== NASCAR ==
=== 2006−2007: Busch Series ===
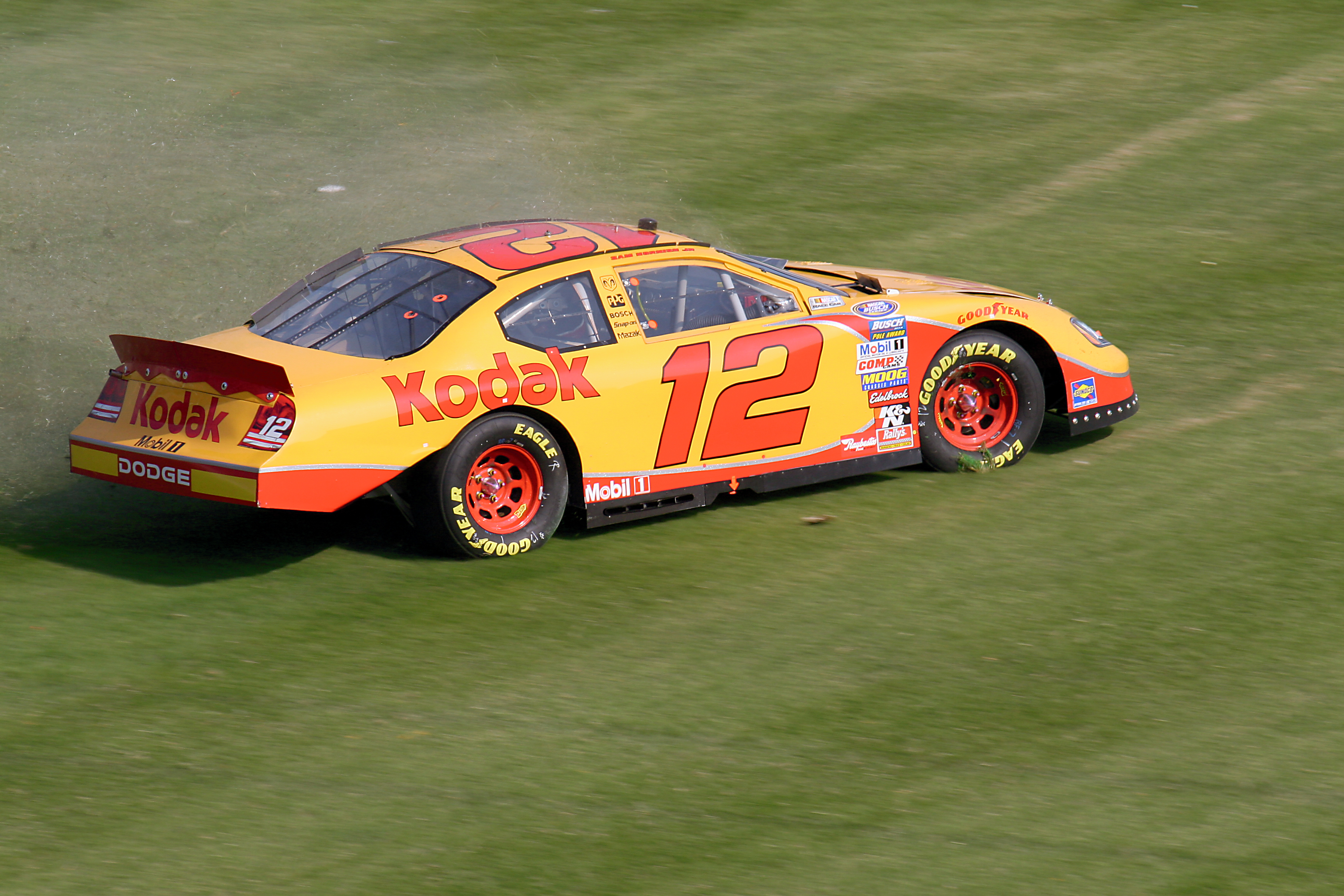
Hornish spinning out at the 2007 O'Reilly Challenge at Texas Motor Speedway

Hornish began competing in the NASCAR Busch Series in the No. 39 Dodge Charger late in the 2006 season for Penske Racing. He drove the last two events of the season, struggling in both races. At Phoenix, Hornish started 27th and finished 36th after a crash on lap 187. In the season-ending race at Homestead-Miami, he was involved a crash after five laps and finished last.

Hornish returned to the series in 2007, driving nine races for Penske in the No. 12. He had his best start and finish of the season in the Nicorette 300 at Atlanta Motor Speedway, starting fifth and finishing fifteenth. Hornish earned another top-ten start (sixth place) at the season-ending race at Homestead-Miami. Despite a good qualifying run, he finished 38th after a crash with Todd Bodine on lap 114.

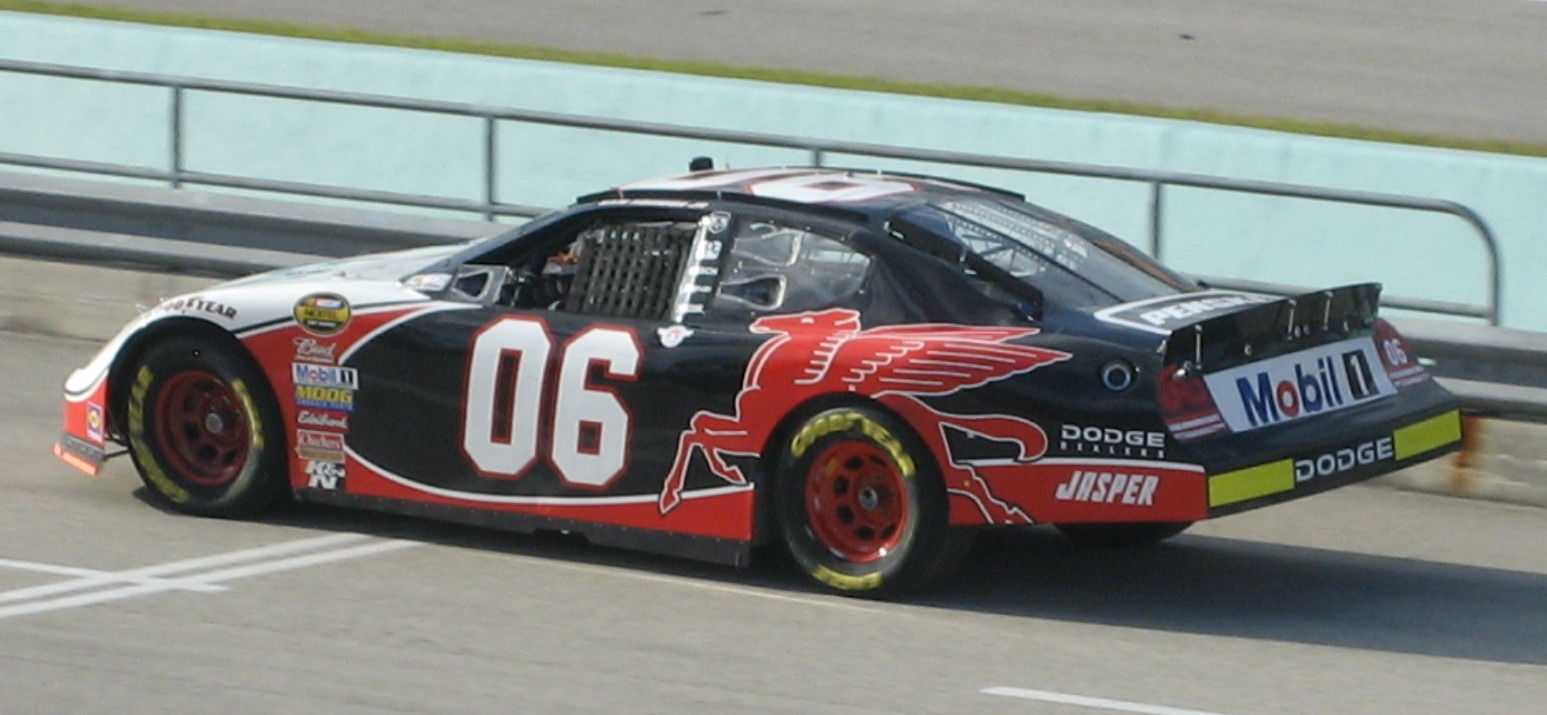
In the pit lane during practice for the 2007 Ford 400 at Homestead-Miami Speedway

In mid-2007, Hornish drove Penske's No. 27 Dodge Charger in an ARCA Re/Max Series race at Michigan International Speedway. Starting in the pole position, he led the first 29 laps of the race before being passed by eventual winner Erik Darnell and finishing second. After the race, he called the transition to stock cars a "challenge": "I'm a student at this, still trying to learn as much as I can. A lot of people have asked me what the toughest transition is, coming over here from the IndyCars and doing these stock car races, and really it's the fact I don't get much practice time."

At the end of the season, Hornish drove in the Nextel Cup Series for Penske Racing South in its No. 06 Dodge Charger, failing to qualify for his first six races. He qualified for the Checker Auto Parts 500 at Phoenix, starting in 26th place and finishing thirtieth (two laps behind). Hornish also qualified for the following race at Homestead-Miami, starting in 29th place. After crashing in turn three of lap 194 he finished 37th, thirteen laps behind.

=== 2008−2010: Penske Racing ===
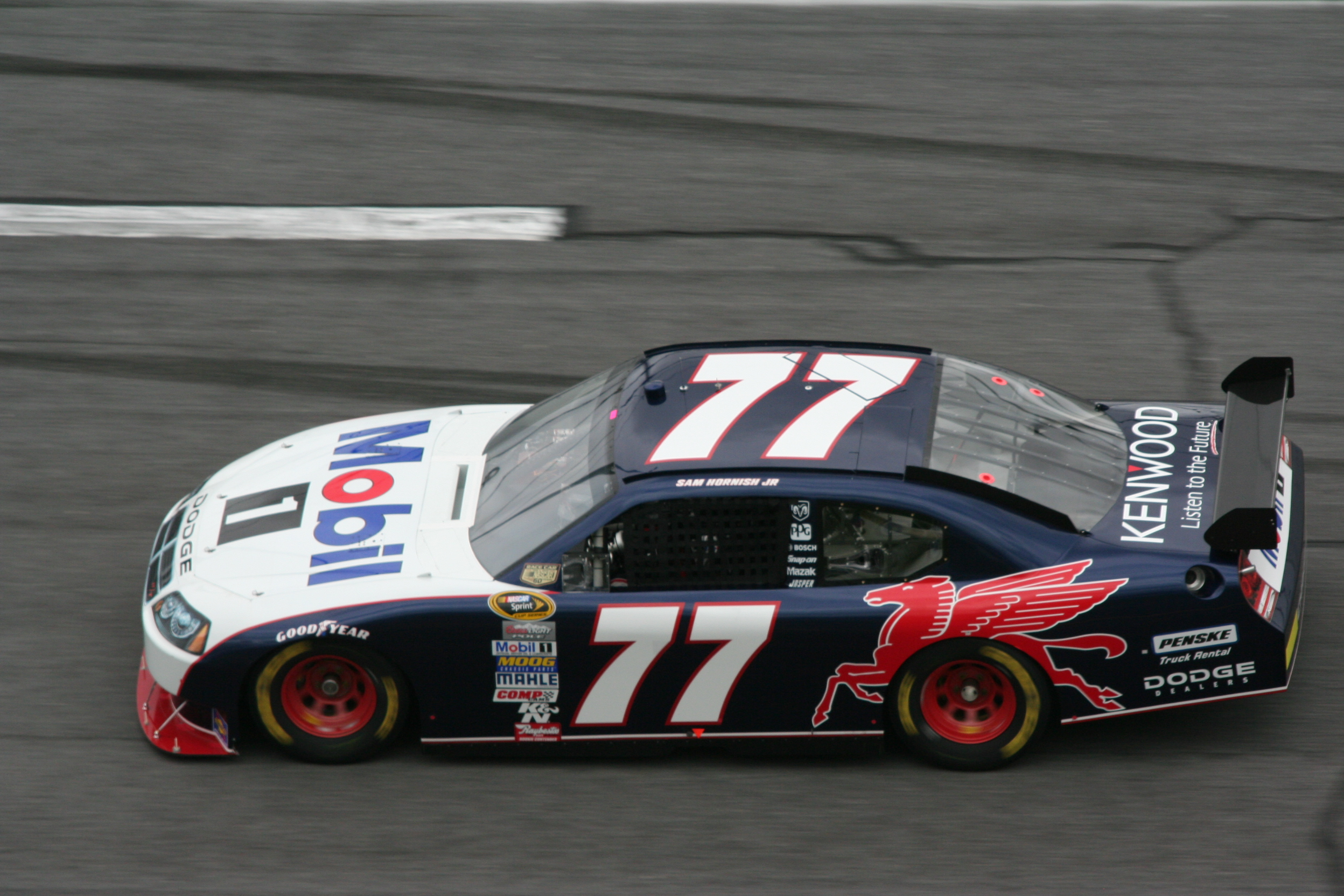
Practicing for the 2008 Daytona 500

In 2008, Hornish drove full-time for Penske in its renumbered No. 77 car. Before the season, Penske swapped cars and owners' points with Kurt Busch; Hornish was guaranteed a starting position in the first five races and Busch, who won the series championship in 2004, would also be guaranteed a starting position as the most recent series champion driving a car outside the top-35 in owners' points. At the season-opening Daytona 500, Hornish qualified in 19th place; he finished 15th as teammates Ryan Newman and Busch were first and second, respectively. In the season's second race, the Auto Club 500 at Auto Club Speedway, Hornish sustained collateral damage when Casey Mears crashed into Dale Earnhardt Jr. on lap 22. Mears' car flipped 270 degrees, and Hornish's car caught fire. Hornish finished in 43rd place. Although he struggled during his rookie season, he drove well in May at Lowe's Motor Speedway. In the exhibition Sprint Showdown at Lowe's, Hornish drove a car that was set up with an angled rear-end housing that was designed to cause air to hit the right side of the car, generate side force, improve grip in the turns, and allow a looser setup. This setup made the car look like it was drifting or crabwalking on straightaways and was banned following the all-star race. Hornish started eighth and finished second. By finishing in the top-two, he qualified for the exhibition 2008 NASCAR Sprint All-Star Race and still used the car with the angled rear-end housing, starting 23rd out of 24 cars and finishing seventh. Hornish had his best finish (13th place) of the season at the Coca-Cola 600, also at Lowe's. Late in the season his Penske team dropped out of the top-35 in owners' points, and Hornish failed to qualify for the AMP Energy 500 at Talladega Superspeedway and the season-ending Ford 400 at Homestead-Miami Speedway. He finished 35th in the drivers' standings, with 2,523 points. Hornish was second in the rookie of the year standings, after a season-long battle with Regan Smith.

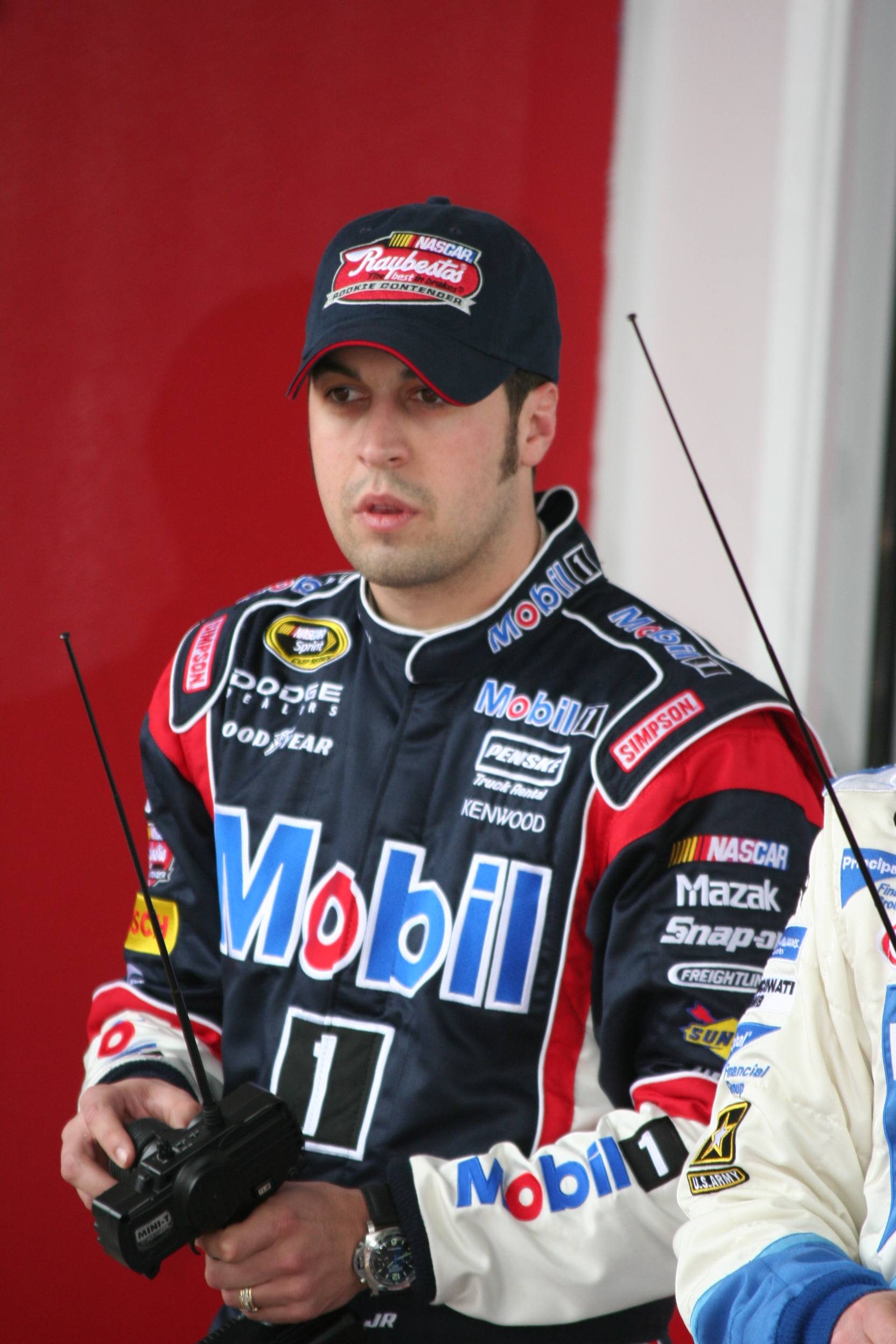
Racing a remote-controlled car before the 2008 season

Hornish drove for Penske in the renamed Nationwide Series, failing to qualify for his first two races of the season. Hornish's best finish of the season was eleventh place in the Diamond Hill Plywood 200 at Darlington Raceway, where he started twelfth. In the Carquest Auto Parts 300 at Lowe's Motor Speedway he led his first laps of the series (eight), but a mid-race accident relegated him to 39th place. Late in the season, Hornish drove one race in the Craftsman Truck Series (the Kroger 200 at Martinsville Speedway) for Bobby Hamilton Racing in its No. 4 Dodge Ram, starting sixteenth and finishing ninth.

In the 2009 Sprint Cup season Hornish returned to Penske, now known as Penske Championship Racing. For the second straight year, his team changed owners' points (purchasing them from Dave Blaney and Bill Davis Racing this time) to guarantee him a starting spot in the first five races. At the season-opening Daytona 500, Hornish started 29th and finished 32nd (one lap behind). He had his first top-ten finish of the season (ninth place) at Phoenix, followed by six more throughout the year. Hornish's victory in the Sprint Showdown at Lowe's Motor Speedway qualified him for the 2009 NASCAR Sprint All-Star Race, where he started nineteenth and finished sixteenth. Later that season, he had two top-five finishes: a career-best fourth at Pocono and a fifth at Michigan. At Watkins Glen, Hornish was involved in a very violent crash. Coming off of turn 9, Hornish was racing with Kasey Kahne where Kasey got loose and got into Hornish causing Hornish to spin. He hit a tire barrier on the left rear of the car and shot him back across the race track spinning like a top where he was then nearly t-boned by Jeff Gordon which spun Hornish's car even faster and then was hit again in the left front by Jeff Burton where it nearly sent Hornish on his side. Gordon's impact into Hornish was so vicious, it ripped the whole rear including the fuel cell out of Hornish's car. Fortunately, Hornish, Gordon, and Burton walked out under their own power uninjured. Hornish finished 28th in the final standings, with 3,203 points.

Hornish joined Penske again in 2010. At the season-opening Daytona 500, Hornish started 26th and was involved in an early accident on the race's ninth lap; he finished 37th, completing 160 of its 208 laps. His qualifying results improved slightly during the rest of the season, with three top-fives. Hornish's only top-ten finish of the season was tenth place at the Sylvania 300 at New Hampshire Motor Speedway. He finished 29th in the standings, with 3,214 points. After the season Hornish's longtime sponsor, Mobil 1, left him and Penske for Tony Stewart and Stewart–Haas Racing. In the 2010 Nationwide Series he drove the season-ending race at Homestead-Miami for Brian Keselowski Motorsports (in conjunction with Penske) in its No. 26 Dodge Avenger, starting twelfth and finishing 21st.

=== 2011−2014: Return to Nationwide competition ===
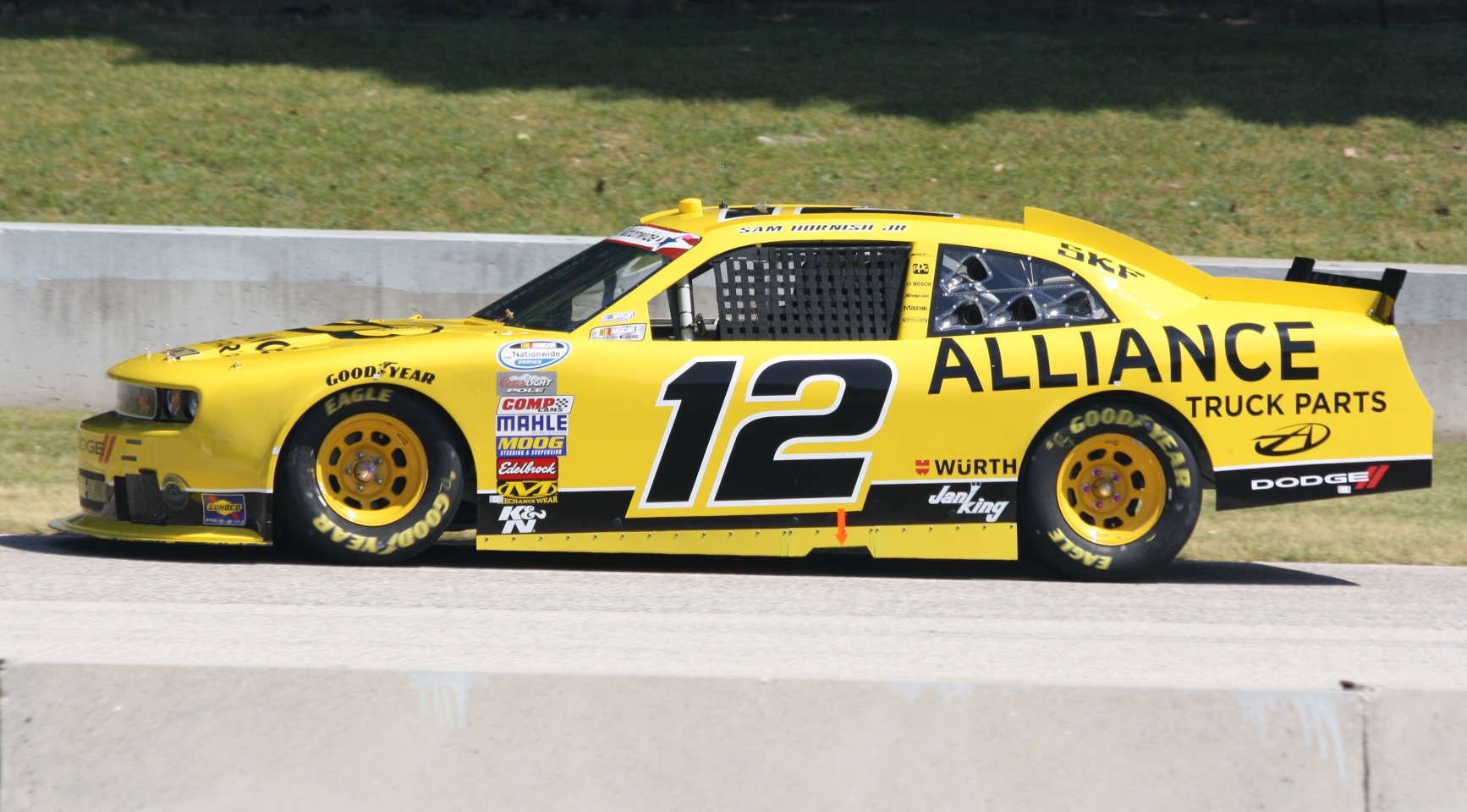
In the 2012 Sargento 200 at Road America

Before the 2011 season, Penske sold the owners' points of its No. 77 car to Rusty Wallace Racing, to be driven by owner Rusty Wallace's son (and team driver) Steve at the season-opening Daytona 500, for financial reasons. As a result, Penske moved Hornish to the Nationwide Series to drive the team's No. 12 Dodge Charger. He drove the 5-hour Energy 500 at Pocono Raceway in Front Row Motorsports' No. 38 Ford Fusion, filling in for Travis Kvapil (who was driving in a Truck Series event at Texas). Hornish started in 26th place and finished 35th, 60 laps behind. He drove twelve races with the No. 12 team, moving to Penske's No. 22 for a thirteenth race at Iowa Speedway. At Iowa Hornish started in third place and led from laps thirteen through 51, later dropping five laps behind to finish 24th. In the WYPALL* 200 Powered by Kimberly-Clark Professional at Phoenix International Raceway, he started in fifth place and led for the race's final 61 laps after passing Ricky Stenhouse Jr. (who led for a race-high 73 laps) for his first career victory in the series.

Hornish returned to the series with Penske for a full-time season in 2012. Winless, he had second-place finishes at Indianapolis, Montréal and Kentucky. After a race at Talladega Superspeedway, Danica Patrick intentionally spun Hornish's car into the main straightaway wall after he made contact with her during the race. He finished fourth at the season-ending Ford EcoBoost 300 at Homestead-Miami Speedway, and was fourth in points with 1,146.

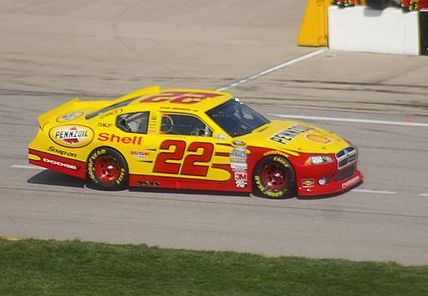
In the pit lane at the 2012 GEICO 400 at Chicagoland Speedway

Hornish returned to the Sprint Cup Series for one race in Penske's No. 12: the STP 400 at Kansas Speedway. Starting in tenth place, he led for seven laps and finished nineteenth (one lap behind). Midway through the season, Hornish replaced A. J. Allmendinger in Penske's No. 22 car after Allmendinger was suspended by NASCAR for failing a drug test. Allmendinger qualified in eighth place, but due to the driver change Hornish had to move to the rear of the field. He finished 33rd, after a mid-race crash required ten laps of repair time. Hornish drove the car in the remaining races, with a season-best fifth place at Watkins Glen. Aside from that race, his best finishes were a trio of eleventh places at Atlanta, Richmond and Chicagoland. Hornish's best start of the season was fourth at Dover, where he finished 25th (seven laps behind).

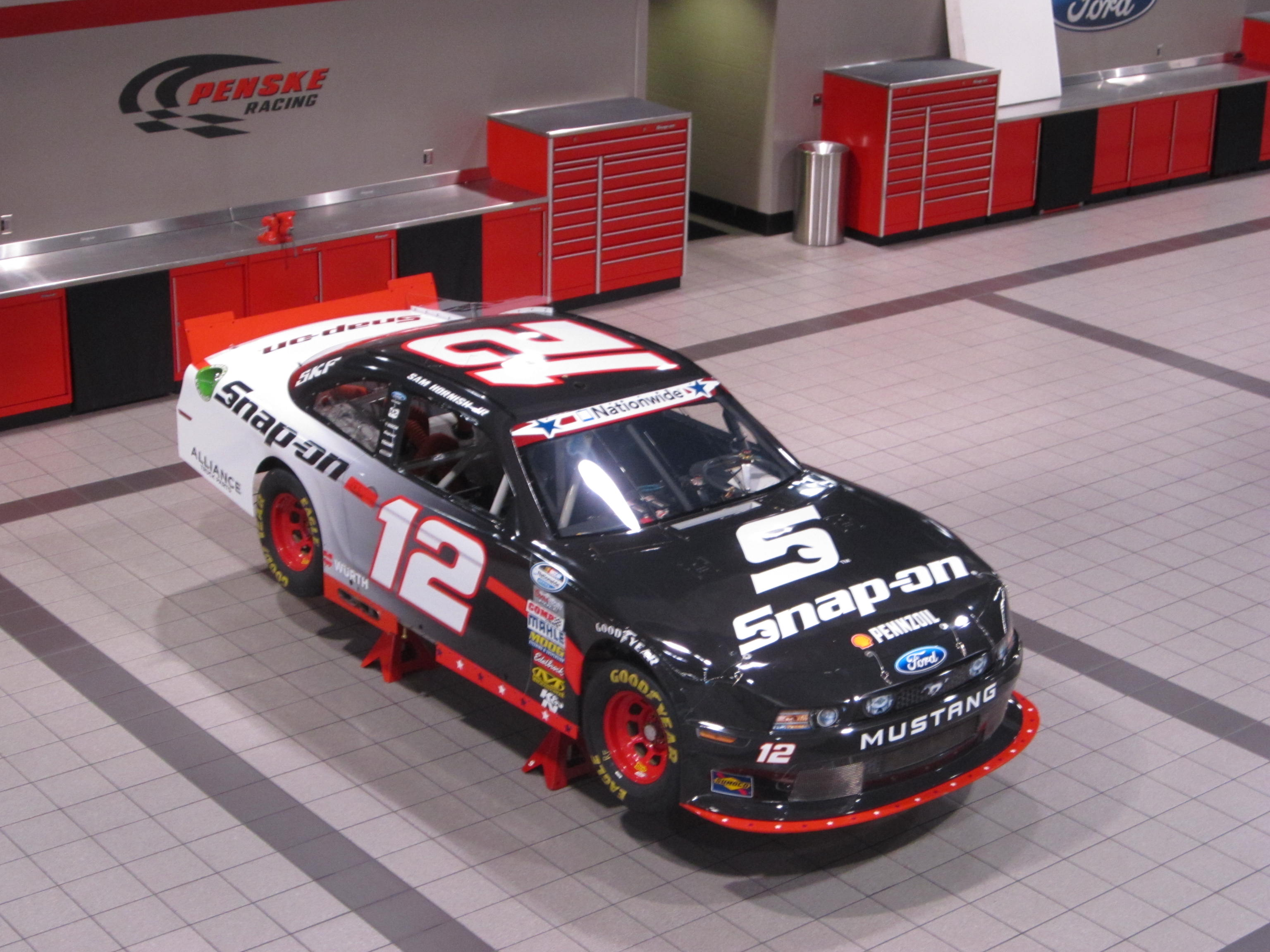
One of Hornish's 2013 cars at the Team Penske facilities

Hornish returned to the Nationwide Series full-time for Penske in 2013 to drive the No. 12, now a Ford Mustang after Penske changed manufacturers. Hornish's 2013 season was his best to date, with sixteen top-five and 25 top-ten finishes. At the season-opening DRIVE4COPD 300 at Daytona International Speedway, Hornish started and finished second despite his involvement in a serious crash on the final lap. Since race winner Tony Stewart was only eligible to score points for the Sprint Cup Series, Hornish was the series points leader after the Daytona race. At the Sam's Town 300 at Las Vegas Motor Speedway, he led for 114 laps in his second Nationwide victory. Before the season-ending Ford EcoBoost 300 at Homestead-Miami Speedway Hornish was second in points, eight behind Austin Dillon. Hornish qualified in the pole position and led for 37 laps, finishing eighth; Dillon, who finished twelfth, won the series championship. Hornish was second in the final point standings, with 1,177. During the season, car owner Roger Penske said that Hornish (who had driven for the team since 2004) would be released due to a lack of sponsorship. Hornish planned to drive Penske's No. 12 in the Sprint Cup Series at Kansas and Talladega. At Kansas he started in fourth place, running as high as third before crashing on lap 183 due to winds. The qualifier was rained out at Talladega, and Hornish failed to qualify because he had only one other Cup start that season.

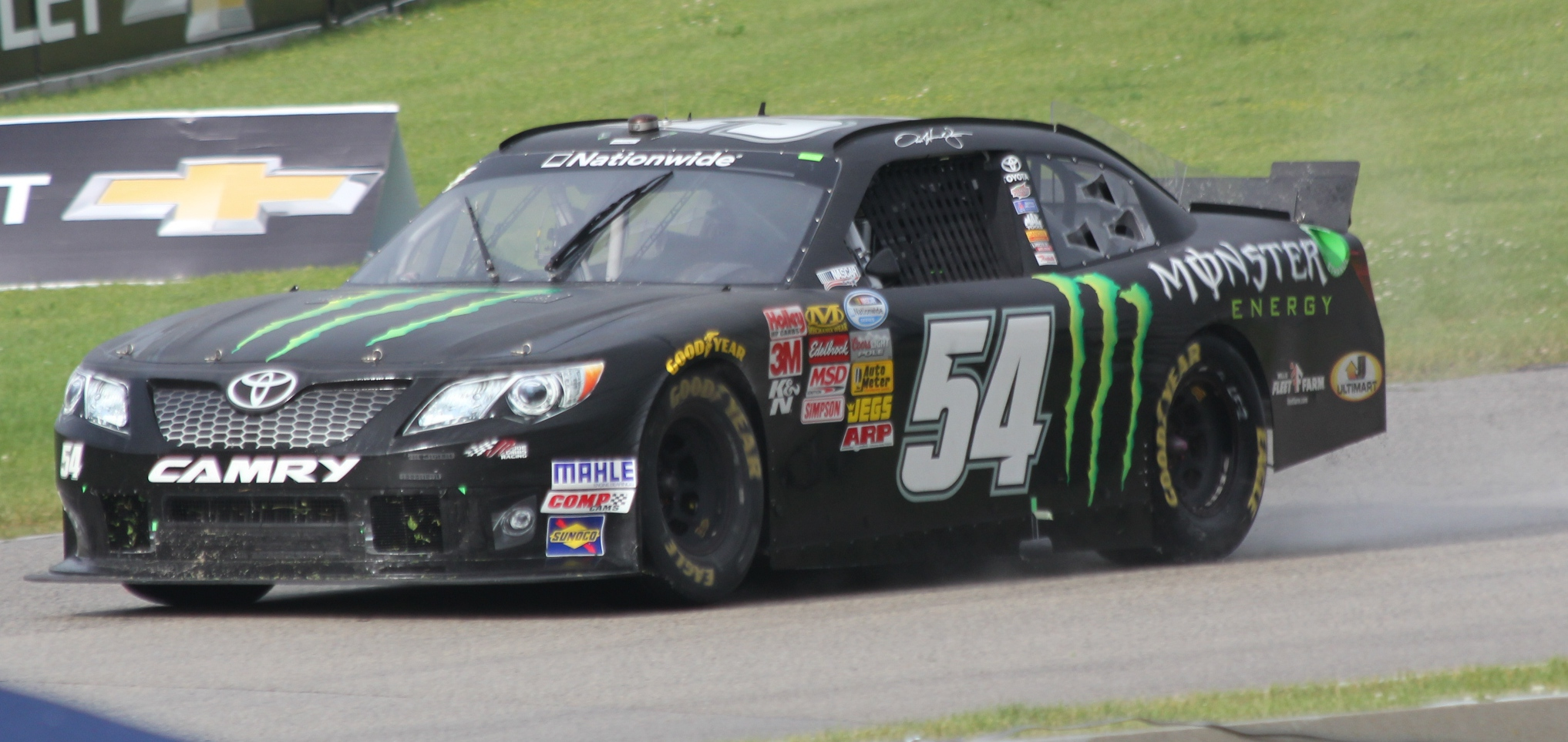
In the 2014 Gardner Denver 200 Fired Up by Johnsonville at Road America

In 2014, Hornish drove for Joe Gibbs Racing in its No. 54 Toyota Camry for a part-time season. Hornish drove seven races in the No. 54, also driving the No. 20 Camry at Michigan (where he finished second). In the No. 54, he started on the pole at Talladega and Mid-Ohio. The highlight of Hornish's season was his victory in the Get To Know Newton 250 at Iowa Speedway, where he started in second place and led for 167 laps. Despite his limited schedule he finished 27th with 242 points, the highest-ranked driver with less than ten starts. Gibbs tapped Hornish to drive the Auto Club 400 at Auto Club Speedway in the No. 11 Camry when regular driver Denny Hamlin was sidelined by a severe sinus infection, and he finished 17th.

=== 2015: Richard Petty Motorsports ===
"He's a family man who fits well with our core values and he will be a great ambassador for our partners. Sam's also proven that he can win races and compete for a championship. He came into the NASCAR Sprint Cup Series with a steep learning curve from open-wheel racing, but has shown in the Nationwide Series that he is a winner. We feel that he can get the No. 9 team to Victory Lane and compete in the Chase for us."

— Richard Petty, announcing his team's signing of Hornish

In 2015, Hornish returned full-time to the Sprint Cup Series, driving the No. 9 Ford Fusion for Richard Petty Motorsports (RPM). He replaced Marcos Ambrose, who returned to racing V8 Supercars for DJR Team Penske. Hornish began the season with a twelfth-place finish at the Daytona 500, after starting 38th. He struggled after the season opener, finishing thirtieth or worse in four of the next eight races. In the GEICO 500 at Talladega Superspeedway, Hornish had a season-best sixth-place finish; after the race, Kevin Manion replaced Drew Blickensderfer as his crew chief. He later finished in the top ten at both road-course races (tenth and ninth at Sonoma Raceway and Watkins Glen International, respectively). In the Coke Zero 400 at Daytona he was involved in a single-car accident on lap 155, driving into the infield at nearly full speed. Hornish's splitter was pushed under the front of the car; he nearly flipped when the front of the car dug into the grass, and nearly flipped again when he crossed a track access road. He retired from the race, finishing thirtieth. On November 14, 2015, RPM announced that they did not expect Hornish to return to the team for the 2016 season.

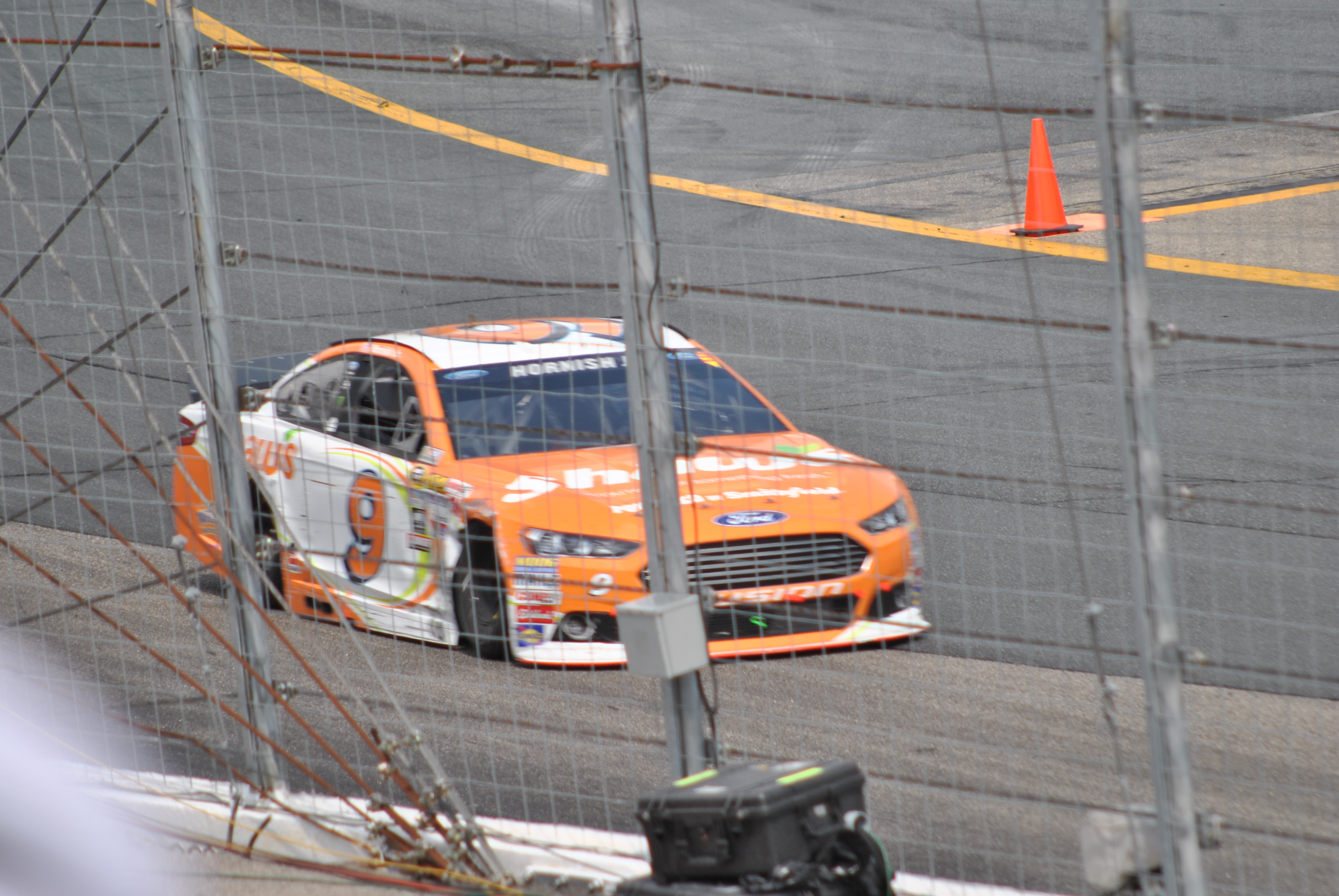
Racing at New Hampshire Motor Speedway in 2015

Hornish also drove Biagi-DenBeste Racing's No. 98 Ford Mustang part-time in the former Nationwide Series, renamed the Xfinity Series. In three races with the team he had one lead-lap finish, a fourteenth place at Texas.

=== 2016–2017: Part-time Xfinity Series schedule ===
On May 11, 2016, an article posted online by Sports Illustrated appeared to acknowledge that Hornish had retired from racing after being released by Richard Petty Motorsports, saying he "unharnessed himself one last time" and "hung up his helmet at the end of last season." Five days later, however, an article from The Crescent-News (based in Hornish's birthplace of Defiance, Ohio) quoted Hornish as saying, "I'm still working on something to race in good equipment. Possibilities still exist for this year, but there were a couple of different opportunities that didn't pan out because somebody else brought money to the table."

On June 8, 2016, Richard Childress Racing announced plans to add Hornish to their Xfinity Series driver lineup, hiring him to drive the No. 2 Chevrolet Camaro at the July Iowa race and Kentucky. He also ran the No. 2 at Mid-Ohio. Additionally, Hornish returned to Joe Gibbs Racing to drive the No. 18 Toyota Camry in place of an injured Matt Tifft for the June Iowa race, a race he went on to win.

In June 2017, Hornish returned to the Xfinity Series with Penske, driving the No. 22 Mustang at both Iowa races and the Mid-Ohio event. At Mid-Ohio, Hornish won the pole, and proceeded to lead 61 of the 75 laps en route to victory in his home state. Hornish returned to Penske for the fall race at Kentucky, as well as the Charlotte and Homestead playoff races, finishing second in both.

== Personal life ==
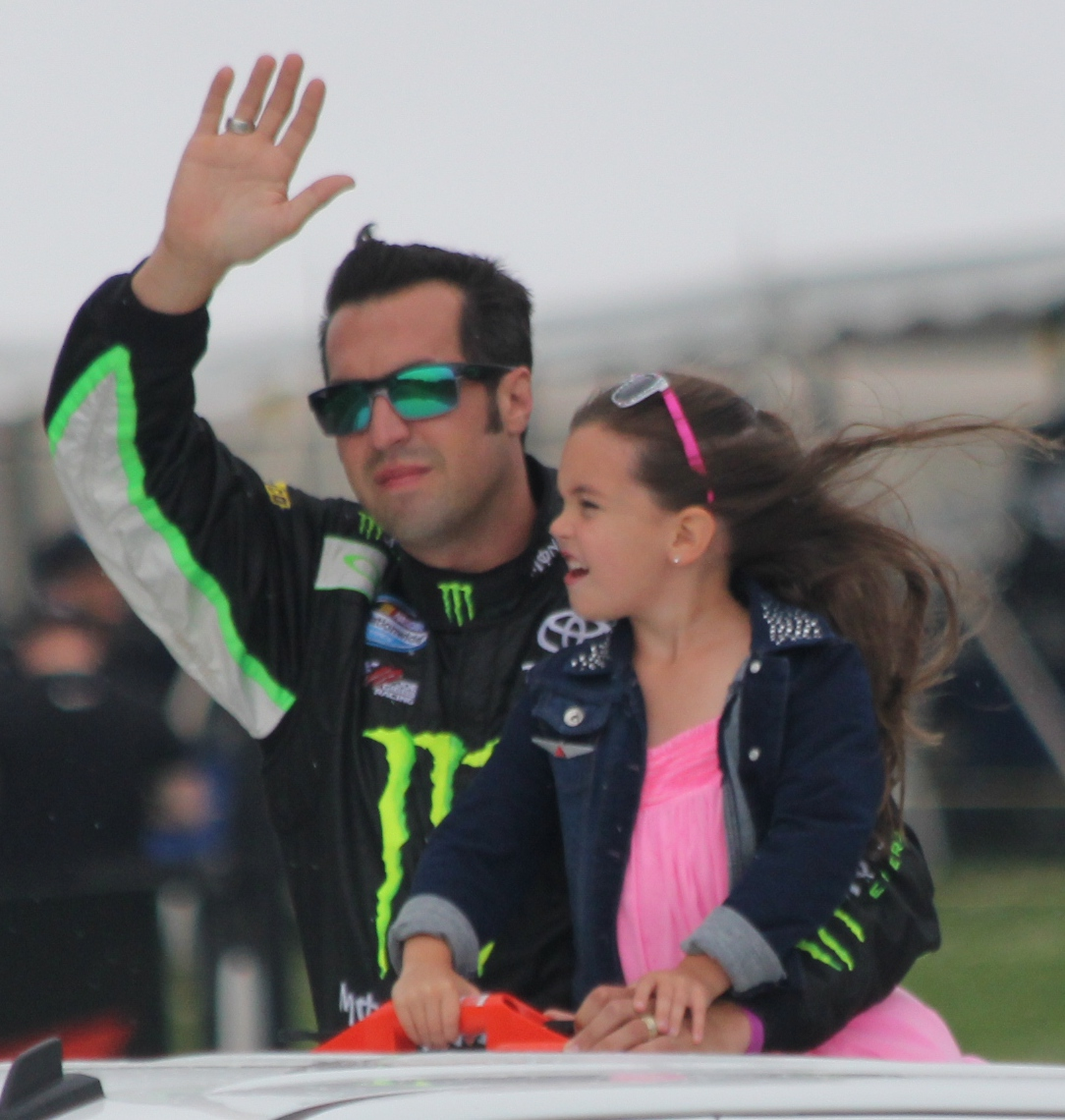
With daughter Addison during driver introductions at the 2014 Gardner Denver 200 at Road America

Hornish, a 1998 graduate of Archbold High School in Archbold, Ohio, lives in Napoleon, Ohio. He and his wife, Crystal, have three children: two daughters (Addison and Eliza) and a son, Sam III. His niece, Hope, was a NASCAR Drive for Diversity member in 2016.

Hornish has helped create a senior center in Defiance, and helped add a heart center at Defiance Medical Center. During a race weekend at Texas Motor Speedway, Hornish (an avid bowler) promoted a charity bowling event. His work with Speedway Children's Charities has raised over $500,000 to benefit North Texas children. Hornish collects and customizes classic automobiles; he owns a 1930 Model A Ford, a 1951 Mercury, a 1955 Chevrolet Del Ray, a 1965 Cadillac Coupe de Ville, a 1967 Chevrolet pickup truck and a Corvette ZO6 Indianapolis 500 pace car. Hornish has also worked as a substitute school teacher while away from the track, and has also taught Vacation Bible School.

== Media appearances ==
Hornish's Panther Racing car is on the cover of the 2003 IndyCar Series video game. As early as 2004, he made frequent guest appearances on the auto-racing call-in show WindTunnel with Dave Despain. When he won the Indianapolis 500 Hornish appeared on Live! with Regis and Kelly, and he was a guest on the September 12, 2006 Late Show with David Letterman after winning the 2006 IndyCar Series championship.

Hornish narrated the American dub of the British children's television series Roary the Racing Car, replacing former British racing driver Stirling Moss. He later called the opportunity his "one chance to do something Stirling Moss did."

In 2012, Hornish became co-host of the auto racing news and highlight show, SPEED Center. Two years later, he was a color commentator for the NBCSN broadcast of the IndyCar GoPro Grand Prix of Sonoma, and was a NASCAR analyst for Fox Sports 1 throughout the season.

== Motorsports career results ==
=== American open-wheel racing ===
(key) (Races in bold indicate pole position) (Races in italics indicate fastest lap)

==== Atlantic Championship ====
Atlantic Championship results
| Year | Team | 1 | 2 | 3 | 4 | 5 | 6 | 7 | 8 | 9 | 10 | 11 | 12 | Rank | Points | Ref |
|---|---|---|---|---|---|---|---|---|---|---|---|---|---|---|---|---|
| 1999 | Shank Racing | LBH; 8 | NAZ; 18 | GAT; 4 | MIL; 8 | MTL; 12 | ROA; 9 | TRR; 19 | MOH; 7 | CHI; 1 | VAN; 10 | LS; 6 | HOU; 10 | 7th | 67 | |

==== IndyCar Series ====
IndyCar Series results
| Year | Team | No. | Chassis | Engine | 1 | 2 | 3 | 4 | 5 | 6 | 7 | 8 | 9 | 10 | 11 | 12 | 13 | 14 | 15 | 16 | 17 | Rank | Points | Ref |
|---|---|---|---|---|---|---|---|---|---|---|---|---|---|---|---|---|---|---|---|---|---|---|---|---|
| 2000 | PDM Racing | 18 | G-Force | Oldsmobile | WDW; 20 | PHX; 17 | LVS; 3 | | | PPIR; 19 | ATL | KTY; 9 | TXS; 27 | | | | | | | | | 21st | 110 | |
| 2000 | PDM Racing | 18 | Dallara | Oldsmobile | | | | INDY; 24 | TXS; 20 | | | | | | | | | | | | | 21st | 110 | |
| 2001 | Panther Racing | 4 | Dallara | Oldsmobile | PHX; 1 | HMS; 1 | ATL; 4 | INDY; 14 | TXS; 3 | PPIR; 2 | RIR; 2 | KAN; 2 | NSH; 6 | KTY; 3 | **GTW**; 3 | CHI; 2 | **TXS**; 1 | | | | | 1st | 503 | |
| 2002 | Panther Racing | 4 | Dallara | Chevrolet | **HMS**; 1 | PHX; 3 | FON; 1 | NZR; 17 | INDY; 25 | TXS; 18 | PPIR; 3 | RIR; 1 | KAN; 2 | NSH; 3 | MIS; 7 | KTY; 2 | GTW; 5 | **CHI**; 1 | TXS; 1 | | | 1st | 531 | |
| 2003 | Panther Racing | 4 | Dallara | Chevrolet | HMS; 10 | PHX; 21 | MOT; 6 | INDY; 15 | TXS; 10 | PPIR; 5 | RIR; 4 | KAN; 17 | NSH; 11 | MIS; 2 | GTW; 6 | **KTY**; 1 | NZR; 2 | CHI; 1 | FON; 1 | TXS; 17 | | 5th | 461 | |
| 2004 | Team Penske | 6 | Dallara | Toyota | HMS; 1 | PHX; 15 | MOT; 19 | INDY; 26 | TXS; 4 | RIR; 11 | KAN; 8 | NSH; 2 | MIL; 3 | MIS; 4 | KTY; 14 | PPIR; 18 | NZR; 11 | CHI; 6 | FON; 4 | TXS; 17 | | 7th | 387 | |
| 2005 | Team Penske | 6 | Dallara | Toyota | HMS; 2 | PHX; 1 | STP; 15 | **MOT**; 7 | INDY; 23 | TXS; 2 | **RIR**; 18 | KAN; 12 | NSH; 2 | **MIL**; 1 | MIS; 5 | KTY; 7 | PPIR; 2 | SNM; 17 | CHI; 3 | WGL; 7 | FON; 5 | 3rd | 512 | |
| 2006 | Team Penske | 6 | Dallara | Honda | **HMS**; 3 | STP; 8 | MOT; 4 | **INDY**; 1 | WGL; 12 | **TXS**; 4 | RIR; 1 | KAN; 1 | NSH; 14 | MIL; 2 | MIS; 19 | KTY; 1 | SNM; 9 | **CHI**; 3 | | | | 1st | 475 | |
| 2007 | Team Penske | 6 | Dallara | Honda | HMS; 3 | STP; 7 | MOT; 5 | KAN; 6 | INDY; 4 | MIL; 9 | TXS; 1 | IOW; 14 | RIR; 15 | WGL; 2 | NSH; 4 | MOH; 14 | MIS; 9 | KTY; 18 | SNM; 5 | DET; 12 | CHI; 3 | 5th | 465 | |

| Years | Teams | Races | Poles | Wins | Podiums (non-win) | Top 10s (non-podium) | Indianapolis 500 wins | Championships |
|---|---|---|---|---|---|---|---|---|
| 8 | 3 | 116 | 12 | 19 | 28 | 32 | 1 (2006) | 3 (2001, 2002, 2006) |

==== Indianapolis 500 ====
| Year | Chassis | Engine | Start | Finish | Team |
|---|---|---|---|---|---|
| 2000 | Dallara IR00 | Oldsmobile Aurora L47 V8 | 14 | 24 | PDM Racing |
| 2001 | Dallara IR01 | Oldsmobile Aurora L47 V8 | 13 | 14 | Panther Racing |
| 2002 | Dallara IR02 | Chevrolet V8 | 7 | 25 | Panther Racing |
| 2003 | Dallara IR03 | Chevrolet V8 | 18 | 15 | Panther Racing |
| 2004 | Dallara IR03 | Toyota Indy V8 | 11 | 26 | Marlboro Team Penske |
| 2005 | Dallara IR03 | Toyota Indy V8 | 2 | 23 | Marlboro Team Penske |
| 2006 | Dallara IR03 | Ilmor-Honda Indy V8 HI4R | **1** | **1** | Marlboro Team Penske |
| 2007 | Dallara IR05 | Ilmor-Honda Indy V8 HI7R | 5 | 4 | Team Penske |

=== NASCAR ===
(key) (Bold – Pole position awarded by time. Italics – Pole position earned by points standings. * – Most laps led.)

==== Sprint Cup Series ====
NASCAR Sprint Cup Series results
| Year | Team | No. | Make | 1 | 2 | 3 | 4 | 5 | 6 | 7 | 8 | 9 | 10 | 11 | 12 | 13 | 14 | 15 | 16 | 17 | 18 | 19 | 20 | 21 | 22 | 23 | 24 | 25 | 26 | 27 | 28 | 29 | 30 | 31 | 32 | 33 | 34 | 35 | 36 | NSCC | Pts | Ref |
|---|---|---|---|---|---|---|---|---|---|---|---|---|---|---|---|---|---|---|---|---|---|---|---|---|---|---|---|---|---|---|---|---|---|---|---|---|---|---|---|---|---|---|
| 2007 | Penske Racing South | 06 | Dodge | DAY | CAL | LVS | ATL | BRI | MAR | TEX | PHO | TAL | RCH | DAR | CLT | DOV | POC | MCH | SON | NHA | DAY | CHI | IND | POC | GLN | MCH | BRI | CAL | RCH | NHA; DNQ | DOV; DNQ | KAN | TAL; DNQ | CLT; DNQ | MAR; DNQ | ATL; DNQ | TEX | PHO; 30 | HOM; 37 | 62nd | 125 | |
| 2008 | Penske Racing South | 77 | Dodge | DAY; 15 | CAL; 43 | LVS; 41 | ATL; 25 | BRI; 29 | MAR; 28 | TEX; 32 | PHO; 20 | TAL; 35 | RCH; 23 | DAR; 38 | CLT; 13 | DOV; 18 | POC; 42 | MCH; 22 | SON; 31 | NHA; 39 | DAY; 29 | CHI; 37 | IND; 21 | POC; 26 | GLN; 32 | MCH; 22 | BRI; 37 | CAL; 31 | RCH; 38 | NHA; 30 | DOV; 42 | KAN; 33 | TAL; DNQ | CLT; 22 | MAR; 34 | ATL; 24 | TEX; 23 | PHO; 33 | HOM; DNQ | 35th | 2523 | |
| 2009 | Penske Championship Racing | 77 | Dodge | DAY; 32 | CAL; 23 | LVS; 16 | ATL; 37 | BRI; 31 | MAR; 34 | TEX; 17 | PHO; 9 | TAL; 34 | RCH; 6 | DAR; 30 | CLT; 16 | DOV; 13 | POC; 10 | MCH; 29 | SON; 38 | NHA; 8 | DAY; 32 | CHI; 38 | IND; 37 | POC; 4 | GLN; 35 | MCH; 5 | BRI; 35 | ATL; 35 | RCH; 8 | NHA; 37 | DOV; 26 | KAN; 18 | CAL; 12 | CLT; 40 | MAR; 36 | TAL; 40 | TEX; 40 | PHO; 17 | HOM; 21 | 28th | 3203 | |
| 2010 | Penske Championship Racing | 77 | Dodge | DAY; 37 | CAL; 16 | LVS; 28 | ATL; 28 | BRI; 32 | MAR; 13 | PHO; 18 | TEX; 19 | TAL; 24 | RCH; 36 | DAR; 31 | DOV; 34 | CLT; 17 | POC; 11 | MCH; 26 | SON; 36 | NHA; 23 | DAY; 21 | CHI; 24 | IND; 30 | POC; 11 | GLN; 14 | MCH; 32 | BRI; 25 | ATL; 30 | RCH; 28 | NHA; 10 | DOV; 36 | KAN; 36 | CAL; 15 | CLT; 40 | MAR; 25 | TAL; 15 | TEX; 18 | PHO; 32 | HOM; 24 | 29th | 3214 | |
| 2011 | Front Row Motorsports | 38 | Ford | DAY | PHO | LVS | BRI | CAL | MAR | TEX | TAL | RCH | DAR | DOV | CLT | KAN | POC; 35 | MCH | SON | DAY | KEN | NHA | IND | POC | GLN | MCH | BRI | ATL | RCH | CHI | NHA | DOV | KAN | CLT | TAL | MAR | TEX | PHO | HOM | 70th | 0^{1} | |
| 2012 | Penske Racing | 12 | Dodge | DAY | PHO | LVS | BRI | CAL | MAR | TEX | KAN; 19 | RCH | TAL | DAR | CLT | DOV | POC | MCH | SON | KEN | | | | | | | | | | | | | | | | | | | | 59th | 0^{1} | |
| 2012 | Penske Racing | 22 | Dodge | | | | | | | | | | | | | | | | | | DAY; 33 | NHA; 22 | IND; 16 | POC; 19 | GLN; 5 | MCH; 12 | BRI; 34 | ATL; 11 | RCH; 11 | CHI; 11 | NHA; 21 | DOV; 25 | TAL; 24 | CLT; 15 | KAN; 26 | MAR; 13 | TEX; 17 | PHO; 31 | HOM; 22 | 59th | 0^{1} | |
| 2013 | Penske Racing | 12 | Ford | DAY | PHO | LVS | BRI | CAL | MAR | TEX | KAN; 37 | RCH | TAL | DAR | CLT | DOV | POC | MCH | SON | KEN | DAY | NHA | IND | POC | GLN | MCH | BRI | ATL | RCH | CHI | NHA | DOV | KAN | CLT | TAL; DNQ | MAR | TEX | PHO | HOM | 72nd | 0^{1} | |
| 2014 | Joe Gibbs Racing | 11 | Toyota | DAY | PHO | LVS | BRI | CAL; 17 | MAR | TEX | DAR | RCH | TAL | KAN | CLT | DOV | POC | MCH | SON | KEN | DAY | NHA | IND | POC | GLN | MCH | BRI | ATL | RCH | CHI | NHA | DOV | KAN | CLT | TAL | MAR | TEX | PHO | HOM | 57th | 0^{1} | |
| 2015 | Richard Petty Motorsports | 9 | Ford | DAY; 12 | ATL; 21 | LVS; 24 | PHO; 40 | CAL; 43 | MAR; 32 | TEX; 26 | BRI; 19 | RCH; 35 | TAL; 6 | KAN; 16 | CLT; 24 | DOV; 22 | POC; 41 | MCH; 26 | SON; 10 | DAY; 30 | KEN; 22 | NHA; 29 | IND; 16 | POC; 39 | GLN; 9 | MCH; 19 | BRI; 18 | DAR; 28 | RCH; 28 | CHI; 30 | NHA; 20 | DOV; 20 | CLT; 17 | KAN; 28 | TAL; 17 | MAR; 28 | TEX; 24 | PHO; 31 | HOM; 25 | 26th | 709 | |
| 2016 | Circle Sport – Leavine Family Racing | 95 | Chevy | DAY | ATL | LVS | PHO | CAL | MAR | TEX | BRI | RCH | TAL | KAN | DOV | CLT | POC | MCH | SON | DAY | KEN | NHA | IND | POC | GLN | BRI | MCH; QL^{†} | DAR | RCH | CHI | NHA | DOV | CLT | KAN | TAL | MAR | TEX | PHO | HOM | NA | - | |
^{†} - Qualified for Michael McDowell

===== Daytona 500 =====
| Year | Team | Manufacturer | Start | Finish |
|---|---|---|---|---|
| 2008 | Penske Racing South | Dodge | 19 | 15 |
| 2009 | Penske Championship Racing | Dodge | 29 | 32 |
| 2010 | Penske Championship Racing | Dodge | 36 | 37 |
| 2015 | Richard Petty Motorsports | Ford | 38 | 12 |

==== Xfinity Series ====
NASCAR Xfinity Series results
| Year | Team | No. | Make | 1 | 2 | 3 | 4 | 5 | 6 | 7 | 8 | 9 | 10 | 11 | 12 | 13 | 14 | 15 | 16 | 17 | 18 | 19 | 20 | 21 | 22 | 23 | 24 | 25 | 26 | 27 | 28 | 29 | 30 | 31 | 32 | 33 | 34 | 35 | NXSC | Pts | Ref |
|---|---|---|---|---|---|---|---|---|---|---|---|---|---|---|---|---|---|---|---|---|---|---|---|---|---|---|---|---|---|---|---|---|---|---|---|---|---|---|---|---|---|
| 2006 | Penske Racing | 39 | Dodge | DAY | CAL | MXC | LVS | ATL | BRI | TEX | NSH | PHO | TAL | RCH | DAR | CLT | DOV | NSH | KEN | MLW | DAY | CHI | NHA | MAR | GTY | IRP | GLN | MCH | BRI | CAL | RCH | DOV | KAN | CLT | MEM | TEX | PHO; 36 | HOM; 43 | 117th | 89 | |
| 2007 | Penske Racing | 12 | Dodge | DAY; 31 | CAL; 35 | MXC | LVS | ATL; 15 | BRI | NSH; 25 | TEX | PHO | TAL | RCH; 43 | DAR | CLT | DOV | NSH | KEN | MLW | NHA | DAY | CHI | GTY | IRP | CGV | GLN | MCH; 25 | BRI | CAL | RCH | DOV | KAN | CLT | MEM | TEX; 31 | PHO; 39 | HOM; 38 | 68th | 551 | |
| 2008 | Penske Racing | 12 | Dodge | DAY | CAL | LVS; DNQ | ATL | BRI; DNQ | NSH | TEX; 19 | PHO | MXC; 13 | TAL | RCH; 15 | DAR; 11 | CLT; 39 | DOV; 23 | NSH | KEN | MLW | NHA | DAY | CHI | GTY | IRP | CGV | GLN; 36 | MCH | BRI; 14 | CAL | RCH | DOV | KAN | CLT | MEM | TEX | PHO | HOM | 51st | 799 | |
| 2010 | Penske Racing | 26 | Dodge | DAY | CAL | LVS | BRI | NSH | PHO | TEX | TAL | RCH | DAR | DOV | CLT | NSH | KEN | ROA | NHA | DAY | CHI | GTY | IRP | IOW | GLN | MCH | BRI | CGV | ATL | RCH | DOV | KAN | CAL | CLT | GTY | TEX | PHO | HOM; 26 | 114th | 100 | |
| 2011 | Penske Racing | 12 | Dodge | DAY; 36 | PHO | LVS | BRI | CAL | TEX; 16 | TAL; 13 | NSH | RCH; 7 | DAR | DOV | IOW | CLT; 12 | CHI | MCH; 24 | ROA | DAY | KEN | NHA | NSH; 6 | IRP | | | | | | | CHI; 5 | DOV | KAN | CLT; 12 | TEX; 7 | PHO; 1 | HOM; 7 | | 23rd | 411 | |
| 2011 | Penske Racing | 22 | Dodge | | | | | | | | | | | | | | | | | | | | | | IOW; 24 | GLN | CGV | BRI | ATL | RCH | | | | | | | | | 23rd | 411 | |
| 2012 | Penske Racing | 12 | Dodge | DAY; 20 | PHO; 6 | LVS; 9 | BRI; 13 | CAL; 13 | TEX; 11 | RCH; 5 | TAL; 12 | DAR; 4 | IOW; 12 | CLT; 9 | DOV; 13 | MCH; 6 | ROA; 5 | KEN; 6 | DAY; 10 | NHA; 4 | CHI; 8 | IND; 2 | IOW; 3 | **GLN**; 3 | CGV; 2 | BRI; 10 | ATL; 9 | RCH; 30 | CHI; 6 | KEN; 2 | DOV; 18 | CLT; 35 | KAN; 9 | TEX; 7 | PHO; 14 | HOM; 4 | | | 4th | 1146 | |
| 2013 | Penske Racing | 12 | Ford | DAY; 2 | PHO; 7 | LVS; 1* | BRI; 4 | CAL; 2 | TEX; 34 | RCH; 7 | TAL; 25 | DAR; 8 | CLT; 12 | DOV; 7 | IOW; 4 | MCH; 32 | ROA; 5 | KEN; 9 | DAY; 7* | NHA; 7 | **CHI**; 2 | IND; 34 | IOW; 2 | **GLN**; 2 | MOH; 3 | BRI; 12 | ATL; 3 | RCH; 6 | CHI; 3 | **KEN**; 4 | DOV; 17 | KAN; 17 | CLT; 3* | TEX; 3 | PHO; 5 | **HOM**; 8 | | | 2nd | 1177 | |
| 2014 | Joe Gibbs Racing | 54 | Toyota | DAY | PHO | LVS | BRI | CAL | TEX | DAR | RCH | **TAL**; 5 | IOW; 1* | CLT | DOV | | ROA; 12* | KEN | DAY | NHA | CHI; 36 | IND | IOW; 4 | GLN | **MOH**; 30 | BRI | ATL | RCH | CHI | KEN; 30 | DOV | KAN | CLT | TEX | PHO | HOM | | | 27th | 242 | |
| 2014 | Joe Gibbs Racing | 20 | Toyota | | | | | | | | | | | | | MCH; 2 | | | | | | | | | | | | | | | | | | | | | | | 27th | 242 | |
| 2015 | Biagi-DenBeste Racing | 98 | Ford | DAY | ATL; 15 | LVS | PHO | CAL; 37 | TEX; 14 | BRI | RCH | TAL | IOW | CLT | DOV | MCH | CHI | DAY | KEN | NHA | IND | IOW | GLN | MOH | BRI | ROA | DAR | RCH | CHI | KEN | DOV | CLT | KAN | TEX | PHO | HOM | | | 99th | 0^{1} | |
| 2016 | Joe Gibbs Racing | 18 | Toyota | DAY | ATL | LVS | PHO | CAL | TEX | BRI | RCH | TAL | DOV | CLT | POC | MCH | IOW; 1* | DAY | KEN | NHA | IND | | | | | | | | | | | | | | | | | | 32nd | 157 | |
| 2016 | Richard Childress Racing | 2 | Chevy | | | | | | | | | | | | | | | | | | | IOW; 6 | GLN | **MOH**; 2 | BRI | ROA | DAR | RCH | CHI | KEN; 4 | DOV | CLT | KAN | TEX | PHO | HOM | | | 32nd | 157 | |
| 2017 | Team Penske | 22 | Ford | DAY | ATL | LVS | PHO | CAL | TEX | BRI | RCH | TAL | CLT | DOV | POC | MCH | IOW; 37 | DAY | KEN | NHA | IND | IOW; 34 | GLN | **MOH**; 1* | BRI | ROA | DAR | RCH | CHI | KEN; 31 | DOV | | | | | HOM; 2 | | | 31st | 169 | |
| 2017 | Team Penske | 12 | Ford | | | | | | | | | | | | | | | | | | | | | | | | | | | | | CLT; 2 | KAN | TEX | PHO | | | | 31st | 169 | |

==== Craftsman Truck Series ====
NASCAR Craftsman Truck Series results
| Year | Team | No. | Make | 1 | 2 | 3 | 4 | 5 | 6 | 7 | 8 | 9 | 10 | 11 | 12 | 13 | 14 | 15 | 16 | 17 | 18 | 19 | 20 | 21 | 22 | 23 | 24 | 25 | NCTC | Pts | Ref |
|---|---|---|---|---|---|---|---|---|---|---|---|---|---|---|---|---|---|---|---|---|---|---|---|---|---|---|---|---|---|---|---|
| 2008 | Bobby Hamilton Racing | 4 | Dodge | DAY | CAL | ATL | MAR | KAN | CLT | MFD | DOV | TEX | MCH | MLW | MEM | KEN | IRP | NSH | BRI | GTW | NHA | LVS | TAL | MAR; 9 | ATL | TEX | PHO | HOM | 74th | 138 | |

^{*} Season still in progress
^{1} Ineligible for series points

=== ARCA Re/Max Series ===
(key) (Bold – Pole position awarded by qualifying time. Italics – Pole position earned by points standings or practice time. * – Most laps led.)

ARCA Re/Max Series results
| Year | Team | No. | Make | 1 | 2 | 3 | 4 | 5 | 6 | 7 | 8 | 9 | 10 | 11 | 12 | 13 | 14 | 15 | 16 | 17 | 18 | 19 | 20 | 21 | 22 | 23 | ARSC | Pts | Ref |
|---|---|---|---|---|---|---|---|---|---|---|---|---|---|---|---|---|---|---|---|---|---|---|---|---|---|---|---|---|---|
| 2007 | Penske Racing | 27 | Dodge | DAY | USA | NSH | SLM | KAN | WIN | KEN | TOL | IOW | POC | **MCH**; 2 | BLN | KEN | POC | NSH | ISF | MIL | GTW | DSF | CHI | SLM | TAL | TOL | 92nd | 240 | |

=== Rolex 24 at Daytona ===
(key)

Rolex 24 at Daytona results
| Year | Class | No. | Team | Car | Co-drivers | Laps | Position | Class Position | Ref |
|---|---|---|---|---|---|---|---|---|---|
| 1999 | CA | 28 | (United States) Intersport Racing | Lola-Ford | (United States) Jon Field (United States) Ryan Jones (United States) Mike Shank | 399 | 42 ^{DNF} | 14 ^{DNF} | |
| 2007 | DP | 60 | (United States) Michael Shank Racing | Lexus Riley DP | (United States) Mark Patterson (Brazil) Oswaldo Negri Jr. (Brazil) Hélio Castroneves | 628 | 9 | 9 | |

=== International Race of Champions ===
(key) (Bold – Pole position. * – Most laps led.)

International Race of Champions results
| Year | Make | 1 | 2 | 3 | 4 | Pos. | Pts | Ref |
|---|---|---|---|---|---|---|---|---|
| 2002 | Pontiac | DAY; 2 | CAL; 11 | CHI; 6 | IND; 10 | 11th | 35 | |
| 2003 | Pontiac | DAY; 8 | TAL; 4 | CHI; 8 | IND; 11 | 8th | 30 | |
| 2006 | Pontiac | DAY; 2 | TEX; 12 | DAY; 5 | ATL; 9 | 8th | 36 | |

Sporting positions
| Preceded by Buddy Lazier; Dan Wheldon | IRL IndyCar Series Champion; 2001, 2002; 2006 | Succeeded by Scott Dixon; Dario Franchitti |
Achievements
| Preceded by Dan Wheldon | Indianapolis 500 Winner; 2006 | Succeeded by Dario Franchitti |
Awards
| Preceded by Kenny Bräck | Scott Brayton Trophy; 2006 | Succeeded by Tony Kanaan |
