= 2006 SunTrust Indy Challenge =

IndyCar race held in Richmond, Virginia

(United States) 2006 SunTrust Indy Challenge
Race details
7th round of the 2006 IndyCar season
← Previous race	Next race →
- Layout of the Richmond International Raceway circuit
- Date: June 24, 2006
- Official name: SunTrust Indy Challenge presented by XM Satellite Radio
- Location: Richmond International Raceway, Richmond, Virginia
- Course: Permanent racing facility 0.750 mi / 1.200 km
- Distance: 250 laps 187.500 mi / 301.752 km

Pole position
- Driver: (Brazil) Hélio Castroneves (Team Penske)
- Time: Field set by practice times; 15.5645

Fastest lap
- Driver: (Brazil) Hélio Castroneves (Team Penske)
- Time: 16.7234 (on lap 5 of 250)

Podium
- First: (United States) Sam Hornish Jr. (Team Penske)
- Second: (Brazil) Vítor Meira (Panther Racing)
- Third: (United Kingdom) Dario Franchitti (Andretti Green Racing)

Chronology
Previous	Next
2005	2007

The 2006 SunTrust Indy Challenge presented by XM Satellite Radio was an IndyCar Series motor race held on June 24, 2006, in Richmond, Virginia at Richmond International Raceway. It was the seventh round of the 2006 IndyCar Series and the sixth running of the event. Sam Hornish Jr. of Marlboro Team Penske won the 250-lap race. Panther Racing driver Vítor Meira finished second, and Andretti Green Racing's Dario Franchitti took third.

Hélio Castroneves was awarded the pole position after qualifications were rained out. He led the first 38 laps before teammate Hornish Jr. overtook him for the first position. Hornish Jr. proceeded to lead the final 212 laps and win the race with little vying from the other competitors. His win, coupled with Castroneves' ninth-place finish after blowing a tire late in the race, allowed him to reduce Castroneves' Drivers' Championship lead to five points. Scott Dixon and Dan Wheldon dropped to third and fourth, respectively, while Meira moved to fifth with seven races remaining in the season.

== Background ==
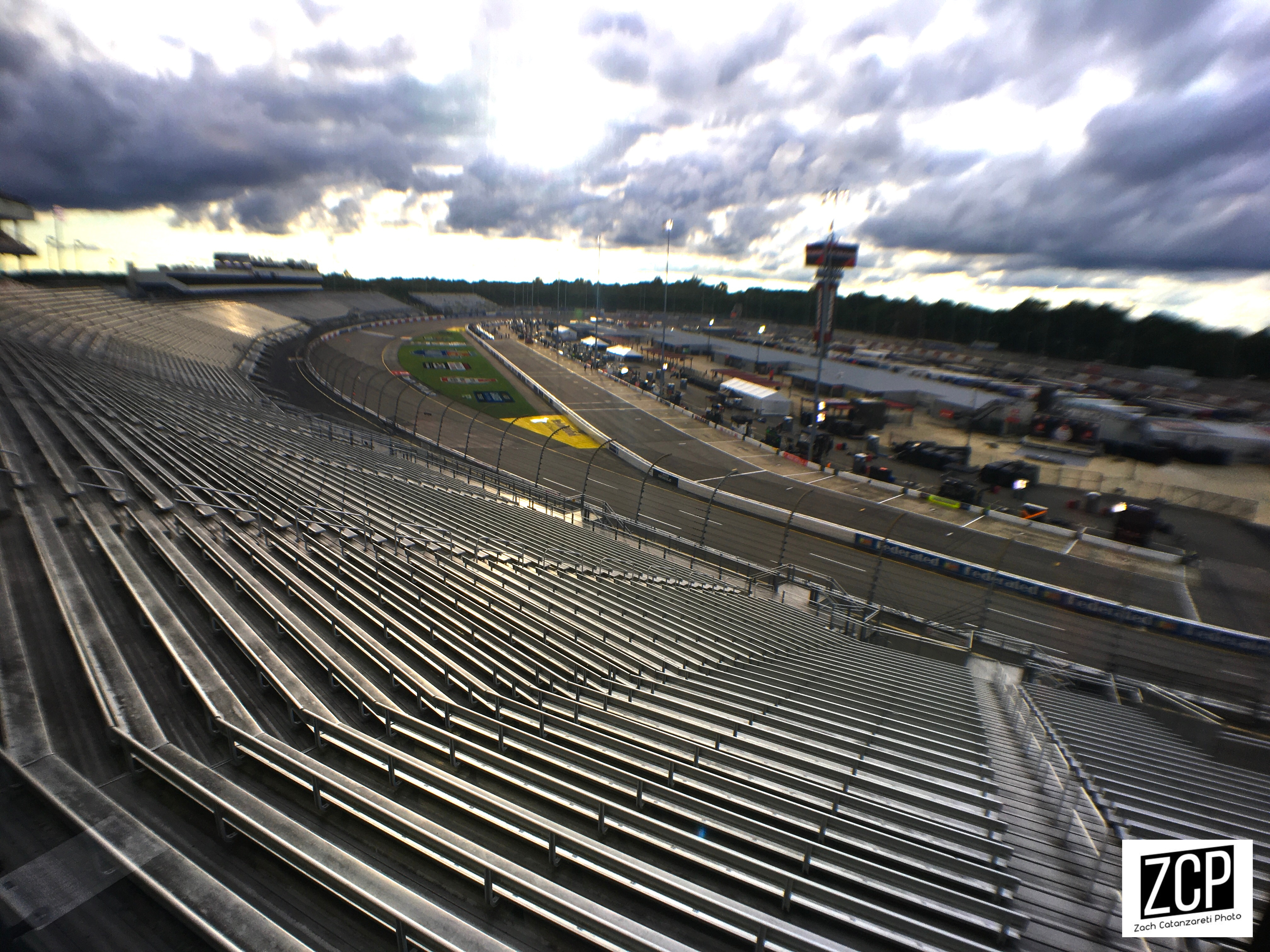
Richmond Raceway (pictured in 2020), where the race was held.

The SunTrust Indy Challenge was the seventh of 14 scheduled open-wheel races of the 2006 IndyCar Series and the sixth edition of the event. It was held on June 24, 2006, in Richmond, Virginia, United States, at Richmond International Raceway, a four-turn 0.75 mi (1.21 km) asphalt oval track which features 14-degree banking in the turns, 8-degree banking in the front stretch, and 2-degree banking in the back stretch, and contested over 250 laps and 187.5 miles (301.8 km). Before the race, Marlboro Team Penske driver Hélio Castroneves, the defending race winner, led the Drivers' Championship with 232 points, twenty-two points ahead of Scott Dixon in second and thirty-seven points over Dan Wheldon in third. Sam Hornish Jr. and Tony Kanaan held the fourth and fifth positions, respectively.

To prepare for the race, IndyCar conducted a test at the circuit for the series' entrants on June 22; the sessions were exclusively opened to rookie drivers at 9:00 AM Eastern Daylight Time (EDT), paused from 11:00 AM to 1:30 PM, opened to all drivers at 2:00 PM, and concluded at 6:00 PM. All 19 full-time entries took part in the session, which was led by Hornish Jr. with a lap of 15.7520 seconds; however, Hornish Jr. had also brought the session to an early end after crashing into the SAFER barrier in the fourth turn, destroying his primary car in the process. He was closely trailed by Andretti Green Racing drivers Marco Andretti and Kanaan, while Scott Sharp and Dario Franchitti drove the fourth- and fifth-quickest laps of the session, respectively.

Hornish Jr. looked forward to the race weekend because of how fun he felt the circuit was. Castroneves was equally as optimistic and fondly reminisced his win at the track in 2005. After the test, Andretti instantly became fond of the track because of its emphasis on driver effort. Kanaan shared this sentiment and likened Richmond International Raceway to a road course. Franchitti spoke of the physical challenges while racing at the track, such as G-forces, but had hope that he could muster another good finish in the race. Buddy Rice, on the other hand, claimed that the track was not physically demanding, but mentally demanding because it tested drivers' patience.

== Practice and qualifying ==
Two practice sessions were held prior to the race on Saturday, both on Friday. The first session lasted for 90 minutes, and the second for 60 minutes; both sessions were divided into two groups which each received equal track time. The first session featured two stoppages, one for Buddy Lazier, who backed into the fourth-turn wall, and another for Felipe Giaffone, whose engine failed just eight laps into his run. Castroneves led the first session with a quick lap of 15.6043 seconds, ahead of Andretti, Kanaan, Kosuke Matsuura, and Hornish Jr. Castroneves later improved on his fastest time during the second and final session with a lap of 15.5645 seconds, besting Scott Sharp, Hornish Jr., Wheldon, and Andretti.

Forty-five minutes after the second practice session ended, the starting grid was set to be determined by the qualifying session. Each driver was required to complete two timed laps; the fastest time would determine the drivers' starting positions. After nine drivers completed their qualifying attempts, rain began to descend over the track, forcing IndyCar to cancel the session. The starting grid was resultantly determined by the combined practice speeds on Friday, which awarded Castroneves the pole position. He was joined on the grid's front row by Sharp; Hornish Jr., Wheldon, and Andretti took positions third through fifth, and Vítor Meira, Kanaan, Matsuura, Bryan Herta, and Franchitti qualified from sixth through tenth. The grid was rounded out by Dixon, Tomas Scheckter, Ed Carpenter, Rice, Danica Patrick, Jeff Simmons, Eddie Cheever, Giaffone, and Lazier.

=== Qualifying classification ===
Pos	No.	Driver	Team	Time	Speed	Final grid
1	3	(Brazil) Hélio Castroneves	Marlboro Team Penske	15.5645	173.472	1
2	8	(United States) Scott Sharp	Delphi Fernández Racing	15.6330	172.712	2
3	6	(United States) Sam Hornish Jr.	Marlboro Team Penske	15.6466	172.561	3
4	10	(United Kingdom) Dan Wheldon	Target Chip Ganassi Racing	15.6529	172.492	4
5	26	(United States) Marco Andretti	Andretti Green Racing	15.6915	172.068	5
6	4	(Brazil) Vítor Meira	Panther Racing	15.7002	171.972	6
7	11	(Brazil) Tony Kanaan	Andretti Green Racing	15.7022	171.950	7
8	55	(Japan) Kosuke Matsuura	Super Aguri Fernández Racing	15.7158	171.802	8
9	7	(United States) Bryan Herta	Andretti Green Racing	15.7514	171.413	9
10	27	(United Kingdom) Dario Franchitti	Andretti Green Racing	15.7645	171.271	10
11	9	(New Zealand) Scott Dixon	Target Chip Ganassi Racing	15.7844	171.055	11
12	2	(South Africa) Tomas Scheckter	Vision Racing	15.8278	170.586	12
13	20	(United States) Ed Carpenter	Vision Racing	15.8310	170.551	13
14	15	(United States) Buddy Rice	Rahal Letterman Racing	15.8771	170.056	18^{1}
15	16	(United States) Danica Patrick	Rahal Letterman Racing	15.8936	169.880	14
16	17	(United States) Jeff Simmons	Rahal Letterman Racing	16.0425	168.303	15
17	51	(United States) Eddie Cheever	Cheever Racing	16.0576	168.145	16
18	14	(Brazil) Felipe Giaffone	A. J. Foyt Racing	16.5270	163.369	17
19	5	(United States) Buddy Lazier	Dreyer & Reinbold Racing	16.5290	163.349	19

Notes

- The starting grid was determined by the fastest speeds of Friday's two practice sessions.
- ^1 — Buddy Rice was sent to the rear of the grid because of a crash during the warm-up session.

== Warm-up ==
At 2:00 PM EDT, the drivers took to the track for a thirty-minute warm-up session leading up to the race. The session was briefly stopped three minutes after it began when Rice crashed into the SAFER barrier in the fourth turn. Hornish Jr. was the fastest driver of the session with a timed lap of 16.5691 seconds, ahead of Meira, Kanaan, Franchitti, and Wheldon.

== Race ==
The race began at 8:00 PM EDT and was broadcast live on ESPN2 in the United States. Commentary was provided by Marty Reid, while Scott Goodyear and Rusty Wallace took the roles of race analysts. An estimated 40,000 spectators were in attendance for the race. Weather conditions at the start of the race were cloudy, with air temperatures measuring at 81 °F (27 °C) and track temperatures at 91 °F (33 °C). After Rice's crash in the warm-up session, his team replaced his motor and he was consequently placed in the 18th starting position as per IndyCar's rules. Veteran motorsports journalist Chris Economaki commanded the drivers to start their engines and three-time Indianapolis 500 winner Johnny Rutherford drove the pace car.

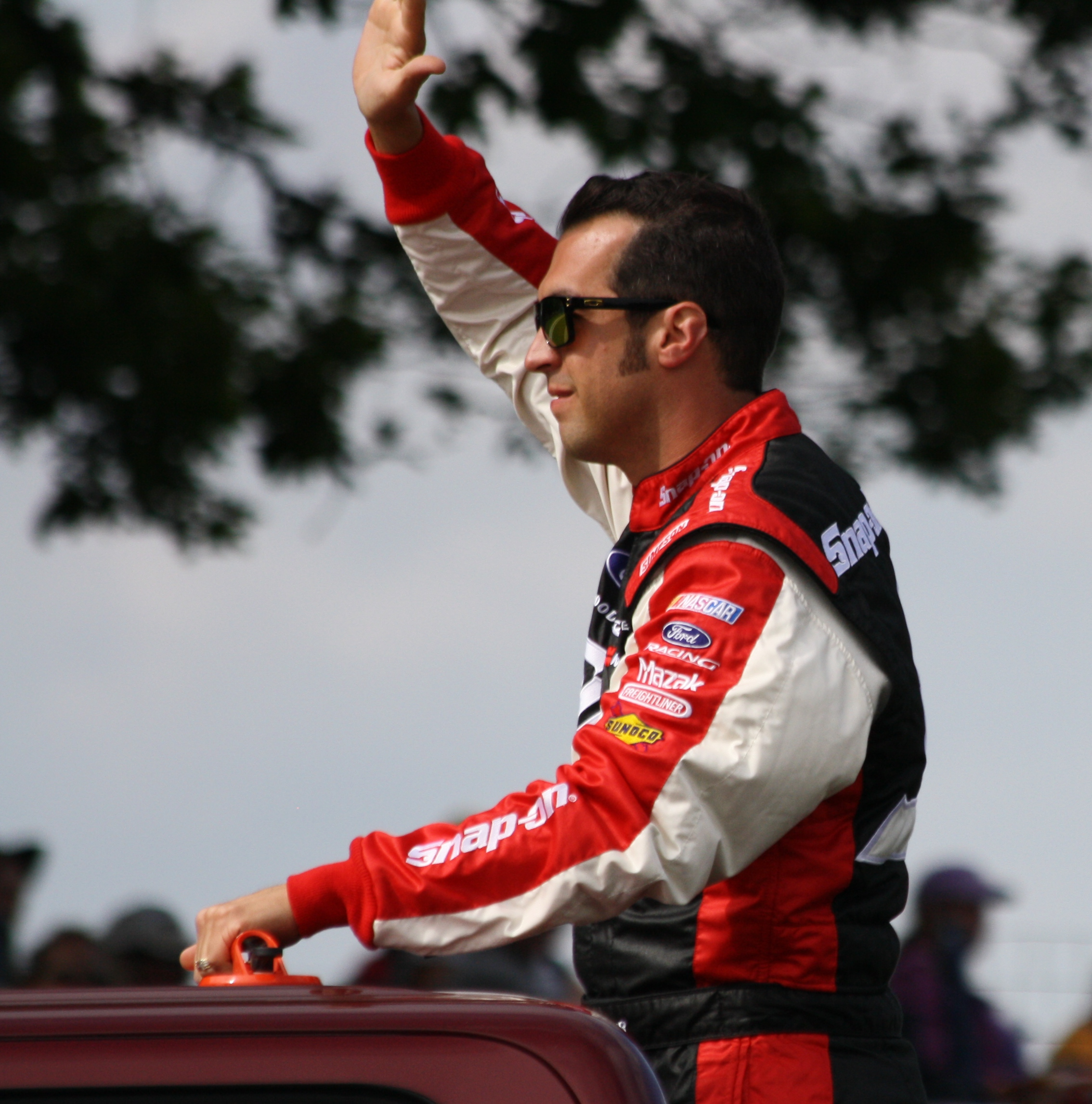
Sam Hornish Jr. (pictured in 2013) led the final 212 laps and won the race.

Castroneves utilized his pole position to his advantage when the green flag was waved and quickly began driving away from the other competitors. At the end of the first lap, Castroneves' teammate Hornish Jr. overtook Wheldon for the second position, while Andretti had also improved into the third position. Beginning on lap 15, Castroneves began maneuvering around lapped drivers, causing his gap over Hornish Jr. to dwindle within the next twenty laps. On the 39th lap, Hornish Jr. pulled ahead of Castroneves to take the lead in the first turn. Meira made his way up to the third position a lap later.

The first caution flag of the race was necessitated on lap 53, by which point Hornish Jr. had established a five-second lead over Castroneves, after debris was reported on the back stretch. All drivers chose to enter pit road for tires and fuel three laps later. Hornish Jr. and Castroneves preserved their respective positions, while Meira plummeted to tenth in the running order after his pit stop was elongated due to an issue with the impact wrench. Cheever was also sent to the rear of the field for exceeding the speed limit on pit road. Two laps after the lap 61 restart, Simmons slid up the track and crashed into the wall, bringing out the second caution and forcing him to retire. The only driver who entered pit road under this caution period was Rice, who received a beneficiary rule lap after the previous caution.

Hornish Jr. maintained the first position as the race restarted on lap 72 and amassed a 4.7-second lead over Castroneves by the 111th lap. Meanwhile, Kanaan, who was running in the fourth position, pulled off the track on lap 109 and confirmed his retirement from the race two laps later on account of a malfunctioning gear shift cable. On the 140th lap, Andretti overtook Castroneves for the second position. Eleven laps later, the third caution was displayed when debris was spotted in the second turn. Under the caution period, all drivers elected to make pit stops for new tires and fuel; some teams, including that of Hornish Jr., also made wing adjustments. Herta exited his pit stall while his fuel hose was still attached, sparking a small fire that was quickly extinguished. Franchitti's quick pit stop allowed him to advance from sixth to second.

After racing resumed on lap 164, Hornish Jr. continued his dominant pace, though he was steadily pursued by Franchitti. By virtue of lapped drivers, however, Hornish Jr. opened his gap over Franchitti to 7.6 seconds by lap 235. Meanwhile, Meira made an abrupt charge to the front of the field; he first passed Andretti for fourth place on lap 226 after Andretti oversteered and nearly spun exiting the second turn, then moved to third by overtaking Castroneves five laps later. Castroneves, meanwhile, began losing several positions after air pressure in his right-rear tire depleted. On the 240th lap, Wheldon's fuel tank ran dry because of a short pit stop on lap 153, forcing him to concede fifth place and enter pit road for a splash of fuel. Meira continued his late-race surge on lap 246 by steering to the inside on the front stretch and taking the second position from Franchitti, nearly driving into the grass in the process.

Seconds after Meira accomplished the pass, Castroneves' right-rear tire finally blew, triggering the fourth (and final) caution which proceeded in the final four laps. Hornish Jr. maintained his lead during the caution period and drove to his sixteenth IndyCar victory and second of the season, following his win in the Indianapolis 500 the month prior. Meira finished second for the sixth time in his career, ahead of Franchitti in third, Andretti in fourth, and Sharp in fifth. Herta, Scheckter, Carpenter, Wheldon, and Castroneves completed the top ten finishers and Dixon, Matsuura, Rice, Cheever, Patrick, Lazier, and Giaffone were the last of the classified finishers. The race had four cautions for 34 laps, a record-low amount for the series at the track, and one lead change among two drivers. Hornish Jr. led the final 212 laps en route to victory, marking the most consecutive laps ever led in a single IndyCar Series race.

=== Post-race ===
Hornish Jr. drove to victory lane to celebrate his win with his team; the win earned him $125,800 and Honda their 100th victory in American open-wheel racing. In victory lane, Hornish Jr. was pleased with the win, stating: "We had a great race all the way through the beginning. Our focus for tonight was just make sure that we ran a calm, clean race and make sure we don't get into any problems out here. The last two years I either got hit or spun out trying to get around Hélio (Castroneves)." Hornish Jr. also said his team jokingly allowed him to wreck their cars, so long as he continued winning races. Meira was similarly proud of his performance and said: "Doing what we did today, everybody saw what myself and Panther Racing are capable of. [...] It's just amazing what we did today, falling back twice after (poor) pit stops and being able to recover on such a difficult track to overtake.” Regarding his pass for second, he praised Franchitti for giving him enough room to drive, calling him "professional."

Franchitti, who finished third, lauded Meira for his pass on lap 246, but criticized race officials for being unhelpful as he negotiated around lapped drivers: "What was upsetting me was that Sam (Hornish Jr.) was getting the blue flag to help him get through traffic. It appears that the Klein Tools/Canadian Club car was invisible to the flagman. There were no blue flags all night, no help at all from the flagstand. The backmarkers did more to help me than they did." Nevertheless, Franchitti said he had a "wonderful time" during the race. Fourth-place finisher Andretti wished he could have competed for the win, but was grateful that he finished the race without wrecking, admitting the car was "a handful at times." After finishing fifth, Sharp hoped he could keep his streak of top-five finishes intact after the race at Kansas Speedway, although he felt that his car had tightened and lost speed after his final pit stop. Castroneves, who maintained his Drivers' Championship lead with 252 points, said his car initially drove great but loosened as he approached lapped drivers. He was trailed by teammate Hornish Jr. with 247 points. Dixon, with 229 points, fell to third, while Wheldon dropped to fourth with 217. Meira improved one spot in fifth with 192 points.

=== Race classification ===
Pos	No.	Driver	Team	Laps	Time/Retired	Grid	Laps Led	Pts.
1	6	(United States) Sam Hornish Jr.	Marlboro Team Penske	250	01:26:49.4669	3	212	53^{2}
2	4	(Brazil) Vítor Meira	Panther Racing	250	+0.3907	6	0	40
3	27	(United Kingdom) Dario Franchitti	Andretti Green Racing	250	+1.5895	10	0	35
4	26	(United States) Marco Andretti	Andretti Green Racing	250	+6.5400	5	0	32
5	8	(United States) Scott Sharp	Delphi Fernández Racing	250	+6.6677	2	0	30
6	7	(United States) Bryan Herta	Andretti Green Racing	250	+10.9217	9	0	28
7	2	(South Africa) Tomas Scheckter	Vision Racing	249	+1 Lap	12	0	26
8	20	(United States) Ed Carpenter	Vision Racing	249	+1 Lap	13	0	24
9	10	(United Kingdom) Dan Wheldon	Target Chip Ganassi Racing	249	+1 Lap	4	0	22
10	3	(Brazil) Hélio Castroneves	Marlboro Team Penske	249	+1 Lap	1	38	20
11	9	(New Zealand) Scott Dixon	Target Chip Ganassi Racing	249	+1 Lap	11	0	19
12	55	(Japan) Kosuke Matsuura	Super Aguri Fernández Racing	247	+3 Laps	8	0	18
13	15	(United States) Buddy Rice	Rahal Letterman Racing	247	+3 Laps	18	0	17
14	51	(United States) Eddie Cheever	Cheever Racing	246	+4 Laps	16	0	16
15	16	(United States) Danica Patrick	Rahal Letterman Racing	246	+4 Laps	14	0	15
16	5	(United States) Buddy Lazier	Dreyer & Reinbold Racing	245	+5 Laps	19	0	14
17	14	(Brazil) Felipe Giaffone	A. J. Foyt Racing	244	+6 Laps	17	0	13
18	11	(Brazil) Tony Kanaan	Andretti Green Racing	109	Gearbox	7	0	12
19	17	(United States) Jeff Simmons	Rahal Letterman Racing	59	Accident	15	0	12

Notes

- ^2 — Includes three bonus points for leading the most laps.

== Championship standings after the race ==
Drivers' Championship standings

	Pos.	Driver	Points
Unchanged	1	(Brazil) Hélio Castroneves	252
2	2	(United States) Sam Hornish Jr.	247 (–5)
1	3	(New Zealand) Scott Dixon	229 (–23)
1	4	(United Kingdom) Dan Wheldon	217 (–35)
1	5	(Brazil) Vítor Meira	192 (–60)

- Note: Only the top five positions are included.

Previous race: 2006 Bombardier Learjet 500	IndyCar Series; 2006 season	Next race: 2006 Kansas Lottery Indy 300
Previous race: 2005 SunTrust Indy Challenge	SunTrust Indy Challenge	Next race: 2007 SunTrust Indy Challenge
