= 2006 Kansas Lottery Indy 300 =

IndyCar race held in Kansas City, Kansas

(United States) 2006 Kansas Lottery Indy 300
Race details
8th round of the 2006 IndyCar season
← Previous race	Next race →
- Layout of the Kansas Speedway circuit
- Date: July 2, 2006
- Official name: Kansas Lottery Indy 300
- Location: Kansas Speedway, Kansas City, Kansas
- Course: Permanent racing facility 1.500 mi / 2.400 km
- Distance: 200 laps 300.000 mi / 482.803 km

Pole position
- Driver: (United Kingdom) Dan Wheldon (Chip Ganassi Racing)
- Time: 25.6257

Fastest lap
- Driver: (Brazil) Hélio Castroneves (Team Penske)
- Time: 25.9847 (on lap 200 of 200)

Podium
- First: (United States) Sam Hornish Jr. (Team Penske)
- Second: (United Kingdom) Dan Wheldon (Chip Ganassi Racing)
- Third: (Brazil) Vítor Meira (Panther Racing)

Chronology
Previous	Next
2005	2007

The 2006 Kansas Lottery Indy 300 was an IndyCar Series motor race held on July 2, 2006, in Kansas City, Kansas at Kansas Speedway. It was the eighth round of the 2006 IndyCar Series and the sixth running of the event. Sam Hornish Jr., driving for Marlboro Team Penske, won the 200-lap race. Target Chip Ganassi Racing driver Dan Wheldon finished second, and Vítor Meira of Panther Racing finished third.

Wheldon, who won the pole position in qualifying, led the first six laps before Hornish Jr. got by him on lap 7. Hornish Jr. went on to lead the next 34 laps before a caution period placed him in the second position behind Scott Dixon, who had a faster pit stop than him. Hornish Jr. quickly overtook him on the restart and led 99 of the next 102 laps, only being challenged by Wheldon. After the sole round of green-flag pit stop concluded on the 155th lap, Wheldon claimed the first position and held it until lap 184, when he was overtaken by Hornish Jr. shortly after a restart. Wheldon stayed close behind Hornish Jr. for the final fifteen laps and even took the lead for two laps, but Hornish Jr. ultimately held him off and won the race. There were four cautions for 31 laps and 13 lead changes among four drivers throughout the race.

With Hornish Jr. taking the victory and his teammate Castroneves finishing sixth, Hornish Jr. surged 20 points ahead of Castroneves in the Drivers’ Championship. Dixon, Wheldon, and Meira retained their third-to-fifth positions with six races left in the season.

== Background ==
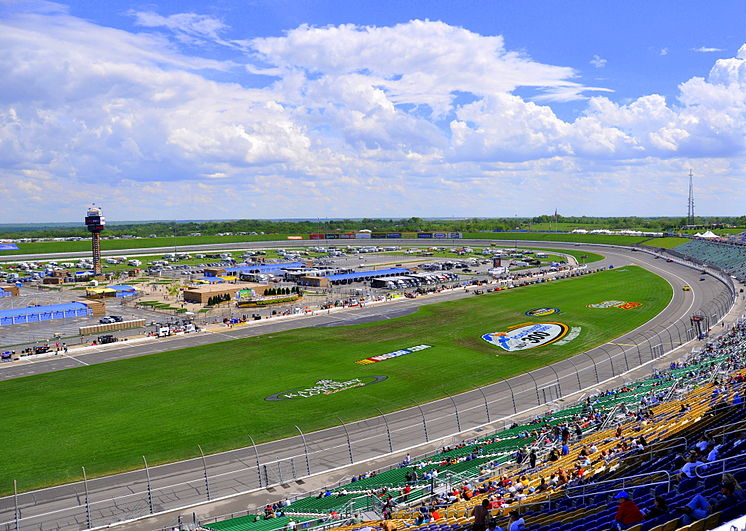
Kansas Speedway (pictured in 2010), where the race was held.

The Kansas Lottery Indy 300 was the eighth of 14 scheduled open-wheel races for the 2006 IndyCar Series and the sixth edition of the event dating back to 2001. It was held on July 2, 2006, in Kansas City, Kansas, United States, at Kansas Speedway, a four-turn 1.5 mi (2.4 km) asphalt tri-oval circuit which features 15-degree banking in the turns, 10.4-degree banking in the front stretch, and 5-degree banking in the back stretch, and contested over 200 laps and 300 miles (480 km). Heading into the race, Hélio Castroneves led the Drivers' Championship with 252 points, five more than Sam Hornish Jr. in second and twenty-three more than Scott Dixon in third; Dan Wheldon was fourth with 217 points, ahead of Vítor Meira with 192 points. Tony Kanaan was the race's defending champion.

In preparation for the race, the Indy Racing League conducted a six-hour test at the track for the IndyCar Series teams on June 13. All 19 full-time teams participated in the test, with the exception of Scott Sharp, who privately tested for Firestone with Dixon the day prior, and Felipe Giaffone. Dixon led the incident-free test session with a fastest lap time of 25.3309 seconds, besting Wheldon, Hornish Jr., Castroneves, and Kosuke Matsuura.

Hornish Jr., who finished second at Kansas Speedway in 2001 and 2002, hoped to "take the next step" and earn a victory at the track. Castroneves was content with his speed during the test and optimistic for the race. After a good finish in the previous race at Richmond International Raceway, Marco Andretti felt the speed he achieved in the test was underwhelming, but looked forward to racing at Kansas. Kanaan, who failed to finish the Richmond race, ensured that drivers would be forced to deal with hot temperatures: "If you are in good shape it doesn't really bother you physically, but it does cause the car to lose grip and you have to be smart when you try to compensate for it with your car setup." Sharp expressed enthusiasm for the race following his two consecutive top-five finishes at Texas Motor Speedway and Richmond.

== Practice and qualifying ==
Two practice sessions preceded the race on Sunday: both were held on Saturday, lasted for 90 minutes, and divided into two groups which each received 45 minutes of track time. A thirty-minute warm-up session was also held on Sunday morning. In the first practice session, Wheldon was fastest with a time of 25.7194 seconds, succeeding the fastest laps of Hornish Jr., Matsuura, Dixon, and Meira. Meira led the second practice session later that day with a 25.7001-second lap, ahead of Wheldon, Dixon, Hornish Jr., and Matsuura.

The qualifying session was held an hour after the second practice session ended. Each driver was required to complete two timed laps, with the fastest of the two laps determining their starting position. Wheldon earned the third pole position of his career and his first since 2004 with a time of 25.6257 seconds. He was joined on the grid's front row by Hornish Jr., who trailed Wheldon by 0.0196 seconds. Dixon qualified third, Castroneves fourth, and Matsuura fifth. Meira, Buddy Lazier, Tomas Scheckter, Buddy Rice, and Sharp took positions sixth through tenth, and Andretti, Danica Patrick, Kanaan, Dario Franchitti, Bryan Herta, Ed Carpenter, Jeff Simmons, Giaffone, and Eddie Cheever completed the starting grid. Carpenter only completed one lap in his qualifying attempt after his car was pulled into the garage to mend a water leak. In the warm-up session the next morning, Castroneves posted the fastest lap of 25.7892 seconds; Hornish Jr. was second, Dixon third, Matsuura fourth, and Wheldon fifth.

=== Qualifying classification ===
Pos	No.	Driver	Team	Time	Speed	Final grid
1	10	(United Kingdom) Dan Wheldon	Target Chip Ganassi Racing	25.6257	213.536	1
2	6	(United States) Sam Hornish Jr.	Marlboro Team Penske	25.6453	213.372	2
3	9	(New Zealand) Scott Dixon	Target Chip Ganassi Racing	25.7466	212.533	3
4	3	(Brazil) Hélio Castroneves	Marlboro Team Penske	25.7540	212.472	4
5	55	(Japan) Kosuke Matsuura	Super Aguri Fernández Racing	25.7622	212.404	5
6	4	(Brazil) Vítor Meira	Panther Racing	25.7936	212.146	6
7	5	(United States) Buddy Lazier	Dreyer & Reinbold Racing	25.9692	210.711	7
8	2	(South Africa) Tomas Scheckter	Vision Racing	26.0065	210.409	8
9	15	(United States) Buddy Rice	Rahal Letterman Racing	26.0092	210.387	9
10	8	(United States) Scott Sharp	Delphi Fernández Racing	26.0096	210.384	10
11	26	(United States) Marco Andretti	Andretti Green Racing	26.0716	209.884	11
12	16	(United States) Danica Patrick	Rahal Letterman Racing	26.1199	209.495	12
13	11	(Brazil) Tony Kanaan	Andretti Green Racing	26.1358	209.368	13
14	27	(United Kingdom) Dario Franchitti	Andretti Green Racing	26.1398	209.336	14
15	7	(United States) Bryan Herta	Andretti Green Racing	26.1789	209.023	15
16	20	(United States) Ed Carpenter	Vision Racing	26.2284	208.629	16
17	17	(United States) Jeff Simmons	Rahal Letterman Racing	26.2300	208.616	17
18	14	(Brazil) Felipe Giaffone	A. J. Foyt Racing	26.3825	207.410	18
19	51	(United States) Eddie Cheever	Cheever Racing	26.4321	207.021	19

== Race ==
Live coverage of the race began at 12:00 PM Central Daylight Time (CDT) in the United States on ABC. Commentary was provided by Marty Reid, Rusty Wallace, and Scott Goodyear. Weather conditions at the start of the race were muggy, with air temperatures reaching 93 °F (34 °C) and track temperatures measuring at 128 °F (53 °C). Kathleen Sebelius, the governor of Kansas, commanded the drivers to start their engines and three-time Indianapolis 500 winner Johnny Rutherford drove the pace car. When the race began, Wheldon maintained his pole position advantage and led the first lap of the race. Castroneves concurrently pulled ahead of Hornish Jr. for second place on the outside line, though he was quickly overtaken by Hornish Jr., while Kanaan passed six drivers to move into the seventh position; by the fifth lap, he had improved to fifth. Two laps later, Hornish Jr. drove to the outside of Wheldon in turn one and completed the pass for the lead in turn three.

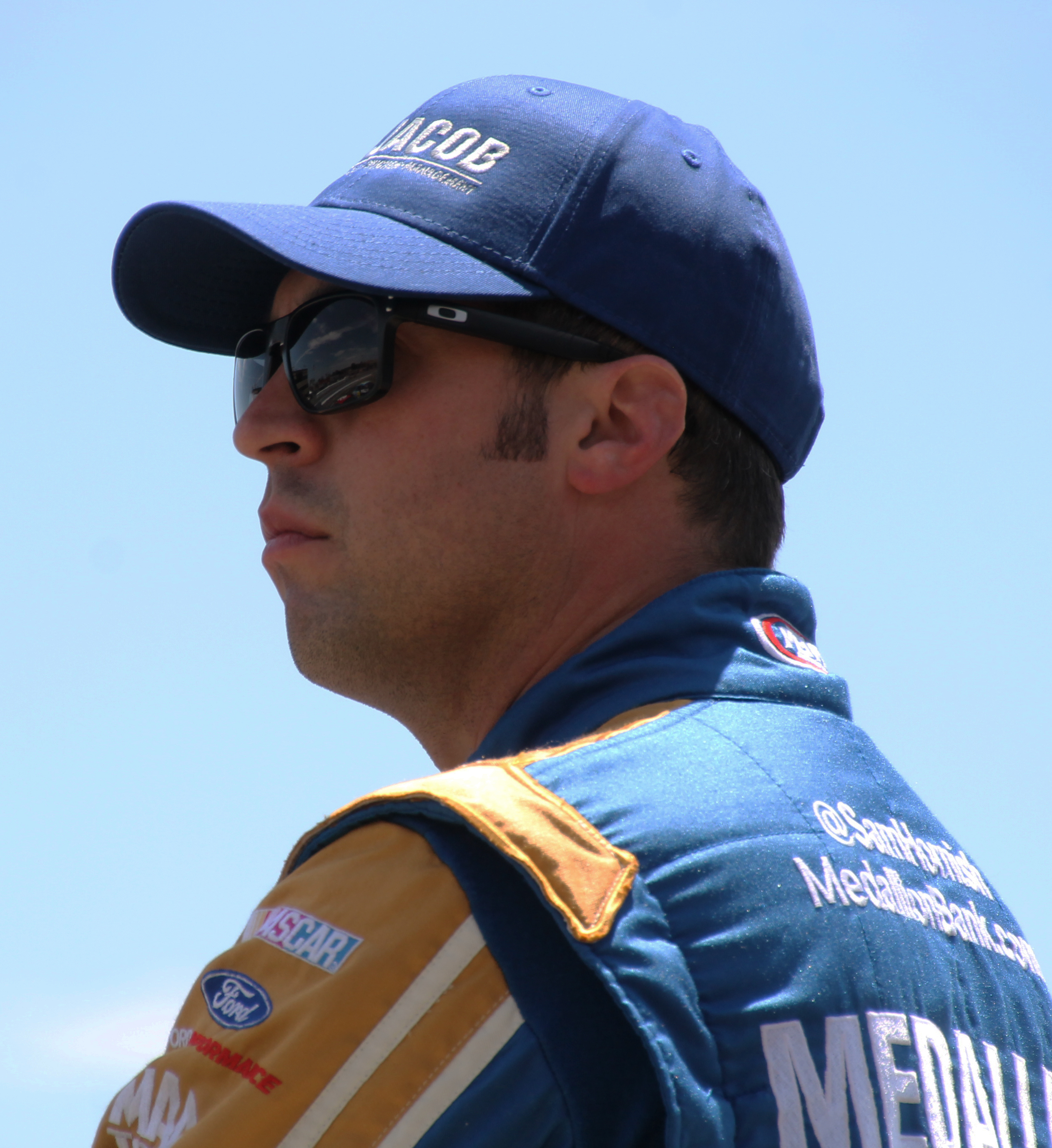
Sam Hornish Jr. (pictured in 2015) won the race after passing Dan Wheldon with two laps remaining.

Over the next thirty laps, Dixon and Wheldon exchanged the second position, allowing Hornish Jr. to open his lead to 2.3 seconds. The first caution flag was issued on lap 37 when Castroneves slid backwards into the outside SAFER barrier in turn four, damaging the rear wing of his car. All the leaders chose to make pit stops during the caution period, including Dixon, who passed Hornish Jr. for the lead on pit road. Castroneves' team was able to repair his wing without being lapped. Simmons was sent to the back of the line for exceeding the pit road speed limit and Franchitti was handed a drive-through penalty for passing Dixon under the caution. Dixon led the field on the lap-45 restart, though he was immediately passed by Hornish Jr. and Wheldon. Hornish Jr. lengthened his gap over Wheldon to 1.2 seconds by lap 85. During this green-flag stint, Giaffone became the first retiree of the race on lap 66 because of an ill-handling car. On the 89th lap, the second caution was issued when debris was spotted in turn three. All the leaders elected to make pit stops for tires, fuel, and adjustments.

At the restart on lap 99, Wheldon nosed by Hornish Jr. to lead the lap, but Hornish Jr. passed him on the next lap. Wheldon retained Hornish Jr.'s draft and closely pursued him until the 138th lap, when he drove up the track to pass him. He led the next two laps before Hornish Jr. pulled away from him again. Nine laps later, Hornish Jr. kicked off the first (and only) cycle of green-flag pit stops when he made a pit stop for four tires and fuel, conceding the lead to Wheldon, who remained on the track until the 154th lap. The pit stops concluded after Sharp, who had taken the lead from Wheldon, entered pit road a lap later, giving the lead back to Wheldon. In the ten laps that followed, Wheldon sustained a 1.2-second lead over Hornish Jr. until the third caution was flown when ninth-place driver Sharp's suspension failed, causing him to spin into the wall in the third and fourth turns. Sharp climbed from his car and retired from the race.

Because of the recent green-flag pit stops, all the leaders chose to remain on the track. The fourth (and final) caution was displayed a lap after the restart on lap 175 when Rice spun backwards into the turn-four wall; he became the third retiree of the race. Castroneves elected to make a pit stop under this caution from the fourth position for tires and downforce. Wheldon led the field back up to speed at the lap-183 restart, while Meira passed Dixon for fourth place. On the next lap, Hornish Jr. drove to the outside line and overtook Wheldon for the lead. Hornish Jr. held a 0.4-second lead over Wheldon on the 185th lap, but within the next five laps, Wheldon closed Hornish Jr.'s gap. As Meira advanced to the third position, Wheldon drove up the track in an effort to pass Hornish Jr. on lap 197. He briefly succeeded, leading both that and the next lap by less than a tenth of a second. Despite Wheldon’s best efforts, Hornish Jr. retook the lead with two laps remaining and secured the win on his 27th birthday. Wheldon finished second, ahead of Meira in third, Dixon in fourth, and Kanaan in fifth. The top ten finishers were completed by Castroneves, Scheckter, Matsuura, Andretti, and Simmons, while Patrick, Franchitti, Herta, Cheever, Lazier, and Carpenter were the last of the classified finishers.

=== Post-race ===
Hornish Jr. appeared in victory lane to celebrate his third win of the season and his birthday with his team; the win earned him $125,800. Hornish Jr. was pleased with his victory and described how his car drove throughout the race: "We had a good car all day long. The Marlboro Team Penske car was good on the bottom and good on the top. We put on a good show for the fans at the end of the race." Second-place finisher Wheldon was frustrated about losing yet another race: "I'm just disappointed to come up short again. We gave everything we had." However, he also felt that Hornish Jr. deserved to win because "mechanically his car was working a little better." Meira, who finished third, was happy with his performance during the race: "We improved what we had during the race and we were the best at the end, which is how you want it to be. This is great for Panther Racing, everybody on this team has so much passion about what we are doing."

Dixon, who finished fourth, was unhappy with how the final restart unfolded and believed that if he did not struggle with oversteer, he could have finished higher. Kanaan noted that while his car handled well, he could only pass other drivers during restarts, and so he aimed to exploit that. After finishing seventh, Scheckter wished that another caution had flown in the closing laps in order for him to compete with the leaders, but was pleased with his finish and hoped to keep his momentum going at Nashville Superspeedway. Regarding his lap-175 accident, Rice was saddened by the amount of times he and his teammates had wrecked throughout the season. Sharp, who wrecked ten laps earlier, thought his car was far too tight at the beginning. After multiple front wing adjustments, he finally obtained speed and began passing his competitors only to crash. The final result put Hornish Jr., with 300 points, into the Drivers’ Championship lead, overtaking his teammate Castroneves, who trailed by twenty points. Dixon maintained third with 261 points, and Wheldon, with 257 points, and Meira, with 227 points, rounded out the top five.

=== Race classification ===
Pos	No.	Driver	Team	Laps	Time/Retired	Grid	Laps Led	Pts.
1	6	(United States) Sam Hornish Jr.	Marlboro Team Penske	200	01:49:00.3423	2	149	53^{1}
2	10	(United Kingdom) Dan Wheldon	Target Chip Ganassi Racing	200	+0.0793	1	45	40
3	4	(Brazil) Vítor Meira	Panther Racing	200	+5.3892	6	0	35
4	9	(New Zealand) Scott Dixon	Target Chip Ganassi Racing	200	+5.5158	3	5	32
5	11	(Brazil) Tony Kanaan	Andretti Green Racing	200	+5.7762	13	0	30
6	3	(Brazil) Hélio Castroneves	Marlboro Team Penske	200	+7.0432	4	0	28
7	2	(South Africa) Tomas Scheckter	Vision Racing	200	+9.6925	8	0	26
8	55	(Japan) Kosuke Matsuura	Super Aguri Fernández Racing	200	+9.9881	5	0	24
9	26	(United States) Marco Andretti	Andretti Green Racing	199	+1 Lap	11	0	22
10	17	(United States) Jeff Simmons	Rahal Letterman Racing	199	+1 Lap	17	0	20
11	16	(United States) Danica Patrick	Rahal Letterman Racing	198	+2 Laps	12	0	19
12	27	(United Kingdom) Dario Franchitti	Andretti Green Racing	198	+2 Laps	14	0	18
13	7	(United States) Bryan Herta	Andretti Green Racing	197	+3 Laps	15	0	17
14	51	(United States) Eddie Cheever	Cheever Racing	196	+4 Laps	19	0	16
15	5	(United States) Buddy Lazier	Dreyer & Reinbold Racing	194	+6 Laps	7	0	15
16	20	(United States) Ed Carpenter	Vision Racing	184	+16 Laps	16	0	14
17	15	(United States) Buddy Rice	Rahal Letterman Racing	174	Accident	9	0	13
18	8	(United States) Scott Sharp	Delphi Fernández Racing	165	Accident	10	1	12
19	14	(Brazil) Felipe Giaffone	A. J. Foyt Racing	66	Handling	18	0	12

Notes

- ^1 — Includes three bonus points for leading the most laps.

== Championship standings after the race ==
Drivers' Championship standings
	Pos.	Driver	Points
1	1	(United States) Sam Hornish Jr.	300
1	2	(Brazil) Hélio Castroneves	280 (–20)
Unchanged	3	(New Zealand) Scott Dixon	261 (–39)
Unchanged	4	(United Kingdom) Dan Wheldon	257 (–43)
Unchanged	5	(Brazil) Vítor Meira	227 (–73)
Sources:

- Note: Only the top five positions are included.

Previous race: 2006 SunTrust Indy Challenge	IndyCar Series; 2006 season	Next race: 2006 Firestone Indy 200
Previous race: 2005 Argent Mortgage Indy 300	Kansas Lottery Indy 300	Next race: 2007 Kansas Lottery Indy 300
