= G-Force GF09 =

G-Force GF09 G-Force GF09B Panoz GF09C
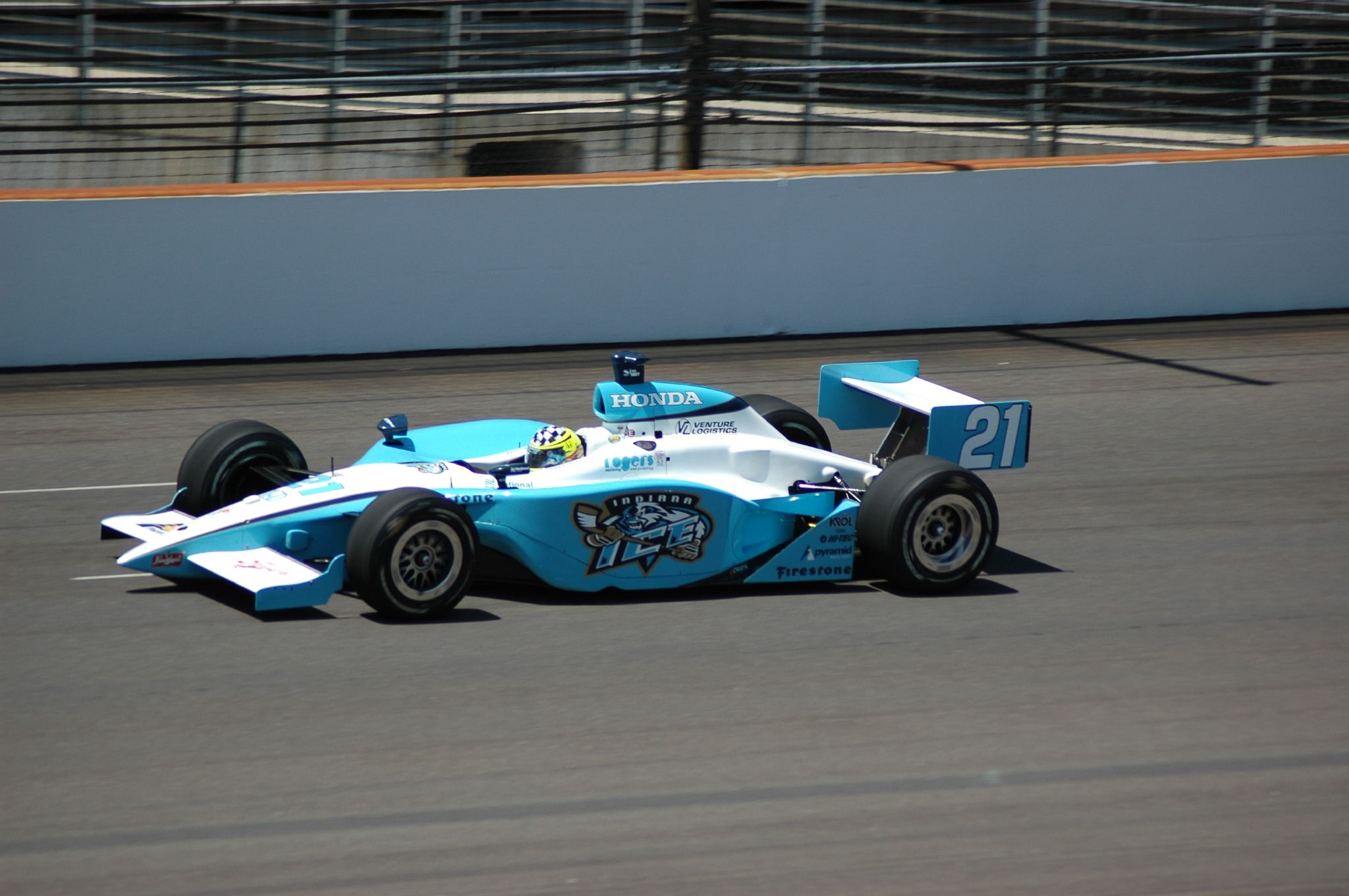
- Jaques Lazier drives his Panoz GF09-Honda during 2007 Indianapolis 500 qualification
- Category: IndyCar Series
- Constructor: (United States) Élan Motorsport Technologies (United States) G-Force Technologies
- Designers: Simon Marshall; Nick Alcock
- Predecessor: G-Force GF05

Technical specifications
- Chassis: Carbon fiber monocoque with honeycomb kevlar structure
- Suspension: Pushrod with multilink
- Length: 4,877 mm (192 in)
- Width: 1,968 mm (77 in) minimum 1,994 mm (79 in) maximum
- Height: 965 mm (38 in)
- Axle track: Front: 1,702–1,722 mm (67–68 in); Rear: 1,613 mm (64 in)
- Wheelbase: 3,048 mm (120 in), plus or minus 51.5 mm (2997-3100 mm (118-122 mm))
- Engine: Toyota Indy V8; Honda Indy HI7R V8 3.5 L (3,500 cc; 214 cu in) (2003, 2007-2008); 3.0 L (3,000 cc; 183 cu in) (2004-2006) V8 90° naturally-aspirated, mid-engined, longitudinally-mounted
- Transmission: Xtrac #P295 6-speed sequential manual gearbox (2003-2007), semi-automatic paddle-shift gearbox (2008) Adjustable spool type
- Power: 650 hp (485 kW)
- Weight: 1,565 lb (710 kg) on short, intermediate speedway oval and Indianapolis 500; 1,640 lb (744 kg) on road and street courses Including driver, fuel and all lubricants and coolants
- Fuel: 100% fuel grade Ethanol
- Tyres: Firestone Firehawk dry slick and rain treaded tires O.Z. racing, BBS wheels

Competition history
- Notable entrants: (United States) American Dream Motorsports; (United States) Chastain Motorsports; (United States) PDM Racing; (United States) Cabbie Motorsports
- Notable drivers: (United States) Jaques Lazier; (United States) Phil Giebler; (Brazil) Roberto Moreno; (France) Stéphan Grégoire; (United States) Jimmy Kite
- Debut: 2003 Toyota Indy 300
| Races | Wins | Poles |
|---|---|---|
| 58 | 7 | 7 |
- Constructors' Championships: 0
- Drivers' Championships: 1 (2003: Scott Dixon)

The G-Force GF09 is a racing car developed and produced by American manufacturer Élan Motorsport Technologies for Panoz, with original work having been performed by G-Force Technologies prior to its purchase by Panoz, for use in the IndyCar Series. A subsequent version that saw the greatest usage in IndyCar racing was the G-Force GF09B with the Panoz GF09C following.

The GF09's last appearance was in practice for the 2008 Indianapolis 500 when Phil Giebler, who drove for American Dream Motorsports, crashed his Panoz chassis and failed to qualify. Panoz effectively discontinued their IndyCar Series involvement after the 2008 season due to all IndyCar Series teams opting for the Dallara IR-05 chassis, and Panoz concentrated on sports car endurance racing.

The G-Force GF09 IndyCar, later branded as Panoz GF09, primarily saw success in the 2003 and 2004 Indianapolis 500 races. In 2003, Gil de Ferran won the Indianapolis 500 with a G-Force GF09, and in 2004, Buddy Rice won with the same car. The GF09 chassis also helped Scott Dixon win the 2003 IndyCar championship.

== Complete IndyCar Series results ==
(key) (Results in bold indicate pole position; results in italics indicate fastest lap)

| Year | Entrants | Chassis | Engines | Tyres | Drivers | No. | 1 | 2 | 3 | 4 | 5 | 6 | 7 | 8 | 9 | 10 | 11 | 12 | 13 | 14 | 15 | 16 | 17 |
|---|---|---|---|---|---|---|---|---|---|---|---|---|---|---|---|---|---|---|---|---|---|---|---|
| 2003 | Ganassi Racing | G-Force GF09 | Toyota Indy V8 | F | | | HMS | PHX | MOT | INDY | TXS | PPIR | RIR | KAN | NSH | MCH | GAT | KTY | NAZ | CHI | FON | TXS | |
| 2003 | Ganassi Racing | G-Force GF09 | Toyota Indy V8 | F | (New Zealand) Scott Dixon | 9 | 1 | 20 | **15** | 17 | 6 | 1* | **1*** | **6** | **2** | 5 | 15 | 2 | **16** | 2 | 2 | 2 | |
| 2003 | Ganassi Racing | G-Force GF09 | Toyota Indy V8 | F | (South Africa) Tomas Scheckter | 10 | 8 | 15 | 16 | 4* | **18*** | 8 | 18 | 9 | 10 | **3** | 4 | 10 | 19 | 5* | 5* | 15 | |
| 2003 | Team Penske | G-Force GF09 | Toyota Indy V8 | F | (Brazil) Gil de Ferran | 6 | | | | 1 | 8 | | | | | | | | | | 15 | | |
| 2003 | A. J. Foyt Enterprises | G-Force GF09 | Toyota Indy V8 | F | (Japan) Shigeaki Hattori | 5 | 18 | | 20 | | | | | | | | | | | | | | |
| 2003 | A. J. Foyt Enterprises | G-Force GF09 | Toyota Indy V8 | F | (United States) A. J. Foyt IV | 14 | | | 18 | | 21 | | 21 | 15 | | 14 | | 17 | | | 17 | 22 | |
| 2003 | A. J. Foyt Enterprises | G-Force GF09 | Toyota Indy V8 | F | (Brazil) Airton Daré | 41 | | | | 24 | | | | | | | | | | | | | |
| 2003 | Mo Nunn Racing | G-Force GF09 | Toyota Indy V8 | F | (Japan) Toranosuke Takagi | 12 | 12 | 22 | 8 | 5 | 3 | 6 | 13 | 18 | 7 | 6 | 7 | 18 | 14 | 9 | 18 | 7 | |
| 2003 | Mo Nunn Racing | G-Force GF09 | Toyota Indy V8 | F | (Netherlands) Arie Luyendyk | 20 | | | | DNQ | | | | | | | | | | | | | |
| 2003 | Mo Nunn Racing | G-Force GF09 | Toyota Indy V8 | F | (Brazil) Felipe Giaffone | 21 | 9 | 3 | 3 | 33 | 17 | 13 | 6 | 22 | | | | | | 15 | 16 | 19 | |
| 2003 | Mo Nunn Racing | G-Force GF09 | Toyota Indy V8 | F | (United States) Alex Barron | 21 | | | | | | | | | 5 | 1 | 16 | 20 | 15 | | | | |
| 2003 | Sam Schmidt Motorsports | G-Force GF09 | Toyota Indy V8 | F | (United States) Richie Hearn | 99 | | | | 28 | | | | | | | | | | | | | |
| 2003 | Access Motorsports | G-Force GF09 | Honda HI3R V8 | F | (United States) Greg Ray | | | 9 | 8 | 11 | 18 | 12 | 8 | 16 | 10 | 8 | 15 | 17 | DNS | 14 | 8 | | |
| 2004 | Target Chip Ganassi Racing | G-Force GF09B | Toyota Indy V8 | F | | | HMS | PHX | MOT | INDY | TXS | RIR | KAN | NSH | MIL | MCH | KTY | PPIR | NAZ | CHI | FON | TXS | |
| 2004 | Target Chip Ganassi Racing | G-Force GF09B | Toyota Indy V8 | F | (New Zealand) Scott Dixon | 1 | 18 | 2 | 5 | 8 | 14 | 8 | 12 | 8 | DNS | 7 | 13 | 20 | 9 | 7 | 8 | 6 | |
| 2004 | Target Chip Ganassi Racing | G-Force GF09B | Toyota Indy V8 | F | (United Kingdom) Darren Manning | 10 | 6 | 5 | 4 | 25 | 8 | 20 | 11 | 4 | 19 | 13 | 10 | 4 | 6 | 15 | DNS | | |
| 2005 | Target Chip Ganassi Racing | Panoz GF09C | Toyota Indy V8 | F | | | HMS | PHX | STP | MOT | INDY | TXS | RIR | KAN | NSH | MIL | MCH | KTY | PPIR | SNM | CHI | WGL | FON |
| 2005 | Target Chip Ganassi Racing | Panoz GF09C | Toyota Indy V8 | F | (New Zealand) Scott Dixon | 9 | 16 | 12 | 6 | | 24 | 11 | 22 | 18 | 6 | 13 | 19 | 23 | 16 | 7 | 19 | 1* | 10 |
| 2005 | Target Chip Ganassi Racing | Panoz GF09C | Toyota Indy V8 | F | (United Kingdom) Darren Manning | 10 | 6 | 8 | 9 | 8 | 29 | 17 | 15 | 7 | 20 | 20 | | | | | | | |
| 2005 | Target Chip Ganassi Racing | Panoz GF09C | Toyota Indy V8 | F | (United States) Jaques Lazier | 10 | | | | | | | | | | | 17 | 15 | DNS | | 16 | | 17 |
| 2005 | Target Chip Ganassi Racing | Panoz GF09C | Toyota Indy V8 | F | (Italy) Giorgio Pantano | 10 | | | | | | | | | | | | | | 14 | | 4 | |
| 2005 | Target Chip Ganassi Racing | Panoz GF09C | Toyota Indy V8 | F | (Australia) Ryan Briscoe | 33 | 20 | 19 | 14* | 12 | 10 | 12 | 21 | 21 | 8 | DNS | 10 | 13 | 20 | **19** | 22 | | |
| 2006 | Target Chip Ganassi Racing | Panoz GF09C | Honda HI6R V8 | F | | | HMS | STP | MOT | INDY | WGL | TXS | RIR | KAN | NSH | MIL | MCH | KTY | SNM | CHI | | | |
| 2006 | Target Chip Ganassi Racing | Panoz GF09C | Honda HI6R V8 | F | (New Zealand) Scott Dixon | 9 | | 2 | | | 1 | | | | | | | | **4*** | | | | |
| 2006 | Target Chip Ganassi Racing | Panoz GF09C | Honda HI6R V8 | F | (United Kingdom) Dan Wheldon | 10 | | 16 | | | 15* | | | | | | | | 6 | | | | |
