= 2003 Chevy 500 =

Motor race held in Fort Worth, Texas

(United States) 2003 Chevy 500
Race details
- Race 16 of 16 in the 2003 IndyCar Series season
- Layout of Texas Motor Speedway
- Date: October 12, 2003
- Official name: Chevy 500
- Location: Texas Motor Speedway; Fort Worth, Texas, United States
- Course: Permanent racing facility 1.500 mi / 2.414 km
- Distance: 195 laps 292.500 mi / 470.733 km
- Scheduled Distance: 200 laps 300.000 mi / 482.803 km

Pole position
- Driver: (Brazil) Gil de Ferran (Team Penske)
- Time: 23.5031

Fastest lap
- Driver: (Brazil) Tony Kanaan (Andretti Green Racing)
- Time: 23.4413 (on lap 185 of 195)

Podium
- First: (Brazil) Gil de Ferran (Team Penske)
- Second: (New Zealand) Scott Dixon (Chip Ganassi Racing)
- Third: (United Kingdom) Dan Wheldon (Andretti Green Racing)

The 2003 Chevy 500 was an IRL IndyCar Series motor race held on October 12, 2003, at Texas Motor Speedway in Fort Worth, Texas before 102,000 spectators. It was the 16th and final round of the 2003 IRL IndyCar Series and the sixth running of the event. The race was won by Team Penske driver Gil de Ferran, the last of his 12 wins in his final American open-wheel car racing start. Scott Dixon came in second for Chip Ganassi Racing, and Andretti Green Racing's Dan Wheldon took third place.

Five drivers – Dixon, Hélio Castroneves, Tony Kanaan, Sam Hornish Jr., and de Ferran – entered the race with a mathematical chance to win the Drivers' Championship. De Ferran earned the pole position by recording the fastest lap of qualifying. He emerged as an early contender for the race win, leading 32 of the first 100 laps and consistently racing within the top-five positions. However, after making a pit stop under a caution period, he was mired in the rear of the field and nearly involved in a two-car crash on the 99th lap. His team resorted to a conservative fuel strategy, which eventually succeeded when he assumed the lead for good on lap 160.

The race was brought to an end after 195 of the scheduled 200 laps were completed because of a violent crash on lap 188 in which Kenny Bräck slammed the back stretch catch fence at 214G, the highest G-force that a human has ever endured and lived. Bräck suffered severe injuries and only raced once in the IndyCar Series after the crash. As a result of Bräck's accident and several similar incidents throughout the 2003 season, the series' engines were downsized to reduce speeds.

The final result gave Dixon his first Drivers' Championship, as Castroneves, Kanaan, and Hornish were all sidelined by issues late in the race and de Ferran was unable to surmount Dixon's championship lead. Toyota also won the Manufacturers' Championship over Honda and Chevrolet. During the race, there were six cautions and 11 lead changes among six drivers.

== Background ==
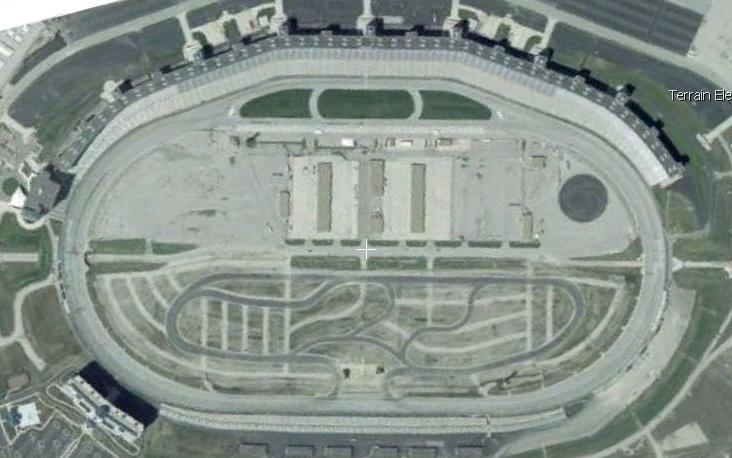
Texas Motor Speedway (pictured in 2005), where the race was held.

The 2003 Chevy 500 was first confirmed to be included on the IRL IndyCar Series' 2003 schedule in July 2002. The sixth annual running of the event, it was held at Texas Motor Speedway (TMS), a four-turn, 1.5 mi (2.4 km) asphalt oval track with 24-degree banking in the turns, in Fort Worth, Texas, on Sunday, October 12, 2003, as the 16th and final round of the 2003 season. Of the 22 cars entered for the race, which all used Dallara and G-Force chassis and Firestone tires, the lone driver change was for Dan Wheldon, who switched from the No. 26 car to the No. 7 car to promote the Texas-based store chain, 7-Eleven, on two cars in the weekend with Andretti Green Racing teammate Tony Kanaan. The car had not been used since the Indianapolis 500.

Heading into the race, Scott Dixon and Hélio Castroneves were tied for the Drivers' Championship lead with 467 points each. Third-place Kanaan trailed the two by seven points, while Sam Hornish Jr. was fourth with 448 points and Gil de Ferran was fifth with 437. All five drivers were mathematically eligible to win the championship, as the race awarded a maximum of 52 points. As for the Manufacturers' Championship, Toyota led on 135 points, 36 more than Honda and 39 more than Chevrolet.

The five-driver battle for the title was the closest in IndyCar Series history up to that point, and was touted by the Indy Racing League (IRL; the IndyCar Series' sanctioning body) as the closest in the near century-long history of American open-wheel car racing. Several past champions of the sport, including Mario Andretti, Rick Mears, and Bobby Unser, spoke positively of the series' competitiveness and expressed their excitement for the race. Veteran journalist Robin Miller wrote for ESPN that TMS was the "calling card of the Indy Racing League" because of its "breathtaking" racing style. This was also the last race for de Ferran, two-time Championship Auto Racing Teams (CART) champion and 2003 Indianapolis 500 winner, who announced his retirement from the sport on August 25. He described himself as the "long shot" for the title, but hoped to win it to bring an "ideal" end to his career. As a tribute to de Ferran, Brazilian airline manufacturer Embraer provided him and his family with a plane to travel back to his home in Fort Lauderdale, Florida after the race.

In his final race with Panther Racing, Hornish wished that his points deficit to the leaders was not as large because he was forced to win and lead the most laps in order to win the title. He looked to become the second driver to win three consecutive American open-wheel championships, a feat only accomplished by Ted Horn in 1946–1948. Kanaan, who earned one victory to that point in his first IndyCar Series season, aimed to win the race by driving patiently until the end. Castroneves expected the race to be a "war" and contrasted it to the 2002 Chevy 500, in which only he and Hornish fought for the title. He also revealed that he hung a horseshoe above his garage stall for good luck. Dixon was confident in his team's ability to pull through with a win to ensure the championship, just as he had done in the 2000 Indy Lights season. To prepare for the race, Kanaan and Castroneves tested at TMS on September 25–26, as did Hornish on September 30.

== Practice and qualifying ==
Four practice sessions preceded the race on Sunday, two on Friday and two on Saturday. For the first three sessions, which all lasted 60 minutes, the drivers were split into two groups, with each running for half the sessions. The last session was open to all drivers and was only held for 30 minutes. Dixon led the first practice session with a lap time of 23.4233 seconds, besting Tora Takagi, Kanaan, Hornish, and de Ferran. In the second practice session, Dixon continued displaying fast pace with a 23.4391-second lap, with Vítor Meira in second, Kanaan in third, Castroneves in fourth, and Bryan Herta in fifth. Wheldon reportedly had trouble locating his pit stall and was reminded by his team that he was in the No. 7 car.

On Friday evening, a 65-minute qualifying session determined the starting grid for the race. Each driver was required to complete two timed laps in their qualifying attempt, with the quickest of the two determining their position. De Ferran earned his fifth IndyCar Series pole position (and his 20th in American open-wheel car racing, counting his 15 poles in CART) with a time of 23.5031 seconds; his last pole was in the 2002 Gateway Indy 250. Dixon started second with a lap that was 0.0009 seconds slower, the second-closest deficit between the top-two qualifiers in series history. Tomas Scheckter took third, Felipe Giaffone fourth, and Castroneves fifth, with Meira, Kenny Bräck, Herta, Kanaan, and Robbie Buhl assuming the remaining top-ten positions. Positions 11th through 18th were taken by Takagi, Hornish, Greg Ray, Alex Barron, Roger Yasukawa, Wheldon, Al Unser Jr., and Richie Hearn. A. J. Foyt IV was intended to take to the track second in line, but was ultimately the last driver to make a qualifying attempt because of an issue with his car's fuel system; he qualified 19th, ahead of Scott Sharp in 20th, Sarah Fisher in 21st, and Ed Carpenter in 22nd.

The third practice session on Saturday morning was led by Yasukawa with a time of 23.3944 seconds, with Ray, Giaffone, Meira, and Bräck rounding out the top-five. Hornish did not participate in the session because his team installed a new engine and did not want to waste mileage on it yet. He went on to lap the fastest time of the final practice session in the afternoon at 23.3563 seconds, outpacing the times of Castroneves, Scheckter, Bräck, and Dixon. Barron and Buhl made slight contact during the session, but neither sustained any damage.

=== Qualifying classification ===
Final qualifying results
Pos.	No.	Driver	Team	Time	Speed	Grid
1	6	(Brazil) Gil de Ferran	Team Penske	23.5031	222.864	1
2	9	(New Zealand) Scott Dixon	Chip Ganassi Racing	23.5040	222.856	2
3	10	(South Africa) Tomas Scheckter	Chip Ganassi Racing	23.5988	221.960	3
4	21	(Brazil) Felipe Giaffone	Mo Nunn Racing	23.5995	221.954	4
5	3	(Brazil) Hélio Castroneves	Team Penske	23.6073	221.881	5
6	2	(Brazil) Vítor Meira	Team Menard	23.6095	221.860	6
7	15	(Sweden) Kenny Bräck	Team Rahal	23.6492	221.487	7
8	27	(United States) Bryan Herta	Andretti Green Racing	23.6928	221.080	8
9	11	(Brazil) Tony Kanaan	Andretti Green Racing	23.7186	220.839	9
10	24	(United States) Robbie Buhl	Dreyer & Reinbold Racing	23.7244	220.785	10
11	12	(Japan) Tora Takagi	Mo Nunn Racing	23.7564	220.488	11
12	4	(United States) Sam Hornish Jr.	Panther Racing	23.7612	220.443	12
13	13	(United States) Greg Ray	Access Motorsports	23.8132	219.962	13
14	52	(United States) Alex Barron	Cheever Racing	23.8441	219.677	14
15	55	(Japan) Roger Yasukawa	Fernández Racing	23.8545	219.581	15
16	7	(United Kingdom) Dan Wheldon	Andretti Green Racing	23.8671	219.465	16
17	31	(United States) Al Unser Jr.	Kelley Racing	23.9697	218.526	17
18	91	(United States) Richie Hearn	Hemelgarn Racing	23.9762	218.467	18
19	14	(United States) A. J. Foyt IV	A. J. Foyt Racing	24.0782	217.541	19
20	8	(United States) Scott Sharp	Kelley Racing	24.0796	217.529	20
21	23	(United States) Sarah Fisher	Dreyer & Reinbold Racing	24.1475	216.917	21
22	18	(United States) Ed Carpenter	PDM Racing	24.4969	213.823	22

== Race ==
The 200-lap, 300 mi (480 km) race began at 2:45 p.m. Central Daylight Time (UTC−05:00) and was attended by 102,000 spectators. The weather conditions were sunny, with air temperatures recorded from 72 to 75 °F (22 to 24 °C) and track temperatures from 90 to 104 °F (32 to 40 °C). Chevrolet general manager Brent Dewar commanded the drivers to start their engines, and three-time Indianapolis 500 winner Johnny Rutherford drove the pace car. When the race began, de Ferran used his pole position to his advantage and pulled ahead of Dixon to lead the first lap. Dixon drove to his outside and crossed the start/finish line 0.0056 seconds ahead of de Ferran on the second lap. Kanaan moved up to fourth place by the third lap, while Scheckter dropped from fourth to eighth a lap later after nearly losing control of his car in the second turn. De Ferran, meanwhile, reclaimed the lead on lap five. Hornish emerged into the top-ten on lap seven and moved to fifth place ten laps later, behind the other four championship contenders. He then steered to the right of Castroneves in turn four and passed him for fourth place on the 20th lap.

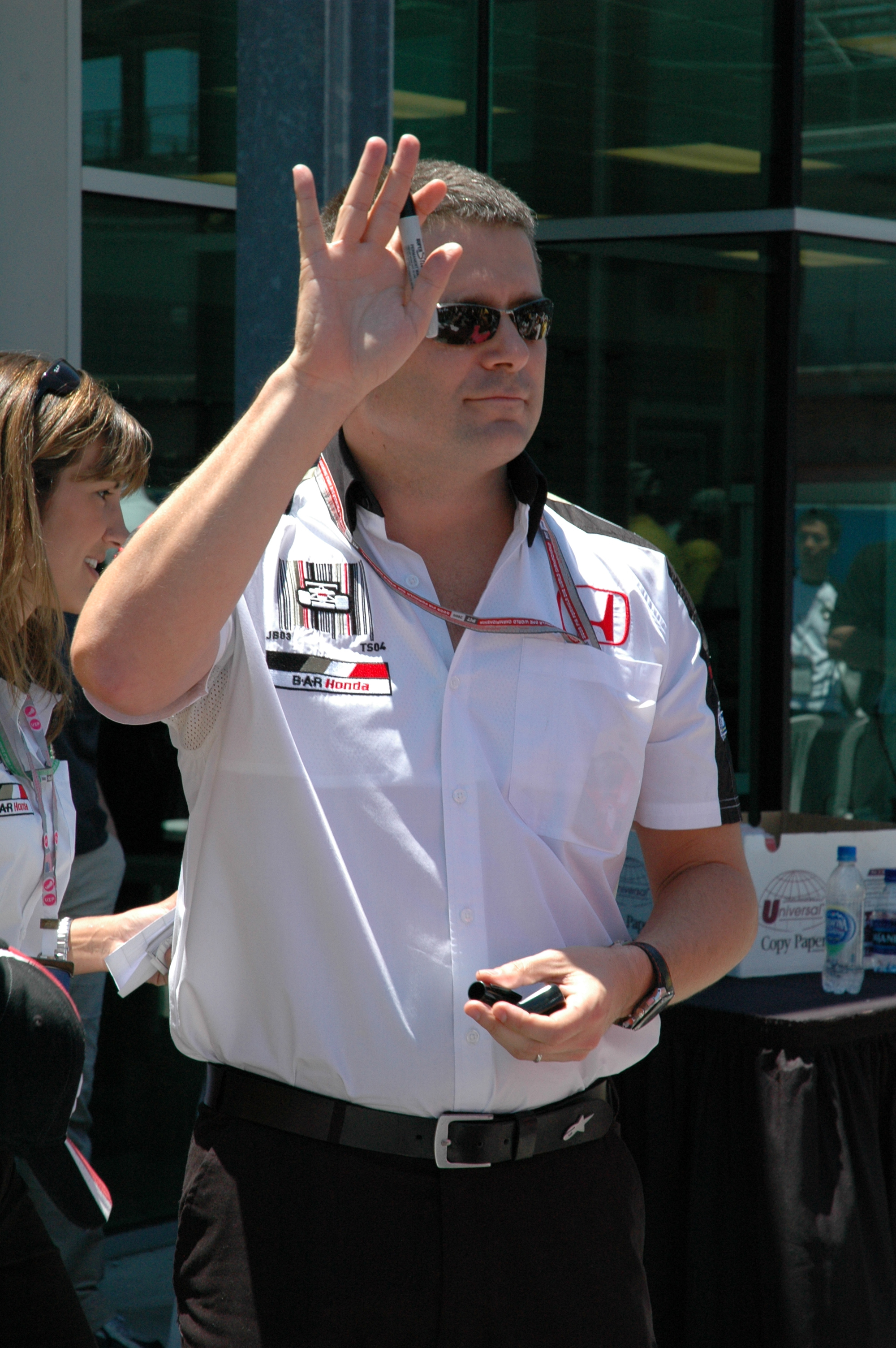
Gil de Ferran (pictured in 2005) earned the pole position and the race win in his final IndyCar Series start.

The caution flag was issued for the first time on lap 31 when debris was spotted by track officials on the back stretch. During the caution period, all of the leaders made pit stops for fuel, new tires, and adjustments to their cars on lap 33. Meira's right-rear tire detached from his car as he exited pit road, forcing him to come back in the next lap. Having taken the lead from de Ferran in the pit stop sequence, Kanaan led the field back up to speed on lap 37. Scheckter was tenth during the restart, but by the 50th lap, he had improved to fifth place. The next lap, Carpenter slowed to a stop on the apron in turn one with an alternator issue; the second caution was flown on lap 52 to allow officials to tow his car into pit road. Some of the leaders made stops under caution, but Kanaan stayed on-track and led at the lap-57 restart, ahead of Dixon, Wheldon, Giaffone, and Yasukawa. Hornish, who restarted outside of the top-ten, made his way up to fifth place by the 65th lap and fourth place five laps later. Castroneves also moved into the sixth position on lap 73. After losing 17 laps to the leaders while his electronic control unit was being replaced, Foyt IV continued struggling with engine issues, forcing him to retire from the race on the 81st lap.

Two laps later, the caution was flown for the third time when Carpenter, who still had a faulty alternator, stalled in turn one. As all of the leaders made their stops, Dixon edited pit road ahead of Kanaan to take the lead. Meira returned to pit road to his tighten his right-rear tire. Green-flag racing resumed on the 89th lap, with Dixon, Kanaan, Castroneves, Hornish, and Scheckter in the top-five. Kanaan pulled to Dixon's outside, but Dixon successfully defended his lead by 0.0128 seconds. On lap 93, Wheldon overtook Scheckter for the fifth position, while Castroneves battled with Kanaan for second place. Six laps later, Giaffone tried to pass Sharp on the outside line at the exit of turn four, but was squeezed into the wall. He slid down the front stretch and towards the path of Barron, who spun into the wall while trying to maneuver around him. De Ferran drove into the infield grass and successfully avoided the crash, which prompted the race's fourth caution, but came into pit road to inspect any possible damage, which forced his team to adopt a conservative fuel strategy to win the race. Only five other drivers opted to make a pit stop, including Bräck, who briefly stalled as he exited his pit stall.

Dixon led at the lap-107 restart. On the 111th lap, Yasukawa's pace began to slow as he dealt with a gearbox issue, forcing him to stay in fourth gear. Castroneves moved up to second place on lap 117, but dropped to the fifth position five laps later. On lap 126, Kanaan fell to fourth place behind Scheckter in second and Hornish in third. The next lap, Hornish overtook Scheckter on the inside line in turn four. Buhl then passed Castroneves for fourth on the 129th lap. Two laps later, Hornish drove to Dixon's outside and raced side-by-side with him. He led lap 138, but was not fully ahead of Dixon until lap 141, when he pulled ahead in the third and fourth turns. Eight laps later, Buhl began the first cycle of green-flag pit stops when he came into pit road for fuel and tires. On lap 152, Hornish made his stop and ceded the lead to Kanaan, who then pitted two laps later. Wheldon and Sharp led one and five laps, respectively, before they also made their stops.

By virtue of his pit strategy, de Ferran assumed the lead on lap 160. Four laps later, Hornish's championship hopes were jeopardized when an issue with his rev limiter caused him to dramatically slow his pace. De Ferran made his final stop on the 168th lap, but maintained the lead because he had such a large advantage over second-place Castroneves. On lap 174, Hearn contacted the turn-three wall, which brought out the fifth caution. Hornish came into pit road on lap 176 and retired from the race after his engine leaked oil on the track. The green flag was issued again three laps later. As Castroneves and Kanaan battled for second place, the two collided entering the third turn on lap 180. Kanaan's left-rear tire was punctured and he made a stop on the 181st lap, followed by Castroneves two laps later, which ended their efforts for the title. Kanaan recorded the fastest lap time of the race on the 185th lap (23.4413 seconds), shortly after rejoining the race.

=== Kenny Bräck crash and race end ===
Kenny Bräck crashing into the catch fence.

On lap 188, Bräck steered to the right in an attempt to pass Scheckter for third place on the back stretch. The left-side tires of Bräck's car made contact with the right-side tires of Scheckter's car, sending both spinning up the track. At a speed of 220 mph (350 km/h), Bräck's car flew 12 ft (3.7 m) in the air before its nose pierced a steel post in the 23 ft (7.0 m)-high catch fence, placed atop the 39 in (0.99 m)-high wall. The car completely disintegrated upon impact, apart from the drivers' compartment, and violently pinwheeled across the track until it came to a stop upside-down at the apron of turn three. Scheckter climbed from his car without assistance, while Bräck was extracted from his car by track officials and treated at the infield care center, where he was joking with his wife, Anita, and the manager of Team Rahal, according to a team spokesman. He was then airlifted to the Parkland Memorial Hospital, where he was listed in "serious but stable condition".

The crash prompted the sixth caution of the race. The catch fence had been severely damaged by Bräck's car; one of his rear tires was lodged into a support cable and TMS executive vice president Eddie Gossage predicted that 100 ft (30 m) of the fencing would have to be replaced. Some of the concrete within the outside wall also sustained damage. Because of the wreckage, IRL officials announced on the 193rd lap that the race would finish after 195 laps were completed. De Ferran paced under caution to earn his third win of the season, his fifth IndyCar Series win, and his 12th and final victory in American open-wheel car racing, having won seven CART races. He became the first driver since Keith Kauffman in the 1982 Nazareth 100 to win in his final American open-wheel car start. Dixon's second-place finish was enough for him to clinch his first IndyCar Series Drivers' Championship. Wheldon came in third, the best finish of his career at that point, to secure the Rookie of the Year title. Meira, Herta, Sharp, Takagi, Ray, Unser, Yasukawa, and Buhl were the last drivers to finish on the lead lap; Fisher and Castroneves finished a lap behind the leaders, and Kanaan was two laps in arrears. Six drivers exchanged the lead 11 times during the course of the race. Race winner de Ferran led 68 laps, the most of any driver.

=== Post-race ===
The mood at the track was described as subdued after the lap-188 crash. In a victory lane interview, de Ferran expressed gratitude that he was able to win in his last start, but was disturbed by the crash, saying, "To be honest, most of my concern was with Kenny at that point. The catch fencing was gone and the wheel hanging. It was a horrific scene. My heart is being pulled in many different directions. I won my last race, but there's a big crash. I apologize for being a little bit somber. I've known Kenny for many years. My thoughts and prayers are with him." He earned US$126,400 for his victory. Dixon, the 2003 champion, admitted he had "mixed emotions" when his team, Chip Ganassi Racing, switched to the IndyCar Series after he competed in CART the past two years, but stated: "I always had fun on ovals and I like the technical tracks like Homestead, Phoenix, and Nazareth. Yeah, it's all oval tracks but there are some very accomplished road racers in this series and it was a good battle all year." His team owner, Chip Ganassi, lauded him for being "all business" and likened him to Juan Pablo Montoya, Alex Zanardi, and Jimmy Vasser, all of whom won titles for Ganassi's team in CART.

A black box within Bräck's car revealed that his impact into the catch fence measured a force of 214G, which is officially recognized by the Guinness World Records as the highest G-force that a human has ever endured involuntarily and survived. He had broken his sternum, two ribs, L3 vertebra, right femur, and both ankles. Bräck underwent two surgeries on Sunday and Monday night to repair his ankles and femur and fuse his L3 vertebra into his L2 and L4 vertebrae. Following these surgeries, his condition was upgraded to "satisfactory" on October 19, and he was transferred to the Indiana University Health Methodist Hospital via helicopter two days later, where he began his six-month rehabilitation process with IRL medical services director Dr. Henry Bock. Bräck has since said that he has no memories of the crash, but attributed his survival of the crash to his faith in God. While Bräck recovered, his seat at Team Rahal was taken by Buddy Rice beginning in the 2004 season. Bräck has only driven an Indy car twice since his near-fatal crash, first in a testing session at Richmond International Raceway in June 2004 and second in the 2005 Indianapolis 500 while substituting for an injured Rice. However, on both occasions, he complained of low stamina and felt "completely finished" upon stepping out of his car. Three months after the Indianapolis 500, Bräck ultimately decided to retire from the IndyCar Series and became involved in the financial aspect of motor racing.

Concerns were raised over the safety of the IndyCar Series' pack racing and the newly-introduced Dallara IR-03 chassis, as Bräck was one of four drivers to have experienced an airborne crash throughout the 2003 season. (Note: Other such incidents include Mario Andretti during a testing session for the Indianapolis 500, Wheldon during the Indianapolis 500, and Castroneves during a testing session at Richmond International Raceway.) Robin Miller wrote: "Ovals remain the best show for television, yet they are also the worst place to have an accident. The IRL has dodged a lot of big bullets since '96 (the year that the series debuted) but it needs to seriously address its aero package, speeds, cars and propensity for carnage on its action tracks. Maybe (Charlotte Motor Speedway president) Humpy Wheeler is right. Maybe it's time for fenders." He also noted that since 1996, 76 drivers had been injured in the IndyCar Series, whereas only 32 drivers suffered injuries in the rivaling CART series. Scheckter shared a similar sentiment and said that big accidents in the series had occurred "a little too many times." The concerns were heightened when Tony Renna was killed in a testing crash at Indianapolis Motor Speedway on October 22 after his car got airborne and slammed the catch fence in turn three. The IRL insisted that the increase in airborne crashes was not caused by the new chassis, but they made an attempt to reduce speeds in the IndyCar Series by downsizing the engines from 3.5 L (0.92 U.S. gal) to 3 L (0.79 U.S. gal) for 2004.

The final result gave Dixon the Drivers' Championship with 507 points, 18 more than de Ferran, who advanced to second in the standings. Castroneves amassed 484 points for third place, followed by Kanaan with 476 and Hornish with 461. Toyota earned the Manufacturers' Championship having taken 145 points. Honda had 106 points and finished second in the standings, while Chevrolet placed third with 101 points.

=== Race classification ===
Final race results
Pos.	No.	Driver	Team	Laps	Time/Retired	Grid	Laps led	Points
1	6	(Brazil) Gil de Ferran	Team Penske	195	1:48:56.2674	1	68	52^{1}
2	9	(New Zealand) Scott Dixon	Chip Ganassi Racing	195	+0.2081	2	57	40
3	7	(United Kingdom) Dan Wheldon	Andretti Green Racing	195	+1.0931	16	1	35
4	2	(Brazil) Vítor Meira	Team Menard	195	+1.7778	6	0	32
5	27	(United States) Bryan Herta	Andretti Green Racing	195	+3.5941	8	0	30
6	8	(United States) Scott Sharp	Kelley Racing	195	+5.0714	20	5	28
7	12	(Japan) Tora Takagi	Mo Nunn Racing	195	+5.4539	11	0	26
8	13	(United States) Greg Ray	Access Motorsports	195	+6.7528	13	0	24
9	31	(United States) Al Unser Jr.	Kelley Racing	195	+9.1089	17	0	22
10	55	(Japan) Roger Yasukawa	Fernández Racing	195	+9.7975	15	0	20
11	24	(United States) Robbie Buhl	Dreyer & Reinbold Racing	195	+17.4239	10	0	19
12	23	(United States) Sarah Fisher	Dreyer & Reinbold Racing	194	+1 lap	21	0	18
13	3	(Brazil) Hélio Castroneves	Team Penske	194	+1 lap	5	0	17
14	11	(Brazil) Tony Kanaan	Andretti Green Racing	193	+2 laps	9	52	16
15	10	(South Africa) Tomas Scheckter	Chip Ganassi Racing	187	Accident	3	0	15
16	15	(Sweden) Kenny Bräck	Team Rahal	187	Accident	7	0	14
17	4	(United States) Sam Hornish Jr.	Panther Racing	176	Oil spray	12	12	13
18	91	(United States) Richie Hearn	Hemelgarn Racing	172	Accident	18	0	12
19	21	(Brazil) Felipe Giaffone	Mo Nunn Racing	98	Accident	4	0	11
20	52	(United States) Alex Barron	Cheever Racing	98	Accident	14	0	10
21	18	(United States) Ed Carpenter	PDM Racing	69	Alternator	22	0	9
22	14	(United States) A. J. Foyt IV	A. J. Foyt Racing	62	Engine	19	0	8

Notes

- ^1 – Includes two bonus points for leading the most laps.

== Final championship standings ==
Drivers' Championship standings
+/-	Pos.	Driver	Points
	1	(New Zealand) **Scott Dixon**	507
**3**	2	(Brazil) Gil de Ferran	489 (–18)
**1**	3	(Brazil) Hélio Castroneves	484 (–23)
**1**	4	(Brazil) Tony Kanaan	476 (–31)
**1**	5	(United States) Sam Hornish Jr.	461 (–46)

Manufacturers' Championship standings
+/-	Pos.	Manufacturer	Points
	1	(Japan) **Toyota**	145
	2	(Japan) Honda	106 (–39)
	3	(United States) Chevrolet	101 (–44)

- Note: Only the top five positions are included for the Drivers' Championship standings.
- **Bold text** indicates the National Champions.

== Notes and references ==
=== References ===
Previous race: 2003 Toyota Indy 400	IndyCar Series; 2003 season	Next race: 2004 Toyota Indy 300
Previous race: 2002 Chevy 500	Chevy 500	Next race: 2004 Chevy 500
