= Mark Taylor (racing driver) =

British racing driver

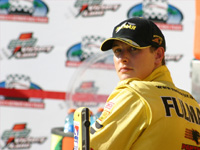
- Taylor in 2003
- Nationality: Great Britain
- Born: 16 December 1977 (age 48) Wimbledon, London, England
- Retired: 2004

IRL IndyCar Series
- Years active: 2004
- Teams: Panther Racing; Access Motorsports
- Starts: 15
- Wins: 0
- Poles: 0
- Best finish: 17th in 2004

Infiniti Pro Series
- Years active: 2003
- Teams: Panther Racing
- Starts: 11
- Wins: 7
- Poles: 3
- Best finish: 1st in 2003

Previous series
- 2001–2002 1999–2000 1999–2000: British Formula Three Championship; European Formula Ford Championship; Formula Ford Great Britain

Championship titles
- 2003 2000 1997: Infiniti Pro Series; European Formula Ford Championship; Formula Ford UK Winter Series

Mark Taylor (born 16 December 1977) is a British former racing driver who drove in the Indy Racing League IndyCar Series. He drove in the 2004 season for two different teams.

Taylor began racing in Formula Ford in his native Britain, winning the 1997 Winter Championship. He finished eighth in the main championship in 1999 while also finishing fourth in European Formula Ford that year. He won the 2000 European championship and was also runner-up in the British championship.

Taylor moved to the British Formula Three Championship in 2001 and finished ninth. The following year, he captured his first win and finished seventh in points.

In 2003, Taylor moved to the American Infiniti Pro Series. He dominated the field, winning seven of the twelve races in the season driving the No. 4 car for the Fulmar Panther team. He graduated to the IndyCar Series driving the No. 2 for Team Menard in 2004. However, while showing good speed, particularly in qualifying, he struggled to adapt to the top series. He was involved in accidents in five of his six starts (including the Indy 500) before he was dropped in favor of Townsend Bell.

After missing only one race, Taylor was drafted by Greg Ray's Access Motorsports to drive the No. 13 car. He was unable to repeat his qualifying performances from earlier in the season but showed maturity in the car to finish seven of his nine races for Access with a best finish of seventh place.

== Racing record ==
=== Complete American Open Wheel Racing results ===
(key)

==== Infiniti Pro Series ====
Year	Team	1	2	3	4	5	6	7	8	9	10	11	12	Rank	Points
2003	Panther Racing	HMS; 1	PHX; 1	INDY; 3	PPIR; 5	KAN; 1	NSH; 1	MIS; 1	STL; 9	KTY; DNS	CHI; 1	FON; 1	TXS; 14	1st	482

==== IRL IndyCar Series ====
Year	Team	No.	Chassis	Engine	1	2	3	4	5	6	7	8	9	10	11	12	13	14	15	16	Rank	Points	Ref
2004	Panther Racing	2	Dallara IR-04	Chevrolet Indy V8	HMS; 19	PHX; 12	MOT; 16	INDY; 30	TXS; 17	RIR; 18	KAN										17th	232	
2004	Access Motorsports	13	G-Force GF09B	Honda HI4R V8								NSH; 7	MIL; 14	MIS; 21	KTY; 19	PPIR; 14	NZR; 22	CHI; 17	FON; 10	TX2; 7	17th	232	

Sporting positions
Preceded by A. J. Foyt IV	Infiniti Pro Series Champion; 2003	Succeeded by Thiago Medeiros
