= RoadRunner Turbo Indy 300 =

IndyCar Series
- Venue: Kansas Speedway
- Corporate sponsor: Road Runner
- First race: 2001
- Last race: 2010
- Distance: 300 miles (483 km)
- Laps: 200
- Previous names: Ameristar Casino Indy 200 (2001-2002); Kansas Indy 300 (2003); Argent Mortgage Indy 300 (2004-2005); Kansas Lottery Indy 300 (2006-2007); Road Runner Turbo Indy 300 (2008-2010)
- Most wins (driver): Dan Wheldon (2); Scott Dixon (2)
- Most wins (team): Chip Ganassi Racing (4)

The RoadRunner Turbo Indy 300 was an IndyCar Series race held at Kansas Speedway in Kansas City, Kansas. The IRL Indycar Series debuted the race in 2001.

The first Indy/Championship races in the Kansas City area city took place in 1922-1924, at now-demolished Kansas City Speedway in Kansas City, Missouri. AAA held four races at the 1.25-mile (2.01 km) board track over three years. The final race was shortened from 250 miles (400 km) to 150 miles (240 km) due to damage to the track, and the series did not return.

In 2007, the race was run on April 29, 2007. The move was made at the request of spectators and participants, in hopes of cooler weather for race day. The first six years saw the race held on very hot and humid July days, making it hard for the fans and drivers. With its new date, it will mark the last IRL race before the Indianapolis 500.

The 2007 event marked one of the very few times three women have competed at the same time in a major North American race. Danica Patrick, Sarah Fisher and Milka Duno finished 7th, 12th, and 14th respectively.

The 2010 event saw it be the undercard race to the NASCAR Camping World Truck Series O'Reilly Auto Parts 250 on Sunday, instead of the other way, as the other nine race were. This decision was made in order to have the Truck race not run against the NASCAR Sprint Cup Series Crown Royal 400 at Richmond International Raceway under NASCAR's television restrictions prohibiting two national series from running at the same time.

== Past winners ==
=== AAA Championship car history ===
Season	Date	Distance	Winning driver	Car
1922	September 17	300 (483 km)	(United States) Tommy Milton	Miller
1923	July 4	250 (400 km)	(United States) Eddie Hearne	Miller
1923	October 21	250 (400 km)	(United States) Harlan Fengler	Miller
1924	July 4	150 (240 km)	(United States) Jimmy Murphy	Miller

=== Indycar Series ===
Season	Date	Driver	Team	Chassis	Engine	Race Distance		Race Time	Average Speed (mph)	Report
Season	Date	Driver	Team	Chassis	Engine	Laps	Miles (km)	Race Time	Average Speed (mph)	Report
2001	July 8	(United States) Eddie Cheever Jr.	Team Cheever	Dallara	Infiniti	200	300 (482.803)	2:02:29	148.914	Report
2002	July 7	(Brazil) Airton Daré	A. J. Foyt Enterprises	Dallara	Chevrolet	200	300 (482.803)	1:42:10	178.527	Report
2003	July 6	(United States) Bryan Herta	Andretti Green Racing	Dallara	Honda	200	300 (482.803)	1:48:51	167.57	Report
2004	July 4	(United States) Buddy Rice	Rahal Letterman Racing	Panoz G-Force	Honda	200	300 (482.803)	1:42:57	177.183	Report
2005	July 3	(Brazil) Tony Kanaan	Andretti Green Racing	Dallara	Honda	200	300 (482.803)	1:41:03	180.504	Report
2006	July 2	(United States) Sam Hornish Jr.	Team Penske	Dallara	Honda	200	300 (482.803)	1:49:00	167.331	Report
2007	April 29	(United Kingdom) Dan Wheldon	Chip Ganassi Racing	Dallara	Honda	200	300 (482.803)	1:36:56	188.169	Report
2008	April 27	(United Kingdom) Dan Wheldon	Chip Ganassi Racing	Dallara	Honda	200	300 (482.803)	1:52:45	161.774	Report
2009	April 26	(New Zealand) Scott Dixon	Chip Ganassi Racing	Dallara	Honda	200	300 (482.803)	1:43:21	176.488	Report
2010	May 1	(New Zealand) Scott Dixon	Chip Ganassi Racing	Dallara	Honda	200	300 (482.803)	1:50:43	164.741	Report

=== Indy Pro Series/Indy Lights winners ===
Season	Date	Winning driver
CART Indy Lights Series
2001	July 8	(Denmark) Kristian Kolby
IRL Indy Pro/Indy Lights Series
2002	July 7	(United States) A. J. Foyt IV
2003	July 6	(United Kingdom) Mark Taylor
2004	July 3	(Brazil) Thiago Medeiros
2005–2007: Not held
2008	April 27	(United States) J. R. Hildebrand
2009	April 26	(Colombia) Sebastián Saavedra
