= 2004 IndyCar Series =

American motor racing season

2004 IndyCar season
- IRL IndyCar Series

Season
- Races: 16
- Start date: February 29
- End date: October 17

Awards
- Drivers' champion: (Brazil) Tony Kanaan
- Manufacturers' Cup: (Japan) Honda
- Rookie of the Year: (Japan) Kosuke Matsuura
- Indianapolis 500 winner: (United States) Buddy Rice

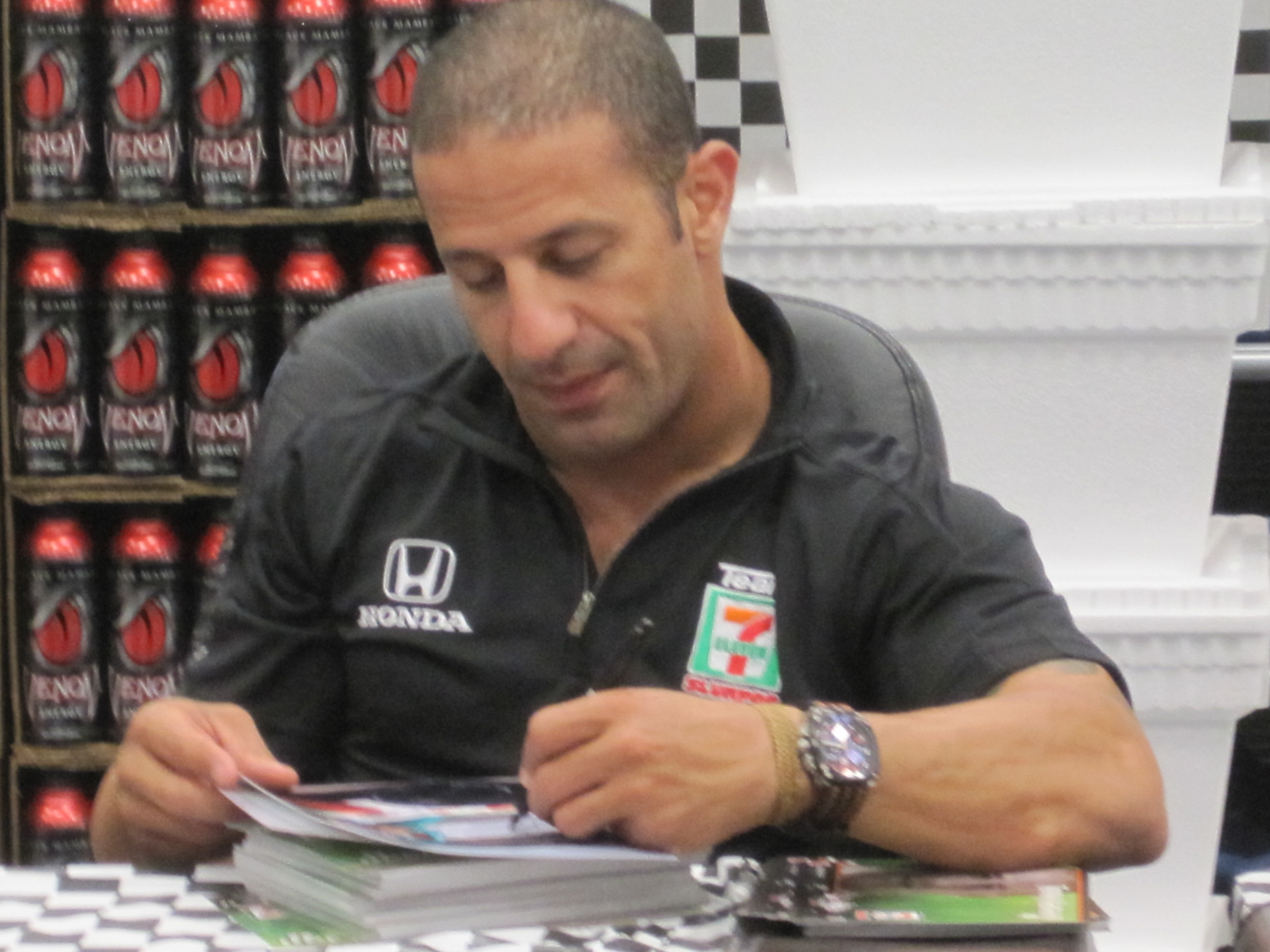
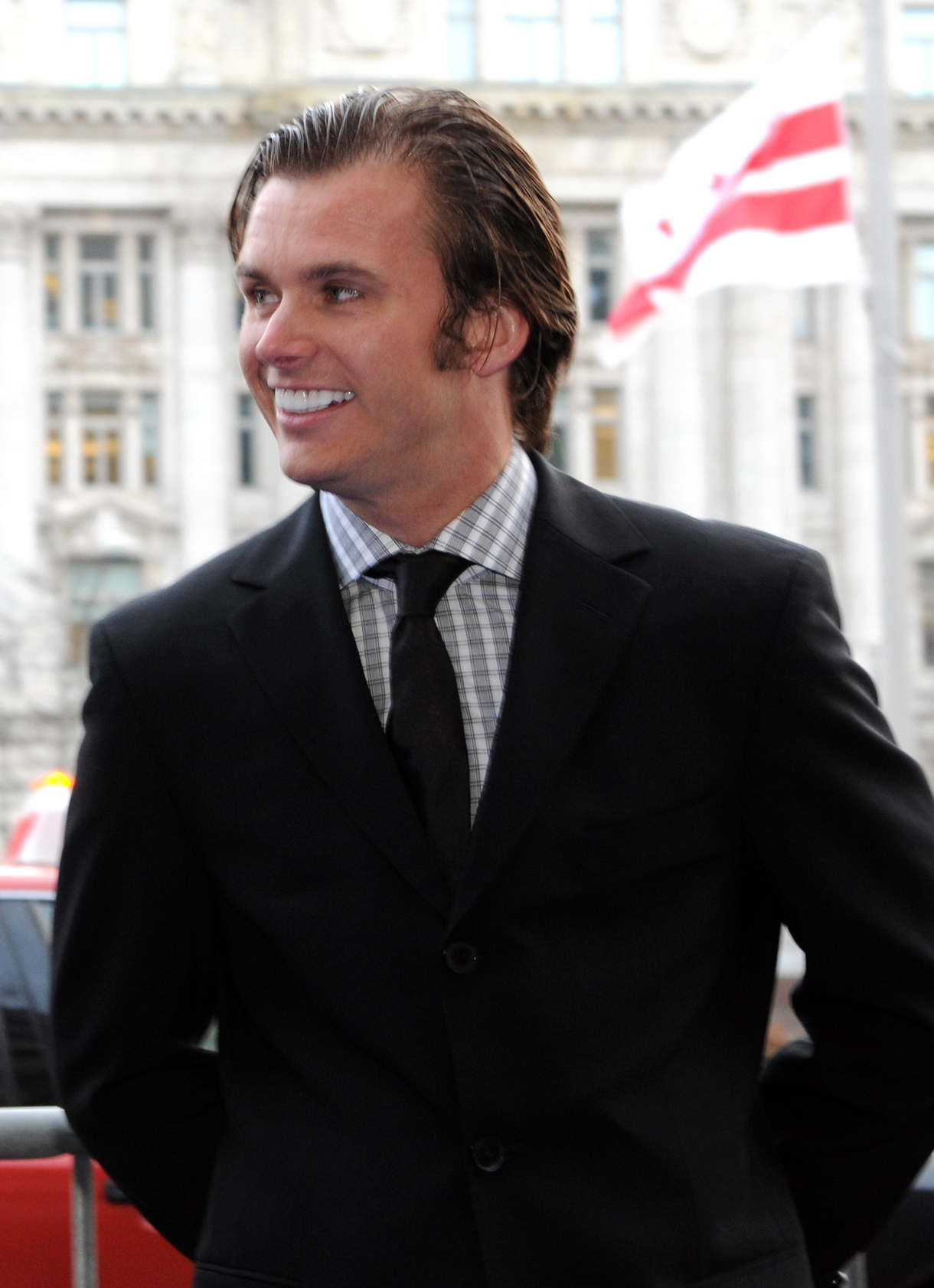
Tony Kanaan (left) won his sole Drivers' Championship after a second-place finish in the Toyota Indy 400, while his Andretti Green Racing teammate Dan Wheldon (right) finished second, 85 points behind.

The 2004 IRL IndyCar Series was the ninth season of the IRL IndyCar Series, a motor racing series recognized by its sanctioning body, the Indy Racing League (IRL), as a top-level American open-wheel car racing formula. It encompassed the 93rd national open-wheel championship season with the rival Champ Car World Series' 2004 season. Teams and drivers contested 16 races, beginning at Homestead on February 29 and ending at Texas on October 17, as they competed for the Drivers', Entrants', Engine Manufacturers', and Chassis Manufacturers' Championships. It was the last season of the series that solely featured oval tracks before road courses and street circuits were added beginning in the 2005 season.

The season was dominated by cars with engines supplied by Honda, which won fourteen consecutive races and claimed its first Engine Manufacturers' Championship at the Belterra Casino Indy 300. Andretti Green Racing was the best of the Honda teams, winning half of the season's races, as their driver Tony Kanaan maintained consistent race performances to clinch his only Drivers' Championship at the Toyota Indy 400. He completed all 3,305 laps in the season, the first driver to do so in top-level motor racing. Buddy Rice, who initially served as a temporary stand-in for the injured Kenny Bräck at Rahal Letterman Racing, enjoyed a breakthrough season, winning the 88th Indianapolis 500 and two other races to finish a career-best third in the championship. Kosuke Matsuura won the Rookie of the Year title.

Honda's advantage over fellow engine manufacturers Chevrolet and Toyota left previously successful teams such as Panther Racing and Chip Ganassi Racing winless. Scott Dixon—a driver of the latter team—entered the season as the reigning champion, but endured what he later described as a "dreadful year", failing to win any races and finishing tenth in the championship standings. It was Dixon's final season in American open-wheel car racing without a victory until 2026.

== Teams and drivers ==
The following teams and drivers competed in the 2004 IRL IndyCar Series. All teams competed with tires supplied by Firestone.

Team	Chassis	Engine	No.	Driver	Rounds
A. J. Foyt Enterprises	Dallara	Toyota	14	(United States) A. J. Foyt IV	All
A. J. Foyt Enterprises	G-Force	Toyota	41	(United States) Larry Foyt R	4
Access Motorsports	G-Force	Honda	13	(United States) Greg Ray	1–6
Access Motorsports	G-Force	Honda	13	(United Kingdom) Mark Taylor R	8–16
Andretti Green Racing	Dallara	Honda	7	(United States) Bryan Herta	All
Andretti Green Racing	Dallara	Honda	11	(Brazil) Tony Kanaan	All
Andretti Green Racing	Dallara	Honda	26	(United Kingdom) Dan Wheldon	All
Andretti Green Racing	Dallara	Honda	27	(United Kingdom) Dario Franchitti	All
Red Bull Cheever Racing	Dallara	Chevrolet	51	(United States) Alex Barron	All
Red Bull Cheever Racing	Dallara	Chevrolet	52	(United States) Ed Carpenter R	All
Target Chip Ganassi Racing	G-Force	Toyota	1	(New Zealand) Scott Dixon	All (Note: Scott Dixon entered the ninth round at Milwaukee, but missed the race after suffering injuries in a qualifying crash.)
Target Chip Ganassi Racing	G-Force	Toyota	10	(United Kingdom) Darren Manning	1–15 (Note: Darren Manning entered the fifteenth round at Fontana, but crashed in the qualifying session and suffered a concussion, forcing him out of the race.)
CURB/Agajanian/Beck Motorsports	Dallara	Chevrolet	98	(United States) P. J. Jones	4
Dreyer & Reinbold Racing	Dallara	Chevrolet	24	(United States) Robbie Buhl	1–3
Dreyer & Reinbold Racing	Dallara	Chevrolet	24	(Brazil) Felipe Giaffone	4–16
Dreyer & Reinbold/Hemelgarn Racing	Dallara	Chevrolet	91	(United States) Buddy Lazier	4
Fernández Racing	G-Force	Honda	5	(Mexico) Adrián Fernández	2–16
Super Aguri Fernández Racing	G-Force	Honda	55	(Japan) Kosuke Matsuura R	All
Kelley Racing	Dallara	Toyota	8	(United States) Scott Sharp	All
Kelley Racing	Dallara	Toyota	39	(United States) Sarah Fisher	4
Pioneer Mo Nunn Racing	Dallara	Toyota	12	(Japan) Toranosuke Takagi	All
Pioneer Mo Nunn Racing	Dallara	Toyota	21	(United States) Jeff Simmons R	4
Newman/Haas Racing	G-Force	Honda	36	(Brazil) Bruno Junqueira	4
Panther Racing	Dallara	Chevrolet	2	(United Kingdom) Mark Taylor R	1–6
Panther Racing	Dallara	Chevrolet	2	(United States) Townsend Bell	7–16
Panther Racing	Dallara	Chevrolet	4	(South Africa) Tomas Scheckter	All
Patrick Racing	Dallara	Chevrolet	20	(United States) Al Unser Jr.	4–6
Patrick Racing	Dallara	Chevrolet	20	(United States) Jeff Simmons R	7
Patrick Racing	Dallara	Chevrolet	20	(United States) Jaques Lazier	8–14
Patrick Racing	Dallara	Chevrolet	20	(Czech Republic) Tomáš Enge R	15–16
PDM Racing	Dallara	Chevrolet	18	(United States) Robby McGehee	4
Rahal Letterman Racing	G-Force	Honda	15	(United States) Buddy Rice	All
Rahal Letterman Racing	G-Force	Honda	16	(United States) Roger Yasukawa	3–4
Rahal Letterman Racing	G-Force	Honda	17	(Brazil) Vítor Meira	3–16
Robby Gordon Motorsports	Dallara	Chevrolet	70	(United States) Robby Gordon	4 (Note: Robby Gordon started the fourth round at Indianapolis, but Jaques Lazier took over his seat on lap 28 after Gordon left the track in order to compete in the Coca-Cola 600 NASCAR Nextel Cup Series race. Gordon received points for the finish.)
Robby Gordon Motorsports	Dallara	Chevrolet	70	(United States) Jaques Lazier	4
Roth Racing	Dallara	Toyota	25	(Canada) Marty Roth R	4
Sam Schmidt Motorsports	G-Force	Toyota	33	(United States) Richie Hearn	4
Marlboro Team Penske	Dallara	Toyota	3	(Brazil) Hélio Castroneves	All
Marlboro Team Penske	Dallara	Toyota	6	(United States) Sam Hornish Jr.	All

Key
Symbol	Meaning
R	Eligible for Rookie of the Year

=== Team changes ===
All teams that competed in the 2003 season returned for 2004 with the exception of Team Menard, which merged with Panther Racing. As a result, Cheever Racing lost their research and development program, but later gained a technical partnership with former Formula One engine builder Mecachrome. During the offseason, Fernández Racing and Rahal Letterman Racing switched their chassis supplier from Dallara to G-Force, while Mo Nunn Racing shifted to Dallara, having run their chassis in two races from the previous season.

=== Driver changes ===
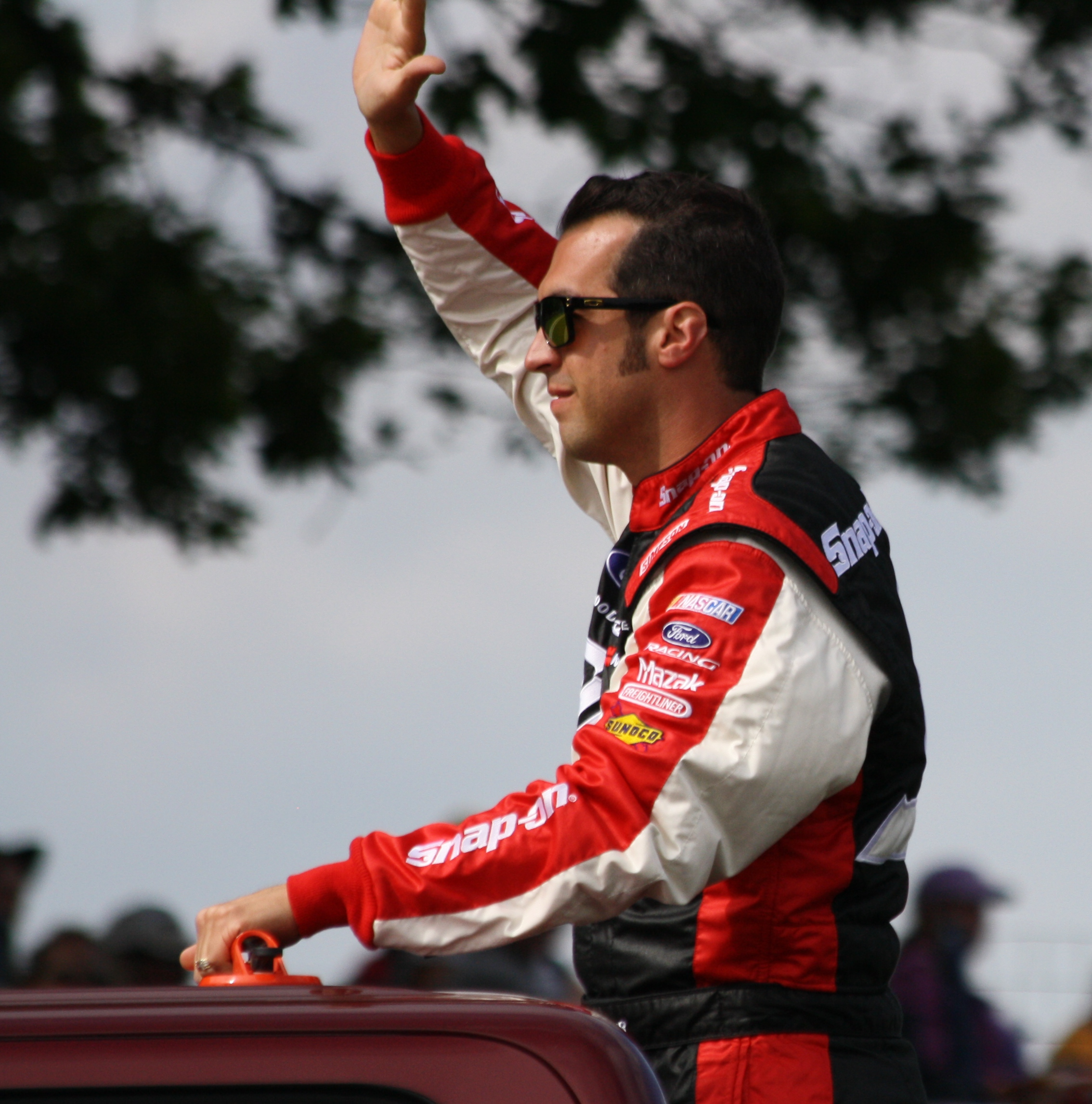
Sam Hornish Jr. (pictured in 2013) left Panther Racing, the team with which he won two Drivers' Championships, to join Team Penske for the 2004 season.

Former Champ Car World Series (CCWS) champion Gil de Ferran previously indicated that he would continue racing in 2004, but following two severe crashes and a victory in the 2003 Indianapolis 500, he decided to retire at the end of the 2003 season. His replacement was Sam Hornish Jr., a two-time IndyCar Series champion (2001, 2002) who became the series' winningest driver by earning his ninth career victory at Kentucky Speedway in 2003. Tomas Scheckter thus took the vacant seat at Panther Racing and was teamed with 2003 Infiniti Pro Series champion Mark Taylor. Tony Renna signed with Chip Ganassi Racing to replace Scheckter for 2004, but following his death in a testing crash at the Indianapolis Motor Speedway on October 21, 2003, Darren Manning drove for the team instead. Though Manning had never raced in the IndyCar Series before, his prior oval track racing experience in the CCWS made him ineligible to win the Rookie of the Year title. Manning's teammate and reigning series champion Scott Dixon changed his car number to 1.

Buddy Rice was named as the replacement for Rahal Letterman Racing driver Kenny Bräck, who suffered serious injuries in a crash during the 2003 Chevy 500. Rice was originally intended to be a temporary substitute, but he finished the season with the team as it became clear that Bräck was not yet ready to return to the IndyCar Series. Cheever Racing retained Alex Barron, who was hired by the team to replace Rice for the final three rounds of the 2003 season, while appointing rookie driver Ed Carpenter for their new second car. The team's owner, Eddie Cheever, considered fielding a third entry for him to drive in that year's Indianapolis 500, but ultimately decided against doing so to focus on running his team.

Dario Franchitti returned to the IndyCar Series after competing in only three races the previous season as he recovered from back injuries sustained in a motorcycle crash. His fill-in for the majority of the season, Bryan Herta, continued racing for Andretti Green Racing in a new fourth entry. Dan Wheldon and Tony Kanaan remained with the team as well; the latter of whom signed a four-year extension deal the previous October.

Entering their second season in the IndyCar Series, Fernández Racing replaced Roger Yasukawa with Kosuke Matsuura, who previously won races in the Formula Renault V6 Eurocup and German Formula Three series.

Dreyer & Reinbold Racing, Mo Nunn Racing, and Kelley Racing each trimmed their IndyCar Series programs to one full-time car due to a loss of sponsorship, leaving their respective former drivers—Sarah Fisher, Felipe Giaffone, and Al Unser Jr.—without a ride for the 2004 season.

==== Mid-season changes ====
"I can’t save Champ Car on my own… and I had to look at the facts that were presented by OWRS and decide if we wanted to take the risk and move forward based on empty promises and a “trust us” mentality. Long Beach was not close to what I expected, and we made our decision then, after talking with our sponsors, to go to the IRL."

— Adrián Fernández explaining his decision to fully commit to the IRL IndyCar Series.

Two days after appearing at the CCWS media tour in Long Beach, Adrián Fernández announced his departure from the series that he had competed in since 1993 to race full-time in the IndyCar Series beginning in the second round at Phoenix International Raceway. He explained that the media tour left him with "serious doubts" over the future of the CCWS after Open Wheel Racing Series (OWRS) (Note: Open Wheel Racing Series is a group consisting of Champ Car World Series team owners Kevin Kalkhoven, Gerald Forsythe, and Paul Gentilozzi.) bought the assets of the CCWS' original sanctioning body, Championship Auto Racing Teams (CART), and relaunched the series under governing from the newly-formed Champ Car. The move prompted a largely negative reaction from his Mexican fanbase, and some internet users and press members labelled him a "traitor".

A week later, three-time CCWS champion and Rahal Letterman Racing co-owner Bobby Rahal followed suit, announcing his team's withdrawal from the series in order to expand his IndyCar Series program to two full-time cars and a third part-time entry. He did not bring along his CCWS sponsor Gigante or his driver Michel Jourdain Jr., but instead hired former Team Menard driver Vítor Meira starting from the Indy Japan 300 and Yasukawa for the Indy Japan 300 and the Indianapolis 500. Rumors soon circulated that Fernández and Rahal were each paid $6 million to switch their allegiance to the IndyCar Series by either Honda, one of the series' engine suppliers, or Indy Racing League (IRL) chief executive officer (CEO) Tony George.

Robbie Buhl, a co-owner–driver of Dreyer & Reinbold Racing, retired from motor racing after the Indy Japan 300, allowing Giaffone to take his seat from the Indianapolis 500 onwards. Pat Patrick, one of the co-founders of CART, moved his Patrick Racing team to the IndyCar Series after 24 years in the CCWS and hired Unser, a two-time Indianapolis 500 winner, for the final 12 rounds of the season. Patrick Racing's IndyCar Series program was housed at the base of CCWS team Walker Racing in Indianapolis because the team underwent a major restructuring at the end of the 2003 CCWS season.

Several teams entered one-off entries for the Indianapolis 500:

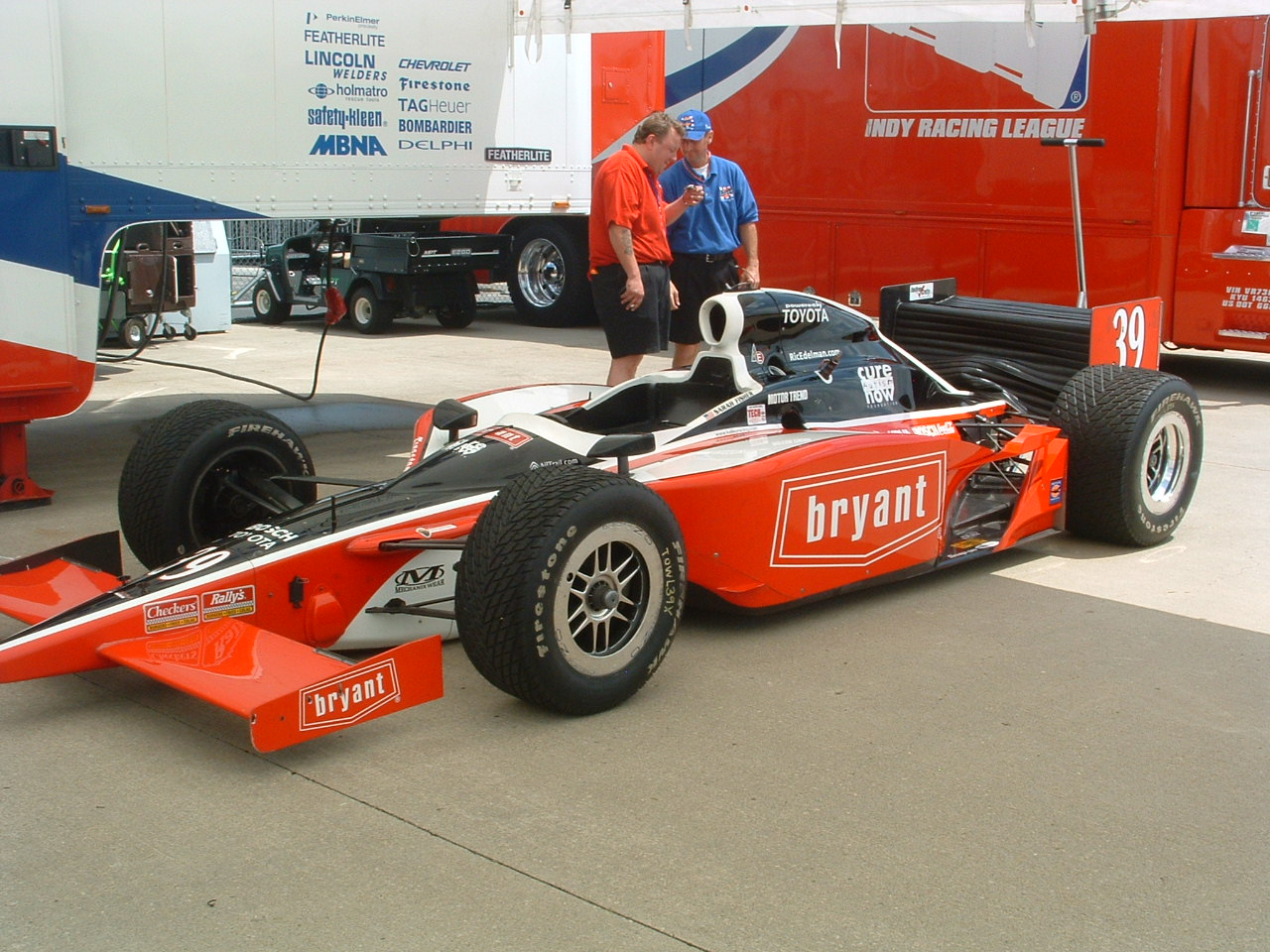
- Sarah Fisher (car pictured) was one of eight drivers who solely competed in the Indianapolis 500.
  NASCAR Nextel Cup Series driver Larry Foyt made his American open-wheel car racing debut in the race for his father A. J. Foyt's team, A. J. Foyt Racing, joining A. J. Foyt IV as the second member of the Foyt family to compete in the race in 2004.
- CURB/Agajanian/Beck Motorsports partnered with P. J. Jones, son of 1963 Indianapolis 500 winner Parnelli Jones, for his first start in the event with a paint scheme that resembled the car which the elder Jones drove to his victory, nicknamed "Old Calhoun".
- Following a split between Hemelgarn Racing and 1996 Indianapolis 500 winner Buddy Lazier towards the end of 2003, the team focused their efforts on the Menards Infiniti Pro Series, but partnered with Dreyer & Reinbold Racing to enter a car for Lazier in the Indianapolis 500.
- Air conditioning company Bryant Heating & Cooling, which sponsored Janet Guthrie in her historic debut attempt in 1976, returned to fund Fisher's effort to race in the Indianapolis 500 with Kelley Racing.
- A runner-up finish by Jeff Simmons in the Freedom 100 earned him a ride with Mo Nunn Racing for his first Indianapolis 500 start.
- After a nine-year absence, CCWS team Newman/Haas Racing returned to the Indianapolis 500 with Bruno Junqueira, who had started two previous editions of the race.
- PDM Racing initially had a multi-race agreement with 2003 ASCAR champion Ben Collins, but once the deal fell through, owner Paul Diatlovich considered shutting down his team until Robby McGehee signed on for the Indianapolis 500 with a car leased from Gordon's team.
- For the third consecutive year and the fourth overall, Robby Gordon of his self-owned Robby Gordon Motorsports attempted the Double Duty challenge of completing the Indianapolis 500 and the Coca-Cola 600 NASCAR Nextel Cup Series race on the same day. However, after the race was stopped on the 27th lap because of rain showers, Gordon exited the Indianapolis Motor Speedway with a private jet and left Jaques Lazier to complete the remainder of the Indianapolis 500; he became the first relief driver to take part in the Indianapolis 500 since Larry Cannon in 1977.
- Marty Roth, who formed Roth Racing after buying the assets of Panther Racing's Menards Infiniti Pro Series program at the end of 2003, entered the Indianapolis 500 as the race's oldest rookie since Jack Hewitt in 1998.
- As they had last year, Sam Schmidt Motorsports leased a spare chassis from Team Penske and hired veteran racer Richie Hearn, who previously ran with the team in the 2002 edition of the race.

Taylor's success in the Infiniti Pro Series did not convert to a similar performance in the IndyCar Series; after crashing out of five of the season's first six races, including the SunTrust Indy Challenge where he also collected his teammate Scheckter, he was let go from Panther Racing and replaced with Townsend Bell. Meanwhile, 1999 Pep Boys Indy Racing League champion Greg Ray was barred from competing in the Argent Mortgage 300 and the rest of the season because his team Access Motorsports was behind in their lease payments to Honda, but within two weeks, the matter had been resolved, and Ray vacated his seat to Taylor starting with the Firestone Indy 200.

Following the SunTrust Indy Challenge, Unser announced his abrupt retirement from American open-wheel car racing, bringing an end to his career that spanned twenty-three seasons, (Note: Al Unser Jr. later came out of retirement to compete in the Indianapolis 500 in 2006 and 2007.) but assured that he would still be working with Patrick Racing in some capacity. His initial replacement for the Argent Mortgage 300 was Simmons, the 16th-place finisher of the Indianapolis 500, before the team turned to more experienced drivers such as Jaques Lazier for the next seven rounds and former Formula One driver Tomáš Enge for the final two races.

Dixon was forced to miss the Menards A. J. Foyt Indy 225 because of a crash in the qualifying session that left him with injuries to his thumb and ankle. His teammate Manning suffered a back injury and concussion in a qualifying crash for the Toyota Indy 400 and resultantly sat out the final two rounds of the season.

== Schedule ==
The 2004 IRL IndyCar Series schedule was unveiled on September 17, 2003, exclusively featuring oval tracks.

Round	Date	Race	Track	Location
1	February 29	Toyota Indy 300	Homestead–Miami Speedway	Homestead, Florida
2	March 21	Copper World Indy 200	Phoenix International Raceway	Avondale, Arizona
3	April 17	Indy Japan 300	Twin Ring Motegi	Motegi, Tochigi
4	May 30	Indianapolis 500	Indianapolis Motor Speedway	Speedway, Indiana
5	June 12	Bombardier 500	Texas Motor Speedway	Fort Worth, Texas
6	June 26	SunTrust Indy Challenge	Richmond International Raceway	Richmond, Virginia
7	July 4	Argent Mortgage 300	Kansas Speedway	Kansas City, Kansas
8	July 17	Firestone Indy 200	Nashville Superspeedway	Lebanon, Tennessee
9	July 25	Menards A. J. Foyt Indy 225	Milwaukee Mile	West Allis, Wisconsin
10	August 1	Michigan Indy 400	Michigan International Speedway	Brooklyn, Michigan
11	August 15	Belterra Casino Indy 300	Kentucky Speedway	Sparta, Kentucky
12	August 22	Honda Indy 225	Pikes Peak International Raceway	Fountain, Colorado
13	August 29	Firestone Indy 225	Nazareth Speedway	Nazareth, Pennsylvania
14	September 12	Delphi Indy 300	Chicagoland Speedway	Joliet, Illinois
15	October 3	Toyota Indy 400	California Speedway	Fontana, California
16	October 17	Chevy 500	Texas Motor Speedway	Fort Worth, Texas

=== Schedule changes ===
The Milwaukee Mile, a staple in American open-wheel car racing since 1939, debuted on the IRL IndyCar Series calendar in 2004, making it the second track after California Speedway to host CCWS and IndyCar Series events in the same year during the sport's split. After three years on the series' calendar, Gateway International Raceway was dropped despite its popularity among the drivers because of its poor attendance rates. IRL officials discussed a possible return to Las Vegas Motor Speedway, which had been excluded from their schedule since 2001, but nothing materialized. Although Tony George had informed chassis and engine manufacturers to begin constructing road course equipment, no road courses were incorporated to the IndyCar Series until the 2005 season.

== Rule changes ==
=== Technical ===
Any component supplied by the IRL or an approved manufacturer was not to be altered in any way, including earpieces, attenuators, wickerbills, timing transponders, wiring harnesses, impact recorders, rev limiters, track condition radios, camera mounts and covers, and head surrounds and fasteners.

==== Aerodynamics ====
The IRL mandated several regulation changes to reduce the cars' speeds. In preparation for the road course events in 2005, each car was required to run with sidepod radiators, which increased drag on oval tracks. For races on tracks between 1 mile (1.6 kilometres) and 2 miles (3.2 kilometres) in length, the IRL supplied all teams with identical vertical wickers, which were to be fitted on the rearmost outer edge of the rear wing.

==== Engines ====
The 2003 season saw record speeds at eight of thirteen tracks, and qualifying speeds for that year's Indianapolis 500 exceeded 231 mph (372 km/h). To prevent further escalations in speed, the engine capacity of all IndyCar Series cars was reduced from 3.5 liters (0.92 U.S. gallons) to 3.0 liters (0.79 U.S. gallons) starting from the Indianapolis 500. The 3.5-liter engine displacement was still used in the first three races of the season, but a three- by twelve-inch slot was cut into the airbox and engine cover, behind the driver's head, in order to decrease positive airflow to the engine, thus acting as a power limiter. The new engine formula proved successful during a private test at the Indianapolis Motor Speedway on April 3, as none of the eight participating drivers went faster than 217 mph (349 km/h).

For two-day race weekends, each team was required to utilize the same engine for practice, qualifying, and the race. On three-day weekends, an engine change was permitted prior to qualifying. If a team were to swap engines after qualifications, they would be forced to start from the rear of the grid.

==== Fuel ====
The fuel capacity of the cars was decreased from 35 U.S. gallons (130 liters) to 30 U.S. gallons (110 liters), so that drivers made pit stops approximately every 60 miles (97 kilometres).

=== Sporting regulations ===
==== Points ====
Beginning in 2004, the cars that finished in nineteenth through twenty-fourth place earned twelve points, and cars in the final nine places received ten points. The previous system awarded eleven points to nineteenth place, one less point to every successive position to twenty-eighth, and one point to twenty-ninth place or lower. Additionally, the amount of bonus points for leading the most laps in a race increased from two to three.

==== Schedule ====
All private testing, with the exception of official open tests, were banned by the IRL to prevent teams from gaining an advantage. Rookie tests, which were previously completed during private tests, were conducted at the discretion of IRL officials. Each engine manufacturer was allotted three days of testing for their full-time teams at all tracks except the Indianapolis Motor Speedway.

== Season summary ==
=== Pre-season testing ===
The IndyCar Series' two pre-season open tests took place at Homestead–Miami Speedway on January 27–29 and at Phoenix International Raceway on February 10–12. Both tracks had undergone changes since their most recent race: Homestead's corners, originally banked at six degrees, were reconstructed to feature variable banking of eighteen degrees at the bottom, nineteen at the middle, and twenty at the top, along with newly installed SAFER barriers, while the exit of Phoenix's second turn was widened and a portion of the fourth turn was repaved after it was torn up to build a tunnel underneath. During the Homestead test, speeds were consistently over 10 mph (16 km/h) quicker than the 2003 pole speed, though the track's banked turns drew criticism from reigning champion Dixon. At the Phoenix test, many teams struggled to set up their cars properly due to their lack of downforce; however, Dixon's test-topping speed was slightly quicker than the pole speed from the 2003 race.

=== Opening rounds ===
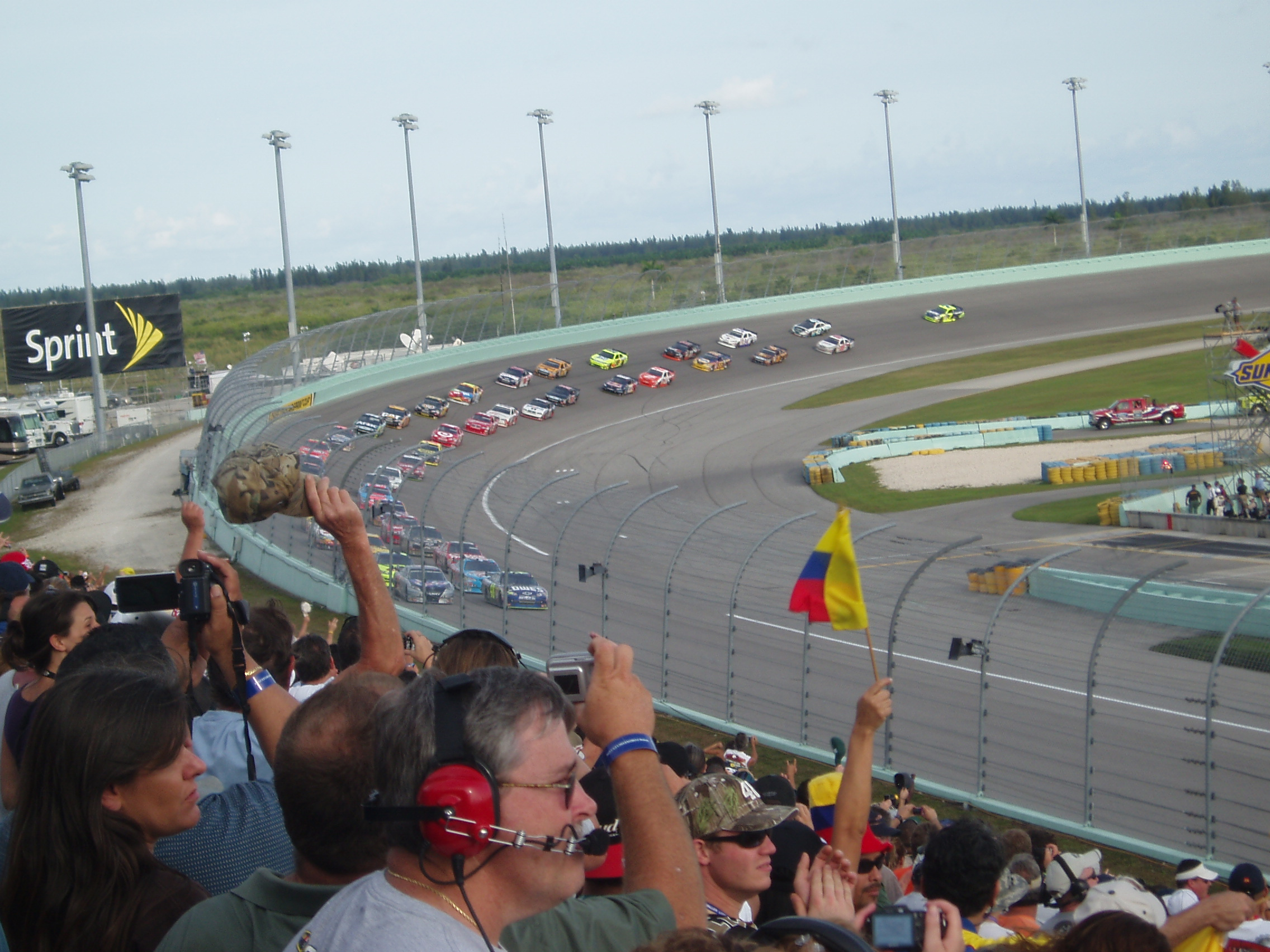
Homestead–Miami Speedway (pictured in 2009) was resurfaced with steeper banking in the turns, which journalists felt made for entertaining and safe racing.

For the third consecutive year, the IndyCar Series season began with the Toyota Indy 300 at Homestead. Rice took his and his team's first pole position, surpassing Kanaan's 2003 track record by almost 14 mph (23 km/h), but was relegated to seventh at the finish because of a punctured tire immediately after his first pit stop. Though Hornish started seventh, he advanced five positions in the first eight laps and ran in the second position for a majority of the race due to a well-handling car, while his Team Penske teammate Hélio Castroneves was the race's most dominant driver, leading 85 of 200 laps. Despite stalling his car during his penultimate pit stop, Wheldon took a calculated risk to opt against changing his tires in favor of filling up his fuel tank, which gave him the lead by lap 183. The strategy ultimately did not work, however, as the Team Penske duo made a three-wide maneuver to get by Wheldon on the 188th lap.

From there, Castroneves claimed the lead as Hornish made several unsuccessful attempts to overtake him on the high line over the next eleven laps. On the final lap, Hornish dove low entering turn one, forcing Castroneves to give him room. The two drivers remained alongside each other until Hornish pulled ahead at the final corner, earning his third win in his fourth start at Homestead by 0.0698 seconds over Castoneves, the tenth-closest finish in series history. Hornish became the first driver in the thirty-seven-year history of Team Penske to win in his first outing with the team. Wheldon fended off Toranosuke Takagi in the waning laps to take third place. Sixth-place Manning was criticized by several drivers and interrogated by IRL chief steward Brian Barnhart for driving that was deemed erratic, while his teammate Dixon spun into the attenuator at the end of the pit wall on lap 89 and finished next-to-last.

The lead-up to the Copper World Indy 200 at Phoenix was overshadowed by Fernández's controversial decision to divert from the Champ Car World Series to the IndyCar Series due to concerns over the former series' future. Andretti Green Racing locked out the front row of the grid, with Wheldon taking his first career pole position and Kanaan in second. Under an air temperature of 96 °F (36 °C), Kanaan swept by Wheldon for the lead on the opening lap and only ceded his position for nine laps during the first cycle of green-flag pit stops, even after a caution period for an incident involving Buhl, Scheckter, and Franchitti presented second-place Dixon an opportunity to take the lead. As a result, Kanaan earned his second consecutive victory at Phoenix. Both Team Penske drivers struggled with handling; Castroneves was placed a lap down early in the race before recovering to finish sixth, and Hornish slid into the wall on lap 82, putting him out of winning contention. Scott Sharp (who finished thirteenth) started his 84th IndyCar Series race, eclipsing Buddy Lazier's series record of 83 starts, while Fernández's unfamiliarity with his car caused him to accidentally break his transmission before the start of the race, thus ending his day prematurely. However, he learned to manage his gearbox by participating in a test organized by Honda at Phoenix one week later along with Kanaan, Herta, Yasukawa, and Rice.

Following a three-week break, the IndyCar Series teams traveled to Japan for the lone international round of the season and the final race with cars using 3.5-liter engines, the Indy Japan 300 at Twin Ring Motegi. From pole position, Wheldon led all but eight of 200 laps to take his first IndyCar Series victory—the first for a British driver in American open-wheel car racing since Mark Blundell won the 1997 Marlboro 500—and the first win for Honda in the seventh American open-wheel car race at their home track, with Andretti Green Racing teammate Kanaan in second. The victory gave Wheldon the Drivers' Championship lead for the first time in his career. Dixon recovered from a hairline fracture to his left ankle in a practice crash to finish fifth. Hornish suffered more misfortune, exiting the race after slamming the wall on lap 88 while trying to pass Matsuura.

=== Indianapolis 500 ===
Three weeks after the Motegi race, preparations for the 88th running of the Indianapolis 500 began with opening day practice on May 9. The first week of practice saw a gradual increase in speed from under 220 mph (350 km/h) on May 9 to over 222 mph (357 km/h) on May 12. However, on the first day of qualifications (Pole Day, May 15), morning rain showers and a cool air temperature of 60 °F (16 °C) made the track unusually slower to drive on, leading to Herta, Giaffone, and Barron crashing on the first lap of their qualifying attempts. To the surprise of many at the track, Rice took pole position with a four-lap average speed of 222.024 mph (357.313 km/h), outpacing second- and third-place qualifiers Wheldon and Franchitti by over 0.5 mph (0.80 km/h). Honda-powered cars took the top seven starting positions, despite speculation from pundits that their efforts to win at Motegi with 3.5-liter engines would hinder their development progress on their new 3.0-liter engines.

Twenty-two of the spots on the starting grid were filled on Pole Day, and four more were occupied the next day, but with only three other drivers in non-qualified cars taking part in practice, concerns were raised over whether the traditional thirty-three car grid would be filled. After four additional practice days, several additional car-driver combinations were announced and Ray took to the track for the first time all month to complete twenty practice laps on the last day of qualifying (May 23), thus ensuring that the field would consist of thirty-three cars. 1996–97 IRL and 2002 NASCAR Winston Cup Series champion Tony Stewart intended to qualify for A. J. Foyt Racing, but with thirty-five minutes left in the qualifying session, he was told by his agent Cary Agajanian that his contract with his NASCAR team Joe Gibbs Racing prevented him from doing so.

"Our car was really rolling. When it got time to go, that we knew it was going to be probably a shortened race, we had to stand on it and get going. So we started coming back through everybody and [chief strategist] Scott [Roembke] was watching the weather. He knew where we're at and what I was doing. All of a sudden, it turned into go time in the last little bit and we were able to get it done before the rain got there. Our stuff was mega at the end when it needed to be."

— Buddy Rice discussing his Indianapolis 500 victory with Autoweek in 2023.

Though he was considered a longshot for the Indianapolis 500, Rice recovered from stalling his car during a pit stop on the 95th lap to win the race, becoming the first American driver to do so since Eddie Cheever in 1998 and the first winner of the race to use a Honda engine. He was also the eighteenth driver to earn his first American open-wheel car racing victory in the event. Rain showers delayed the start of the race by two hours and eleven minutes and first halted the race on lap 27, which forced Gordon to hand his seat over to Jaques Lazier when the race resumed and travel to Charlotte, North Carolina for the Coca-Cola 600, ultimately finishing three laps behind the leaders in twentieth. With more looming rain, drivers were forced to gamble on which lap to make their final pit stops. Rice made his on the 167th lap and cycled back to the lead four laps later, maintaining his position until rain fell over the track on lap 174. After a six-lap caution period, the race ended on lap 180, twenty laps short of its scheduled distance. It was the first rain-shortened Indianapolis 500 since 1976. A nearby F2 tornado forced post-race festivities to take place in the Gasoline Alley garage area.

Behind Rice were Andretti Green Racing teammates Kanaan, Wheldon (whose championship advantage over Kanaan had diminished to one point), and Herta. Eighth-place Dixon was the highest-finishing Toyota driver, and Barron in twelfth was the top Chevrolet driver. Castroneves was relegated to ninth place after overshooting his pit stall entry, while teammate Hornish made two unscheduled pit stops to repair his fuel hose and was collected in a lap-105 incident with Manning and Ray, the latter of whom claimed to have needed a top-ten finish in the race to keep his team afloat. Matsuura's eleventh-place result earned him the race's Rookie of the Year award. Both A. J. Foyt Enterprises cars had crashed within the first fifty-six laps, leaving owner A. J. Foyt so frustrated that he chose not to answer any questions from reporters in the garage.

=== Mid-season rounds ===
Motorsports journalist John Oreovicz of ESPN wrote that "an undeniable sense of wariness" clouded many IndyCar Series teams as they headed to Texas Motor Speedway for the first time since Kenny Bräck's devastating crash during the series' last race at the track in October 2003. The Bombardier 500 saw eleven collisions, but the cars' slower speeds and the track's new SAFER barriers helped prevent any driver injuries, drawing praise from drivers and league officials.

Kanaan took the victory in the race after overtaking Wheldon during a restart on lap 188 and led Franchitti to a one–two finish for Andretti Green Racing. His win propelled him to the Drivers' Championship lead. Wheldon and Castroneves attempted to avoid pitting for the last seventy-two laps and assumed the top-two positions for the final restart, but they both quickly fell down the running order and retired from the race within ten laps of the finish. It marked the first time in ten races that Wheldon failed to secure a top-ten finish. Barron recovered from a twenty-second starting position due to a faulty gearbox to achieve Chevrolet's first podium finish of the season in third. Rice competed with the other leaders throughout the majority of the race, but broke a drive shaft after contacting Manning's tires entering the third turn on lap 180. Hornish, who bent pieces of his rear suspension while veering high to avoid the two drivers, soldiered on to a fourth-place result.

A recent repaving at Richmond International Raceway allowed eleven drivers to break the track record set by Gil de Ferran in 2002, including pole-sitter Castroneves, who described the new track surface as "smooth as a baby’s butt". He and Hornish dominated the first half of the race, gaining an advantage of up to six seconds over their fellow competitors on restarts. Wheldon, who started in twentieth, had been lapped by Hornish during an early green-flag stint, but he was able to produce good enough fuel mileage to avoid pitting for the final 121 laps. His risky strategy led him to victory when he took the lead for good on the 192nd lap as Franchitti and Castroneves made pit stops and drove to victory in the SunTrust Indy Challenge. The race finish was not without controversy, however: a late caution period concluded with one lap remaining in the race, and Castroneves quickly overtook Meira for second place, as did Kanaan to Herta for fourth, but because the track's caution lights remained on, the IRL used the lap-249 running order as the finishing results, thus nullifying both passes.

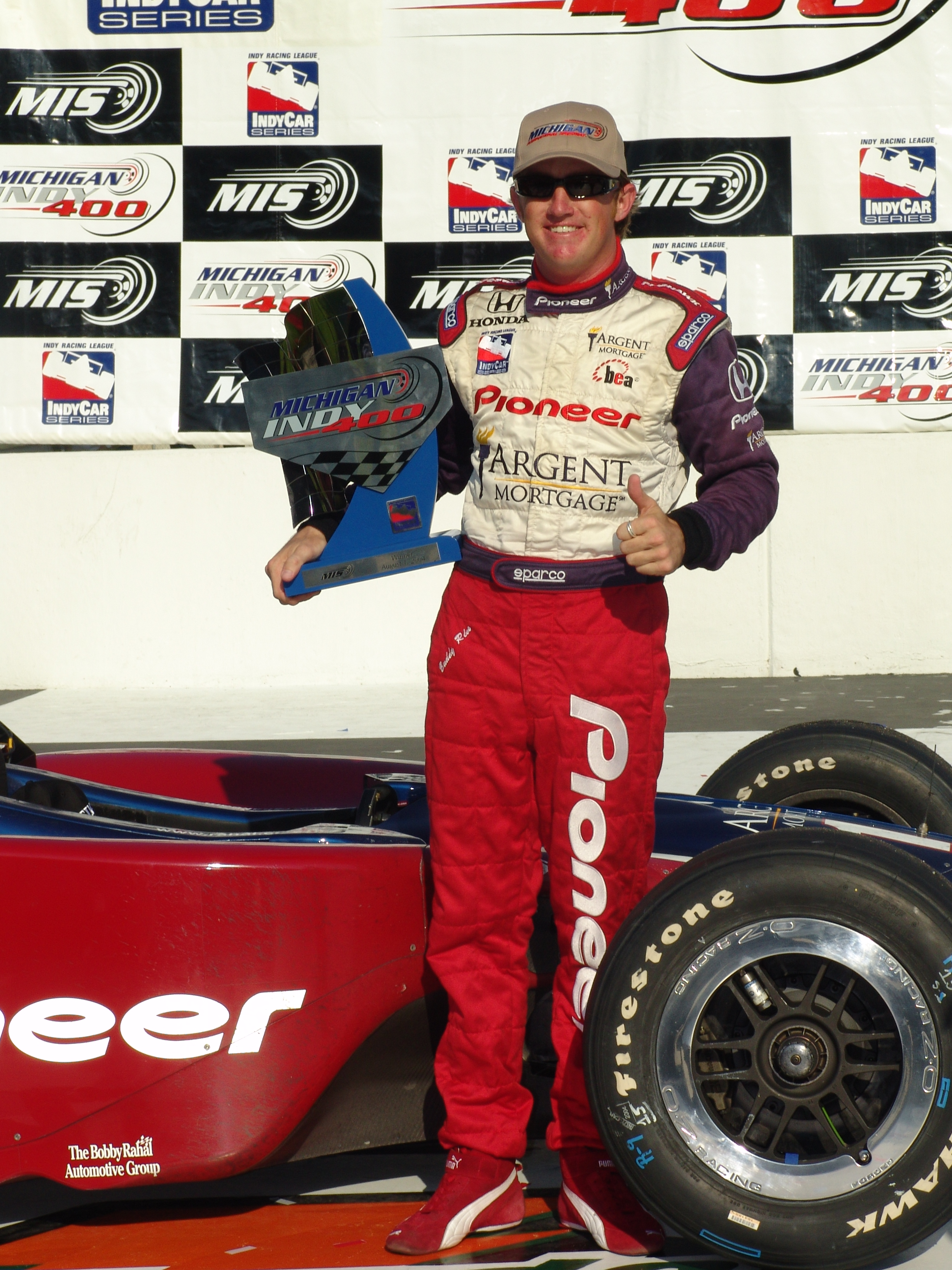
Buddy Rice (pictured in the 2004 Michigan Indy 400) earned all three of his IndyCar Series wins in the 2004 season.

After a collision between Simmons and Matsuura necessitated a caution flag on lap 175, Rahal Letterman Racing drivers pole-sitter Rice and Meira (who led a combined total of 120 laps) raced wheel-to-wheel with each other and traded the lead several times over the final ten laps of the Argent Mortgage 300 at Kansas Speedway. Rice won the race by a scant 0.0051 seconds over Meira, the second-closest finish in IndyCar Series history, to advance to third place in the Drivers' Championship. Third-place finisher Kanaan widened his championship advantage from fifteen to twenty-eight points over Wheldon, who finished a lap behind the leaders in ninth because of a pit stop miscue on lap 54. Honda continued to showcase their strength in the IndyCar Series with a top-six sweep in the race; tenth-place Barron was the only Chevrolet driver in the top-ten.

For the Firestone Indy 200 at Nashville Superspeedway, Rice lapped three hundredths of a second quicker than Meira to take pole position, but he fell to sixth place at the finish after locking wheels with Wheldon while attempting to pass him for the lead on a lap-177 restart and subsequently pitting to repair a damaged right-front wing. Wheldon was able to maintain his position, but ran over a piece of debris during a caution period for the collision and made two pit stops for new tires that dropped him to thirteenth. Despite brushing against Rice's car after his contact with Wheldon, Kanaan escaped without any damage; he held onto the lead for the final eighteen laps and fended off Hornish's last-lap charge to win the race, further padding out his championship lead to sixty-one points ahead of Wheldon. Meira seemed poised to take his first IndyCar Series win after dominating much of the first half of the race, but his car stalled as he exited pit road with his fuel hose still attached. He was then hindered by transmission issues that slowed his pace for the final fifteen laps.

Dixon did not participate in the next race, the Menards A. J. Foyt Indy 225, after injuring his right knee and left ankle in a qualifying crash. As of 2026, it is the only American open-wheel car race that Dixon has missed since joining the sport in 2001. Franchitti took advantage of a lap-39 caution to replace his tires and "came to life" from that point on. He first took the lead by passing Castroneves on the 106th lap and was unchallenged until a pit stop sequence under caution allowed Hornish to pass him. However, as Hornish struggled to regain pace on worn tires, Franchitti quickly got by him on the ensuing lap-147 restart and held off Rice for the remaining laps to earn his first IndyCar Series victory, becoming the second Scotsman to win a motor race at the Milwaukee Mile after Jim Clark did so in 1963. Rice's runner-up finish promoted him to second place in the championship ahead of Wheldon, who exited the race with a broken drive shaft on the 147th lap. Kanaan, who finished third, increased his championship advantage to sixty-four points.

The Michigan Indy 400 at Michigan International Speedway had the fourth-quickest average race speed in IndyCar Series history—182.123 mph (293.099 km/h). Pole-sitter Kanaan led a total of 184 laps, including the first 126, and only relinquished his position during pit stop cycles until he was ordered to let Rice pass him on the 190th lap, due to his team's mistaken belief that Rice would run out of fuel before the finish. Instead, Rice maintained his position and held off Kanaan, who made an attempt to reclaim the lead on the outside line but came up 0.0796 seconds short. Rice's win allowed him to decrease Kanaan's championship lead to fifty-seven points. The only crashes during the race occurred on pit road: on lap 36, Scheckter hit his mechanic Steve Namisnak as he swerved to avoid Takagi, fracturing Namisnak's right tibia. Fernández spun Meira into Wheldon's right-front tire changer on lap 123 and collided into Matsuura's right-front tire changer seven laps later, but no injuries were reported for either incident.

=== Closing rounds and championship conclusion ===
At the next race, the Belterra Casino Indy 300, Fernández quickly advanced from his fourth-place starting position to battle with Kanaan for the lead until he overtook him on the 90th lap. An elongated pit stop caused by a jammed impact wrench relegated him to tenth just past the halfway point of the 200-lap race, but the last pit stop sequence moved him up to sixth before he reclaimed the lead from Rice shortly after a restart on lap 152. He successfully defended his lead over the final forty-eight laps to achieve his first IndyCar Series win, reaching the checkered flag 0.0581 seconds before Rice in what was the closest finish in the history of Kentucky Speedway and the ninth-closest in the series. It was also Honda's tenth consecutive win, earning them their first Engine Manufacturers' Championship in their second year of IndyCar Series competition. Kanaan led a race-high 126 laps, but lagged back to fifth place after sustaining an undetermined issue with his car, thus surrendering seven more points to Rice.

In what was described as a "snooze fest", Franchitti led 128 laps en route to victory in the Honda Indy 225 at Pikes Peak International Raceway, the track that he last raced at prior to his back surgery that curtailed his 2003 season. His lone setback was accidentally tearing ligaments in his fuel man Mike Miller's knee after exiting his pit stall with his fuel hose attached and knocking Miller to the ground during his first pit stop. Hornish, Franchitti's biggest threat to victory at the middle portion of the race, was taken out of contention when he crashed on lap 157. On the opening lap, Rice's championship hopes were hindered when he bumped into Scheckter on the back stretch and slammed into the inside wall; he left the race weekend trailing Kanaan, who finished fifth, by sixty-eight points.

The Firestone Indy 225 was celebrated as the 100th IndyCar Series race and the final race for Nazareth Speedway, which shut down at the end of the year because of poor attendance. Wheldon moved his way up from eighth to fifth in the first fifty laps, and advanced another position thirteen laps later by virtue of a quicker pit stop than his other competitors. After Hornish set off a methanol fire by tearing a fuel hose open, Wheldon claimed the lead on the 146th lap. He did not fill up his fuel tank on his last stop, but was able to save fuel during two caution periods and was unchallenged for the final seventy-nine laps to take the win. His teammates Kanaan and Franchitti finished in second and third, respectively, marking the first one–two–three team sweep in series history. Rice accused Franchitti of blocking him through radio communications; his fourth-place finish demoted him to third in the championship behind Wheldon, whose gap to Kanaan increased to seventy-two points. Andretti Green Racing owner and Nazareth, Pennsylvania native Michael Andretti stated that it was "the biggest win in my career as a team owner," but expressed sorrow over the fate of his family's home track.

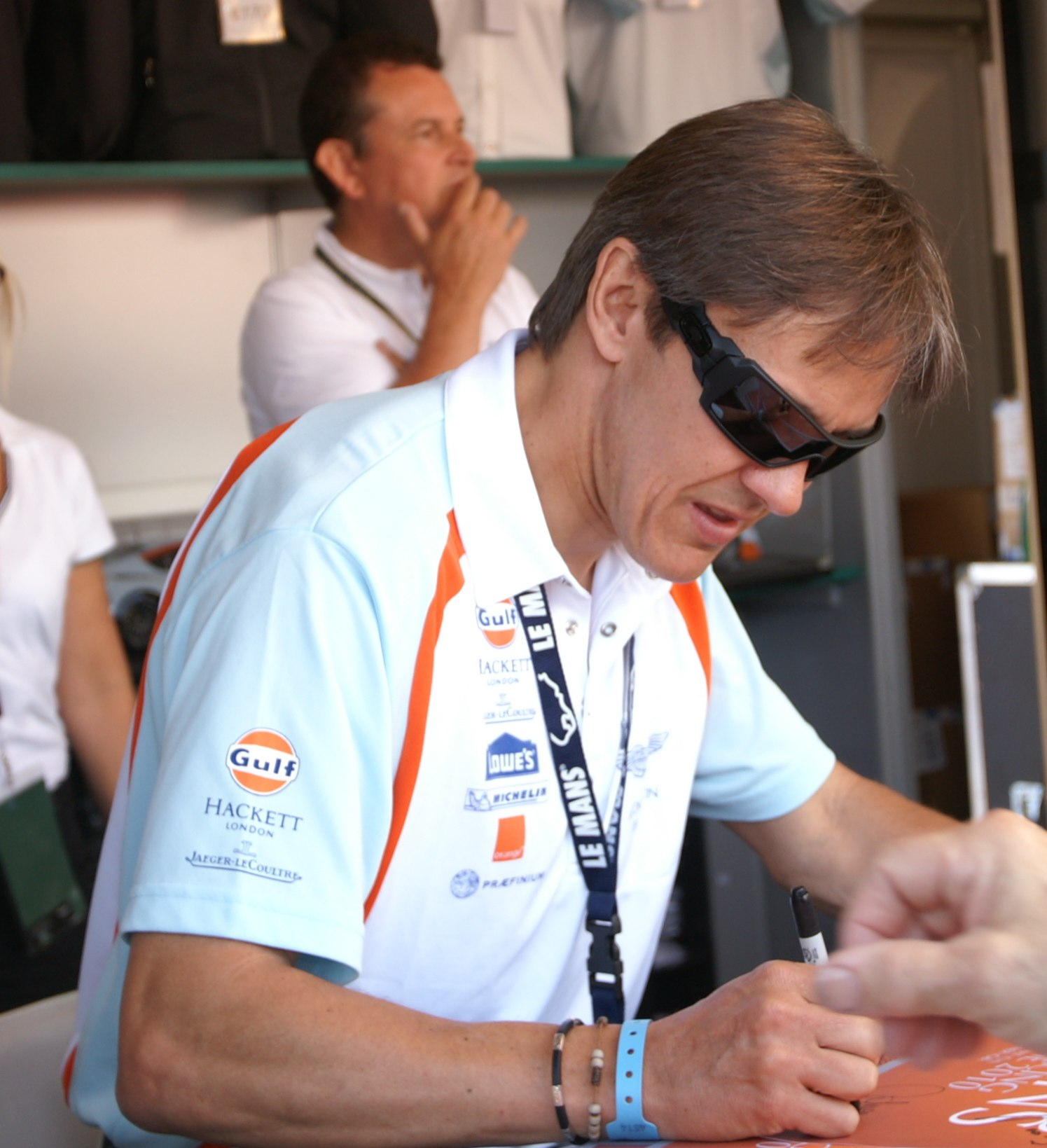
Adrián Fernández (pictured in 2010) won three races in his only full-time IndyCar Series season after departing the rival Champ Car World Series.

The Delphi Indy 300 at Chicagoland Speedway was overshadowed by Rice's crash on lap 186, in which his left-rear tire was clipped by Manning's right-front tire, sending Rice airborne and upside-down on the back stretch. Rice escaped the crash with scorch marks on his helmet but no injuries. Despite being set back by a broken air jack during his first pit stop, which forced his crew to manually lift his car to change tires, a resilient Fernández utilized an alternate strategy to stay in contention. He last pitted on lap 137 and, after taking the lead twelve laps later, was aided by two cautions (the first lasting twenty-two laps) to conserve fuel. He was passed by Herta on the 182nd lap, but reclaimed the lead the following lap. After Rice's crash, Fernández successfully fended off Herta on the final six-lap restart, winning his second race of the season.

Entering the penultimate round of the season at California Speedway, Kanaan had a seventy-five-point advantage over Wheldon and a ninety-five-point gap over Rice, which meant that he needed to finish fourth or better to clinch the title. An engine issue that prevented Kanaan from making a qualifying attempt did not deter him, as he improved his position from last to second in the first fifteen laps. Castroneves commanded most of the Toyota Indy 400, leading 145 laps, but after a caution for debris, Kanaan charged by him for the lead on the ensuing lap-178 restart. Thirteen laps later, Fernández began to press Kanaan for the lead until Tomáš Enge spun and collected Scheckter, thus prompting a caution on lap 194. Fernández had beaten Kanaan to the start-finish line, but IRL officials determined that Kanaan was ahead of Fernández at the moment that the caution was issued. On the last-lap shootout, Fernández used Kanaan's slipstream to gain momentum on the outside line in turn three. He won the race over Kanaan by 0.0183 seconds, the seventh-closest finish in series history, but Kanaan's second-place finish still earned him enough points to secure his first Drivers' Championship. It was also the first title for Michael Andretti as a team owner. Wheldon was taken out of title contention when he was handed a drive-through penalty late in the race for blocking Hornish, which Wheldon later considered a "very bad call," though he overtook four drivers on the last lap to take third place. Rice finished in fifth.

Castroneves took a record-tying fourth consecutive pole position and went on to win the season-ending Chevy 500 at Texas Motor Speedway, his first victory since Nazareth in 2003. It also ended Honda's streak of fourteen consecutive wins. Even after he faltered to sixth on lap 110 because of a slow pit stop, he rallied to reclaim the lead from Wheldon and Kanaan on the 180th lap. A caution was issued five laps later when Franchitti—racing with a broken bone in his left foot from a practice crash the day prior—slammed the turn-four wall and pinned Barron, who was diagnosed with a mild concussion, a chipped bone in his left foot, and a laceration to his hand. The caution period was extended to allow safety marshals to extract Barron from his car, setting up a two-lap sprint to the finish. Castroneves quickly pulled out a large lead over his fellow competitors to win the race, while Kanaan finished 0.0018 seconds ahead of Wheldon for second place. After the race, however, the two Andretti Green Racing drivers expressed their belief that Castroneves accelerated too quickly on the restart. Upon further review, IRL officials determined that Castroneves had jumped the restart and penalized him with a $50,000 fine and a loss of fifteen points, but the race results were still upheld.

Kanaan was noted by journalists for his consistency throughout the 2004 season: after finishing eighth in the season-opening round at Homestead, he finished no worse than fifth for the rest of the season. He also completed all 3,305 race laps of the season, believed to be the first time a driver accomplished such a feat in a top-level racing series, and broke a series record for most laps led in a season (889). His team Andretti Green Racing combined to win eight of the season's sixteen races—three each by Kanaan and Wheldon and two by Franchitti.

== Results and standings ==
=== Races ===
Round	Race	Pole position	Fastest lap	Most laps led	Race winner				Report
Round	Race	Pole position	Fastest lap	Most laps led	Driver	Team	Chassis	Engine	Report
1	Homestead	(United States) Buddy Rice	(United States) Sam Hornish Jr.	(Brazil) Hélio Castroneves	(United States) Sam Hornish Jr.	Marlboro Team Penske	Dallara	Toyota	Report
2	Phoenix	(United Kingdom) Dan Wheldon	(United Kingdom) Darren Manning	(Brazil) Tony Kanaan	(Brazil) Tony Kanaan	Andretti Green Racing	Dallara	Honda	Report
3	Motegi	(United Kingdom) Dan Wheldon	(United Kingdom) Dan Wheldon	(United Kingdom) Dan Wheldon	(United Kingdom) Dan Wheldon	Andretti Green Racing	Dallara	Honda	Report
4	Indianapolis	(United States) Buddy Rice	(Brazil) Vítor Meira	(United States) Buddy Rice	(United States) Buddy Rice	Rahal Letterman Racing	G-Force	Honda	Report
5	Texas 1	(United Kingdom) Dario Franchitti	(Brazil) Vítor Meira	(Brazil) Tony Kanaan	(Brazil) Tony Kanaan	Andretti Green Racing	Dallara	Honda	Report
6	Richmond	(Brazil) Hélio Castroneves	(United States) Sam Hornish Jr.	(United Kingdom) Dario Franchitti	(United Kingdom) Dan Wheldon	Andretti Green Racing	Dallara	Honda	Report
7	Kansas	(United States) Buddy Rice	(South Africa) Tomas Scheckter	(United States) Buddy Rice	(United States) Buddy Rice	Rahal Letterman Racing	G-Force	Honda	Report
8	Nashville	(United States) Buddy Rice	(Brazil) Vítor Meira	(Brazil) Vítor Meira	(Brazil) Tony Kanaan	Andretti Green Racing	Dallara	Honda	Report
9	Milwaukee	(Brazil) Vítor Meira	(United Kingdom) Dario Franchitti	(United Kingdom) Dario Franchitti	(United Kingdom) Dario Franchitti	Andretti Green Racing	Dallara	Honda	Report
10	Michigan	(Brazil) Tony Kanaan	(United Kingdom) Darren Manning	(Brazil) Tony Kanaan	(United States) Buddy Rice	Rahal Letterman Racing	G-Force	Honda	Report
11	Kentucky	(United States) Buddy Rice	(Brazil) Vítor Meira	(Brazil) Tony Kanaan	(Mexico) Adrián Fernández	Fernández Racing	G-Force	Honda	Report
12	Pikes Peak	(Brazil) Tony Kanaan	(United Kingdom) Dan Wheldon	(United Kingdom) Dario Franchitti	(United Kingdom) Dario Franchitti	Andretti Green Racing	Dallara	Honda	Report
13	Nazareth	(Brazil) Hélio Castroneves	(United States) Sam Hornish Jr.	(Brazil) Hélio Castroneves	(United Kingdom) Dan Wheldon	Andretti Green Racing	Dallara	Honda	Report
14	Chicagoland	(Brazil) Hélio Castroneves	(Brazil) Vítor Meira	(Mexico) Adrián Fernández	(Mexico) Adrián Fernández	Fernández Racing	G-Force	Honda	Report
15	Fontana	(Brazil) Hélio Castroneves	(Brazil) Vítor Meira	(Brazil) Hélio Castroneves	(Mexico) Adrián Fernández	Fernández Racing	G-Force	Honda	Report
16	Texas 2	(Brazil) Hélio Castroneves	(United States) Bryan Herta	(Brazil) Hélio Castroneves	(Brazil) Hélio Castroneves	Marlboro Team Penske	Dallara	Toyota	Report

=== Scoring system ===
Points were awarded to the competitors of each race using the following structure:

Position	**1st**	**2nd**	**3rd**	**4th**	**5th**	**6th**	**7th**	**8th**	**9th**	**10th**	**11th**	**12th**	**13th**	**14th**	**15th**	**16th**	**17th**	**18th–24th**	**25th–33rd**
Points	50	40	35	32	30	28	26	24	22	20	19	18	17	16	15	14	13	12	10

Three bonus points were awarded to the driver that led the most race laps. In the event that a driver participated in an event but could not start the race, the driver and its entry would be classified in the final starting position and receive full points.

=== Drivers' Championship standings ===
Pos.	Driver	HOM	PHX	MOT	IND	TMS1	RIC	KAN	NSS	MIL	MIS	KEN	PPR	NAZ	CHI	CAL	TMS2	Points
1	(Brazil) Tony Kanaan	8	1*	2	2	1*	5	3	1	4	**2***	5*	**5**	2	3	2	2	618
2	(United Kingdom) Dan Wheldon	3	**3**	**1***	3	13	1	9	13	18	3	3	3	1	4	3	3	533
3	(United States) Buddy Rice	**7**	9	6	**1***	15	6	**1***	**6**	2	1	**2**	22	4	14	5	20	485
4	(Brazil) Hélio Castroneves	2*	6	3	9	12	**3**	7	3	12	10	12	6	**5***	**10**	**7***	**1***	446 (Note: Hélio Castroneves was docked 15 points for jumping the final restart of the Chevy 500; the penalty did not affect his championship position.)
5	(Mexico) Adrián Fernández		20	18	7	5	7	6	10	8	12	1	2	7	1*	1	5	445
6	(United Kingdom) Dario Franchitti	17	17	7	14	**2**	12*	4	20	1*	22	6	1*	3	20	6	15	409
7	(United States) Sam Hornish Jr.	1	15	19	26	4	13	8	2	3	4	14	18	11	6	4	17	387
8	(Brazil) Vítor Meira			17	6	6	2	2	12*	**5**	5	7	7	10	5	21	4	376
9	(United States) Bryan Herta	13	7	14	4	19	4	5	18	9	6	9	9	8	2	17	16	362
10	(New Zealand) Scott Dixon	18	2	5	8	14	8	12	8	DNS	7	13	20	9	7	8	6	355
11	(United Kingdom) Darren Manning	6	5	4	25	8	20	11	4	19	13	10	4	6	15	DNS		323
12	(United States) Alex Barron	16	4	12	12	3	22	10	17	7	11	11	10	12	12	18	14	310
13	(United States) Scott Sharp	9	13	9	13	18	9	20	14	15	9	17	15	19	9	11	8	282
14	(Japan) Kosuke Matsuura RY	11	11	8	11	16	14	18	9	10	17	4	13	21	21	13	19	280
15	(Japan) Tora Takagi	4	8	10	19	10	19	21	11	20	20	20	19	17	13	14	12	263
16	(United States) Ed Carpenter R	12	19	22	31	21	16	14	22	11	14	8	11	20	11	12	21	245
17	(United Kingdom) Mark Taylor R	19	12	16	30	17	18		7	14	21	19	14	22	17	10	7	232
18	(United States) A. J. Foyt IV	15	14	15	33	22	11	13	16	16	15	18	21	15	16	19	10	232
19	(South Africa) Tomas Scheckter	5	16	13	18	20	17	15	19	21	19	22	17	13	19	15	18	230
20	(Brazil) Felipe Giaffone				15	9	10	16	15	13	16	16	16	16	8	20	11	214
21	(United States) Townsend Bell							17	5	6	8	21	12	18	22	9	9	193
22	(United States) Jaques Lazier				RL				21	17	18	15	8	14	18			104
23	(United States) Greg Ray	14	10	20	27	7	15											99
24	(United States) Robbie Buhl	10	18	21														44
25	(United States) Al Unser Jr.				17	11	21											44
26	(United States) Roger Yasukawa			11	10													39
27	(Czech Republic) Tomáš Enge R															16	13	31
28	(Brazil) Bruno Junqueira				5													30
29	(United States) Jeff Simmons R				16			19										26
30	(United States) Richie Hearn				20													12
31	(United States) Sarah Fisher				21													12
32	(United States) Robby McGehee				22													12
33	(United States) Buddy Lazier				23													12
34	(Canada) Marty Roth R				24													12
35	(United States) P. J. Jones				28													10
36	(United States) Robby Gordon				29													10
37	(United States) Larry Foyt R				32													10
Pos.	Driver	HOM	PHX	MOT	IND	TMS1	RIC	KAN	NSS	MIL	MIS	KEN	PPR	NAZ	CHI	CAL	TMS2	Points

Color	Result
Gold	Winner
Silver	2nd place
Bronze	3rd place
Green	4th & 5th place
Light Blue	6th–10th place
Dark Blue	Other finishing position
Purple	Did not finish
Red	Did not qualify (DNQ)
Brown	Withdrawn (Wth)
Black	Disqualified (DSQ)
White	Did not start (DNS)
White	Relief driver (RL)
Blank	Did not participate

**In-line notation**
**Bold**	Pole position
Italics	Ran fastest race lap
*	Led most race laps
RY	Rookie of the Year
R	Rookie

=== Entrants' Championship standings ===
Entrants' Championship points were scored with the same system as the Drivers' Championship.

Pos.	No.	Entrant	HOM	PHX	MOT	IND	TMS1	RIC	KAN	NSS	MIL	MIS	KEN	PPR	NAZ	CHI	CAL	TMS2	Points
1	11	Andretti Green Racing	8	1*	2	2	1*	5	3	1	4	**2***	5*	**5**	2	3	2	2	618
2	26	Andretti Green Racing	3	**3**	**1***	3	13	1	9	13	18	3	3	3	1	4	3	3	533
3	15	Rahal Letterman Racing	**7**	9	6	**1***	15	6	**1***	**6**	2	1	**2**	22	4	14	5	20	485
4	3	Marlboro Team Penske	2*	6	3	9	12	**3**	7	3	12	10	12	6	**5***	**10**	**7***	**1***	446
5	5	Fernández Racing		20	18	7	5	7	6	10	8	12	1	2	7	1*	1	5	445
6	27	Andretti Green Racing	17	17	7	14	**2**	12*	4	20	1*	22	6	1*	3	20	6	15	409
7	6	Marlboro Team Penske	1	15	19	26	4	13	8	2	3	4	14	18	11	6	4	17	387
8	17	Rahal Letterman Racing			17	6	6	2	2	12*	**5**	5	7	7	10	5	21	4	376
9	7	Andretti Green Racing	13	7	14	4	19	4	5	18	9	6	9	9	8	2	17	16	362
10	1	Chip Ganassi Racing	18	2	5	8	14	8	12	8	DNS	7	13	20	9	7	8	6	355
11	10	Chip Ganassi Racing	6	5	4	25	8	20	11	4	19	13	10	4	6	15	DNS		323
12	51	Red Bull Cheever Racing	16	4	12	12	3	22	10	17	7	11	11	10	12	12	18	14	310
13	8	Kelley Racing	9	13	9	13	18	9	20	14	15	9	17	15	19	9	11	8	282
14	55	Super Aguri Fernández Racing	11	11	8	11	16	14	18	9	10	17	4	13	21	21	13	19	280
15	2	Panther Racing	19	12	16	30	17	18	17	5	6	8	21	12	18	22	9	9	272
16	12	Pioneer Mo Nunn Racing	4	8	10	19	10	19	21	11	20	20	20	19	17	13	14	12	263
17	24	Dreyer & Reinbold Racing	10	18	21	15	9	10	16	15	13	16	16	16	16	8	20	11	258
18	13	Access Motorsports	14	10	20	27	7	15		7	14	21	19	14	22	17	10	7	252
19	52	Red Bull Cheever Racing	12	19	22	31	21	16	14	22	11	14	8	11	20	11	12	21	245
20	14	A. J. Foyt Enterprises	15	14	15	33	22	11	13	16	16	15	18	21	15	16	19	10	232
21	4	Panther Racing	5	16	13	18	20	17	15	19	21	19	22	17	13	19	15	18	230
22	20	Patrick Racing				17	11	21	19	21	17	18	15	8	14	18	16	13	191
23	16	Rahal Letterman Racing			11	10													39
24	36	Newman/Haas Racing				5													30
25	21	Pioneer Mo Nunn Racing				16													14
26	18	PDM Racing				22													12
27	25	Roth Racing				24													12
28	33	Sam Schmidt Motorsports				20													12
29	39	Kelley Racing				21													12
30	91	Dreyer & Reinbold/Hemelgarn Racing				23													12
31	41	A. J. Foyt Enterprises				32													10
32	70	Robby Gordon Motorsports				29													10
33	98	CURB/Agajanian/Beck Motorsports				28													10
Pos.	No.	Entrant	HOM	PHX	MOT	IND	TMS1	RIC	KAN	NSS	MIL	MIS	KEN	PPR	NAZ	CHI	CAL	TMS2	Points

=== Engine Manufacturers' Championship standings ===
The Engine Manufacturers' Championship utilized a different scoring system from the Drivers' and Entrants' Championships; the highest-finishing engine would earn ten points, the second-highest would earn seven, and the third-highest would earn five.

Pos.	Manufacturer	HOM	PHX	MOT	IND	TMS1	RIC	KAN	NSS	MIL	MIS	KEN	PPR	NAZ	CHI	CAL	TMS2	Points
1	Honda	3	1	1	1	1	1	1	1	1	1	1	1	1	1	1	2	154
1	Honda	7	10	10	10	10	10	10	10	10	10	10	10	10	10	10	7	154
2	Toyota	1	2	3	8	4	3	7	2	3	4	10	4	4	5	6	1	114
2	Toyota	10	7	7	7	5	7	7	7	7	7	5	7	7	7	7	10	114
3	Chevrolet	5	4	12	12	3	10	10	5	6	8	8	8	12	8	9	9	84
3	Chevrolet	5	5	5	5	7	5	5	5	5	5	7	5	5	5	5	5	84
Pos.	Manufacturer	HOM	PHX	MOT	IND	TMS1	RIC	KAN	NSS	MIL	MIS	KEN	PPR	NAZ	CHI	CAL	TMS2	Points

=== Chassis Manufacturers' Championship standings ===
Chassis Manufacturers' Championship points were scored with the same system as the Engine Manufacturers' Championship, with the results of the chassis being taken into account.

Pos.	Manufacturer	HOM	PHX	MOT	IND	TMS1	RIC	KAN	NSS	MIL	MIS	KEN	PPR	NAZ	CHI	CAL	TMS2	Points
1	Dallara	1	1	1	2	1	1	3	1	1	2	3	1	1	2	2	1	142
1	Dallara	10	10	10	7	10	10	7	10	10	7	7	10	10	7	7	10	142
2	G-Force	6	2	4	1	5	2	1	4	2	1	1	2	4	1	1	4	130
2	G-Force	7	7	7	10	7	7	10	7	7	10	10	7	7	10	10	7	130
Pos.	Manufacturer	HOM	PHX	MOT	IND	TMS1	RIC	KAN	NSS	MIL	MIS	KEN	PPR	NAZ	CHI	CAL	TMS2	Points
