= Access Motorsports =

(United States) Access Motorsports
- Owner(s): Greg Ray, Ted Bitting
- Base: Indianapolis, Indiana
- Series: IndyCar Series
- Race drivers: Greg Ray, Mark Taylor
- Manufacturer: G-Force
- Opened: 2003
- Closed: 2004

Career
- Debut: 2003 Indianapolis 500
- Latest race: 2004 Chevy 500 (Texas)
- Races competed: 29
- Drivers' Championships: 0
- Race victories: 0
- Pole positions: 0

Access Motorsports was an American auto racing team that competed in the IndyCar Series from 2003-2004. Founded by 1999 Indy Racing League champion Greg Ray after failing to find a ride for the 2003 season, the team debuted at the 2003 Indianapolis 500 and ran the rest of the season with Ray as owner/driver. He would finish 15th in the points standings. Access Motorsports was the only team that year to run a G-Force chassis and a Honda engine, with Honda also making its debut that season. The combo was not particularly competitive, with Ray never finishing higher than 8th and only ever qualifying as high as 5th. The package was reliable, however, as the car only had one DNF out of thirteen starts.

The 2004 season was much less consistent for the team, both on and off the track. Despite a sponsorship deal from Renovac and a front-row start at the third race at Motegi, the team struggled in the first three races and Renovac withdrew its sponsorship prior to the 2004 Indianapolis 500. Ray was fortunate enough to sign a one-race deal with Rent-A-Center, but for the next two races at Texas and Richmond the team was forced to race without sponsorship.

This took an economic toll on the team, and as a result they were forced to skip the following race at Kansas. The team was able to scrape together another sponsorship deal for the rest of the season, and as a result Ray stepped away from the driver's seat and handed it to rookie Mark Taylor. Once again, the team struggled for results, although it did score a best finish of 7th place three times, one by Ray and two by Taylor.

But despite Ray's best efforts to find sponsorship for the 2005 season, none was forthcoming. As a result, the team shut down before the start of the season and Ray officially retired from open-wheel racing.

== Race results ==
=== IndyCar Series results ===
(key)

| Year | Chassis | Engine | Drivers | No. | 1 | 2 | 3 | 4 | 5 | 6 | 7 | 8 | 9 | 10 | 11 | 12 | 13 | 14 | 15 | 16 | Pts Pos | Pos |
|---|---|---|---|---|---|---|---|---|---|---|---|---|---|---|---|---|---|---|---|---|---|---|
| 2003 | | | | | HMS | PHX | MOT | INDY | TXS | PPIR | RIR | KAN | NSH | MCH | GAT | KTY | NAZ | CHI | FON | TXS | | |
| 2003 | G-Force GF09 | Honda HI3R V8 | (United States) Greg Ray | 13 | | | 9 | 8 | 11 | 18 | 12 | 8 | 16 | 10 | 8 | 15 | 17 | DNS | 14 | 8 | 15th | 253 |
| 2004 | | | | | HMS | PHX | MOT | INDY | TXS | RIR | KAN | NSH | MIL | MCH | KTY | PPIR | NAZ | CHI | FON | TXS | | |
| 2004 | G-Force GF09B | Honda HI4R V8 | (United States) Greg Ray | 13 | 14 | 10 | 20 | 27 | 7 | 15 | | | | | | | | | | | 23rd | 99 |
| 2004 | G-Force GF09B | Honda HI4R V8 | (United Kingdom) Mark Taylor (R) | 13 | | | | | | | | 7 | 14 | 21 | 19 | 14 | 22 | 17 | 10 | 7 | 17th | 232 |
