= Honda Indy V8 =

Car engine used for the IndyCar Series

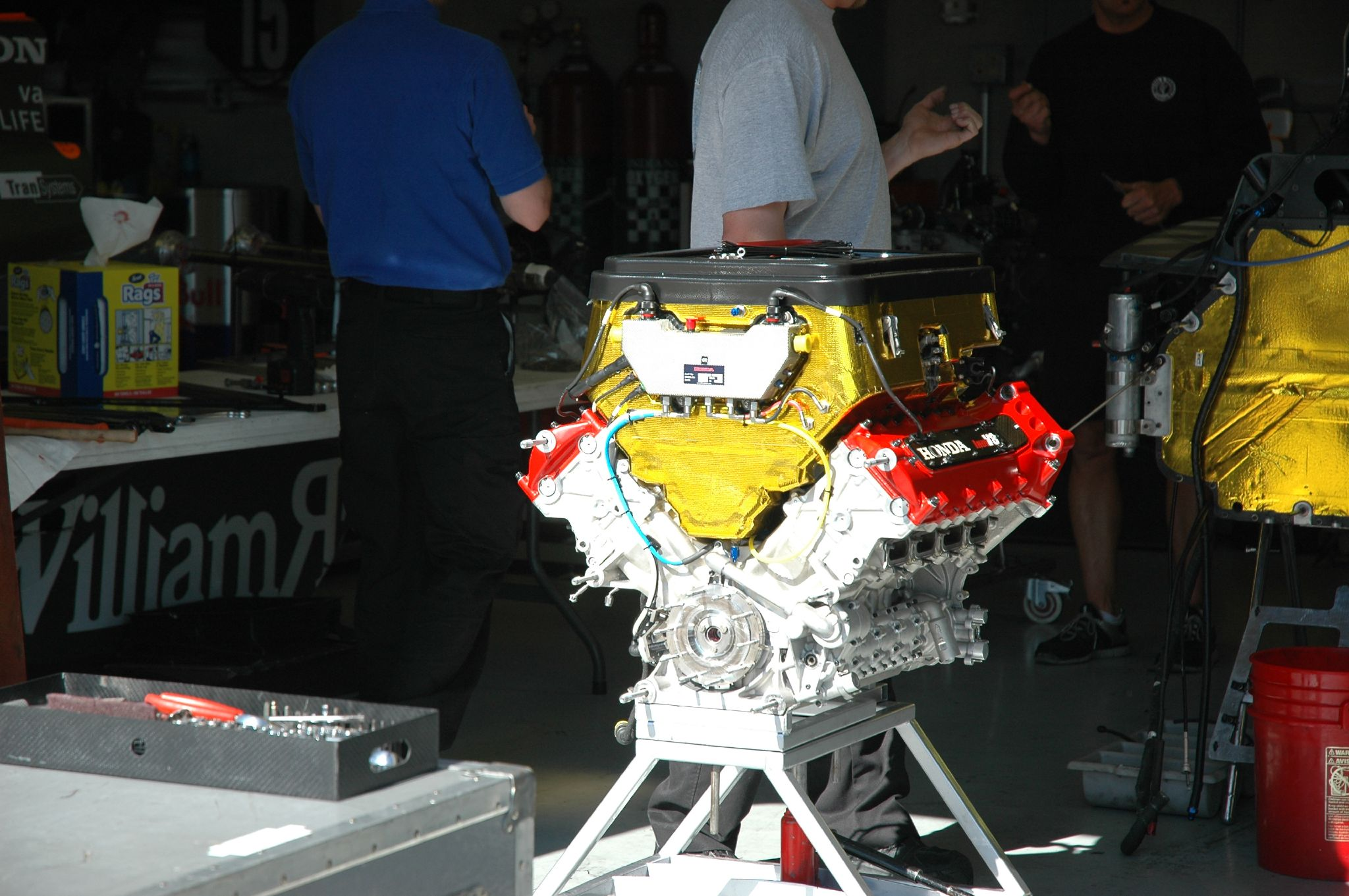
- A 2007-spec Honda Indy HI7R V8 engine.

Overview
- Manufacturer: (United States) / (Japan) Honda Performance Development
- Production: 2003–2011

Layout
- Configuration: V8 naturally-aspirated engine, 90° cylinder angle
- Displacement: 3.5 L (214 cu in) (2003, 2007–2011); 3.0 L (183 cu in) (2004–2006)
- Cylinder bore: 93 mm (3.66 in)
- Piston stroke: 64.4 mm (2.54 in); 55.2 mm (2.17 in)
- Cylinder block material: Aluminum alloy
- Cylinder head material: Aluminum alloy
- Valvetrain: 32-valve (four-valves per cylinder), DOHC

Combustion
- Turbocharger: No
- Fuel system: Electronic indirect multi-point port fuel injection
- Management: Motorola (2003–2010); McLaren (2011)
- Fuel type: 100% fuel grade Ethanol provided by Sunoco
- Oil system: Dry sump
- Cooling system: Single water pump

Output
- Power output: 670 hp (500 kW) (2003–2006); 650 hp (485 kW) (2007-mid 2009); 650 + 20 hp (485 + 15 kW) with push-to-pass (mid 2009-end 2009); 650 + 40 hp (485 + 30 kW) with push-to-pass (2010–2011)
- Torque output: Approx. 434–488 N⋅m (320–360 ft⋅lbf) @ 10,300 rpm

Dimensions
- Dry weight: 280 lb (127 kg) excluding headers, clutch, ECU, spark box or filters

Chronology
- Predecessor: Honda Turbo Indy V8 (1986–2002)
- Successor: Honda Indy V6 (2012–present)

The Honda Indy V8 is a 3-litre and 3.5-litre, naturally-aspirated V8 racing engine, developed and produced by Honda Performance Development in partnership with Ilmor Engineering for the IndyCar Series. The V8 was a highly successful IndyCar Series engine from the 2003 to 2011 season (and the sole engine used in the series from 2006 to 2011) before it was replaced by Honda Indy V6 for the following season. Honda Indy V8 was unveiled at the 2002 Detroit Auto Show and assembled at HPD power assembly plant in Santa Clarita, California, USA and Ilmor Engineering Inc. in Plymouth, Michigan, USA.

== 1st generation (2003–2004) ==
Honda debuted IndyCar Series as engine supplier in 2003 season after a CART successful era. Developed by Honda Performance Development (HPD) with technical support from Ilmor and designated as HI3R, engine's capacity was 3.5-liter. HPD and Ilmor provide trackside support and engine rebuilding services to teams. Honda supplied Andretti Green Racing, Team Rahal, Fernández Racing and Access Motorsports teams. Honda's 2003 stats were 3 pole positions, 6 fastest laps and 2 wins. A revised engine named HI4R was used in 2004 until new regulations came into effect at the 2004 Indianapolis 500.

== 2nd generation (2004–2006) ==
Honda designed a new engine to address the 2004 IRL rule change which required reduced displacement. Developed once again by Ilmor and designated as HI4R-A, its capacity was 3.0-liter and debuted at the 2004 Indianapolis 500. With subsequent evolutions named HI5R and HI6R, Honda was clearly dominant engine, scoring 33 poles, 35 fastest laps, 41 wins totally in three seasons including 3 Indianapolis 500s. Since Chevrolet and Toyota left IndyCar Series after 2005 season, Honda won exclusive tender IndyCar Series engine supplier for 2006 to 2011 seasons.

== 3rd generation (2007–2011) ==
This family was designed as a replacement for the HI6R but enlarged to better accommodate variable valve timing and Active Fuel Management while still generating good performance. HI7R-HI11R's capacity reverted to 3.5-liters respectively since 2007 season. HI7R-HI11R engine was developed and assembled by Honda in Santa Clarita, California, USA (Honda Performance Development's current headquarters) but remained under support from Ilmor Engineering for partial design R&D, trackside support, engine arrangement, tune-up and engine maintenance. HI7R-HI11R engine supplied for all IndyCar Series teams. HI7R-HI11R was a highly successful engine as it was the only one in competition with 86 pole positions, fastest laps, and wins respectively including 2008 Nikon Indy 300 exhibition race and 5 Indianapolis 500s. Due to the IndyCar Series chassis and engine development freeze beginning in 2008, IndyCar Series kept the Honda Indy V8 3rd generation model until 2011 season for cost reasons. The combustion of the Honda Indy V8 was a four-stroke piston Otto cycle.

== Honors ==
On 10 February 2012, Honda Indy V8 was honored as "North American Race Engine of the Year" by Race Engine Magazine.
