= IROC XXV =

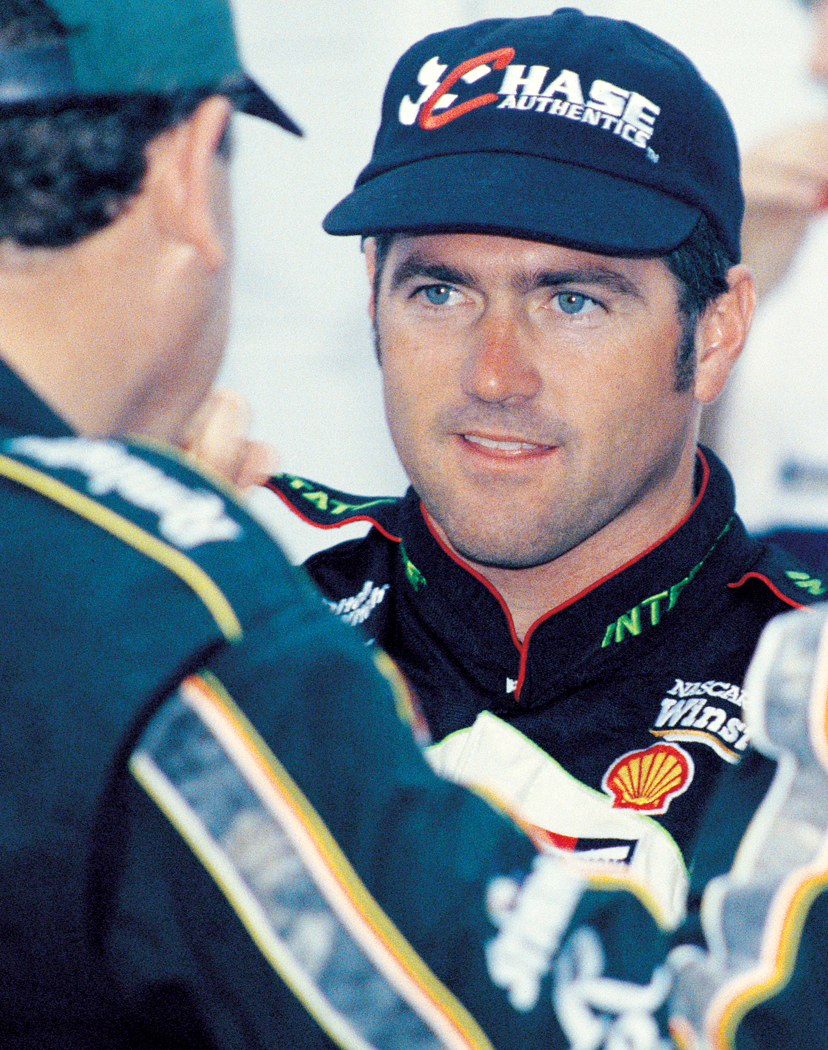
Bobby Labonte (seen in 1998), the IROC XXV champion

XXV was the 25th season of the True Value International Race of Champions, which began on Friday, February 16, 2001 at Daytona International Speedway. The initial roster included 12 drivers from four separate Racing Leagues. After the first race, the series continued with only eleven drivers as a result of the death of Dale Earnhardt in the Daytona 500. Bobby Labonte won the championship.

The roster of drivers and final points standings were as follows:

| Position | Driver | Points | Series |
|---|---|---|---|
| 1 | (United States) Bobby Labonte | 68 | NASCAR Winston Cup |
| 2 | (United States) Tony Stewart | 58 | NASCAR Winston Cup |
| 3 | (Sweden) Kenny Bräck | 57 | CART |
| 4 | (United States) Eddie Cheever | 47 | Indy Racing League |
| 5 | (United States) Dale Jarrett | 47 | NASCAR Winston Cup |
| 6 | (United States) Ricky Rudd | 45 | NASCAR Winston Cup |
| 7 | (Canada) Scott Goodyear | 42 | Indy Racing League |
| 8 | (United States) Jeff Burton | 32 | NASCAR Winston Cup |
| 9 | (United States) Buddy Lazier | 31 | Indy Racing League |
| 10 | (United States) Jeff Green | 28 | NASCAR Busch Series |
| 11 | (United States) Mark Dismore | 25 | Indy Racing League |
| 12 | (United States) Dale Earnhardt | 13* | NASCAR Winston Cup |

* – Only raced in first race of season; this figure is unofficial.

== Race One (Daytona International Speedway) ==
1. Dale Jarrett
2. Ricky Rudd
3. Eddie Cheever
4. Kenny Bräck
5. Bobby Labonte
6. Scott Goodyear
7. Dale Earnhardt
8. Mark Dismore
9. Tony Stewart
10. Jeff Burton
11. Buddy Lazier
12. Jeff Green

== Race Two (Talladega Superspeedway) ==
1. Bobby Labonte
2. Kenny Bräck
3. Buddy Lazier
4. Ricky Rudd
5. Eddie Cheever
6. Jeff Burton
7. Mark Dismore
8. Jeff Green
9. Scott Goodyear
10. Tony Stewart
11. Dale Jarrett

== Race Three (Michigan International Speedway) ==
1. Tony Stewart
2. Al Unser Jr./Scott Goodyear
3. Kenny Bräck
4. Eddie Cheever
5. Bobby Labonte
6. Buddy Lazier
7. Jeff Burton
8. Dale Jarrett
9. Jeff Green
10. Ricky Rudd
11. Mark Dismore

== Race Four (Indianapolis Motor Speedway) ==
1. Bobby Labonte
2. Tony Stewart
3. Kenny Bräck
4. Dale Jarrett
5. Al Unser Jr./Scott Goodyear
6. Ricky Rudd
7. Eddie Cheever
8. Jeff Green
9. Mark Dismore
10. Jeff Burton
11. Buddy Lazier
