= Jeff Green (racing driver) =

American racing driver and crew chief (born 1962)

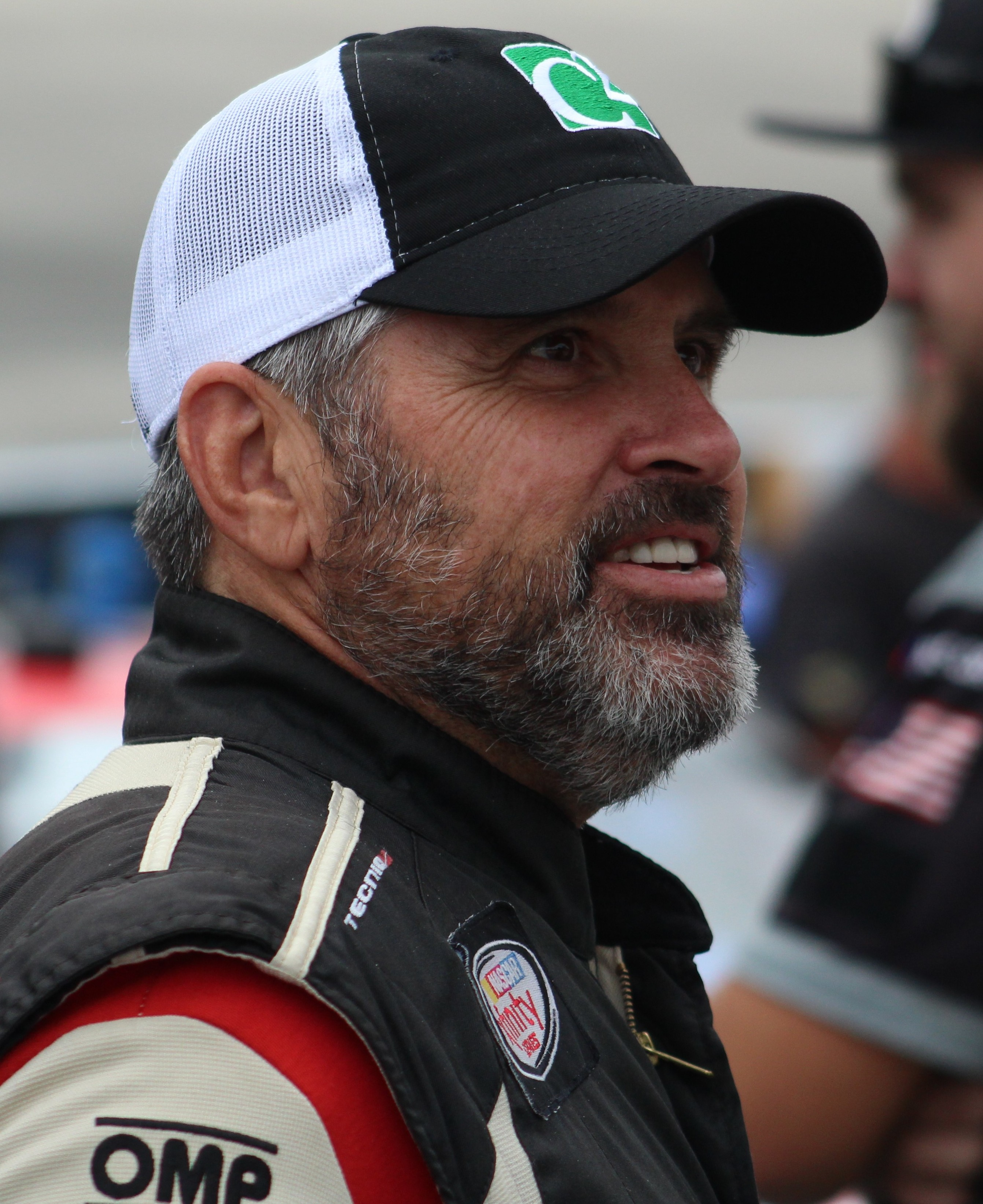
- Green at Dover International Speedway in 2018
- Born: Jeffrey Lynn Green; September 6, 1962 (age 64); Owensboro, Kentucky, U.S.
- Height: 5 ft 8 in (1.73 m)
- Weight: 190 lb (86 kg)
- Achievements: 2000 NASCAR Busch Series Champion; 1990 Nashville Speedway USA Track Champion; 2003 Daytona 500 pole winner

NASCAR Cup Series career
- 270 races run over 15 years
- 2015 position: 74th
- Best finish: 17th (2002)
- First race: 1994 Miller Genuine Draft 400 (Richmond)
- Last race: 2015 Toyota Owners 400 (Richmond)
Wins	Top tens	Poles
0	16	2

NASCAR O'Reilly Auto Parts Series career
- 535 races run over 30 years
- 2020 position: 54th
- Best finish: 1st (2000)
- First race: 1990 Autolite 200 (Richmond)
- Last race: 2020 Pocono Green 225 (Pocono)
- First win: 1997 Las Vegas 300 (Las Vegas)
- Last win: 2002 Carquest Auto Parts 300 (Charlotte)
Wins	Top tens	Poles
16	131	23

NASCAR FedEx Freight Truck Series career
- 10 races run over 3 years
- 2012 position: 104th
- Best finish: 33rd (2008)
- First race: 1997 Virginia Is For Lovers 200 (Richmond)
- Last race: 2012 American Ethanol 225 (Chicago)
Wins	Top tens	Poles
0	1	0
- Statistics up to date as of January 29, 2021.

Jeffrey Lynn Green (born September 6, 1962) is an American former professional stock car racing driver and crew chief. He most recently worked for RSS Racing as the crew chief for their No. 28 car in the ARCA Menards Series, driven by Kyle Sieg, and also competed part-time in the NASCAR Xfinity Series as a start and park driver for the team.

Green's 1990 Nashville Speedway USA championship led to his first foray in NASCAR. For several years, he raced part time in the Busch Series before thriving as a full-time driver in 1995 and 1996. He then went through a two-year Cup stint with Diamond Ridge Motorsports and Felix Sabates.

Green returned to the Busch Series in 1999 for three seasons. He won the 2000 championship by 616 points, a series record which stood until 2006, and finished second in points twice. Green participated in IROC's 25th season in 2001 and has raced full time with four different Sprint Cup teams since 2002.

== Personal and early life ==
Green was born in Owensboro, Kentucky on September 6, 1962, as the youngest of three brothers; Mark and David Green would also become NASCAR drivers. His son Tyler Green is currently working as spotter Carson Hocevar in the cup series. He currently resides in Davidson, North Carolina with his wife Michelle. In 2002, he and Mark founded The Green Foundation, a nonprofit charity assisting people with severe injuries and life-threatening illnesses.

== Racing career ==
=== Early years ===
Green dominated the field to win the 1990 track championship at Nashville Speedway USA. In 22 races, he won fifteen times and had only one finish below 3rd. After the season, John Boatman approached Green about competing in the Autolite Platinum 200, a NASCAR Busch Series event taking place at Richmond International Raceway. Green would start 23rd and finish 22nd in the event, exceeding the team's goal of simply qualifying for the race.

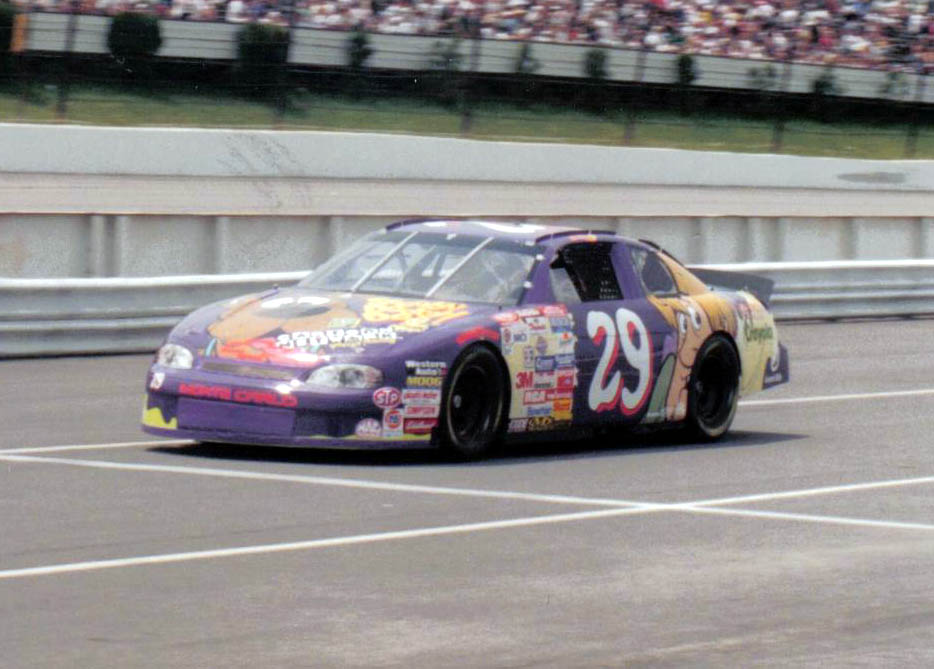
Green in the No. 29 car in 1997

Green ran a limited schedule from 1991 to 1994, sporadically appearing in Busch Series races and making Cup starts for Sadler Brothers and Junior Johnson in 1994. He became a full-time driver in the Busch Series in 1995 for Dale Earnhardt, Inc., and after consecutive top-five finishes in the points standings, he made a pair of Cup races for DEI in 1996. At the end of the season, he signed to drive the unsponsored No. 8 Chevy for Diamond Ridge Motorsports, and won his first career race at Las Vegas. He later made twenty Winston Cup series starts in 1997 for the No. 29 Cartoon Network Chevrolet Monte Carlo, owned by Diamond Ridge, finishing just behind his brother David for Rookie of the Year honors. Green planned to race full time for the team in 1998, but only raced in the No. 29 for three of the first six races. He was later released by Diamond Ridge, who suspended operations for the Winston Cup team in an effort to focus on the Busch Series. Green substituted a race for Derrike Cope, and later signed a contract to drive the No. 46 First Union/The Money Store Chevrolet, owned by Felix Sabates, for the rest of the year. Overall, he would race in 22 of 33 season events and finished 40th in points.

=== Busch Series ===
Green turned his focus back to the Busch Series afterwards, finishing in the Top 2 in points for the next three years. Despite failing to qualify at Rockingham, Green would win three races and finished 2nd in the standings, 280 points behind Dale Earnhardt Jr., in 1999 driving the No. 32 Kleenex Chevy for Progressive Motorsports. It was his first full-time Busch series season since 1996.

As his team became the No. 10 Nesquick/Nestlé Chevy and was rebranded ppc Racing in 2000, Green became the heavy favorite to win the championship after Earnhardt and Matt Kenseth departed for the Winston Cup. After dueling with Todd Bodine for the points lead early in the season, Green pulled away with fourteen consecutive Top 10 finishes, a streak which included five wins. At the end of the year, Green had won the Busch Series championship by 616 points over ppc Racing teammate Jason Keller. This final victory margin was the largest in series history until 2006. Green set a series record for most top-fives in a season (25), and with David Green, the 1994 Busch Series champion, became the first brothers to both win NASCAR championships.

After the 2000 season, Green was again a championship favorite in the 2001 season after switching to Ford. He eventually caught up to Harvick and, with a win in the Carquest Auto Parts 300, Green took a fourteen-point lead over Harvick fourteen races into the season. However, he would suffer a 29th and two 31st-place finishes in the next four races, crippling his chances in the points race as he fell to 4th-place, 302 points behind Harvick. Green finished 124 points behind Harvick and earned his second runner-up finish in three seasons. He had seven finishes outside the Top 20 compared to only two the previous season. In all, during his three-year full-time return to the Busch Series, Green had thirteen wins and 72 Top 10's — both the most of any driver during that period — and averaged three Top 10's in every four races. Later that season Green began driving for Richard Childress Racing part time in the No. 30 America Online Chevrolet in Winston Cup (oddly enough as a replacement for Harvick, who was supposed to drive this car before the death of Dale Earnhardt caused him to be promoted to Childress' Winston Cup team much earlier than planned). Green competed in eight races, winning one pole and scoring one Top 10 finish. After the season, he left the Busch Series to drive for Childress full time.

=== Cup Series ===
In Green's first full Winston Cup season in 2002, he picked up four Top 5 finishes and six Top 10 tens to finish 17th in points. One of these finishes which was his best career finish in the New England 300, finishing 2nd to race winner Ward Burton. The 2nd-place finish brought him up to 18th in the points standings, and Green stayed in the Top 20 for the rest of the year.

Green began 2003 by winning the pole for the Daytona 500 and had a 7th-place finish at Texas Motor Speedway, but otherwise failed to finish higher than 20th and crashed twice. After an incident with teammate Harvick at Richmond, Richard Childress Racing fired Green on May 5. Two days later, he was picked up by DEI to drive the No. 1 Pennzoil Chevrolet, replacing Steve Park, who was hired by Childress to drive the No. 30. Green fared no better than 16th in twelve races and was replaced by John Andretti. He was also replaced in the road-course races by Ron Fellows. In reaction, Green said he was not given the opportunity to improve the situation. After missing three races, Green drove the No. 43 Cheerios/Betty Crocker Dodge Intrepid for Petty Enterprises in the Dover 400 after the original driver, Christian Fittipaldi, had a commitment to drive the No. 44 in four races. After driving the Dodge again in the EA Sports 500 the next week, he became the driver for the rest of the season on a race-to-race basis. Green's best finish with the team was 16th at Dover International Speedway; team owner Richard Petty expressed anticipation that the team could work well together after a few months. Green finished 34th in the points standings, and was signed to drive full time for the team for the next season.

Green had four Top 15 finishes in 2004, including a 7th-place finish in the Subway 500. He would also fail to finish in eleven races, the most DNF's in one season of his Cup career. Five were caused by engine failures while the other six were caused by crashes. The eventual 30th-place finish in the standings remains the lowest result for Green in a full-time season. He would continue to struggle in 2005. He failed to finish in the Top 10 the entire year, with his best finish being 11th in the Coca-Cola 600. Green's 29th-place points finish led to Petty Enterprises announcing on November 11, 2005, that Bobby Labonte would replace him following the season's end.

Green signed with Haas CNC Racing and replaced Mike Bliss in the No. 66 Best Buy Chevrolet, which had been changed from No. 0 to celebrate the sponsor's 40th anniversary. His new crew chief was Robert "Bootie" Barker, who had been subject to rumors of replacement before the 2006 season. In the Daytona 500, Green crashed midway through the race when Dale Jarrett clipped the right-rear of his car; Green would call this "stupid" and a "rookie" move. He rebounded from the 42nd-place finish in the next nine races, finishing no lower than 26th and rising to 21st in points. After finishing four laps down at Darlington, he recovered from a pit zone infraction penalty at Lowe's Motor Speedway and finished 12th. Green's best race came at the UAW Ford 500 at Talladega Superspeedway, in which he finished 7th after starting 35th, breaking a seventy-race streak without a Top 10 finish. After another Top 10 finish at Martinsville Speedway, he ended the season 28th in the final points standings.

=== Part-time in multiple series ===
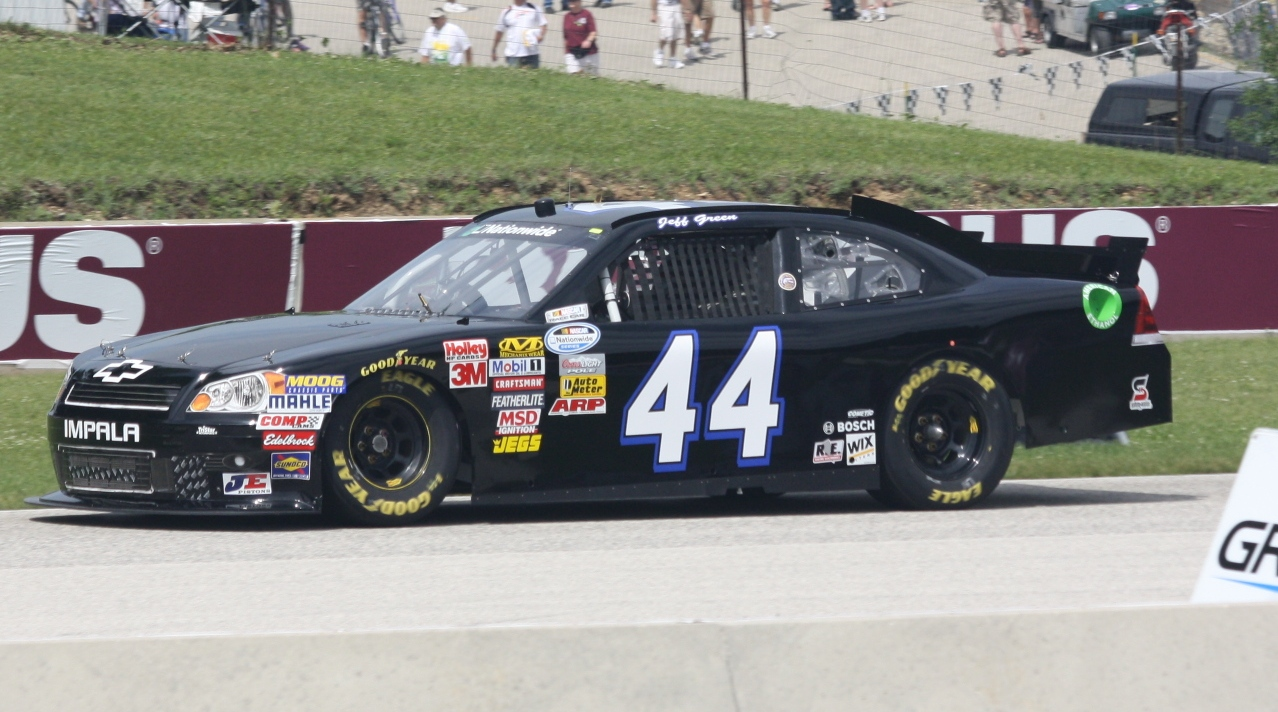
Green in 2011

Green returned to Haas in 2007, and had three 6th-place finishes but was released with four races to go in the season. In 2008, he attempted four Cup races with Wood Brothers Racing and Front Row Motorsports respectively, but did not qualify for any of those races. He did qualify for three races in the Nationwide Series in the No. 31 Key Motorsports Chevy with a best finish of 28th, and ran eight races with their No. 40 truck team. His best finish was 7th at Las Vegas.

In 2009, Green continued his part-time schedule in the Nationwide Series, running for Day Enterprise Racing, MSRP Motorsports, MacDonald Motorsports, and Key Motorsports. His best finish was 21st at Nashville Superspeedway.

Green continued in 2010, driving at Daytona for Day Enterprise Racing. As with the year prior, he drove for various teams, including Front Row Motorsports. TriStar Motorsports picked him up to start and park their No. 36 entry, a team that he would stick with for multiple years. He later ran a handful of Cup Series races for Latitude 43 Motorsports and Gunselman Motorsports with a best finish of 24th.

Green exclusively started and parked for TriStar Motorsports in 2011. In his lone Sprint Cup Start of the season, he finished 43rd in the debut of the Front Row Motorsports No. 55 at New Hampshire International Speedway.

Green began the 2012 Nationwide Series year by start and parking in the new No. 10 for TriStar, but after an injury to Eric McClure after the 2012 Talladega race, Green was named interim driver of the No. 14. Green finished 19th in his first relief start at Darlington, but finished 32nd at Iowa and Charlotte due to a crash and an engine failure, respectively. In his fourth relief start, Green posted his best finish of the year, seventeenth, at Dover International Speedway In his final relief start, Green finished on the lead lap in 18th at Michigan International Speedway. With the return of McClure at Road America, Green returned to start and park duties. Green attempted one Sprint Cup Series race in 2012, but failed to qualify at Kansas Speedway driving for Joe Falk's No. 33.

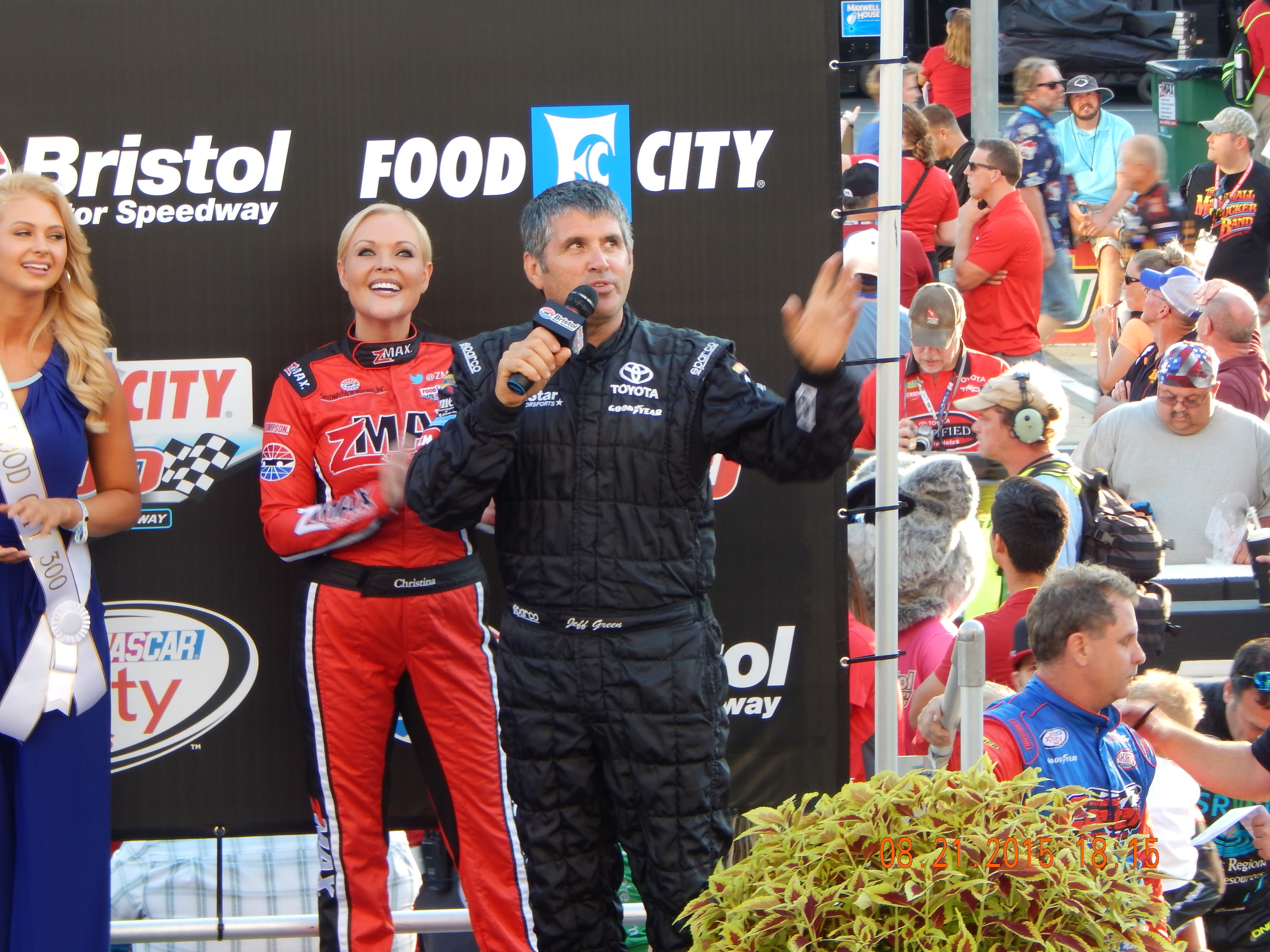
Green at Bristol Motor Speedway in 2015

In 2013, Green returned to the start-and-park No. 10 Toyota for Tri-Star Motorsports, though he replaced McClure in the No. 14 for four races. Unlike the No. 10, Green ran full races in the No. 14. In 2014 at Mid-Ohio, Green was battling for the lead with eventual race winner Chris Buescher but a mechanical failure ruined his best chance at his first Nationwide Series win since 2002. He would finish 29th. In 2015, Green attempted a few cup series races in the No. 30 car for The Motorsports Group, replacing the fired Ron Hornaday Jr. In his first start at Richmond, Green qualified 33rd and finished 40th - the team's best finish that year. He failed to qualify in his next two attempts. These would end up being the final three attempts of his Cup series career.

Green continued racing in the Xfinity series in 2016, joining Rick Ware Racing to race the season opener at Daytona. Engine issues caused him to finish 36th. He returned to RWR at the 2016 Subway Firecracker 250 where he finished 7th, his first Top 10 in eleven years. He ran in the Top 15 most of the race and avoided many wrecks, including a wreck on the last lap where he spun polesitter David Ragan.

Following several consecutive seasons of start and parking for TriStar motorsports, he switched teams in 2017 by driving full-time for B. J. McLeod Motorsports after having made a few starts for them the year prior. Despite these plans, he was swapped out on race 4 of the season at Phoenix and only made select starts for the team the rest of the year. In the weeks where he wasn't driving for BJMM, he did start and park races for RSS Racing.

Green competed in the full 2018 season with RSS, mostly start and parking in the No. 93. The only two races he ran to completion were at Daytona and Talladega. The following year, Green competed in the first half of the 2019 NASCAR Xfinity Series season before missing the rest starting in July as he underwent rotator cuff surgery. He served as a crew chief for RSS Racing for the remainder of the year. His final Xfinity series start came at Pocono Raceway in 2020, where he DNFed after 17 laps.

For 2021, Green revealed his plans for the year in a response to a fan's question on Twitter, who asked him if he had plans to compete in any Xfinity races for RSS. Green stated that he did not have any races scheduled for the season. He would continue as a crew chief with RSS, moving from the Xfinity Series to their part-time ARCA Menards Series car, the No. 28, driven by Ryan's younger brother Kyle Sieg. On May 21, Green announced that he would be retiring from driving and crew chiefing NASCAR effective immediately. He made his announcement after the conclusion of Sieg's part-time ARCA schedule, which was the first 4 races of the season. Green's final race ended up being as crew chief for Kyle Sieg in his Xfinity Series debut at Dover.

=== Conflicts with fellow drivers ===
During the 1998 NASCAR Winston Cup Series in the 1998 Pontiac Excitement 400 at Richmond International Raceway, Green was involved in an early crash with Ted Musgrave, rendering him out of the race. Green climbed from his car during the caution period and stood on the track and angrily pointed at Musgrave as he passing by. Green then ran to the pit area to confront Musgrave's crew before being restrained by a NASCAR official. His team owner, Felix Sabates, then went to confront the crew and radioed his other two drivers, Sterling Marlin and Joe Nemechek, to try and wreck Musgrave at every opportunity for the remainder of the race.

While in the Busch Series, Green developed a rivalry with Kevin Harvick. The drivers were prime contenders for the 2000 and 2001 championships, with Harvick beating Green out in the latter year. Green would become a teammate of Harvick's in the Winston Cup in 2002; both rejected the notion that they could not get along. While their first season together passed without incident, the second did not end well. During the 2003 Pontiac Excitement 400, Harvick ran into the rear of Green's car while Green was attempting to avoid a conflict between Ryan Newman and Ward Burton. Harvick began apologizing for the spin-out, and cameras showed that Green's car had hesitated before the collision. Green was outraged by the incident and confronted Harvick's crew chief, Todd Berrier, later saying, "Tough to be teammates when it seems like there's only one car at RCR." He was fired by Childress the next day, who said that change was needed after the relationship had gone awry.

After a relatively quiet 2004, Green took part in a much-publicized feud with his former high school schoolmate and off-track friend, Michael Waltrip during the early 2005 season, especially during races at Martinsville and Darlington, where Green and Waltrip wrecked each other on several occasions. While no penalties were assessed against the drivers, NASCAR ordered them to discontinue the incidents.

During the 2006 season, at the Chevy Rock and Roll 400, after being involved in a crash with Jimmie Johnson on lap 252, Green drove back onto the track, and, while 51 laps down while repairs were made, then slammed into Johnson just after he had spun off the bumper of Reed Sorenson on lap 322, resulting in his car being ordered to the garage for the final 78 laps (resulting in a 41st-place finish).

== Motorsports career results ==
=== NASCAR ===
(key) (Bold – Pole position awarded by qualifying time. Italics – Pole position earned by points standings or practice time. * – Most laps led.)

==== Sprint Cup Series ====
NASCAR Sprint Cup Series results
Year	Team	No.	Make	1	2	3	4	5	6	7	8	9	10	11	12	13	14	15	16	17	18	19	20	21	22	23	24	25	26	27	28	29	30	31	32	33	34	35	36	NSCC	Pts	Ref
1991	Pinnacle Racing	86	Chevy	DAY	RCH	CAR	ATL	DAR	BRI	NWS	MAR	TAL	CLT; DNQ	DOV	SON	POC	MCH	DAY	POC	TAL	GLN	MCH	BRI	DAR	RCH	DOV	MAR	NWS	CLT	CAR	PHO	ATL								NA	-	
1994	Sadler Brothers Racing	95	Ford	DAY	CAR	RCH	ATL	DAR	BRI	NWS	MAR	TAL	SON	CLT	DOV	POC	MCH	DAY	NHA	POC	TAL	IND	GLN	MCH	BRI; DNQ	DAR	RCH; 36	DOV	MAR	NWS; 29	CLT	CAR	PHO							51st	240	
1994	Junior Johnson & Associates	97	Ford																															ATL; 18						51st	240	
1996	Dale Earnhardt, Inc.	14	Chevy	DAY	CAR	RCH	ATL	DAR	BRI	NWS	MAR	TAL	SON	CLT	DOV	POC; 36	MCH	DAY	NHA	POC; 41	TAL	IND	GLN	MCH	BRI	DAR	RCH	DOV	MAR											49th	247	
1996	Diamond Ridge Motorsports	29	Chevy																											NWS; 32	CLT; 26	CAR	PHO	ATL						49th	247	
1997	Diamond Ridge Motorsports	29	Chevy	DAY	CAR	RCH	ATL	DAR	TEX	BRI	MAR	SON	TAL	CLT; 22	DOV; 37	POC; 35	MCH; 31	CAL; 7	DAY; DNQ	NHA; 32	POC; 31	IND; 25	GLN; 30	MCH; 18	BRI; 21	DAR; 39	RCH; 31	NHA; 38	DOV; 40	MAR; 30	CLT; 29	TAL; DNQ	CAR; 21	PHO; 32	ATL; 4					39th	1624	
1998	Diamond Ridge Motorsports	29	Chevy	DAY; DNQ	CAR; 22	LVS; 33	ATL; DNQ	DAR; 32	BRI; DNQ	TEX		TAL; DNQ	CAL	CLT	DOV																									40th	1687	
1998	Bahari Racing	30	Pontiac								MAR; 17																													40th	1687	
1998	Team SABCO	46	Chevy													RCH; 42	MCH; 30	POC; 33	SON	NHA; 12	POC; 24	IND; 30	GLN	MCH; 41	BRI; 17	NHA; 38	DAR; 16	RCH; 20	DOV; 34	MAR; 31	CLT; DNQ	TAL; 33	DAY; 37	PHO; 28	CAR; 27	ATL; 36				40th	1687	
1999	Bud Moore Engineering	15	Ford	DAY; DNQ	CAR	LVS	ATL	DAR	TEX	BRI	MAR	TAL	CAL	RCH																										60th	100	
1999	Team SABCO	01	Chevy												CLT; DNQ	DOV	MCH	POC; 21	SON	DAY	NHA	POC	IND; QL^{†}	GLN	MCH	BRI	DAR	RCH	NHA	DOV	MAR	CLT	TAL	CAR	PHO	HOM	ATL			60th	100	
2001	Richard Childress Racing	30	Chevy	DAY	CAR	LVS	ATL	DAR	BRI	TEX	MAR	TAL	CAL; 21	RCH	CLT	DOV; DNQ	MCH; 17	POC	SON	DAY	CHI; 36	NHA	POC	IND; 21	GLN	MCH	**BRI**; 42	DAR	RCH; 40	DOV	KAN	CLT; DNQ	MAR	TAL	PHO	CAR		ATL; 34	NHA	48th	539	
2001	Richard Childress Racing	31	Chevy																																		HOM; 9			48th	539	
2002	Richard Childress Racing	30	Chevy	DAY; 19	CAR; 17	LVS; 33	ATL; 41	DAR; 25	BRI; 27	TEX; 16	MAR; 22	TAL; 16	CAL; 11	RCH; 13	CLT; 20	DOV; 38	POC; 34	MCH; 18	SON; 5	DAY; 21	CHI; 12	NHA; 2	POC; 26	IND; 19	GLN; 12	MCH; 9	BRI; 35	DAR; 12	RCH; 3	NHA; 26	DOV; 13	KAN; 17	TAL; 5	CLT; 29	MAR; 32	ATL; 24	CAR; 10	PHO; 35	HOM; 38	17th	3704	
2003	Richard Childress Racing	30	Chevy	**DAY**; 39	CAR; 31	LVS; 27	ATL; 25	DAR; 19	BRI; 20	TEX; 7	TAL; 29	MAR; 26	CAL; 26	RCH; 40																										34th	2656	
2003	Dale Earnhardt, Inc.	1	Chevy												CLT; 19	DOV; 25	POC; 33	MCH; 28	SON	DAY; 29	CHI; 16	NHA; 30	POC; 31	IND; 20	GLN	MCH; 21	BRI; 40	DAR; 18	RCH	NHA										34th	2656	
2003	Petty Enterprises	43	Dodge																												DOV; 16	TAL; 18	KAN; 27	CLT; 27	MAR; 24	ATL; DNQ	PHO; 37	CAR; 19	HOM; 40	34th	2656	
2004	Petty Enterprises	43	Dodge	DAY; 33	CAR; 28	LVS; 34	ATL; 19	DAR; 24	BRI; 29	TEX; 35	MAR; 24	TAL; 19	CAL; 37	RCH; 37	CLT; 27	DOV; 31	POC; 15	MCH; 27	SON; 27	DAY; 30	CHI; 28	NHA; 24	POC; 33	IND; 14	GLN; 17	MCH; 23	BRI; 29	CAL; 27	RCH; 25	NHA; 19	DOV; 21	TAL; 39	KAN; 29	CLT; 35	MAR; 7	ATL; 21	PHO; 23	DAR; 14	HOM; 37	30th	3054	
2005	Petty Enterprises	43	Dodge	DAY; 16	CAL; 27	LVS; 23	ATL; 28	BRI; 29	MAR; 22	TEX; 43	PHO; 21	TAL; 25	DAR; 22	RCH; 24	CLT; 11	DOV; 30	POC; 15	MCH; 38	SON; 29	DAY; 34	CHI; 24	NHA; 31	POC; 19	IND; 15	GLN; 24	MCH; 24	BRI; 22	CAL; 25	RCH; 16	NHA; 17	DOV; 27	TAL; 21	KAN; 26	CLT; 19	MAR; 37	ATL; 29	TEX; 18	PHO; 28	HOM; 30	29th	3241	
2006	Haas CNC Racing	66	Chevy	DAY; 42	CAL; 24	LVS; 18	ATL; 26	BRI; 15	MAR; 25	TEX; 18	PHO; 18	TAL; 14	RCH; 18	DAR; 32	CLT; 12	DOV; 28	POC; 37	MCH; 33	SON; 19	DAY; 26	CHI; 27	NHA; 26	POC; 35	IND; 38	GLN; 15	MCH; 27	BRI; 24	CAL; 22	RCH; 41	NHA; 43	DOV; 20	KAN; 30	TAL; 7	CLT; 16	MAR; 8	ATL; 23	TEX; 13	PHO; 37	HOM; 22	28th	3253	
2007	Haas CNC Racing	66	Chevy	DAY; 36	CAL; 30	LVS; 25	ATL; 35	BRI; 6	MAR; 36	TEX; 26	PHO; 6	TAL; 13	RCH; 24	DAR; 22	CLT; 42	DOV; 30	POC; 32	MCH; 36	SON; 42	NHA; 6	DAY; 37	CHI; 27	IND; 43	POC; 19	GLN; 20	MCH; 22	BRI; 27	CAL; 23	RCH; 33	NHA; 27	DOV; 31	KAN; 20	TAL; 13	CLT; 32	MAR; 28	ATL	TEX	PHO	HOM	32nd	2704	
2008	Wood Brothers Racing	21	Ford	DAY	CAL	LVS	ATL	BRI; DNQ	MAR	TEX	PHO	TAL	RCH																											NA	-	
2008	Front Row Motorsports	34	Chevy											DAR; DNQ	CLT; DNQ	DOV	POC	MCH	SON	NHA	DAY	CHI	IND	POC	GLN	MCH	BRI; DNQ	CAL	RCH	NHA	DOV	KAN	TAL	CLT	MAR	ATL	TEX	PHO	HOM	NA	-	
2010	Latitude 43 Motorsports	26	Ford	DAY	CAL	LVS	ATL	BRI	MAR	PHO	TEX	TAL	RCH	DAR	DOV	CLT	POC	MCH	SON	NHA	DAY	CHI	IND	POC	GLN	MCH	BRI; 24	ATL	RCH; 36	NHA; DNQ	DOV; DNQ	KAN	CAL							57th	186	
2010	Gunselman Motorsports	64	Toyota																															CLT; 41	MAR	TAL	TEX; DNQ	PHO	HOM	57th	186	
2011	Front Row Motorsports	55	Ford	DAY	PHO	LVS	BRI	CAL	MAR	TEX	TAL	RCH	DAR	DOV	CLT	KAN	POC	MCH	SON	DAY	KEN	NHA; 43	IND	POC	GLN	MCH														81st	0^{1}	
2011	Max Q Motorsports	37	Ford																								BRI; DNQ	ATL	RCH	CHI	NHA	DOV	KAN	CLT	TAL	MAR	TEX	PHO	HOM	81st	0^{1}	
2012	Circle Sport	33	Chevy	DAY	PHO	LVS	BRI	CAL	MAR	TEX	KAN; DNQ	RCH	TAL	DAR	CLT	DOV	POC	MCH	SON	KEN	DAY	NHA	IND	POC	GLN	MCH	BRI	ATL	RCH	CHI										NA	-	
2012	Humphrey Smith Racing	19	Toyota																												NHA; DNQ	DOV	TAL	CLT	KAN	MAR	TEX	PHO	HOM	NA	-	
2015	The Motorsports Group	30	Chevy	DAY	ATL	LVS	PHO	CAL	MAR	TEX	BRI	RCH; 40	TAL	KAN	CLT; DNQ	DOV; DNQ	POC	MCH	SON	DAY	KEN	NHA	IND	POC	GLN	MCH	BRI	DAR	RCH	CHI	NHA	DOV	CLT	KAN	TAL	MAR	TEX	PHO	HOM	74th	0^{1}	
^{†} – Replaced by Steve Grissom for second round qualifying.

===== Daytona 500 =====
Year	Team	Manufacturer	Start	Finish
1998	Diamond Ridge Motorsports	Chevrolet	DNQ	
1999	Bud Moore Engineering	Ford	DNQ	
2002	Richard Childress Racing	Chevrolet	30	19
2003	Richard Childress Racing	Chevrolet	**1**	39
2004	Petty Enterprises	Dodge	34	33
2005	Petty Enterprises	Dodge	26	16
2006	Haas CNC Racing	Chevrolet	21	42
2007	Haas CNC Racing	Chevrolet	31	36

==== Xfinity Series ====
NASCAR Xfinity Series results
Year	Team	No.	Make	1	2	3	4	5	6	7	8	9	10	11	12	13	14	15	16	17	18	19	20	21	22	23	24	25	26	27	28	29	30	31	32	33	34	35	NXSC	Pts	Ref
1990	Pinnacle Racing	81	Chevy	DAY	RCH	CAR	MAR	HCY	DAR	BRI	LAN	SBO	NZH	HCY	CLT	DOV	ROU	VOL	MYB	OXF	NHA	SBO	DUB	IRP	ROU	BRI	DAR	RCH; 22	DOV	MAR	CLT	NHA	CAR; 38	MAR					89th	97	
1991	Pinnacle Racing	86	Chevy	DAY; DNQ	RCH	CAR; 18	MAR; 21	VOL; 6	HCY; 23	DAR; 12	BRI; 17	LAN; 21	SBO	NZH; 32	CLT	DOV	ROU; 31	HCY; 22	MYB; 30	GLN	OXF	NHA	SBO								CLT; DNQ	NHA	CAR	MAR					29th	1396	
1991	Day Enterprises	52	Chevy																					DUB; 27	IRP; 22	ROU; 15	BRI; DNQ	DAR	RCH	DOV									29th	1396	
1992	Day Enterprises	16	Chevy	DAY; 18	CAR; 31	RCH	ATL; 24	MAR	DAR	BRI; 26	HCY; 30	LAN; 17	DUB; 7	NZH	CLT	DOV	ROU; 26	MYB; 18	GLN	VOL; 15	NHA	TAL	IRP; 20	ROU	MCH; 21	NHA	BRI; 29	DAR	RCH	DOV	CLT; DNQ	MAR	CAR	HCY					30th	1277	
1993	Day Enterprises	16	Chevy	DAY; 43	CAR; 20	RCH; 29	DAR; 40	BRI; 5	HCY; 30	**ROU**; 16	MAR; 27	NZH; 18	CLT	DOV	MYB	GLN	MLW	TAL; 42	IRP; 32	MCH	NHA	BRI	DAR	RCH	DOV	ROU	CLT	MAR	CAR	HCY	ATL								40th	894	
1994	Michael Waltrip Racing	17	Pontiac	DAY	CAR	RCH	ATL	MAR	DAR	HCY	BRI; 3	ROU	NHA	NZH	CLT	DOV	MYB	GLN	MLW	SBO	TAL	HCY																	61st	360	
1994	Whitaker Racing	7	Chevy																				IRP; QL^{†}	MCH	BRI	DAR	RCH												61st	360	
1994	Davison Motorsports	76	Chevy																									DOV; 34	CLT; 10	MAR; DNQ	CAR								61st	360	
1995	Dale Earnhardt, Inc.	3	Chevy	DAY; 7	CAR; 10	RCH; 36	ATL; DNQ	NSV; 10	DAR; 27	BRI; 25	HCY; 29	NHA; 14*	NZH; 4	CLT; 2	DOV; 15	**MYB**; 4	GLN; 5	MLW; 3*	TAL; 12	SBO; 22	IRP; 9	MCH; 14	BRI; 2	DAR; 9	RCH; 15	DOV; 8	CLT; 11	CAR; 27	HOM; 35										5th	3182	
1995	Hank Parker Racing	03	Chevy				ATL; 22																																5th	3182	
1996	Dale Earnhardt, Inc.	3	Chevy	DAY; 25	CAR; 20	RCH; 37	ATL; 32	NSV; 40	**DAR**; 11	BRI; 2	HCY; 7	NZH; 3	CLT; 43	DOV; 7	SBO; 3	MYB; 5	GLN; 6	MLW; 7	NHA; 4	TAL; 14	IRP; 36	MCH; 18	BRI; 8	DAR; 7	RCH; 27	DOV; 29	CLT; 8	CAR; 8	HOM; 13										4th	3059	
1997	Diamond Ridge Motorsports	8	Chevy	DAY; 14	CAR; 34	RCH; 2	ATL; 11	**LVS**; 1*	DAR; 8	HCY; 4	**TEX**; 15	BRI; 12	NSV; 2	TAL; 3	NHA; 13	NZH; 4	CLT; 31	DOV	SBO	GLN	MLW	MYB	GTY	IRP	MCH	BRI	DAR	RCH	DOV	CLT	CAL	CAR	HOM						28th	1898	
1998	Ricky Craven Motorsports	2	Chevy	DAY	CAR	LVS	NSV	DAR	BRI	TEX; 9	HCY	TAL	NHA			DOV; 14																							52nd	668	
1998	Washington-Erving Motorsports	50	Ford											NZH; 13	CLT; 13		RCH; 28	PPR	GLN	MLW	MYB	CAL	SBO	IRP	MCH														52nd	668	
1998	Martin Motorsports	92	Chevy																							BRI; 37	DAR; DNQ	RCH; 18	DOV	CLT; DNQ	GTY	CAR; DNQ	ATL	HOM					52nd	668	
1999	Progressive Motorsports	32	Chevy	DAY; 2	CAR; DNQ	LVS; 8	ATL; 17	DAR; 25	TEX; 3	NSV; 1*	BRI; 23	TAL; 17	CAL; 32	**NHA**; 2*	RCH; 5*	**NZH**; 7*	CLT; 10	DOV; 7	SBO; 2	GLN; 40	MLW; 2	MYB; 1	PPR; 4*	GTY; 4	IRP; 3	MCH; 16	**BRI**; 12	DAR; 17	RCH; 29	DOV; 3	CLT; 15	CAR; 2	**MEM**; 1	PHO; 11	HOM; 5				2nd	4367	
2000	Ppc Racing	10	Chevy	DAY; 42	CAR; 2	LVS; 6	ATL; 13	DAR; 4	**BRI**; 2	TEX; 5	NSV; 12*	TAL; 5	**CAL**; 3	**RCH**; 1	NHA; 2	CLT; 3	DOV; 4	SBO; 1*	**MYB**; 1*	GLN; 10	**MLW**; 1*	**NZH**; 4	PPR; 1*	GTY; 5	IRP; 3*	MCH; 14	BRI; 3	DAR; 4	RCH; 2	DOV; 42	CLT; 4	CAR; 1	**MEM**; 3*	PHO; 4	HOM; 3				1st	5005	
2001	Ppc Racing	10	Ford	DAY; 4	CAR; 8	LVS; 5	ATL; 4	DAR; 1	BRI; 38	TEX; 32	NSH; 8	TAL; 3	CAL; 3	RCH; 6	NHA; 4	NZH; 3	CLT; 1	DOV; 29	KEN; 31	MLW; 9	GLN; 31	CHI; 6	GTY; 5	PPR; 2	IRP; 6	MCH; 36	BRI; 2	DAR; 9	**RCH**; 22	DOV; 1	KAN; 1	CLT; 10	MEM; 2*	PHO; 2	CAR; 9*	**HOM**; 9			2nd	4689	
2002	Richard Childress Racing	21	Chevy	DAY; 25	**CAR**; 11*	LVS; 5	DAR; 3	BRI; 1*	**TEX**; 5	NSH	TAL	CAL; 2	RCH; 39	NHA	NZH	CLT; 1	**DOV**; 2	NSH	KEN	MLW	DAY	CHI; 7	GTY	PPR	IRP	MCH; 3	BRI; 5	DAR; 3	RCH; 12	DOV; 4*	KAN; 7	CLT; 4	MEM	ATL; 17	**CAR**; 6*	PHO; 31	**HOM**; 10		19th	3209	
2003	NEMCO Motorsports	87	Pontiac	DAY; 36	CAR	LVS	DAR	BRI	TEX	TAL	NSH	CAL	RCH	GTY	NZH																								72nd	447	
2003	Team Amick	32	Chevy													CLT; 40	DOV	NSH	KEN	MLW	DAY	CHI	NHA	PPR	IRP	MCH	BRI	DAR	RCH										72nd	447	
2003	Innovative Motorsports	48	Chevy																											DOV; 39		CLT; 24	MEM	ATL	PHO	CAR			72nd	447	
2003	Herzog-Jackson Motorsports	92	Chevy																												KAN; 11						HOM; 27		72nd	447	
2005	Curb Agajanian Performance Group	43	Dodge	DAY	CAL	MXC	LVS	ATL	NSH; 20	BRI; 20	TEX	PHO	TAL																BRI; 18	CAL	RCH	DOV	KAN	CLT	MEM	TEX	PHO	HOM	47th	984	
2005	Biagi Brothers Racing	4	Dodge											DAR; 28	RCH; 6	CLT; 17	DOV; 38	NSH	KEN	MLW	DAY; 15	CHI; 38	NHA; 17	PPR	GTY	IRP	GLN	MCH											47th	984	
2006	McGill Motorsports	36	Chevy	DAY	CAL	MXC	LVS	ATL	BRI	TEX	NSH	PHO	TAL	RCH	DAR	CLT	DOV	NSH	KEN	MLW	DAY	CHI	NHA	MAR	GTY	IRP	GLN	MCH; 22	BRI	CAL	RCH	DOV	KAN	CLT	MEM	TEX	PHO	HOM	114th	97	
2007	Jay Robinson Racing	28	Chevy	DAY	CAL; 19	MXC	LVS; 23	ATL	BRI	NSH	TEX	PHO	TAL	RCH	DAR	CLT	DOV	NSH	KEN	MLW	NHA	DAY	CHI	GTY	IRP	CGV	GLN	MCH; 36	BRI	CAL	RCH	DOV	KAN	CLT	MEM	TEX	PHO	HOM	96th	255	
2008	Key Motorsports	31	Chevy	DAY	CAL	LVS	ATL	BRI	NSH	TEX	PHO	MXC	TAL	RCH; 38	DAR	CLT	DOV	NSH	KEN	MLW	NHA	DAY	CHI	GTY	IRP	CGV	GLN	MCH	BRI; 28	CAL	RCH	DOV	KAN	CLT; 35	MEM	TEX	PHO	HOM	99th	186	
2009	Day Enterprise Racing	05	Chevy	DAY; 27	CAL	LVS	BRI	TEX			TAL; 36	RCH								DAY; 34	CHI																		73rd	483	
2009	MacDonald Motorsports	81	Dodge						NSH; 21	PHO																													73rd	483	
2009	Key Motorsports	40	Chevy										DAR; 23	CLT	DOV	NSH																							73rd	483	
2009	MSRP Motorsports	91	Chevy														KEN; DNQ	MLW	NHA																				73rd	483	
2009	Day Enterprise Racing	85	Ford																			GTY; DNQ																	73rd	483	
2009	Day Enterprise Racing	05	Ford																				IRP; 24	IOW	GLN	MCH	BRI	CGV	ATL	RCH	DOV	KAN	CAL	CLT	MEM	TEX	PHO	HOM	73rd	483	
2010	Day Enterprise Racing	05	Chevy	DAY; 27	CAL	LVS	BRI	NSH	PHO	TEX																													46th	868	
2010	Key Motorsports	40	Chevy								TAL; 16	RCH	DAR	DOV	CLT	NSH; 24	KEN; 20	ROA	NHA	DAY	CHI	GTY													GTY; 25				46th	868	
2010	Front Row Motorsports	36	Chevy																				IRP; 40	IOW; 43	GLN	MCH	BRI; 43												46th	868	
2010	TriStar Motorsports	36	Chevy																									CGV; 42	ATL; 43	RCH	DOV; 43	KAN; 43	CAL; 43	CLT; 42		TEX; DNQ	PHO; 43	HOM; 43	46th	868	
2011	TriStar Motorsports	44	Chevy	DAY; 40	PHO	LVS; 42	BRI; 38	CAL; 37	TEX; 43	TAL; 43	NSH; 42	RCH; 40	DAR; 34	DOV; 41	IOW	CLT; 43	CHI; 40	MCH; 41	ROA; 38	DAY; 43	KEN; 37	NHA	NSH; 35	IRP; 33	IOW; 43	GLN; 43	CGV; 43	BRI; 43	ATL; 37	RCH; 36	CHI	DOV; 43	KAN; 41	CLT; 43	TEX; 42	PHO; 34	HOM; DNQ		38th	118	
2012	TriStar Motorsports	10	Toyota	DAY; 43	PHO; 43	LVS; 40	BRI; 42	CAL; 43	TEX; 43	RCH; 43	TAL; 39						ROA; 43	KEN; 42	DAY; 43	NHA; 43	CHI; 43	IND; 36		GLN; 40	CGV; 43	BRI; 42	ATL; 35	RCH; 43	CHI; 31	KEN			KAN; 42		PHO; 23				26th	256	
2012	TriStar Motorsports	14	Toyota									DAR; 19	IOW; 32	CLT; 32	DOV; 17	MCH; 17																							26th	256	
2012	TriStar Motorsports	91	Toyota																				IOW; 43											TEX; 37		HOM; 40			26th	256	
2012	TriStar Motorsports	44	Toyota																												DOV; 15	CLT; 16							26th	256	
2013	TriStar Motorsports	10	Toyota	DAY; 40	PHO; 37	LVS; 38	BRI; 37	CAL; 37	TEX; 40	RCH; 40	TAL; 40	DAR; 37	CLT; Wth	DOV; 35	IOW; 40	MCH; 36	ROA; 40	KEN; 40		NHA; 40	CHI; 37	IND; 40	IOW; 40	GLN; 37					CHI; 40	KEN; 40	DOV; 35	KAN; 40	CLT; 40		PHO; 40				29th	274	
2013	NEMCO-Jay Robinson Racing	70	Toyota																DAY; 30																				29th	274	
2013	TriStar Motorsports	14	Toyota																						MOH; 24	BRI; 16	ATL; 29	RCH; 22						TEX; 27		HOM; 20			29th	274	
2014	TriStar Motorsports	91	Toyota	DAY; 40	PHO			CAL; 40	TEX	DAR; 39		TAL; 38														BRI; 40							CLT; 35	TEX		HOM; 40			31st	172	
2014	TriStar Motorsports	10	Toyota			LVS; 40	BRI				RCH; 38		IOW; 39	CLT			ROA; 36	KEN; 39	DAY	NHA	CHI	IND	IOW	GLN			ATL; 40			KEN; 40					PHO; 34				31st	172	
2014	TriStar Motorsports	14	Toyota												DOV; 18	MCH; 23									MOH; 29			RCH; 30	CHI		DOV; 26	KAN							31st	172	
2015	TriStar Motorsports	10	Toyota	DAY; QL^{‡}	ATL	LVS; 40	PHO; 40	CAL; 40	TEX; 38	BRI; 39	RCH; 40	TAL; QL^{±}	IOW																										38th	119	
2015	TriStar Motorsports	19	Toyota											CLT; 40	DOV; 40	MCH; 39	CHI; 40	DAY; DNQ	KEN; 40	NHA; 40	IND; 40	IOW; 40	GLN; 40	MOH; 40	BRI; 40	ROA; 40	DAR; 38	RCH; 40	CHI; 40	KEN; 39	DOV; 40	CLT; 40	KAN; 40	TEX; 40	PHO; 40	HOM; 40			38th	119	
2016	Rick Ware Racing	17	Chevy	DAY; 37																																			28th	219	
2016	TriStar Motorsports	10	Toyota		ATL; 40	LVS; 40	PHO; 40	CAL	TEX; DNQ			TAL; 40											GLN; 33	MOH; 40	BRI	ROA; 39								TEX; 40					28th	219	
2016	Rick Ware Racing	15	Ford							BRI; 27																													28th	219	
2016	TriStar Motorsports	14	Toyota								RCH; 37		DOV; 33	CLT; 34	POC; 34	MCH; 33	IOW; 33		KEN; 33	NHA; 35	IND; 36	IOW; 31					DAR; 30	RCH	CHI; 31	KEN; 32	DOV; 32	CLT; 37							28th	219	
2016	Rick Ware Racing	17	Toyota															DAY; 7																					28th	219	
2016	B. J. McLeod Motorsports	99	Ford																														KAN; 21		PHO; 37	HOM; 32			28th	219	
2017	B. J. McLeod Motorsports	8	Chevy	DAY; 39	ATL; 26	LVS; 36	PHO	CAL; 29	TEX; 36	BRI; 25																													37th	102	
2017	RSS Racing	93	Chevy								RCH; 40			DOV; 40	POC; 40	MCH; 35	IOW; 40		KEN; 37	NHA; 38	IND; 40	IOW; 40	GLN; 38	MOH; 39	BRI; 39	ROA; 40	DAR; 39	RCH; 40	CHI; 39	KEN; 40	DOV; 40								37th	102	
2017	B. J. McLeod Motorsports	8	Toyota									TAL; 10						DAY; 20																					37th	102	
2017	B. J. McLeod Motorsports	78	Chevy										CLT; DNQ																										37th	102	
2017	RSS Racing	38	Chevy																													CLT; 40	KAN; 40	TEX; 37	PHO; 37	HOM; 40			37th	102	
2018	RSS Racing	38	Chevy	DAY; 11	ATL; 40	LVS; 39											IOW; 35					IOW; 35			BRI; 26														37th	108	
2018	RSS Racing	93	Chevy				PHO; 40	CAL; 39	TEX; 40	BRI; 39	RCH; 40	TAL; 13	DOV; 40	CLT; 39	POC; 40	MCH; 40		CHI; 39	DAY; 23	KEN; 40	NHA; 40		GLN; 39	MOH; 39		ROA; 40	DAR; 39	IND; 40	LVS; 39	RCH; 39	CLT; 39	DOV; 39	KAN; 34	TEX; 38	PHO; 40				37th	108	
2018	RSS Racing	37	Chevy																																	HOM; 39			37th	108	
2019	RSS Racing	93	Chevy	DAY; 7	ATL; 36																																		41st	85	
2019	RSS Racing	38	Chevy			LVS; 32	PHO; 33	CAL; 36	TEX; 38	BRI; 34	RCH; 38	TAL; 35	DOV; 36	CLT; 37	POC; 36	MCH; 36	IOW; 37	CHI; 37	DAY; 7	KEN; 36	NHA	IOW	GLN	MOH	BRI	ROA	DAR	IND	LVS	RCH	CLT	DOV	KAN	TEX	PHO	HOM			41st	85	
2020	RSS Racing	38	Chevy	DAY; QL^{#}	LVS	CAL								TAL; 29																									54th	39	
2020	RSS Racing	93	Chevy				PHO; 15	DAR	CLT; 36	BRI; 35	ATL	HOM	HOM		POC; 31	IND	KEN	KEN	TEX	KAN	ROA	DAY	DOV	DOV	DAY	DAR	RCH	RCH	BRI	LVS	TAL	CLT	KAN	TEX	MAR	PHO			54th	39	
^{†} – Qualified for Harry Gant. · ^{‡} – Qualified but replaced by Scott Lagasse Jr. · ^{±} – Replaced by Charles Lewandoski. · ^{#} – Qualified but replaced by Ross Chastain.

==== Camping World Truck Series ====
NASCAR Camping World Truck Series results
Year	Team	No.	Make	1	2	3	4	5	6	7	8	9	10	11	12	13	14	15	16	17	18	19	20	21	22	23	24	25	26	NCWTC	Pts	Ref
1997	Brewco Motorsports	47	Chevy	WDW	TUS	HOM	PHO	POR	EVG	I70	NHA	TEX	BRI	NZH	MLW	LVL	CNS	HPT	IRP	FLM	NSV	GLN	RCH; 33	MAR	SON	MMR	CAL	PHO	LVS	128th	64	
2008	Key Motorsports	40	Chevy	DAY	CAL	ATL	MAR	KAN	CLT	MFD	DOV	TEX	MCH	MLW	MEM	KEN	IRP	NSH; 26	BRI; 27	GTW; 18	NHA	LVS; 7	TAL; 21	MAR; 31	ATL; 23	TEX; 24	PHO	HOM		33rd	777	
2012	RSS Racing	37	Chevy	DAY	MAR	CAR	KAN	CLT	DOV	TEX	KEN	IOW	CHI; 35	POC	MCH	BRI	ATL; DNQ	IOW	KEN	LVS	TAL	MAR	TEX	PHO	HOM					104th	0^{1}	

==== K&N Pro Series East ====
NASCAR K&N Pro Series East results
Year	Team	No.	Make	1	2	3	4	5	6	7	8	9	10	11	12	13	14	NKNPSEC	Pts	Ref
2017	Martin-McClure Racing	13	Toyota	NSM	GRE	BRI	SBO	SBO	MEM	BLN	TMP	NHA	IOW; 22	GLN	LGY	NJM	DOV	69th	22	

^{*} Season still in progress.
^{1} Ineligible for series points

=== ARCA Hooters SuperCar Series ===
(key) (Bold – Pole position awarded by qualifying time. Italics – Pole position earned by points standings or practice time. * – Most laps led.)

ARCA Hooters SuperCar Series results
Year	Team	No.	Make	1	2	3	4	5	6	7	8	9	10	11	12	13	14	15	16	17	18	19	20	21	AHSS	Pts	Ref
1990	Sadler Brothers Racing	95	Buick	DAY	ATL	KIL	TAL	FRS	POC	KIL	TOL	HAG	POC	TAL	MCH	ISF	TOL	DSF	WIN	DEL	ATL; 6				98th	-	
1994	Sadler Brothers Racing	95	Ford	DAY	TAL	FIF	LVL	KIL	TOL	FRS	MCH	DMS	POC	POC	KIL	FRS	INF	I70	ISF	DSF	TOL	SLM	WIN	ATL; 25	119th	355	

=== International Race of Champions ===
(key) (Bold – Pole position. * – Most laps led.)

International Race of Champions results
Year	Make	1	2	3	4	Pos.	Pts	Ref
2001	Pontiac	DAY; 12	TAL; 8	MCH; 9	IND; 8	10th	28	

Sporting positions
Preceded by Dale Earnhardt Jr.	NASCAR Busch Series Champion; 2000	Succeeded by Kevin Harvick
Preceded by Nicky Formosa	Nashville Speedway USA Track Champion; 1990	Succeeded by Mike Reynolds
