= IROC XXVI =

26th season of the True Value International Race of Champions

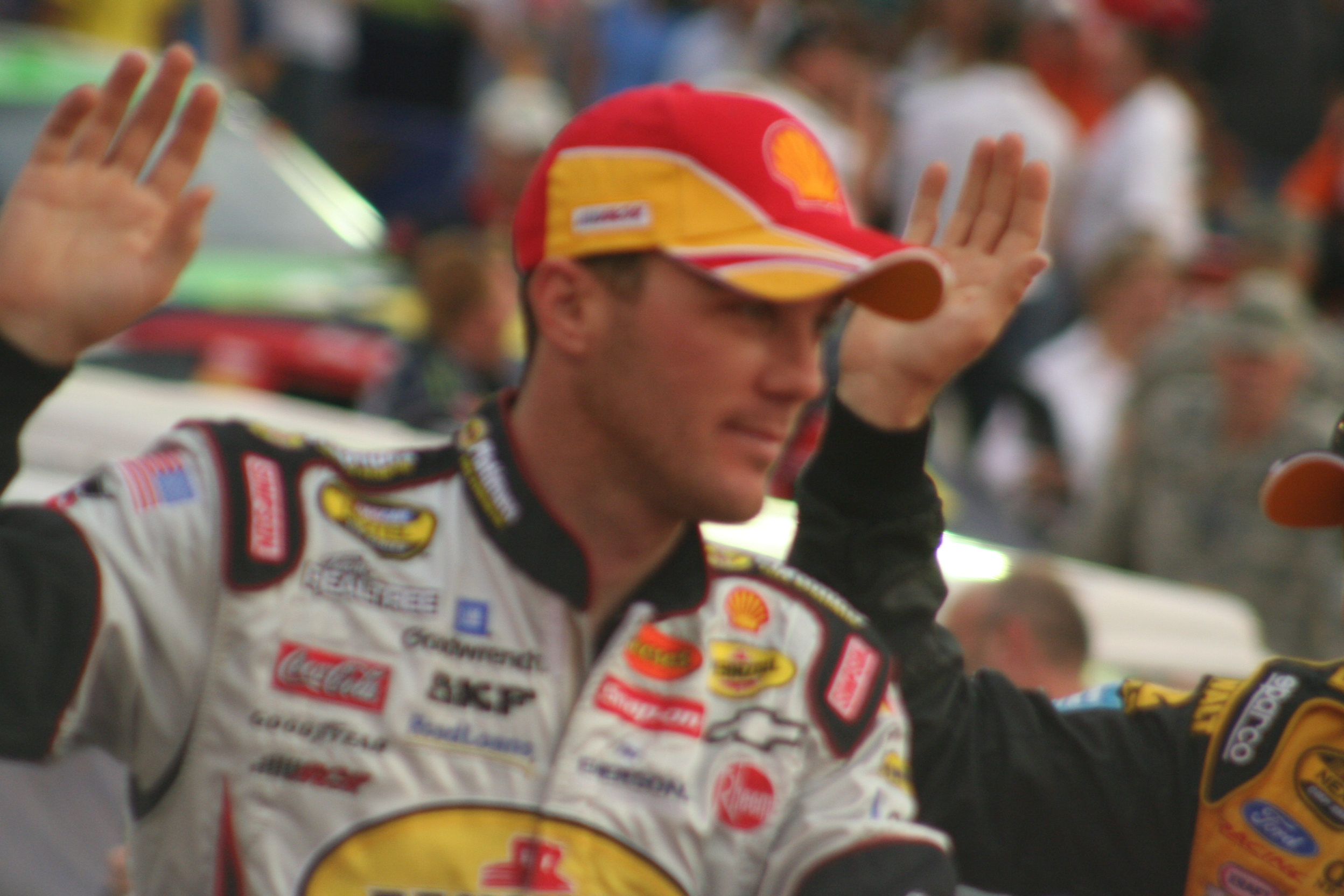
Kevin Harvick (seen in 2007), the IROC XXVI champion

IROC XXVI was the 26th season of the True Value International Race of Champions, which began on Friday, February 15, 2002 at Daytona International Speedway. The roster included 12 drivers from five separate racing leagues. The first race saw Tony Stewart earn his second IROC win. Rookie Kevin Harvick won in only his second start in race 2 at California. In the first ever IROC race at Chicagoland, Buddy Lazier, Al Unser Jr., and Hélio Castroneves gave the IRL a sweep of the top three positions in the race. In race 4 at Indianapolis, Dale Jarrett took the lead in turn one of the first lap and led the entire race for his second career IROC victory. Kevin Harvick became just the sixth driver to win the IROC title in his first season of competition, and also became the first driver to win the title while representing the NASCAR Busch Series.

The roster of drivers and final points standings were as follows:

Position	Driver	Points	Series
1	(United States) Kevin Harvick	54	2002: NASCAR Winston Cup; 2001: NASCAR Busch Series
2	(United States) Buddy Lazier	49	Indy Racing League
3	(United States) Dale Jarrett	49	NASCAR Winston Cup
4	(Brazil) Hélio Castroneves	43	Indy Racing League
5	(United States) Bobby Labonte	43	NASCAR Winston Cup
6	(United States) Tony Stewart	42	NASCAR Winston Cup
7	(United States) Al Unser Jr.^{1}	39	Indy Racing League
8	(United States) Jack Sprague	36	NASCAR Craftsman Truck Series
9	(United States) Scott Sharp	36	Indy Racing League
10	(United States) Sterling Marlin	35	NASCAR Winston Cup
11	(United States) Sam Hornish Jr.	35	Indy Racing League
12	(United States) Danny Lasoski^{2}	30	World of Outlaws

== Race One (Daytona International Speedway) ==
1. Tony Stewart
2. Sam Hornish Jr.
3. Scott Sharp
4. Jack Sprague
5. Al Unser Jr.
6. Danny Lasoski
7. Bobby Labonte
8. Sterling Marlin
9. Kevin Harvick
10. Buddy Lazier
11. Hélio Castroneves
12. Dale Jarrett

== Race Two (California Speedway) ==
1. Kevin Harvick
2. Bobby Labonte
3. Dale Jarrett
4. Sterling Marlin
5. Jack Sprague
6. Tony Stewart
7. Hélio Castroneves
8. Al Unser Jr.
9. Buddy Lazier
10. Scott Sharp
11. Sam Hornish Jr.
12. Danny Lasoski

== Race Three (Chicagoland Speedway) ==
1. Buddy Lazier
2. Al Unser Jr.
3. Hélio Castroneves
4. Kevin Harvick
5. Scott Sharp
6. Sam Hornish Jr.
7. Sterling Marlin
8. Bobby Labonte
9. Dale Jarrett
10. Jack Sprague
11. Danny Lasoski
12. Tony Stewart

== Race Four (Indianapolis Motor Speedway) ==
1. Dale Jarrett
2. Hélio Castroneves
3. Ken Schrader
4. Buddy Lazier
5. Kevin Harvick
6. Jack Sprague
7. Sterling Marlin
8. Scott Sharp
9. Bobby Labonte
10. Sam Hornish Jr.
11. Tony Stewart

== Notes ==
1. Al Unser Jr. did not compete in race four at Indianapolis.
2. Danny Lasoski did not compete in race four at Indianapolis due to injury. He was replaced by Ken Schrader.
