= Buddy Lazier =

American racecar driver (born 1967)

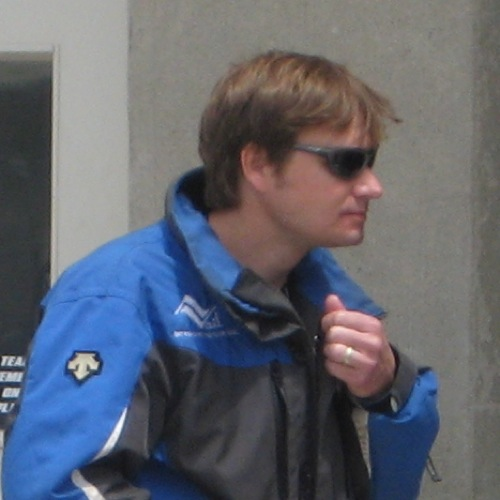
- Lazier at the Indianapolis Motor Speedway in May 2008 for the 2008 Indianapolis 500.
- Born: Robert Buddy Lazier; October 31, 1967 (age 59) Vail, Colorado, U.S.

Champ Car career
- 54 races run over 7 years
- Years active: 1989–1995
- Teams: Lazier Racing (1989); Gary Trout Motorsports (1989); Hemelgarn Racing (1990–91, 1994); Arciero Racing (1990); Dale Coyne Racing (1991); Todd Walther Racing (1991); Hemelgarn Coyne Racing (1991); Walker Racing (1991); Leader Card Racing (1992–94); Dick Simon Racing (1994); Project Indy (1995); Payton/Coyne Racing (1995); Team Menard (1995)
- Best finish: 19th – 1992
- First race: 1990 Budweiser/G.I.Joe's 200 (Portland)
- Last race: 1995 New England 200 (New Hampshire)

IndyCar Series career
- Debut season: 1996
- Former teams: Hemelgarn Racing (1996–2004); Dreyer & Reinbold Racing (2004, 2006); Panther Racing (2005); Sam Schmidt Motorsports (2007); Hemelgarn-Johnson Racing (2008–09); Lazier Partners Racing
- Starts: 104
- Championships: 1 (2000)
- Wins: 8
- Podiums: 18
- Poles: 2
- Fastest laps: 6

Previous series
- 1986–87 1986–89 1989, 1993 1989–95 2001 2001–02 2007: Canadian-American Challenge Cup; American Indycar Series; IMSA GT Championship; USAC Gold Crown Series; Grand-Am Rolex Sports Car Series; International Race of Champions; NASCAR Craftsman Truck Series

Championship titles
- 1988 1996 2000: American Indycar Series Champion; Indianapolis 500 Winner; Indy Racing League Champion

Awards
- 2003: Scott Brayton Trophy

NASCAR FedEx Freight Truck Series career
- 1 race run over 1 year
- 2007 position: 91st
- Best finish: 91st (2007)
- First race: 2007 Smith's Las Vegas 350 (Las Vegas)
- Last race: 2007 Smith's Las Vegas 350 (Las Vegas)
Wins	Top tens	Poles
0	0	0

Robert Buddy Lazier (born October 31, 1967) is an American auto racing driver, best known for winning the 1996 Indianapolis 500 and the 2000 Indy Racing League season championship.

Lazier began his racing career in the 1980s by competing in such series as the IMSA GT Championship, the SCCA Canadian-American Challenge Cup and the American Indycar Series. Lazier won the American Indycar Series championship in 1988. Lazier started his IndyCar career in 1989 by competing in the Indy Car World Series. During the season, Lazier failed to qualify for the Indianapolis 500. Lazier eventually qualified for the Indianapolis 500 in 1991. During his Champ Car career, Lazier often drove for teams that used older chassis and engines; his best finish in the Champ Car standings was a nineteenth-place finish in 1992.

Lazier began to compete in the newly formed Indy Racing League in 1996. Lazier won the Indianapolis 500 that season, and he became one of the most dominant drivers in the series for a period of time, winning eight races overall and the series championship in 2000. Lazier began to drive only at the Indianapolis 500 in 2007 and continued to enter the Indianapolis 500 through 2009. He did not return to the series until 2013 at the Indianapolis 500 when he competed for Lazier Partners Racing, a team started by his father Bob Lazier and various investors. Lazier and the team repeated their efforts in 2014, 2015, 2016 and, for the final time, in 2017.

== Career ==
Lazier was originally a competitive skier, and for a time was part of the U.S. Olympic developmental program.

=== Canadian-American Challenge Cup ===
For 1986, Lazier competed in the SCCA Canadian-American Challenge Cup, driving the No. 43 car for the Texas American Racing Team, driving a Watson 82. Lazier made his début at the second race of the season at Summit Point Motorsports Park. Lazier failed to start the race and was credited with an 18th-place finish. Lazier also competed at St. Louis International Raceway; he started fifth and finished in twelfth place due to a chassis issue. Lazier finished in 26th place in the final standings with four points. In 1987, Lazier remained with the Texas American Racing Team, driving the No. 19 March 85C car. At the season-opening race at Willow Springs International Raceway, Lazier qualified on pole position, led 22 of 48 laps and won the race. Lazier also qualified on pole position at Wisconsin State Fairgrounds Park Speedway, led for 25 laps but ultimately finished in ninth place. Lazier finished in third place at Pueblo Motorsports Park and fourth place at the season-ending race at Phoenix International Raceway. Lazier finished in fourth place in the final championship standings with 62 points.

=== IMSA GT Championship ===
In 1989, Lazier competed in the IMSA GT Championship, driving the No. 43 Motorsports Marketing Fabcar-Porsche with John Higgens, Lorenzo Lamas and Justus Reid in the Lights class. Lazier only drove the car at the season-opening SunBank 24 at Daytona. The car started in 46th place but ultimately retired after 395 laps due to an engine failure. The car was classified fourth place in its class and in 31st place overall. In 1993, Lazier returned to the series to compete, in the Lights class, in the season-opening Rolex 24 at Daytona in the No. 42 Pro-Technik Racing Fabcar FEP/002-Porsche with Anthony Lazzaro, Chris Ivey, Mike Sheehan and Sam Shalala. The car started in 58th place overall and finished in 25th overall, seventh place in its class. Lazier only competed at Daytona, therefore finishing in 23rd place in the final Lights championship standings with 18 points.

=== American Indycar Series ===
Lazier began to compete in the American Indycar Series in 1988 after Lazier's car owner and teammate, Bill Tempero, purchased Can-Am. Lazier drove a March 85C for Tempero's Texas American Racing Team. At the season-opening race at Willow Springs International Raceway, Lazier qualified on pole position and won the race. Lazier also won the Illinois Grand Prix at St. Louis International Raceway from pole position, the race at Tioga Motorsports Park and both races at the season-ending Bud Light 100 at Willow Springs. The only race that Lazier did not win was the AMG Eurospeed Grand Prix of Colorado at Mountain View Motorsports Park, where Lazier finished second to Robby Unser. Lazier won the inaugural season championship with 152 points.

For 1989, Lazier returned with the Texas American Racing Team, driving a March 85C. At the season-opening races at I-70 Speedway, Lazier finished second to Unser in the first race and crashed out of the second race after completing ten laps. At the second pair of races at Memphis Motorsports Park, Lazier qualified on pole position for the second race. Lazier won the second race at Colorado National Speedway. Lazier finished the season by winning the first race at Willow Springs before retiring from the second race due to a motor mount issue. Lazier finished in seventh place in the final standings with 173 points.

=== CART Indy Car World Series ===
==== 1989–90 ====
In 1989, Lazier attempted to qualify for his first CART Indy Car World Series race, the Indianapolis 500. Lazier drove the No. 35 Lazier Racing March 87C-Cosworth DFX. Lazier crashed in practice and failed to qualify for the race. Lazier later drove for Gary Trout Motorsports in the No. 23 March 87C-Cosworth DFX at the season-ending Champion Spark Plug 300 at Laguna Seca Raceway. Lazier again failed to qualify for the race. In 1990, Lazier first competed at the Indianapolis 500. Lazier drove for Hemelgarn Racing in the No. 91 Lola T88/00-Buick. Lazier crashed his primary car in practice but was able to provisionally qualify for the race in his back-up car. At the beginning of Bump Day, Lazier was the slowest car in the field. John Paul Jr. bumped Lazier from the field and Lazier ultimately failed to qualify. Lazier drove a partial season for Hemelgarn, moving to the team's No. 71 car. Lazier qualified for his first 500-mile race at the Marlboro 500 at Michigan International Speedway in the No. 24 Penske PC17-Buick for Arciero Racing. Lazier started and finished in 26th, retiring from the race early on due to a gearbox problem. Lazier achieved a best finish of twelfth place at the Molson Indy Vancouver at Concord Pacific Place, scoring his only championship point of 1990 – a result which scored him 29th place in the final standings.

==== 1991 ====
For 1991, Lazier drove for various teams in various cars. Lazier first drove for Dale Coyne Racing in the No. 90 Lola T88/00-Cosworth DFX at the season-opening Gold Coast IndyCar Grand Prix at the Surfers Paradise Street Circuit. Lazier started 24th, but his race lasted just over a lap due to suspension failure. Lazier moved to Todd Walther Racing and the No. 44 Lola Cars T89/00-Cosworth DFS at the Toyota Grand Prix of Long Beach. Lazier started in 26th place, but retired after eight laps due to an engine failure. Lazier returned to Hemelgarn Racing at the Indianapolis 500 in the No. 71 Lola T90/00-Buick. Lazier qualified for the race for the first time, starting 23rd. On the first lap of the race, Gary Bettenhausen got sideways in the first turn and Lazier hit the outside wall in avoidance; he continued to the pit lane where he retired due to accident damage. Lazier was credited with a 33rd-place finish.

Lazier was entered in the No. 19 Lola T90/00-Cosworth DFS for Dale Coyne Racing at the Miller Genuine Draft 200 at the Milwaukee Mile, but Dale Coyne replaced Lazier prior to qualifying. At the following race, the Valvoline Grand Prix of Detroit, Lazier returned to Coyne's No. 90 car, now utilizing a Lola T90/00-Cosworth DFS. Lazier started in twentieth place and finished in eighteenth place, five laps down. Lazier returned to the No. 19 car for the Budweiser Grand Prix of Cleveland at Cleveland Burke Lakefront Airport. Lazier started in twentieth place but recorded his first points-scoring finish of the season with an eleventh-place finish, albeit four laps down. After the event, two of the teams that Lazier had driven for in the 1991 season – Hemelgarn Racing and Dale Coyne Racing – formed an alliance, resulting in the team being called Hemelgarn Coyne Racing. Lazier drove for the team at the Molson Indy Toronto at Exhibition Place. Lazier started in 20th place, but retired after seventeen laps due to an engine failure.

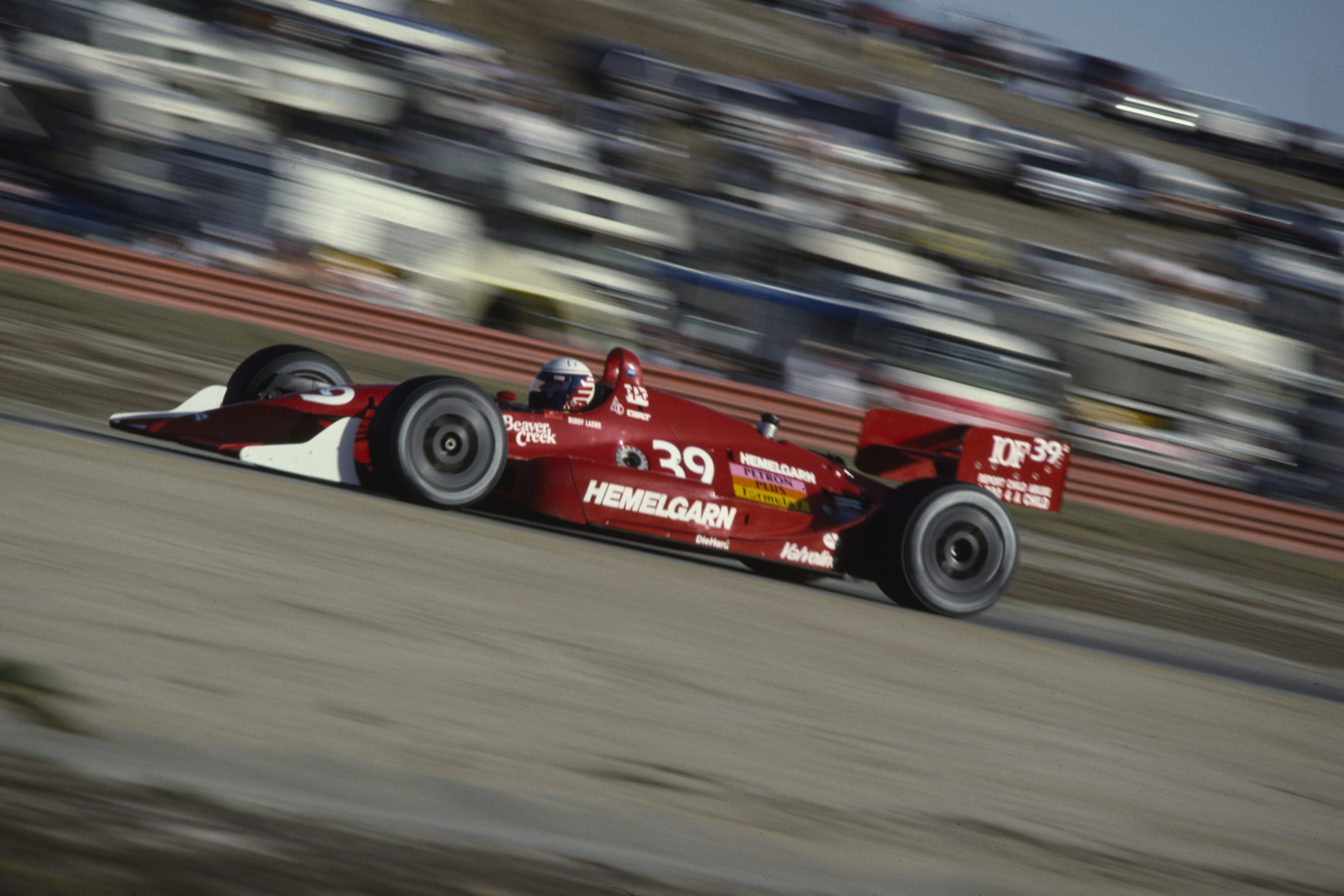
Lazier driving at the 1991 Toyota Monterey Grand Prix at Laguna Seca Raceway.

Lazier drove the same car at the Texaco/Havoline Grand Prix of Denver, where he recorded his best results of the 1991 season. Lazier started in sixteenth place and finished in ninth place, two laps down. Lazier moved to Walker Racing, driving the No. 10 Lola T90/00-Cosworth DFS at the Pioneer Electronics 200 at Mid-Ohio Sports Car Course. Lazier started in seventeenth place but did not complete a single lap due to an electrical issue. Lazier returned to Coyne's No. 90 car at the Texaco/Havoline 200 at Road America. Lazier started in nineteenth place but again did not complete a single lap due to an electrical issue. Lazier then competed in the season-ending Toyota Monterey Grand Prix at Laguna Seca for Hemelgarn Coyne Racing in No. 39 Lola T90/00-Cosworth DFS. Lazier started in 21st place but retired after 41 laps due to an engine failure. Lazier finished in 22nd place in the final championship standings with 6 points.

==== 1992 ====
In 1992, Lazier began to drive for Leader Card Racing and at first, drove the No. 21 Lola T90/00-Buick. At the season-opening Daikyo IndyCar Grand Prix at Surfers Paradise, Lazier started in twentieth place and finished in sixteenth place, eighteen laps down. At the Valvoline 200 at Phoenix International Raceway, Lazier started in seventeenth place and finished in fourteenth place, thirty-three laps down. Lazier scored his first point of the season at the Toyota Grand Prix of Long Beach, scoring a twelfth-place finish despite running out of fuel after completing eighty of the race's 105 laps. At the Indianapolis 500, Lazier began to drive an unsponsored Lola T91/00-Buick. Lazier crashed during practice for the race, but he was able to make the field, in 24th place. Lazier retired due to an engine failure after completing 139 laps, and was scored in fourteenth place. At the following two races, the ITT Automotive Grand Prix of Detroit and the Budweiser G.I. Joe's 200 at Portland International Raceway, Lazier was scored in 24th place on both occasions, retiring due to a broken half shaft at Detroit and a clutch problem at Portland.

The team regained sponsorship from Seaway Food Town and Project Pacific, when they used the T90/00 at the Miller Genuine Draft 200 at the Milwaukee Mile where Lazier started and finished in seventeenth place, twenty-four laps down. The team added sponsorship from Viper Auto Security for the rest of the season starting with the Molson Indy Toronto at Exhibition Place, where Lazier started in twentieth place and finished in fifteenth place, twelve laps down. Lazier recorded his best finish of the season at the following race, the Marlboro 500 at Michigan International Speedway, with a seventh-place finish, fourteen laps down. Starting at the Budweiser Grand Prix of Cleveland at Cleveland Burke Lakefront Airport, the team used an Ilmor-Chevrolet engine; Lazier started and finished in 23rd place due to an engine failure after 25 laps. The team reverted to Buick for the Bosch Spark Plug Grand Prix at Pennsylvania International Raceway. Lazier started in nineteenth place and finished in fifteenth place, fifteen laps down. Lazier finished a career-best nineteenth in the championship with ten points.

==== 1993 ====
For 1993, Lazier returned with Leader Card Racing to drive the No. 20 Lola T91/00-Ilmor. At the season-opening Australian FAI IndyCar Grand Prix at Surfers Paradise, Lazier started in 25th place but retired after 35 laps due to a suspension failure. At Phoenix, Lazier started in eighteenth place and finished in seventeenth place due to a header problem after 141 laps. Lazier finished his first race of the season at Long Beach; he started in 24th place and finished in nineteenth place, fifteen laps down. At the Indianapolis 500, the team once again acquired sponsorship from Viper Auto Security, and restored a Buick engine to the chassis. During qualifying Lazier's car blew an engine and was unable to qualify for the race. At Milwaukee, Seaway Food Town and Project Pacific returned as the sponsors for the team. Lazier started in twentieth place and finished in fifteenth place, thirteen laps down.

At the ITT Automotive Grand Prix of Detroit, Lazier started in 26th place but crashed out of the race after completing 55 laps. The team then used a Lola T92/00-Ilmor at Cleveland and Michigan. At Cleveland, the car had additional sponsorship from Viper Auto Security and Applebee's; Lazier started in 23rd place but suffered an electrical issue after completing 61 laps. At Michigan, the car was unsponsored and Lazier started in eighteenth place. Oil pressure problems occurred during the race, forcing Lazier's retirement after completing 43 laps. The team restored the Buick engine for the New England 200 at New Hampshire International Speedway, where Lazier failed to qualify. Lazier scored his best finish of the season at the Texaco/Havoline 200 at Road America with a fourteenth-place finish. The team acquired sponsorship from Financial World starting at the Pioneer Electronics 200 at Mid-Ohio Sports Car Course; Lazier finished in twentieth place in the race, and ultimately finished 35th in the championship.

==== 1994 ====
In 1994, Lazier returned with Leader Card Racing to drive the No. 23 Lola T93/00-Ilmor. At the season-opening Australian FAI Indycar Grand Prix at Surfers Paradise, Lazier was too slow to qualify. Lazier made his season debut at the next race, the Slick 50 200 at Phoenix. Lazier started in 25th place and finished in a season-best thirteenth-place finish, ten laps down. At Long Beach, Lazier started in thirtieth place but retired due to an exhaust problem after completing six laps. At the Indianapolis 500, Lazier practiced in his usual Leader Card Racing car, as well as both the No. 94 Hemelgarn Racing Lola T92/00-Buick and the No. 5 Lola T94/00-Ford Cosworth XB for Dick Simon Racing. Lazier did not complete a qualifying attempt in any of the three cars and failed to qualify for the race.

At the following race, the Miller Genuine Draft 200 at the Milwaukee Mile, Lazier started in 24th place and finished in eighteenth place, twelve laps down. Lazier started in 27th place at the following race, the ITT Automotive Grand Prix of Detroit, and finished in seventeenth place, two laps down. Lazier started in 29th place and finished in 24th place in the Budweiser/G. I. Joe's 200 at Portland International Raceway, after running out of fuel after completing 91 laps. Following Portland, Lazier started only two more races during the season. At the Budweiser Grand Prix of Cleveland at Cleveland Burke Lakefront Airport, Lazier was replaced by pay driver Giovanni Lavaggi. Lazier qualified but did not start either the Molson Indy Toronto at Exhibition Place and the Slick 50 200 at New Hampshire, and he failed to qualify at Mid-Ohio and Nazareth. Lazier did however compete in the Marlboro 500 at Michigan International Speedway and the Molson Indy Vancouver at Concord Pacific Place. Lazier started in 21st place at Michigan, but failed to finish due to an electrical issue, while a half shaft problem caused him to retire at Vancouver. Lazier finished in 36th place in the final championship standings.

==== 1995 ====
Lazier did not return with Leader Card for 1995, instead driving for various other teams. Lazier first drove for Project Indy in the No. 64 Reynard 94i-Ford Cosworth XB at the second race of the season, the Gold Coast Indy at Surfers Paradise. Lazier started in 24th place and finished in 21st place, retiring with broken transmission after completing 32 laps. Lazier then drove for Payton/Coyne Racing in the No. 19 Lola T94/00-Ford Cosworth XB at Nazareth. Lazier started in twentieth place but crashed out of the race with Paul Tracy after completing 38 laps. At the Indianapolis 500, Lazier drove for Team Menard originally in the No. 51 Lola T93/00-Menard. Lazier then practiced the team's No. 40 Lola T95/00-Menard entry that Arie Luyendyk qualified. Lazier qualified on the second day of qualifying in the No. 80 Lola T95/00-Menard, doing so in 23rd place. Lazier retired from the race after 45 laps due to fuel system problems.

Lazier returned to Payton/Coyne Racing's No. 19 car, now utilizing a Lola T95/00 chassis, at Milwaukee. Lazier started in 24th place and finished in eighteenth place, twelve laps down. Lazier returned to Project Indy's No. 64 entry at Toronto. Lazier started in 27th place and finished in fifteenth place, five laps down. Lazier returned to Payton/Coyne Racing's No. 19 car, which had reverted to the T94/00 chassis, for Michigan. Lazier started in twentieth place and finished in a season-best fourteenth place, twenty-seven laps down. The final race of the season that Lazier competed in was the New England 200 at New Hampshire. Lazier finished in 35th place in the final championship standings.

=== Indy Racing League ===
==== 1996 ====
Lazier moved to the Indy Racing League to compete in its inaugural season in 1996 for Hemelgarn Racing in the No. 91 Reynard 95i-Ford Cosworth XB. At the season-opening Indy 200 at Walt Disney World Speedway, Lazier recorded the series' inaugural pole position. In the race Lazier led for 28 laps, but retired due to brake failure after completing 61 laps. During practice for the following race, the Dura Lube 200 at Phoenix International Raceway, Lazier was involved in a crash with Lyn St. James. He suffered a fractured vertebra and was ruled out of the race.

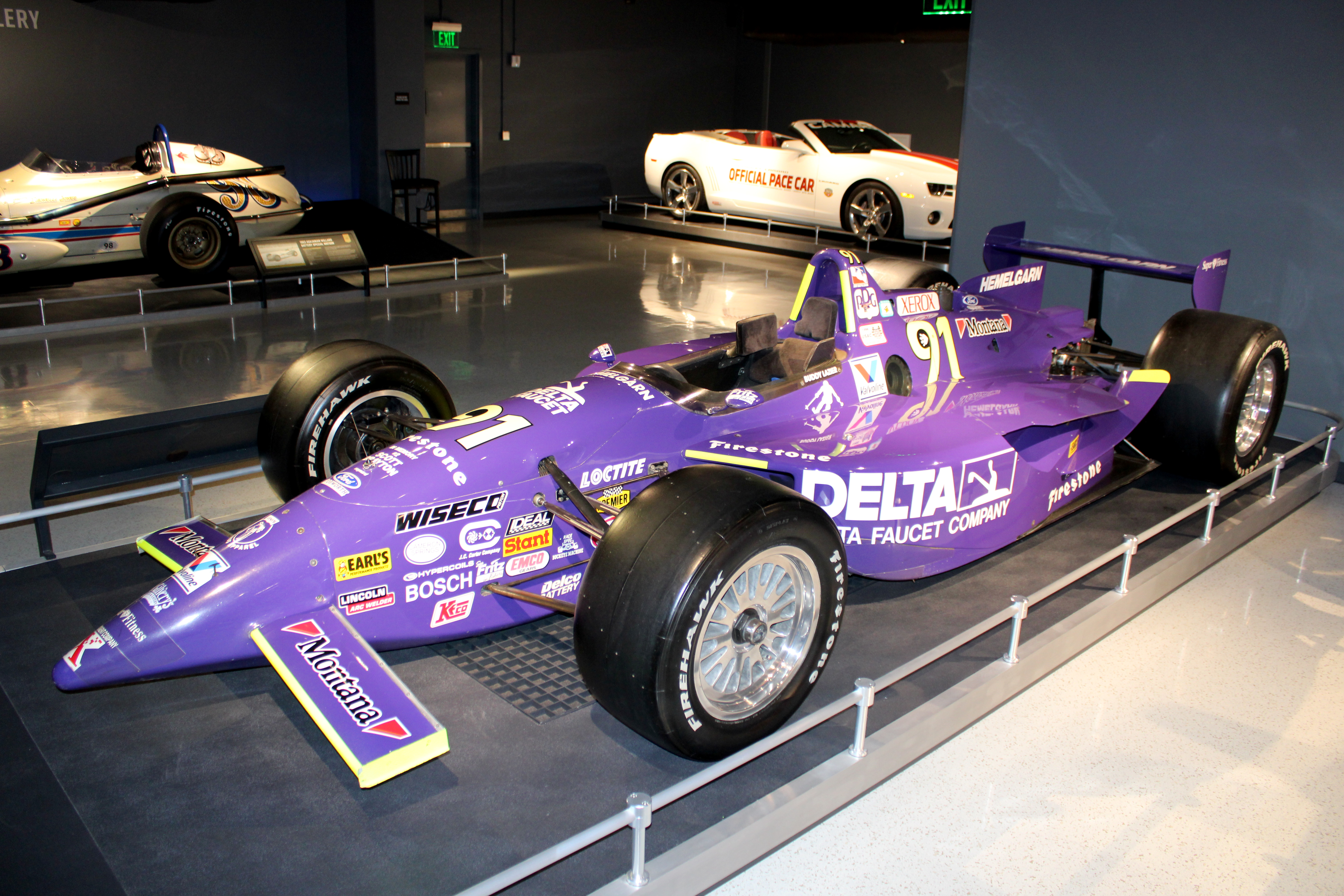
The car Lazier used to win the 1996 Indianapolis 500 at the Indianapolis Motor Speedway Hall of Fame Museum.

Still in pain and walking with a cane, Lazier returned two months later for the season-ending race, the Indianapolis 500. His car was fitted with a special shock-absorbing seat to reduce the risk of re-injuring his back. Prior to the race the team gained additional sponsorship from Montana Rail Link. Lazier initially qualified in seventh place but was promoted to fifth place after Arie Luyendyk's time was disallowed and pole sitter Scott Brayton was fatally injured during practice. Lazier was among the leaders all day, battling with Tony Stewart, Davy Jones, Roberto Guerrero and Luyendyk. Stewart retired after 82 laps due to an engine failure and Luyendyk was eliminated after a collision with Eliseo Salazar. Guerrero fell two laps down after having a fire in his pit stall. During caution periods Lazier would raise his hands out of the cockpit to stretch his fingers, prompting many fans, thinking he was waving, to wave back at him. Lazier's team brought him in for his final pit stop several laps later than the rest of the leaders, which put him behind on the track but able to turn up his turbo boost pressure and run faster to the finish. With ten laps to go Lazier was running in third place behind Jones and Alessandro Zampedri but easily passed both of them over the next two laps and led the rest of the way to win his first IndyCar race, leading a total of 43 laps. Lazier finished fourteenth in the championship with 159 points.

==== 1996–97 ====
For the 1996–97 season, Lazier returned with Hemelgarn Racing. During the 1996 portion of the season, Lazier drove the No. 91 Reynard 95i-Ford Cosworth XB. At the season-opening True Value 200 at New Hampshire International Speedway, Lazier started in fourth place and was running in second place, the only car on the lead lap besides race leader Tony Stewart. On lap 67, race broadcaster ABC was broadcasting Lazier's conversation with his team when Stewart attempted to lap Lazier in the fourth turn. The two cars then made contact and Lazier spun and crashed into the wall. Unaware that he was on an open mic, Lazier first said, (in reference to Stewart) "The son of a bitch just ran into the back of me," and then said to his pit crew, "He must have just fucking hit me in the back." After being released from the infield care center, Lazier quickly apologized for his language during a pitlane interview. At the following race, the Las Vegas 500K at Las Vegas Motor Speedway, Lazier started in 4th place and retired after 35 laps due to handling issues.

For the 1997 portion of the season, Lazier drove the No. 91 Dallara IR7-Infiniti, with additional sponsorship from Xerox and Cinergy. At the Indy 200 at Walt Disney World, Lazier started in eleventh place and finished in fifth place, his first top-five of the season. At the Phoenix 200 at Phoenix International Raceway, Lazier started in thirteenth place and finished in 21st place due to an engine failure after 31 laps. Prior to the Indianapolis 500, the Infiniti engine was replaced with an Oldsmobile engine. Lazier qualified in tenth place and was fastest on two practice days post-qualifying. In the race Lazier battled with Luyendyk, Scott Goodyear, Jeff Ward, Stewart and Robbie Buhl, leading for seven laps and finished fourth behind Luyendyk, Goodyear and Ward. At the following race, the True Value 500 at Texas Motor Speedway, Lazier started in fourth place and led twice for a combined total of 57 laps. On lap 157, Lazier retired from the race due to an engine failure and was scored in seventeenth place. Lazier then finished in eighth place at the following race, the Samsonite 200 at Pikes Peak International Raceway. Lazier achieved his first win of the season at the VisionAire 500 at Charlotte Motor Speedway, after starting in 5th place and leading for 58 laps. At the Pennzoil 200 at New Hampshire, Lazier started in fifteenth place and finished in twelfth place, five laps down. At the season-ending Las Vegas 500K, Lazier started in fourteenth place but retired due to a mechanical problem after four laps. Lazier finished in eighth place in the final point standings with 209 points, having been as high as fifth during the season.

==== 1998 ====
In 1998, Lazier returned with Hemelgarn Racing to drive the No. 91 Dallara IR8-Oldsmobile. At the season-opening Indy 200 at Walt Disney World, Lazier started in 8th place after qualifying was rained out. In the race, Lazier led for 34 laps, but crashed out while attempting to lap Stéphan Grégoire in the second turn. At the following race, the Dura Lube 200 at Phoenix, Lazier started in ninth place but retired due to an engine failure after nine laps. At the Indianapolis 500, Lazier qualified in eleventh place. In the race Lazier ran in the top five and battled with Billy Boat, Kenny Bräck, Luyendyk, Greg Ray, John Paul Jr. and Eddie Cheever for the lead. In the final twenty laps, Cheever and Lazier were the main contenders. Lazier closed to within 1.1 seconds of Cheever, and despite a late-race caution due to Marco Greco's car smoking, Cheever led Lazier home at the finish.

At the following race, the True Value 500 at Texas, Lazier started and finished in eleventh place due to a wheel bearing problem after completing 194 laps. Lazier then finished in seventh place at the following race, the New England 200 at New Hampshire. Lazier then achieved his second second-place finish of the season at the Pep Boys 400K at Dover Downs International Speedway after leading for seven laps. At the following race, the VisionAire 500K at Lowe's Motor Speedway, Lazier started in 14th place and finished in thirteenth place, thirty-seven laps down. At the Radisson 200 at Pikes Peak, Lazier started in seventeenth place and finished in seventh place, one lap down. Lazier then started in eighteenth place at the Atlanta 500 Classic at Atlanta Motor Speedway, but retired due to an engine failure after completing 136 laps. At the following race, the Lone Star 500 at Texas, Lazier started in nineteenth place and finished in sixth place, two laps down, after leading for fourteen laps. At the season-ending Las Vegas 500K at Las Vegas, Lazier started in seventeenth place and led for sixty laps en route to third place. Lazier finish the season in a then-career best fifth place in the final championship standings with 262 points.

==== 1999 ====
In 1999, Lazier returned with Hemelgarn Racing to drive the No. 91 Dallara IR9-Oldsmobile. At the season-opening TransWorld Diversified Services Indy 200 at Walt Disney World Speedway, Lazier started in eighth place and finished in tenth place, two laps down. At the second race of the season, the MCI WorldCom 200 at Phoenix, Lazier started in fifteenth place and was involved in a crash with Eddie Cheever on lap 149 in turn 3. At Lowe's Motor Speedway, Lazier started in fourteenth place and was soon battling with Ray for the lead; Lazier led for 23 laps. On lap 59 Stan Wattles's car had a suspension failure, with Paul Jr. then hitting the debris from the car sending it into the seating area and three spectators were killed. The race immediately went under caution with Lazier as the leader. Lazier then made a pit stop to replace a punctured tire. After eighteen laps of caution the race was abandoned, with no points awarded. At the Indianapolis 500, the team gained additional sponsorship from Tae Bo and Lazier qualified in 22nd place. Lazier was not a factor in the race and finished in seventh place, two laps down.

At the following race, the Longhorn 500 at Texas, Lazier started in 24th place and finished in fourteenth place, eight laps down. At Pikes Peak, Lazier started in twelfth place and finished in fifth place. At the Kobalt Mechanics Tools 500 at Atlanta, Lazier started in fifteenth place and finished in 21st place due to a crash on lap 114 with Sam Schmidt while battling for the lead. Lazier then scored his best finish of the season with a second-place finish at the MBNA Mid-Atlantic 200 at Dover Downs, having started in seventeenth place. Lazier followed this up with a fourth-place finish at the Colorado Indy 200 at Pikes Peak after starting in ninth place. Lazier then finished in 11th place, nine laps down, at the Vegas.com 500 at Las Vegas, after starting in tenth place. Lazier then finished in tenth place, four laps down, at the season-ending Mall.com 500 at Texas after starting in sixteenth place. Lazier finished the season in sixth place in the final championship standings with 224 points, having been as high as fourth in points.

==== 2000 ====
In 2000, Lazier first drove the No. 91 Riley & Scott Mk VII-Oldsmobile for Hemelgarn Racing. At the season-opening Delphi Indy 200 at Walt Disney World, Lazier started in fifth place and led for 47 laps and finished in second place. At the second race of the season, the MCI WorldCom Indy 200 at Phoenix, Lazier started in 26th place, having missed qualifying. Lazier first took the lead on lap 151 and led through lap 155 when Robbie Buhl took the lead. Lazier then retook the lead on lap 161 and led the remaining forty laps to win his first race since the 1997 VisionAire 500. Lazier became the first driver to win an IRL race after starting in last place, and became the third driver to win an Indy car race from last place at Phoenix after Mike Mosley in 1974 and Roberto Guerrero in 1987. Following the race, Lazier led the point standings for the first time in his career.

At the Vegas Indy 300 at Las Vegas, Lazier started in 22nd place and finished in twentieth place due to a fuel pump issue after completing 65 laps. At the Indianapolis 500 the Riley & Scott was replaced by the Dallara IR00 for the remainder of the season. Lazier qualified in sixteenth place, but quickly moved into the top-five. In the second half of the race, Lazier became one of the few drivers to challenge race leader Juan Pablo Montoya. Lazier set the fastest lap of the race on lap 198 with a speed of 218.494 mph (351.632 km/h). Lazier was unable to catch Montoya, who won by 7.1839 seconds. At the following race, the Casino Magic 500 at Texas, Lazier qualified on pole position and led for 62 laps, but ultimately finished in 7th place. At Pikes Peak, Lazier started in thirteenth place and retired on the second lap of the race due to an engine failure.

At the Midas 500 Classic at Atlanta, Lazier started in eleventh place and led for two laps before finishing in second place. Following the race Lazier retook the points lead, ahead of the inaugural Belterra Resort Indy 300 at Kentucky Speedway. Lazier started in seventh place and led for forty laps to win his second race of the season, also setting the race's fastest lap. Going into the season-ending Excite 500 at Texas, Lazier led Goodyear by 38 points and Cheever by 41 points, with a maximum of 53 points available. Goodyear won the race ahead of Cheever, while fourth place was good enough for the championship. Lazier won the championship with 290 points, eighteen ahead of Goodyear and 33 ahead of Cheever. Lazier is the last driver to be born in the 1960s to win an IndyCar championship.

==== 2001 ====
For 2001, Lazier drove the No. 91 Dallara IR01-Oldsmobile for Hemelgarn Racing. At the season-opening Pennzoil Copper World Indy 200 at Phoenix, Lazier started in sixth place and finished in third place. At the Infiniti Grand Prix of Miami at Homestead-Miami Speedway, Lazier started in third place and finished in twentieth place, after crashing on lap 177 in turn 4. At the following race, the zMax 500 at Atlanta, Lazier started in ninth place and finished in sixth place, one lap down. At the Indianapolis 500, Lazier gained additional sponsorship from Life Fitness for the race and qualified in tenth place. In the race, Lazier came into the pits after nine laps saying that his engine was running on only seven cylinders. Lazier would eventually rejoin the race and finished in eighteenth place, eight laps down.

At the first Texas race, Lazier started in thirteenth place and finished in fourth place. At Pikes Peak, Lazier started in fifth place and took the lead on lap 157 after Sam Hornish Jr., who had led for 152 of the previous 156 laps, suffered handling issues. Lazier led the remaining 43 laps of the race for his first win of the season. Lazier then won the SunTrust Indy Challenge at Richmond International Raceway after starting in fourth place, leading 224 of 250 laps. Following the race, Lazier moved into second place in the point standings, fifty points behind Hornish. At the Ameristar Casino Indy 200 at Kansas Speedway, Lazier started in twelfth place and finished in fifth place after leading for thirteen laps. At the next race, the Harrah's 200 at Nashville Superspeedway, Lazier started in sixth place and led for 71 laps en route to his third win of the season. With the win, Lazier took the record for the most wins in the IRL with six.

Lazier then won his fourth race of the season at Kentucky after starting in 11th place and led for 84 laps. Following the race Lazier was only 25 points behind Hornish. At the Gateway Indy 250 at Gateway International Raceway, Lazier started in second place after qualifying was rained out. In the race Lazier finished in thirteenth place, ten laps down. At the following race, the Delphi Indy 300 at Chicagoland Speedway, Lazier started in ninth place and finished in eleventh place, two laps down. Hornish finished in second place to Jaques Lazier, to clinch the championship with a round to spare. At the season-ending Chevy 500 at Texas, Lazier started in second place after qualifying was rained out again. Lazier led a lap, but ultimately retired from the race after suffering an engine failure. Despite winning a season-high four races, Lazier finished runner-up to Hornish in the final championship standings with 398 points.

==== 2002 ====
For 2002, Lazier returned with Hemelgarn Racing to drive the No. 91 Dallara IR02-Chevrolet. At the season-opening Grand Prix of Miami at Homestead, Lazier started in sixteenth place and finished in 22nd place due to an oil pressure problem after completing 111 laps. At the following race, the Bombardier ATV 200 at Phoenix, Lazier started in ninth place and finished in seventh place. At the Yamaha Indy 400 at California Speedway, Lazier started in 26th place and again finished in seventh place. At the next race, the Firestone Indy 225 at Nazareth, Lazier started in sixth place and was involved in a crash with Sam Hornish Jr. – who continued several laps down – on lap 38 in turn 3 and was scored in 23rd place. At the Indianapolis 500, Lazier qualified in twentieth place. In the race, Lazier began to move into the top-ten and with twelve laps remaining Lazier was running in sixth place, on the lead lap. On lap 199 in the second turn, the lapped car of Laurent Rédon lost control and collected Lazier. At the same time Paul Tracy was attempting to pass Hélio Castroneves for the lead in turn 3. Tracy passed Castroneves just after the crash and was the first car to cross the finish line. Indy Racing League officials declared that the pass occurred after the crash and Castroneves was the winner. Tracy's team, Team Green, protested by saying that the caution light was not displayed until after the pass occurred. The original results stood with Lazier finishing in fifteenth place.

At the following race, the Boomtown 500 at Texas, Lazier started in tenth place and finished in 8th place. At the Radisson Indy 225 at Pikes Peak, Lazier started in 10th place and finished in fifteenth place, three laps down. Lazier then finished in eighteenth place at Richmond due to a fire breaking out on his car after completing 91 laps having started in fifth place. At Kansas, Lazier started in fifth place and finishing in seventh place. At the Firestone Indy 200 at Nashville, Lazier started and finished in twelfth place due to a crash on lap 182 in turn 2. At the next race, the Michigan Indy 400 at Michigan, Lazier started in fifteenth place and finished in thirteenth place, two laps down. Lazier then finished in third place at the Belterra Casino Indy 300 at Kentucky after starting in third place and leading for three laps, the only laps that Lazier led during the season. At Gateway, Lazier started in eighteenth place and finished in fifteenth place, nine laps down. At Chicagoland, Lazier started in 22nd place and finished in third place. At the season-ending Chevy 500 at Texas, Lazier started in twentieth place and finished in seventh place. Lazier finished in eighth place in the final championship standings with 305 points.

==== 2003 ====
In 2003, Lazier returned with Hemelgarn Racing to drive the No. 91 Dallara IR03-Chevrolet. At the season-opening Toyota Indy 300 at Homestead, Lazier withdrew from the race and missed his first IRL race since the 1996 Dura Lube 200. At the following race, the Purex Dial Indy 200 at Phoenix, Lazier started in fifteenth place and finished in eleventh place, two laps down. Lazier then started in seventeenth place and finished in nineteenth place at the Indy Japan 300 at Twin Ring Motegi due to an engine failure after completing 63 laps. At the Indianapolis 500 Lazier qualified in 21st place. Prior to the race the team gained additional sponsorship from Victory Brands. Lazier retired from the race after 171 laps due to an engine failure. At the Bombardier 500 at Texas, Lazier started in nineteenth place and finished in thirteenth place, four laps down. Lazier then got his only top-ten finish of the season with a tenth-place finish at the Honda Indy 225 at Pikes Peak. At Richmond, Lazier started and finished in twentieth place, six laps down.

At the following race, the Kansas Indy 300, Lazier started in 21st place and finished in thirteenth place, eight laps down. Lazier was running in the top-ten in the late stages at Nashville, when he spun on the main straightaway on lap 194. Lazier was able to drive back to his pit stall to change the tires on his car, but on lap 199, Lazier crashed in turn 2 and was credited with a fourteenth-place finish. Lazier then started in 21st at the Firestone Indy 400 at Michigan before finishing in twelfth place, four laps down. Lazier then finished eleventh place at the Emerson Indy 250 at Gateway. The team then gained sponsorship from Metabolife starting at Kentucky, where Lazier started in twentieth place and finished in sixteenth place, four laps down. Following Chicagoland, where Lazier finished one lap down in sixteenth place, Lazier was replaced by Richie Hearn for the final two races of the season, the Toyota Indy 400 at Fontana and the Chevy 500 at Texas. Lazier finished in nineteenth place in the final championship standings with 201 points.

==== 2004 ====
In 2004, Hemelgarn Racing was unable to acquire sponsorship for the entire season, leaving Lazier without a car to drive for the season. Lazier only competed in the Indianapolis 500. Lazier first practiced in the No. 24 Dallara IR03-Chevrolet for Dreyer & Reinbold Racing on May 21, two days before Bump Day. Felipe Giaffone had already qualified the team's primary car and Lazier was practicing for the team in both Giaffone's qualified car and also the team's back-up car in preparation for potentially attempting to qualify for the race. On Lazier's first day on the track, he was the fastest of the unqualified drivers with a speed of 215.513 mph (346.835 km/h). Hemelgarn Racing became the entrant of the car while Dreyer & Reinbold partnered with the team. The back-up car became the No. 91 Dallara IR03-Chevrolet and Lazier started in 28th place. In the race, Lazier moved through the field into the top-fifteen positions and was running in twelfth place when he retired after 164 laps due to a fuel system failure. Lazier finished in thirtieth place in the final championship standings with twelve points.

==== 2005 ====
In 2005, Lazier again did not have a full-time team to drive for. Lazier drove for Panther Racing at the Indianapolis 500 in the No. 95 Dallara IR03-Chevrolet. Lazier qualified for the race in ninth place, beating Panther Racing's two full-time drivers Tomáš Enge and Tomas Scheckter. On the final day of practice before the race, Carb Day, Lazier crashed in turn 4 and slid along the outside wall on the main straightaway. Lazier was not injured in the crash and the car was repaired by race day. Prior to the race the team acquired Jiffy Lube as an additional primary sponsor on the car. Lazier ran in the top-ten for most of the race, despite Scott Sharp making contact with Lazier's car earlier in the race, damaging the front wing. Lazier continued in the race and passed Sébastien Bourdais for fifth place, just before Bourdais crashed out of the race.

With Lazier's Indianapolis performance, Panther Racing fielded an additional car for Lazier in four races. Lazier drove the same car he drove at Indianapolis, with sponsorship from Pennzoil, Jonathan Byrd's Cafeteria and the American Sentry Guard. At Nashville, Lazier started in third place and finished in ninth place. Lazier then competed in the following race, the ABC Supply Company A. J. Foyt 225 at the Milwaukee Mile, after teammate Enge was injured at Nashville. Lazier drove the No. 2 Dallara IR05-Chevrolet. In the race, Lazier started in fifth place and was scored in 18th place after crashing out after 129 laps. Lazier returned to the No. 95 at Michigan, where he started and finished in sixth place. Lazier then started in eighth place and finished in sixth place at the following race, the AMBER Alert Portal Indy 300 at Kentucky. The final race that Lazier contested in the 2005 season was the Peak Antifreeze Indy 300 at Chicagoland. In the race, Lazier started in seventh place and finished in tenth place. Lazier finished in 23rd place in the final championship standings with 140 points. Following the season, Panther downsized to one car for the 2006 season due to their engine supplier, Chevrolet, and their sponsor, Pennzoil, leaving the series at the end of the 2005 season.

==== 2006 ====
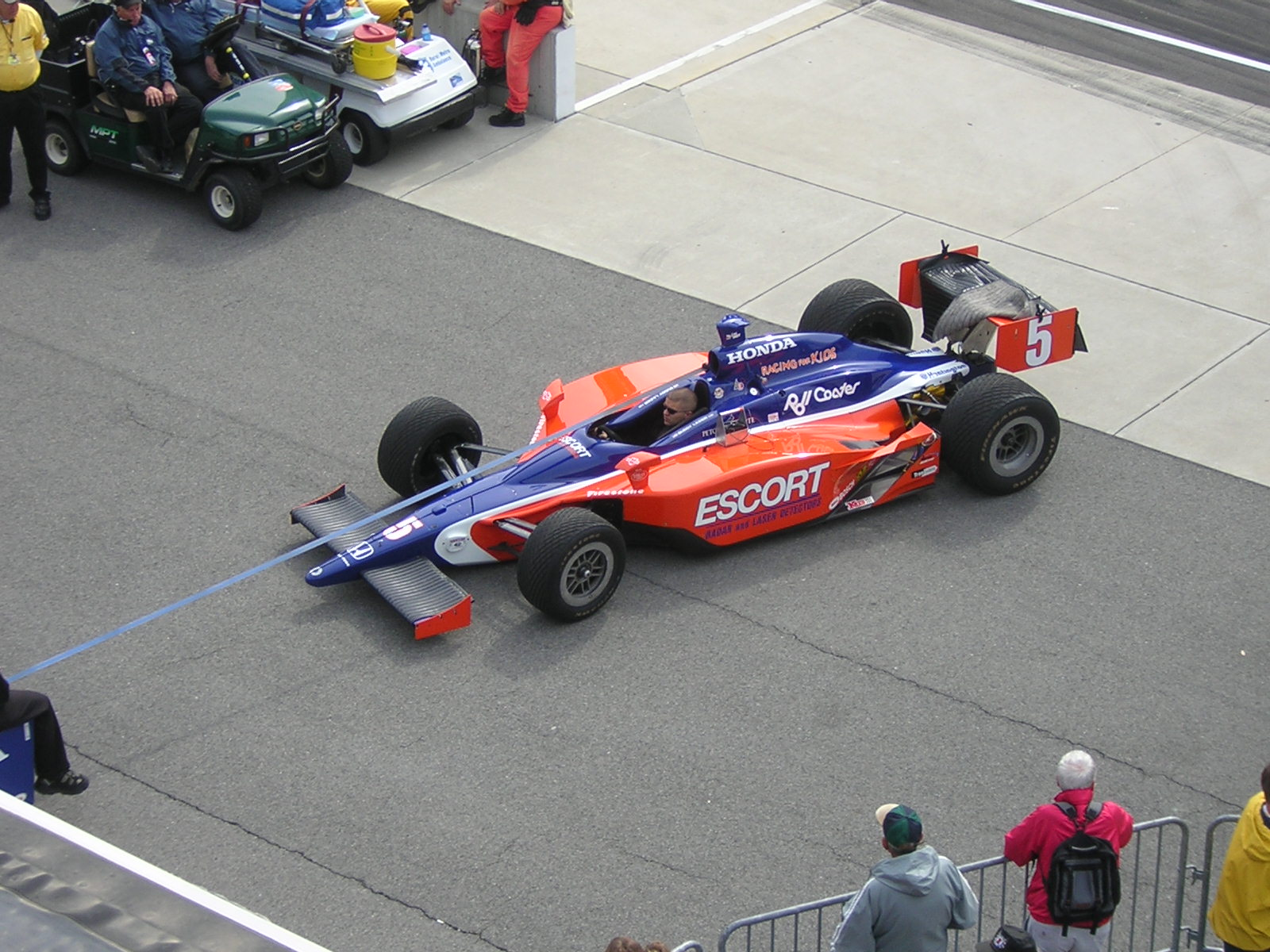
Lazier's car in Gasoline Alley during practice for the 2006 Indianapolis 500

In 2006, Lazier returned to Dreyer & Reinbold Racing after practicing for the team at the 2004 Indianapolis 500. Lazier drove the No. 5 Dallara IR03-Honda. Lazier attempted to compete in his first full-time season since 2002. At the season-opening Toyota Indy 300 at Homestead, Lazier started in fourteenth place. The race weekend was overshadowed by the death of Paul Dana in final practice; Lazier retired after twelve laps due to an electrical problem, and was scored in fourteenth. Lazier competed in his first non-oval race at the Honda Grand Prix of St. Petersburg. Lazier started in 18th place and was scored in fourteenth place due to a brake problem after completing 59 laps. At Motegi, Lazier started in 15th place and finished in fourteenth place, five laps down. At the Indianapolis 500, Lazier qualified in 25th place. Lazier was running in the top-ten in the second half of the race, but had to make a late-race pit stop to have enough fuel to finish the race and he finished in twelfth place, one lap down; his best result of the season.

Lazier was then replaced by Ryan Briscoe for the following race, the Watkins Glen Indy Grand Prix at the Watkins Glen International road course. Lazier returned to the team at the following race, the Bombardier Learjet 500 at Texas. Lazier started in 15th place but retired due to a fuel pump failure after 56 laps. Lazier started in nineteenth place at Richmond and finished in sixteenth place, five laps down. Lazier scored his best start of the season at the Kansas Lottery Indy 300 at Kansas with a seventh place start. Lazier finished in fifteenth place, six laps down. Lazier was then replaced by Briscoe for the next two races before returning at Michigan. Lazier started and finished in fifteenth place, two laps down. For the remainder of the season Briscoe and Sarah Fisher drove the car, which resulted in Lazier finishing in eighteenth place in the final championship standings with 122 points.

==== 2007–11 ====
For 2007, Lazier had no team to drive for the entire season. Lazier drove for Sam Schmidt Motorsports, a team owned by Lazier's former competitor Sam Schmidt, at the Indianapolis 500. Lazier drove the No. 99 Dallara IR05-Honda. Lazier qualified for the race on the second day of qualifying in 22nd place. Lazier had been bumped from the field earlier in the day by Buddy Rice and later bumped Jon Herb from the field. Towards the end of the qualifying day, Lazier's brother Jaques Lazier attempted to qualify for the race, but his speed was too slow and he was waved off. In the race, Lazier ran in the middle of the field and was never in contention for a top-ten finish. Lazier finished in nineteenth place, two laps down, in the rain-shortened race. Indianapolis was the only race that Lazier competed in during the season and he finished in 28th place in the final championship standings with twelve points.

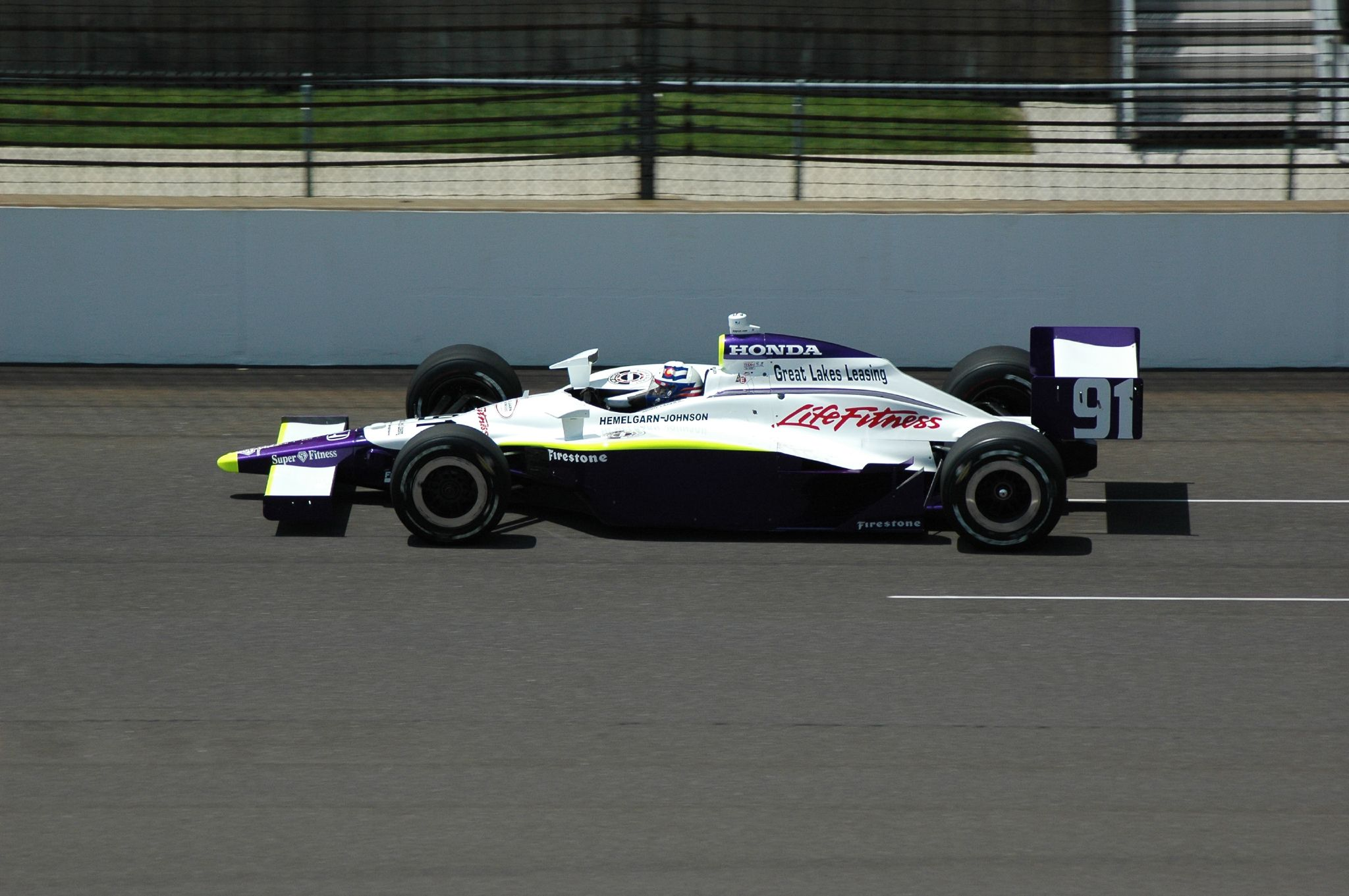
Lazier practicing for the 2008 Indianapolis 500

In 2008, Lazier returned to Hemelgarn-Johnson Racing for the Indianapolis 500 only, in the No. 91 Dallara IR05-Honda. Lazier qualified for the race on the third day of qualifying in 32nd place with a speed of 217.939 mph (350.739 km/h). On Bump Day, A. J. Foyt IV bumped Marty Roth from the field, but Roth would requalify and bumped Lazier from the field. In the final half-hour of the day, Lazier attempted to requalify for the race, but his speed was too slow and his team waved off the attempt after three laps. Dan Wheldon, who had qualified in 2nd place, and his Chip Ganassi Racing team helped Lazier with set up information. With about thirteen minutes left in qualifying, Lazier made another attempt and qualified for the race, in 32nd place, at a speed of 219.015 mph (352.470 km/h), bumping Mario Domínguez from the field. After qualifying, the team received primary sponsorship from LifeLock after Max Papis failed to qualify for the race in a car sponsored by the company. On lap 169 in the race, Lazier and Milka Duno made contact in turn 3 and Duno spun into the warm-up lane. Lazier finished the race in seventeenth place, five laps down. Lazier finished the season in 37th place in the final championship standings with thirteen points.

For 2009, Lazier returned with Hemelgarn-Johnson Racing to drive the No. 91 Dallara IR05-Honda. Lazier began practicing on May 14 in preparation for attempting to qualify on the second and final weekend of qualifying. On the third day of qualifying, Lazier posted a qualifying speed of 216.487 mph (348.402 km/h). Later in the day, Milka Duno bumped Lazier from the field with a speed of 218.040 mph (350.901 km/h). Lazier made a second qualifying attempt on Bump Day. Lazier failed to reach 219 mph (352 km/h) and his team waved off his attempt. Lazier's car was put into the qualifying line late in the day for another attempt, but qualifying ended while Ryan Hunter-Reay was on his qualifying attempt and Alex Tagliani was in line ahead of Lazier. Lazier failed to qualify for his first Indianapolis 500 since 1994.

In 2010, Lazier was without a car to drive for the season after Hemelgarn Racing closed in April. Lazier attempted to find a car to drive for at the Indianapolis 500, but ultimately was unable to do so. As a result, Lazier did not contest any part of the Indianapolis 500 for the first time since 1988. In 2011, Lazier was reported to be in line for a drive at the Indianapolis 500 for Dragon Racing. Dragon Racing opted to run Ho-Pin Tung and Scott Speed, with Speed later being replaced by Patrick Carpentier. For the second year in a row, Lazier did not attempt to qualify for the Indianapolis 500.

==== 2013–15 ====
Lazier returned to the IndyCar Series after a three-year absence in 2013 when on May 8, Lazier's father, Bob Lazier, formed a team called Lazier Partners Racing with Corbet Krause, Chris Nielsen and Jason Peters. The team purchased a Dallara DW12 chassis from Fan Force United for $250,000. The chassis needed to be modified to have a Chevrolet engine placed into it. Lazier originally drove the car with no sponsorship and the paint scheme remained the same as when Fan Force United fielded the car, albeit with orange replacing the original gold stripes. Lazier first practiced on May 16, completing only installation laps. Lazier took his refresher test the next day and was quickly practicing at speeds greater than 219 mph (352 km/h). On Pole Day, the team gained sponsorship from Advance Auto Parts and Lazier posted a qualifying speed of 223.073 mph (359.001 km/h), failing to make the race on Pole Day. On Bump Day, Lazier qualified for the race in 32nd place with a speed of 223.442 mph (359.595 km/h). Lazier officially drove the car as the No. 91 entry, with Spirit of Oklahoma added to the car after the tornados in Moore, Oklahoma on May 20 as a sign of respect for the victims. Lazier retired from the race after completing 44 laps due to mechanical problems. Lazier only competed at Indianapolis and was ranked in 38th place in the final championship standings with eight points.

For 2014, Lazier returned with Lazier Partners Racing to drive the No. 91 Dallara-Chevrolet at the Indianapolis 500. Lazier did not practice until May 15. On the first day of qualifying, Lazier posted a speed of 226.543 mph (364.586 km/h) and had the 33rd-fastest speed. On Pole Day, Lazier qualified for the race with a speed of 227.920 mph (366.802 km/h) and started in 33rd place. On the first lap of the race, Lazier narrowly avoided Ryan Briscoe, who had nearly spun coming off turn 2. Lazier completed 87 laps before retiring due to clutch problems, and was scored in 32nd place. By starting the race, Lazier joined Tom Sneva and Roger McCluskey in a tie for tenth place for the most Indianapolis 500 starts with eighteen. Lazier also moved into seventh place for the most laps completed, with 2,797. Lazier only competed at Indianapolis and ultimately finished in 35th place in the final standings with eleven points.

In 2015, Lazier returned with Lazier Partners Racing to drive the No. 91 Dallara-Chevrolet at the Indianapolis 500. Lazier used using Chevrolet's new aero kit on the car. Lazier first practiced on May 14, completing 28 laps prior to Pole Day. The car then suffered gearbox issues prior to qualifying and Lazier was unable to make an attempt to qualify in the original line, but was repaired in time for the Last Row Shootout. The speed of Lazier's first qualifying attempt was 219.438 mph (353.151 km/h), compared to Bryan Clauson's next-slowest speed of 221.358 mph (356.241 km/h). Lazier's pit crew made wing adjustments to reduce the car's downforce. Lazier improved to a speed of 220.153 mph (354.302 km/h), but ultimately ran out of time and failed to qualify.

=== Grand-Am Rolex Sports Car Series ===
In 2001, Lazier competed in the Grand-Am Rolex Sports Car Series. Lazier drove the No. 74 Riley & Scott Mk III-Judd with Jack Baldwin, George Robinson and Irv Hoerr for Robinson Racing in the Sport Racing Prototype (SR) class. Lazier only competed with the team at the season-opening Rolex 24 at Daytona. The car started in 2nd place overall and led ten laps during the race. The car then suffered an engine failure after completing 563 laps; the car was classified in fifth place in its class and 22nd place overall. Lazier finished in 35th place in the final championship standings with 29 points.

=== International Race of Champions ===
In 2001, Lazier competed in the International Race of Champions as a representative of the Indy Racing Northern Light Series, with Eddie Cheever, Mark Dismore and Scott Goodyear – latterly replaced by Al Unser Jr. for the final two races of the season due to injuries received at the Indianapolis 500 – also representing the series. Lazier, as with the other drivers, drove a Pontiac Firebird Trans Am. At the season-opening race at Daytona International Speedway, Lazier started in eighth place and finished in eleventh place due to a crash on lap 27 with Jeff Burton. At the following race at Talladega Superspeedway, Lazier started and finished in third place. At the third race of the season at Michigan International Speedway, Lazier started in seventh place and finished in sixth place. At the final race of the season at the Indianapolis Motor Speedway, Lazier started in fourth place and finished in eleventh place due to another crash with Burton, who had led every lap in the race up to that point. Lazier finished in ninth place in the final championship standings with 31 points, earning $40,000 for his efforts.

Lazier returned to the series in 2002, with Sam Hornish Jr., Scott Sharp and Unser Jr. joining him from the IRL. At the season-opening race at Daytona, Lazier started in seventh place and finished in tenth place. At the second race of the season, at California Speedway, Lazier started in third place and finished in ninth place. At the following race at Chicagoland Speedway, Lazier qualified on pole position, and led flag-to-flag. At the final race of the season at Indianapolis, Lazier started in eighth place and finished in fourth place. As a result, Lazier finished in second place in the final standings with 49 points, five points behind champion Kevin Harvick.

=== NASCAR Craftsman Truck Series ===
Later in his career, Lazier participated in NASCAR for a brief time. In 2005, Lazier tested a Chevrolet Silverado for Billy Ballew Motorsports at Lowe's Motor Speedway. In 2007, Lazier returned to drive for Billy Ballew Motorsports in the No. 15 Chevrolet Silverado at the Smith's Las Vegas 350 at Las Vegas Motor Speedway. Lazier said of the opportunity, "The opportunity arose for us to race in Las Vegas and I am extremely excited. They are racers on that team and to me it's a perfect fit, and I feel right at home with the whole team." Lazier started in 21st place and finished in 24th place, three laps down.

== Media appearances ==
=== Television ===
After winning the Indianapolis 500, Lazier made a guest appearance on Late Night with Conan O'Brien. The episode that Lazier appeared on aired on May 29, 1996.

Lazier was nominated for the Best Driver ESPY Award in 2001 against Bobby Labonte, John Force and Gil de Ferran.

== Personal life ==
Lazier was born in and currently resides in Vail, Colorado. According to his father Bob, Buddy was born on Halloween night at Loveland Pass after his father's 1963 Corvette broke down on the way to the hospital. Lazier is married to Kara, and the couple have two children: a son, Flinn, and a daughter, Jacqueline.

Lazier's father Bob Lazier was a former racing driver who won the CART Rookie of the Year Award in 1981. Lazier's brother, Jaques Lazier, competed in the Indy Racing League from 1998 to 2010, winning the 2001 Delphi Indy 200 at Chicagoland Speedway. With both drivers having won races, they are the only brothers to have both won races in that series.

Lazier and his relatives operate the Tivoli Lodge in Vail, Colorado, which his father opened in 1968.

== Motorsports career results ==
=== American open–wheel racing results ===
(key) (Races in bold indicate pole position)

==== CART ====
Year	Team	No.	Chassis	Engine	1	2	3	4	5	6	7	8	9	10	11	12	13	14	15	16	17	Rank	Points	Ref
1989	Lazier Racing	35	March 87C	Cosworth DFX	PHX	LBH	INDY; DNQ	MIL	DET	POR	CLE	MEA	TOR	MCH	POC	MOH	ROA	NAZ				NC	–	
1989	Gary Trout Motorsports	23	March 87C	Cosworth DFX															LAG; DNQ			NC	–	
1990	Hemelgarn Racing	91	Lola T88/00	Buick 3300 V6	PHX	LBH	INDY; DNQ															**30th**	**1**	
1990	Hemelgarn Racing	71	Lola T88/00	Buick 3300 V6				MIL	DET; DNQ	POR; 13	CLE; 24	MEA	TOR; DNS		DEN; DNQ	VAN; 12	MOH; 23	ROA; DNS	NAZ; 14	LAG		**30th**	**1**	
1990	Arciero Racing	24	Penske PC17	Buick 3300 V6										MCH; 26								**30th**	**1**	
1991	Dale Coyne Racing	90	Lola T88/00	Cosworth DFX	SRF; 25																	**22nd**	**6**	
1991	Dale Coyne Racing	90	Lola T90/00	Cosworth DFS					MIL; DNQ	DET; 18	POR								ROA; 24	NAZ		**22nd**	**6**	
1991	Dale Coyne Racing	19	Lola T90/00	Cosworth DFS								CLE; 11	MEA									**22nd**	**6**	
1991	Todd Walther Racing	44	Lola T89/00	Cosworth DFS		LBH; 25	PHX															**22nd**	**6**	
1991	Hemelgarn Racing	71	Lola T90/00	Buick 3300 V6				INDY; 33														**22nd**	**6**	
1991	Hemelgarn Coyne Racing	39	Lola T90/00	Cosworth DFS										TOR; 22	MCH	DEN; 9	VAN				LAG; 22	**22nd**	**6**	
1991	Walker Racing	10	Lola T90/00	Cosworth DFS														MOH; 24				**22nd**	**6**	
1992	Leader Card Racing	21	Lola T90/00	Buick 3300 V6	SRF; 16	PHX; 14	LBH; 12		DET; 24	POR; 25	MIL; 17	NHA										**19th**	**10**	
1992	Leader Card Racing	21	Lola T91/00	Buick 3300 V6				INDY; 14					TOR; 15	MCH; 7					NAZ; 15			**19th**	**10**	
1992	Leader Card Racing	21	Lola T91/00	Ilmor-Chevrolet Indy V8 265A											CLE; 23	ROA; 13	VAN; 10	MOH; 22		LAG; 21		**19th**	**10**	
1993	Leader Card Racing	20	Lola T91/00	Ilmor-Chevrolet Indy V8 265A	SRF; 20	PHX; 17	LBH; 19			DET; 18	POR	CLE; 21	TOR									**38th**	**0**	
1993	Leader Card Racing	20	Lola T91/00	Buick 3300 V6				INDY; DNQ	MIL; 15							ROA; 14	VAN	MOH; 20	NAZ; 26	LAG; DNQ		**38th**	**0**	
1993	Leader Card Racing	20	Lola T92/00	Buick 3300 V6										MCH; 21	NHA; Wth							**38th**	**0**	
1994	Leader Card Racing	23	Lola T93/00	Ilmor Indy V8 265C	SRF; DNQ	PHX; 13	LBH; 29	INDY; DNQ	MIL; 18	DET; 17	POR; 24	CLE; Wth	TOR; DNS	MCH; 24	MOH; DNQ	NHA; DNS	VAN; 27	ROA	NAZ; DNQ	LAG		**36th**	**0**	
1994	Hemelgarn Racing	94	Lola T92/00	Buick 3300 V6				INDY; DNQ														**36th**	**0**	
1994	Dick Simon Racing	90	Lola T94/00	Ford Cosworth XB				INDY; DNQ														**36th**	**0**	
1995	Project Indy	64	Reynard 94i	Ford Cosworth XB	MIA	SRF; 21	PHX	LBH							TOR; 15	CLE						**35th**	**0**	
1995	Payton/Coyne Racing	19	Lola T94/00	Ford Cosworth XB					NAZ; 25								MCH; 14	MOH	NHA; 21	VAN	LAG	**35th**	**0**	
1995	Payton/Coyne Racing	19	Lola T95/00	Ford Cosworth XB							MIL; 18	DET	POR	ROA								**35th**	**0**	
1995	Team Menard	80	Lola T95/00	Menard Indy V6						INDY; 27												**35th**	**0**	
1995	Team Menard	80	Lola T93/00	Menard Indy V6						INDY; DNQ												**35th**	**0**	

==== IndyCar Series ====
Year	Team	No.	Chassis	Engine	1	2	3	4	5	6	7	8	9	10	11	12	13	14	15	16	17	18	19	Rank	Points	Ref
1996	Hemelgarn Racing	91	Reynard	Ford Cosworth	**WDW**; 17	PHX; Wth	INDY; 1																	14th	159	
1996–97	Hemelgarn Racing	91	Reynard	Ford Cosworth	NHA; 19	LVS; 24																		8th	209	
1996–97	Hemelgarn Racing	91	Dallara	Infiniti			WDW; 5	PHX; 21																8th	209	
1996–97	Hemelgarn Racing	91	Dallara	Oldsmobile					INDY; 4	TXS; 17	PPIR; 8	CLT; 1	NHA; 12	LVS; 31										8th	209	
1998	Hemelgarn Racing	91	Dallara	Oldsmobile	WDW; 15	PHX; 28	INDY; 2	TXS; 11	NHA; 7	DOV; 2	CLT; 13	PPIR; 7	ATL; 17	TXS; 6	LVS; 3									5th	262	
1999	Hemelgarn Racing	91	Dallara	Oldsmobile	WDW; 10	PHX; 18	CLT^{1} C	INDY; 7	TXS; 14	PPIR; 5	ATL; 21	DOV; 2	PPIR; 4	LVS; 11	TXS; 10									6th	224	
2000	Hemelgarn Racing	91	Riley & Scott	Oldsmobile	WDW; 2	PHX; 1	LVS; 22																	1st	290	
2000	Hemelgarn Racing	91	Dallara	Oldsmobile				INDY; 2	**TXS**; 7	PPIR; 26	ATL; 2	KTY; 1	TXS; 4											1st	290	
2001	Hemelgarn Racing	91	Dallara	Oldsmobile	PHX; 3	HMS; 20	ATL; 6	INDY; 18	TXS; 4	PPIR; 1	RIR; 1	KAN; 5	NSH; 1	KTY; 1	GTW; 13	CHI; 11	TXS; 17							2nd	398	
2002	Hemelgarn Racing	91	Dallara	Chevrolet	HMS; 22	PHX; 7	FON; 7	NAZ; 23	INDY; 15	TXS; 8	PPIR; 15	RIR; 18	KAN; 7	NSH; 12	MIS; 13	KTY; 3	GTW; 15	CHI; 3	TXS; 7					8th	305	
2003	Hemelgarn Racing	91	Dallara	Chevrolet	HMS	PHX; 11	MOT; 19	INDY; 21	TXS; 13	PPIR; 10	RIR; 20	KAN; 13	NSH; 14	MIS; 12	GTW; 11	KTY; 16	NAZ; 13	CHI; 16	FON	TXS				19th	201	
2004	Dreyer & Reinbold with Hemelgarn	91	Dallara	Chevrolet	HMS	PHX	MOT	INDY; 23	TXS	RIR	KAN	NSH	MIL	MIS	KTY	PPIR	NAZ	CHI	FON	TXS				33rd	12	
2005	Panther Racing	95	Dallara	Chevrolet	HMS	PHX	STP	MOT	INDY; 5	TXS	RIR	KAN	NSH; 9		MIS; 6	KTY; 6	PPIR	SNM	CHI; 10	WGL	FON			23rd	140	
2005	Panther Racing	2	Dallara	Chevrolet										MIL; 18										23rd	140	
2006	Dreyer & Reinbold Racing	5	Dallara	Honda	HMS; 14	STP; 14	MOT; 14	INDY; 12	WGL	TXS; 19	RIR; 16	KAN; 15	NSH	MIL	MIS; 15	KTY	SNM	CHI						18th	122	
2007	Sam Schmidt Motorsports	99	Dallara	Honda	HMS	STP	MOT	KAN	INDY; 19	MIL	TXS	IOW	RIR	WGL	NSH	MOH	MIS	KTY	SNM	DET	CHI			28th	12	
2008	Hemelgarn-Johnson Racing	91	Dallara	Honda	HMS	STP	MOT^{1}	LBH^{1}	KAN	INDY; 17	MIL	TXS	IOW	RIR	WGL	NSH	MOH	EDM	KTY	SNM	DET	CHI	SRF^{2}	37th	13	
2009	Hemelgarn-Johnson Racing	91	Dallara	Honda	STP	LBH	KAN	INDY; DNQ	MIL	TXS	IOW	RIR	WGL	TOR	EDM	KTY	MOH	SNM	CHI	MOT	HMS			NC	–	
2013	Lazier Partners Racing	91	Dallara DW12	Chevrolet	STP	ALA	LBH	SAO	INDY; 31	DET	DET	TXS	MIL	IOW	POC	TOR	TOR	MOH	SNM	BAL	HOU	HOU	FON	38th	8	
2014	Lazier Partners Racing	91	Dallara DW12	Chevrolet	STP	LBH	ALA	IMS	INDY; 32	DET	DET	TXS	HOU	HOU	POC	IOW	TOR	TOR	MOH	MIL	SNM	FON		35th	11	
2015	Lazier Partners Racing	91	Dallara DW12	Chevrolet	STP	NLA	LBH	ALA	IMS	INDY; DNQ	DET	DET	TXS	TOR	FON	MIL	IOW	MOH	POC	SNM				NC	–	
2016	Lazier Burns Racing	4	Dallara DW12	Chevrolet	STP	PHX	LBH	ALA	IMS	INDY; 30	DET	DET	RDA	IOW	TOR	MOH	POC	TXS	WGL	SNM				35th	12	
2017	Lazier Partners Racing	44	Dallara DW12	Chevrolet	STP	LBH	ALA	PHX	IMS	INDY; 29	DET	DET	TXS	ROA	IOW	TOR	MOH	POC	GTW	WGL	SNM			37th	14	

* Season still in progress.

^{1} Run on same day.
^{2} Non-points-paying, exhibition race.

==== Indianapolis 500 ====
Year	Chassis	Engine	Start	Finish	Team
1989	March 87C	Cosworth DFX	DNQ		Lazier Racing
1990	Lola T88/00	Buick 3300 V6	DNQ		Hemelgarn Racing
1991	Lola T90/00	Buick 3300 V6	23	33	Hemelgarn Racing
1992	Lola T91/00	Buick 3300 V6	24	14	Leader Card Racing
1993	Lola T92/00	Buick 3300 V6	DNQ		Leader Card Racing
1994	Lola T93/00	Ilmor Indy V8 265C	DNQ		Leader Card Racing
1994	Lola T92/00	Buick 3300 V6	DNQ		Hemelgarn Racing
1994	Lola T94/00	Ford Cosworth XB	DNQ		Dick Simon Racing
1995	Lola T95/00	Menard Indy V6	23	27	Team Menard
1996	Reynard 95i	Ford Cosworth XB	5	**1**	Hemelgarn Racing
1997	Dallara IR7	Oldsmobile Aurora L47 V8	10	4	Hemelgarn Racing
1998	Dallara IR8	Oldsmobile Aurora L47 V8	11	2	Hemelgarn Racing
1999	Dallara IR9	Oldsmobile Aurora L47 V8	22	7	Hemelgarn Racing
2000	Dallara IR00	Oldsmobile Aurora L47 V8	16	2	Hemelgarn Racing
2000	Riley & Scott Mk VII	Oldsmobile Aurora L47 V8	DNQ		Hemelgarn Racing
2001	Dallara IR01	Oldsmobile Aurora L47 V8	10	18	Hemelgarn Racing
2002	Dallara IR02	Chevrolet V8	20	15	Hemelgarn Racing
2003	Dallara IR03	Chevrolet V8	21	21	Hemelgarn Racing
2004	Dallara IR03	Chevrolet V8	28	23	Hemelgarn Racing
2005	Dallara IR03	Chevrolet V8	9	5	Panther Racing
2006	Dallara IR03	Ilmor-Honda Indy V8 HI4R	25	12	Dreyer & Reinbold Racing
2007	Dallara IR05	Ilmor-Honda Indy V8 HI7R	22	19	Sam Schmidt Motorsports
2008	Dallara IR05	Ilmor-Honda Indy V8 HI7R	32	17	Hemelgarn-Johnson Racing
2009	Dallara IR05	Ilmor-Honda Indy V8 HI7R	DNQ		Hemelgarn-Johnson Racing
2013	Dallara DW12	Ilmor-Chevrolet Indy V6	32	31	Lazier Partners Racing
2014	Dallara DW12	Ilmor-Chevrolet Indy V6	33	32	Lazier Partners Racing
2015	Dallara DW12	Ilmor-Chevrolet Indy V6	DNQ		Lazier Partners Racing
2016	Dallara DW12	Ilmor-Chevrolet Indy V6	32	30	Lazier Burns Racing
2017	Dallara DW12	Ilmor-Chevrolet Indy V6	30	29	Lazier Partners Racing

=== NASCAR ===
(key) (Bold – Pole position awarded by qualifying time. Italics – Pole position earned by points standings or practice time. * – Most laps led.)

==== Craftsman Truck Series ====
NASCAR Craftsman Truck Series results
Year	Team	No.	Make	1	2	3	4	5	6	7	8	9	10	11	12	13	14	15	16	17	18	19	20	21	22	23	24	25	NCTC	Pts	Ref
2007	Billy Ballew Motorsports	15	Chevy	DAY	CAL	ATL	MAR	KAN	CLT	MFD	DOV	TEX	MCH	MLW	MEM	KEN	IRP	NSH	BRI	GTW	NHA	LVS; 24	TAL	MAR	ATL	TEX	PHO	HOM	93rd	91	

=== International Race of Champions ===
(key) (Bold – Pole position. * – Most laps led.)

International Race of Champions results
Year	Make	1	2	3	4	Pos.	Points	Ref
2001	Pontiac	DAY; 11	TAL; 3	MCH; 6	IND; 11	9th	31	
2002	Pontiac	DAY; 10	CAL; 9	**CHI**; 1*	IND; 4	2nd	49	

Sporting positions
Preceded by None	American Indycar Series Champion; 1988	Succeeded by Robby Unser
Preceded by Greg Ray	Verizon IndyCar Series Champion; 2000	Succeeded by Sam Hornish Jr.
Achievements
Preceded by Jacques Villeneuve	Indianapolis 500 Winner; 1996	Succeeded by Arie Luyendyk
Awards
Preceded by Arie Luyendyk	Scott Brayton Award; 2003	Succeeded by Hélio Castroneves
