= IROC XXIX =

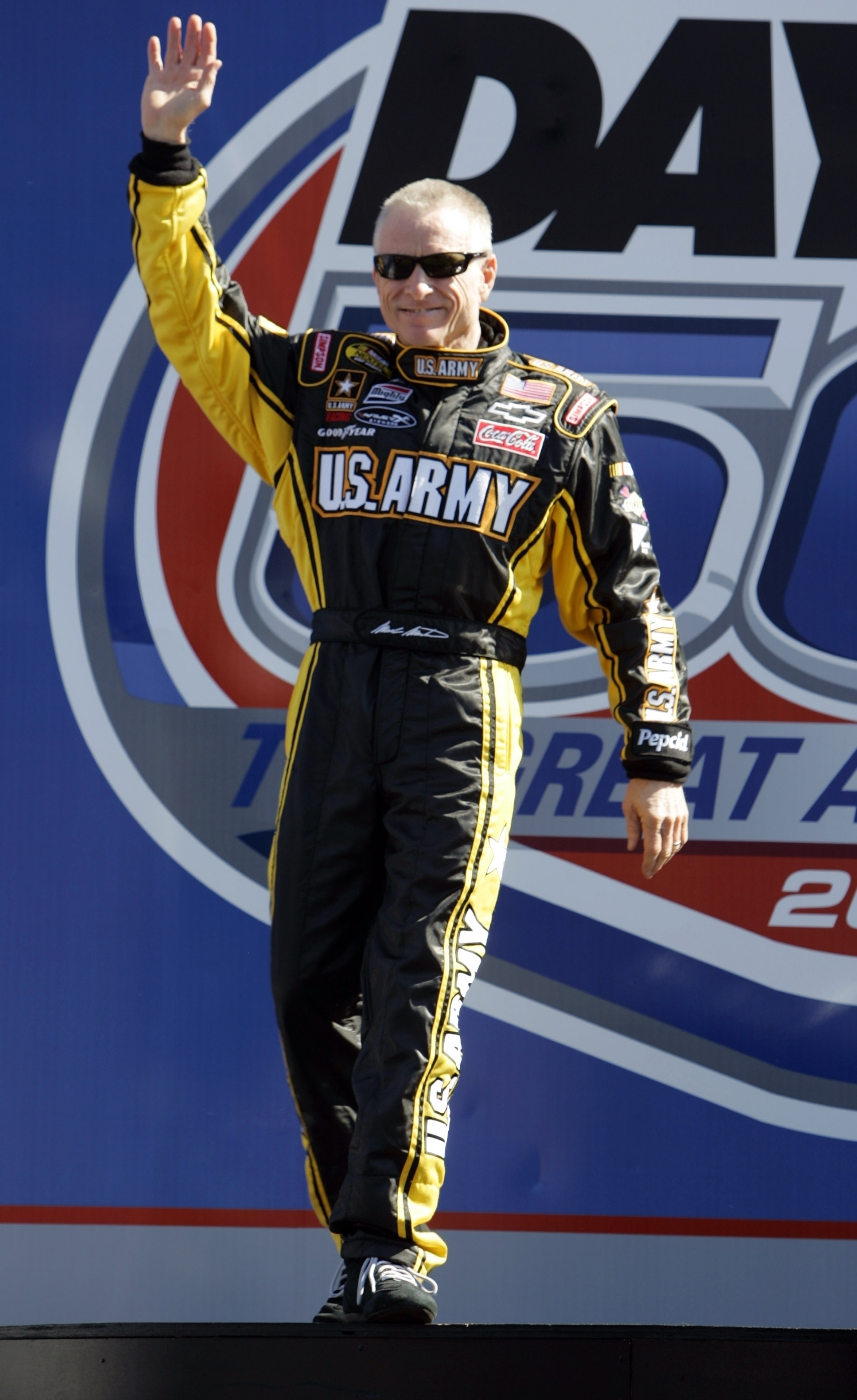
Mark Martin (seen in 2007), the IROC XXIX champion

IROC XXIX was the 29th season of the Crown Royal International Race of Champions, which began on Friday February 12, 2005 at Daytona International Speedway. The all-star roster included twelve drivers from eight premier racing series. Mark Martin dominated the season, winning two races and finishing well ahead in the points standings, earning him a record-setting fifth IROC title. As with IROC XXVIII, the drivers used their car colors and numbers from their native series (when feasible).

== Drivers ==
Car Number	Driver	Series
01	(United States) Scott Pruett	Grand-Am Rolex Sports Car
2	(France) Sébastien Bourdais	Champ Car World Series
03	(Brazil) Hélio Castroneves	Indy Racing League
4	(United States) Bobby Hamilton	NASCAR Craftsman Truck Series
6	(United States) Mark Martin	NASCAR Nextel Cup Series
8	(United States) Martin Truex Jr.	NASCAR Busch Series
11	(United States) Steve Kinser	World of Outlaws
15	(United States) Buddy Rice	Indy Racing League
16	(Italy) Max Papis	Grand-Am Rolex Sports Car
17	(United States) Matt Kenseth	NASCAR Nextel Cup Series
20	(United States) Danny Lasoski	World of Outlaws
97	(United States) Kurt Busch	NASCAR Nextel Cup Series

== Race One (Daytona International Speedway) ==
1. 6- Mark Martin
2. 8- Martin Truex Jr.
3. 4- Bobby Hamilton
4. 17- Matt Kenseth
5. 15- Buddy Rice
6. 16- Max Papis
7. 20- Danny Lasoski
8. 03- Hélio Castroneves
9. 97- Kurt Busch
10. 01- Scott Pruett
11. 11- Steve Kinser
12. 2- Sébastien Bourdais

== Race Two (Texas Motor Speedway) ==
1. 2- Sébastien Bourdais
2. 6- Mark Martin
3. 15- Buddy Rice
4. 8- Martin Truex Jr.
5. 4- Bobby Hamilton
6. 16- Max Papis
7. 20- Danny Lasoski
8. 11- Steve Kinser
9. 17- Matt Kenseth
10. 03- Hélio Castroneves
11. 97- Kurt Busch
12. 01- Scott Pruett

== Race Three (Richmond International Raceway) ==
1. 6- Mark Martin
2. 97- Kurt Busch
3. 17- Matt Kenseth
4. 15- Buddy Rice
5. 8- Martin Truex Jr.
6. 01- Scott Pruett
7. 20- Danny Lasoski
8. 11- Steve Kinser
9. 16- Max Papis
10. 2- Sébastien Bourdais
11. 03- Hélio Castroneves
12. 4- Bobby Hamilton

== Race Four (Atlanta Motor Speedway) ==
1. 8- Martin Truex Jr.
2. 6- Mark Martin
3. 17- Matt Kenseth
4. 03- Hélio Castroneves
5. 20- Danny Lasoski
6. 2- Sébastien Bourdais
7. 15- Buddy Rice
8. 11- Steve Kinser
9. 16- Max Papis
10. 4- Bobby Hamilton
11. 01- Scott Pruett
12. 97- Kurt Busch

== Standings ==
Pos.	Driver	DAY	TEX	RCH	ATL	Pts
1	(United States) Mark Martin	1	2	1	2	89
2	(United States) Martin Truex Jr.	2	4	5	1	68
3	(United States) Matt Kenseth	4	9	3	3	55
4	(United States) Buddy Rice	5	3	4	7	46
5	(France) Sébastien Bourdais	12	1	10	6	46
6	(United States) Kurt Busch	9	11	2	12	43
7	(United States) Bobby Hamilton	3	5	12	10	34
8	(United States) Danny Lasoski	7	7	7	5	34
9	(Brazil) Hélio Castroneves	8	10	11	4	32
10	(Italy) Max Papis	6	6	9	9	30
11	(United States) Steve Kinser	11	8	8	8	29
12	(United States) Scott Pruett	10	12	6	11	22
