= IROC XXX =

IROC season

IROC XXX was the 30th season of the Crown Royal International Race of Champions, which began on Friday, February 17, 2006 at Daytona International Speedway. The all-star roster included thirteen drivers (in twelve cars) from seven premier racing series. Tony Stewart consistently ran up front and won two races to win the championship, ahead of the equally consistent Matt Kenseth by 12 points. As with the past two seasons, the drivers used their car colors and numbers from their native series (when feasible). This was also the first IROC season since 1991 to include a road course race (held on the Daytona International Speedway road course).

The roster of drivers and final points standings were as follows:

== Drivers ==
Tony Stewart, seen celebrating his Texas win, won the IROC XXX championship

| Car Number | Driver | Series |
|---|---|---|
| 1 | (United States) Ted Musgrave | NASCAR Craftsman Truck Series |
| 6 | (United States) Mark Martin | NASCAR Nextel Cup Series |
| 06 | (United States) Sam Hornish Jr. | Indy Racing League |
| 8 | (United States) Martin Truex Jr. | NASCAR Busch Series |
| 08 | (United States) Scott Sharp | Indy Racing League |
| 10 | (South Africa) Wayne Taylor 2 (Italy) Max Angelelli 2 | Grand-Am Rolex Sports Car |
| 11 | (United States) Steve Kinser | World of Outlaws |
| 12 | (United States) Ryan Newman | NASCAR Nextel Cup Series |
| 16 | (Italy) Max Papis | Grand-Am Rolex Sports Car |
| 17 | (United States) Matt Kenseth | NASCAR Nextel Cup Series |
| 20 | (United States) Tony Stewart | NASCAR Nextel Cup Series |
| 46 | (United States) Frank Kimmel | ARCA RE/MAX Series |

Note: Initially Carl Edwards was announced as a driver for the 2006 season. Due to a conflict with the NASCAR Busch Series race at Memphis International Raceway in October, Edwards withdrew from IROC and was replaced by Ryan Newman.

== Results ==
=== Race One (Daytona International Speedway oval) ===
1. 17- Matt Kenseth
2. 06- Sam Hornish Jr.
3. 46- Frank Kimmel
4. 16- Max Papis
5. 8- Martin Truex Jr.
6. 10- Wayne Taylor
7. 11- Steve Kinser
8. 20- Tony Stewart
9. 08- Scott Sharp
10. 1- Ted Musgrave
11. 12- Ryan Newman
12. 6- Mark Martin

=== Race Two (Texas Motor Speedway) ===
1. 20- Tony Stewart
2. 12- Ryan Newman
3. 8- Martin Truex Jr.
4. 6- Mark Martin
5. 17- Matt Kenseth
6. 10- Max Angelelli
7. 08- Scott Sharp
8. 46- Frank Kimmel
9. 1- Ted Musgrave
10. 16- Max Papis
11. 11- Steve Kinser
12. 06- Sam Hornish Jr.

=== Race Three (Daytona International Speedway road course) ===
1. 20- Tony Stewart
2. 16- Max Papis
3. 12- Ryan Newman
4. 08- Scott Sharp
5. 06- Sam Hornish Jr.
6. 8- Martin Truex Jr.
7. 10- Max Angelelli
8. 46- Frank Kimmel
9. 6- Mark Martin
10. 17-Matt Kenseth
11. 11- Steve Kinser
12. 1- Ted Musgrave

=== Race Four (Atlanta Motor Speedway) ===
1. 8- Martin Truex Jr.
2. 17- Matt Kenseth
3. 20- Tony Stewart
4. 12- Ryan Newman
5. 1- Ted Musgrave
6. 6- Mark Martin
7. 46- Frank Kimmel
8. 16- Max Papis
9. 06- Sam Hornish Jr.
10. 11- Steve Kinser
11. 10- Wayne Taylor
12. 08- Scott Sharp

== Standings ==
| Pos. | Driver | DAY | TEX | DAY | ATL | Pts |
|---|---|---|---|---|---|---|
| 1 | (United States) Tony Stewart | 8 | 1 | 1 | 3 | 77 |
| 2 | (United States) Matt Kenseth | 1 | 5 | 10 | 2 | 65 |
| 3 | (United States) Martin Truex Jr. | 5 | 3 | 6 | 1 | 57 |
| 4 | (United States) Ryan Newman | 11 | 2 | 3 | 4 | 54 |
| 5 | (United States) Mark Martin | 12 | 4 | 9 | 6 | 47 |
| 6 | (Italy) Max Papis | 4 | 10 | 2 | 8 | 46 |
| 7 | (United States) Frank Kimmel | 3 | 8 | 8 | 7 | 40 |
| 8 | (United States) Sam Hornish Jr. | 2 | 12 | 5 | 9 | 36 |
| 9 | (South Africa) Wayne Taylor | 6 | | | 11 | 30 |
| 9 | (Italy) Max Angelelli | | 6 | 7 | | 30 |
| 10 | (United States) Scott Sharp | 9 | 7 | 4 | 12 | 29 |
| 11 | (United States) Ted Musgrave | 10 | 9 | 12 | 5 | 24 |
| 12 | (United States) Steve Kinser | 7 | 11 | 11 | 10 | 21 |
