= IROC XXVII =

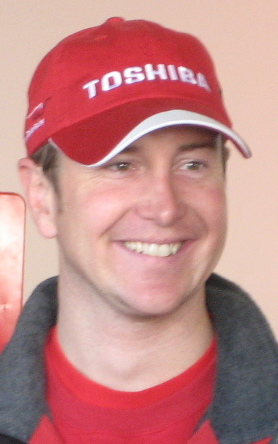
Kurt Busch (seen in 2008), the IROC XXVII champion

IROC XXVII was the 27th season of the Crown Royal International Race of Champions, which began on Friday, February 14, 2003 at Daytona International Speedway. The roster included 12 drivers from five separate racing leagues. Mark Martin won the first race to tie an IROC record 11 career wins, tying him with Al Unser Jr. and Dale Earnhardt. Rookie Kurt Busch won in only his second start in race 2 after finishing second at Daytona. At Chicagoland, Mike Bliss became the first driver representing the Craftsman Truck Series to win a race in IROC competition. Jimmie Johnson won the final race of the year for his first career IROC victory. Kurt Busch clinched the title with his fourth-place showing in the race, as Mark Martin and Mike Bliss, his closest competitors, finished fifth and tenth, respectively.

The roster of drivers and final points standings were as follows:

Position	Driver	Points	Series
1	(United States) Kurt Busch	69	NASCAR Winston Cup
2	(United States) Mark Martin	58	NASCAR Winston Cup
3	(United States) Jimmie Johnson	56	NASCAR Winston Cup
4	(United States) Mike Bliss	54	NASCAR Craftsman Truck Series
5	(United States) Kevin Harvick	48	NASCAR Winston Cup
6	(United States) Ryan Newman	48	NASCAR Winston Cup
7	(United States) Greg Biffle	41	NASCAR Busch Series
8	(United States) Sam Hornish Jr.	30	Indy Racing League
9	(United States) Danny Lasoski	27	World of Outlaws
10	(Brazil) Felipe Giaffone (United States) Scott Sharp	24	Indy Racing League
11	(United States) Steve Kinser	24	World of Outlaws
12	(Brazil) Hélio Castroneves	23	Indy Racing League

== Race One (Daytona International Speedway) ==
1. Mark Martin
2. Kurt Busch
3. Danny Lasoski
4. Jimmie Johnson
5. Greg Biffle
6. Steve Kinser
7. Kevin Harvick
8. Sam Hornish Jr.
9. Mike Bliss
10. Felipe Giaffone
11. Hélio Castroneves
12. Ryan Newman

== Race Two (Talladega Superspeedway) ==
1. Kurt Busch
2. Mike Bliss
3. Greg Biffle
4. Sam Hornish Jr.
5. Mark Martin
6. Kevin Harvick
7. Ryan Newman
8. Jimmie Johnson
9. Steve Kinser
10. Danny Lasoski
11. Felipe Giaffone
12. Hélio Castroneves

== Race Three (Chicagoland Speedway) ==
1. Mike Bliss
2. Ryan Newman
3. Kurt Busch
4. Kevin Harvick
5. Mark Martin
6. Jimmie Johnson
7. Sam Hornish Jr.
8. Scott Sharp
9. Danny Lasoski
10. Hélio Castroneves
11. Steve Kinser

== Race Four (Indianapolis Motor Speedway) ==
1. Jimmie Johnson
2. Kevin Harvick
3. Ryan Newman
4. Kurt Busch
5. Mark Martin
6. Steve Kinser
7. Greg Biffle
8. Hélio Castroneves
9. Steve Kinser
10. Mike Bliss
11. Sam Hornish Jr.
12. Danny Lasoski
