= Bobby Hamilton =

American racing driver (1957–2007)

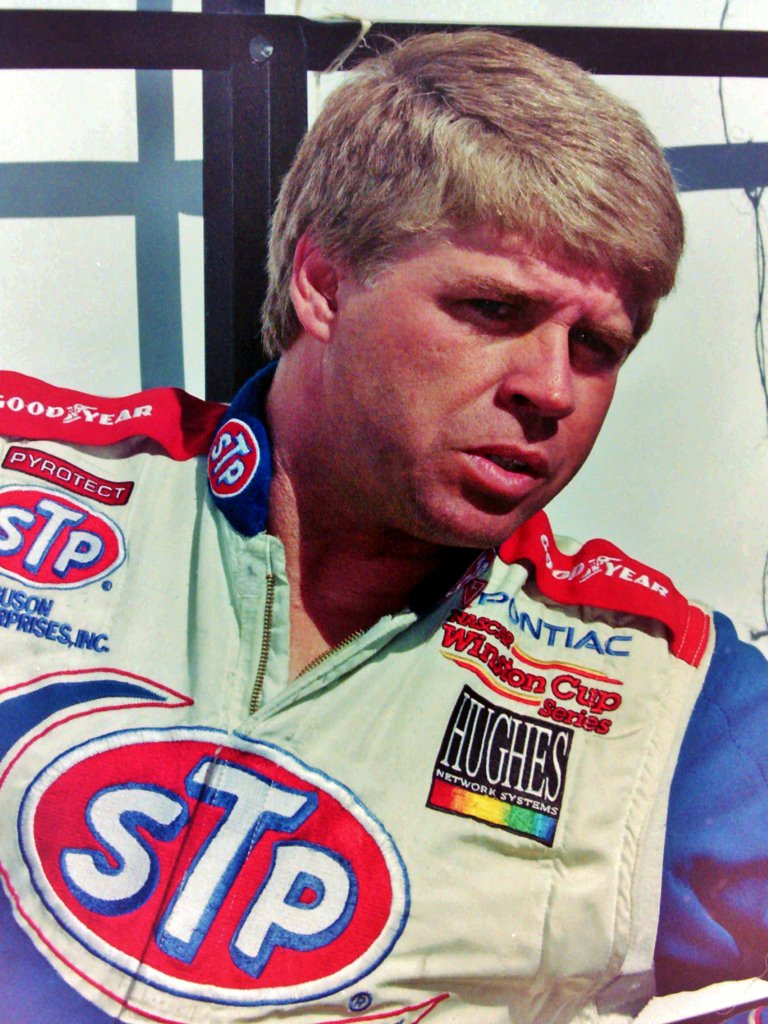
- Hamilton in 1997
- Born: Charles Robert Hamilton; May 29, 1957; Nashville, Tennessee, U.S.
- Died: January 7, 2007 (aged 49); Mt. Juliet, Tennessee, U.S.
- Cause of death: Head and neck cancer
- Achievements: 2004 NASCAR Craftsman Truck Series Champion
- Awards: 1991 Winston Cup Series Rookie of the Year

NASCAR Cup Series career
- 371 races run over 15 years
- Best finish: 9th (1996)
- First race: 1989 Autoworks 500 (Phoenix)
- Last race: 2005 Bass Pro Shops MBNA 500 (Atlanta)
- First win: 1996 Dura Lube 500 (Phoenix)
- Last win: 2001 Talladega 500 (Talladega)
Wins	Top tens	Poles
4	67	5

NASCAR O'Reilly Auto Parts Series career
- 86 races run over 12 years
- Best finish: 11th (1989, 1990)
- First race: 1988 All Pro 300 (Charlotte)
- Last race: 2005 Federated Auto Parts 300 (Nashville)
- First win: 1989 Commonwealth 200 (Richmond)
Wins	Top tens	Poles
1	22	0

NASCAR FedEx Freight Truck Series career
- 102 races run over 11 years
- Best finish: 1st (2004)
- First race: 1996 Hanes 250 (Martinsville)
- Last race: 2006 John Deere 200 (Atlanta)
- First win: 2000 NAPA 250 (Martinsville)
- Last win: 2005 UAW/GM Ohio 250 (Mansfield)
Wins	Top tens	Poles
10	54	5

Charles Robert Hamilton Sr. (May 29, 1957 – January 7, 2007) was an American stock car racing driver and racing team owner. A driver and owner in the NASCAR Craftsman Truck Series circuit and the winner of the 2004 NASCAR Craftsman Truck Series championship, Hamilton owned Bobby Hamilton Racing. Hamilton's son, Bobby Hamilton Jr., was also a NASCAR driver.

Hamilton may be best remembered for two of his Winston Cup Series wins. His first career victory at the 1996 Dura Lube 500 at Phoenix was the first win for the No. 43 Petty car since Richard Petty's last win in 1984. He also had a memorable win at the Talladega 500 in April 2001 driving the No. 55 car for owner Andy Petree. The entire 500-mile race was run caution-free and was under intense scrutiny from both NASCAR and the media at large, being the first superspeedway race run since the death of Dale Earnhardt at the 2001 Daytona 500 two months earlier. A physically and mentally exhausted Hamilton slumped to the ground after exiting his car and was given oxygen from a tank before giving the standard post-race Victory Lane interview while sitting on the ground, leaning against the drivers door.

== Early life ==
Born in Nashville, Tennessee, Hamilton lost his custodial parents to illness when he was thirteen years old (Grandfather Preacher Hamilton, car builder and crew chief for Marty Robbins at the old Nashville Fairgrounds Speedway, and Grandmother Annie Mae Hamilton) who had raised him from early childhood. Hamilton quit school at the age of fourteen and began his racing career at Nashville Speedway USA, now Fairgrounds Speedway, racing on the weekly circuit at the legendary track, where he won back to back Late Model Stock Car Championships in 1987 and 1988. In 1988, Hamilton won an unprecedented four races, in three different divisions, in one night, at Nashville Fairground Speedway. Hamilton began to be noticed within the NASCAR ranks after racing in a special four-car "Superstar Showdown" at Nashville in 1988 against Cup Series drivers Sterling Marlin, Darrell Waltrip, and Bill Elliott.

== NASCAR career ==
=== Days of Thunder ===
Hamilton broke into the Winston Cup ranks in a very unusual way. He was asked to drive one of the "movie cars" for the 1990 film Days of Thunder, qualifying 5th in the movie car at the 1989 Autoworks 500 in Phoenix, in a car that was not intended to be competitive. The car was a No. 51 Exxon Chevrolet, portrayed in the movie as being driven by Rowdy Burns.

=== 1988–1994 ===
Hamilton made his NASCAR debut in the Busch Series in 1988 at Charlotte Motor Speedway driving the No. 16 Filmar Racing Chevrolet, finishing 14th. He competed in the next race at Rockingham and finished 20th. He drove full-time in the Busch Series in 1989 driving the No. 8 Lighting & Fans Buick for FILMAR Racing, finishing 11th in points, and winning his only career Busch race at Richmond International Raceway. He made his Winston Cup debut in a "Days of Thunder" car owned by Hendrick Motorsports. He led five laps but finished 32nd after an engine failure. He matched his 11th-place points finish in 1990 with Filmar Racing, when he was picked up by Tri-Star Motorsports to run Winston Cup full-time beginning in 1991, driving the No. 68 Country Time Lemonade Oldsmobile, posting four Top 10 finishes and narrowly defeating Ted Musgrave for Rookie of the Year.

In 1992, Hamilton had two Top 10's and finished 25th in points. He began 1993 with Tri-Star but was released early in the season. He spent the rest of the season in the Cup and Busch Series, posting two Top 10's for Akins-Sutton Motorsports. Hamilton also made five Busch Series starts in the No. 05 Key Motorsports Chevrolet. In 1994, he joined SABCO Racing to driving the No. 40 Kendall Motor Oil Pontiac Grand Prix. He had just one Top 10 finish and left at the end of the season.

=== 1995–2002 ===
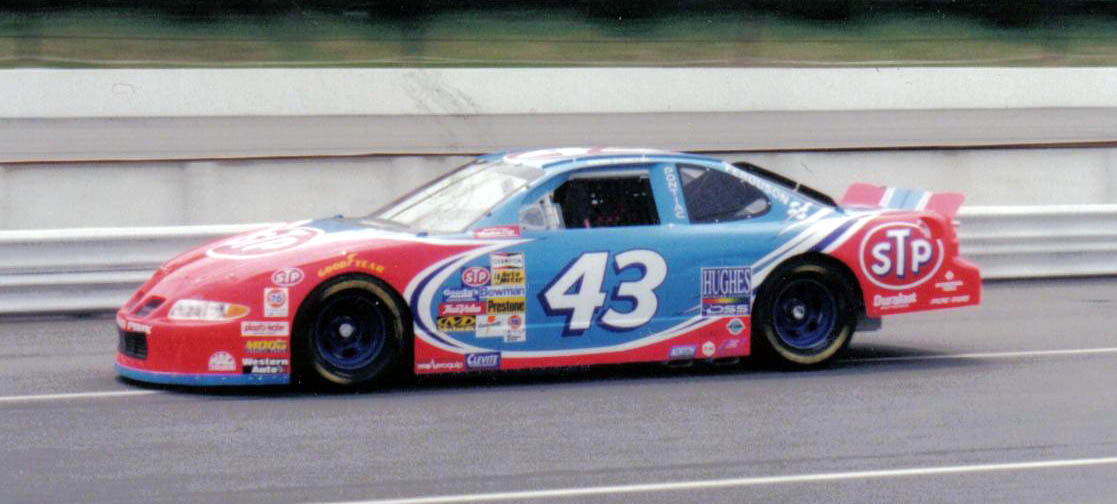
Hamilton's 1997 Winston Cup car

For the 1995 season, Hamilton moved to Petty Enterprises to drive the No. 43 STP Pontiac. He posted ten Top 10's and moved up to 14th in the final standings. The next season, he finished a career-best 9th in the points standings and won his first race at Phoenix, the first for Petty Enterprises since 1983. He also formed his own Craftsman Truck Series team and began competing in the series part-time. He won at Rockingham in 1997, but departed the team after falling to 16th in points.

Hamilton then signed with Morgan-McClure Motorsports in 1998 and in their eighth race together, he won from the pole, leading 378 of 500 laps at Martinsville Speedway. He finished the season 10th in points. He had another ten Top 10 finishes in 2000 and finished that season off 30th in points. He left for Andy Petree Racing to drive the No. 55 Square D Chevy. He won his final Cup career race at Talladega and finished 18th in points. He posted three Top 10's in 2002 but suffered a broken shoulder late in the season, causing him to miss several races.

Although his Cup Series run in 2000 was not successful, Hamilton made history regardless as he joined Ken Schrader, Terry Labonte, and Mark Martin as one of the drivers to, at that point, win a race in each of NASCAR's top-three series when he won a Craftsman Truck Series race at Martinsville.

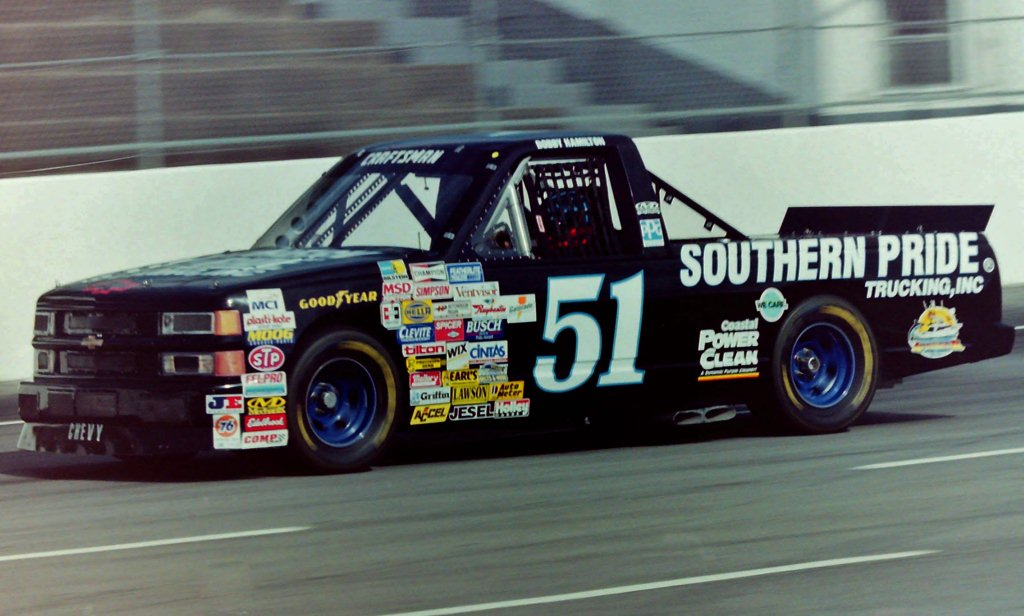
Hamilton at Martinsville in 1997

=== Craftsman Truck Series ===
Due to the injury, as well as an unstable financial situation at Petree Racing, Hamilton left the Winston Cup Series for the Truck Series driving for his own team, taking the Square D sponsorship with him. Driving the No. 4 Dana Dodge Ram Hamilton picked up two wins in his first year on the circuit and finished 6th in points. The following season, he picked up four wins and clinched the championship, marking the first time since Alan Kulwicki's championship in 1992 that an owner-driver won a NASCAR championship. He switched to the No. 04 in 2005.

In 2005, Hamilton started his Truck series season with a bizarre finish. He led the final laps of the 2005 Dodge Dealers 250 at Daytona International Speedway when Jimmy Spencer got by with a few laps left and the white flag flew just before a crash occurred in turn 1. During the accident, Hamilton passed Spencer for the lead. Due to the scoring-loop rules, before the accident it was initially believed that Spencer won. Spencer drove to victory circle, but not long afterward it was determined that Hamilton won; Hamilton was at the final scoring loop as he was in the lead.

Hamilton later won at Mansfield and went on his way to another 6th-place points finish.

Hamilton drove the No. 18 Fastenal Dodge for the first three races in 2006, but was diagnosed with cancer and never raced again, with his son finishing out the season.

== Illness and death ==
On March 17, 2006, Hamilton told the press at Atlanta Motor Speedway that he had been diagnosed with head and neck cancer, discovered during the removal of an infected wisdom tooth. Hamilton announced that the Craftsman Truck Series race at Atlanta would be his last for the time being, with his son, Bobby Hamilton Jr., replacing him in the 18 truck. Hamilton added that he wanted to return to racing by the end of season race at Homestead–Miami Speedway on November 17 and that he would attend races as his health allowed. He would begin chemotherapy and radiation at Vanderbilt University Hospital in Nashville, Tennessee. Hamilton finished 14th in the race at Atlanta that evening.

Hamilton finished chemotherapy and radiation treatments on June 7 and retained his goal to make it back to his truck at Homestead–Miami. Hamilton added that he wanted to be back at the track, but his doctors told him his white blood cell count had to rise before they would allow it. He also began working on Craftsman For a Cure, a charity designed to help multiple other organizations, including Victory Junction and Relay For Life. Hamilton returned to the track on July 8 to watch the Truck Series race at Kentucky Speedway. By August 2006, Hamilton returned to his shop to perform everyday duties and returned to the track at Nashville Superspeedway on August 12 to watch his son race and answer questions to the press. Hamilton's doctor, Barbara Murphy, added that a recent scan had shown forward progress and no sign of the cancer advancing.

Kyle Busch paid tribute to Hamilton two months later for the Truck race at Lowe's Motor Speedway by driving a truck painted to resemble the Rowdy Burns car in Days of Thunder, complete with the No. 51 and "Rowdy" decals, a tribute that Busch continued in late model and truck racing until his death in 2026.

Hamilton decided to sit out the season finale race at Homestead–Miami on November 17, 2006, citing that he was dealing with medical treatments for a sore throat. He added that he would look at the opening race of the 2007 NASCAR Craftsman Truck Series season at Daytona International Speedway for his return. Bobby Hamilton Jr. would return to the NASCAR Busch Series for the 2007 season.

With his health in flux, Bobby Hamilton Racing announced on December 8 that they would hire Ken Schrader to race the No. 18 truck for the 2007 season on weekends where the Nextel Cup Series and Truck Series would be together. At races where Schrader's Cup schedule took priority, a driver would be determined later on. However, later in December, Hamilton returned to chemotherapy due to the return of cancer cells in his neck.

Hamilton died on January 7, 2007, at his home in Mt. Juliet, Tennessee, with his family by his side.

== Motorsports career results ==
=== NASCAR ===
(key) (Bold – Pole position awarded by qualifying time. Italics – Pole position earned by points standings or practice time. * – Most laps led.)

==== Nextel Cup Series ====
NASCAR Nextel Cup Series results
Year	Team	No.	Make	1	2	3	4	5	6	7	8	9	10	11	12	13	14	15	16	17	18	19	20	21	22	23	24	25	26	27	28	29	30	31	32	33	34	35	36	NNCC	Pts	Ref
1989	Hendrick Motorsports	51	Chevy	DAY	CAR	ATL	RCH	DAR	BRI	NWS	MAR	TAL	CLT	DOV	SON	POC	MCH	DAY	POC	TAL	GLN	MCH	BRI	DAR	RCH	DOV	MAR	CLT	NWS	CAR	PHO; 32	ATL								89th	72	
1990	Diamond Ridge Motorsports	68	Pontiac	DAY	RCH	CAR	ATL	DAR	BRI	NWS	MAR	TAL	CLT; 39	DOV	SON	POC	MCH	DAY	POC	TAL	GLN	MCH	BRI	DAR	RCH	DOV	MAR	NWS												66th	168	
1990	Tri-Star Motorsports	68	Pontiac																										CLT; 28	CAR	PHO	ATL; 40								66th	168	
1991	Tri-Star Motorsports	68	Olds	DAY; 10	RCH; 28	CAR; 21	ATL; 33	DAR; 20	BRI; 31		MAR; DNQ	TAL; 12	CLT; 27	DOV; 11	SON; 22	POC; 35	MCH; 22	DAY; 28	POC; 11	TAL; 34	GLN; 29	MCH; 19	BRI; 13	DAR; 10	RCH; 12	DOV; 8	MAR; 17	NWS; 18	CLT; 29	CAR; 6	PHO; 13	ATL; 18								22nd	2915	
1991	Tri-Star Motorsports	68	Pontiac							NWS; 21																														22nd	2915	
1992	Tri-Star Motorsports	68	Olds	DAY; 32	CAR; 18	RCH; 31	ATL; 24	DAR; 23	BRI; 26	NWS; 27	MAR; 13	TAL; 20	CLT; 21	DOV; 18	SON; 34	POC; 17	MCH; 31		POC; 22		GLN; 22		BRI; 21																	25th	2787	
1992	Tri-Star Motorsports	68	Chevy															DAY; 33		TAL; 24																				25th	2787	
1992	Tri-Star Motorsports	68	Ford																			MCH; 15		DAR; 21	RCH; 32	DOV; 10	MAR; 28	NWS; 31	CLT; 15	CAR; 19	PHO; 8	ATL; 12								25th	2787	
1993	Tri-Star Motorsports	68	Ford	DAY; 27	CAR; 15	RCH; 22	ATL; 26	DAR; 23	BRI; 35	NWS; 29	MAR; 33	TAL	SON																											37th	1348	
1993	Akins Motorsports	38	Ford											CLT; DNQ	DOV; 10	POC	MCH			POC; 19	TAL; DNQ	GLN	MCH																	37th	1348	
1993	Moroso Racing	20	Ford															DAY; 17	NHA					BRI; 33	DAR	RCH	DOV	MAR	NWS	CLT; 37	CAR	PHO	ATL; 21							37th	1348	
1994	SABCO Racing	40	Pontiac	DAY; 12	CAR; 38	RCH; 33	ATL; 19	DAR; 25	BRI; 9	NWS; 14	MAR; 13	TAL; 12	SON; 33	CLT; 17	DOV; 34	POC; 27	MCH; 41	DAY; 24	NHA; 40	POC; 23	TAL; 22	IND; 24	GLN; 34	MCH; DNQ	BRI; 28	DAR; 22	RCH; 34	DOV; 31	MAR; 13	NWS; 12	CLT; 19	CAR; 33	PHO; 11	ATL; 24						23rd	2749	
1995	Petty Enterprises	43	Pontiac	DAY; 18	CAR; 36	RCH; 9	ATL; 17	DAR; 9	BRI; 4	NWS; 13	MAR; 8	TAL; 15	SON; 14	CLT; 9	DOV; 24	POC; 15	MCH; 25	DAY; 40	NHA; 16	POC; 19	TAL; 21	IND; 11	GLN; 33	MCH; 8	BRI; 20	DAR; 14	RCH; 5	DOV; 2	MAR; 4	NWS; 16	CLT; 10	CAR; 30	PHO; 31	ATL; 25						14th	3576	
1996	Petty Enterprises	43	Pontiac	DAY; 20	CAR; 24	RCH; 6*	ATL; 16	DAR; 16	BRI; 32	NWS; 8	MAR; 6	TAL; 11	SON; 17	CLT; 31	DOV; 21	POC; 5	**MCH**; 15	DAY; 16	NHA; 20	POC; 39	TAL; 17	IND; 31	GLN; 38	MCH; 13	BRI; 10	DAR; 19	RCH; 7	DOV; 10	**MAR**; 3*	NWS; 8	CLT; 19	CAR; 28	PHO; 1	ATL; 6						9th	3639	
1997	Petty Enterprises	43	Pontiac	DAY; 15	CAR; 28	RCH; 5	ATL; 10	DAR; 37	TEX; 20	BRI; 13	MAR; 2	SON; 19	TAL; 31	CLT; 29	DOV; 17	**POC**; 39	MCH; 32	CAL; 23	DAY; 20	NHA; 31	POC; 32	IND; 20	GLN; 28	MCH; 26	BRI; 22	DAR; 20	RCH; 38	NHA; 3	DOV; 13	MAR; 3	CLT; 21	TAL; 20	CAR; 1	**PHO**; 3	ATL; 7					16th	3450	
1998	Morgan-McClure Motorsports	4	Chevy	DAY; 12	CAR; 9	LVS; 20	ATL; 21	DAR; 35	BRI; 18	TEX; 26	**MAR**; 1*	TAL; 30	CAL; 27	CLT; 20	DOV; 17	RCH; 16	MCH; 38	POC; 20	SON; 2	NHA; 15	POC; 20	IND; 20	GLN; 13	MCH; 20	BRI; 11	NHA; 34	DAR; 23	RCH; 6	DOV; 10	MAR; 14	CLT; 4	TAL; 15	DAY; 21	PHO; 21	CAR; 6	ATL; 6				10th	3786	
1999	Morgan-McClure Motorsports	4	Chevy	DAY; 29	CAR; 9	LVS; 24	ATL; 12	DAR; 7	TEX; 29	BRI; 18	MAR; 33	TAL; 31	CAL; 30	RCH; 4	CLT; 13	DOV; 21	MCH; 31	POC; 10	SON; 11	DAY; 8	NHA; 16	POC; 17	IND; 38	GLN; 22	MCH; 35	BRI; 41	DAR; 7	RCH; 7	NHA; 11	DOV; 30	MAR; 30	CLT; 22	TAL; 9	CAR; 10	PHO; 23	HOM; 25	ATL; 10			13th	3564	
2000	Morgan-McClure Motorsports	4	Chevy	DAY; 43	CAR; 40	LVS; 34	ATL; 13	DAR; 7	BRI; 15	TEX; 16	MAR; 18	TAL; 43	CAL; 18	RCH; 31	CLT; 34	DOV; 27	MCH; 43	POC; 40	SON; 16	DAY; 36	NHA; 22	POC; 39	IND; 40	GLN; 16	MCH; 14	BRI; 34	DAR; 22	RCH; 38	NHA; 35	DOV; 25	MAR; 35	CLT; 34	TAL; 36	CAR; 9	PHO; 43	HOM; 31	ATL; 16			30th	2715	
2001	Andy Petree Racing	55	Chevy	DAY; 8	CAR; 13	LVS; 30	ATL; 22	DAR; 9	BRI; 8	TEX; 18	MAR; 4*	TAL; 1	CAL; 36	RCH; 28	CLT; 24	DOV; 20	MCH; 22	POC; 33	SON; 15	DAY; 38	CHI; 30	NHA; 29	POC; 29	IND; 27	GLN; 36	MCH; 28	BRI; 23	DAR; 15	RCH; 13	DOV; 10	KAN; 15	CLT; 31	MAR; 13	TAL; 5	PHO; 36	CAR; 22	HOM; 39	ATL; 27	NHA; 29	18th	3575	
2002	Andy Petree Racing	55	Chevy	DAY; 32	CAR; 9	LVS; 43	ATL; 29	DAR; 13	BRI; 28	TEX; 31	MAR; 27	TAL; 22	CAL; 30	RCH; 17	CLT; 23	DOV; 9	POC; 27	MCH; 37	SON; 31	DAY; 16	CHI; 15	NHA; 26	POC; 19	IND; 23	GLN; 19	MCH; 23	BRI; 11	DAR; 23	RCH	NHA	DOV	KAN	TAL	CLT; 27	MAR; 25	ATL; 35	CAR; 38	PHO; 29	HOM; 10	32nd	2832	
2005	Bobby Hamilton Racing	04	Dodge	DAY	CAL	LVS	ATL	BRI	MAR	TEX	PHO	TAL	DAR	RCH	CLT	DOV	POC	MCH	SON	DAY	CHI	NHA	POC	IND; 27	GLN	MCH	BRI	CAL	RCH	NHA	DOV	TAL	KAN	CLT		ATL; 30	TEX	PHO	HOM	60th	201	
2005	Phoenix Racing	09	Dodge																																MAR; 39					60th	201	

===== Daytona 500 =====
Year	Team	Manufacturer	Start	Finish
1991	Tri-Star Motorsports	Oldsmobile	20	10
1992	Tri-Star Motorsports	Oldsmobile	22	32
1993	Tri-Star Motorsports	Ford	27	27
1994	SABCO Racing	Pontiac	23	12
1995	Petty Enterprises	Pontiac	25	18
1996	Petty Enterprises	Pontiac	39	20
1997	Petty Enterprises	Pontiac	39	15
1998	Morgan-McClure Motorsports	Chevrolet	22	12
1999	Morgan-McClure Motorsports	Chevrolet	16	29
2000	Morgan-McClure Motorsports	Chevrolet	37	43
2001	Andy Petree Racing	Chevrolet	35	8
2002	Andy Petree Racing	Chevrolet	32	32

==== Busch Series ====
NASCAR Busch Series results
Year	Team	No.	Make	1	2	3	4	5	6	7	8	9	10	11	12	13	14	15	16	17	18	19	20	21	22	23	24	25	26	27	28	29	30	31	32	33	34	35	NBSC	Pts	Ref
1988	Bobby Hamilton Racing	16	Chevy	DAY	HCY	CAR	MAR	DAR	BRI	LNG	NZH	SBO	NSV	CLT	DOV	ROU	LAN	LVL	MYB	OXF	SBO	HCY	LNG	IRP	ROU	BRI	DAR	RCH	DOV	MAR	CLT; 14	CAR; 20	MAR						100th	0	
1989	FILMAR Racing	8	Buick	DAY; 19	CAR	MAR; 28	HCY; 23	DAR; 24	BRI; 24	NZH; 20	SBO; 14	LAN; 24	NSV; 2	CLT; 21	DOV; 29	ROU; 19	LVL; 20	VOL; 16	MYB; 3	SBO; 16	HCY; 24	DUB; 6	IRP; 17	ROU; 23		DAR; 27													11th	3133	
1989	FILMAR Racing	8	Olds																						BRI; 24		RCH; 1	DOV; 24	MAR; 22	CLT; 17	CAR; 3	MAR; 8							11th	3133	
1990	FILMAR Racing	8	Olds	DAY; 11	RCH; 9	CAR; 35	MAR; 5	HCY; 26	DAR; 12	BRI; 11	LAN; 4	SBO; 7	NZH; 8	HCY; 6	CLT; 36	DOV; 25	ROU; 4	VOL; 3	MYB; 23	OXF; 27	NHA; 38	SBO; 3	DUB; 20	IRP; 29	ROU; 6	BRI; 7	DAR; 21	RCH; 14	DOV; 5	MAR; 24	CLT; 5	NHA; 42	CAR; 34	MAR; 8					11th	3616	
1991	Tri-Star Motorsports	68	Olds	DAY	RCH	CAR	MAR	VOL	HCY	DAR	BRI	LAN	SBO	NZH	CLT	DOV	ROU	HCY	MYB	GLN	OXF	NHA	SBO	DUB	IRP; 25	ROU	BRI	DAR	RCH	DOV	CLT	NHA	CAR	MAR					96th	88	
1992	Fred Turner Racing	48	Olds	DAY	CAR	RCH	ATL	MAR	DAR	BRI	HCY	LAN	DUB	NZH	CLT	DOV	ROU	MYB	GLN	VOL	NHA	TAL	IRP; 25	ROU	MCH	NHA	BRI	DAR	RCH	DOV	CLT	MAR	CAR	HCY					110th	88	
1993	Akins-Sutton Motorsports	38	Ford	DAY	CAR	RCH	DAR	BRI	HCY; 23	ROU	MAR; 31	NZH	CLT						IRP; 9	MCH	NHA	BRI	DAR																47th	594	
1993	Key Motorsports	05	Chevy											DOV; 29	MYB	GLN	MLW	TAL						RCH; 21	DOV; 32	ROU	CLT	MAR	CAR	HCY									47th	594	
1993	Day Enterprise Racing	16	Chevy																												ATL; 38								47th	594	
1995	Team SABCO	42	Pontiac	DAY; 36	CAR	RCH	ATL	NSV; 15	DAR	BRI; 21	HCY	NHA	NZH	CLT; DNQ	DOV	MYB	GLN	MLW	TAL; 37	SBO	IRP	MCH	BRI	DAR	RCH	DOV	CLT	CAR	HOM										57th	325	
1996	Labonte Motorsports	5	Chevy	DAY	CAR	RCH	ATL	NSV	DAR	BRI	HCY	NZH	CLT	DOV	SBO	MYB	GLN	MLW	NHA	TAL	IRP	MCH	BRI	DAR	RCH	DOV	CLT	CAR	HOM; 24										88th	91	
1999	Mac Martin Racing	94	Chevy	DAY	CAR	LVS	ATL	DAR	TEX	NSV	BRI	TAL	CAL	NHA	RCH	NZH	CLT	DOV	SBO	GLN	MLW	MYB	PPR	GTY	IRP	MCH; 28	BRI	DAR	RCH										80th	276	
1999	Mac Martin Racing	80	Chevy																											DOV; 15	CLT; 28	CAR	MEM	PHO; DNQ	HOM; DNQ				80th	276	
2001	Carroll Racing	08	Chevy	DAY; 42	CAR	LVS	ATL	DAR	BRI	TEX																													93rd	140	
2001	Phoenix Racing	1	Chevy								NSH; 20	TAL	CAL	RCH	NHA	NZH	CLT	DOV	KEN	MLW	GLN	CHI	GTY	PPR	IRP	MCH	BRI	DAR	RCH	DOV	KAN	CLT	MEM	PHO	CAR	HOM			93rd	140	
2004	Phoenix Racing	1	Chevy	DAY	CAR	LVS	DAR	BRI	TEX	NSH	TAL	CAL	GTY	RCH	NZH	CLT	DOV	NSH	KEN	MLW	DAY	CHI	NHA	PPR	IRP; 16	MCH	BRI	CAL	RCH	DOV	KAN	CLT	MEM	ATL	PHO	DAR	HOM		111th	115	
2005	Sadler Brothers Racing	95	Dodge	DAY; 11	CAL	MXC	LVS	ATL; 18	NSH; 6	BRI	TEX	PHO	TAL	DAR; 27	RCH	CLT	DOV	NSH; 22	KEN	MLW	DAY	CHI	NHA	PPR	GTY	IRP	GLN	MCH	BRI	CAL	RCH	DOV	KAN	CLT	MEM	TEX	PHO	HOM	63rd	568	

==== Craftsman Truck Series ====
NASCAR Craftsman Truck Series results
Year	Team	No.	Make	1	2	3	4	5	6	7	8	9	10	11	12	13	14	15	16	17	18	19	20	21	22	23	24	25	26	27	NCTC	Pts	Ref
1996	Chuck Spicer Racing	48	Chevy	HOM	PHO	POR	EVG	TUS	CNS	HPT	BRI	NZH	MLW	LVL	I70	IRP	FLM	GLN	NSV	RCH	NHA	**MAR**; 31*	NWS; 25	SON	MMR	PHO	LVS				86th	158	
1997	Bobby Hamilton Racing	1	Chevy	WDW	TUS	HOM	PHO	POR	EVG	I70	NHA	TEX	BRI	NZH	MLW	LVL	CNS	HPT; 6	IRP	FLM	NSV	GLN	RCH								61st	305	
1997	Bobby Hamilton Racing	51	Chevy																					MAR; 5	SON	MMR	CAL	PHO	LVS		61st	305	
1998	Bobby Hamilton Racing	40	Chevy	WDW; 34	HOM	PHO	POR	EVG	I70	GLN	TEX	BRI	MLW	NZH	CAL	PPR	IRP	NHA	FLM	NSV	HPT	LVL									69th	186	
1998	Bobby Hamilton Racing	1	Chevy																				RCH; 34	MEM	GTY	MAR; 33	SON	MMR	PHO	LVS	69th	186	
1999	Bobby Hamilton Racing	4	Dodge	HOM	PHO	EVG	MMR	MAR; 22	MEM; 21	PPR	I70	BRI	TEX	PIR	GLN	MLW	NSV	NZH	MCH	NHA; 22	IRP	GTY	HPT	**RCH**; 31	LVS	LVL	TEX				36th	539	
1999	Bobby Hamilton Racing	04	Dodge																									CAL; 4			36th	539	
2000	Bobby Hamilton Racing	4	Dodge	DAY; 30	HOM	PHO	MMR	MAR; 1*	PIR	GTY	**MEM**; 29	PPR	EVG	TEX	KEN	GLN	MLW	NHA; 20	NZH	MCH	IRP	NSV	CIC	RCH; 10	DOV	TEX	CAL				42nd	586	
2001	Bobby Hamilton Racing	4	Dodge	DAY	HOM; 15*	MMR	MAR	GTY	DAR; 1*	PPR	DOV	TEX	MEM	MLW	KAN	KEN	NHA; 25	IRP; 4	NSH	CIC	NZH	RCH; 7	SBO	TEX	LVS	PHO	CAL				38th	707	
2002	Bobby Hamilton Racing	4	Dodge	DAY	DAR	MAR	GTY	PPR	DOV	TEX	MEM	MLW	KAN	KEN	NHA	MCH	IRP; 30	NSH	RCH; 14	TEX	SBO	LVS	CAL	PHO	HOM						66th	194	
2003	Bobby Hamilton Racing	4	Dodge	DAY; 4	DAR; 1	MMR; 4	MAR; 5	CLT; 7	**DOV**; 2	**TEX**; 7	MEM; 7	MLW; 29	KAN; 16	KEN; 18	GTW; 14	MCH; 10	IRP; 3	NSH; 11	BRI; 12	RCH; 8	NHA; 3	CAL; 16	LVS; 10	SBO; 8	TEX; 10	MAR; 5	PHO; 5	**HOM**; 1*			6th	3627	
2004	Bobby Hamilton Racing	4	Dodge	DAY; 11	ATL; 1	MAR; 31	MFD; 4	CLT; 10	DOV; 19	TEX; 7	MEM; 1	MLW; 6	KAN; 2*	KEN; 1*	GTW; 17	MCH; 5*	IRP; 3	NSH; 1	BRI; 12	RCH; 26	NHA; 15	LVS; 5	CAL; 5	TEX; 3	MAR; 26	PHO; 7	DAR; 2	HOM; 16			1st	3624	
2005	Bobby Hamilton Racing	04	Dodge	DAY; 1	CAL; 2	ATL; 3	**MAR**; 20	GTY; 6	MFD; 1*	CLT; 28	DOV; 21	TEX; 17	MCH; 3	MLW; 6	KAN; 12	KEN; 31	MEM; 6	IRP; 13	NSH; 9	BRI; 31	RCH; 24	NHA; 30	LVS; 5	MAR; 14	ATL; 7	TEX; 9	PHO; 17	HOM; 31			6th	3164	
2006	Bobby Hamilton Racing	18	Dodge	DAY; 21	CAL; 23	ATL; 14	MAR	GTY	CLT	MFD	DOV	TEX	MCH	MLW	KAN	KEN	MEM	IRP	NSH	BRI	NHA	LVS	TAL	MAR	ATL	TEX	PHO	HOM			49th	315	

=== International Race of Champions ===
(key) (Bold – Pole position. * – Most laps led.)

International Race of Champions results
Season	Make	1	2	3	4	Pos.	Points	Ref
2005	Pontiac	DAY; 3	TEX; 5	RCH; 12	ATL; 10	7th	34	

Sporting positions
Preceded by Rob Moroso	NASCAR Rookie of the Year; 1991	Succeeded by Jimmy Hensley
Preceded by Travis Kvapil	NASCAR Craftsman Truck Series Champion; 2004	Succeeded by Ted Musgrave
