= Danny Lasoski =

American sprint car racing driver

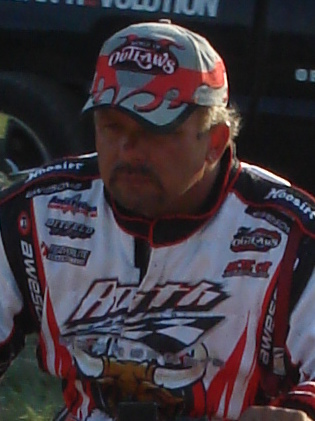
- Lasoski at the 2007 Kings Royal
- Born: February 3, 1959 (age 67) Dover, Missouri, U.S.
- Relatives: Brian Brown (nephew)

Previous series
- 2006: National Sprint Tour; World of Outlaws

Championship titles
- 2006 2001: National Sprint Tour; World of Outlaws

Danny "the Dude" Lasoski (born February 3, 1959) is an American sprint car racing driver from Dover, Missouri.

== Sprint car racing ==
Most of Lasoski's sprint car experience is in the World of Outlaws series, winning the WoO championship in 2001, and finishing second four times, in 1999, 2002, 2003, and 2004. He won the premiere event in sprint car racing, the Knoxville Nationals, in 1998, 2001, 2003 and 2004. Lasoski also won the 360 Nationals in 1995. He raced in the National Sprint Tour in 2006, winning the series' only championship. He rejoined the World of Outlaws after the season, and the NST folded. He has won 122 World of Outlaw feature events and was one of the more popular drivers on the tour.

In January 2014, Lasoski teamed up with Andy Cobb to compete in multiple national tours to include the World of Outlaws.

Lasoski joined forces in 2015 with car owner Tod Quiring and crew chief Guy Forbrook to win the inaugural National Sprint League (NSL) Championship. Lasoski has also won 11 Knoxville Raceway track championships (1986, 1989, 1990, 1992, 1993, 1994, 1996, 2008, 2011, 2015, 2016). He has won more races than any other driver with 112 career wins as of June 24, 2017, in the 410 division at Knoxville Raceway. He also has 37 career wins with the All Star Circuit of Champions.

Lasoski has driven for some of the top sprint car teams in the sport including Tod Quiring, Dennis Roth, Tony Stewart, and Casey Luna.

Lasoski is the uncle to professional sprint car racer Brian Brown.

== IROC ==
Lasoski was invited to the International Race of Champions four times, from 2002 until 2004. He missed the final race in 2002 at the Indianapolis Motor Speedway due to injuries sustained in a qualifying crash, with fellow dirt track racer Ken Schrader filling in. Lasoski won one race, in 2004 at the Texas Motor Speedway.

Lasoski also raced in the Canadian IROC series picking up three wins, all of them at the Canadian Motor Speedway.

== Awards ==
He was inducted in the National Sprint Car Hall of Fame in 2011.

== Motorsports career results ==
=== International Race of Champions ===
(key) (Bold – Pole position. * – Most laps led.)

International Race of Champions results
Season	Make	1	2	3	4	Pos.	Points	Ref
2002	Pontiac	DAY; 6	CAL; 12	CHI; 11	IND	12th	30	
2003	Pontiac	DAY; 3	TAL; 10	CHI; 10	IND; 12	9th	27	
2004	Pontiac	DAY; 12	**TEX**; 1	RCH; 10	ATL; 3	6th	51	
2005	Pontiac	DAY; 7	TEX; 7	RCH; 7	ATL; 5	8th	34	

Sporting positions
Preceded by Steve Kinser	World of Outlaws Champion; 2001	Succeeded by Steve Kinser
