= IROC XXVIII =

28th season of the Crown Royal International Race of Champions

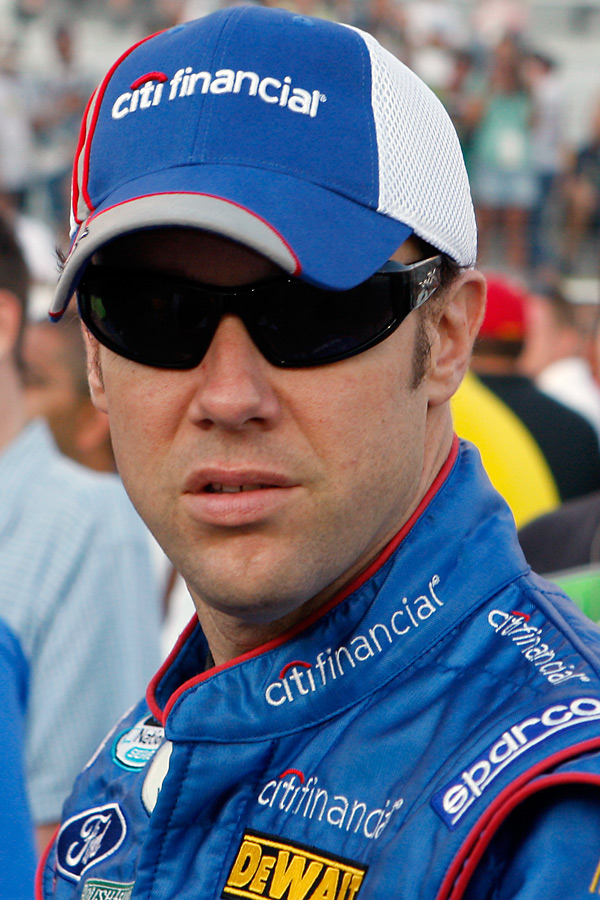
Matt Kenseth (seen in 2009), the IROC XXVIII champion

IROC XXVIII was the 28th season of the Crown Royal International Race of Champions, which began on Friday, February 13, 2004 at Daytona International Speedway. The all-star roster included twelve drivers from five premier racing series. Matt Kenseth won the championship, finishing third in the first race, last in the second race, and first in the final two races.

The roster of drivers and final points standings were as follows:

Position	Driver	Points	Car Number	Series
1	(United States) Matt Kenseth	72	#17	NASCAR Nextel Cup
2	(United States) Ryan Newman	67	#12	NASCAR Nextel Cup
3	(United States) Kevin Harvick	55	#29	NASCAR Nextel Cup
4	(United States) Jimmie Johnson	46	#48	NASCAR Nextel Cup
5	(United States) Kurt Busch	46	#97	NASCAR Nextel Cup
6	(United States) Danny Lasoski	43	#20	World of Outlaws
7	(United States) Scott Sharp	34	#8	Indy Racing League
8	(United States) Travis Kvapil	34	#24	NASCAR Craftsman Truck Series
9	(Brazil) Hélio Castroneves	32	#03	Indy Racing League
10	(New Zealand) Scott Dixon	30	#1	Indy Racing League
11	(United States) Steve Kinser	29	#11	World of Outlaws
12	(United States) J. J. Yeley	22	#80	USAC

== Race One (Daytona International Speedway) ==
1. 12- Ryan Newman
2. 97- Kurt Busch
3. 17- Matt Kenseth
4. 48- Jimmie Johnson
5. 11- Steve Kinser
6. 03- Hélio Castroneves
7. 29- Kevin Harvick
8. 1- Scott Dixon
9. 8- Scott Sharp
10. 24- Travis Kvapil
11. 80- J. J. Yeley
12. 20- Danny Lasoski

== Race Two (Texas Motor Speedway) ==
1. 20- Danny Lasoski
2. 29- Kevin Harvick
3. 48- Jimmie Johnson
4. 12- Ryan Newman
5. 24- Travis Kvapil
6. 8- Scott Sharp
7. 03- Hélio Castroneves
8. 11- Steve Kinser
9. 1- Scott Dixon
10. 80- J. J. Yeley
11. 97- Kurt Busch
12. 17-Matt Kenseth

== Race Three (Richmond International Raceway) ==
1. 17- Matt Kenseth
2. 12- Ryan Newman
3. 97- Kurt Busch
4. 48- Jimmie Johnson
5. 29- Kevin Harvick
6. 8- Scott Sharp
7. 80- J. J. Yeley
8. 03- Hélio Castroneves
9. 1- Scott Dixon
10. 20- Danny Lasoski
11. 24- Travis Kvapil
12. 11- Steve Kinser

== Race Four (Atlanta Motor Speedway) ==
1. 17- Matt Kenseth
2. 12- Ryan Newman
3. 20- Danny Lasoski
4. 97- Kurt Busch
5. 24- Travis Kvapil
6. 48- Jimmie Johnson
7. 29- Kevin Harvick
8. 1- Scott Dixon
9. 11- Steve Kinser
10. 8- Scott Sharp
11. 03- Hélio Castroneves
12. 80- J. J. Yeley

== Standings ==
Pos.	Driver	DAY	TEX	RCH	ATL	Pts
1	(United States) Matt Kenseth	3	12	1	1	72
2	(United States) Ryan Newman	1	4	2	2	67
3	(United States) Kevin Harvick	7	2	5	7	55
4	(United States) Jimmie Johnson	4	3	4	6	46
5	(United States) Kurt Busch	2	11	3	4	46
6	(United States) Danny Lasoski	12	1	10	3	43
7	(United States) Scott Sharp	9	6	6	10	34
8	(United States) Travis Kvapil	10	5	11	5	34
9	(Brazil) Helio Castroneves	6	7	8	11	32
10	(New Zealand) Scott Dixon	8	9	9	8	32
11	(United States) Steve Kinser	5	8	12	9	29
12	(United States) J. J. Yeley	11	10	7	12	22
