= National Sprint Tour =

- Category: Sprint car racing
- Country: United States
- Inaugural season: 2006
- Folded: 2006
- Last Drivers' champion: Danny Lasoski
- Last Constructors' champion: Roth Motorsports

The National Sprint Tour was a United States sprint car racing league. It formed in 2005 as a rival to the World of Outlaws. The series folded after one season. The series was started by Brownfield Promotions, Inc. of Snohomish, Washington. The series featured 410 winged sprint cars. After the death of Fred Brownfield, the series was bought by Don Lamberti and Lonnie Parsons (#6 Casey's General Store), Guy Stockbridge (#14 Elite Racing), and Steve Kinser (#11 Quaker State).

Notable former drivers in the NST included 20-time World of Outlaws champion Steve Kinser (Steve Kinser Racing), Danny Lasoski (Roth Motorsports), and Tim Kaeding (Previously Steve Kinser Racing). Lasoski won the inaugural NST championship.

== Development of the NST ==
In 2003, changes in sprint car racing began when Boundless Motorsports, a Texas-based organization, had purchased the leading organization of dirt-track modifieds, Drivers Independent Race Tracks ("DIRT"), from Glenn Donnelly. Boundless stated their goal was to consolidate dirt track racing of all classes to provide consistent rule and equipment standards and to create a national platform for this popular grass roots sport.

In August 2003, Ted Johnson announced the sale of the World of Outlaws to Boundless. After the sale, Boundless (now known as DIRT Motorsports) completed a series of acquisitions of race tracks and added late model racing under the WoO name and big block modified racing, and began signing teams to a new concept where a set number of teams would appear at every race, earning special bonuses (the "Mean 15" for the Sprint Car Series). In September 2006, under new management DIRT announced that it was moving its headquarters to Charlotte, North Carolina in 2007.

Some drivers were angered by WoO's contract with The Outdoor Channel television contract being unfriendly to some contestants given the limited exposure provided by the Outdoor Channel. Noted driver Danny Lasoski mentioned the lack of media coverage since MTV's mistreatment of the World of Outlaws (see American Speed Association).

In late 2005, the Richard Petty Driving Experience attempted to organize a rival tour to the Outlaws, and gained support from Tony Stewart. While this effort failed, Brownfield Promotions, a Northwest-based track owner and sanctioning body of lower-level sprint cars in that region, assumed control and contracts of the stillborn Petty tour, renamed it the National Sprint Tour, and began its 2006 season.

== Demise ==
Fred Brownfield was killed in June 2006, and with the series future in question, its assets were sold in early July to three team owners in order to finish the 2006 season-- Don Lamberti and Lonnie Parsons (#6 Casey's General Store), Guy Stockbridge (#14 Elite Racing), and Steve Kinser (#11 Quaker State) for $250,000. Since Brownfield had only 2 months to put together a 2006 schedule, the schedule had only 45 dates.

There was intense speculation in October 2006 about the future of the series. The NST had not announced a racing schedule for 2007, and most of the prominent industry promoters decided to sanction World of Outlaws events. Prominent drivers Danny Lasoski and Steve Kinser announced that they would be racing full time with the World of Outlaws beginning with the 2007 season. The World of Outlaws announced it would be nationally broadcast on the Speed Channel and ESPN2 in 2007. NST announced over the 2006-2007 offseason that it would fold as a national tour, while selling its remaining Northwest-based tour, now the Northwest Sprint Challenge Series.

== Champion ==
- 2006 Danny Lasoski
