= Wayne Taylor =

South African racing driver and team owner

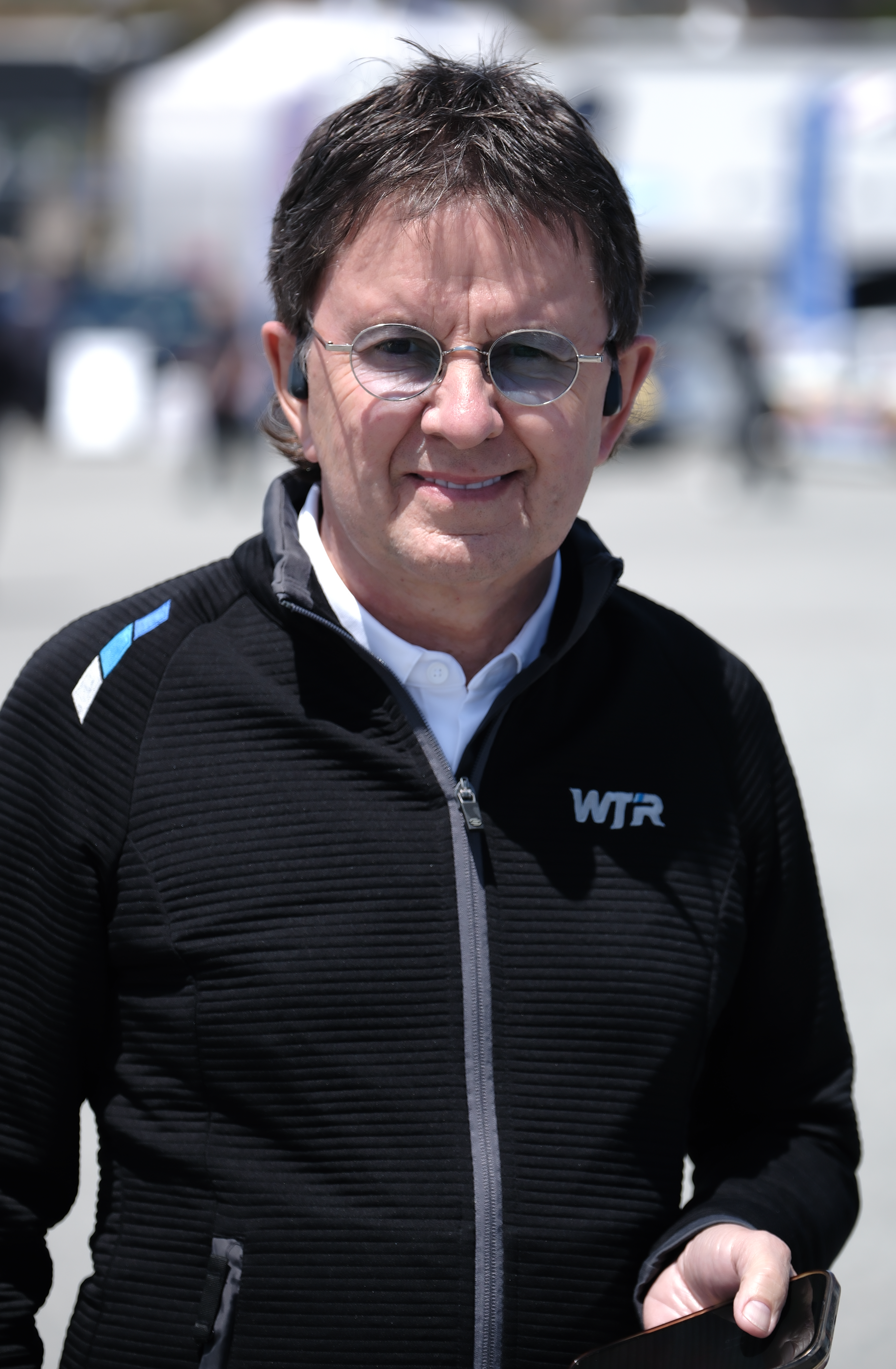
- Wayne Taylor in the 2026 IMSA Weathertech Sportscar Paddock at Laguna Seca Raceway
- Nationality: (South Africa) South African
- Born: 15 July 1956 (age 70) Port Elizabeth, Eastern Cape, South Africa
- Relatives: Jordan Taylor (son); Ricky Taylor (son)

24 Hours of Le Mans career
- Years: 1987–1993, 1996–1998, 2000–2002
- Best finish: 4th (1987)
- Class wins: 1 (1998)

Wayne Taylor (born 15 July 1956) is a South African sports car racing driver and team owner. He won the 1996 and 2005 24 Hours of Daytona, and the 2005 Grand-Am Rolex Sports Car Series Daytona Prototype drivers' championship. He drove for SunTrust Racing with Max Angelelli. He co-drove in the 2006 International Race of Champions in the United States with Angelelli. Taylor now owns and manages his own team competing in the WeatherTech SportsCar Championship.

== Racing career ==
Taylor won the 1986 South African National Drivers Championship. In 1987, he finished fourth in the 24 Hours of Le Mans. He moved to the FIA World Sportscar Championship. He competed in the C2 class in 1988, and moved to the C1 class in 1989. He also competed in the IMSA Camel GT series from 1989 through 1993. From 1991 through 1993, he was one of the lead drivers for the Intrepid RM-1 GTP program.

Taylor won the IMSA WSC class in 1994, with second-place finishes in the 24 Hours of Daytona and the 12 Hours of Sebring. He also won the 1996 24 Hours of Daytona and 1996 12 Hours of Sebring with Scott Sharp and Jim Pace in a Riley & Scott Mk III Oldsmobile.

Taylor was once more IMSA WSC champion in 1996. In 1998 he won Petit Le Mans and the prototype class in the 24 Hours of Daytona.

Taylor competed in the American Le Mans Series in 1999. From 2000 to 2002, he was a central part of the Cadillac Le Mans effort. It was handled by his long-time technical partner in 2000 Bob Riley before the chassis program was moved in England and an updated car was built for 2001, followed by a completely new car, the LMP-02, in 2002. Unfortunately, it was not successful against Audi's R8 and even privately entered LMPs, so GM discontinued the program at the end of the year. Taylor tried to secure funding to run a privateer effort with the car, but instead eventually continued with Cadillac in the Speed World Challenge CTS-V effort.

With Max Angelelli, Taylor was co-champion in the Daytona Prototype category of the 2005 Grand American Road Racing Association Rolex Sports Car Series, and the pair also took the overall win in the 24 Hours of Daytona.

In 2006, Taylor and his Grand-Am teammate, Max Angelelli made IROC Series history becoming the first tandem of drivers to compete in one car during an IROC season. They each raced two races and points were combined for their tally as they are in the sportscar series.

In mid-2006, Taylor announced a split with car builder Bob Riley and formed Wayne Taylor Racing for the 2007 season with continued backing from SunTrust, and Angelelli as co-driver. The team is based in Indianapolis. Early in 2007, Taylor stepped away from full-time driving and used a host of fill in drivers before naming Michael Valiante to team up with Angelelli full-time in 2008. Taylor continues to drive in the long distance events. The team continued to field Riley Chassis in 2007 before switching to the new Dallara chassis after the 2008 24 Hours of Daytona. In May 2008, the team's transporter caught fire and destroyed it, the new Dallara and all of their equipment. The team fielded their old Riley with borrowed equipment until a new Dallara could be built and shipped to the US. On 23 August, the team scored their first win of the year and the first for Dallara in Grand-Am at Infineon Raceway California.

Taylor's team won its second Grand-Am championship in 2013 with Angelelli co-driving with his son Jordan Taylor. Wayne's older son Ricky Taylor is also a Grand-Am regular and was Angelelli's regular teammate until Jordan replaced him in 2013.

== Motorsports career results ==
=== 24 Hours of Le Mans results ===
| Year | Team | Co-Drivers | Car | Class | Laps | Pos. | Class Pos. |
|---|---|---|---|---|---|---|---|
| 1987 | (Germany) Porsche Kremer Racing | (South Africa) George Fouché (Austria) Franz Konrad | Porsche 962C | C1 | 327 | 4th | 4th |
| 1988 | (United Kingdom) Cosmik GP Motorsport | (Greece) Costas Los (United Kingdom) Evan Clements | Spice SE87C-Ford | C2 | 145 | DNF | DNF |
| 1989 | (United Kingdom) Spice Engineering | (Denmark) Thorkild Thyrring (United Kingdom) Tim Harvey | Spice SE89C-Ford | C1 | 150 | DNF | DNF |
| 1990 | (Australia) Team Schuppan (Australia) Omron Racing | (United States) Hurley Haywood (Sweden) Rickard Rydell | Porsche 962C | C1 | 332 | 12th | 12th |
| 1991 | (Switzerland) Team Salamin Primagaz (Australia) Team Schuppan | (United States) Hurley Haywood (United Kingdom) James Weaver | Porsche 962C | C2 | 316 | NC | NC |
| 1992 | (United Kingdom) British Racing Motors | (Finland) Harri Toivonen (United Kingdom) Richard Jones | BRM P351 | C1 | 20 | DNF | DNF |
| 1993 | (Germany) Porsche Kremer Racing | (Germany) Jürgen Lässig (Italy) Giovanni Lavaggi | Porsche 962CK6 | C2 | 328 | 12th | 7th |
| 1996 | (United States) Riley & Scott Cars Inc. | (United States) Scott Sharp (United States) Jim Pace | Riley & Scott Mk III-Oldsmobile | WSC | 157 | DNF | DNF |
| 1997 | (Japan) Nissan Motorsport (United Kingdom) TWR | (United Kingdom) Martin Brundle (Germany) Jörg Müller | Nissan R390 GT1 | GT1 | 139 | DNF | DNF |
| 1998 | (United States) Doyle-Risi Racing | (Belgium) Eric van de Poele (Spain) Fermín Velez | Ferrari 333 SP | LMP1 | 332 | 8th | **1st** |
| 2000 | (United States) Team Cadillac | (Italy) Max Angelelli (Belgium) Eric van de Poele | Cadillac Northstar LMP | LMP900 | 287 | 22nd | 12th |
| 2001 | (France) DAMS | (Italy) Max Angelelli (France) Christophe Tinseau | Cadillac Northstar LMP01 | LMP900 | 270 | 15th | 5th |
| 2002 | (United States) Team Cadillac | (Italy) Max Angelelli (France) Christophe Tinseau | Cadillac Northstar LMP02 | LMP900 | 345 | 9th | 8th |

=== WeatherTech SportsCar Championship results ===
(key)(Races in bold indicate pole position, Results are overall/class)

| Year | Team | Class | Make | Engine | 1 | 2 | 3 | 4 | 5 | 6 | 7 | 8 | 9 | 10 | 11 | Rank | Points |
|---|---|---|---|---|---|---|---|---|---|---|---|---|---|---|---|---|---|
| 2014 | Wayne Taylor Racing | P | Dallara Corvette DP | Chevrolet 5.5L V8 | DAY; 2 | SIR | LBH | LS | DET | S6H | MSP | IMS | ELK | COA | PET | 42nd | 33 |

=== International Race of Champions ===
(key) (Bold – Pole position. * – Most laps led.)

International Race of Champions results
| Season | Make | 1 | 2 | 3 | 4 | Pos. | Points | Ref |
|---|---|---|---|---|---|---|---|---|
| 2006 | Pontiac | DAY; 6 | TEX | DAY | ATL; 11 | 9th^{1} | 30 | |

^{1} Ride shared with Max Angelelli

Sporting positions
| Preceded by Trevor van Rooyen | South African National Drivers Championship; 1986 | Succeeded by None |
| Preceded by Juan Manuel Fangio II | IMSA GT champion 1994 | Succeeded by Fermin Velez |
| Preceded by Max Papis; Scott Pruett | Grand-Am Daytona Prototype Champion; 2005 with Max Angelelli | Succeeded by Jörg Bergmeister |
