= Steve Kinser =

American racing driver

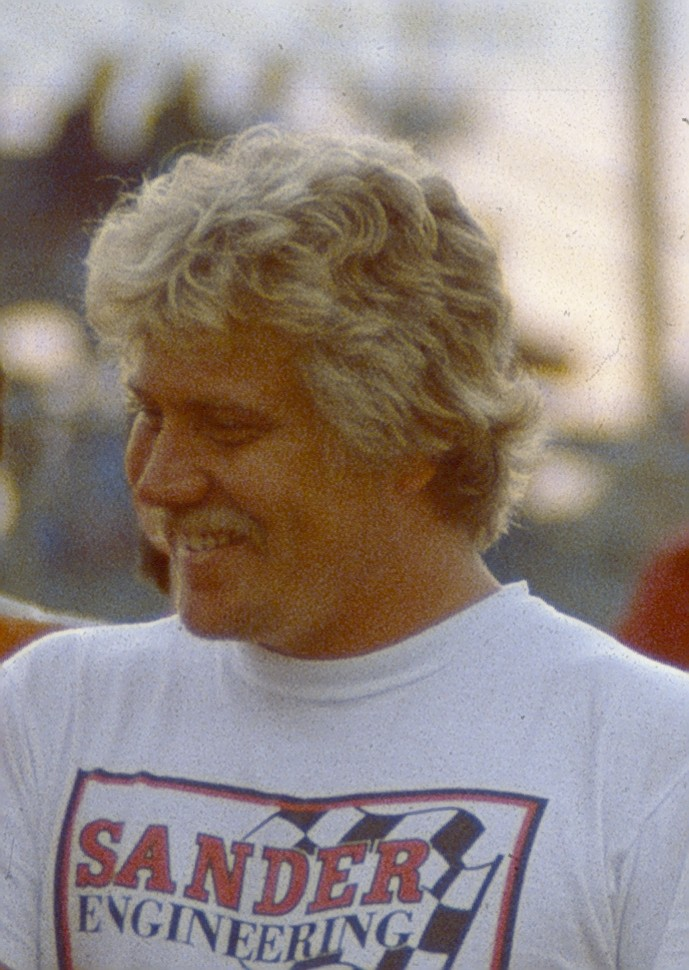
- Kinser in the 1980s
- Born: Dennis Steven Kinser; June 2, 1954 (age 72) Bloomington, Indiana, U.S.

World of Outlaws career
- Debut season: 1978
- Championships: 20
- Wins: 690

Championship titles
- 1978–1980, 1983–1988, 1990–1994, 1998, 2000, 2002–2005: World of Outlaws Sprint Car Series

NASCAR Cup Series career
- 5 races run over 1 year
- Best finish: 49th (1995)
- First race: 1995 Daytona 500 (Daytona)
- Last race: 1995 TranSouth Financial 400 (Darlington)
Wins	Top tens	Poles
0	0	0

IndyCar Series career
- 1 race run over 1 year
- Best finish: 14th (1996–1997)
- First race: 1997 Indianapolis 500 (Indianapolis)
Wins	Podiums	Poles
0	0	0

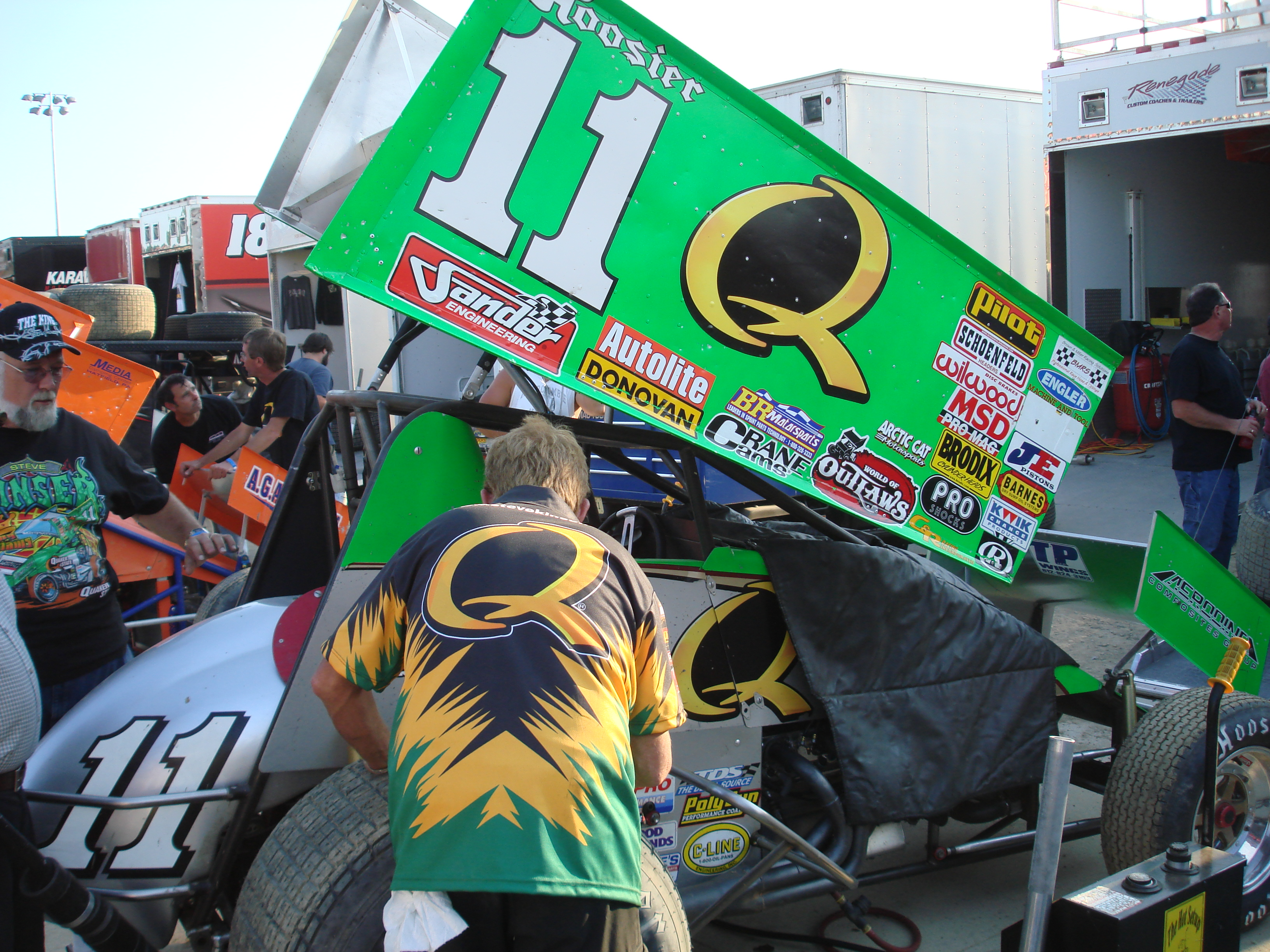
Kinser's 2007 World of Outlaws sprint car at the King's Royal race

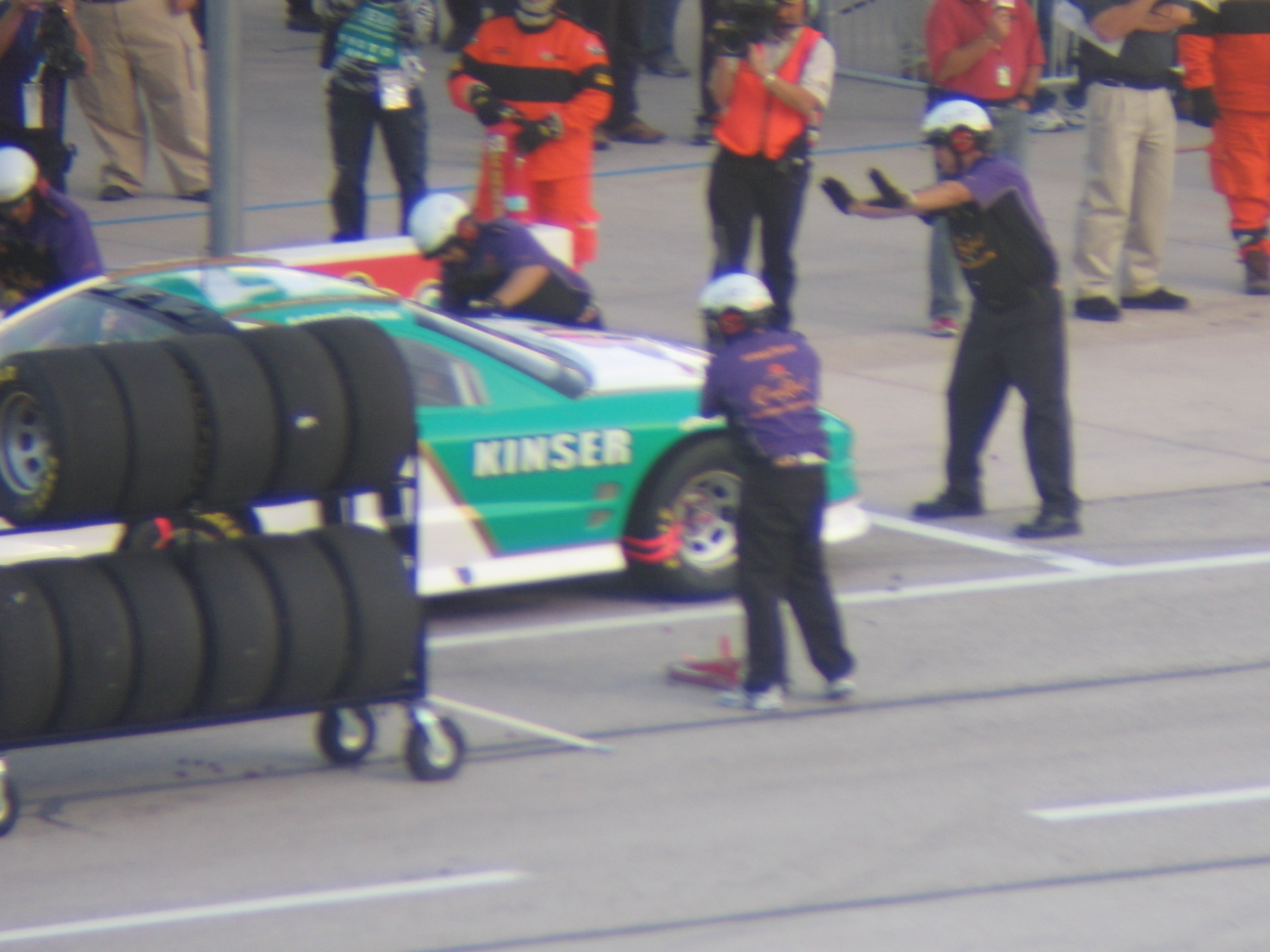
Kinser in a 2006 IROC race at Texas

Dennis Steven Kinser (born June 2, 1954), nicknamed "the King", is a former professional sprint car racing driver. He has won 20 championships in the World of Outlaws (WoO) series. Kinser left the World of Outlaws in 2006 to compete with the National Sprint Tour series, but returned to the World of Outlaws for the 2007 season. ESPN named him 25th on their top drivers of all time in 2008. He was inducted into the Motorsports Hall of Fame of America in 2017.

== Background ==
Kinser was a high school wrestler. He finished second in state as a junior, and was a state champion wrestler as a senior. Both of his sons also wrestled in high school. His youngest son Kurt, won the Indiana state tournament as a senior as well, capping off the Bloomington High School South team's excellent season. Kurt wrestled at Indiana University, competing at the 149 and 157-pound weight classes, and later became a professional mixed martial artist.

After Kinser's win on Saturday May 12, 2012 at the Williams Grove Speedway, Steve became the oldest driver ever to win a World of Outlaws main event at the age of 57, although this record would be broken in May 2021 when Dave Blaney won the World Of Outlaws feature race at Sharon Speedway at age 58.

== World of Outlaws career ==
Kinser became a World of Outlaws driver in 1978. In 1987, he won 46 features, including 12 in a row, and 24 of the last 26 events. He has won the Knoxville Nationals a record 12 times, the Gold Cup Race of Champions 12 times, and the Kings Royal at Eldora seven times. He won twenty WoO championships and 690 "A" features (including full-field preliminary night wins). He was inducted in the National Sprint Car Hall of Fame in 2005. He has been described as the best sprint racer ever by both columnists and even his rivals. In August 2016, Kinser retired from Sprint Car racing.

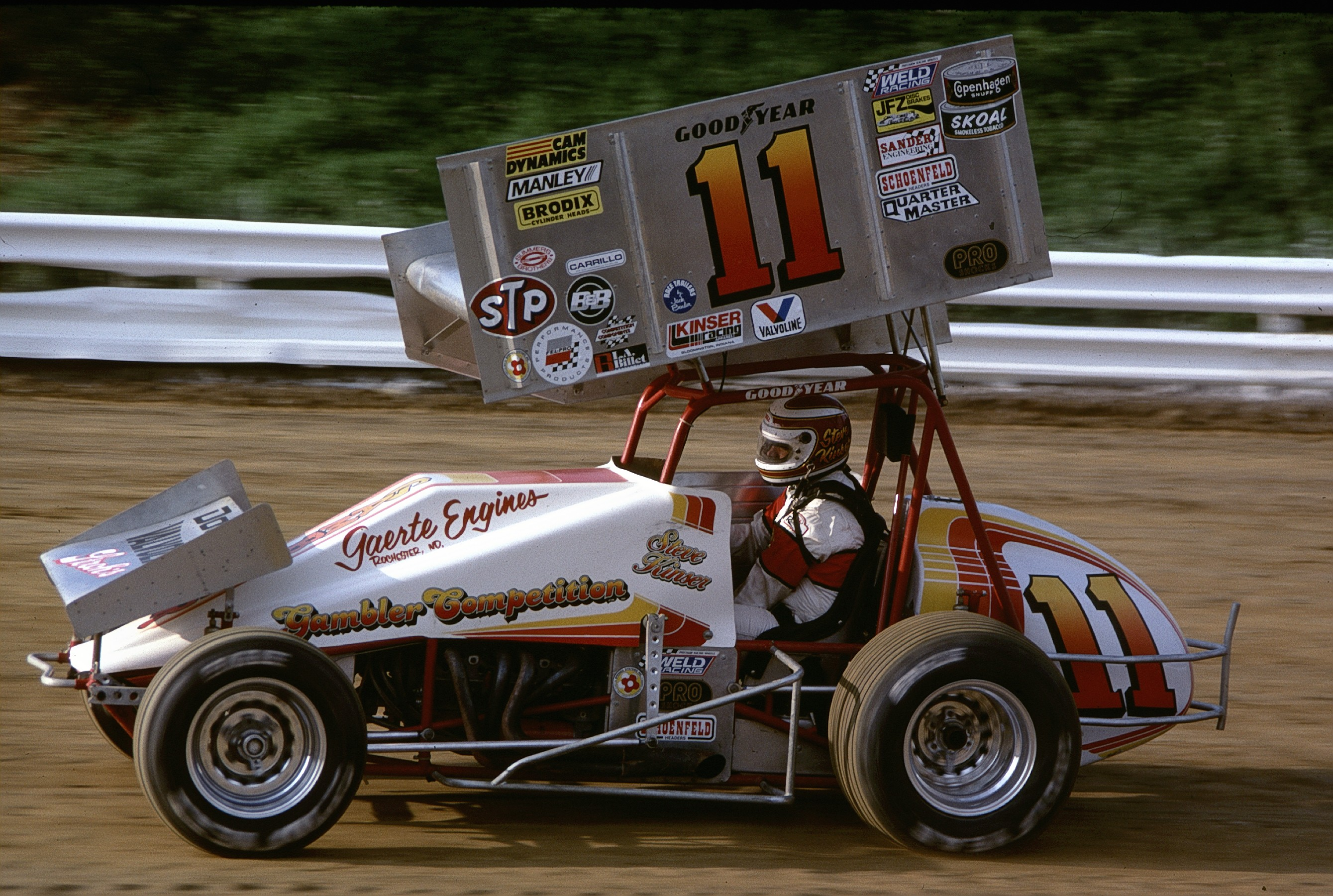
1986 championship sprint car at Williams Grove

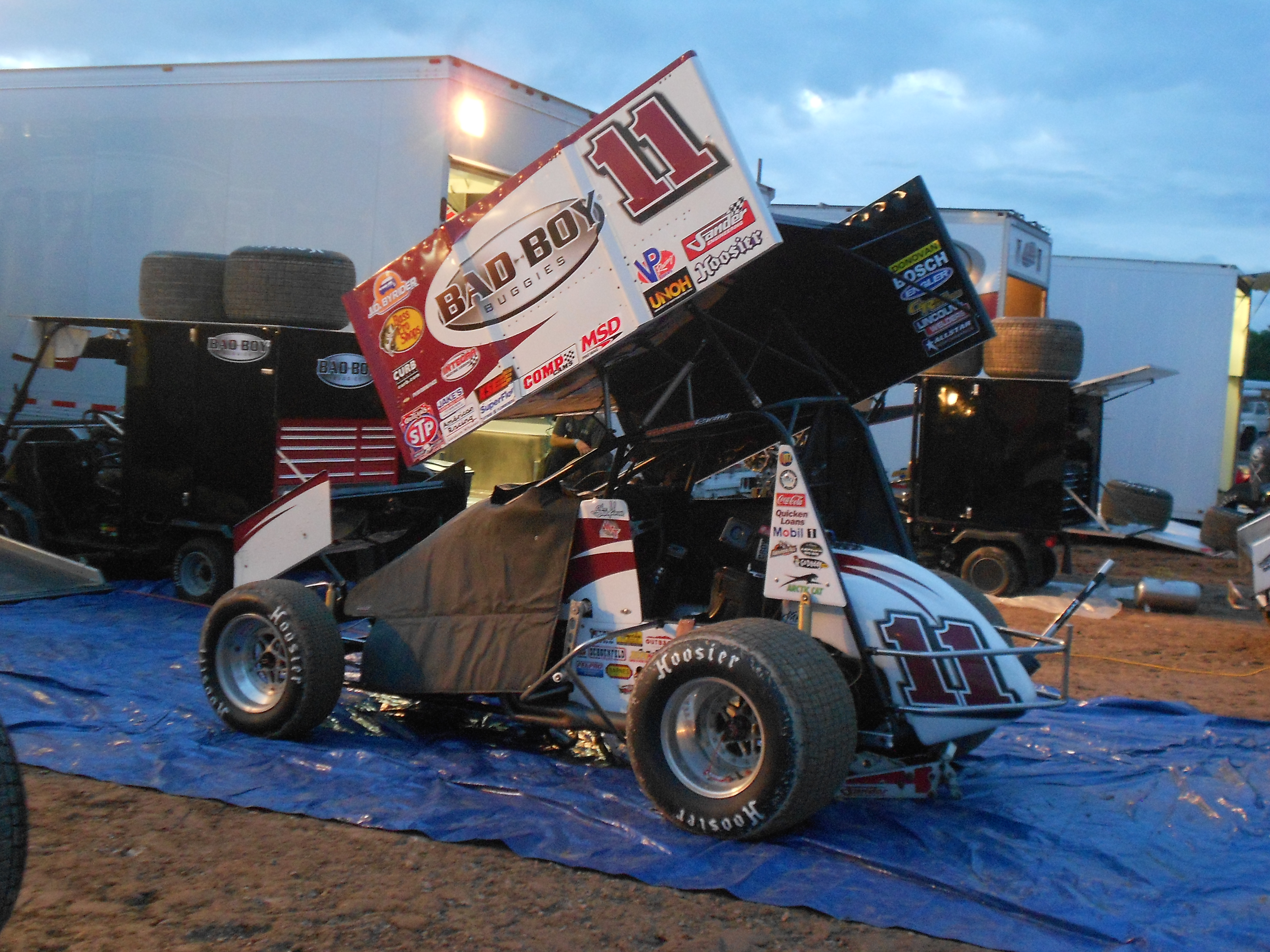
Steve's 2013 car in the pits at the Beaver Dam Raceway.

== Other racing accomplishments ==
In 1981, a 26-year-old rookie, Kinser failed to qualify for the Indianapolis 500 when his month was ended by a practice crash. He returned in 1997 driving a Dallara-Oldsmobile, where he qualified 20th and finished 14th after a late race accident in Turn 4. It was his only Indy Racing League start.

During his many tours of Australia racing Sprint cars, Kinser won many feature races and drew large crowds wherever he raced, but on January 4, 1986, he swapped his Sprinter for a VW-powered Midget (called a Speedcar in Australia) and won the 38th Australian Speedcar Grand Prix at Sydney's Liverpool City Raceway. Kinser began touring Australia in 1979, before returning many times during the 1980s and 1990s, generally teaming with his brother Randy in Gambler chassis Sprint cars distinctively sponsored by cigarette companies, including the black and gold of JPS, and the sky blue and white Commodore brand. In 1985/86, Steve Kinser headlined a four driver tour of Australia which included his brother Randy and cousins Mark and Kelly. The JPS sponsored Kinser's virtually cleaned-up on their 1985/86 Australian tour, winning races at the major speedways in the country against Australia's best drivers including multiple Australian Champions Garry Rush, George Tatnell and Max Dumesny.

Kinser has been selected several times to compete in the International Race of Champions, winning a race at Talladega Superspeedway in 1994. That year, he also finished a career best sixth in IROC points.

In 1995, Kinser landed a NASCAR Winston Cup Series ride as drag racing legend Kenny Bernstein hired Kinser to drive his No. 26 Quaker State Ford, but after the first seven races of 1995, Kinser was released and replaced by Hut Stricklin after posting no wins and no top-tens with an average finish of 35.2 and a best finish of 27th at Rockingham along with three DNF's and two DNQ's.

== Family ==
Kinser's family is also involved in racing, as his younger brother Randy Kinser and cousins Kelly Kinser and Mark Kinser, who was also a championship winning driver on the World of Outlaws circuit. His son Kraig Kinser races for Steve Kinser Racing in the number 11k World of Outlaws sprint car. Kraig won the 2005 Knoxville Nationals. He has two other children, Stevie and Kurt. His second cousin, once removed Sheldon Kinser competed in the CART series and raced in the Indianapolis 500 six times. Steve is the son of Bob Kinser.

Kinser's third cousin Karl Kinser (Mark Kinser's father) was Steve's car owner 1978 to 1994, and was crew chief for Steve and Randy's cars on their frequent tours to Australia in the 1980s. Karl has been the winning car owner and mechanic for 16 World of Outlaws championships and 12 Knoxville Nationals wins. Karl was inducted in the National Sprint Car Hall of Fame. Even though Karl is his third cousin, Steve Kinser often joked to reporters that the pair weren't really related.

== Motorsports career results ==
=== World of Outlaws ===
- 1978: Champion – 11 wins.
- 1979: Champion – 23 wins.
- 1980: Champion – 28 wins.
- 1981: 3rd in points – 23 wins.
- 1982: 2nd in points – 13 wins.
- 1983: Champion – 18 wins.
- 1984: Champion – 19 wins.
- 1985: Champion – 15 wins.
- 1986: Champion – 18 wins.
- 1987: Champion – 46 wins.
- 1988: Champion – 27 wins.
- 1990: Champion – 27 wins.
- 1991: Champion – 36 wins.
- 1992: Champion – 31 wins.
- 1993: Champion – 19 wins.
- 1994: Champion – 29 wins.
- 1995: 9th in points – 18 wins.
- 1996: 4th in points – 10 wins.
- 1997: 3rd in points – 5 wins.
- 1998: Champion – 6 wins.
- 1999: 3rd in points – 11 wins.
- 2000: Champion – 10 wins.
- 2001: 3rd in points – 6 wins.
- 2002: Champion – 20 wins.
- 2003: Champion – 25 wins.
- 2004: Champion 17 wins.
- 2005: Champion – 20 wins.
- 2006: 2nd in points (NST) – 5 wins.
- 2007: 6th in points – 10 wins.
- 2008: 3rd in points – 7 wins.
- 2009: 4th in points – 2 wins.
- 2010: 3rd in points – 9 wins.
- 2011: 3rd in points – 9 wins.
- 2012: 5th in points – 4 wins.
- 2013: 8th in points – 2 wins.
- 2014: 8th in points – 1 win. "Last fulltime season"
- 2015: 19th in points - 0 wins.

=== NASCAR ===
(key) (Bold – Pole position awarded by qualifying time. Italics – Pole position earned by points standings or practice time. * – Most laps led.)

==== Winston Cup Series ====
NASCAR Winston Cup Series results
Year	Team	No.	Make	1	2	3	4	5	6	7	8	9	10	11	12	13	14	15	16	17	18	19	20	21	22	23	24	25	26	27	28	29	30	31	NWCC	Pts	Ref
1993	Folsom Racing	31	Chevy	DAY; DNQ	CAR	RCH	ATL	DAR	BRI	NWS	MAR	TAL; DNQ	SON	CLT	DOV	POC	MCH	DAY	NHA	POC	TAL	GLN	MCH	BRI	DAR	RCH	DOV	MAR	NWS	CLT	CAR	PHO	ATL		NA	-	
1995	King Racing	26	Ford	DAY; 40	CAR; 27	RCH; 28	ATL; 41	DAR; 40	BRI; DNQ	NWS; DNQ	MAR	TAL	SON	CLT	DOV	POC	MCH	DAY	NHA	POC	TAL	IND	GLN	MCH	BRI	DAR	RCH	DOV	MAR	NWS	CLT	CAR	PHO	ATL	49th	287	

===== Daytona 500 =====
Year	Team	Manufacturer	Start	Finish
1993	Folsom Racing	Chevrolet	DNQ	
1995	King Racing	Ford	42	40

=== American open-wheel racing results ===
(key) (Races in bold indicate pole position) (Races in italics indicate fastest lap)

==== Indy Racing League ====
Indy Racing League results
Year	Team	1	2	3	4	5	6	7	8	9	10	Rank	Points	Ref
1996–97	Sinden Racing Services	NHA	LVS	WDW	PHX	INDY; 14	TEX	PPR	CLT	NHA	LVS	44th	21	

==== Indianapolis 500 ====
Year	Chassis	Engine	Start	Finish	Team
1981	Penske	Cosworth	DNQ		Stanton Racing Products
1997	Dallara	Oldsmobile	20	14	Sinden Racing Services

Sporting positions
Preceded by None	World of Outlaws Champion; 1978–1980	Succeeded by Sammy Swindell
Preceded by Sammy Swindell	World of Outlaws Champion; 1983–1988	Succeeded by Bobby Davis Jr.
Preceded by Bobby Davis Jr.	World of Outlaws Champion; 1990–1994	Succeeded by Dave Blaney
Preceded by Sammy Swindell	World of Outlaws Champion; 1998	Succeeded by Mark Kinser
Preceded by Mark Kinser	World of Outlaws Champion; 2000	Succeeded by Danny Lasoski
Preceded by Danny Lasoski	World of Outlaws Champion; 2002–2005	Succeeded by Donny Schatz
