= International Race of Champions =

Auto racing championship held in the United States

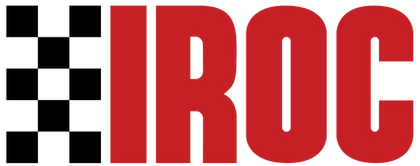
- Category: Stock car racing
- Country: United States
- Inaugural season: 1973
- Folded: 2006
- Drivers: 12
- Constructors: Porsche, Chevrolet, Dodge, Pontiac
- Last Drivers' champion: (United States) Tony Stewart
- Official website: https://www.iroc-racing.com/

International Race of Champions (IROC) was a North American auto racing competition, created by David Lockton, Les Richter, Roger Penske and Mike Phelps, promoted as an American-motorsports equivalent of an all-star game. Despite its name, IROC was primarily associated with North American oval track racing.

Drivers raced identically-prepared stock cars set up by a single team of mechanics in an effort to make the race purely a test of driver ability. It was run with a small field of 12 invited drivers. It was created and developed in 1972 by David Lockton, the developer of the Ontario Motor Speedway, launched in 1973, with Mark Donohue being the first driver to win the championship, in 1974. The cars used that year were Porsche Carrera RSRs. Donohue's win in the fourth and last race of that season was his last win, as he died in a Formula One crash at the Österreichring in practice for the 1975 Austrian Grand Prix. The series was not run in 1981, 1982, or 1983.

In 2007, IROC could not find a sponsor and postponed the first two races, at Daytona and Texas. IROC went on hiatus in 2007 hoping to return with a sponsor in 2008, which did not happen. In March 2008, IROC auctioned off its tools, equipment, cars, and memorabilia, and went out of business. On January 8, 2024, Ray Evernham alongside Rob Kauffman announced the series would relaunch in 2024 with the intent of one race while exploring future opportunities afterwards. There are 43 current cars listed in the IROC Registry for the vintage series. Among the owners of the cars are Kurt Busch, Rick Hendrick, Tomy Drisi, Ray Evernham, Ken Schrader, Bobby Labonte, Mark Martin, Richard Childress, and Zak Brown. The 2026 schedule includes races at Ten Tenths Motor Club, WeatherTech Raceway Laguna Seca, and the Freedom 250 Grand Prix.

== Drivers ==
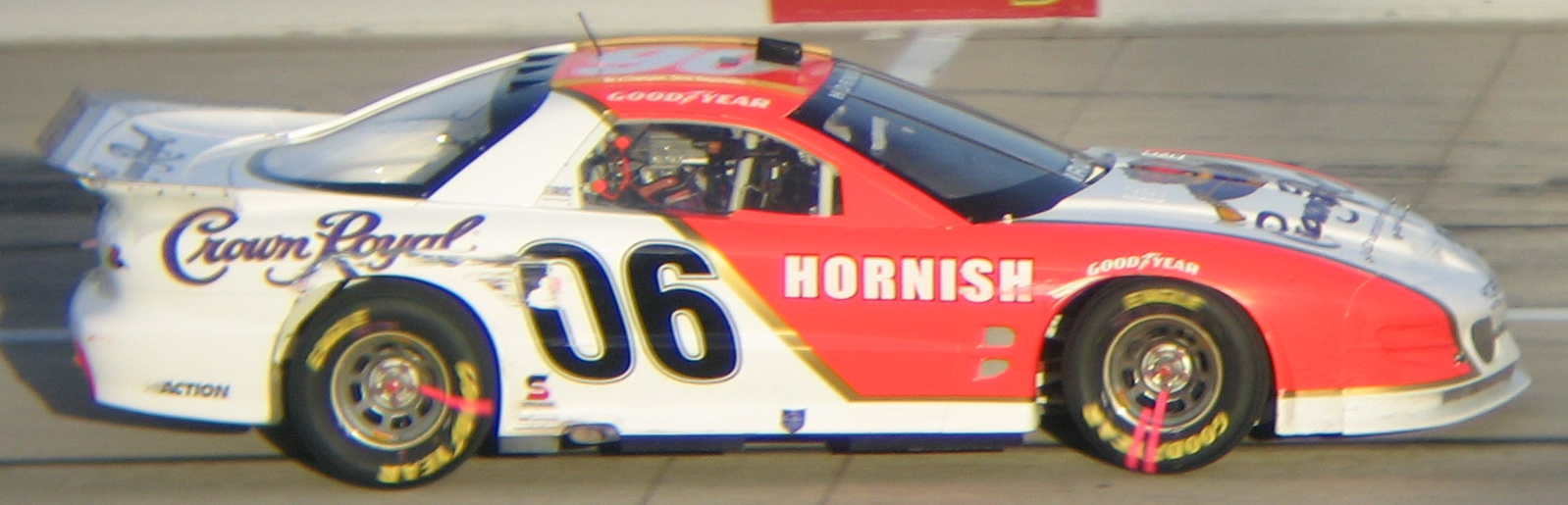
Sam Hornish Jr. competing in a 2006 IROC race at Texas Motor Speedway

The drivers invited were from a broad range of racing disciplines: IndyCar, NASCAR, sports car racing, and on occasion, sprint car racing. Criteria for invitation was very loose, but typically consisted of recent season champions of the respective series, and individual winners of big events (Indy, Daytona, etc.) It was occasionally rumored that a top NHRA drag racer would be invited and compete, but none ever did.

Due to its fundamental stock car formula, and the majority of racing being contested on ovals, the series was often dominated by NASCAR participants (which was the major criticism of the series). Also, in the small field of about a dozen cars, the share of NASCAR invitees grew over time; from just three drivers in the first season to seven in the final season. The last non-NASCAR based champion of the series was Al Unser Jr. in 1988. Although open-wheel car drivers had numerous successes, as of 2005, drivers from road racing series had only won two races in the history of IROC. In some years, no sports car drivers competed.

== Car identification ==
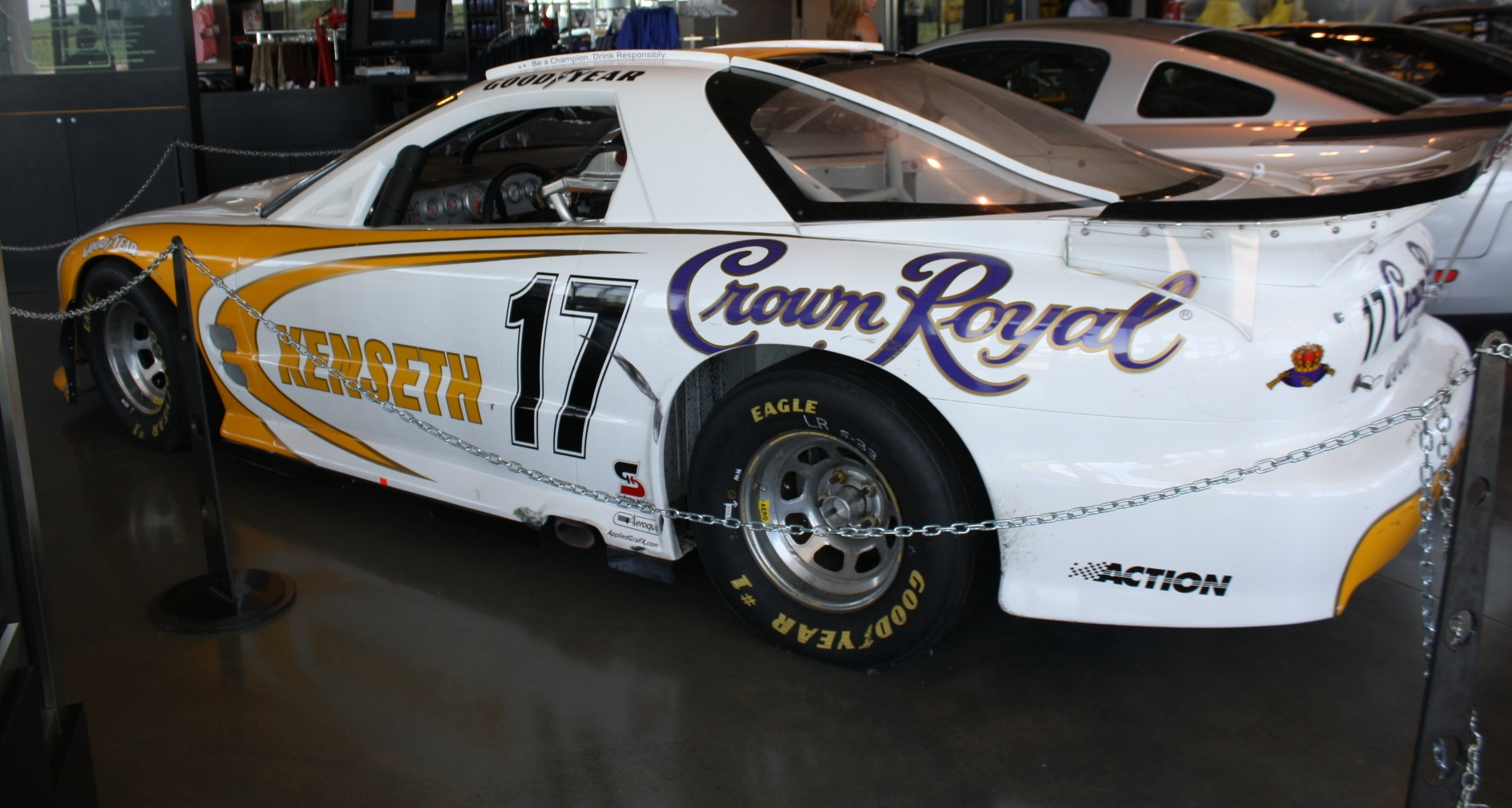
Matt Kenseth's 2004 championship car

Through 2003, IROC was also known for its rainbow of car colors being easily recognized from all other racing series. Car numbers were utilized for scoring purposes, but were not the primary means of identification. Instead, the driver's surname would appear on the door of the car. Exceptions were made when Mario and Michael Andretti raced in the same events. In those cases, their first name was used. The numbers would change from race to race, with the number 1 being given to the driver starting first, and so on. The colors would correspond to the numbers. Before the races, drivers were assigned via blind drawing, as was how the starting grid for the first race was determined. The finishing order of the race would be inverted for the second race's starting grid, while the reverse of the points standings determined races three and four's grids. Numbers were assigned by the starting position. After the first race, the numbers were assigned based on points standings.

In 2004, the alcoholic beverage company, Diageo became the series' title sponsor, utilising their Crown Royal brand whiskey, replacing True Value, and the procedure changed as well. Cars would be identically painted in white, with trim which could be changed to represent the driver's colors in his regular racing series. Also, a driver's number in IROC would be his regular number. Thus, Steve Kinser would use green trim with the No. 11, and Matt Kenseth's car featured yellow trim with No. 17.

The only exception to the numbering scheme involved the number 3. Following the death of Dale Earnhardt in the 2001 Daytona 500, IROC retired the use of No. 3. Any driver with that regular number would use No. 03 instead. Hélio Castroneves raced with No. 03, but the car kept red trim, in reflection of his IndyCar being red.

If there was a numbering conflict, another number would be substituted. In most cases, for one-digit numbers, a zero would be added in front. Otherwise a historically notable number would be run. (Penske drivers, for instance, could use No. 66, owing to Mark Donohue.)

== Road racing ==
From its inception to 1991, the series contested at least one race per season on a road course. Riverside held the most IROC road races, followed by Watkins Glen. Races were also contested at Mid-Ohio, the Daytona combined road course, and the Cleveland (Cleveland Burke Lakefront Airport) CART series course.

From 1992 to 2005, the IROC season was exclusively run on ovals. In 2006, road courses were reintroduced to the IROC series with the cars competing on the road course at Daytona International Speedway. Also, in 2006, two drivers shared one car in an IROC first. Grand-Am Road Racing drivers Max Angelelli and Wayne Taylor each drove two races in 2006, trying to win the IROC title as a team, reflecting sportscar racing as a two-man team. However, in 2007, that may not have been used, as 2006 Grand American Road Racing champion Jörg Bergmeister was a solo champion. Bergmeister had to split driving duties with various drivers because his regular co-driver was forced to sit out three races because they were raced with the Indy Racing League; Colin Braun, who was 17, could not race in those three races under Tobacco Master Settlement Agreement rulings.

== Legacy ==
The International Race of Champions series was beloved by NASCAR and international fans alike, as drivers from several different disciplines could be seen competing on a level playing field. During the hiatus of motorsports due to the COVID-19 pandemic in 2020, a group of drivers from NASCAR, NHRA, IndyCar, IMSA, Supercross, Supercars Championship, Formula One, and Rallycross competed in iRacing in dirt modifieds, GTE cars, and stock cars in an event dubbed a "tribute to IROC".

In 2021, final IROC champion Tony Stewart and Ray Evernham launched Superstar Racing Experience (SRX) based on the IROC concept of identical cars and an all-star cast of drivers from different racing series.

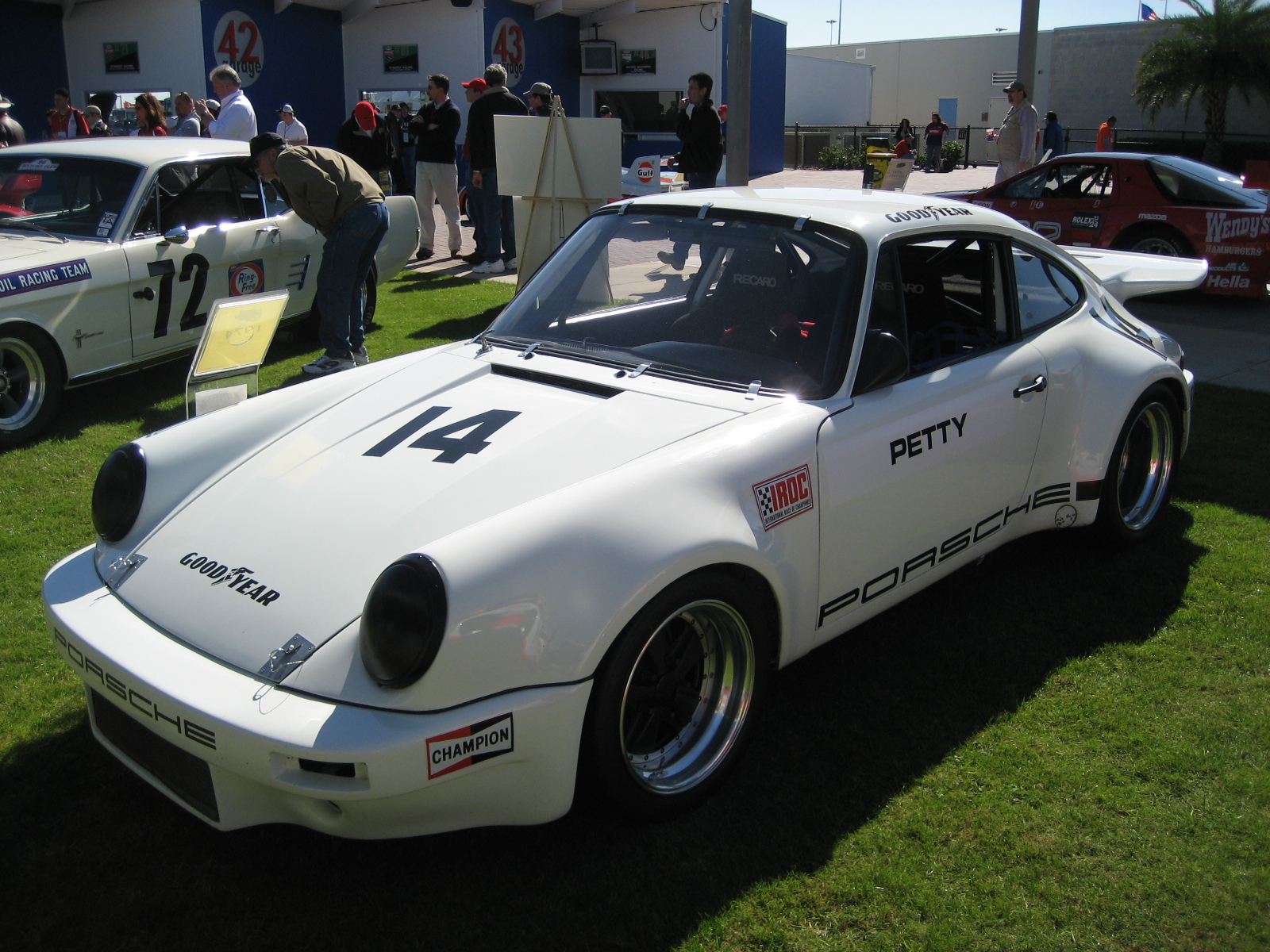
Richard Petty's IROC Porsche 911 from 1974

== Points system ==
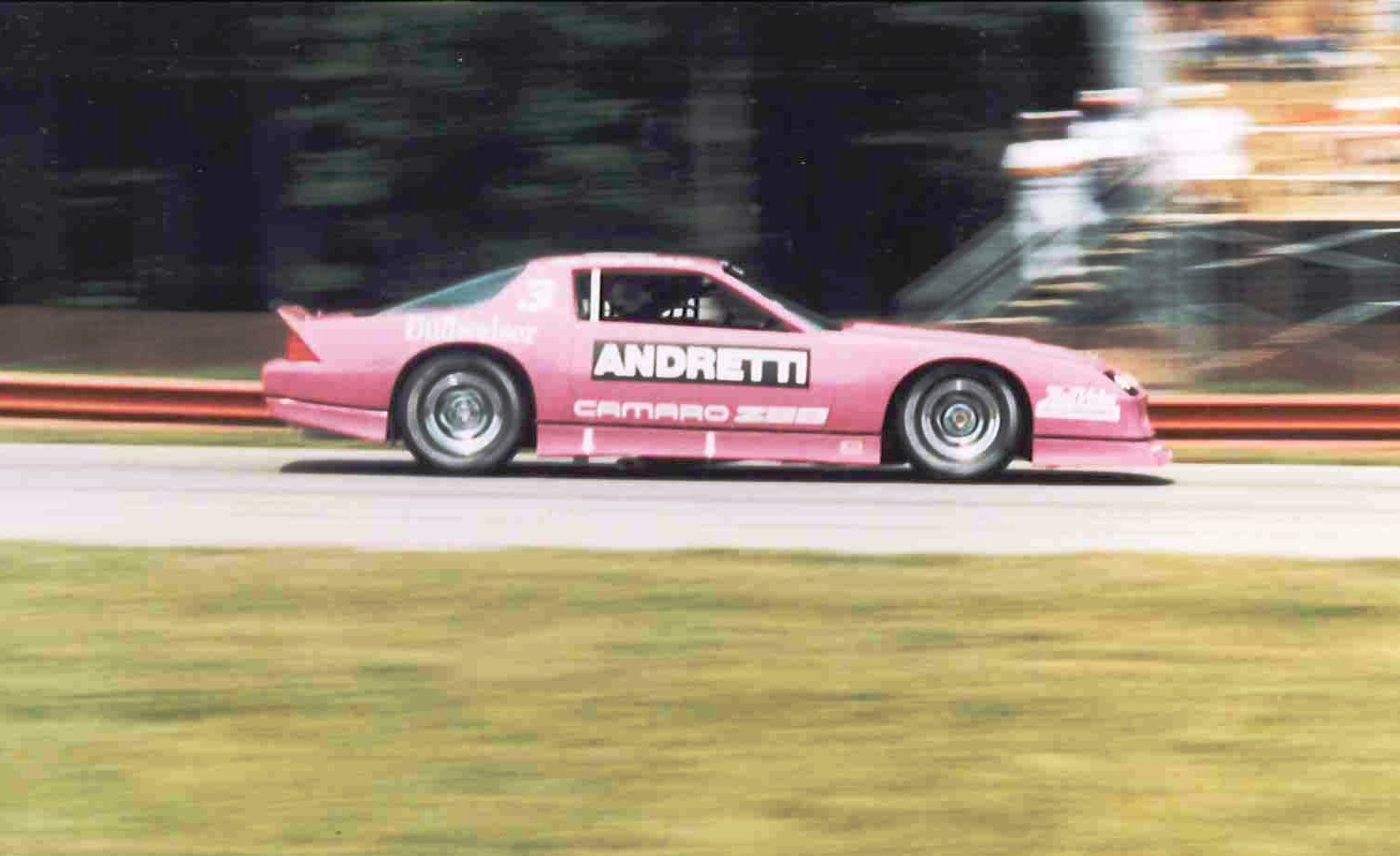
Mario Andretti in IROC race at Mid-Ohio (1985)

Pos.	Points
1st	21
2nd	17
3rd	14
4th	12
5th	10
6th	9
7th	8
8th	7
9th	6
10th	5
11th	4
12th	3
Bonuses
Most laps led	5
2nd-most laps led	3
3rd-most laps led	2

=== Purse ===
Pos.	Purse
Champion	$225,000
2nd	$100,000
3rd	$60,000
4th	$50,000
5th	$45,000
6th–12th	$40,000

== Champions ==
Season	Year	Champion	Car
I	1974	(United States) Mark Donohue	Porsche Carrera RSR
II	1975	(United States) Bobby Unser	Chevrolet Camaro
III	1976	(United States) A. J. Foyt (1-2)	Chevrolet Camaro
IV	1977	(United States) A. J. Foyt (1-2)	Chevrolet Camaro
V	1978	(United States) Al Unser	Chevrolet Camaro
VI	1979	(United States) Mario Andretti	Chevrolet Camaro
VII	1980	(United States) Bobby Allison	Chevrolet Camaro
VIII	1984	(United States) Cale Yarborough	Chevrolet Camaro
IX	1985	(United States) Harry Gant	Chevrolet Camaro
X	1986	(United States) Al Unser Jr. (1)	Chevrolet Camaro
XI	1987	(United States) Geoff Bodine	Chevrolet Camaro
XII	1988	(United States) Al Unser Jr. (2)	Chevrolet Camaro
XIII	1989	(United States) Terry Labonte	Chevrolet Camaro
XIV	1990	(United States) Dale Earnhardt (1)	Dodge Daytona
XV	1991	(United States) Rusty Wallace	Dodge Daytona
XVI	1992	(United States) Ricky Rudd	Dodge Daytona
XVII	1993	(United States) Davey Allison	Dodge Daytona
XVIII	1994	(United States) Mark Martin (1)	Dodge Avenger
XIX	1995	(United States) Dale Earnhardt (2)	Dodge Avenger
XX	1996	(United States) Mark Martin (2-4)	Pontiac Trans Am
XXI	1997	(United States) Mark Martin (2-4)	Pontiac Trans Am
XXII	1998	(United States) Mark Martin (2-4)	Pontiac Trans Am
XXIII	1999	(United States) Dale Earnhardt (3-4)	Pontiac Trans Am
XXIV	2000	(United States) Dale Earnhardt (3-4)	Pontiac Trans Am
XXV	2001	(United States) Bobby Labonte	Pontiac Trans Am
XXVI	2002	(United States) Kevin Harvick	Pontiac Trans Am
XXVII	2003	(United States) Kurt Busch	Pontiac Trans Am
XXVIII	2004	(United States) Matt Kenseth	Pontiac Trans Am
XXIX	2005	(United States) Mark Martin (5)	Pontiac Trans Am
XXX	2006	(United States) Tony Stewart	Pontiac Trans Am

- 1985: Three races only as the third scheduled race was cancelled due to rain.
- 1990: Three races only because of new sponsor, Dodge and the late start to the season (Talladega, Cleveland, Michigan). After Darrell Waltrip was injured in a crash at Daytona in practice for the NASCAR Pepsi 400 the day before the Cleveland IROC race, he was not replaced for the final two races.
- 1993: Davey Allison was killed in a helicopter crash after three races had been completed, and only the final race, at Michigan International Speedway, was remaining. Terry Labonte was asked to drive the final race, and Allison's and Labonte's points combined were enough for the IROC championship. Labonte's winnings went to a trust fund for Allison's two children, Krista and Robbie. Alan Kulwicki had been killed in a plane crash earlier in the year after two races had been run, and Dale Earnhardt was chosen to replace him to complete a 12-driver field, with all winnings going to charities chosen by the Kulwicki family.
- 2001: After Dale Earnhardt was killed in the Daytona 500, IROC went to only eleven cars for the remaining three races. Following a 2004 rule change in IROC where drivers would be using their personal numbers, IROC added one exception – the number 3 could not be used. Any driver whose number in a series is 3 would have to have used 03 in IROC.
- 2005: With the 2005 IROC title and the subsequent termination of the series, Martin now is the all-time leader in IROC Championship titles with five. Also during the 2005 season, Martin took over the all-time record for IROC wins with thirteen.

=== Number of years raced by car ===
Car	Years
Chevrolet Camaro	12
Pontiac Trans Am	11
Dodge Daytona	4
Dodge Avenger	2
Porsche Carrera RSR	1

== See also ==
- Race of Champions
- Race of Champions (Brands Hatch)
- Fast Masters
- Grand Prix Masters
- Superstar Racing Experience
