= Crown Royal =

Blended Canadian whisky

- Type: Canadian whisky
- Manufacturer: Diageo
- Origin: Canada
- Introduced: 1939 (Canada); 1964 (US and other countries)
- Proof (US): 80
- Variants: Deluxe, Limited Edition, Special Reserve, XO, XR, Black, Maple, Regal Apple, Honey, Northern Harvest Rye, Salted Caramel, Vanilla, Blackberry, Peach
- Website: crownroyal.com

Crown Royal, originally known as Seagram's Crown Royal, is a blended Canadian whisky brand created by Seagram and owned by British multinational conglomerate Diageo since 2000.

The whisky was introduced in 1939 by Samuel Bronfman for the 1939 royal tour of Canada. The whisky was sold exclusively in Canada until the 1960s, when it was first introduced to international markets. It is the top-selling brand of Canadian whisky in the United States.

== Origins ==
Crown Royal was introduced in 1939 by Samuel Bronfman, president of Seagram, as a tribute to the 1939 royal tour of Canada by King George VI and his wife, Queen Elizabeth, the first visit of a reigning monarch to Canada. It was available only in Canada until 1964, when it was introduced to international markets.

== Production ==
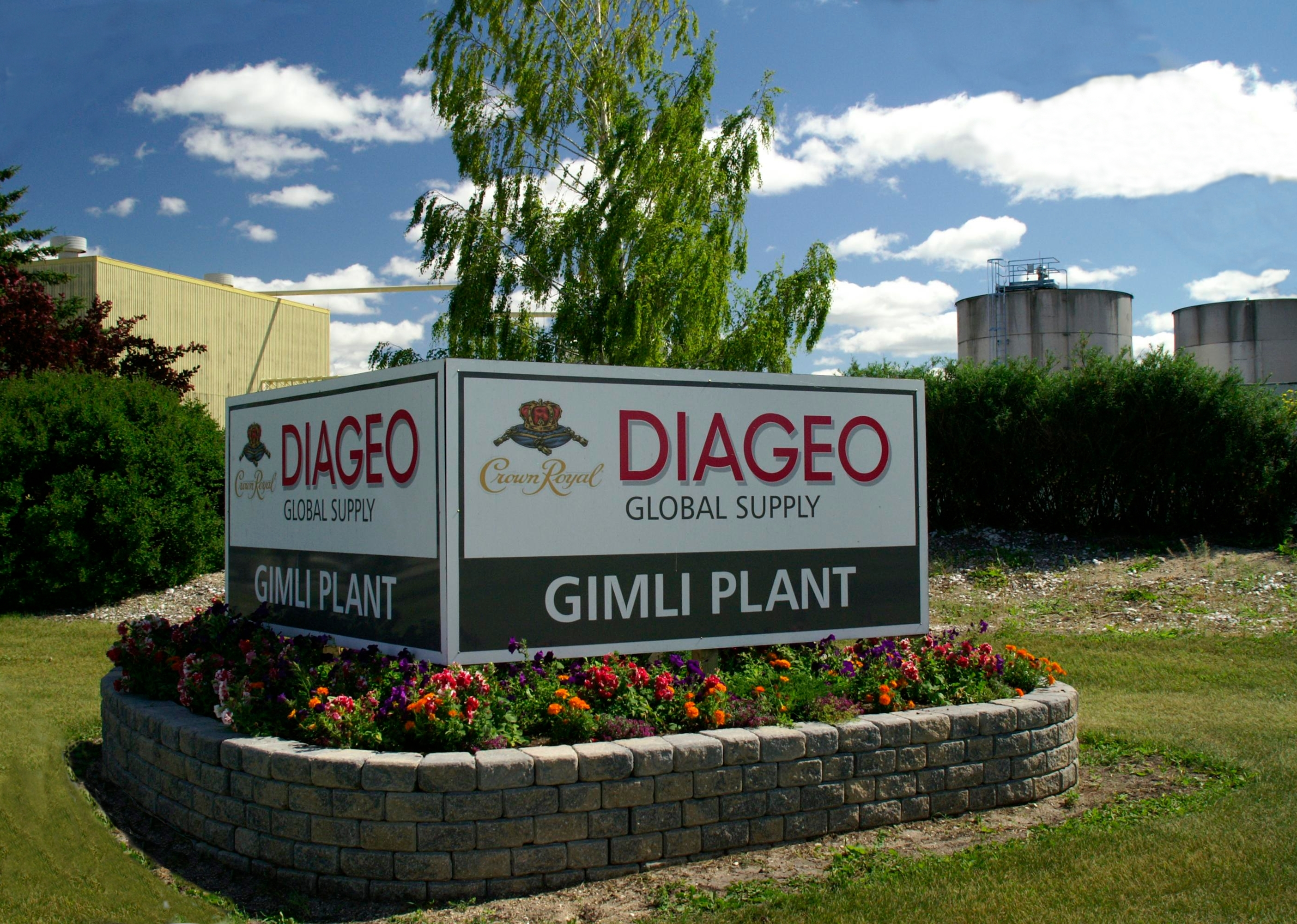
Distillery in Gimli, Manitoba

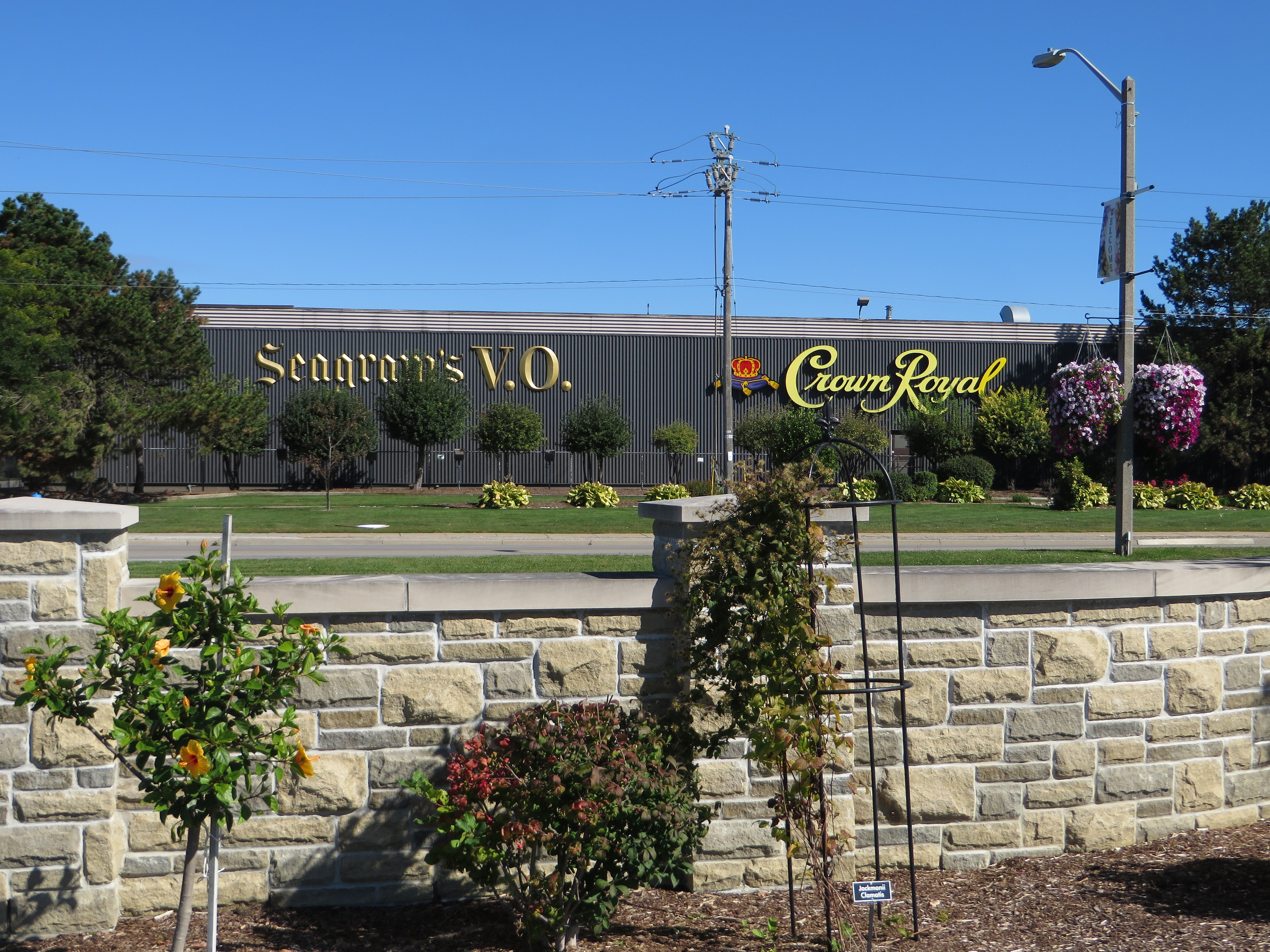
Blending and bottling plant in Amherstburg, Ontario

Crown Royal is produced solely at the company's distillery at Gimli, on the shores of Lake Winnipeg, Manitoba, Canada. The production of Crown Royal uses 10,000 imperial bushels (360 m^{3}) of rye, maize and barley daily, sourced from Manitoba and surrounding provinces, and requires 750,000 imperial gallons (3,400 m^{3}; 900,000 US gal) of water naturally filtered through the limestone beneath the lake.

The whisky is stored in 1.7 million barrels, in 56 warehouses over 5 acres (2 ha) of land. It is then blended and bottled in Amherstburg, Ontario.

Crown Royal was also produced at the Waterloo distillery in Ontario and the LaSalle distillery in Montreal, until they were closed in the early 1990s.

The whisky was bottled in facilities in Amherstburg, Ontario, and Valleyfield, Quebec. The Amherstburg plant closed in February 2026, with bottling for the United States moved to the US, and Crown Royal for Canada and non-US export markets continuing to be bottled at the Valleyfield plant. This move was heavily criticized by local leaders, including Ontario premier Doug Ford.

== Products ==
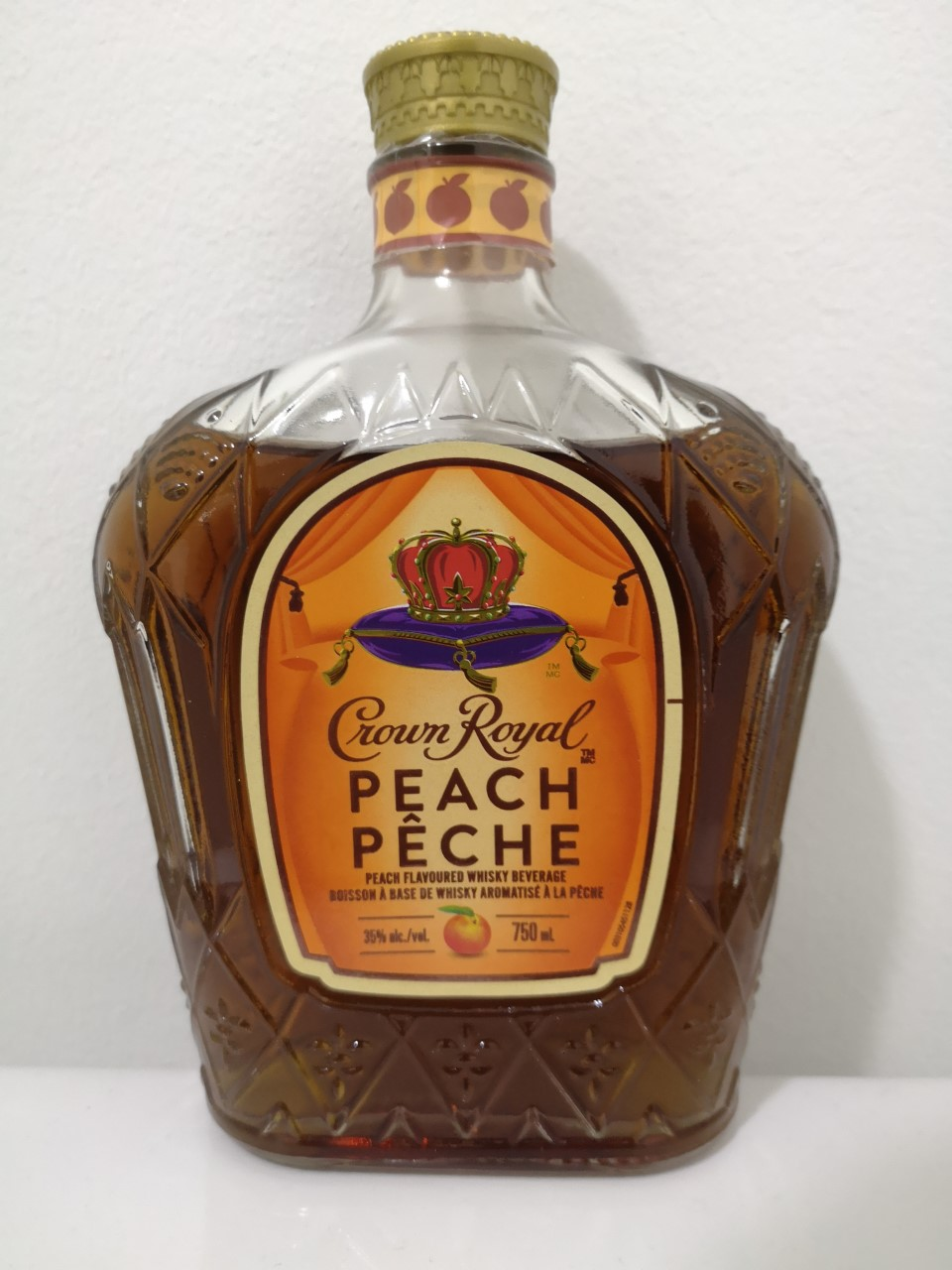
Crown Royal Peach was introduced in 2019.

Products available in 2026 include:

- Crown Royal was introduced in 1939 and is the original version of the brand. It was available only in Canada until 1964. Crown Royal is supplied in a purple felt-like bag with a gold tasseled drawstring.
- Crown Royal Reserve was introduced in 1992. The whiskies are aged for longer than the original. Crown Royal Reserve is supplied in a tan, velvet-like bag with coarse gold drawstrings.
- Crown Royal Black was introduced in 2010, and is a darker, higher-alcohol (45% alcohol by volume) whisky. Supplied in a black felt-like bag.
- Crown Royal XO was introduced in January 2014. It is a blend of 50 whiskies that is then finished in cognac casks from the French Limousin forest. It is packaged in a bag with grey and gold embroidery accents.
- Crown Royal Regal Apple was introduced in November 2014. It is a blend of Crown Royal with apple flavour. Sold in a green felt-like bag.
- Crown Royal Northern Harvest Rye was introduced in May 2015, and is packaged in an off-white felt-like bag.
- Crown Royal Vanilla was introduced in 2016 and is supplied in a tan felt-like bag.
- Crown Royal Salted Caramel Supplied in a burnt-orange felt-like bag. (winter seasonal)
- Crown Royal Peach was introduced in early 2019 and is supplied in a peach felt-like bag.
- Crown Royal Blackberry was introduced in early 2024 and is supplied in a dark purple bag with red accents.
- Crown Royal Single Malt Whisky, the first Crown Royal single malt, was introduced in June 2024.
- Crown Royal Marquis, introduced in 2025 as a whisky finished in Caribbean rum casks.

=== Discontinued products ===
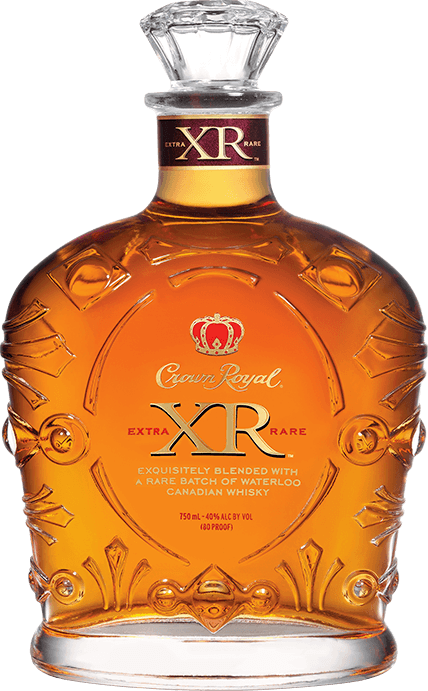
A bottle of Crown Royal XR (Red), a discontinued variation of the whisky

- Crown Royal XR (Red) The first edition of Crown Royal XR contained the final batch of aged whiskies from the Waterloo distillery.
- Crown Royal XR (Extra Rare) was introduced in 2006. This limited-release version was sold in numbered bottles and was originally made from the last batches of whisky distilled at the now-closed Waterloo, Ontario, distillery, later using whisky from the also closed Lasalle, Quebec, distillery. It received 7¼ and 7¾ ratings from Whisky Magazine critics. The LaSalle-based Crown Royal XR used a blue colour scheme to distinguish it from the red scheme of the original Waterloo-based version.
- Crown Royal Cask No. 16 was introduced in late 2007. It was made from over fifty blended and individually aged whiskies in 12-year-old cognac barrels made of oak from the Limousin forest in France. The whiskies were designed to have a cognac type of finish with notes of rye, grain, and fruit. Cask No. 16 was supplied in a black felt-like bag embroidered with the logo and name "CASK No 16". This blend was discontinued in late 2012.
- Crown Royal Monarch 75th Anniversary Blend was introduced in 2014 to commemorate the 1939 royal visit that inspired the brand, and was prepared as a gift for the royal family.
- Crown Royal Hand Selected Barrel was introduced in May 2015, and is a single barrel rye produced by the brand's Coffey rye still, the only one of its kind in North America.
- Crown Royal Texas Mesquite was introduced in 2018 and was supplied in a blue felt-like bag.
- Crown Royal Honey was introduced in 2016.
- Crown Royal Maple Finished
- Crown Royal Golden Apple

== Ratings ==
Crown Royal offerings have generally performed well at international spirit ratings competitions. For example, the basic Canadian whisky was awarded a string of five gold medals at the San Francisco World Spirits Competitions between 2005 and 2012. The Special Reserve received an editor's choice gold award from Whisky Magazine and received ratings from 7¾ to 8¾ from three of the critics.

Jim Murray's "Whisky Bible" named Crown Royal's Northern Harvest Rye as the World Whisky of the Year for 2016.

== Advertising ==
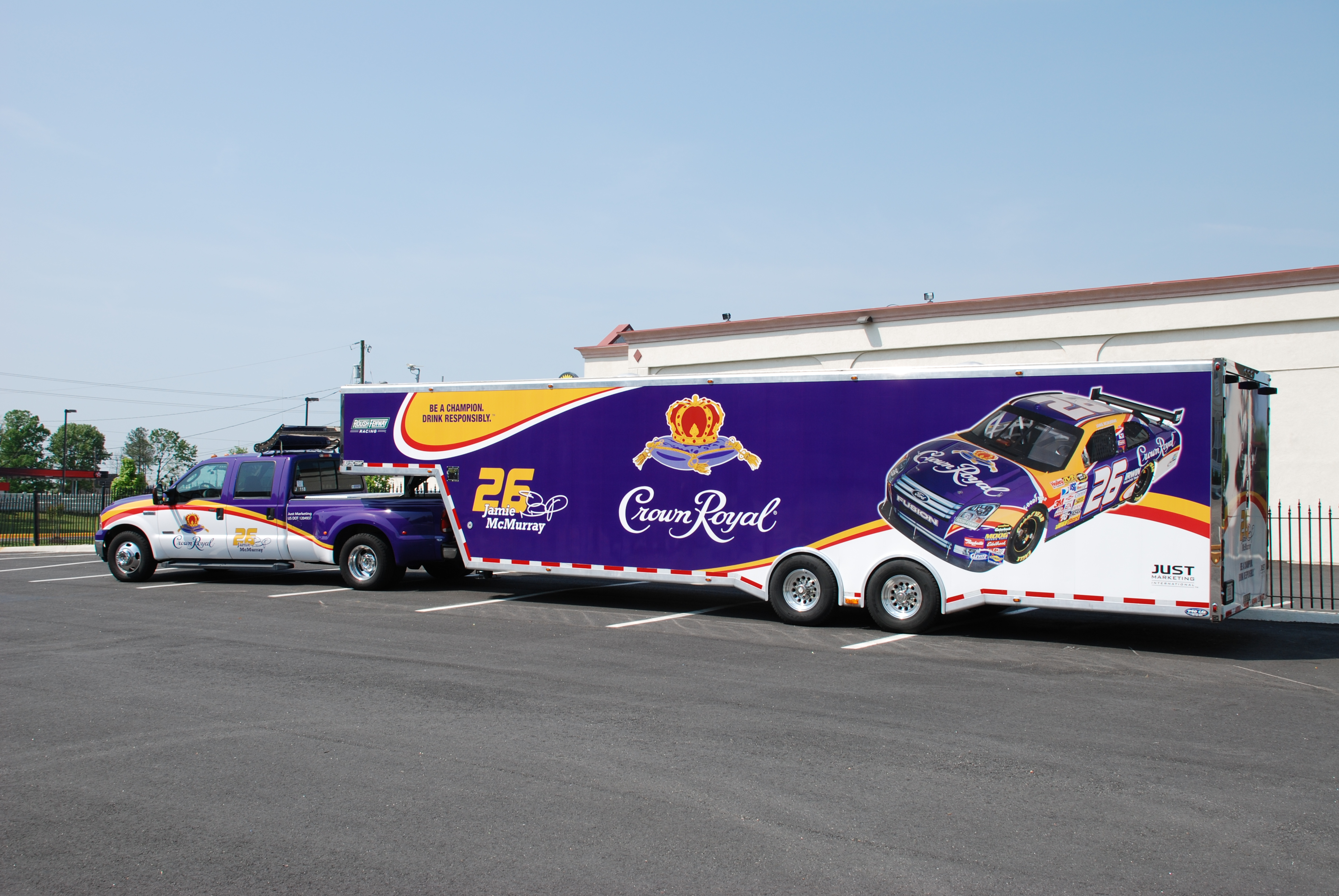
Crown Royal-sponsored hauler of Jamie McMurray's NASCAR stock car

Crown Royal advertises in motor sports, horse shows, and horse racing. It sponsored the No. 17 Ford Fusion of Matt Kenseth from 2010 to 2011 and the No. 26 Ford Fusion of Jamie McMurray from 2006 to 2009. It has sponsored NASCAR Sprint Cup Series races since 2006. From 2004 until 2006, Crown Royal was the title sponsor of the International Race of Champions.

Crown Royal is a sponsor of the Grand American Road Racing Association's Rolex Sports Car Series. In 2010, it also began sponsoring the No. 60 Daytona Prototype car of Michael Shank Racing in the Rolex Sports Car Series.

The brand was a primary sponsor of the Washington International Horse Show for several years in the 1990s, and from 1995 to 2008 sponsored the Crown Royal American Turf Stakes, a Thoroughbred horse race run at Churchill Downs on Kentucky Derby Day.

In June 1996, Seagram aired a 30-second commercial for Crown Royal on KRIS-TV, an NBC affiliate in Corpus Christi, Texas, United States. The spot, which showed one dog holding a diploma and another carrying a bottle of the whisky, broke the Distilled Spirits Council of the United States's voluntary ban on broadcast liquor advertising, in place since 1948 for television. The commercial drew criticism from the Federal Communications Commission and groups such as Mothers Against Drunk Driving, and US President Bill Clinton urged Seagram to reconsider. On November 7, 1996, the council ended the ban and adopted voluntary advertising guidelines.
