= NASCAR Hall of Fame Class of 2026 ballot =

Nominees for the NASCAR Hall of Fame

- May 20, 2025

Three new members were voted in to the NASCAR Hall of Fame on May 20, 2025, from a list of nominees provided by NASCAR. The nominees are split into two categories, the Modern Era, and the Pioneer Era.

The final decision was made by the NASCAR Hall of Fame voting panel, who will also decide the winner of the Landmark Award. A fan vote was also held from April 21 to May 18.

Kurt Busch and Harry Gant were chosen from the Modern Era ballot, while Ray Hendrick was chosen from the Pioneer Era ballot. They were officially inducted on January 23, 2026.

== Process ==
The nominees were selected by representatives from NASCAR, the NASCAR Hall of Fame, track owners, and media. The 22-member Nomination Committee selects 10 nominees for the Modern Era ballot, and the Honors Committee selects the 5 nominees for the Pioneer Era ballot.

== Modern Era ==
The two new nominees on the ballot are Kurt Busch and Randy Lajoie.

=== Inducted ===
Nominee	Image	Years active (Note: In any NASCAR sanctioned series)	Position	Achievements
Kurt Busch		2000–2022	Driver	2004 cup champion, 34 Cup Series wins, 2017 Daytona 500 winner
Harry Gant		1973–1996	Driver	18 Cup Series wins, two-time Southern 500 wins

=== Nominated ===
Nominee	Image	Years active (Note: In any NASCAR sanctioned series)	Position	Achievements
Greg Biffle		1996–2022	Driver	2000 Craftsman Truck Series and 2002 NASCAR Busch Series champion, 19 NASCAR Cup Series wins
Neil Bonnett		1974–1993	Driver	18 Cup Series wins, two-time Coca-Cola 600 winner
Tim Brewer		1978–2007	Crew chief	53 Cup Series wins, two-time Southern 500 winner
Jeff Burton		1988–2014	Driver	21 Cup Series wins, two-time Coca-Cola 600 and one-time Southern 500 winner
Randy Dorton		1970s—2004	Engine builder	Built engines for cars that won nine NASCAR national series championships
Harry Hyde		1965–1996	Crew chief	1970 NASCAR Grand National Series champion, 55 Cup Series wins
Randy Lajoie		1984–2006	Driver	1996 and 1997 NASCAR Busch Series champion, 15 Busch Series wins
Jack Sprague		1989–2008	Driver	Three-time Craftsman Truck Series champion, 28 Truck Series wins

=== Analysis ===
Despite appearing on the ballot for the first time, Kurt Busch has been considered a favorite by Bob Pockrass, who is a voting member of the panel, various writers for Frontstretch, and Motorsport.com reporter Kevin DeGroot, who also considers Randy Dorton as a favorite.

== Pioneer Era ==
Jake Elder returned to the ballot for the first time since 2021.

=== Inducted ===
Nominee	Image	Years active (Note: In any NASCAR sanctioned series)	Position	Achievements
Ray Hendrick		1953–1983	Driver	Over 700 late model and modified wins

=== Nominated ===
Nominee	Image	Years active (Note: In any NASCAR sanctioned series)	Position	Achievements
Jake Elder		1960s–1990s	Crew chief	Three-time Cup Series champion, 44 Cup Series wins
Banjo Matthews		1952–1985	Driver, owner, crew chief	Several wins as an owner, prolific car builder in the 1970s and 80s
Larry Phillips		1976–2001	Driver	Five-time NASCAR Weekly Racing Series champion
Bob Welborn		1953–1964	Driver	Three-time NASCAR Convertible Division champion, 9 Cup Series wins
