= Kurt Busch =

American racing driver (born 1978)

- Busch at Las Vegas Motor Speedway in 2026
- Born: Kurt Thomas Busch; August 4, 1978 (age 48); Las Vegas, Nevada, U.S.
- Height: 5 ft 11 in (1.80 m)
- Weight: 160 lb (73 kg)
- Achievements: 2004 Nextel Cup Series Champion; 2003 IROC Champion; 2010 Coca-Cola 600 Winner; 2010 NASCAR Sprint All-Star Race Winner; 2011 Budweiser Shootout Winner; 2017 Daytona 500 Winner; 1999 NASCAR Featherlite Southwest Tour Champion; Has won a race with four engine suppliers (Chevrolet, Dodge, Ford, and Toyota)
- Awards: 2000 Craftsman Truck Series Rookie of the Year; 2014 Indianapolis 500 Rookie of the Year; Named one of NASCAR's 75 Greatest Drivers (2023); West Coast Stock Car Hall of Fame (2023); NASCAR Hall of Fame (2026)

NASCAR Cup Series career
- 776 races run over 23 years
- 2022 position: 30th
- Best finish: 1st (2004)
- First race: 2000 MBNA.com 400 (Dover)
- Last race: 2022 Ambetter 301 (New Hampshire)
- First win: 2002 Food City 500 (Bristol)
- Last win: 2022 AdventHealth 400 (Kansas)
Wins	Top tens	Poles
34	339	28

NASCAR O'Reilly Auto Parts Series career
- 30 races run over 5 years
- 2013 position: 104th
- Best finish: 39th (2006)
- First race: 2006 O'Reilly 300 (Texas)
- Last race: 2013 Subway Firecracker 250 (Daytona)
- First win: 2006 O'Reilly 300 (Texas)
- Last win: 2012 Subway Jalapeño 250 (Daytona)
Wins	Top tens	Poles
5	23	3

NASCAR FedEx Freight Truck Series career
- 28 races run over 3 years
- 2012 position: 87th
- Best finish: 2nd (2000)
- First race: 2000 Daytona 250 (Daytona)
- Last race: 2012 Fred's 250 (Talladega)
- First win: 2000 Sears DieHard 200 (Milwaukee)
- Last win: 2000 Motorola 200 (California)
Wins	Top tens	Poles
4	20	4

IndyCar Series career
- 1 race run over 1 year
- 2014 position: 25th
- Best finish: 25th (2014)
- First race: 2014 Indianapolis 500 (Indianapolis)
Wins	Podiums	Poles
0	0	0
- Statistics up to date as of November 6, 2022.

Kurt Thomas Busch (born August 4, 1978) is an American retired professional stock car racing driver. He is best known for competing in the NASCAR Cup Series from 2000 to 2022, last driving the number 45 Toyota Camry TRD for 23XI Racing. Busch is the 2004 NASCAR NEXTEL Cup Series champion and the 2017 Daytona 500 winner. He is the brother of the late Kyle Busch, a two-time Cup Series champion.

Busch began his NASCAR Cup Series career in 2000, driving for teams including 23XI Racing, Chip Ganassi Racing, Stewart–Haas Racing, Furniture Row Racing, Phoenix Racing, Penske Racing, and Roush Racing. He has won 34 Cup races and claimed the championship in the inaugural "Chase for the Cup" points format. In 2006, he joined an elite group of 36 drivers to win races in all three of NASCAR's top divisions: the Cup Series, Xfinity Series, and Camping World Truck Series. Early in his career, Busch gained attention for his aggressive driving and clashes with competitors, team members, and the media. Over time, he became known for helping his teams enhance their programs.

Beyond stock car racing, Busch has competed in the Indianapolis 500, the 24 Hours of Daytona, and the National Hot Rod Association. In 2023, he was named one of NASCAR's 75 Greatest Drivers. He was also elected to the NASCAR Hall of Fame for their Class of 2026 in his first year of eligibility.

== Racing career ==
=== Beginnings ===
Busch began his racing career at age 14 in a Dwarf car at Pahrump Valley Speedway, introduced to the sport by his father. He also competed in IMCA Modified racing early in his career.

Busch's big break came under unfortunate circumstances when Chris Trickle, a promising driver, was critically injured in an unsolved shooting and later died. Trickle's No. 70 team, sponsored by Star Nursery, sought a replacement driver, giving Busch the opportunity to step in. He gained national attention in the 1997 Winter Heat Series at Tucson Speedway, competing against notable drivers like Ron Hornaday Jr., Matt Crafton, Greg Biffle, and Kevin Harvick.

In 1998, Busch won Rookie of the Year in the NASCAR AutoZone Elite Division, Southwest Series, and went on to secure the series championship in 1999. His success earned him a spot in the Roush Racing "Gong Show", where he won a Craftsman Truck Series ride. Driving the No. 99 Ford F-150, Busch achieved four victories, finished second in the championship standings to teammate Greg Biffle, and was named Rookie of the Year.

=== NASCAR ===
==== Roush Racing ====
===== 2000–2005 =====
Roush Racing announced during the 2000 season that Busch would bypass the Busch Series for the Winston Cup Series for 2001, replacing Chad Little in the No. 97 Ford. Little was released early, allowing Busch to take over the No. 97 John Deere Ford at Dover in September 2000. Busch competed in seven of the final eight races that season, with Jeff Hammond as his crew chief, while Little drove at Talladega. Busch's best finish during this stint was thirteenth at Charlotte.

Busch began the 2001 season driving an unsponsored car after John Deere ended its sponsorship of the No. 97 car following 2000. Later that year, Roush Racing secured a multi-year deal with Rubbermaid, with its Sharpie marker brand becoming Busch's primary sponsor. Busch recorded three Top 5 finishes and six Top 10 finishes during the season. In the 2001 Daytona 500, Busch had a notable encounter with Dale Earnhardt. On lap 85, the two made door-to-door contact, prompting Earnhardt to flash Busch a middle-finger gesture at 185 mph (298 km/h). The moment, captured by Fox Sports replay cameras, led broadcaster Mike Joy to comment, "Kurt, you're number one." Reflecting on the incident, Busch described it as his only on-track interaction with Earnhardt, who died in a crash on the race's final lap. Up until Busch's final race in 2022, he remained the last active driver to have raced against Earnhardt in the Cup Series.

Busch secured his best finish of the season with a 3rd-place result at the spring Talladega race, just three weeks after earning his first career top-five at Texas (fourth). He also claimed a fifth-place finish in the Brickyard 400 at Indianapolis. However, his season was marred by misfortune, particularly in the second half. At the Southern 500 in Darlington, he led 74 laps before crashing out. At Martinsville, he led 38 laps but suffered a cut tire in heavy traffic, causing significant damage. At Rockingham, overheating issues hindered his performance despite leading 45 laps. He also failed to qualify for the penultimate race in Atlanta. Busch wrapped up the season with a 21st-place finish at the postponed race in New Hampshire, ending 27th in points and second to Kevin Harvick in the Rookie of the Year standings.

The 2002 season marked Busch's breakout year in the Winston Cup Series. He secured his first victory at the Food City 500 in Bristol, outdueling Jimmy Spencer on worn tires. Busch went on to win at Martinsville in October, Atlanta the following week, and the season finale at Homestead, totaling four wins. He also achieved twelve top-five finishes, twenty top-ten finishes, and one pole position, finishing third in the final points standings and US$5,105,394 in prize money. Busch dominated the end of the season, winning three of the final five races and leading laps in the other two. He became the first driver in NASCAR history to win the most races in his first winning season, a record later matched by Carl Edwards in 2005.

Busch had a mixed season in 2003. He secured four wins, including a season sweep at Bristol, becoming the first driver to achieve this since Rusty Wallace in 2000. Despite these victories, inconsistent performances later in the year caused him to fall out of the top ten in points, finishing 11th overall with nine Top 5 finishes and 14 Top 10s. However, he earned over US$5 million for the season. Busch also played a role in NASCAR history during the Carolina Dodge Dealers 400 at Darlington on March 16. In the closing laps, he and Ricky Craven battled intensely for the lead, both wrestling with loose cars. Busch held the lead entering the final corner, but Craven drew nearly even exiting Turn 4. The two cars repeatedly made contact as they raced to the finish line. Craven edged Busch by just .002 seconds, marking the closest finish in NASCAR history at the time.

In 2004, Busch won three races, earned two poles, and captured the inaugural NASCAR Nextel Cup Championship, the first season to feature "The Chase for the Championship". He achieved his fourth consecutive win at Bristol by taking the Food City 500 in March, marking his third straight victory in that event. Busch also became the second driver to sweep both races at New Hampshire Motor Speedway in a single season. However, the championship almost slipped away during the final race at Homestead. On lap 93, Busch reported a flat right-front tire and entered the access road leading to pit road. As he approached the pits, the wheel came off his car, causing him to veer sharply left and narrowly avoid hitting the yellow barrels at the pit road entrance. If he had struck the barrels, his championship hopes would have been over. The loose wheel brought out a caution, but Busch recovered, regained his position, and secured the title. He ended the season with ten top-five finishes and 21 top-ten finishes.

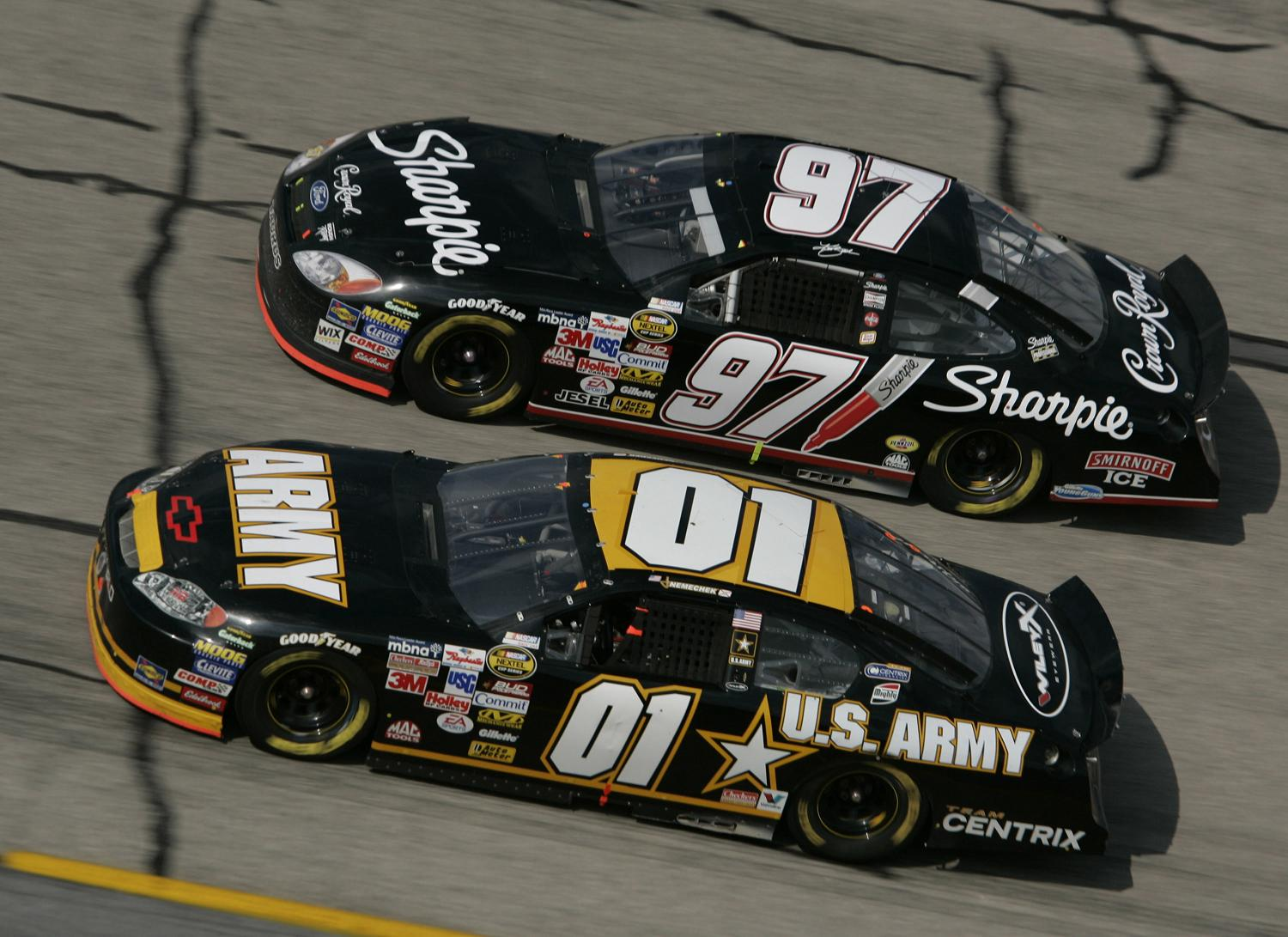
Busch (97) and Joe Nemechek (01) at Talladega Superspeedway in 2005

In 2005, midway through the season, Busch announced that he would be leaving Roush Racing at the end of the year to replace Rusty Wallace in the No. 2 Miller Lite Dodge for Penske Racing South. Initially, Roush was upset with Busch's decision, but the situation changed when Chip Ganassi Racing revealed that Jamie McMurray wanted to join Roush Racing in 2006. As a result, Roush agreed to release Busch. Although Busch had asked team owner Jack Roush to let him out of his contract at the end of 2005, Roush initially refused. However, when it became clear that Busch had already signed a contract with Roger Penske, Roush decided to let him go. Busch's final race with Roush Racing was at Texas, after which he was sidelined for the last two races of the season due to a NASCAR suspension following an incident with the police. Busch had a strong 2005 season, winning three races, earning nine top-five finishes, and eighteen top-ten finishes in 34 races. He also posted an average finish of 15.3, which helped him finish tenth in the final points standings.

==== Penske Racing ====
===== 2006–2011 =====
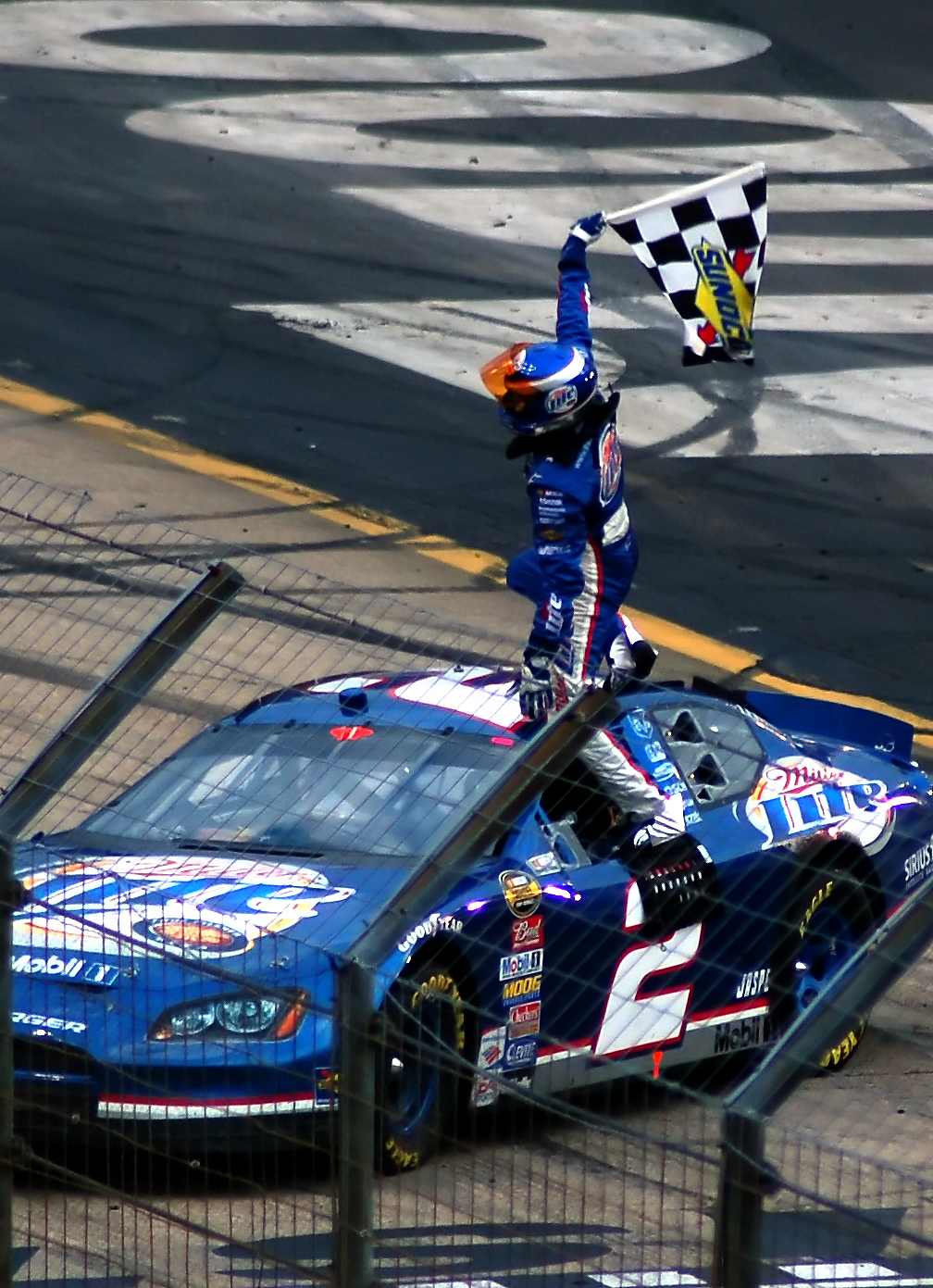
Busch celebrating after winning the 2006 Food City 500

In the 2006 season, driving for Penske Racing, Busch won the Food City 500 at Bristol Motor Speedway, his fifth win at the track. He celebrated by making a snow angel on the track due to the snow that weekend. Busch also secured six poles, seven top-five finishes, and twelve top-ten finishes, but finished the season sixteenth in the points standings. He made his Busch Series debut for Penske in the No. 39 Dodge at Texas, winning in his first race. Busch added a second win at Watkins Glen by holding off Robby Gordon on the final lap. He compared the battle to his 2003 Darlington finish against Ricky Craven, where he lost by just an inch. Busch missed the Chase for the first time in 2006.

In the 2007 season, Busch secured two wins, one pole, five top-five finishes, and ten top-ten finishes over 26 races, earning a spot in the Chase for the Sprint Cup. His on-track performance improved significantly after Pat Tryson joined as his crew chief midway through the season. Additionally, Busch competed in four more Busch Series races, achieving two top-five finishes and three top-ten finishes.

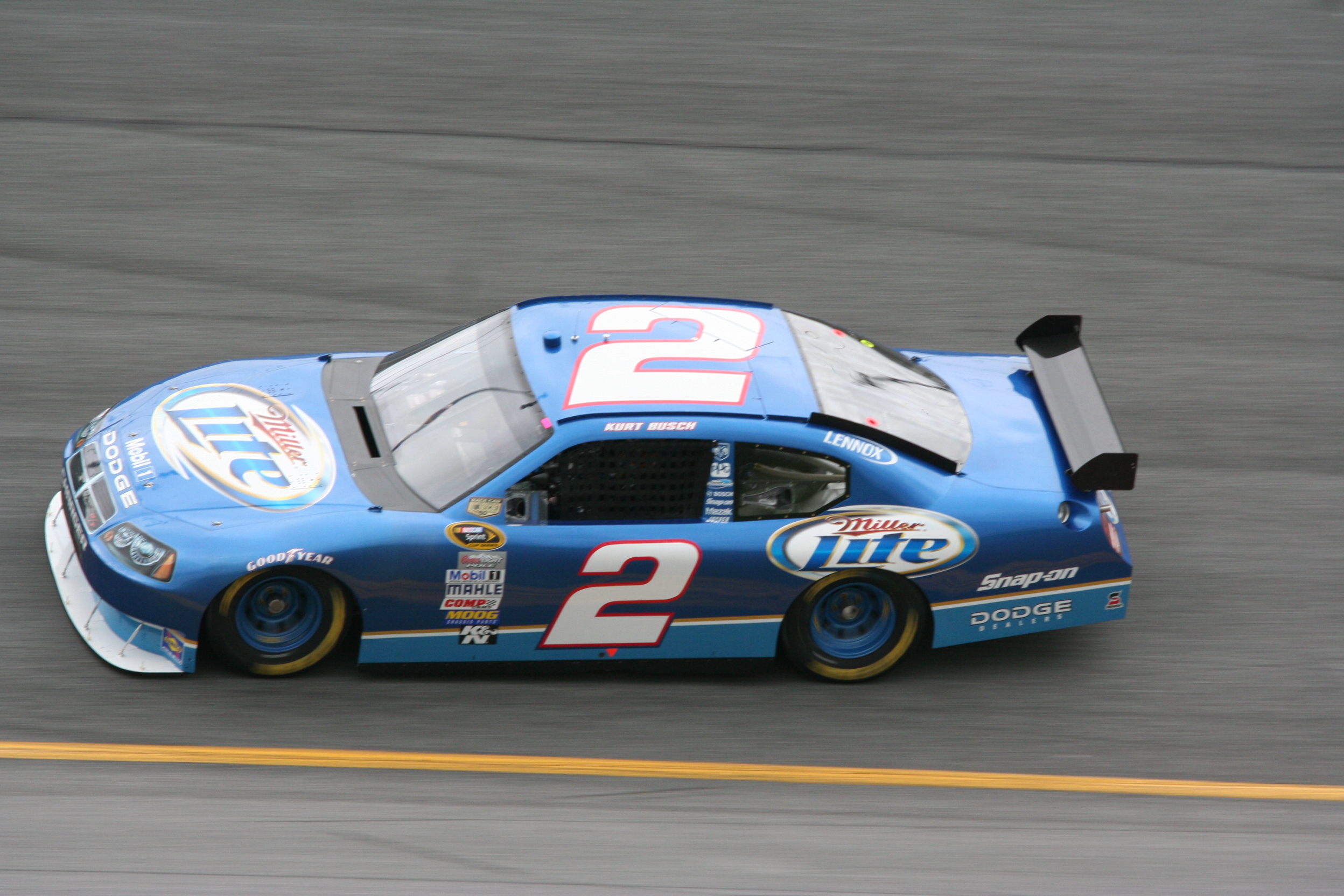
Kurt Busch's 2008 Sprint Cup Series racecar

In 2008, to guarantee rookie Sam Hornish Jr. a starting spot in the first five races, points from Busch's No. 2 car were transferred to Hornish's No. 77. Busch was still assured a spot due to NASCAR's Champion's Provisional Rule, which automatically qualifies the most recent series champion—Busch, with his 2004 title—if they're not in the Top 35 of owner points. During the 2008 Daytona 500, Busch had a fast car and was in contention for the win. On the final lap, he pushed teammate Ryan Newman past Joe Gibbs Racing drivers Tony Stewart and Kyle Busch, allowing Newman to win. It was Penske's first Daytona 500 victory and made him one of the few owners to win both the Indianapolis 500 and Daytona 500. On June 29, 2008, Busch broke a 29-race winless streak with a rain-shortened victory at New Hampshire, his first win since Michigan in 2007 and his eighteenth career win. Despite the victory, Busch missed the Chase and finished 18th in points.

Busch began his 2009 season at the Daytona 500, where he was involved in a wreck on lap 124 when Dale Earnhardt Jr. swerved into Brian Vickers. Vickers hit the wall, ricocheted into Denny Hamlin, who then collided with Busch. Kurt spun into the grass with eight other drivers, including his brother Kyle. After multiple pit stops, he finished tenth. Busch, along with others, believed Earnhardt's contact was intentional and called for a penalty, but NASCAR did not penalize him. Busch qualified 4th for the next race at Auto Club Speedway, finishing 5th, which moved him up to third in points. He dominated the 2009 Kobalt Tools 500, leading 235 of 325 laps and securing his 19th Sprint Cup victory. At Las Vegas, he shared a touching moment with his brother Kyle after Kyle's win, with Darrell Waltrip calling it "the most touching thing I have ever seen." Kurt remained in the top-five for the rest of the season, qualified for the Chase, and finished fourth, the highest-ranked driver not with Hendrick Motorsports. He earned another victory at the 2009 Dickies 500 after Kyle ran out of fuel with two laps to go.

In 2010, Steve Addington became Busch's crew chief after two seasons with Kyle Busch, where he helped secure fourteen wins. Addington replaced Pat Tryson, who left to join Michael Waltrip Racing. On May 22, 2010, Kurt won the NASCAR Sprint All-Star Race and followed it with a victory in the Coca-Cola 600, becoming just the seventh driver to win both in the same year. Busch made the Chase, seeded fifth in points, and finished an impressive seventh at Daytona in the Coke Zero 400 despite three wrecks in the final twelve laps. He finished eleventh in the Chase standings.

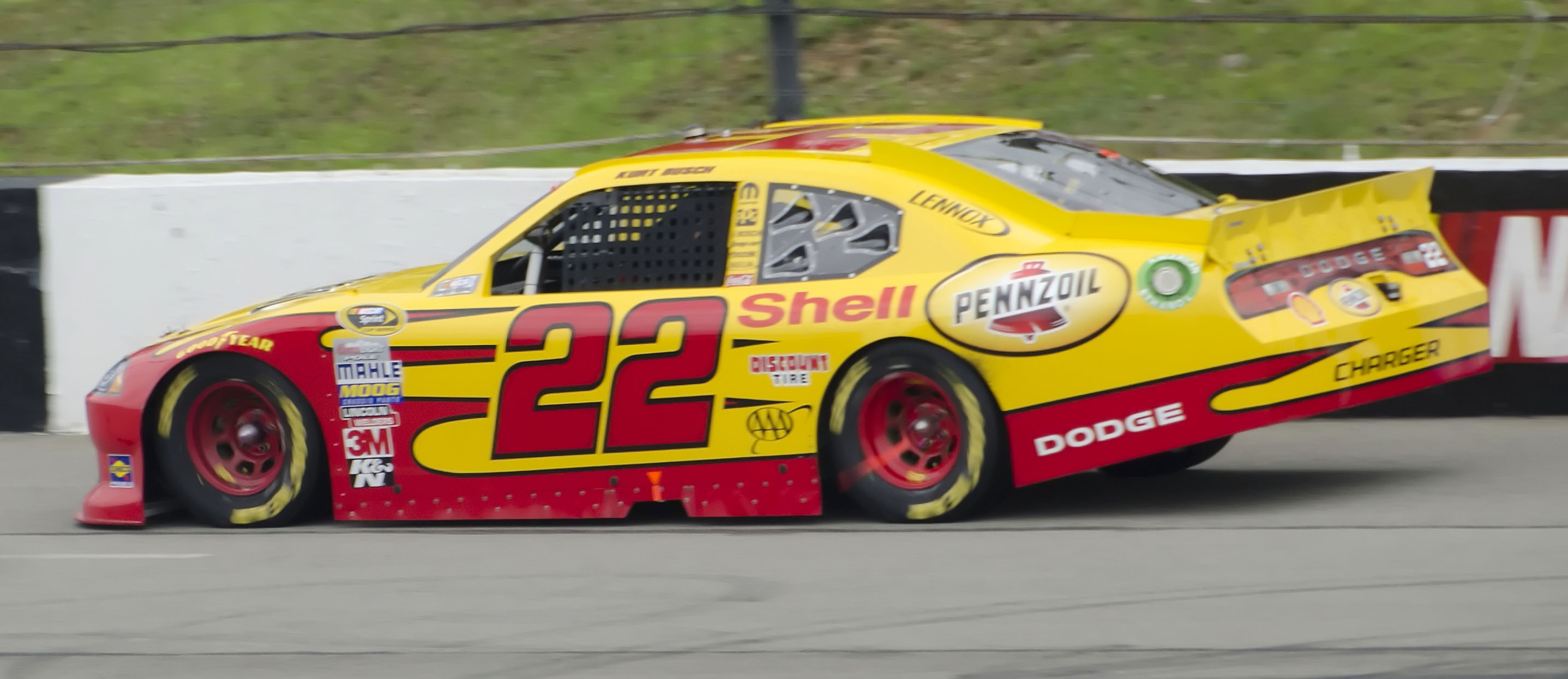
Kurt Busch's No. 22 at Pocono Raceway in 2011

In 2011, Busch and Keselowski swapped teams. Busch took over the renumbered No. 22 Dodge. He won his first Budweiser Shootout after Denny Hamlin went below the yellow line at Daytona, followed by a victory in the Gatorade Duel 1. Due to Dale Earnhardt Jr.'s crash in practice, Busch started first in the 2011 Daytona 500, making it three wins in a row to start the season. During the Crown Royal 400 at Richmond, Busch launched a profanity-laced tirade on his in-car radio, seemingly directed at Penske technical director Tom German.

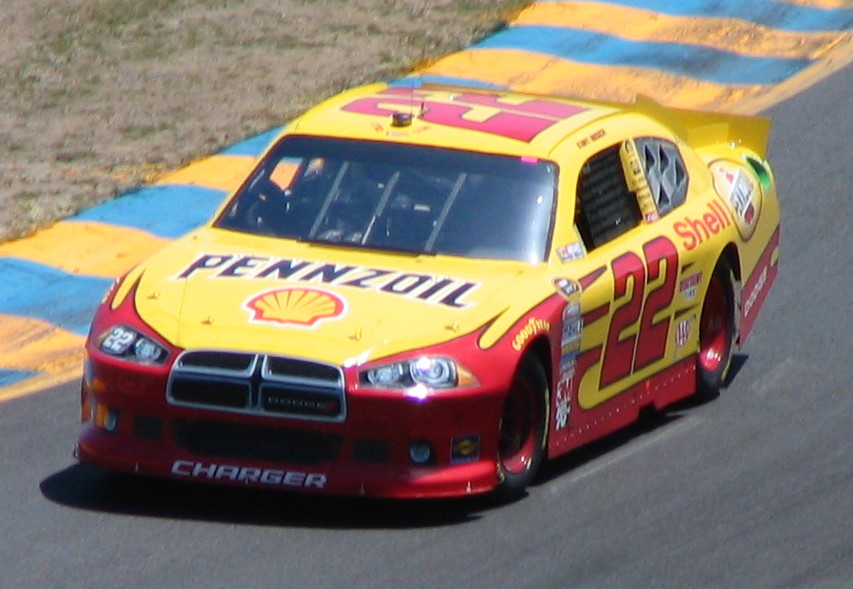
Kurt competing in the 2011 Toyota/Save Mart 350 at Sonoma, a race he would go on to win.

Busch won the pole and dominated the race at Kansas by leading 152 laps, but a late fuel pickup issue cost him a victory, which went to his teammate Brad Keselowski. On June 26, Busch secured his first road course win at Infineon Raceway, leading 76 laps. After Keselowski was injured in a practice crash at Road Atlanta, Busch filled in for him at the Zippo 200 at Watkins Glen International, where he claimed the pole and won the race. By August 13, 2011, Busch had won 25% of his Nationwide Series starts. On October 2, he earned his first victory at Dover's Monster Mile, leading the final 43 laps after two late restarts and beating Jimmie Johnson. This would ultimately be his last win for Penske Racing. The season ended on a sour note as Busch struggled in the final five races. Tensions peaked when he verbally attacked an ESPN cameraman and made an obscene gesture after a transmission failure during the season finale. Crew chief Steve Addington departed for Stewart–Haas Racing following the 2011 season.

==== First media incidents and release ====
During the post-race interview at the fall Richmond race, Busch made headlines with his fiery behavior. On ABC, Busch claimed he was "in [Johnson's] head". The situation escalated after the race when NASCAR.com reporter Joe Menzer asked Busch if either he or Johnson could win the Chase. Busch, visibly agitated, interrupted Menzer, saying, "How did I see you were going to come with that? We're good", before attempting to walk away. However, the exchange took a turn when Busch shouted expletives and physically confronted Menzer, prompting Penske team members to restrain him. Later, during a press conference, AP journalist Jenna Fryer asked Johnson about Busch's comment from the ABC interview. Busch interjected, denying he made the statement, saying, "I didn't say that tonight. Did not." Fryer offered to show him the transcript, which Busch reviewed after the interview. In a dramatic gesture, Busch tore up the transcript and left the media center. Busch later apologized to both Menzer and Fryer for his conduct.

At the start of the Sylvania 300 at New Hampshire Motor Speedway, Busch's team faced a delay in rolling their car to pit road due to a pre-race inspection issue. The rear-end housing was found to be outside of allowable tolerances, causing the setback. As ESPN reporter Jamie Little approached Busch to ask a question, he responded curtly, expressing frustration: "Why the fuck do you think I would be OK? I gotta go get in my car. NASCAR told me I gotta get in my car."

During the final race of the 2011 season, Busch's transmission failed on the third lap. While his car was being repaired, Busch verbally abused an ESPN cameraman while he was waiting to get interviewed by Dr. Jerry Punch where he said "can you get this motherfucker out of my face?" Eventually, Dr. Punch opted to not interview Busch. The incident, captured by a fan and posted on YouTube, drew widespread criticism. NASCAR fined Busch US$50,000 for his conduct, and Penske Racing issued an apology for his "inappropriate actions." Later, during Championship Week, Busch addressed the incident, revealing that he had been working with a sports psychologist for two months to address personal issues. He acknowledged the need to improve his behavior, stating, "I need to be a better person on the radio, to the team, as a leader. It's personal issues, of course, and working with a sports psychologist, I've gotten obviously a small grasp, but there are obviously bigger things that I need to accomplish and things can't happen overnight".

On December 5, 2011, Busch's employment with Penske Racing ended. While both parties described the separation as mutual, many observers believed he was fired. According to The Charlotte Observer, multiple sources confirmed that team owner Roger Penske made the decision after Busch's altercation at Homestead-Miami Speedway, viewing it as the final incident in a tumultuous tenure. The announcement was reportedly delayed until after Champion's Week. A. J. Allmendinger was named as his replacement in the No. 22 car.

==== Phoenix Racing ====
===== 2012: Second winless season =====
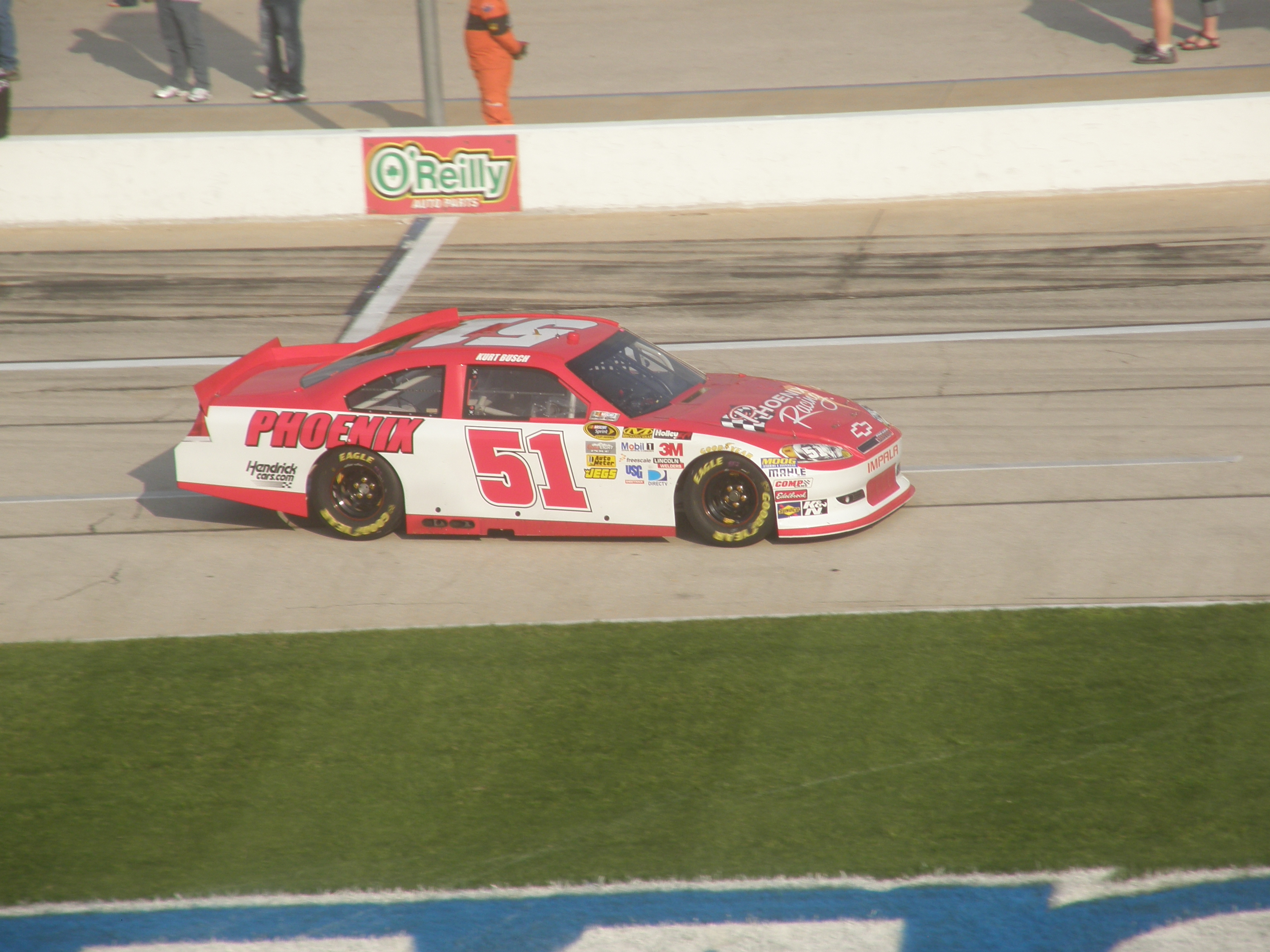
Busch during practice for the 2012 Samsung Mobile 500 at Texas Motor Speedway

After his release from Penske Racing, Busch acknowledged that he was no longer "having fun" with racing and decided to seek therapy for his anger issues while focusing on restoring his enjoyment of the sport. Busch declined an offer from Richard Petty Motorsports and instead opted for an early-season agreement to drive the No. 51 Chevrolet for Phoenix Racing in the 2012 Sprint Cup Series season. He also explored potential opportunities with Michael Waltrip Racing, Furniture Row Racing, and Richard Childress Racing. Additionally, Busch competed in a limited Nationwide Series schedule with Phoenix Racing. During this time, Busch also established a sponsorship deal with Monster Energy. Through this partnership, he signed on with Kyle Busch Motorsports to share the No. 54 car in the Nationwide Series with his younger brother, Kyle Busch.

At the 2012 Aaron's 499 at Talladega, Busch paid tribute to the 2006 racing comedy Talladega Nights: The Ballad of Ricky Bobby by running his No. 51 car in the paint scheme of Ricky Bobby's No. 62 "ME" Cougar car from the film. NASCAR on Fox commentators Mike Joy, Larry McReynolds, and Darrell Waltrip jokingly referred to Busch as "Ricky Bobby" throughout the race, while Busch quoted lines from the movie over team radio. Busch spent months securing permission from Sony, Will Ferrell, and other rights holders to use the design. Notably, parallels were drawn between Busch's real-life struggles during the 2011–12 Sprint Cup offseason and Ricky Bobby's fictional fall from grace. Busch's car performed well, running near the front and leading a few laps. However, with six laps remaining, he spun out in the trioval after contact with former teammate Brad Keselowski. After stopping, Busch drove backward down pit road to get new tires. Despite the unconventional move, he avoided penalties and finished twentieth, the last car on the lead lap.

At Darlington, Busch collided with Ryan Newman, ending both drivers' races. Busch was fined US$50,000 and placed on a five-race probation, while Newman received no penalty. Busch ultimately finished 21st, the last car on the lead lap.

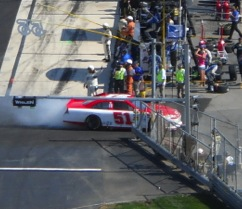
Busch's engine fails at the 2012 FedEx 400.

On June 4, 2012, Busch clashed with Justin Allgaier during the Nationwide event at Dover. Later, in an interview with reporter Bob Pockrass, Busch was asked about his probation. He responded, "It refrains me from not beating the shit out of you right now because you ask me stupid questions. But since I'm on probation, I suppose that's improper to say as well. If you can talk about racing things, we'll talk about many things, Bob. It is not racing, you're here just to start stuff, you know that's you're all out here for!" As a result of this outburst, NASCAR immediately suspended Busch from the Pocono race, citing a violation of its policy against public profanity. NASCAR later extended his suspension until June 13, 2012, and lengthened his probation through December 31. Busch had already been on probation for a prior incident involving Ryan Newman's team at the May 12 Sprint Cup race at Darlington, where he was cited for reckless driving through Newman's pit stall. According to a NASCAR news release, Busch was suspended for violating Section 12-1 of the rulebook, which prohibits "actions detrimental to stock car racing", including "violation of probation" and "verbal abuse of a media member".

On July 6, 2012, Busch won the Nationwide Series Subway Jalapeño 250 at Daytona, overtaking Austin Dillon on the final lap.

During his 7–8 month stint with James Finch, he finished third at Sonoma after leading several laps and running in the top three throughout the race. However, his closest near-miss occurred at Talladega that fall. Busch led early and midway through the race but spun out after contact with Jamie McMurray. He was parked by NASCAR after driving away from safety officials who were trying to assist him, refusing to stop his car despite NASCAR's instructions. The following week, he began driving for Furniture Row Racing.

==== Furniture Row Racing ====
===== 2013 =====
On September 24, 2012, it was announced that Busch would drive the No. 78 Chevrolet SS for Furniture Row Racing in the 2013 season, replacing Regan Smith. The opportunity arose when then-crew chief Todd Berrier reached out to Busch to gauge his interest in joining FRR. Busch made his debut for the team at the 2012 Bank of America 500, finishing 21st. He followed that with a 25th-place finish at Kansas. However, he rebounded with three consecutive top-ten finishes at Texas, Phoenix, and Homestead to close out the season. Despite the strong finish, Busch missed the Chase for the first time since 2008 and ended the year 25th in the points standings.

===== 2013: Return to The Chase =====
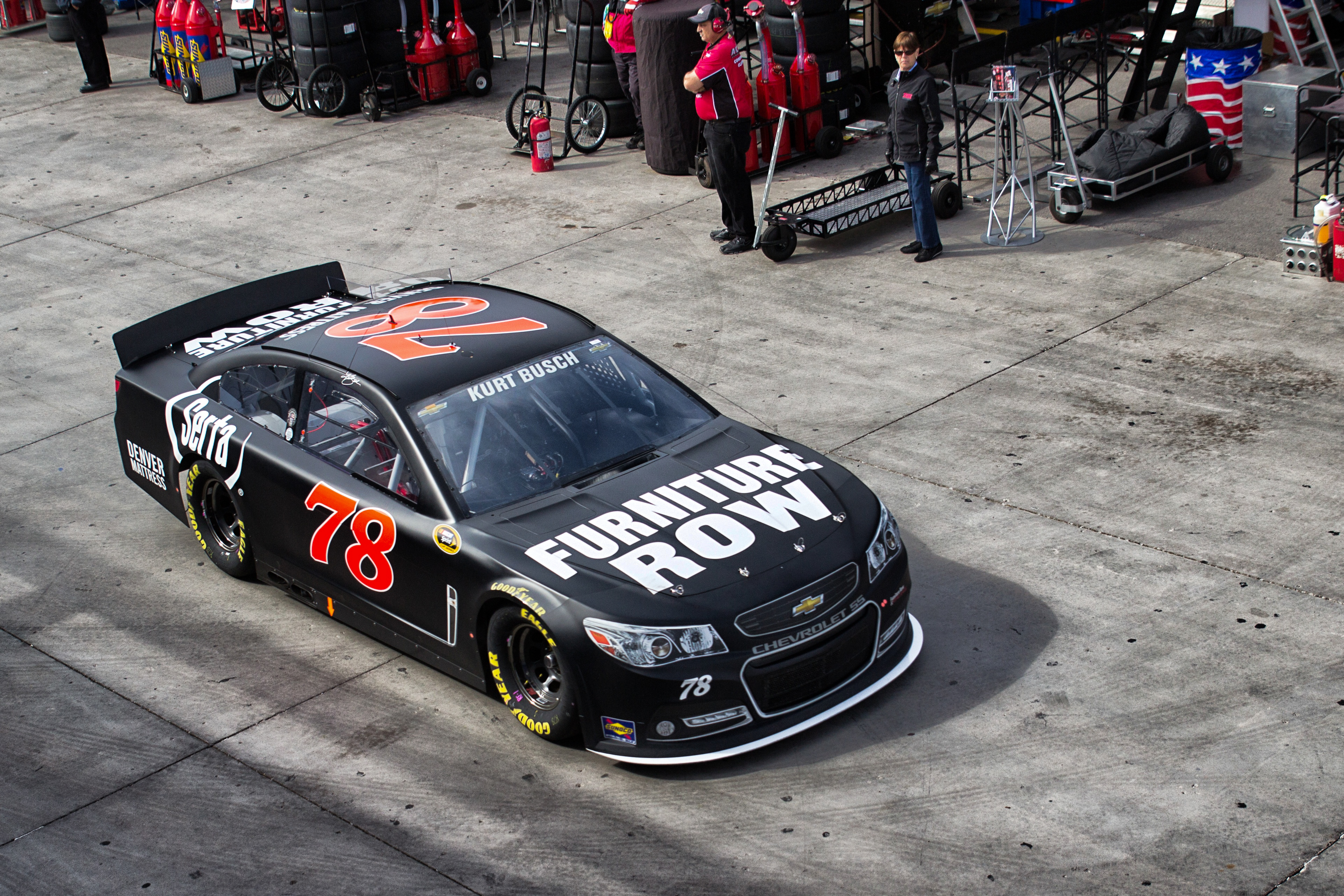
Kurt Busch's No. 78 at Las Vegas Motor Speedway in 2013

The 2013 season for Busch began similarly to 2012, as he joined a new team, Furniture Row Racing (FRR). However, Busch showed notable improvement over his challenging 2012 season, both individually and with FRR. His start to the year was rough, as he crashed during the Sprint Unlimited on lap 14, finishing thirteenth. He placed fifth in the Budweiser Duel but struggled with handling issues, leading to a 28th-place finish in the Daytona 500, five laps down. His performance didn't improve much at Phoenix, where he finished 27th, one lap down. He then placed 20th at Las Vegas. After these less successful finishes, Busch bounced back with a strong performance, securing a 4th-place finish at Bristol.

At Fontana, Busch briefly went a lap down due to a penalty for speeding during green-flag pit stops but rallied in the final laps to finish 3rd, behind his brother Kyle and Dale Earnhardt Jr.. At Martinsville, Busch's luck soured. After an early crash and a successful lucky dog pass, he lost his brakes on lap 487 while running many laps down and hit the wall hard, causing his engine to catch fire. The incident led to a 6-minute red flag, but Busch was uninjured.

At Texas, Busch nearly secured the pole position with a qualifying speed of 195.688 mph (314.929 km/h). However, his younger brother, Kyle, ultimately claimed the pole with a speed of 196.299 mph (315.913 km/h), closing out the qualifying session. Busch started second, still on the front row, but expressed disappointment at losing the pole, saying, "I would rather lose to Kyle than anybody else... it is frustrating that I do lose it to him though."

At Richmond, Busch led for 36 laps and was a contender for the win. However, after a late restart, he collided with Tony Stewart, bumping him out of the top ten. Post-race, the two exchanged shoves and argued on pit road, overshadowing Kevin Harvick's victory. Both were called to the NASCAR hauler. Busch finished ninth and stated he didn't intentionally hit Stewart and was surprised by Stewart's retaliation. At Talladega, Busch led two laps and was in the top ten when he was caught in a massive wreck on lap 182. J. J. Yeley, after contact with Ricky Stenhouse Jr., hit Busch, causing him to flip and land on Ryan Newman before striking the wall and getting hit by Clint Bowyer and Bobby Labonte. Busch was unharmed.

At Darlington, Busch earned his first pole of the season and led 69 of the first eighty laps. However, his handling deteriorated after the green flag pit stops, and he finished fourteenth. In the All-Star race, Busch led 29 laps and won two of the four twenty-lap segments, with his brother Kyle winning the other two. A poor pit stop for both Busch brothers cost them the lead, and Kurt finished fifth in the final ten-lap shootout, won by Jimmie Johnson.

At the Coca-Cola 600 a week later, Busch started second, on the outside of the front row. Despite having to change a battery late in the race, he led eight laps and finished third, marking his first top-three finish since June 2012 at Sonoma. When interviewed, he said, "Yeah, a top-five is great. To be up front, to lead laps, that's what it's all about. So we'll get these little hiccups polished up and continue plugging forward. That's the only thing we can do, is learn from what exactly happened – was it a cable issue, a battery that was dead, was the alternator not charging? To show our strength tonight, to finish third, we'll take it. I think that's what needs to be said. The Furniture Row team was fast, and we didn't quite have a perfect night, and we brought it home third."

Busch earned a twelfth-place finish at Dover and a seventh-place result at Pocono. At Michigan, he qualified on the front row and led the first 21 laps, but fell seven laps down after an early accident on lap thirty. At Sonoma, Busch secured his next top-five finish with a fourth-place result, after leading fifteen laps and recovering from a lap down following two speeding penalties on pit road.

At Kentucky, Busch was involved in a controversy on lap 48 when he caused a seven-car wreck. He went down to the apron, then came back up and turned Keselowski into turn 1, triggering a crash that also involved Greg Biffle, Travis Kvapil, and Dave Blaney. Busch finished 6th and followed that with another sixth-place finish at the Coke Zero 400, marking Furniture Row Racing's first-ever streak of three consecutive top-ten finishes. This moved Busch up to ninth in points. However, at Loudon the next week, Busch started second, led 102 laps, but was turned and wrecked by Matt Kenseth, finishing 31st.

At Indianapolis, Busch finished fourteenth. The following week at Pocono, he led nine laps and secured a third-place finish. He then earned a ninth-place finish at Watkins Glen. Back at Michigan, Busch started on the outside of the front row, led 43 laps, and finished third, moving up to ninth in the driver points standings.

At Bristol in August, Busch started from the outside row and led 54 laps early. However, a loose wheel forced him behind the wall, resulting in a 31st-place finish, 26 laps down. He rebounded in the next two weeks, finishing fourth at Atlanta. The following week at Richmond, Busch started 2nd and had one of the strongest cars of the night, ultimately finishing second to Carl Edwards. This also marked Furniture Row Racing's first-ever appearance in the Chase.

At Chicagoland, Busch began the Chase with a fourth-place finish. He then finished 13th at New Hampshire and 21st at Dover after pitting for a loose wheel. At Kansas, Busch had to start at the rear of the field due to a practice crash that required a backup car. Despite the setback, he worked his way through the pack to finish second. This marked his tenth Top 5 and fifteenth top-ten finishes in thirty races. Busch ultimately finished tenth in the final standings.

In 2013, Busch was scheduled to drive the No. 1 Chevrolet for Phoenix Racing in the Nationwide Series, with plans to compete in sixteen events. However, he participated in only three races that season. He wrecked at Daytona but achieved top-ten finishes at Talladega and in the second race at Daytona.

==== Stewart–Haas Racing ====
On August 26, 2013, Busch announced his departure from Furniture Row Racing to join Stewart–Haas Racing under a multi-year contract. Team co-owner Gene Haas confirmed he would fully sponsor Busch's ride. By late September, it was revealed that Busch's car would carry the No. 41.

===== 2014: Return to Victory Lane =====
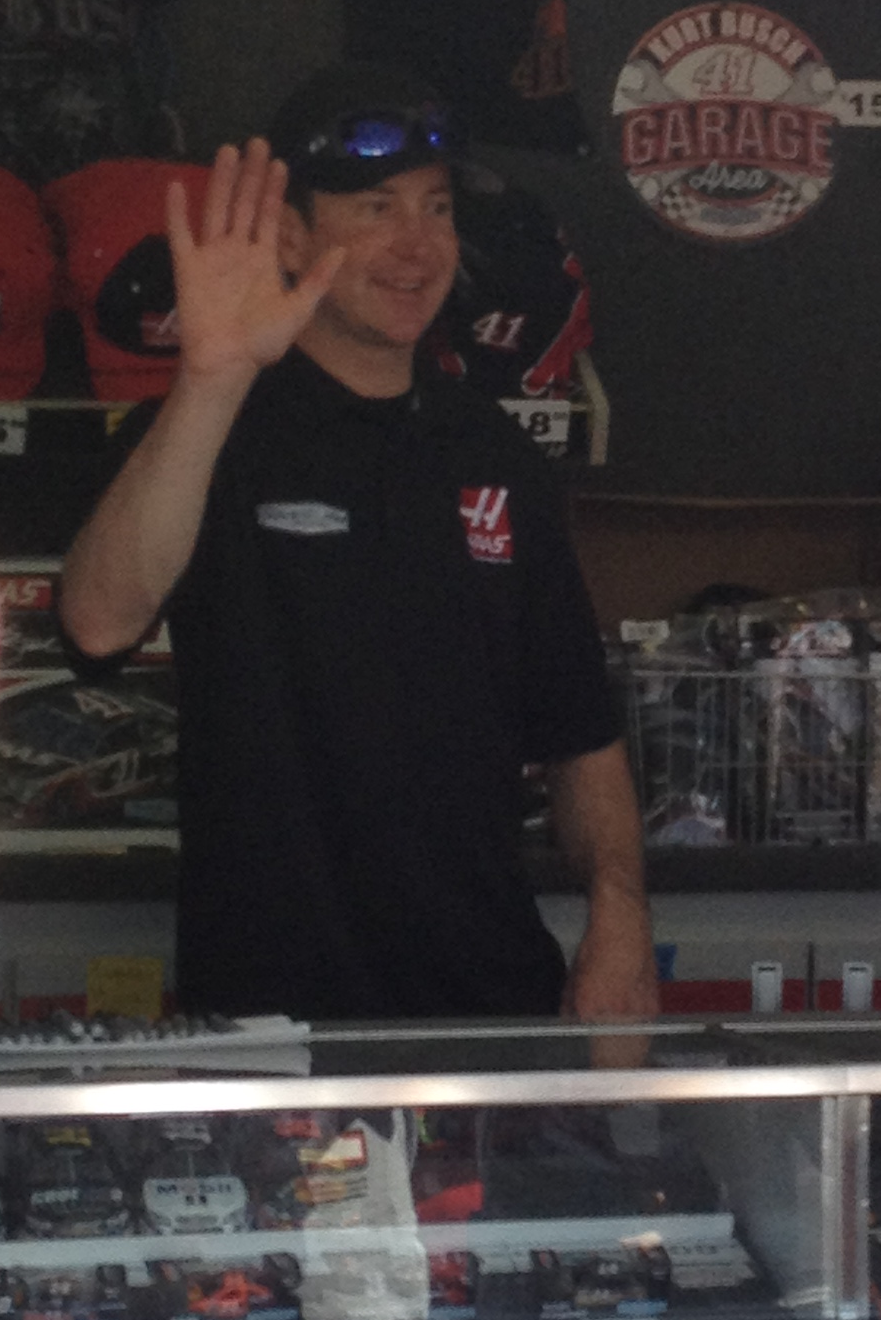
Busch at his souvenir trailer signing autographs at the 2014 Pocono 400

Busch had a breakout performance for his new team at Fontana. He took the lead late in the race after Jimmie Johnson blew a tire with seven laps to go. On the restart, Busch led against his teammate, Tony Stewart, but lost the top spot on the final lap when Kyle Busch slipped past to claim the victory.

The following week at the STP 500, Busch found himself in a controversial moment on lap 43. During a caution, he collided with Keselowski on pit road, causing significant damage to Keselowski's car. After repairs, Keselowski returned to the track, leading to several heated on-track exchanges between the two drivers. In the final stages of the race, Busch engaged in a thrilling battle with Jimmie Johnson for the lead. With eleven laps to go, Busch overtook Johnson and held on to secure his first win since 2011 and his first victory at Martinsville since 2002.

At Darlington, with just three laps to go and running in the top five, Busch was tapped from behind by Clint Bowyer, causing him to spin and crash head-on into a barrier. Thanks to energy-absorbing walls, Busch escaped uninjured. However, under caution, he waved angrily at Bowyer and expressed his frustration during the post-race ceremonies. Reflecting on the incident, Busch stated, "That was a terrible way to end what could have been a decent night. We struggled at times to get the balance of the Haas Automation Chevrolet right, but we kind of found our spot just past the halfway point and made slight adjustments the rest of the way. We called for a two-tire stop at the end, hoping to gain some track position, but it seemed like everyone had the same idea. We gained a little, but the guys behind us all had four tires. I tried to hold them off the best I could, but someone (Bowyer) moved me out of their way, and it ruined our night. I hate it for the team, but we keep learning each week, and we will get better."

At the 2014 Coca-Cola 600, Busch attempted to complete all 1,100 miles of the Indianapolis 500 and Coca-Cola 600 on the same day. However, his effort fell 194 miles short when his engine failed on lap 274, leaving him with 271 of the 400 laps completed.

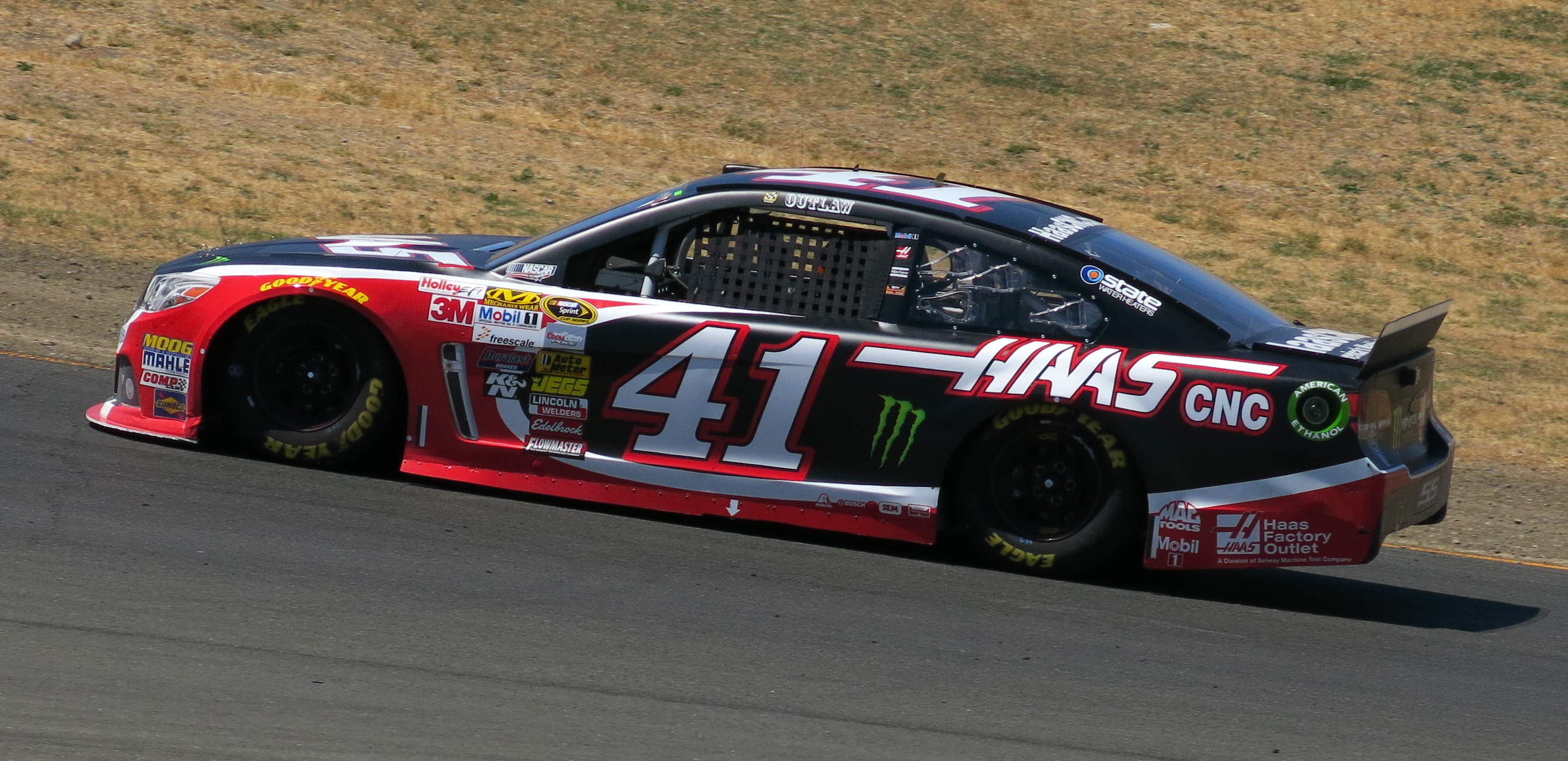
Kurt competing in the 2014 Toyota/Save Mart 350 at Sonoma

At Pocono, Busch qualified third and led five laps during the race. He consistently ran in the Top 5 throughout the day and secured a 3rd-place finish, his best result since winning at Martinsville.

At Daytona, Busch qualified 42nd but managed to lead the most laps during the race. However, on lap 111, Aric Almirola passed him. Just five laps later, rain began soaking the speedway, and the race was called off on lap 116. In a post-race interview, a disappointed Busch stated, "I didn't do my job. Third is good, but I wanted to win." Following the race, Busch was penalized ten points, and crew chief Daniel Knost was fined US$10,000 due to an illegal window component that had been inadvertently installed before the race. Busch chose not to appeal the penalty.

After the Daytona race, Busch's performance improved significantly. He secured top-five finishes at both Pocono and Watkins Glen. Midway through the Chase, Knost stepped down as Busch's crew chief and was replaced by Tony Gibson. With Gibson's guidance, Busch's performance further improved, consistently qualifying in the top ten for the remaining races. His best finishes during the Chase were two seventh-place results, achieved at Talladega and Phoenix.

===== 2015 =====
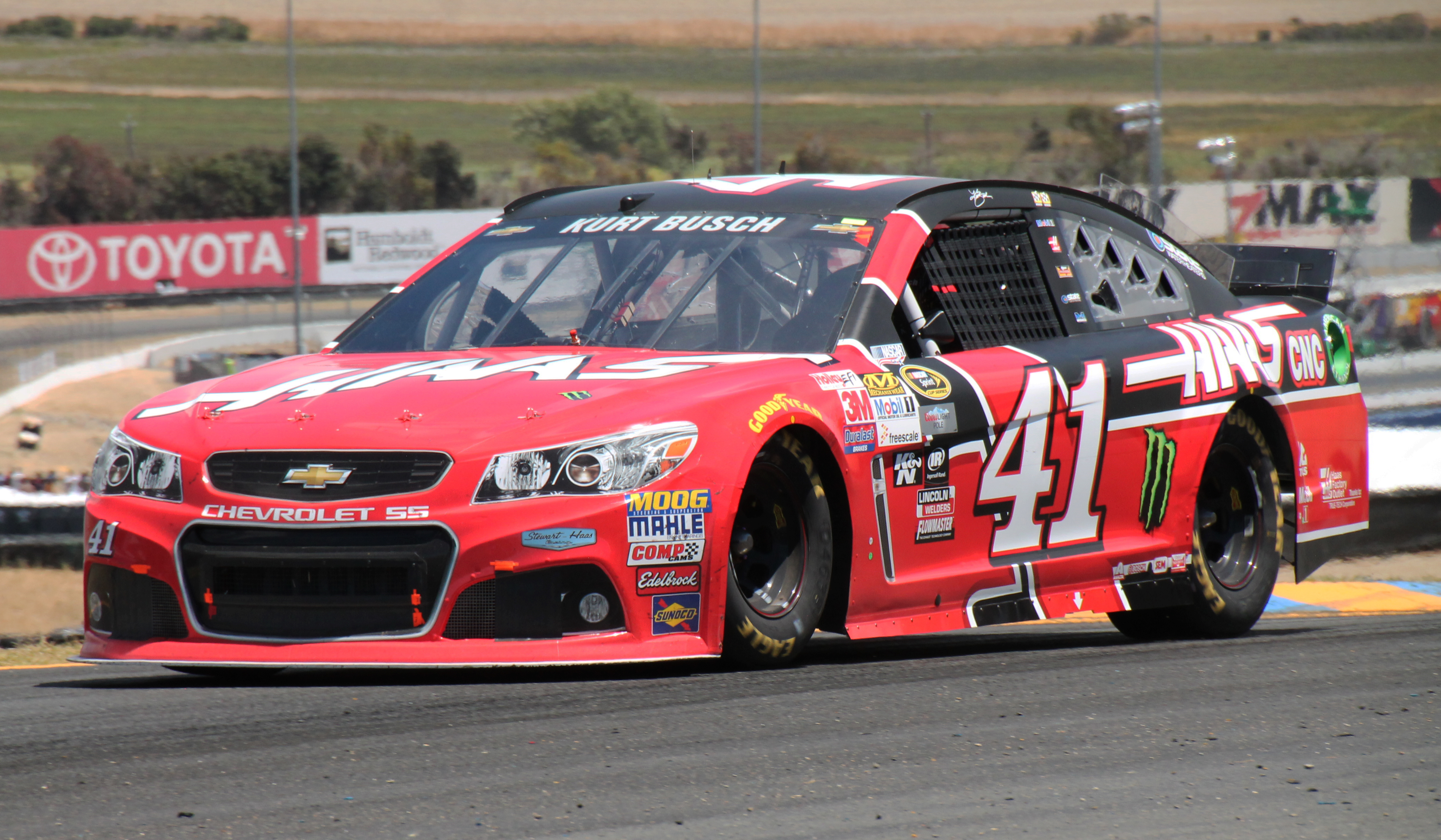
Busch racing at the 2015 Toyota/Save Mart 350, in which he took second place behind his brother, who took first

Busch began his 2015 season on a rough note during the Sprint Unlimited, where he was involved in two multi-car accidents. In the second Budweiser Duel, he was running in 2nd place behind Jimmie Johnson with nine laps remaining. However, Busch accidentally drove below the yellow line, which improved his position. As a result, officials issued a stop-and-go penalty, sending him to the back of the field for the final standings.

On February 20, 2015, NASCAR indefinitely suspended Busch following a Delaware family court's finding that it was "more likely than not" he had abused his ex-girlfriend, Patricia Driscoll. Regan Smith replaced Busch for the Daytona 500 as well as the races in Atlanta and Las Vegas. Busch applied for reinstatement ten days after the Daytona 500 and began participating in NASCAR's reinstatement program.

On March 11, 2015, NASCAR lifted Busch's indefinite suspension after Delaware prosecutors determined there was insufficient evidence for a criminal case (Driscoll was later sentenced to a year in jail for stealing money from her own charity and for tax evasion). He was cleared to race again, starting with the CampingWorld.com 500 at Phoenix. NASCAR also granted Busch a waiver, allowing him to remain eligible for the Chase if he won a race before the Richmond event in the fall. In his first race back, Busch finished fifth. At Auto Club, he won the pole, led 65 laps, but finished third after a last-lap pass by Brad Keselowski and Kevin Harvick.

The following week at Martinsville, Busch led early in the race but dropped to the back of the field midway through. He was briefly penalized for changing lanes before a restart, but twenty laps later, officials rescinded the penalty. Busch then dominated at Richmond, where he battled Jamie McMurray for the win in the final 100 laps. Busch pulled away to claim his first victory of the season.

Busch's second win of the season came in a rain-shortened race at Michigan. At Sonoma, he dominated early but finished second to his younger brother Kyle, marking their first-ever 1-2 finish in NASCAR Sprint Cup history. Despite missing the first three races of the season, Busch finished eighth in the 2015 championship standings, with 21 top-ten finishes and three poles.

===== 2016 =====
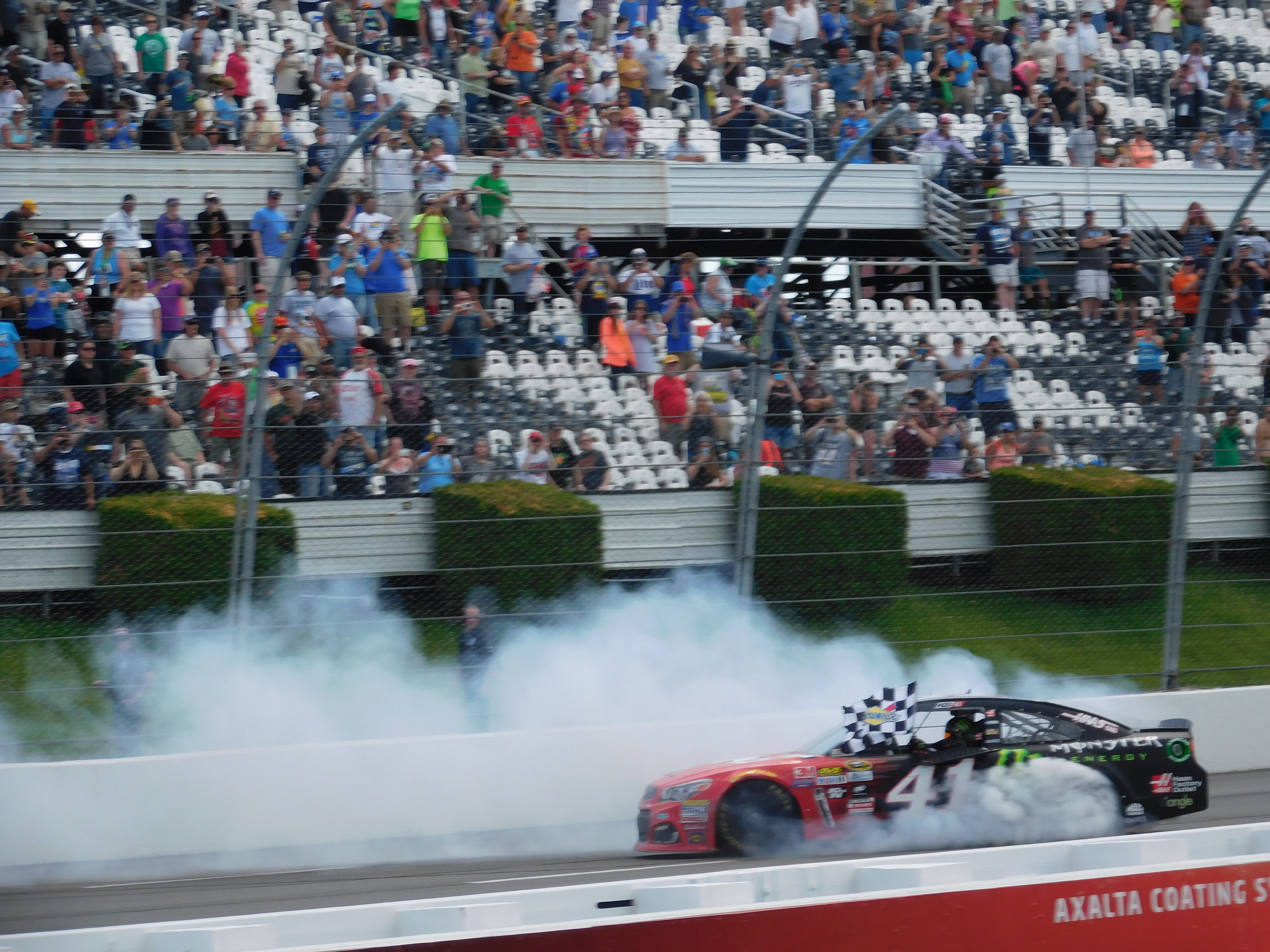
Busch celebrating after winning the 2016 Axalta "We Paint Winners" 400

Busch began the 2016 season with a tenth-place finish in the Daytona 500 and two consecutive pole wins at Atlanta and Las Vegas. However, he received the pole at Atlanta due to his brother Kyle Busch's time being disqualified after failing post-qualifying inspection. His only win of the season came at Pocono, coincidentally, when his crew chief, Gibson, was suspended. Busch had a consistent season, setting a record for the most consecutive lead-lap finishes to start the year. His streak ended with his first DNF at Bristol after contact with Joey Logano. He finished seventh in the championship standings.

===== 2017: Daytona 500 Win =====
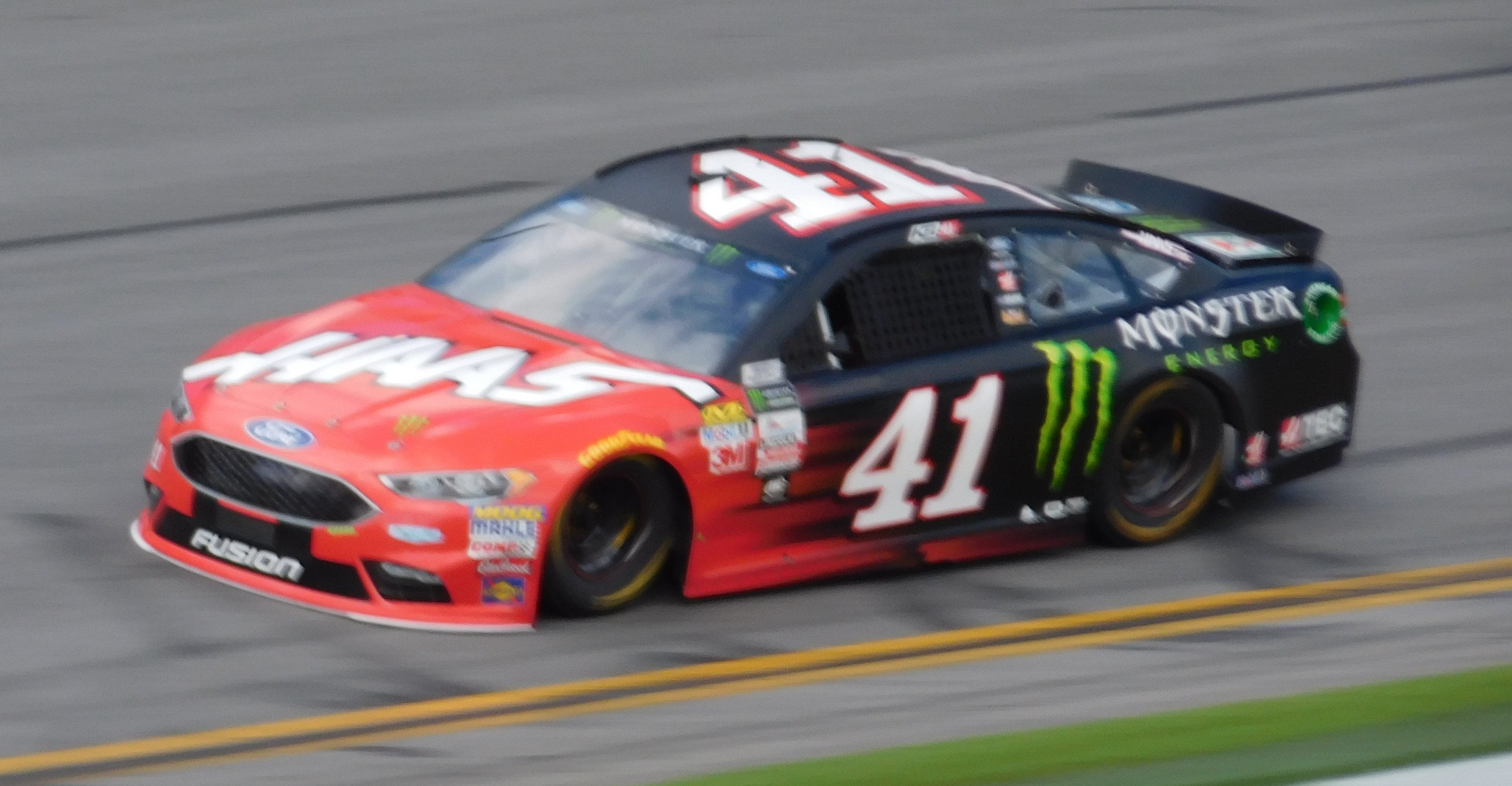
Busch's 2017 Daytona 500 race-winning car

Stewart–Haas Racing switched to Ford for the 2017 season, a manufacturer that had not won a Cup championship since Busch's 2004 title with Roush. Busch's season started with a crash in the Advance Auto Parts Clash after Jimmie Johnson spun. A week later, Busch won the Daytona 500, passing Kyle Larson on the final lap. However, Busch struggled for the rest of the year, finishing fourteenth in the standings with six top-fives, fourteen top-tens, and seven DNFs.

===== 2018: Final season at Stewart–Haas =====
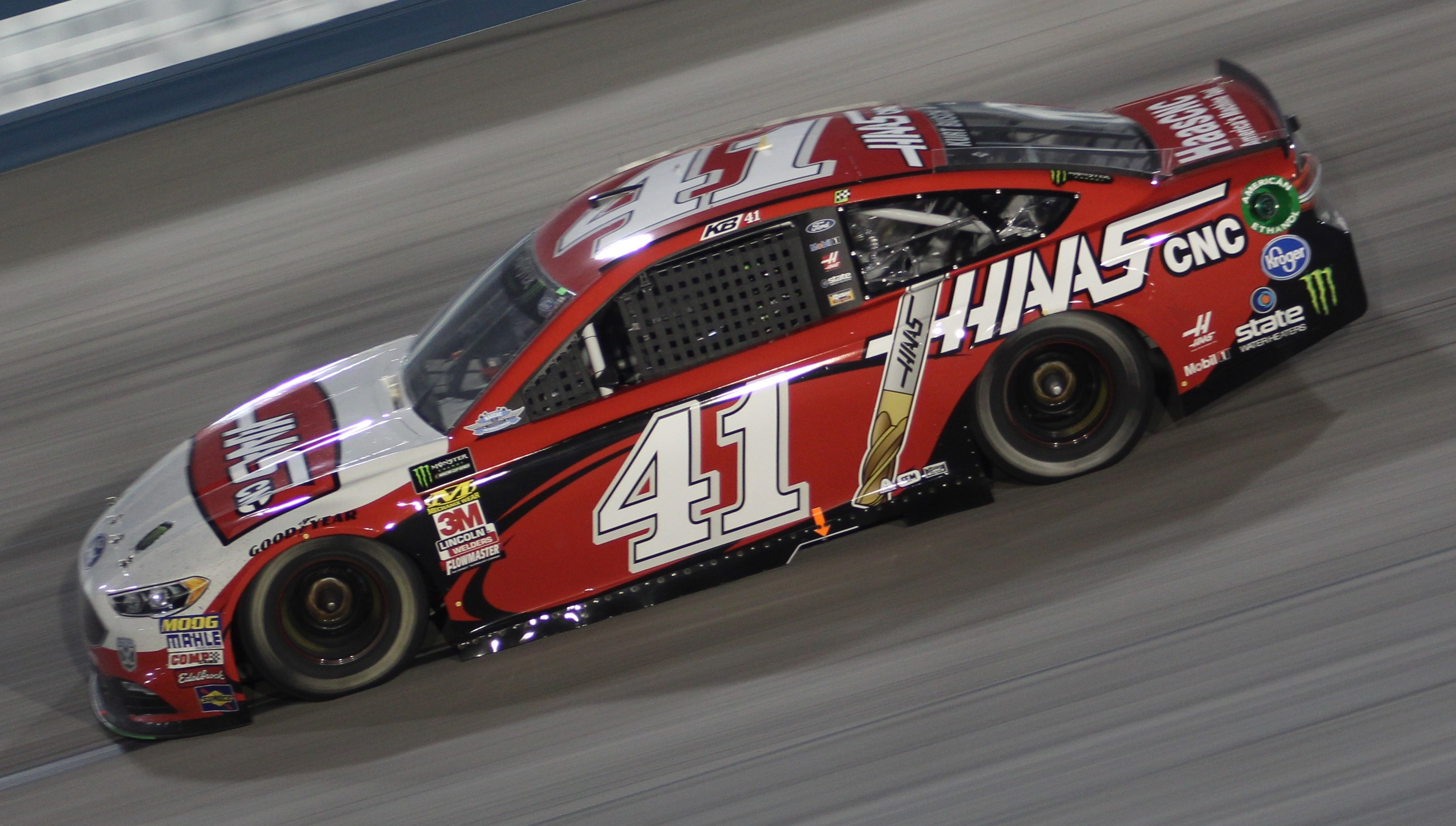
Kurt competing in the 2018 Southern 500 throwback race at Darlington, a race he would finish in 6th

In the summer of 2017, Busch and Stewart–Haas Racing (SHR) struggled to finalize a contract renewal, with SHR not picking up his option. Despite this, Busch and SHR agreed to a one-year deal for 2018. He started the season strong with pole positions at Texas, Michigan, and New Hampshire. Busch won his first race in 58 races at Bristol night race, securing a spot in the 2018 Playoffs. He advanced to the Round of 8 before being eliminated at Phoenix after a late crash with Denny Hamlin and Chase Elliott. Busch finished the season seventh in points. On December 2, 2018, he announced he would not return to SHR in 2019.

==== Chip Ganassi Racing ====
===== 2019 =====
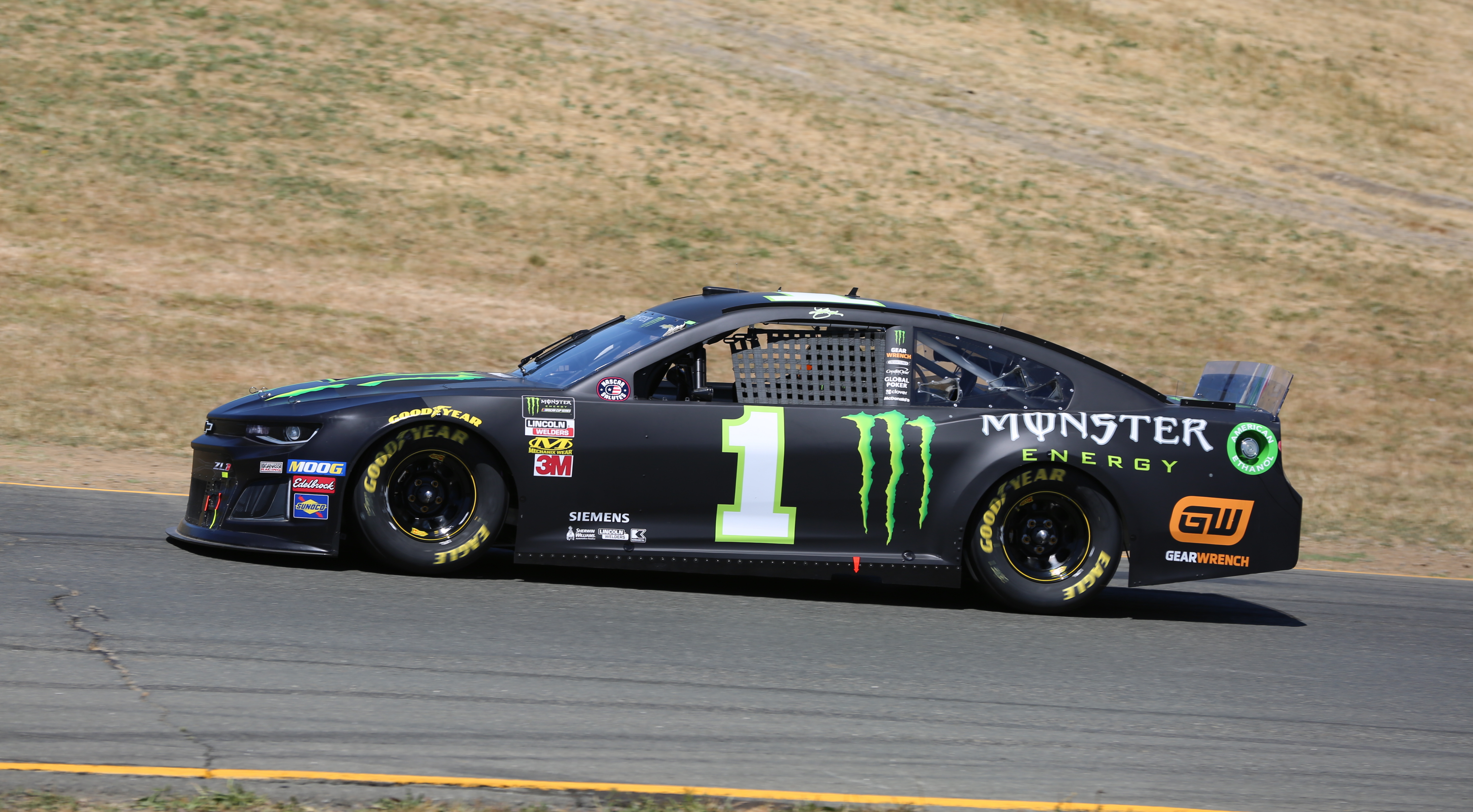
Busch's No. 1 at Sonoma Raceway in 2019

On December 4, 2018, it was confirmed that Busch and his sponsor, Monster Energy, would join Chip Ganassi Racing, driving the No. 1 Chevrolet Camaro ZL1 for the 2019 season. Busch signed a one-year deal, leading many to believe that this would be his final full-time season in NASCAR.

At the Pennzoil 400, Busch's No. 1 car was sponsored by Star Nursery, with a livery inspired by his first NASCAR win in the AutoZone Elite Division. He finished second to his brother Kyle at the 2019 Food City 500, marking their second 1–2 finish. Busch secured his first win with Chip Ganassi Racing (CGR) at Kentucky, defeating Kyle on the final restart. This was the third 1–2 finish for the Busch brothers, but the first time Kurt won. Despite making the playoffs, Kurt was eliminated in the Round of 16 after a twentieth-place finish at the Charlotte Roval. On November 2, 2019, CGR confirmed Kurt would stay with the No. 1 team for at least two more years.

===== 2020 =====
Busch made the 2020 playoffs without a victory, relying on consistency with four top-five finishes and fourteen top-ten finishes. He secured his first win of the season, and 32nd career victory, at Las Vegas, which earned him a spot in the Round of 8.

===== 2021 =====
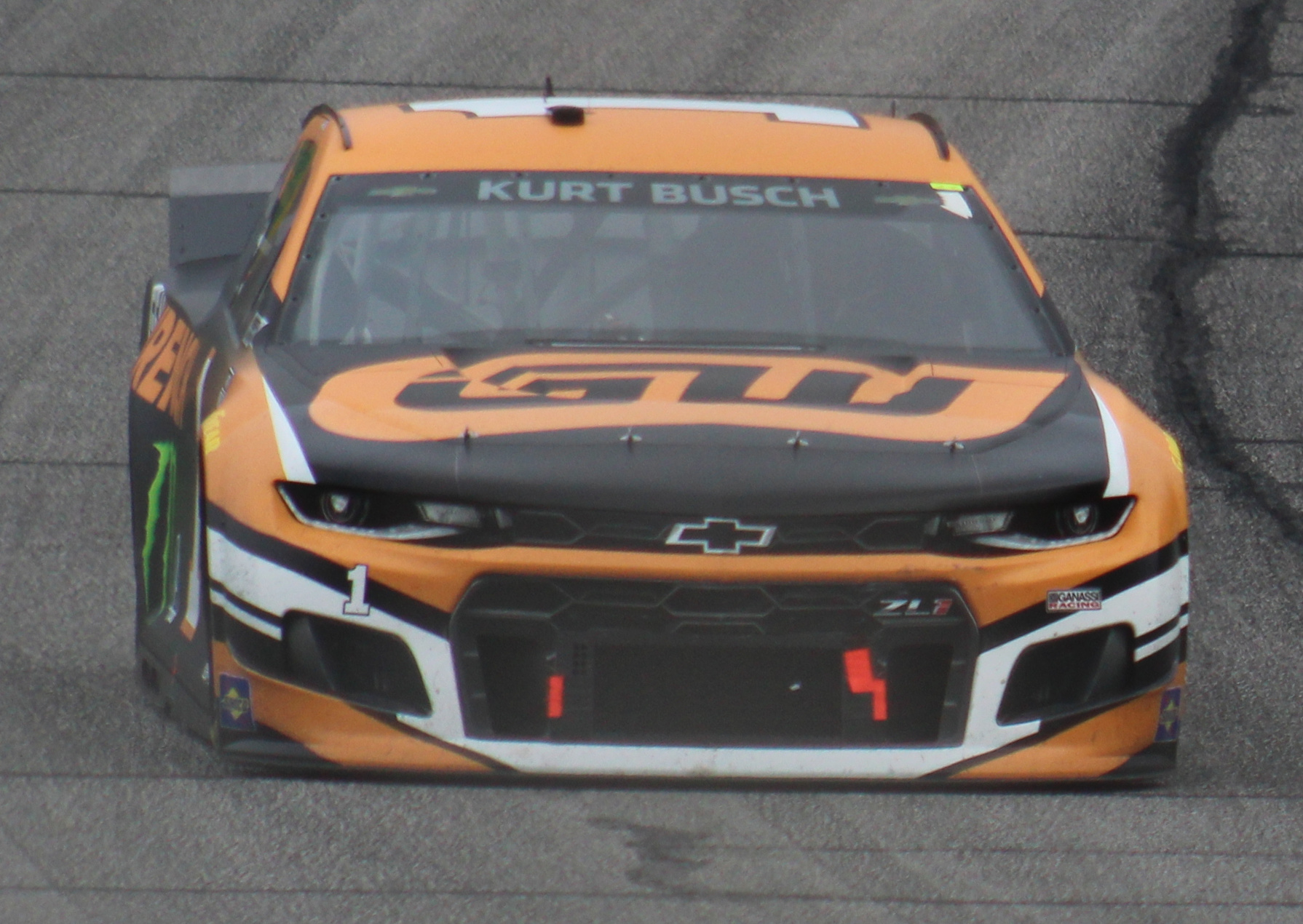
Busch's race-winning car during the 2021 Quaker State 400

Busch started 2021 with one top-five and two top-ten finishes in the first three races, but his results declined until a sixth-place finish at Sonoma in race 16, sparking a streak of three consecutive top-eight finishes. On June 30, Justin Marks, co-founder of Trackhouse Racing, announced he had acquired Chip Ganassi Racing's NASCAR operations, making Busch a free agent after the season. On July 11, Kurt won the Quaker State 400 at Atlanta, holding off his brother Kyle, securing a playoff spot and their final 1-2 finish together. Busch was eliminated in the Round of 16 at Bristol and finished the season eleventh in points.

==== 23XI Racing ====
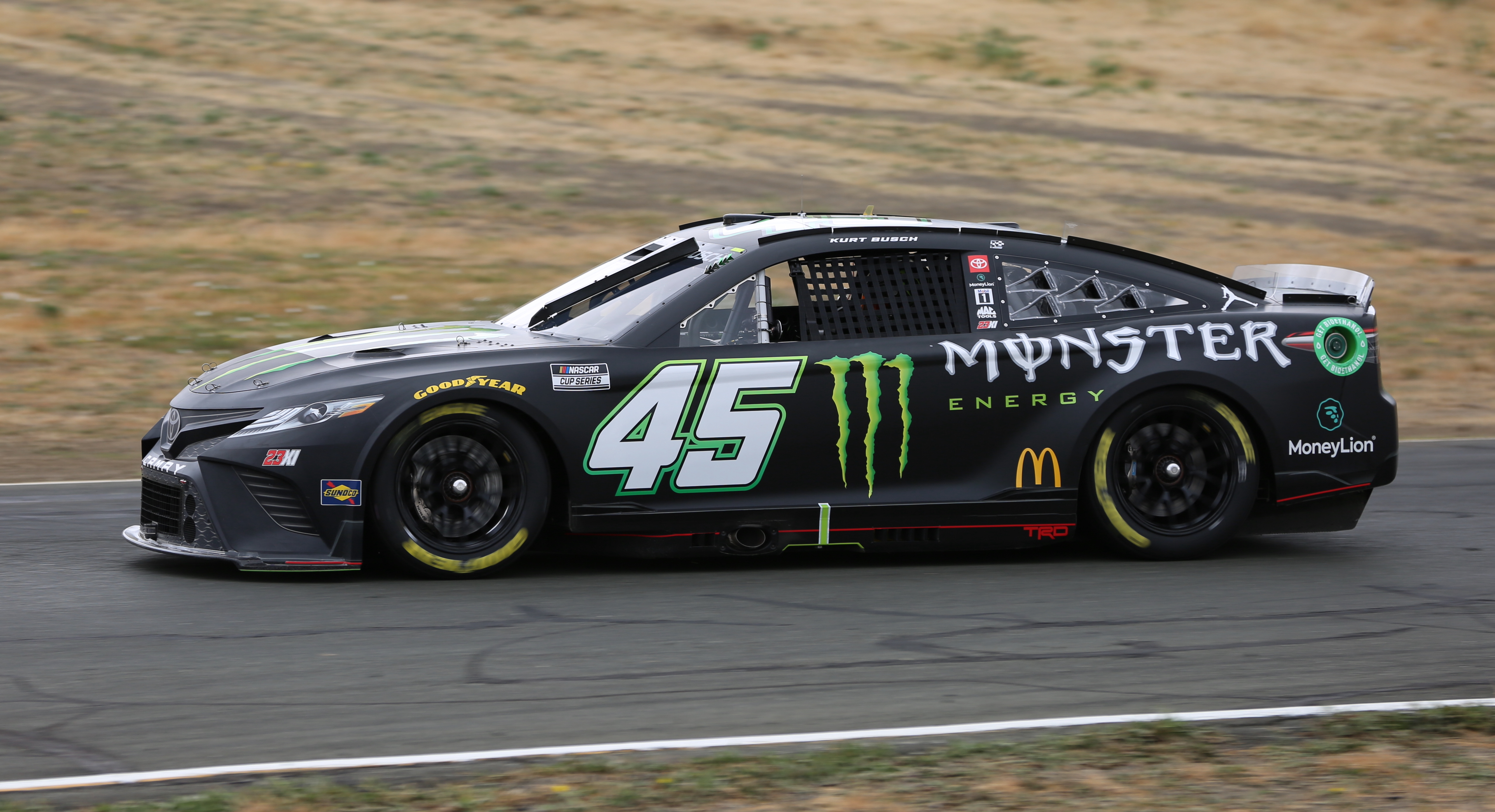
Busch's No. 45 at Sonoma Raceway in 2022

===== 2022: Last full-time season =====
On August 27, 2021, it was announced that Busch would drive the No. 45 Toyota Camry for 23XI Racing in 2022. He kicked off the season with a nineteenth-place finish in the Daytona 500. After promising top-five results at Phoenix and Atlanta, Busch faced a series of setbacks, including poor finishes at COTA, Richmond, Bristol Dirt, Dover, and Darlington. However, he bounced back with a victory at Kansas; this would turn out to be Busch's final Cup win.

====== Accident at Pocono ======
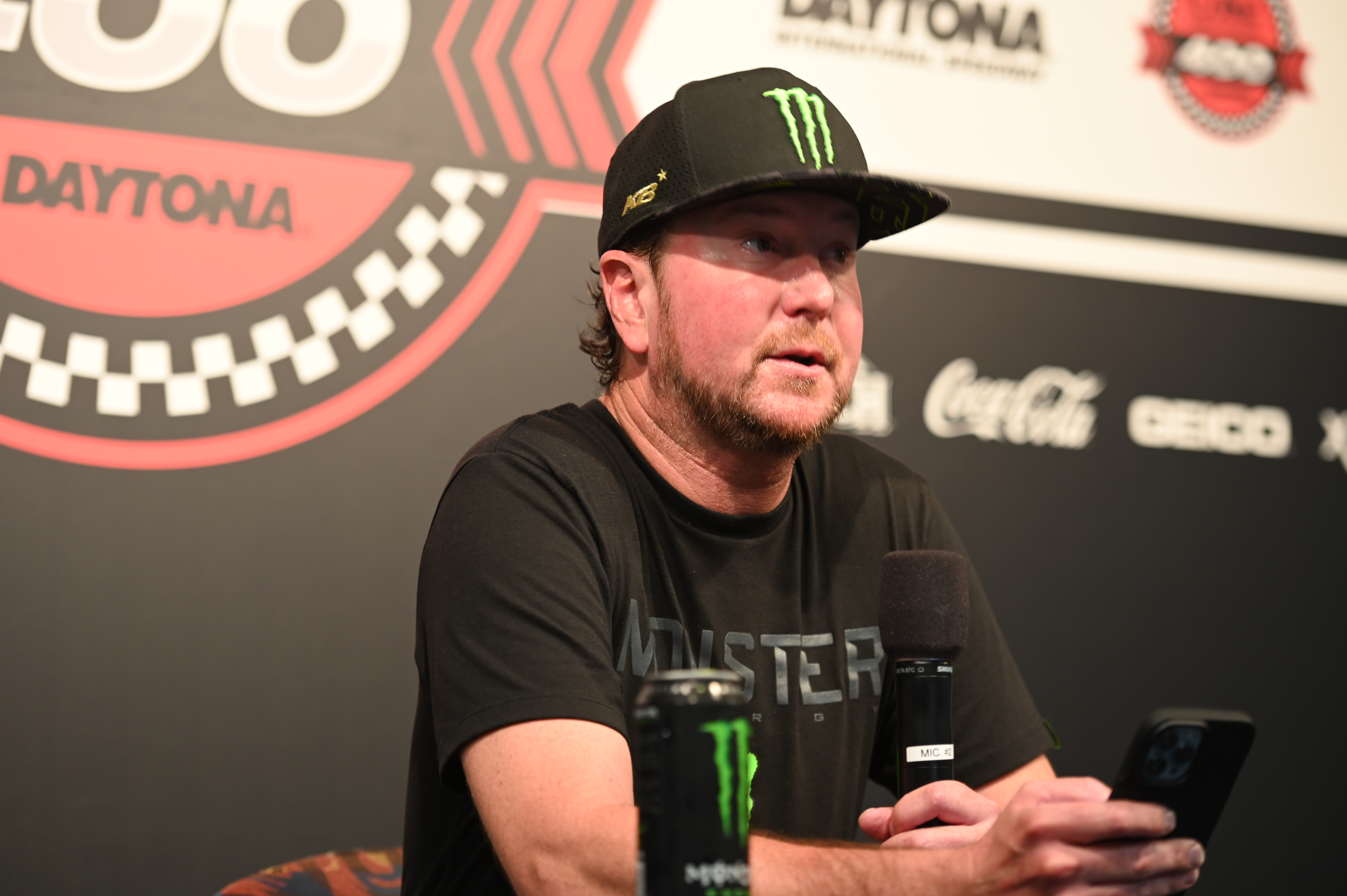
Kurt announcing his retirement from full-time competition in August 2023

At the Pocono race, Busch was not cleared medically after a qualifying crash and missed the last five races of the regular season. Ty Gibbs substituted for him during recovery from concussion symptoms. On August 25, 2022, Busch withdrew his playoff waiver request, missing the playoffs for the first time since 2012. On October 16, 2022, he announced he would retire from full-time racing in 2023, with the option for part-time participation. However, on August 26, 2023, Busch confirmed his retirement from full-time NASCAR Cup Series competition.

=== NHRA ===
Busch began training in January 2011 under veteran NHRA Pro Stock driver Allen Johnson and earned his NHRA Pro Stock competition license. He made his drag racing debut on March 10, 2011, at the 42nd annual Tire Kingdom Gatornationals in Gainesville. Busch qualified for the Pro Stock field on March 12 and competed in his first elimination round on March 13, 2011, where he narrowly lost to Erica Enders by 0.004 seconds. He became only the fourth driver to transition from NASCAR to NHRA, joining Tony Stewart, Richard Petty, and John Andretti.

=== Open-wheel racing ===
In 2003, during CART's pre-season test at Sebring International Raceway, Busch tested a Champ Car for three-time CART champion Bobby Rahal. At the time, Busch's manufacturer in Winston Cup, Ford, was CART's exclusive engine supplier. The test was more for fun than evaluation. Busch drove a car originally fielded for Michel Jourdain Jr. (who later competed in NASCAR) and enjoyed the experience, though he was several seconds off the pace set by Oriol Servià.

In 2013, it was announced that Busch would test an IndyCar for Andretti Autosport, the team owned by 1991 CART champion Michael Andretti, at the Indianapolis Motor Speedway. Andretti's team, the defending champions, used Chevrolet engines, the same as Busch's Furniture Row Racing team in the Sprint Cup Series. Busch did not comment on whether he was preparing to race in the Indianapolis 500.

However, in January 2014, he expressed a strong interest in competing in the iconic race. On March 4, 2014, it was announced that Kurt Busch would attempt to qualify for the 2014 Indianapolis 500, driving a fifth car for Andretti Autosport. He also planned to race in both the Indianapolis 500 and the Coca-Cola 600 on the same day, performing the rare feat of double duty. Busch started twelfth in the Indy 500. After a cautious start, he became more competitive as the race progressed and finished sixth, earning praise from fellow NASCAR drivers. However, his attempt to complete the full 1,100 miles across both races ended 191 miles short when his engine blew on lap 273 at Charlotte.

=== Other racing ===
On October 21, 2014, Busch announced that he would compete in the 2014 Race of Champions for Team USA, alongside IndyCar's Ryan Hunter-Reay. He also participated in the 2017 Race of Champions, joining his brother Kyle Busch for Team USA NASCAR. In the Nations' Cup final, they were defeated by Team Germany's Sebastian Vettel.

On January 14, 2025, Busch announced he had been medically cleared to return to racing and would compete in the 2025 Race of Champions, his first race since his 2022 concussion.

== Personal life ==
Busch was born to Thomas and Gaye Busch in Las Vegas, Nevada. After graduating from Durango High School, he enrolled at the University of Arizona with the intention of earning a degree in pharmacy.

Busch got engaged to Eva Bryan at the 2005 Hungarian Grand Prix and married her on July 27, 2006. They separated in June 2011. In October 2014, he met Ashley Van Metre, and they got engaged on August 26, 2015, marrying on January 7, 2017. They appeared on CMT's Racing Wives in 2019. Ashley filed for divorce on May 17, 2022.

Busch is a baseball fan. Having parents from Chicago, his favorite teams are the Chicago Cubs and the Chicago Bears. He is also a fan of the Vegas Golden Knights.

Before the 2006 season, Busch underwent cosmetic surgery to have his ears pinned back closer to his head.

On May 21, 2026, Busch's younger brother, Kyle Busch, died of pneumonia and sepsis. The Busch family was honored prior to the Coca-Cola 600, the first race since Kyle's death, and Kurt laid down eight flowers in the infield to reflect his brother's final number. Kurt later released a statement saying he "will forever be grateful for the memories we made, the lessons you taught me, and the brotherhood we shared."

=== Legal issues ===
In November 2005, Busch was cited for reckless driving after being pulled over near Phoenix Raceway on suspicion of DUI. He was sentenced to 50 hours of community service, which he was required to complete within a year. In November 2006, Maricopa County Sheriff Joe Arpaio named Busch an honorary deputy.

In August 14, 2024, Busch was arrested in Iredell County, North Carolina, on charges of driving while intoxicated, speeding, and reckless driving. The charges carried a mandatory 30 day license revocation, which a magistrate imposed after his arrest. In November 1, 2024, he pleaded guilty to driving while impaired. As part of a plea agreement, the reckless driving and speeding charges were dropped. Busch received a 60-day jail sentence, which was suspended for 12 months, 12 months of unsupervised probation, and forfeiture of his driver's license. He was also ordered to complete 24 hours of community service and pay a community service fee.

== Motorsports career results ==
=== Racing career summary ===
Season	Series	Team	Races	Wins	Top 5	Top 10	Points	Position
1997	NASCAR Featherlite Southwest Tour	N/A	5	0	1	3	660	28th
1998	NASCAR Featherlite Southwest Tour	N/A	16	1	3	7	1987	6th
1999	NASCAR Featherlite Southwest Tour	N/A	18	6	11	12	2683	**1st**
1999	NASCAR Winston West Series	Charlene Spilsbury	3	0	0	1	326	41st
2000	NASCAR Craftsman Truck Series	Roush Racing	24	4	13	16	3596	**2nd**
2000	NASCAR Winston Cup Series	Roush Racing	7	0	0	0	613	48th
2001	NASCAR Craftsman Truck Series	Roush Racing	1	0	1	1	155	79th
2001	NASCAR Winston Cup Series	Roush Racing	35	0	3	6	3081	27th
2002	NASCAR Featherlite Southwest Tour	N/A	1	0	0	0	130	90th
2002	NASCAR Winston Cup Series	Roush Racing	36	4	12	20	4641	**3rd**
2003	IROC XXVII	N/A	4	1	4	4	69	**1st**
2003	NASCAR Winston Cup Series	Roush Racing	36	4	9	15	4150	11th
2004	IROC XXVIII	N/A	4	0	3	3	46	5th
2004	NASCAR Nextel Cup Series	Roush Racing	36	3	10	21	6506	**1st**
2005	IROC XXIX	N/A	4	0	1	2	43	6th
2005	NASCAR Nextel Cup Series	Roush Racing	34	3	9	18	5974	10th
2005	Rolex Sports Car Series - DP	Multimatic Motorsports	1	0	0	0	16	78th
2005	24 Hours of Daytona	Multimatic Motorsports	1	0	0	0	N/A	15th
2006	NASCAR Busch Series	Penske Racing South	7	2	5	6	1160	39th
2006	NASCAR Nextel Cup Series	Penske Racing South	36	1	7	12	3900	16th
2007	NASCAR Busch Series	Penske Racing South	4	0	2	3	527	69th
2007	NASCAR Nextel Cup Series	Penske Racing South	36	2	6	14	6231	7th
2008	NASCAR Sprint Cup Series	Penske Racing South	36	1	5	10	3635	18th
2008	Rolex Sports Car Series - DP	Penske-Taylor Racing	1	0	1	1	30	46th
2008	24 Hours of Daytona	Penske-Taylor Racing	1	0	1	1	N/A	**3rd**
2009	NASCAR Sprint Cup Series	Penske Championship Racing	36	2	10	21	6446	4th
2010	NASCAR Sprint Cup Series	Penske Championship Racing	36	2	9	17	6142	11th
2011	NASCAR Nationwide Series	Penske Racing	1	1	1	1	0	NC†
2011	NASCAR Sprint Cup Series	Penske Racing	36	2	8	16	2262	11th
2012	NASCAR Camping World Truck Series	Billy Ballew Motorsports	1	0	0	1	0	NC†
2012	NASCAR Camping World Truck Series	Kyle Busch Motorsports	2	0	0	2	0	NC†
2012	NASCAR Nationwide Series	Kyle Busch Motorsports	11	1	6	8	0	NC†
2012	NASCAR Nationwide Series	Phoenix Racing	4	1	1	3	0	NC†
2012	NASCAR Sprint Cup Series	Phoenix Racing	29	0	1	2	735	25th
2012	NASCAR Sprint Cup Series	Furniture Row Racing	6	0	0	3	735	25th
2013	NASCAR Nationwide Series	Phoenix Racing	3	0	2	2	0	NC†
2013	NASCAR Sprint Cup Series	Furniture Row Racing	36	0	10	15	2309	10th
2014	NASCAR Sprint Cup Series	Stewart-Haas Racing	36	1	6	11	2263	12th
2014	IndyCar Series	Andretti Autosports	1	0	0	1	80	25th
2015	NASCAR Sprint Cup Series	Stewart-Haas Racing	33	2	10	21	2333	8th
2016	NASCAR Sprint Cup Series	Stewart-Haas Racing	36	1	9	21	2296	7th
2017	Monster Energy NASCAR Cup Series	Stewart-Haas Racing	36	1	6	15	2217	14th
2018	Monster Energy NASCAR Cup Series	Stewart-Haas Racing	36	1	6	22	2350	7th
2019	Monster Energy NASCAR Cup Series	Chip Ganassi Racing	36	1	5	17	2237	13th
2020	NASCAR Cup Series	Chip Ganassi Racing	36	1	7	19	2287	10th
2021	NASCAR Cup Series	Chip Ganassi Racing	36	1	6	14	2297	11th
2022	NASCAR Cup Series	23XI Racing	20	1	5	8	485	30th

^{†} As Busch was a guest driver, he was ineligible for championship points.

=== NASCAR ===
(key) (Bold – Pole position awarded by qualifying time. – Pole position earned by points standings or practice time. * – Most laps led.)

==== Cup Series ====
NASCAR Cup Series results
Year	Team	No.	Make	1	2	3	4	5	6	7	8	9	10	11	12	13	14	15	16	17	18	19	20	21	22	23	24	25	26	27	28	29	30	31	32	33	34	35	36	NCSC	Pts	Ref
2000	Roush Racing	97	Ford	DAY	CAR	LVS	ATL	DAR	BRI	TEX	MAR	TAL	CAL	RCH	CLT	DOV	MCH	POC	SON	DAY	NHA	POC	IND	GLN	MCH	BRI	DAR	RCH	NHA	DOV; 18	MAR; 37	CLT; 13	TAL	CAR; 24	PHO; 29	HOM; 19	ATL; 36			48th	613	
2001	Roush Racing	97	Ford	DAY; 41	CAR; 36	LVS; 11	ATL; 10	DAR; 30	BRI; 42	TEX; 4	MAR; 33	TAL; 3	CAL; 13	RCH; 18	CLT; 12	DOV; 39	MCH; 43	POC; 13	SON; 23	DAY; 30	CHI; 8	NHA; 42	POC; 37	IND; 5	GLN; 29	MCH; 43	BRI; 25	**DAR**; 39	RCH; 24	DOV; 41	KAN; 9	CLT; 22	MAR; 35	TAL; 29	PHO; 22	CAR; 39	HOM; 23	ATL; DNQ	NHA; 21	27th	3081	
2002	Roush Racing	97	Ford	DAY; 4	CAR; 12	LVS; 20	ATL; 11	DAR; 28	BRI; 1	TEX; 23	MAR; 10	TAL; 3	CAL; 2*	RCH; 27	CLT; 31	DOV; 12	POC; 40	MCH; 10	SON; 4	DAY; 31	CHI; 6	NHA; 8	POC; 2	IND; 41	GLN; 41	MCH; 39	BRI; 6	DAR; 7	RCH; 19	NHA; 2	DOV; 7	KAN; 31	TAL; 4	CLT; 12	MAR; 1	ATL; 1*	CAR; 3	PHO; 6*	**HOM**; 1	3rd	4641	
2003	Roush Racing	97	Ford	DAY; 2	CAR; 2	LVS; 38	ATL; 40	DAR; 2	BRI; 1	TEX; 9	TAL; 19	MAR; 28	CAL; 1	RCH; 8	CLT; 15	DOV; 15	POC; 36	MCH; 1	SON; 28	DAY; 36	CHI; 39	NHA; 11	POC; 2	IND; 7	GLN; 12	MCH; 18	BRI; 1	DAR; 13	RCH; 24	NHA; 15	DOV; 38	TAL; 6	KAN; 40	CLT; 41	MAR; 39	ATL; 8	PHO; 4*	CAR; 17	HOM; 36	11th	4150	
2004	Roush Racing	97	Ford	DAY; 16	CAR; 8	LVS; 9	ATL; 12	DAR; 6*	BRI; 1*	TEX; 6	MAR; 11	TAL; 36	CAL; 23	RCH; 31	CLT; 11	DOV; 12	POC; 5	MCH; 11	SON; 36	DAY; 4	CHI; 35	NHA; 1	POC; 26	IND; 10	GLN; 10	MCH; 6	BRI; 8	CAL; 11	RCH; 15	NHA; 1*	DOV; 5	TAL; 5	KAN; 6	CLT; 4	MAR; 5*	ATL; 42	PHO; 10	**DAR**; 6	**HOM**; 5	1st	6506	
2005	Roush Racing	97	Ford	DAY; 2	CAL; 3	LVS; 3	ATL; 32	BRI; 35	MAR; 19	TEX; 7	PHO; 1*	TAL; 7	DAR; 37	RCH; 17	CLT; 43	DOV; 9	POC; 22	MCH; 12	SON; 3	DAY; 37	CHI; 8	NHA; 2	POC; 1*	IND; 18	GLN; 39	MCH; 7*	BRI; 10	CAL; 12	RCH; 1*	NHA; 35	DOV; 23*	TAL; 8	KAN; 14	CLT; 2	MAR; 6	ATL; 36	TEX; 10	PHO; QL^{†}	HOM	10th	5974	
2006	Penske Racing South	2	Dodge	DAY; 38	**CAL**; 16	LVS; 16	ATL; 37	BRI; 1	MAR; 11	TEX; 34	PHO; 24	TAL; 7	RCH; 29	DAR; 19	CLT; 39	DOV; 16	POC; 2	MCH; 9	**SON**; 5	DAY; 3	CHI; 8	NHA; 38	POC; 2	IND; 12	**GLN**; 19*	MCH; 40	**BRI**; 37	**CAL**; 27	RCH; 27	NHA; 19	DOV; 4	KAN; 25	TAL; 3	CLT; 32	**MAR**; 27	ATL; 14	TEX; 8	PHO; 8	HOM; 43	16th	3900	
2007	Penske Racing South	2	Dodge	DAY; 41*	CAL; 7	LVS; 26	ATL; 11	BRI; 29	MAR; 12	TEX; 11	PHO; 18	TAL; 3	RCH; 5	DAR; 12	CLT; 32*	DOV; 42	POC; 16	MCH; 25	SON; 22	NHA; 21	DAY; 3	CHI; 6	IND; 11	POC; 1*	GLN; 11	MCH; 1*	BRI; 6	**CAL**; 9	RCH; 9	NHA; 25	DOV; 29	KAN; 11*	TAL; 7	CLT; 26	MAR; 21	ATL; 8	TEX; 8	PHO; 12	HOM; 2	7th	6231	
2008	Penske Racing South	2	Dodge	DAY; 2	CAL; 13	LVS; 38	ATL; 11	BRI; 12	MAR; 33	TEX; 23	PHO; 23	TAL; 39	RCH; 42	DAR; 12	CLT; 16	DOV; 20	POC; 8	MCH; 21	SON; 32	NHA; 1	DAY; 4	CHI; 28	IND; 40	POC; 38	GLN; 10	MCH; 36	BRI; 15	CAL; 39	RCH; 10	NHA; 6	DOV; 34	KAN; 30	TAL; 21	CLT; 3	MAR; 36	ATL; 6	TEX; 41	PHO; 2	HOM; 43	18th	3635	
2009	Penske Championship Racing	2	Dodge	DAY; 10	CAL; 5	LVS; 23	ATL; 1*	BRI; 11	MAR; 18	TEX; 8	PHO; 3	TAL; 6	RCH; 12	DAR; 16	CLT; 34	DOV; 5	POC; 37	MCH; 8	SON; 15	NHA; 3	DAY; 5	CHI; 17	IND; 27	POC; 9	GLN; 7	MCH; 36	BRI; 7	ATL; 38	RCH; 2	NHA; 6	DOV; 5	KAN; 11	CAL; 8	CLT; 10	MAR; 17	TAL; 30	TEX; 1	PHO; 6	HOM; 4	4th	6446	
2010	Penske Championship Racing	2	Dodge	DAY; 23	CAL; 6	**LVS**; 35	ATL; 1	BRI; 3*	MAR; 23	PHO; 35	TEX; 4	TAL; 8	RCH; 18	DAR; 3	DOV; 19	CLT; 1*	POC; 6	**MCH**; 3	SON; 32	NHA; 3	DAY; 7	CHI; 26	IND; 10	POC; 33	GLN; 2	MCH; 40	BRI; 9	ATL; 6	RCH; 18	NHA; 13	DOV; 4	KAN; 13	CAL; 21	CLT; 30	MAR; 16	TAL; 30	TEX; 24	PHO; 9	HOM; 18	11th	6142	
2011	Penske Racing	22	Dodge	DAY; 5	PHO; 8	LVS; 9	BRI; 7	CAL; 17	MAR; 16	TEX; 10	TAL; 18	RCH; 22	DAR; 27	DOV; 14	CLT; 4	**KAN**; 9*	**POC**; 2	**MCH**; 11	SON; 1*	DAY; 14	KEN; 9	NHA; 10	IND; 21	POC; 3	GLN; 38	MCH; 34	BRI; 17	ATL; 4	RCH; 5	CHI; 6*	NHA; 22	DOV; 1	KAN; 13	CLT; 13	TAL; 36	MAR; 14	TEX; 30	PHO; 22	HOM; 34	11th	2262	
2012	Phoenix Racing	51	Chevy	DAY; 39	PHO; 15	LVS; 35	BRI; 18	CAL; 9	MAR; 33	TEX; 13	KAN; 17	RCH; 28	TAL; 20	DAR; 21	CLT; 27	DOV; 24	POC	MCH; 30	SON; 3	KEN; 19	DAY; 35	NHA; 24	IND; 36	POC; 30	GLN; 31	MCH; 30	BRI; 28	ATL; 13	RCH; 28	CHI; 32	NHA; 35	DOV; 23	TAL; 39							25th	735	
2012	Furniture Row Racing	78	Chevy																															CLT; 21	KAN; 25	MAR; 15	TEX; 8	PHO; 8	HOM; 9	25th	735	
2013	Furniture Row Racing	78	Chevy	DAY; 28	PHO; 27	LVS; 20	BRI; 4	CAL; 5	MAR; 37	TEX; 37	KAN; 15	RCH; 9	TAL; 30	**DAR**; 14	CLT; 3	DOV; 12	POC; 7	MCH; 35	SON; 4	KEN; 6	DAY; 6	NHA; 31*	IND; 14	POC; 3	GLN; 9	MCH; 3	BRI; 31	ATL; 4	RCH; 2	CHI; 4	NHA; 13	DOV; 21	KAN; 21	CLT; 14	TAL; 18	MAR; 18	TEX; 17	PHO; 5	HOM; 21	10th	2309	
2014	Stewart–Haas Racing	41	Chevy	DAY; 21	PHO; 39	LVS; 26	BRI; 35	CAL; 3	MAR; 1	TEX; 39	DAR; 31	RCH; 23	TAL; 33	KAN; 29	CLT; 40	DOV; 18	POC; 3	MCH; 13	SON; 12	KEN; 12	DAY; 3*	NHA; 17	IND; 28	POC; 13	GLN; 3	MCH; 31	BRI; 5	ATL; 13	RCH; 7	CHI; 8	NHA; 36	DOV; 18	KAN; 42	CLT; 11	TAL; 7	MAR; 36	TEX; 8	PHO; 7	HOM; 11	12th	2263	
2015	Stewart–Haas Racing	41	Chevy	DAY; QL^{‡}	ATL	LVS	PHO; 5	**CAL**; 3*	MAR; 14	**TEX**; 14	BRI; 15	RCH; 1*	TAL; 12	KAN; 8	CLT; 10	DOV; 31	**POC**; 5	MCH; 1	SON; 2	DAY; 5	KEN; 10	NHA; 10	IND; 8	POC; 37	GLN; 5	MCH; 20	BRI; 14	DAR; 6	RCH; 15	CHI; 3	NHA; 19	DOV; 17	CLT; 5	KAN; 6	TAL; 10	MAR; 34	TEX; 7	PHO; 7	HOM; 8	8th	2333	
2016	Stewart–Haas Racing	41	Chevy	DAY; 10	**ATL**; 4	**LVS**; 9	PHO; 6	CAL; 30	MAR; 13	TEX; 9	BRI; 3	RCH; 10	TAL; 8	KAN; 3	DOV; 5	CLT; 6	POC; 1	MCH; 10	SON; 10	DAY; 23	KEN; 4	NHA; 22	IND; 16	POC; 10	GLN; 11	BRI; 38	MCH; 12	DAR; 34	RCH; 8	CHI; 13	NHA; 5	DOV; 15	CLT; 8	KAN; 13	TAL; 4	MAR; 22	TEX; 20	PHO; 5	HOM; 13	7th	2296	
2017	Stewart–Haas Racing	41	Ford	DAY; 1	ATL; 7	LVS; 30	PHO; 25	CAL; 24	MAR; 37	TEX; 10	BRI; 25	RCH; 8	TAL; 6	KAN; 19	CLT; 6	DOV; 37	POC; 4	MCH; 12	SON; 7	DAY; 28	KEN; 30	NHA; 8	IND; 29	POC; 13	GLN; 6	MCH; 11	BRI; 5	DAR; 3	RCH; 4	CHI; 19	NHA; 37	DOV; 20	CLT; 22	TAL; 25	KAN; 2	MAR; 22	**TEX**; 9	PHO; 21	HOM; 22	14th	2217	
2018	Stewart–Haas Racing	41	Ford	DAY; 26	ATL; 8	LVS; 35	PHO; 10	CAL; 14	MAR; 11	**TEX**; 7	BRI; 22	RCH; 11	TAL; 2	DOV; 5	KAN; 8	CLT; 8	POC; 19	**MCH**; 3	SON; 6	CHI; 17	DAY; 37	KEN; 6	**NHA**; 8*	POC; 9	GLN; 9	MCH; 6	BRI; 1	DAR; 6	IND; 6	LVS; 21	RCH; 18	**ROV**; 5	DOV; 5	**TAL**; 14*	KAN; 18	MAR; 6	TEX; 7	PHO; 32	HOM; 10	7th	2350	
2019	Chip Ganassi Racing	1	Chevy	DAY; 25	ATL; 3	LVS; 5	PHO; 7	CAL; 6	MAR; 12	TEX; 9	BRI; 2	RCH; 11	TAL; 6	DOV; 13	KAN; 7	CLT; 27	POC; 11	MCH; 2	SON; 13	CHI; 13	DAY; 10	KEN; 1	NHA; 18	POC; 27	GLN; 10	MCH; 23	BRI; 9	DAR; 7	IND; 30	LVS; 39	RCH; 18	ROV; 20	DOV; 9	TAL; 28	KAN; 4	MAR; 6	TEX; 9	PHO; 11	HOM; 21	13th	2237	
2020	Chip Ganassi Racing	1	Chevy	DAY; 33	LVS; 25	CAL; 3	PHO; 6	DAR; 3	DAR; 15	**CLT**; 7	CLT; 5	BRI; 7	ATL; 6	MAR; 9	HOM; 17	TAL; 9	POC; 18	POC; 13	IND; 13	KEN; 5	TEX; 8	KAN; 9	NHA; 17	MCH; 10	MCH; 10	DRC; 14	DOV; 40	DOV; 13	DAY; 34	DAR; 8	RCH; 13	BRI; 15	LVS; 1	TAL; 32	ROV; 4	KAN; 38	TEX; 7	MAR; 5	PHO; 12	10th	2287	
2021	Chip Ganassi Racing	1	Chevy	DAY; 22	DRC; 4	HOM; 8	LVS; 19	PHO; 15	ATL; 39	BRD; 16	MAR; 21	RCH; 13	TAL; 35	KAN; 15	DAR; 35	DOV; 13	COA; 27	CLT; 38	SON; 6	NSH; 8	POC; 6	POC; 20	ROA; 4	ATL; 1*	NHA; 16	GLN; 13	IRC; 6	MCH; 4	DAY; 12	DAR; 6	RCH; 37	BRI; 19	LVS; 8	TAL; 4	ROV; 25	TEX; 16	KAN; 4	MAR; 7	PHO; 16	11th	2297	
2022	23XI Racing	45	Toyota	DAY; 19	CAL; 8	LVS; 13	PHO; 5	ATL; 3	COA; 32	RCH; 35	MAR; 6	BRD; 32	TAL; 16	DOV; 31	DAR; 28	KAN; 1*	CLT; 31	GTW; 3	SON; 18	NSH; 2	ROA; 23	ATL; 22	NHA; 10	POC; INQ^{¤}	IRC	MCH	RCH	GLN	DAY	DAR	KAN	BRI	TEX	TAL	ROV	LVS	HOM	MAR	PHO	30th	485	
^{†} – Qualified but replaced by Kenny Wallace. · ^{‡} – Qualified but replaced by Regan Smith. · ^{¤} – Qualified but replaced by Ty Gibbs.

===== Daytona 500 =====
Year	Team	Manufacturer	Start	Finish
2001	Roush Racing	Ford	26	41
2002	Roush Racing	Ford	15	4
2003	Roush Racing	Ford	36	2
2004	Roush Racing	Ford	15	16
2005	Roush Racing	Ford	13	2
2006	Penske Racing South	Dodge	13	38
2007	Penske Racing South	Dodge	4	41
2008	Penske Racing South	Dodge	43	2
2009	Penske Championship Racing	Dodge	13	10
2010	Penske Championship Racing	Dodge	10	23
2011	Penske Racing	Dodge	3	5
2012	Phoenix Racing	Chevrolet	28	39
2013	Furniture Row Racing	Chevrolet	11	28
2014	Stewart–Haas Racing	Chevrolet	8	21
2015	Stewart–Haas Racing	Chevrolet	QL^{†}	
2016	Stewart–Haas Racing	Chevrolet	8	10
2017	Stewart–Haas Racing	Ford	8	**1**
2018	Stewart–Haas Racing	Ford	11	26
2019	Chip Ganassi Racing	Chevrolet	12	25
2020	Chip Ganassi Racing	Chevrolet	18	33
2021	Chip Ganassi Racing	Chevrolet	20	22
2022	23XI Racing	Toyota	17	19
^{†} – Qualified but replaced by Regan Smith

==== Nationwide Series ====
NASCAR Nationwide Series results
Year	Team	No.	Make	1	2	3	4	5	6	7	8	9	10	11	12	13	14	15	16	17	18	19	20	21	22	23	24	25	26	27	28	29	30	31	32	33	34	35	NNSC	Pts	Ref
2006	Penske Racing South	39	Dodge	DAY	CAL	MXC	LVS	ATL	BRI	TEX; 1*	NSH	PHO; 4	TAL	RCH	DAR	CLT; 2	DOV; 3	NSH	KEN	MLW	DAY	CHI; 6*	NHA	MAR	GTW	IRP	**GLN**; 1*	MCH; 21	BRI	CAL	RCH	DOV	KAN	CLT	MEM	TEX	PHO	HOM	39th	1160	
2007	Penske Racing South	12	Dodge	DAY	CAL	MXC	LVS; 4	ATL	BRI	NSH	TEX; 8	PHO	TAL	RCH	DAR	CLT; 41	DOV	NSH	KEN	MLW	NHA	DAY	CHI	GTW	IRP	CGV													69th	527	
2007	Penske Racing South	39	Dodge																								**GLN**; 3	MCH	BRI	CAL	RCH	DOV	KAN	CLT	MEM	TEX	PHO	HOM	69th	527	
2011	Penske Racing	22	Dodge	DAY	PHO	LVS	BRI	CAL	TEX	TAL	NSH	RCH	DAR	DOV	IOW	CLT	CHI	MCH	ROA	DAY	KEN	NHA	NSH	IRP	IOW	**GLN**; 1	CGV	BRI	ATL	RCH	CHI	DOV	KAN	CLT	TEX	PHO	HOM		97th	0^{1}	
2012	Phoenix Racing	1	Chevy	DAY; 10	PHO	LVS	BRI	CAL			TAL; 6								DAY; 1	NHA	CHI	IND; 34																	102nd	0^{1}	
2012	Kyle Busch Motorsports	54	Toyota						TEX; 30	RCH; 1		DAR; 8	IOW; 5	CLT	DOV; 4	MCH; 3	ROA; 8	KEN; 2					IOW; 17	GLN	CGV	BRI	ATL	RCH; 3	CHI; 28	KEN	DOV	CLT	KAN	TEX	PHO	HOM			102nd	0^{1}	
2013	Phoenix Racing	1	Chevy	DAY; 35	PHO	LVS	BRI	CAL	TEX	RCH	TAL; 4	DAR	CLT	DOV	IOW	MCH	ROA	KEN	DAY; 4	NHA	CHI	IND	IOW	GLN	MOH	BRI	ATL	RCH	CHI	KEN	DOV	KAN	CLT	TEX	PHO	HOM			104th	0^{1}	

==== Camping World Truck Series ====
NASCAR Camping World Truck Series results
Year	Team	No.	Make	1	2	3	4	5	6	7	8	9	10	11	12	13	14	15	16	17	18	19	20	21	22	23	24	NCWTC	Pts	Ref
2000	Roush Racing	99	Ford	DAY; 2	HOM; 9	PHO; 4	MMR; 2	MAR; 23	PIR; 11	GTW; 21	MEM; 13	PPR; 2	EVG; 5	TEX; 6	KEN; 29	GLN; 2	**MLW**; 1*	NHA; 1	NZH; 14	MCH; 2	IRP; 6	NSV; 12	CIC; 19	**RCH**; 3*	**DOV**; 1	TEX; 3	**CAL**; 1	2nd	3596	
2001	Roush Racing	99	Ford	DAY	HOM	MMR	MAR	GTW	DAR	PPR	DOV	TEX	MEM	MLW; 5	KAN	KEN	NHA	IRP	NSH	CIC	NZH	RCH	SBO	TEX	LVS	PHO	CAL	79th	155	
2012	Kyle Busch Motorsports	18	Toyota	DAY	MAR	CAR	KAN	CLT	DOV	TEX	KEN	IOW	CHI	POC	MCH; 9	BRI					TAL; 7	MAR	TEX	PHO	HOM			87th	0^{1}	
2012	Billy Ballew Motorsports	51	Chevy														ATL; 10	IOW	KEN	LVS								87th	0^{1}	

^{*} Season still in progress
^{1} Ineligible for series points

=== 24 Hours of Daytona ===
(key)

24 Hours of Daytona results
Year	Class	No	Team	Car	Co-drivers	Laps	Position	Class Pos.
2005	DP	49	(United States) Multimatic Motorsports	Ford Multimatic DP	(Canada) Scott Maxwell (United States) Matt Kenseth (United States) Greg Biffle	588	27 ^{DNF}	15 ^{DNF}
2008	DP	9	(United States) Penske-Taylor Racing	Pontiac Riley DP	(Australia) Ryan Briscoe (Brazil) Hélio Castroneves	689	3	3

=== American open–wheel racing results ===
(key)

==== IndyCar Series ====
IndyCar Series results
Year	Team	No.	Chassis	Engine	1	2	3	4	5	6	7	8	9	10	11	12	13	14	15	16	17	18	Rank	Points	Ref
2014	Andretti Autosport	26	Dallara DW12	Honda	STP	LBH	ALA	IMS	INDY; 6	DET	DET	TXS	HOU	HOU	POC	IOW	TOR	TOR	MDO	MIL	SNM	FON	25th	80	

==== Indianapolis 500 ====
Year	Team	Chassis	Engine	Start	Finish
2014	Andretti Autosport	Dallara	Honda	12	6

=== International Race of Champions ===
(key) (Bold – Pole position. * – Most laps led.)

International Race of Champions results
Year	Make	1	2	3	4	Pos.	Points	Ref
2003	Pontiac	DAY; 2	TAL; 1*	CHI; 3	IND; 4	1st	69	
2004	Pontiac	DAY; 2	TEX; 11	RCH; 3	ATL; 4	5th	46	
2005	Pontiac	DAY; 9	TEX; 11	RCH; 2*	ATL; 12	6th	43	

Sporting positions
Preceded by Matt Kenseth	NASCAR Nextel Cup Series Champion; 2004	Succeeded by Tony Stewart
Preceded by Kevin Harvick	IROC XXVII Champion; 2003	Succeeded by Matt Kenseth
Preceded by Steve Portenga	NASCAR Featherlite Southwest Tour Champion; 1999	Succeeded by Matt Crafton
Achievements
Preceded by Tony Stewart	NASCAR Sprint All-Star Race Winner; 2010	Succeeded by Carl Edwards
Preceded by Kevin Harvick	Budweiser Shootout Winner; 2011	Succeeded by Kyle Busch
Preceded by David Reutimann	Coca-Cola 600 Winner; 2010	Succeeded by Kevin Harvick
Preceded by Denny Hamlin	Daytona 500 Winner; 2017	Succeeded by Austin Dillon
Awards
Preceded by Mike Stefanik	NASCAR Craftsman Truck Series Rookie of the Year; 2000	Succeeded by Travis Kvapil
Preceded by Carlos Muñoz	Indianapolis 500 Rookie of the Year; 2014	Succeeded by Gabby Chaves
