= 2010 NASCAR Sprint All-Star Race =

26th iteration of the NASCAR All-Star Race

Location	Charlotte Motor Speedway in Concord, North Carolina
Date	May 22, 2010
Laps	100 (one 50-lap segment, two 20 lap segments and ten green flag laps)
Distance	150 miles (240 km) [segment 1: 75 miles (121 km); segments 2 and 3: 30 miles (48 km); final segment: 15 miles (24 km) – green flag laps only]
Winner	Kurt Busch
Showdown Winners	Martin Truex Jr. Greg Biffle
Fan Vote	Carl Edwards
Average speed	94.175 miles per hour (151.560 km/h)
Polesitter	Kurt Busch (due to rainout of qualifying)
Most Laps Led	Jimmie Johnson (56 laps)
- Television
Network	Speed
Announcers	Mike Joy, Darrell Waltrip and Larry McReynolds

The 2010 NASCAR Sprint Showdown and Sprint All-Star Race was the 26th running of NASCAR's special non-points race involving winners of the 2009 and 2010 NASCAR Sprint Cup Series races through the 2010 Autism Speaks 400 as well as Sprint All-Star Race 2000–2009 winners, when the event was known as "The Winston" and the "Nextel All-Star Challenge", and past Sprint Cup champions from the decade covering 2000 to 2009, including the "Winston Cup" (2000–2003) and "Nextel Cup" (2004–2007) eras. The event was run at the 1.5 miles (2.4 km) Charlotte Motor Speedway in the Charlotte, North Carolina suburb of Concord on May 22, 2010. Speed provided television coverage in the US while MRN (over-the-air/terrestrial) and SiriusXM (satellite) held radio rights. Kurt Busch won the race and the $1 million prize.

== Race format ==
The format of the race was follows:

- One fifty-lap segment with a mandatory four-tire green flag pit stop at or around Lap 25;
- Two twenty-lap segments with a ten-minute break following Segment Three;
- A ten-lap green flag segment.

Pits were open following the end of the first two segments, where drivers could have opted to take a pit stop, but could have sacrificed their position on the track should they chose to do so. After the first pace lap following the break, teams were required to take a four-tire stop. The order they came out determined the starting order for the last segment.

The qualifying session for eligible drivers was to have consisted of three laps instead of the standard two, including a pit stop after either of the first two laps, slowing to the speed limit of 45 mph entering pit road, but going full throttle as they exit. However, a rainstorm the night before (May 21) cancelled the event, and the first 19 positions were chosen by qualifying order; as a result, Kurt Busch and Joey Logano made up the front row.

== Eligible drivers ==
The following drivers qualified for the race in these categories:

=== Past Series Champion drivers ===
The following six drivers were eligible in the Past Champions category:

- 48-Jimmie Johnson (four-time series champion, most recently 2009)
- 14-Tony Stewart (two-time series champion, most recently 2005; also defending race champion)
- 2-Kurt Busch (2004 series champion)
- 17-Matt Kenseth (2003 series champion)
- 24-Jeff Gordon (four-time series champion, most recently 2001)
- 71-Bobby Labonte (2000 series champion)

=== Past All-Star race-winning drivers ===
The following five drivers were eligible as a past winner of the event in the last decade:

- 9-Kasey Kahne (Sprint All-Star Race XXIV winner) (2008)
- 29-Kevin Harvick (Sprint All-Star Race XXIII winner) (2007)
- 5-Mark Martin (Sprint All-Star Race XXI winner) (2005)
- 39-Ryan Newman (Sprint All-Star Race XVIII winner)(2002)
- 88-Dale Earnhardt Jr. (Sprint All-Star Race XVI winner) (2000)

=== 2009 or 2010 race winners ===
The following eight drivers were eligible by winning a Sprint Cup points race in 2009 or 2010:

- 18-Kyle Busch (2009 Shelby 427)
- 12-Brad Keselowski (2009 Aaron's 499)^{§}
- 00-David Reutimann (2009 Coca-Cola 600)
- 20-Joey Logano (2009 Lenox Industrial Tools 301)
- 11-Denny Hamlin (2009 Sunoco Red Cross Pennsylvania 500)
- 83-Brian Vickers (2009 Carfax 400)^{†}
- 1-Jamie McMurray (2009 AMP Energy 500)^{§}

§ – McMurray was the winning driver in the #26 Roush Fenway Racing Ford in the AMP Energy 500; that team would later be owned by Latitude 43 Motorsports, and McMurray became the driver of the #1 Earnhardt Ganassi Racing Chevrolet for the 2010 season, also winning the 2010 Daytona 500. The #09 team for which Brad Keselowski drove to victory in the Aaron's 499, as well as the #26 team were not eligible unless:

a) the team won a race prior to May 16;
b) won one of the two top positions of the Sprint Showdown or
c) Aric Almirola, who drove the #09 car or either David Stremme or Boris Said, the respective drivers of the new #26 car, were selected in the fan poll.

In the end, neither Phoenix or Latitude 43 attempted even the Showdown. The full-time #66 of Prism Motorsports, driven by Dave Blaney, also did not attempt the Showdown.

† – On May 13, Vickers was sidelined with blood clots in his legs and chest, and Casey Mears replaced him as the interim driver in the #83 Red Bull Racing Toyota. Mears would not have qualified for the event; NASCAR gave the team approval for the driver switch.

For those not listed above, a special race, The Sprint Showdown, consisting of two halves of 20 laps [30 miles (48 km)] each was held prior to the main event. The top two finishers – Martin Truex Jr. and Greg Biffle – and a driver chosen by a fan poll – Carl Edwards – were promoted to the main event. Only winning drivers, not teams, were eligible to race in the All-Star Race.

== Entry lists ==
=== Showdown ===
#	Driver	Team	Make
6	David Ragan	Roush Fenway Racing	Ford
7	Robby Gordon	Robby Gordon Motorsports	Toyota
13	Max Papis	Germain Racing	Toyota
16	Greg Biffle	Roush Fenway Racing	Ford
19	Elliott Sadler	Richard Petty Motorsports	Ford
21	Bill Elliott	Wood Brothers Racing	Ford
31	Jeff Burton	Richard Childress Racing	Chevrolet
32	Reed Sorenson	Braun Racing	Toyota
33	Clint Bowyer	Richard Childress Racing	Chevrolet
34	Travis Kvapil	Front Row Motorsports	Ford
36	Tony Raines	Tommy Baldwin Racing	Chevrolet
37	Kevin Conway (R)	Front Row Motorsports	Ford
38	David Gilliland	Front Row Motorsports	Ford
42	Juan Pablo Montoya	Earnhardt Ganassi Racing	Chevrolet
43	A. J. Allmendinger	Richard Petty Motorsports	Ford
46	J. J. Yeley	Whitney Motorsports	Dodge
47	Marcos Ambrose	JTG Daugherty Racing	Toyota
55	Michael Waltrip	Prism Motorsports	Toyota
56	Martin Truex Jr.	Michael Waltrip Racing	Toyota
57	Norm Benning	Norm Benning Racing	Chevrolet
64	Todd Bodine	Gunselman Motorsports	Toyota
75	Derrike Cope	Stratus Racing Group	Dodge
77	Sam Hornish Jr.	Penske Championship Racing	Dodge
78	Regan Smith	Furniture Row Racing	Chevrolet
82	Scott Speed	Red Bull Racing Team	Toyota
87	Joe Nemechek	NEMCO Motorsports	Toyota
92	Robert Richardson Jr.	K-Automotive Motorsports	Dodge
98	Paul Menard	Richard Petty Motorsports	Ford
99	Carl Edwards	Roush Fenway Racing	Ford

=== All-Star Race ===
#	Driver	Team	Make
00	David Reutimann	Michael Waltrip Racing	Toyota
1	Jamie McMurray	Earnhardt Ganassi Racing	Chevrolet
2	Kurt Busch	Penske Championship Racing	Dodge
5	Mark Martin	Hendrick Motorsports	Chevrolet
9	Kasey Kahne	Richard Petty Motorsports	Ford
11	Denny Hamlin	Joe Gibbs Racing	Toyota
12	Brad Keselowski (R)	Penske Championship Racing	Dodge
14	Tony Stewart	Stewart–Haas Racing	Chevrolet
17	Matt Kenseth	Roush Fenway Racing	Ford
18	Kyle Busch	Joe Gibbs Racing	Toyota
20	Joey Logano	Joe Gibbs Racing	Toyota
24	Jeff Gordon	Hendrick Motorsports	Chevrolet
29	Kevin Harvick	Richard Childress Racing	Chevrolet
39	Ryan Newman	Stewart–Haas Racing	Chevrolet
48	Jimmie Johnson	Hendrick Motorsports	Chevrolet
71	Bobby Labonte	TRG Motorsports	Chevrolet
83	Casey Mears	Red Bull Racing Team	Toyota
88	Dale Earnhardt Jr.	Hendrick Motorsports	Chevrolet

== Qualifying results ==
=== Showdown ===
Pos.	#	Driver
1	6	David Ragan
2	13	Max Papis
3	77	Sam Hornish Jr.
4	37	Kevin Conway (R)
5	16	Greg Biffle
6	32	Reed Sorenson
7	21	Bill Elliott
8	43	A.J. Allmendinger
9	33	Clint Bowyer
10	7	Robby Gordon
11	78	Regan Smith
12	98	Paul Menard
13	55	Michael Waltrip
14	42	Juan Pablo Montoya
15	57	Norm Benning
16	19	Elliott Sadler
17	31	Jeff Burton
18	82	Scott Speed
19	47	Marcos Ambrose
20	56	Martin Truex Jr.
21	64	Todd Bodine
22	92	Robert Richardson Jr.
23	46	J. J. Yeley
24	34	Travis Kvapil
25	87	Joe Nemechek
26	99	Carl Edwards
27	36	Tony Raines
28	75	Derrike Cope
29	38	David Gilliland

=== All-Star Race ===
Pos.	#	Driver
1	2	Kurt Busch
2	20	Joey Logano
3	12	Brad Keselowski
4	1	Jamie McMurray
5	18	Kyle Busch
6	00	David Reutimann
7	48	Jimmie Johnson
8	24	Jeff Gordon
9	83	Casey Mears
10	39	Ryan Newman
11	14	Tony Stewart
12	11	Denny Hamlin
13	29	Kevin Harvick
14	17	Matt Kenseth
15	5	Mark Martin
16	9	Kasey Kahne
17	71	Bobby Labonte
18	88	Dale Earnhardt Jr.
19	56	Martin Truex Jr.
20	16	Greg Biffle
21	99	Carl Edwards

== Race results ==
=== Showdown ===
Pos.	#	Driver	Laps	Led	Status
1	56	Martin Truex Jr.	40	8	running
2	16	Greg Biffle	40	12	running
3	31	Jeff Burton	40	0	running
4	98	Paul Menard	40	0	running
5	47	Marcos Ambrose	40	0	running
6	6	David Ragan	40	20	running
7	77	Sam Hornish Jr.	40	0	running
8	43	A.J. Allmendinger	40	0	running
9	34	Travis Kvapil	40	0	running
10	99	Carl Edwards	40	0	running
11	19	Elliott Sadler	40	0	running
12	21	Bill Elliott	40	0	running
13	32	Reed Sorenson	40	0	running
14	82	Scott Speed	40	0	running
15	7	Robby Gordon	40	0	running
16	13	Max Papis	40	0	running
17	46	J.J. Yeley	40	0	running
18	37	Kevin Conway (R)	40	0	running
19	75	Derrike Cope	40	0	running
20	57	Norm Benning	40	0	running
21	92	Robert Richardson Jr.	39	0	running
22	55	Michael Waltrip	38	0	running
23	33	Clint Bowyer	34	0	crash
24	38	David Gilliland	21	0	crash
25	36	Tony Raines	18	0	suspension
26	78	Regan Smith	16	0	crash
27	42	Juan Pablo Montoya	16	0	crash
28	64	Todd Bodine	13	0	transmission
29	87	Joe Nemechek	7	0	electrical

=== All-Star Race ===
Pos.	#	Driver	Laps	Led	Status
1	2	Kurt Busch	100	19	running
2	56	Martin Truex Jr.	100	0	running
3	20	Joey Logano	100	0	running
4	11	Denny Hamlin	100	2	running
5	14	Tony Stewart	100	0	running
6	29	Kevin Harvick	100	0	running
7	12	Brad Keselowski (R)	100	0	running
8	17	Matt Kenseth	100	0	running
9	16	Greg Biffle	100	0	running
10	71	Bobby Labonte	100	0	running
11	39	Ryan Newman	100	0	running
12	88	Dale Earnhardt Jr.	100	0	running
13	48	Jimmie Johnson	100	56	running
14	18	Kyle Busch	98	23	crash
15	9	Kasey Kahne	98	0	crash
16	83	Casey Mears	95	0	crash
17	5	Mark Martin	90	0	crash
18	1	Jamie McMurray	90	0	crash
19	00	David Reutimann	90	0	crash
20	24	Jeff Gordon	90	0	crash
21	99	Carl Edwards	90	0	crash

== Other events ==
=== Induction of the Charter Class to the NASCAR Hall of Fame ===
On October 14, 2009, the Charter Class of the NASCAR Hall of Fame were announced, consisting of Bill France Sr., the organization's founder, his son Bill France Jr., seven time series champions Richard Petty and Dale Earnhardt and former driver-owner Junior Johnson. The formal inductions were held on Sunday, May 23 on the Ceremonial Plaza of the new building.

=== Craftsman All-Star Pit Crew Challenge ===
The annual Craftsman All-Star Pit Crew Challenge competition was held on the Wednesday prior to the event at the Time Warner Cable Arena. Denny Hamlin's #11 team dethroned Jeff Burton's #31 team as champions, and earned the right to be the first team to choose their pit stall for the race.

=== Pennzoil Ultra Victory Challenge ===
The third annual Pennzoil Ultra Victory Challenge – judged by former driver Jimmy Spencer, TNA wrestler Jeff Hardy, Carolina Panthers wide receiver Steve Smith along with Scott Stapp and Mark Tremonti from the rock group Creed – was held prior to the All-Star Race. Joey Logano won the event with 67 points.
