= IROC XIX =

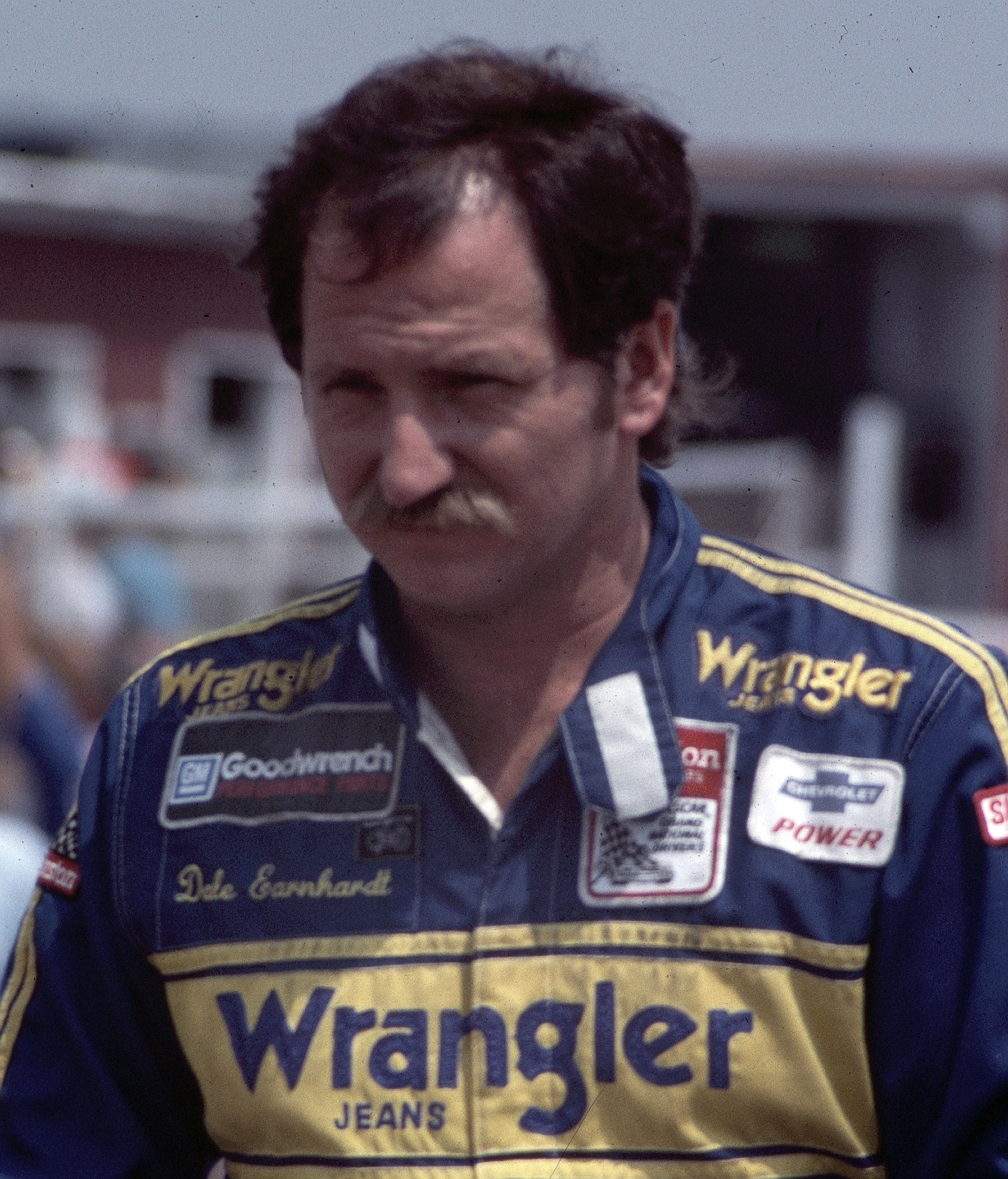
Dale Earnhardt (seen in 1985), the IROC XIX champion

IROC XIX was the nineteenth year of IROC competition, which took place in 1995. It was the second and final year the Dodge Avenger was used in competition, and continued the format introduced in IROC XVIII. Race one took place on the Daytona International Speedway, race two took place at Darlington Raceway, race three ran at Talladega Superspeedway, and the year finished at Michigan International Speedway. Dale Earnhardt won his second series championship and $225,000.

The roster of drivers and final points standings were as follows:

| Position | Driver | Points | Winnings | Series |
|---|---|---|---|---|
| 1 | (United States) Dale Earnhardt | 61 | $225,000 | NASCAR Winston Cup |
| 2 | (United States) Mark Martin | 57 | $100,000 | NASCAR Winston Cup; Defending IROC Champion |
| 3 | (United States) Scott Pruett | 53 | $60,000 | 1995: IndyCar; 1994: SCCA Trans-Am Series; 1994 Trans-Am Champion |
| 4 | (United States) Jeff Gordon | 51 | $50,000 | NASCAR Winston Cup |
| 5 | (United States) Tom Kendall | 49 | $45,000 | SCCA Trans-Am Series |
| 6 | (United States) Ken Schrader | 43 | $40,000 | NASCAR Winston Cup |
| 7 | (United States) Al Unser Jr.^{1} | 42 | $40,000 | IndyCar |
| 8 | (United States) Steve Kinser^{1} | 42 | $40,000 | World of Outlaws Sprint Car Series |
| 9 | (United States) Rusty Wallace | 33 | $40,000 | NASCAR Winston Cup |
| 10 | (United States) Ricky Rudd | 32 | $40,000 | NASCAR Winston Cup |
| 11 | (United States) Hurley Haywood | 22 | $40,000 | IMSA World Sports Car |
| 12 | (New Zealand) Steve Millen | 20 | $40,000 | IMSA World Sports Car |

== Race results ==
=== Race One, Daytona International Speedway ===
Friday, February 17, 1995

| Finish | Grid | Car no. | Driver | Car Make | Car Color | Laps | Status | Laps Led | Points |
|---|---|---|---|---|---|---|---|---|---|
| 1 | 2 | 2 | (United States) Dale Earnhardt | Dodge Avenger | Aqua | 40 | 0:33:12 | 9 | 24** |
| 2 | 5 | 5 | (United States) Scott Pruett | Dodge Avenger | Lime | 40 | Running | 4 | 19*** |
| 3 | 8 | 8 | (United States) Ken Schrader | Dodge Avenger | Cream | 40 | Running | | 14 |
| 4 | 1 | 1 | (United States) Ricky Rudd | Dodge Avenger | Orange | 40 | Running | 1 | 12 |
| 5 | 6 | 6 | (United States) Rusty Wallace | Dodge Avenger | Powder Blue | 40 | Running | | 10 |
| 6 | 10 | 10 | (United States) Tom Kendall | Dodge Avenger | Yellow | 40 | Running | | 9 |
| 7 | 11 | 11 | (United States) Steve Kinser | Dodge Avenger | White | 40 | Running | | 8 |
| 8 | 7 | 7 | (United States) Mark Martin | Dodge Avenger | Dark Blue | 40 | Running | | 7 |
| 9 | 4 | 4 | (New Zealand) Steve Millen | Dodge Avenger | Silver | 40 | Running | | 6 |
| 10 | 3 | 3 | (United States) Al Unser Jr. | Dodge Avenger | Green | 39 | Crash | 22 | 10* |
| 11 | 12 | 12 | (United States) Jeff Gordon | Dodge Avenger | Pink | 28 | Transmission | 4 | 6*** |
| 12 | 9 | 9 | (United States) Hurley Haywood | Dodge Avenger | Red | 24 | Running | | 3 |

one *: Bonus points for leading the most laps.
two **: Bonus points for leading the 2nd most laps.
three ***: Bonus points for leading the 3rd most laps.

Average speed: 180.723 mph
Cautions: none
Margin of victory: 2 cl
Lead changes: 14

=== Race Two, Darlington Raceway ===
Saturday, March 25, 1995

| Finish | Grid | Car no. | Driver | Car Make | Car Color | Laps | Status | Laps Led | Points |
|---|---|---|---|---|---|---|---|---|---|
| 1 | 4 | 9 | (United States) Mark Martin | Dodge Avenger | Aqua | 60 | 0:32:00 | 57 | 26* |
| 2 | 2 | 11 | (United States) Jeff Gordon | Dodge Avenger | Silver | 60 | Running | 3 | 20** |
| 3 | 9 | 3 | (United States) Ken Schrader | Dodge Avenger | Mustard | 60 | Running | | 14 |
| 4 | 6 | 7 | (United States) Tom Kendall | Dodge Avenger | Lime | 60 | Running | | 12 |
| 5 | 10 | 2 | (United States) Scott Pruett | Dodge Avenger | Medium Blue | 60 | Running | | 10 |
| 6 | 1 | 12 | (United States) Hurley Haywood | Dodge Avenger | Powder Blue | 60 | Running | | 9 |
| 7 | 5 | 8 | (United States) Steve Kinser | Dodge Avenger | Teal | 59 | Running | | 8 |
| 8 | 11 | 1 | (United States) Dale Earnhardt | Dodge Avenger | Orange | 20 | Crash | | 7 |
| 9 | 3 | 10 | (New Zealand) Steve Millen | Dodge Avenger | Salmon | 17 | Crash | | 6 |
| 10 | 7 | 5 | (United States) Rusty Wallace | Dodge Avenger | Purple | 17 | Crash | | 5 |
| 11 | 8 | 4 | (United States) Ricky Rudd | Dodge Avenger | White | 17 | Crash | | 4 |
| 12 | X | 6 | (United States) Al Unser Jr. ^{2} | Dodge Avenger | Not Assigned | 0 | Did Not Start, Injured | | 3 |

one *: Bonus points for leading the most laps.
two **: Bonus points for leading the 2nd most laps.
three ***: Bonus points for leading the 3rd most laps.

Average speed: 153.675 mph
Cautions: 1
Margin of victory: .66 sec
Lead changes: 1

Cautions

| From Lap | To Lap | Reason |
|---|---|---|
| 17 | 17 | Dale Earnhardt, Steve Millen, Rusty Wallace, Ricky Rudd accident turn 2 |

=== Race Three, Talladega Superspeedway ===
Saturday, April 29, 1995

| Finish | Grid | Car no. | Driver | Car Make | Car Color | Laps | Status | Laps Led | Points |
|---|---|---|---|---|---|---|---|---|---|
| 1 | 10 | 2 | Dale Earnhardt | Dodge Avenger | Tan | 38 | 0:32:21 | 17 | 26* |
| 2 | 5 | 7 | Steve Kinser | Dodge Avenger | Orange | 38 | Running | | 17 |
| 3 | 11 | 1 | Mark Martin | Dodge Avenger | Mustard | 38 | Running | | 14 |
| 4 | 9 | 3 | Scott Pruett | Dodge Avenger | Pink | 38 | Running | 1 | 12 |
| 5 | 7 | 5 | Jeff Gordon | Dodge Avenger | Dark Blue | 38 | Running | 10 | 13** |
| 6 | 6 | 6 | Tom Kendall | Dodge Avenger | Teal | 38 | Running | | 9 |
| 7 | 8 | 4 | Ken Schrader | Dodge Avenger | Light Blue | 38 | Running | 5 | 10*** |
| 8 | 4 | 8 | Ricky Rudd | Dodge Avenger | Yellow | 38 | Running | 3 | 7 |
| 9 | 3 | 9 | Rusty Wallace | Dodge Avenger | Medium Blue | 38 | Running | 2 | 6 |
| 10 | 1 | 12 | Steve Millen | Dodge Avenger | Lime | 38 | Running | | 5 |
| 11 | 2 | 11 | Hurley Haywood | Dodge Avenger | Powder Blue | 38 | Running | | 4 |
| 12 | X | 10 | Al Unser Jr. ^{2} | Dodge Avenger | Not Assigned | 0 | Did Not Start, Injured | | 3 |

one *: Bonus points for leading the most laps.
two **: Bonus points for leading the 2nd most laps.
three ***: Bonus points for leading the 3rd most laps.

Average speed: 187.474 mph
Cautions: none
Margin of victory: .5 cl
Lead changes: 13

Lap Leader Breakdown

| Driver | From Lap | To Lap | Number of Laps |
|---|---|---|---|
| Rusty Wallace | 1 | 2 | 2 |
| Ken Schrader | 3 | 7 | 5 |
| Dale Earnhardt | 8 | 8 | 1 |
| Ricky Rudd | 9 | 9 | 1 |
| Scott Pruett | 10 | 10 | 1 |
| Ricky Rudd | 11 | 12 | 2 |
| Dale Earnhardt | 13 | 13 | 1 |
| Jeff Gordon | 14 | 15 | 2 |
| Dale Earnhardt | 16 | 22 | 7 |
| Jeff Gordon | 23 | 23 | 1 |
| Dale Earnhardt | 24 | 30 | 7 |
| Jeff Gordon | 31 | 37 | 7 |
| Dale Earnhardt | 38 | 38 | 1 |

=== Race Four, Michigan International Speedway ===
Saturday, July 29, 1995

| Finish | Grid | Car no. | Driver | Car Make | Car Color | Laps | Status | Laps Led | Points |
|---|---|---|---|---|---|---|---|---|---|
| 1 | 1 | 12 | Al Unser Jr. | Dodge Avenger | Green | 50 | 0:35:58 | 20 | 26* |
| 2 | 5 | 7 | Tom Kendall | Dodge Avenger | Black | 50 | Running | 7 | 19*** |
| 3 | 7 | 5 | Jeff Gordon | Dodge Avenger | Dark Blue | 50 | Running | 5 | 14 |
| 4 | 9 | 3 | Scott Pruett | Dodge Avenger | Blue | 50 | Running | | 12 |
| 5 | 10 | 2 | Mark Martin | Dodge Avenger | Lime | 50 | Running | | 10 |
| 6 | 6 | 6 | Steve Kinser | Dodge Avenger | Cream | 50 | Running | | 9 |
| 7 | 3 | 9 | Rusty Wallace | Dodge Avenger | Pink | 50 | Running | 18 | 11** |
| 8 | 8 | 4 | Ken Schrader | Dodge Avenger | Cream | 50 | Running | | 7 |
| 9 | 2 | 11 | Hurley Haywood | Dodge Avenger | Yellow | 50 | Running | | 6 |
| 10 | 4 | 8 | Ricky Rudd | Dodge Avenger | Powder Blue | 49 | Running | | 5 |
| 11 | 11 | 1 | Dale Earnhardt | Dodge Avenger | Red | 7 | Mechanical | | 4 |
| 12 | X | 9 | Steve Millen ^{3} | Dodge Avenger | Not Assigned | 0 | Did Not Start, Injured | | 3 |

one *: Bonus points for leading the most laps.
two **: Bonus points for leading the 2nd most laps.
three ***: Bonus points for leading the 3rd most laps.

Average speed: 166.764 mph
Cautions: 1 (Lap 3, Scott Pruett spin turn 2)
Margin of victory: .112 sec
Lead changes: 5

== Notes ==
1. Al Unser Jr. and Steve Kinser tied for 7th place in the final championship standings; Unser Jr. was awarded the position due to a higher finishing position in the final race.
2. Al Unser Jr. did not start races two and three due to injury
3. Steve Millen did not compete in race four due to injury
