= IROC XVIII =

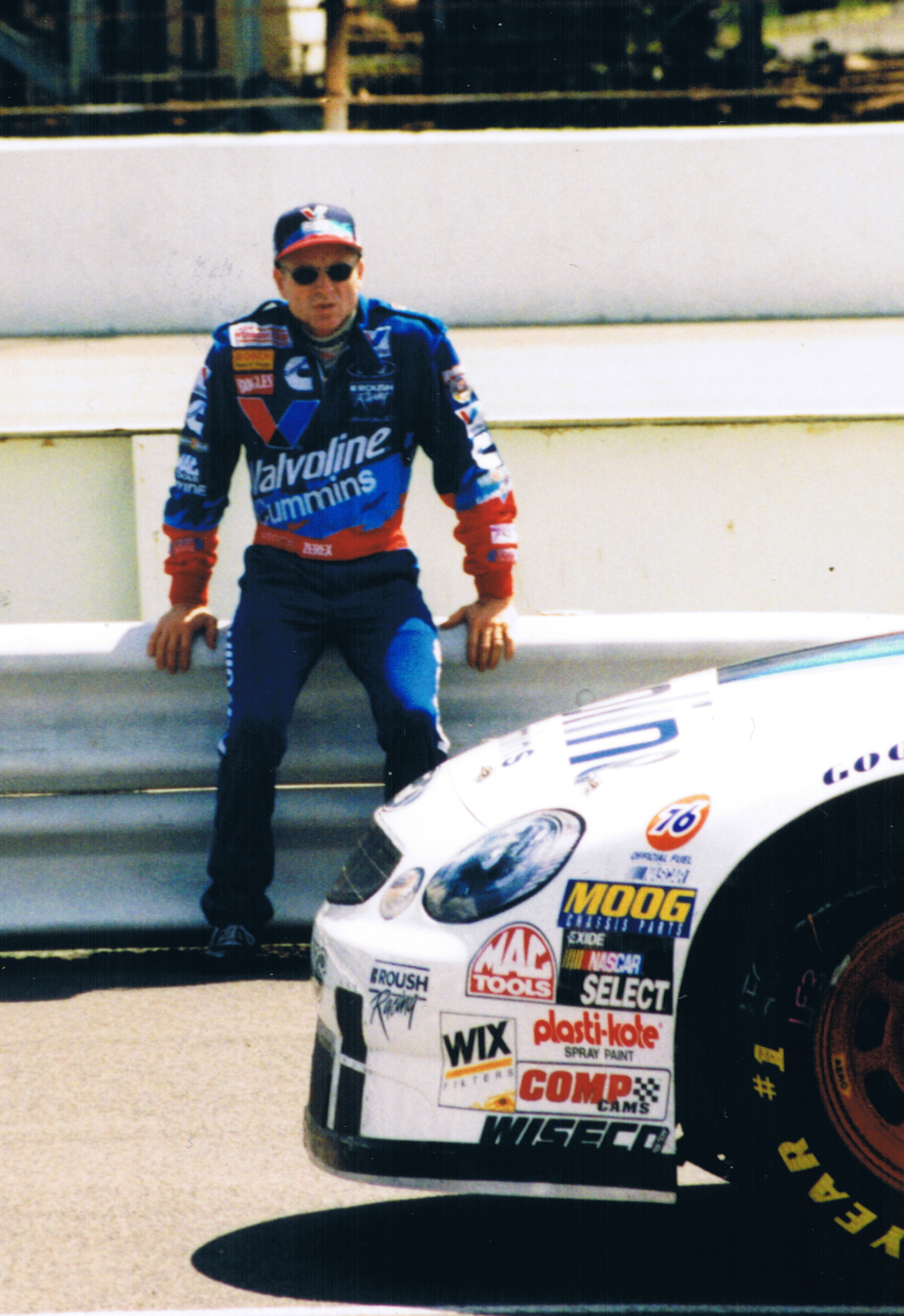
Mark Martin (seen in 1998), the IROC XVIII champion

IROC XVIII was the eighteenth year of IROC competition, which took place in 1994. It was the first year the Dodge Avenger was used in competition, replacing the Dodge Daytona, and continued the format introduced in IROC XVIII. Race one took place on the Daytona International Speedway, race two took place at Darlington Raceway, race three ran at Talladega Superspeedway, and the year finished at Michigan International Speedway. Mark Martin won the series championship, and $200,000.

The roster of drivers and final points standings were as follows:

Position	Driver	Points	Winnings	Series
1	(United States) Mark Martin	66	$200,000	NASCAR Winston Cup
2	(United States) Al Unser Jr. ^{1}	56	$100,000	IndyCar
3	(United States) Rusty Wallace ^{1}	56	$60,000	NASCAR Winston Cup
4	(United States) Dale Earnhardt ^{1}	56	$50,000	NASCAR Winston Cup
5	(United States) Jack Baldwin	45	$48,000	SCCA Trans-Am Series
6	(United States) Steve Kinser	43	$40,000	World of Outlaws Sprint Car Series
7	(United States) Kyle Petty	35	$40,000	NASCAR Winston Cup
8	(United States) Dale Jarrett	34	$40,000	NASCAR Winston Cup
9	(United States) Tommy Kendall	33	$40,000	SCCA Trans-Am Series
10	(United States) Danny Sullivan	27	$40,000	NASCAR Winston Cup; 24 Hours of Le Mans; IndyCar-broadcaster
11	(Australia) Geoff Brabham	26	$40,000	IMSA World Sports Car
12	(United States) Scott Sharp	22	$40,000	SCCA Trans-Am Series

== Race results ==
=== Race One, Daytona International Speedway ===
Friday, February 18, 1994

Finish	Grid	Car no.	Driver	Car Make	Car Color	Laps	Status	Laps Led	Points
1	1	1	(United States) Dale Earnhardt	Dodge Avenger	Green	40	0:33:13	7	21
2	8	8	(United States) Al Unser Jr.	Dodge Avenger	Red	40	Running	9	20**
3	9	9	(United States) Dale Jarrett	Dodge Avenger	Black	40	Running	2	14
4	7	7	(United States) Mark Martin	Dodge Avenger	Purple	40	Running	8	14***
5	12	12	(United States) Kyle Petty	Dodge Avenger	Teal	40	Running		10
6	6	6	(United States) Rusty Wallace	Dodge Avenger	Orange	40	Running	14	14*
7	11	11	(United States) Steve Kinser	Dodge Avenger	Pink	40	Running		8
8	10	10	(Australia) Geoff Brabham	Dodge Avenger	Silver	40	Running		7
9	5	5	(United States) Danny Sullivan	Dodge Avenger	White	40	Running		6
10	2	2	(United States) Jack Baldwin	Dodge Avenger	Yellow	39	Running		5
11	3	3	(United States) Scott Sharp	Dodge Avenger	Mustard	23	Crash		4
12	4	4	(United States) Tom Kendall	Dodge Avenger	Cream	12	Mechanical		3

one *: Bonus points for leading the most laps.
two **: Bonus points for leading the 2nd most laps.
three ***: Bonus points for leading the 3rd most laps.

Average speed: 180.632 mph
Cautions: 1 (lap 23, Scott Sharp Crash)
Margin of victory: .5 cl
Lead changes: 13

=== Race Two, Darlington Raceway ===
Saturday, March 26, 1994

Finish	Grid	Car no.	Driver	Car Make	Car Color	Laps	Status	Laps Led	Points
1	9	4	(United States) Mark Martin	Dodge Avenger	Cream	46	0:26:10	38	26*
2	7	5	(United States) Rusty Wallace	Dodge Avenger	Pink	46	Running		17
3	3	10	(United States) Jack Baldwin	Dodge Avenger	Black	46	Running	8	17**
4	12	1	(United States) Dale Earnhardt	Dodge Avenger	Orange	46	Running		12
5	8	6	(United States) Kyle Petty	Dodge Avenger	Purple	46	Running		10
6	2	11	(United States) Scott Sharp	Dodge Avenger	Aqua	46	Running		9
7	1	12	(United States) Tom Kendall	Dodge Avenger	Silver	41	Running		8
8	5	8	(Australia) Geoff Brabham	Dodge Avenger	Teal	37	Mechanical		7
9	4	9	(United States) Danny Sullivan	Dodge Avenger	Red	15	Mechanical		6
10	11	2	(United States) Al Unser Jr.	Dodge Avenger	Yellow	12	Mechanical		5
11	6	7	(United States) Steve Kinser	Dodge Avenger	Gold	9	Crash		4
12	10	3	(United States) Dale Jarrett	Dodge Avenger	White	9	Crash		3

one *: Bonus points for leading the most laps.
two **: Bonus points for leading the 2nd most laps.
three ***: Bonus points for leading the 3rd most laps (did not occur in this race so not awarded).

Average speed: 144.083 mph
Cautions: 3
Margin of victory: .25 sec
Lead changes: 2

Notes:

This race was originally scheduled for 60 laps with a break in-between but was shortened to 46 laps due to an extra long break. During the first half of the race the teams were having overheating problems due to rubber build up on the grills on the cars. It got so bad that Dave Marcis and other IROC officials were using wire brushes to clean the grills on the cars. They also had to check the water in the radiator of the cars due to the overheating problems. Due to the long break IROC shortened the race to 46 laps. The track had second round qualifying for the NASCAR Winston Cup Series and the NASCAR Busch Grand National race later in the day to get in, forcing IROC to shorten the race.

=== Race Three, Talladega Superspeedway ===
Saturday, April 30, 1994

Finish	Grid	Car no.	Driver	Car Make	Car Color	Laps	Status	Laps Led	Points
1	2	11	(United States) Steve Kinser	Dodge Avenger	Red	38	0:32:33	25	26*
2	8	5	(United States) Jack Baldwin	Dodge Avenger	Orange	38	Running		17
3	6	7	(United States) Dale Jarrett	Dodge Avenger	Yellow	38	Running		14
4	1	12	(United States) Tom Kendall	Dodge Avenger	Aqua	38	Running		12
5	9	4	(United States) Al Unser Jr.	Dodge Avenger	Purple	38	Running	1	10
6	3	10	(United States) Danny Sullivan	Dodge Avenger	Cream	38	Running	1	9
7	7	6	(United States) Kyle Petty	Dodge Avenger	Silver	38	Running		8
8	11	2	(United States) Dale Earnhardt	Dodge Avenger	Black	38	Running	4	9***
9	10	3	(United States) Rusty Wallace	Dodge Avenger	Dark Orange	38	Running		6
10	4	9	(United States) Scott Sharp	Dodge Avenger	Lime	38	Running		5
11	5	8	(Australia) Geoff Brabham	Dodge Avenger	Teal	38	Running		4
12	12	1	(United States) Mark Martin	Dodge Avenger	Mustard	37	Running	7	6**

one *: Bonus points for leading the most laps.
two **: Bonus points for leading the 2nd most laps.
three ***: Bonus points for leading the 3rd most laps.

Average speed: 186.323 mph
Cautions: 1
Margin of victory: .37 sec
Lead changes: 6

=== Race Four, Michigan International Speedway ===
Saturday, July 30, 1994

Finish	Grid	Car no.	Driver	Car Make	Car Color	Laps	Status	Laps Led	Points
1	7	6	(United States) Al Unser Jr.	Dodge Avenger	Lime	50	0:39:54	4	21
2	12	1	(United States) Mark Martin	Dodge Avenger	Aqua	50	Running	10	20**
3	8	5	(United States) Rusty Wallace	Dodge Avenger	Yellow	50	Running	27	19*
4	11	2	(United States) Dale Earnhardt	Dodge Avenger	Pink	50	Running	8	14***
5	3	9	(United States) Tom Kendall	Dodge Avenger	Red	50	Running		10
6	10	3	(United States) Jack Baldwin	Dodge Avenger	Powder Blue	50	Running		9
7	1	12	(Australia) Geoff Brabham	Dodge Avenger	Silver	50	Running	1	8
8	5	8	(United States) Kyle Petty	Dodge Avenger	Blue	50	Running		7
9	3	10	(United States) Danny Sullivan	Dodge Avenger	Dark Orange	50	Running		6
10	9	4	(United States) Steve Kinser	Dodge Avenger	Purple	50	Running		5
11	2	11	(United States) Scott Sharp	Dodge Avenger	Orange	19	Crash		4
12	6	7	(United States) Dale Jarrett	Dodge Avenger	Black	3	Crash		3

one *: Bonus points for leading the most laps.
two **: Bonus points for leading the 2nd most laps.
three ***: Bonus points for leading the 3rd most laps.

Average speed: 150.387 mph
Cautions: 3
Margin of victory: .35 sec
Lead changes: 7

Cautions

From Lap	To Lap	Reason
11	11	Dale Jarrett accident, turn 4
21	21	Danny Sullivan & Scott Sharp accident, turn 2
22	22	Jack Baldwin spin, turn 4

Lap Leader Breakdown

Driver	From Lap	To Lap	Number of Laps
Geoff Brabham	1	1	1
Rusty Wallace	2	26	25
Dale Earnhardt	27	27	1
Mark Martin	28	32	5
Dale Earnhardt	33	39	7
Rusty Wallace	40	41	2
Mark Martin	42	46	5
Al Unser Jr	47	50	4

== Notes ==
1. Al Unser Jr., Rusty Wallace, and Dale Earnhardt tied for second place in points. They were ordered based on their finishing position in the final race.
