= 1987 American Racing Series season =

The 1987 American Racing Series Championship consisted of 10 races. Didier Theys won three races on his way to the championship.

This was a "spec series", and all entrants used the March 86A Wildcat chassis, powered by Buick V6 engines.

== Calendar ==
Race No	Track	State	Date	Laps	Distance	Time	Speed	Winner	Pole position	Most leading laps	Fastest race lap
1	Phoenix	Arizona	April 12, 1987	75	1.6093=120.6975 km	0'41:38.23	173.928 km/h	Jeff Andretti	Didier Theys	Jeff Andretti	?
2	Milwaukee	Wisconsin	May 31, 1987	75	1.6607976=124.55982 km	0'37:43.192	198.134 km/h	Didier Theys	Didier Theys	Didier Theys	?
3	Meadowlands	New Jersey	June 28, 1987	41	2.7229356=111.6403596 km	0'46:37.80	143.650 km/h	Didier Theys	Didier Theys	Didier Theys	?
4	Cleveland	Ohio	July 5, 1987	30	3.991064=119.73192 km	0'36:57.06	194.417 km/h	Didier Theys	Didier Theys	Didier Theys	?
5	Toronto	Canada	July 19, 1987	41	2.8709912=117.7106392 km	0'45:38.760	154.726 km/h	Tommy Byrne	Tommy Byrne	Tommy Byrne	?
6	Pocono	Pennsylvania	August 16, 1987	40	4.02325=160.93 km	0'35:33.960	271.490 km/h	Tommy Byrne	Tommy Byrne	Tommy Byrne	?
7	Lexington	Ohio	September 6, 1987	21	3.86232=81.10872 km	0'30:57.910	157.161 km/h	Juan Manuel Fangio II	Tommy Byrne	Juan Manuel Fangio II	?
8	Nazareth	Pennsylvania	September 20, 1987	75	1.5223978=114.179835 km	0'39:31.310	173.342 km/h	Mike Groff	Didier Theys	Mike Groff	?
9	Monterey	California	October 11, 1987	40	3.05767=120.3068 km	0'40:23.057	181.714 km/h	Dave Simpson	Dave Simpson	Dave Simpson	?
10	Miami	Florida	November 1, 1987	22	2.8709912=63.1618064 km	0'45:59.77	82.392 km/h	Jeff Andretti	Dave Simpson	Jeff Andretti	?

== Race summaries ==
=== Phoenix race ===
Held April 12 at Phoenix International Raceway. Didier Theys won the pole.

Top Five Results

1. 1- Jeff Andretti
2. 5- Didier Theys
3. 2- Juan Manuel Fangio II
4. 20- Mike Groff
5. 4- George Metsos

=== Milwaukee race ===
Held May 31 at The Milwaukee Mile. Didier Theys won the pole.

Top Five Results

1. 5- Didier Theys
2. 7- Dave Simpson
3. 20- Mike Groff
4. 50- Tommy Byrne
5. 4- George Metsos

=== Meadowlands race ===
Held June 28 at the Meadowlands Sports Complex. Didier Theys won the pole.

Top Five Results

1. 5- Didier Theys
2. 1- Jeff Andretti
3. 11- Rich Rutherford
4. 7- Dave Simpson
5. 81- Lee Perkinson Jr.

=== Cleveland race ===
Held July 5 at Burke Lakefront Airport. Didier Theys won the pole.

Top Five Results

1. 5- Didier Theys
2. 50- Tommy Byrne
3. 71- Steve Millen
4. 1- Jeff Andretti
5. 11- Rich Rutherford

=== Toronto race ===
Held July 19 at Exhibition Place. Tommy Byrne won the pole.

Top Five Results

1. 50- Tommy Byrne
2. 20- Mike Groff
3. 71- Steve Millen
4. 23- Albert Naon Jr.
5. 81- Lee Perkinson Jr.

=== Pocono race ===
Held August 16 at Pocono Raceway. Tommy Byrne won the pole.

Top Five Results

1. 50- Tommy Byrne
2. 1- Jeff Andretti
3. 8- Mike Hooper
4. 71- Steve Millen
5. 5- Didier Theys

=== Mid-Ohio race ===
Held September 6 at The Mid-Ohio Sports Car Course. Tommy Byrne won the pole.

Top Five Results

1. 2- Juan Manuel Fangio II
2. 71- Steve Millen
3. 20- Mike Groff
4. 50- Tommy Byrne
5. 1- Jeff Andretti

=== Nazareth race ===
Held September 20 at Nazareth Speedway. Didier Theys won the pole.

Top Five Results

1. 20- Mike Groff
2. 5- Didier Theys
3. 1- Jeff Andretti
4. 23- Albert Naon Jr.
5. 11- Rich Rutherford

=== Laguna Seca race ===
Held October 11 at Mazda Raceway Laguna Seca. Dave Simpson won the pole.

Top Five Results

1. 7- Dave Simpson
2. 5- Didier Theys
3. 50- Tommy Byrne
4. 71- Steve Millen
5. 20- Mike Groff

=== Miami race ===
Held November 1 at Tamiami Park. Dave Simpson won the pole.

Top Five Results

1. 1- Jeff Andretti
2. 7- Dave Simpson
3. 2- Juan Manuel Fangio II
4. 23- Albert Naon Jr.
5. 16- George Metsos

== Final points standings ==
=== Driver ===
For every race the points were awarded: 20 points to the winner, 16 for runner-up, 14 for third place, 12 for fourth place, 10 for fifth place, 8 for sixth place, 6 seventh place, winding down to 1 points for 12th place. Additional points were awarded to the pole winner (1 point) and to the driver leading the most laps (1 point).

Place	Name	Country	Team	Total points	(United States)	(United States)	(United States)	(United States)	(Canada)	(United States)	(United States)	(United States)	(United States)	(United States)
1	Didier Theys	Belgium	Truesports	137	17	22	22	22	3	10	8	17	16	-
2	Jeff Andretti	United States	Arciero Racing	123	21	2	16	12	5	16	10	14	6	21
3	Tommy Byrne	Ireland	Opar Racing	120	3	12	6	16	22	22	13	6	14	6
4	Dave Simpson	United States	Bill Simpson Racing	101	5	16	12	5	8	8	4	4	22	17
5	Mike Groff	United States	Opar Racing	96	12	14	3	1	16	3	14	21	10	2
6	Steve Millen	New Zealand	Hemelgarn Racing	88	8	-	5	14	14	12	16	3	12	4
7	Juan Manuel Fangio II	Argentina	TEAMKAR International	57	14	6	2	-	-	-	21	-	-	14
8	Albert Naon Jr.	United States	Coors Racing	48	-	-	-	6	12	4	-	12	2	12
9	Rich Rutherford	United States	Monarch Motorsports	41	-	3	14	10
9	Rich Rutherford	United States	Agapiou Racing	41					4	-	-
9	Rich Rutherford	United States	Bill Simpson Racing	41								10	-	-
10	Lee Perkinson Jr.	United States	Hemelgarn Racing	35	-	-	10	3	10	2	5	5	-	-
11	George Metsos	Greece	Agapiou Racing	35	10	10	-	-	-	-	-	-	5	10
12	Brad Murphey	United States	TEAMKAR International	22	-	5	4	2	6	-	-	-	4	1
13	Nikolas Konstant	Greece	Agapiou Racing	17	6	8	-	-	-	-	-	-	3	-
14	Mike Hooper	United States	Opar Racing	14	-	-	-	-	-	14	-	-	-	-
15	Steve Petty	United States	Petty Racing	12	-	-	8	-	-	-	-	-	1	3
16	Matt McBride	United States	Don McBride Co.	11	-	-	-	-	-	5	6	-	-	-
17	Paul Radisich	New Zealand	Agapiou Racing	8	-	-	-	8	-	-	-	-	-	-
	Wally Dallenbach Jr.	United States	TEAMKAR International	8	-	4	-	4	-	-	-	-	-	-
	Bob Tullius	United States	TEAMKAR International	8	-	-	-	-	-	-	-	8	-	-
	Pat Phinny	United States	?	8	-	-	-	-	-	-	-	-	8	-
	Guido Daccò	Italy	Agapiou Racing	8	-	-	-	-	-	-	-	-	-	8
22	Dean Hall	United States	TEAMKAR International	6	-	-	-	-	-	6	-	-	-	-
23	Bobby Fix	United States	?	5	-	-	-	-	-	-	-	-	-	5
24	Billy Boat	United States	Machinist Union Racing	4	4	-	-	-	-	-	-	-	-	-
25	Paul Dallenbach	United States	TEAMKAR International	1	-	1	-	-	-	-	-	-	-	-
	Ron Giery	United States	?	1	-	-	-	-	-	1	-	-	-	-

Note:

Race 1, 3, 5, 7 and 8 not all points were awarded (not enough competitors).

== Complete Overview ==
first column of every race	10	= grid position

second column of every race	10	= race result

R10=retired, but classified NS=did not start

Place	Name	Country	Team	(United States)		(United States)		(United States)		(United States)		(Canada)		(United States)		(United States)		(United States)		(United States)		(United States)
1	Didier Theys	Belgium	Truesports	1	2	1	1	1	1	1	1	2	R10	2	5	2	R6	1	2	2	2	-	-
2	Jeff Andretti	United States	Arciero Racing	2	1	2	R11	5	2	8	4	4	8	5	2	5	5	3	3	9	7	4	1
3	Tommy Byrne	Ireland	Opar Racing	5	R10	4	4	2	R7	2	2	1	1	1	1	1	4	2	7	4	3	2	7
4	Dave Simpson	United States	Bill Simpson Racing	4	R8	9	2	7	4	5	8	8	6	6	6	9	R9	6	R9	1	1	1	2
5	Mike Groff	United States	Opar Racing	8	4	5	3	4	10	6	R12	3	2	8	10	6	3	5	1	7	5	5	R11
6	Steve Millen	New Zealand	Hemelgarn Racing	7	6	3	R14	6	8	3	3	6	3	3	4	4	2	4	R10	3	4	3	R9
7	Juan Manuel Fangio II	Argentina	TEAMKAR International	3	3	8	7	3	11	-	-	-	-	-	-	3	1	-	-	-	-	15	3
8	Albert Naon Jr.	United States	Coors Racing	-	-	-	-	-	-	4	7	7	4	7	9	-	-	9	4	5	R11	6	4
9	Rich Rutherford	United States	Monarch Motorsports	-	-	12	10	8	3	9	5
9	Rich Rutherford	United States	Agapiou Racing									10	9
9	Rich Rutherford	United States	Opar Racing											11	13	-	-
9	Rich Rutherford	United States	Bill Simpson Racing															7	R5	-	-	-	-
10	Lee Perkinson Jr.	United States	Hemelgarn Racing	-	-	-	-	9	5	11	10	5	5	13	11	7	R8	8	R8	8	R13	11	R14
11	George Metsos	Greece	Agapiou Racing	10	5	14	5	?	NS	-	-	-	-	-	-	-	-	-	-	11	8	12	5
12	Brad Murphey	United States	TEAMKAR International	-	-	7	8	10	9	12	11	9	7	-	-	-	-	-	-	13	9	14	R12
13	Nikolas Konstant	Greece	Agapiou Racing	11	7	13	6	?	NS	-	-	-	-	-	-	-	-	-	-	12	10	-	-
14	Mike Hooper	United States	Opar Racing	-	-	-	-	-	-	-	-	-	-	4	3	-	-	-	-	-	-	-	-
15	Steve Petty	United States	Petty Racing	-	-	-	-	11	6	-	-	-	-	-	-	-	-	-	-	10	R12	13	10
16	Matt McBride	United States	Don McBride Co.	-	-	-	-	-	-	-	-	-	-	12	8	8	R7	-	-	-	-	-	-
17	Paul Radisich	New Zealand	Agapiou Racing	-	-	-	-	-	-	7	6	-	-	-	-	-	-	-	-	-	-	-	-
	Wally Dallenbach Jr.	United States	TEAMKAR International	-	-	10	9	-	-	10	9	-	-	-	-	-	-	-	-	-	-	-	-
	Bob Tullius	United States	TEAMKAR International	-	-	-	-	-	-	-	-	-	-	-	-	-	-	10	6	-	-	-	-
	Pat Phinny	United States	?	-	-	-	-	-	-	-	-	-	-	-	-	-	-	-	-	6	6	-	-
	Guido Daccò	Italy	Agapiou Racing	-	-	-	-	-	-	-	-	-	-	-	-	-	-	-	-	-	-	10	6
22	Dean Hall	United States	TEAMKAR International	-	-	-	-	-	-	-	-	-	-	10	7	-	-	-	-	-	-	-	-
23	Bobby Fix	United States	?	-	-	-	-	-	-	-	-	-	-	-	-	-	-	-	-	-	-	8	8
24	Billy Boat	United States	Machinists Union Racing	6	R9	6	R13	-	-	-	-	-	-	-	-	-	-	-	-	-	-	-	-
25	Paul Dallenbach	United States	TEAMKAR International	-	-	11	R12	-	-	-	-	-	-	-	-	-	-	-	-	-	-	-	-
	Ron Giery	United States	?	-	-	-	-	-	-	-	-	-	-	9	12	-	-	-	-	-	-	-	-
-	Fábio Greco	Brazil	TEAMKAR International	-	-	-	-	-	-	-	-	-	-	-	-	-	-	-	-	-	-	7	R13
-	Stan Fox	United States	Petty Racing	-	-	15	R15	-	-	-	-	-	-	-	-	-	-	-	-	-	-	-	-
-	Giovanni Fontanesi	Venezuela	Agapiou Racing	-	-	-	-	-	-	-	-	-	-	-	-	-	-	-	-	-	-	9	R15
-	Gordon Johncock	United States	TEAMKAR International	9	(R8)	-	-	-	-	-	-	-	-	-	-	-	-	-	-	-	-	-	-
