= Steve Millen =

New Zealand racing driver (born 1953)

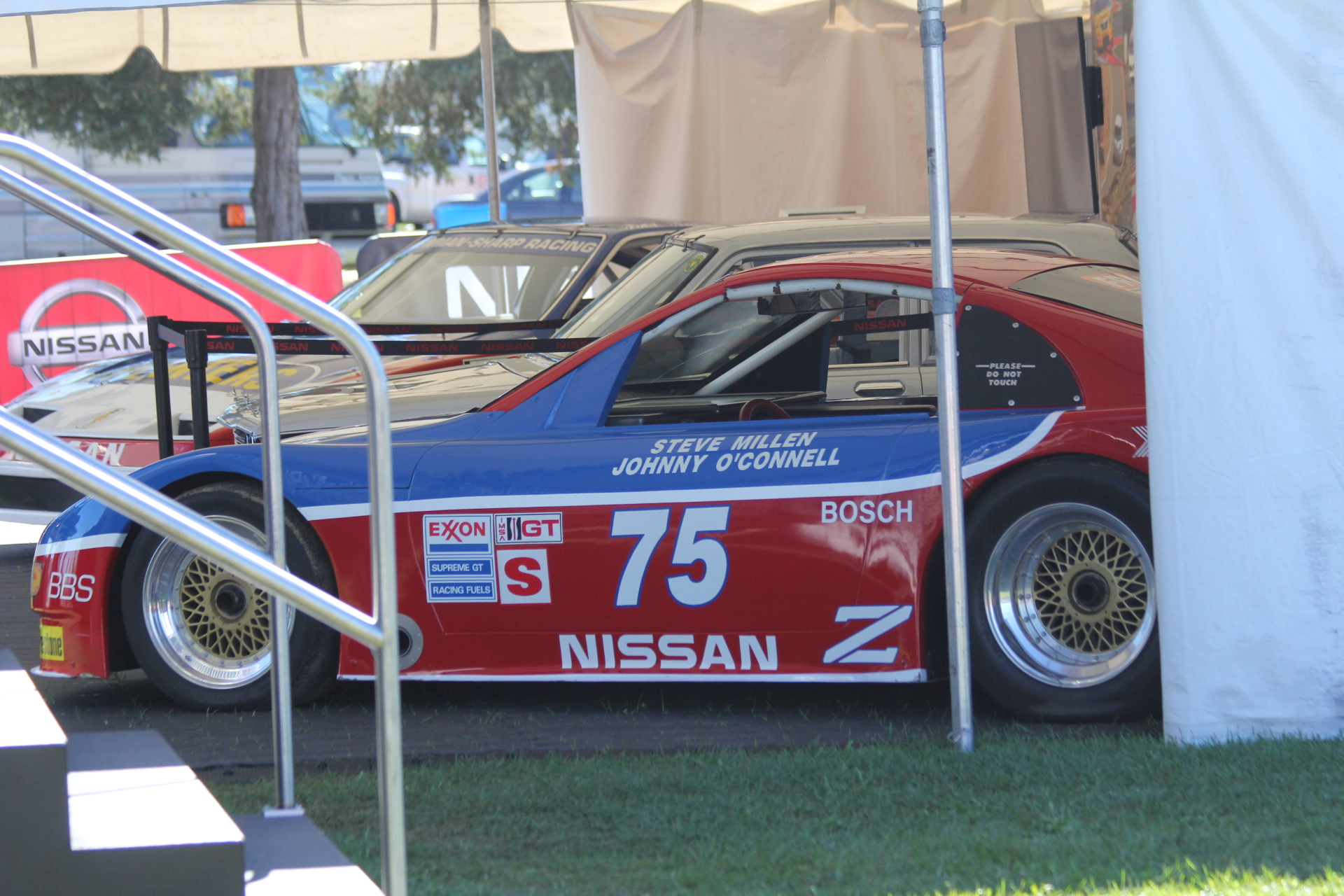
- Millen's Nissan IMSA car
- Nationality: New Zealander
- Born: Steven Clifford Millen; 17 February 1953 (age 73)
- Relatives: Rod Millen (brother); Rhys Millen (nephew); Ryan Millen (nephew)

Previous series
- 1995 1986–1987: International Race of Champions; American Racing Series

24 Hours of Le Mans career
- Years: 1990, 1994
- Best finish: 5th (1994)
- Class wins: 0

Steven Clifford Millen (born 17 February 1953) is a retired New Zealand IMSA race car driver. In the 1970s and 1980s, Millen raced in hillclimbing and Formula Ford before doing stadium off-road racing in the United States in the Mickey Thompson Entertainment Group (MTEG). He then began sports car racing, winning numerous championships in IMSA Camel GT. Millen won 20 races in the series, including the 24 Hours of Daytona and the 12 Hours of Sebring.

== Racing career ==
Millen began his racing career in hillclimbing in 1969. He then moved to the Formula Ford series. He started competing in rally cars in the mid 1970s. He switched to off-road racing in the Mickey Thompson Entertainment Group (MTEG) stadium series in the early 1980s. He won the 1986, 1988, and 1989 Mickey Thompson Off-Road Grand Prix Grand National Sports Truck Championships. He also won two Indy Lights races in the series' inaugural 1986 season. That same year, he also participated in the last round of the World Rally Championship in the 21st Olympus Rally driving for Toyota Team Europe, accompanying the Swedish drivers Björn Waldegård and Lars-Erik Torph.

Millen switched to the IMSA Camel GT series in 1990. He was the 1990 24 Hours of Le Mans Rookie of the Year. He won three races and took five pole positions in 1990. He had seven poles and five wins in 1991. He also drove for Allan Moffat Racing in the 1991 Tooheys 1000 at Bathurst, partnering Gary Brabham in a Ford Sierra RS500 but the car did not finish the race. Millen expressed interest in returning but no offer was forthcoming with the Moffat team seeing the return of the car's builder Ruedi Eggenberger in 1992 along with his ace driver Klaus Niedzwiedz.

Millen won the 1992 IMSA GTS championship in a Nissan 300ZX Twin Turbo car. He won the 12 Hours of Sebring and had top five finishes in the first four events before his 1993 season ended with injuries at Watkins Glen International.

Millen returned in 1994 and won the IMSA GTS championship. He won the 1994 24 Hours of Daytona and 12 Hours of Sebring and was first in class at the 24 Hours of Le Mans.

In 1995, Millen won the 12 Hours of Sebring. He was invited to the International Race of Champions (IROC). He was leading the IMSA GTS championship, when he had a professional career-ending crash at Road Atlanta. He had competed in three of four IROC races.

Millen has the most all-time wins in IMSA GTS history with 20 victories. His 23 pole positions are also a series record.

Millen has had several wins in occasional appearances in various series since his retirement.

Millen also worked as a driver for commercials sometimes with Rod and has appeared in a commercial for Honda, despite being under contract at the time to rival Nissan. He is also a member of the Screen Actors Guild as a stunt driver, which provided the healthcare he needed when he had his career ending crash.

== Stillen ==
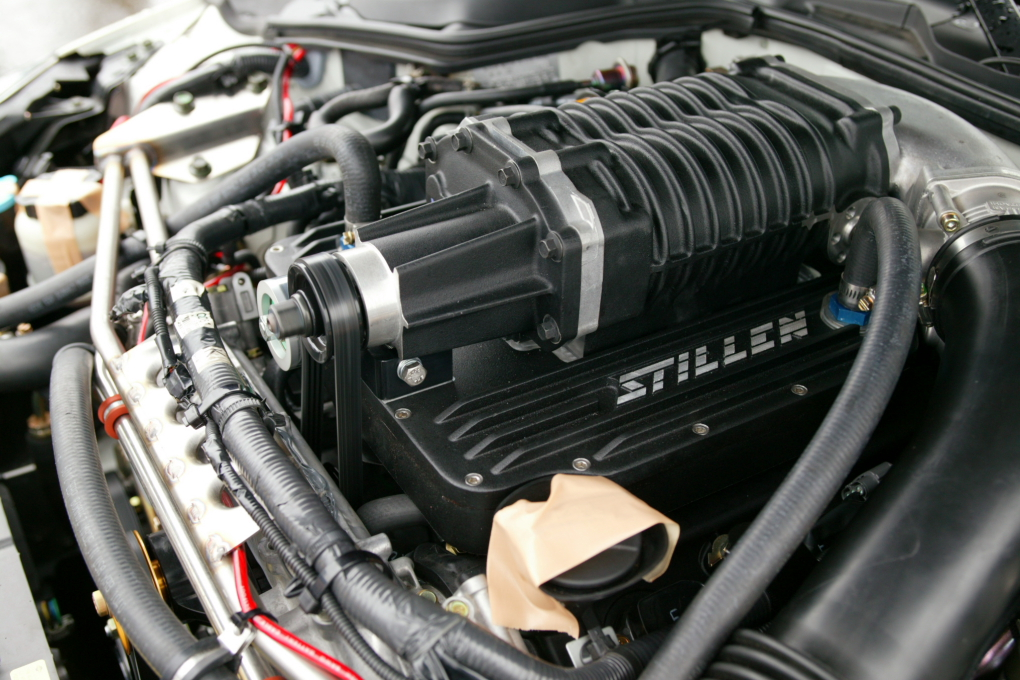
Supercharger (Eaton MP62) kit for 350Z

Millen started Stillen (stylized as STILLEN) (Steve Millen Sportparts, Inc.), an aftermarket performance parts company specializing in Nissan and other performance vehicles in 1986. Stillen began by selling mini-truck ground effects and then began fulfilling orders for vans and full-sized trucks. However, Stillen became known for specializing in parts for Nissan cars, but also supplies parts for other vehicles such as the Ford GT and Toyota 86. Stillen also develops parts for other cars such as the Chevrolet Camaro and Ford F150 (including Ford Raptor). In 1996, Stillen purchased a machining shop from Frank Shuter, a former New Zealand speedway champion.

During the 1990s, Millen offered a line of customized high performance Chevrolet Suburban SUVs, and several modified Nissan special edition vehicles.

Millen has also been active in designing and engineering race cars for hill climbing, notably the Pikes Peak and Race to the Sky hillclimb in Queenstown, New Zealand.

The company became quite popular with the production of its Stillen exhaust and has continued expanding their line of performance parts. Today, they offer a line of superchargers, cold air intakes, and body kits for sports cars, American performance cars and trucks.

The Stillen R35 GT-R, involved modifying a Nissan GT-R, enabling it to go from 0–100 km/h in 2.9 seconds, instead of the factory-rated 3.6 seconds. The car was designed mainly for Targa Newfoundland. The modifications included removal of significant weight, chip and computer tuning, new stiffer suspension system and carbon brakes.

== Racing family ==
Millen's brother Rod became a legend at the Pikes Peak International Hillclimb. Steve is the uncle of Rhys and Ryan who both compete in motorsport events.

== Motorsports career results ==
=== International Race of Champions ===
(key) (Bold - Pole position. * – Most laps led.)

International Race of Champions results
Year	Make	1	2	3	4	Pos.	Points	Ref
1995	Dodge	DAY; 9	DAR; 9	TAL; 10	MCH	12th	20	

=== 24 Hours of Le Mans results ===
Year	Team	Co-drivers	Car	Class	Laps	Pos.	Class pos.
1990	(United States) Nissan Performance Technology Inc.	(United States) Bob Earl (Republic of Ireland) Michael Roe	Nissan R90CK	C1	311	17th	17th
1994	(United States) Cunningham Racing	(United States) John Morton (United States) Johnny O'Connell	Nissan 300ZX Turbo	IMSA; GTS	317	5th	**1st**

=== Bathurst 1000 results ===
Year	Team	Car	Co-driver	Class	Position	Laps
1991	Allan Moffat Enterprises	Ford Sierra RS500	(Australia) Gary Brabham	Div. 1	DNF	128

== See also ==
- Stillen
- Rod Millen
- Rhys Millen
- Nissan

Sporting positions
Preceded by Teo Fabi	Winner of the New Zealand Grand Prix; 1980	Succeeded by David McMillan
