= Dodge Avenger =

Mid-sized car models by Dodge (1995–2014)

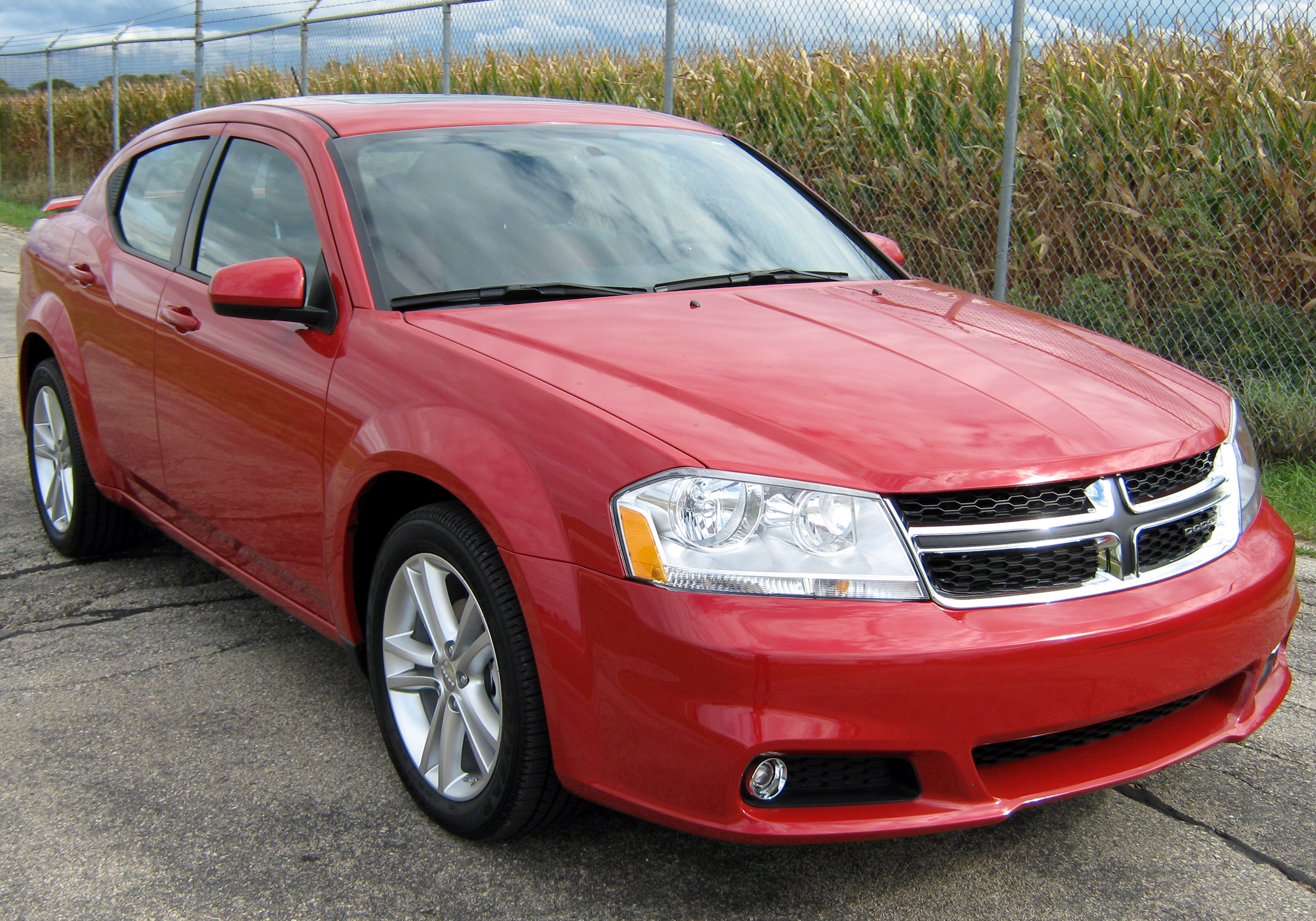
- 2012 Dodge Avenger sedan

Overview
- Manufacturer: Dodge (Note: Mitsubishi Motors (1994–2000); DaimlerChrysler (2007); Chrysler LLC (2007–2009); Chrysler Group LLC (2009–2014); FCA US LLC (2014))
- Production: 1994–2000; 2007–2014
- Model years: 1995–2000; 2008–2014

Body and chassis
- Class: Sport compact (1994–2000); Mid-size car (2007–2014)

Chronology
- Predecessor: Dodge Daytona
- Successor: Chrysler 200; Dodge Dart

The Dodge Avenger is a front-wheel drive, mid-sized sedan that was marketed by Dodge. The Avenger made its North American debut in 1994 for the 1995 model year as a coupe that was produced until 2000. The model name was reintroduced to the market as a four-door sedan in 2007 for the 2008 model year. The Dodge Avenger name was used on the South African market Hillman Avengers in 1975 and 1976.

The 2014 model year marked the end of Avenger production as the mid-sized models for both the Dodge and Chrysler brands were consolidated into the new Chrysler 200 introduced for the 2015 model year while Dodge received the new compact Dart.

== Nameplate history ==
The first use of the Dodge Avenger name was on a badge-engineered version of the European Hillman Avenger, exclusive to South Africa. The same car was sold in North America as the Plymouth Cricket between 1972 and 1974. In place of the Hillman engines, this version used a Peugeot 1.6 L engine (as also installed in locally assembled Peugeot 404s) to satisfy local content requirements. The Dodge-branded Avenger was introduced in 1975 and was then renamed Chrysler in 1976. This generation has nothing in common with later Dodge Avengers. After Chrysler ZA was merged into Sigma in 1976, the Avenger was soon canceled to allow Sigma to free up more production capacity for the Mazda 323.

The Avenger nameplate returned as a 2023 subcompact Jeep model available as a plug-in hybrid version or an all-electric drivetrain.

== Dodge Avenger Coupe (1995–2000) ==
Dodge Avenger Coupe
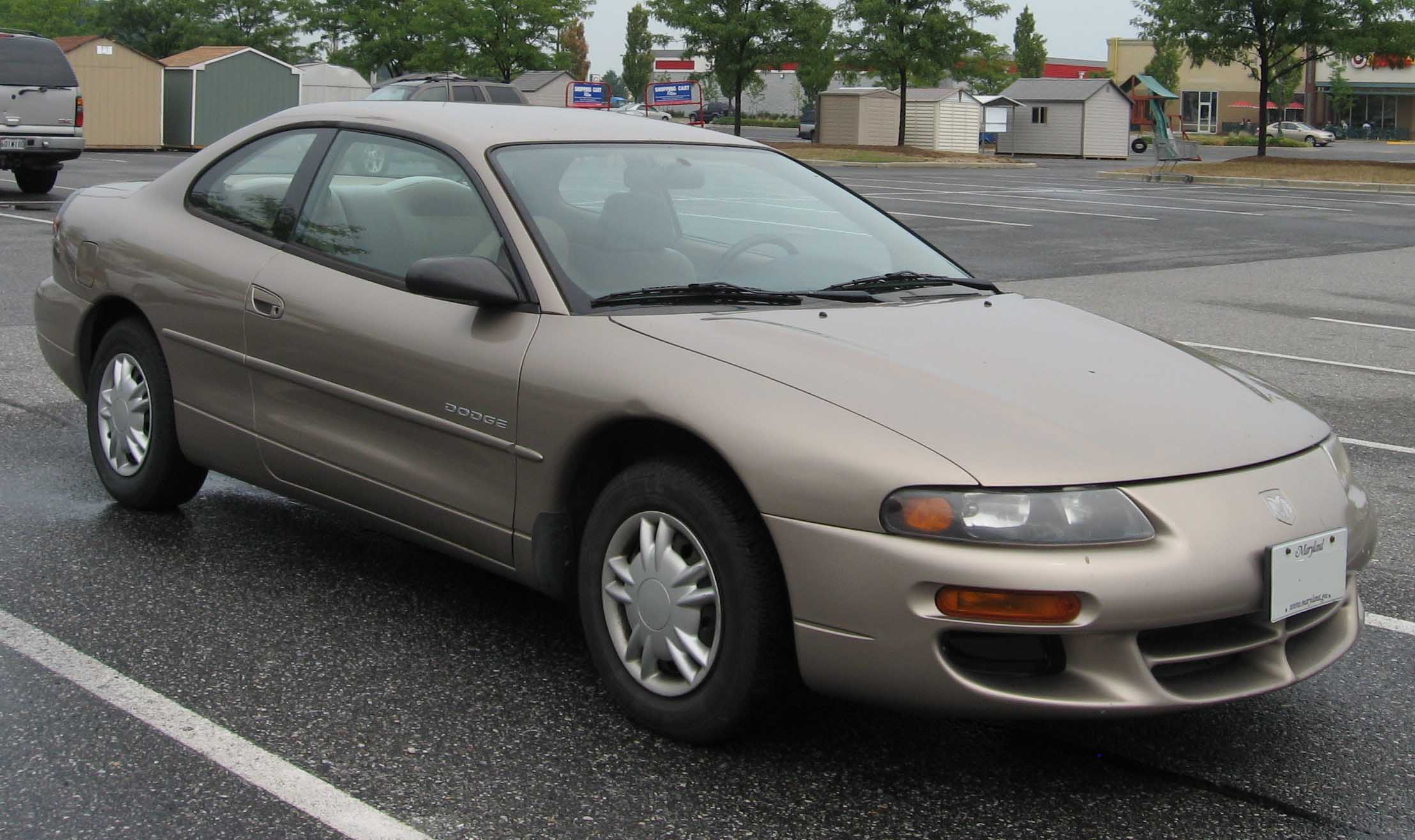

Overview
- Also called: Chrysler Sebring coupe
- Production: 1994–2000
- Model years: 1995–2000
- Assembly: United States: Normal, Illinois (DSM)
- Designer: Daniel Sims (1991)

Body and chassis
- Class: Sport compact
- Body style: 2-door coupe
- Layout: Transverse front-engine, front-wheel drive
- Platform: Chrysler FJ platform
- Related: Eagle Talon; Mitsubishi Eclipse

Powertrain
- Engine: Gasoline: 2.0 L Chrysler 420A I4; 2.5 L Mitsubishi 6G73 V6
- Transmission: 5-speed manual 4-speed Chrysler Ultradrive 41TE automatic

Dimensions
- Wheelbase: 103.7 in (2,634 mm)
- Length: 190.2 in (4,831 mm) (1998–2000); 187.2 in (4,755 mm) (1994–97)
- Width: 69.1 in (1,755 mm) (1998–2000); 68.5 in (1,740 mm) (1994–97)
- Height: 53.0 in (1,346 mm) (1998–2000); 51 in (1,295 mm) (1994–97)

Chronology
- Predecessor: Dodge Stealth, Dodge Daytona
- Successor: Dodge Stratus coupe

Introduced as a two-door coupe in North America, the Dodge Avenger was built from 1994 until 2000 in a similar size and price class as the Dodge Daytona, which was discontinued in February 1993.

The Avenger, along with the similar Chrysler Sebring coupe, was built by Diamond Star Motors (DSM), a joint venture between Chrysler Corporation and Mitsubishi Motors, on a version of the Mitsubishi Galant platform (which also spawned the similar Mitsubishi Eclipse). Chrysler sold its equity stake to Mitsubishi in 1993. Diamond-Star Motors was renamed Mitsubishi Motors Manufacturing America (MMMA) on July 1, 1995. Avengers and Sebring coupes built from 1994 until 1996 have DSM identification in their engine compartments.

The Avenger was built on a 103.7 in (2,634 mm) wheelbase and used either a 2.0 L inline-four engine (the Chrysler 420A) or a Mitsubishi-designed 2.5 L V6. The four-cylinder was coupled to a five-speed manual transmission, shared with the Mitsubishi Eclipse and Eagle Talon, or a four-speed automatic. The V6 engine was only available with the A604 automatic transmission. The Avengers featured a fully independent double wishbone suspension and variable-speed rack-and-pinion steering.

Trims included the Highline base model (the V6 engine, among other options, were made standard in 2000) and the ES.

=== Model year changes ===
==== 1995 ====
A DOHC 16-valve 2.0 L I4 engine (140 hp (104 kW; 142 PS) and 130 lb⋅ft (176 N⋅m) of torque) is standard. A SOHC 24-valve 2.5 L V6 engine and an automatic transmission (155 hp (116 kW; 157 PS) and 160 lb⋅ft (217 N⋅m) of torque) are optional on the ES. Fog lamps and ABS are optional on the ES.

==== 1996 ====
- Power and torque ratings for the V6 are increased (163 horsepower, 170 lb⋅ft (230 N⋅m) torque), and the ES coupes had new seat fabric
- OBD-II is standard
- New colors
- A universal garage door opener was added as an option

==== 1997 ====
Standard were 16-inch wheels, and the license plate was moved from the decklid to the rear bumper. The front and rear fasciae were redesigned. A Sport model was introduced (in addition to the base and ES). The Avenger Sport package consisted of exclusive 16-inch aluminum wheels and a body-color spoiler. This appearance package was available on the base model.

A body-color rear spoiler, P215/50HR17 tires, and 17-inch cast-aluminum wheels were added for the ES. The V6 is also standard for the ES, and rear disc brakes.

==== 1998 ====
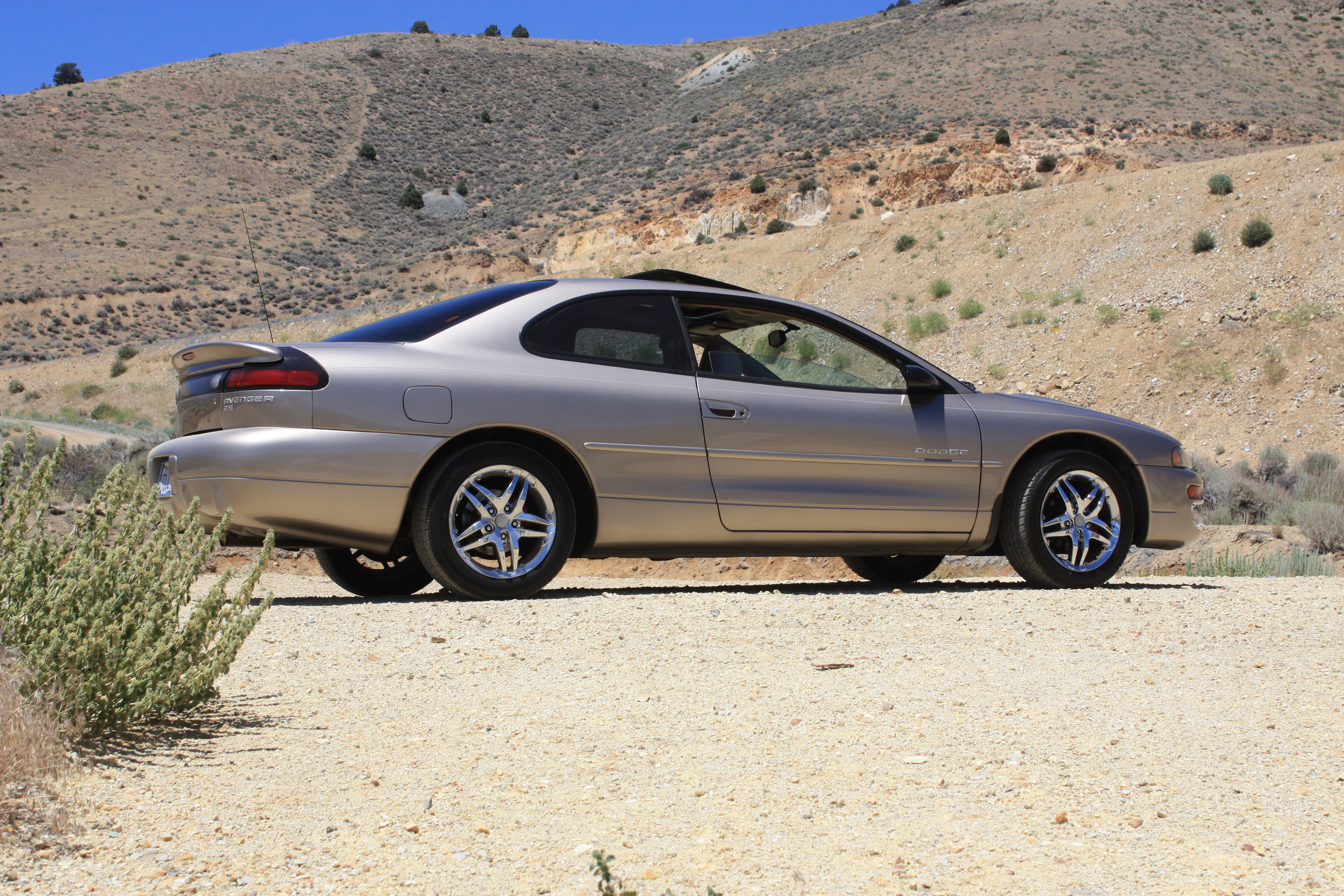
1998 Dodge Avenger coupe

An onboard recycling vapor recovery system, Cafe Latte exterior color, and a black and gray interior color combination are added.

==== 1999 ====
Next-generation driver and front passenger airbags are added, as well as a new exterior color: Shark Blue. The V6 engine and automatic transmission are standard on all models in mid-year, as well as several options. An anti-lock braking system (ABS) was used in all ES models until 1999.

==== 2000 ====
For the 2000 model year, the V6 and automatic transmission combination were standard on all Avengers, and ABS was an "option" for ES models. The four-cylinder engine was no longer available. Standard features that had previously been optional included power windows and locks. Base models added cruise control and four-wheel disc brakes. The ES coupes became with standard leather upholstery, keyless remote entry, and a power driver's seat.

=== Replacement ===
The coupe did not achieve high sales numbers, so in 2000, the Avenger was discontinued. It was replaced by the Dodge Stratus coupe for the 2001 model year. This coupe utilized the third-generation Eclipse platform and architecture. Mitsubishi assembled it at the former Diamond Star plant. However, the Stratus sedan was engineered and built by Chrysler.

== Dodge Avenger sedan (2008–2014) ==
Dodge Avenger sedan
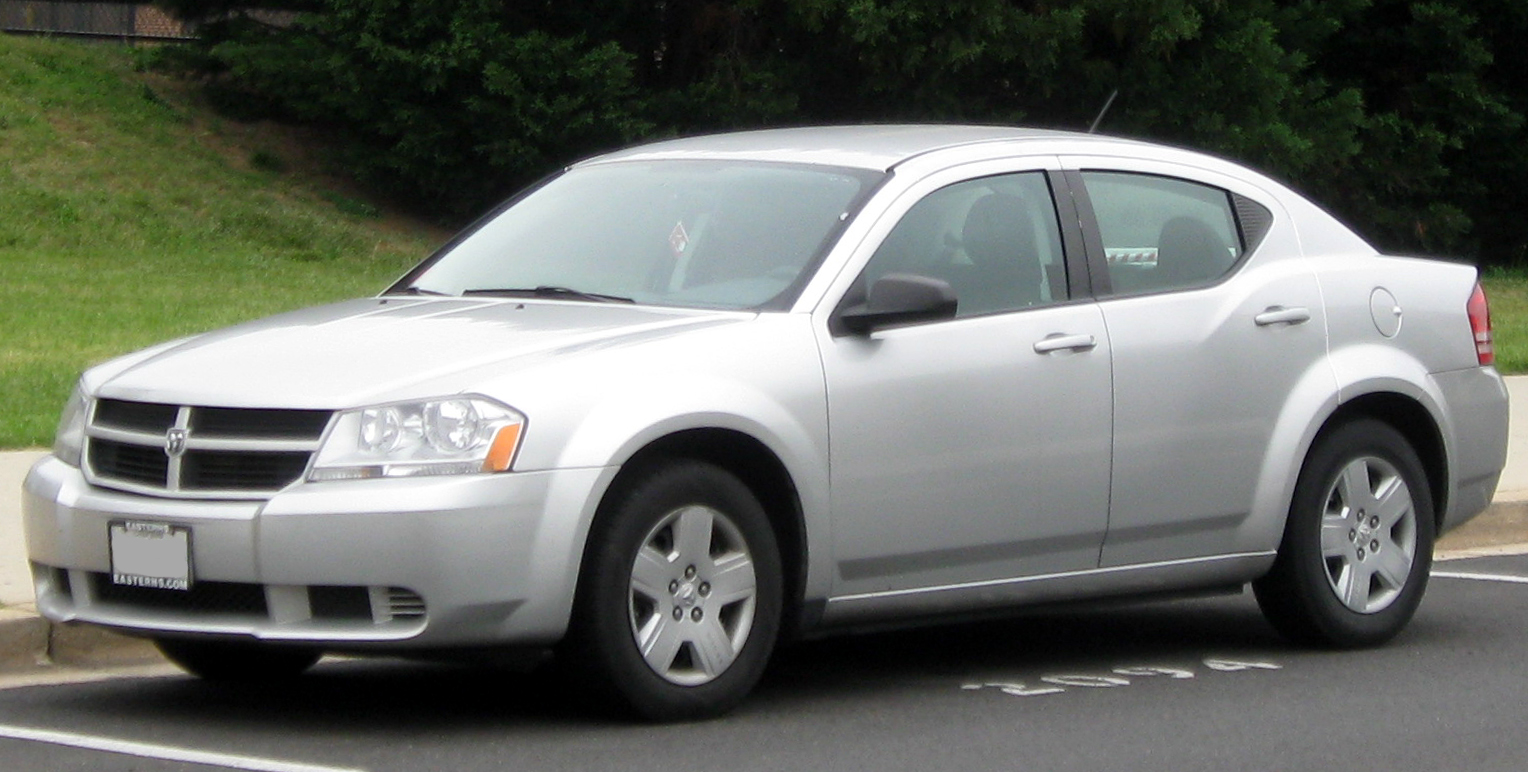
- Pre-facelift

Overview
- Also called: Dodge GTS (Mexico)
- Production: February 2007– 2014
- Model years: 2008–2014
- Assembly: United States: Sterling Heights, Michigan (Sterling Heights Assembly)
- Designer: Ryan Nagode (2004)

Body and chassis
- Class: Mid-size car
- Body style: 4-door fastback sedan
- Layout: Transverse front-engine, front-wheel drive / all-wheel drive
- Platform: Chrysler JS platform
- Related: Chrysler 200; Chrysler Sebring; Dodge Journey

Powertrain
- Engine: Gasoline: 2.0 L GEMA World I4; 2.4 L GEMA World I4; 2.7 L Chrysler EER V6; 3.5 L Chrysler EGF V6; 3.6 L Chrysler Pentastar V6; Diesel: 2.0 L VW BKD CRD PD turbo I4
- Transmission: 4-speed Ultradrive 40TES automatic; 4-speed Ultradrive41TES automatic; 5-speed Magna T-355 manual; 6-speed Ultradrive 62TE automatic; 6-speed Getrag Mps6 DCT automatic; 6-speed Aisin manual

Dimensions
- Wheelbase: 108.9 in (2,766 mm)
- Length: 190.9 in (4,849 mm)
- Width: 71.8 in (1,824 mm)
- Height: 58.9 in (1,496 mm)

Chronology
- Predecessor: Dodge Stratus
- Successor: Chrysler 200; Dodge Dart

The Dodge Avenger nameplate returned in February 2007 as a 2008 model year sedan to replace the Dodge Stratus, whose coupe version had replaced the original Avenger in 2001.

Like its Dodge Journey stablemate, the Avenger's exterior was styled by Chrysler's Ryan Nagode. Ben S. Chang designed the interior.

The Avenger was officially unveiled as a concept car at the Paris Motor Show on 28 September 2006. It was launched in Europe and marketed in the United Kingdom, filling a gap in the Chrysler range left by the Neon's discontinuation four years earlier. It was also launched in Australia with only the 2.4 L engine. The Avenger was discontinued in that market in 2010 due to slow sales. The 2007 through 2014 models were sold in New Zealand.

According to some reports, the Avenger and the redesigned Chrysler Sebring share a DaimlerChrysler/Mitsubishi Motors platform called JS, which used the Mitsubishi GS as a starting point. The SE and SXT trim levels' base engine was the 2.4 L GEMA I4 naturally aspirated "World Engine", a joint venture between DaimlerChrysler, Mitsubishi, and Hyundai. Additional engines included an optional 2.7 L V6 in the SXT and a standard 3.5 L V6 in the R/T trim level. In addition to the 2.4 L World Engine and the V6s, export vehicles were offered with the 2.0 L naturally aspirated World Engine, as well as a 2.0 L turbocharged diesel (Pumpe-Düse) made by Volkswagen.

=== 2008 ===
Although a 2008 model, the Dodge Avenger became available in February 2007. In the U.S. market, the Avenger was launched with a 30-second television advertisement, "Tuned Up", that debuted on 4 March 2007, during NHL hockey, an ad in which a lab technician discovers he can play "Smoke on the Water" by Deep Purple on the Avenger's transmission. Another television spot likened the Avenger to the "superhero" vehicle for the everyman, depicting a driver piloting his Avenger through Gotham-like streets and alleys, speaking to the MyGig entertainment system in distinctly Batman-reminiscent tones, to arrive home, pull into a two-car garage, and open the rear door to a sleeping child in the rear car seat.

Features on the new Avenger included optional heated/cooled cup holders and Dodge's new "Chill Zone", a feature that comes standard on all Avenger models, which can store up to four 12-US-fl oz cans in the glove box and chill them to 40 °F.

The Avenger competed directly with the Chevrolet Malibu and Ford Fusion, with the 2007 and later Chrysler Sebring being aimed at the higher-priced American cars such as the Mercury Milan, Pontiac G6, and Saturn Aura.

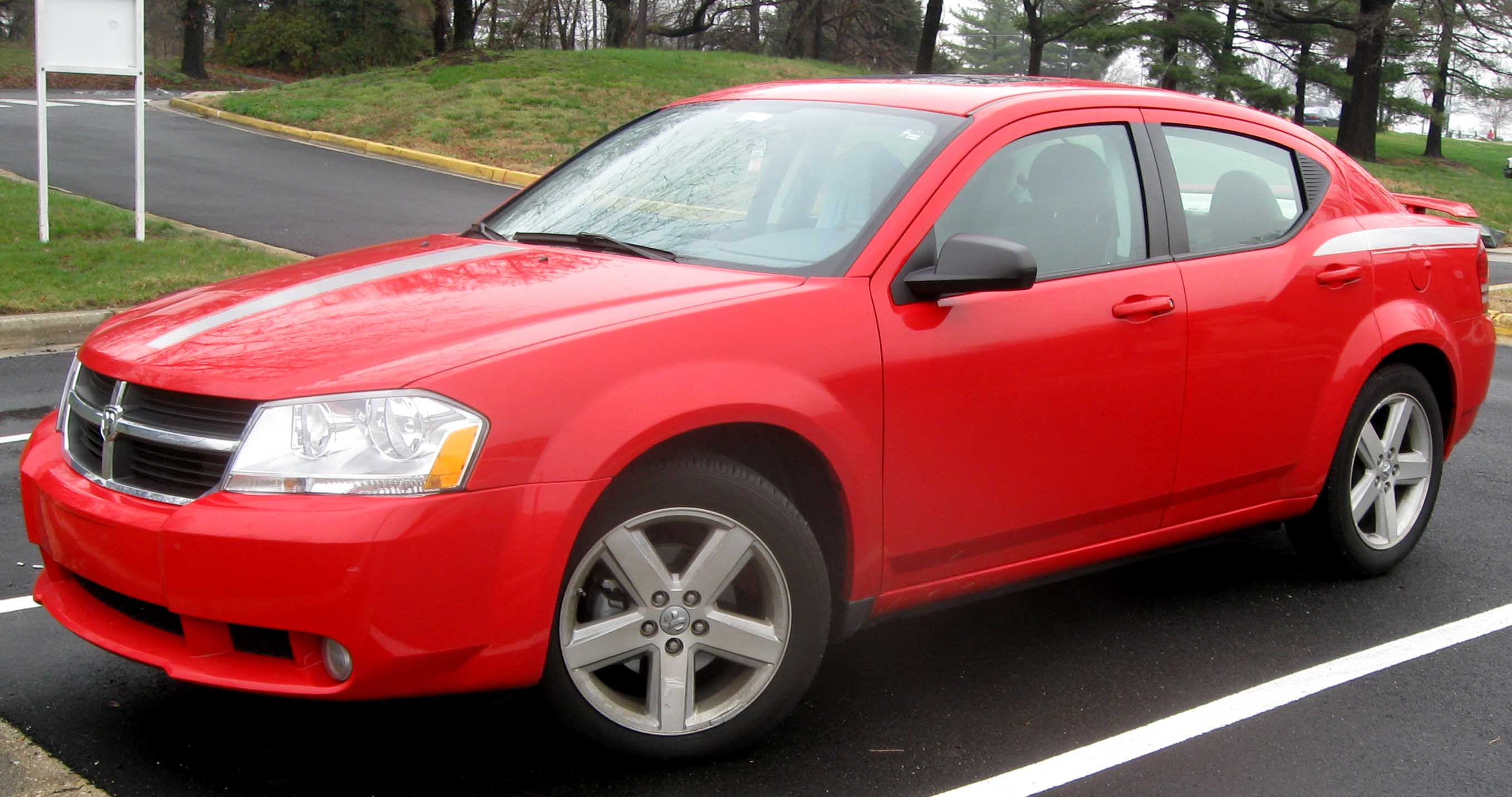
2008-2009 Dodge Avenger SXT

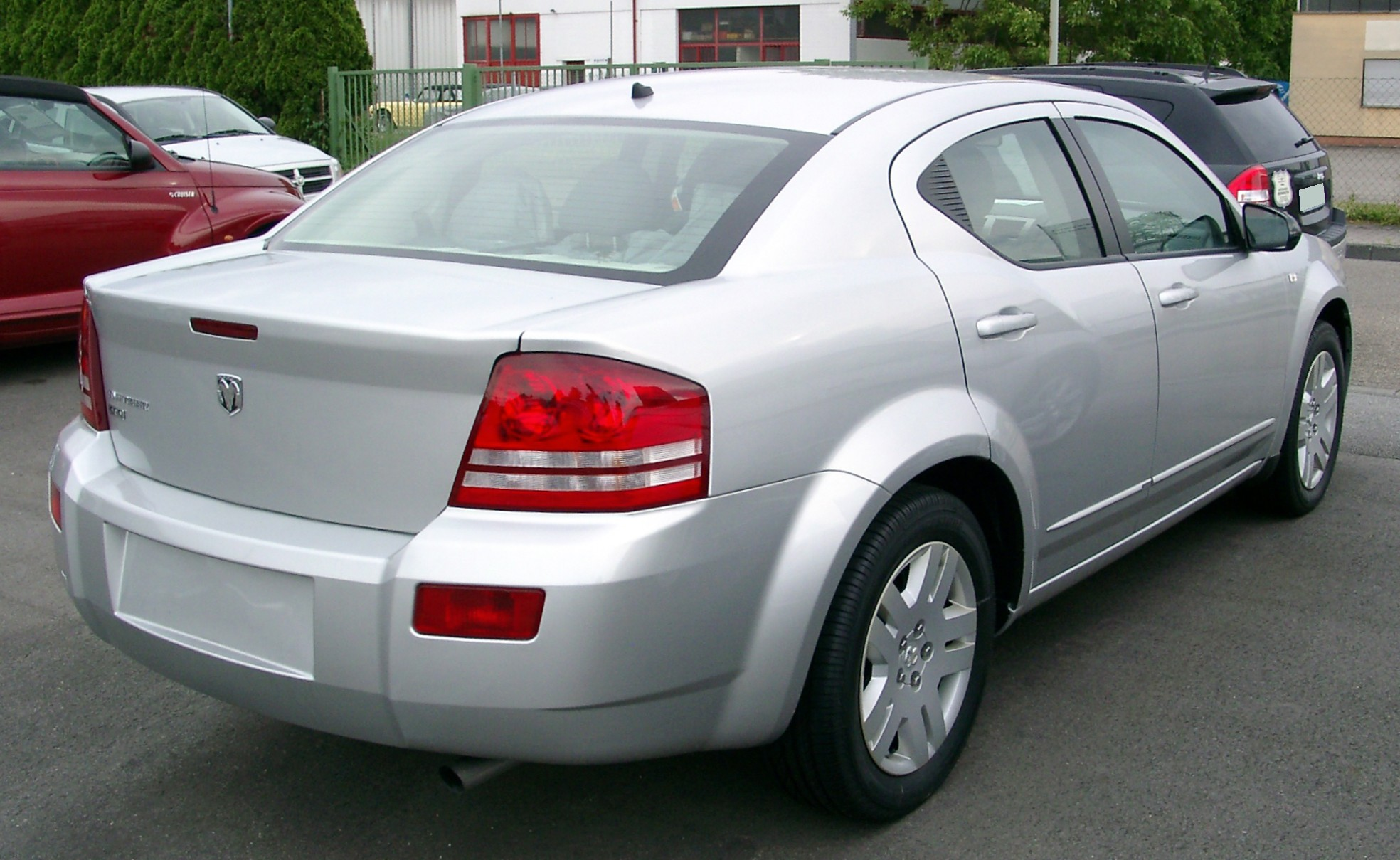
Dodge Avenger rear view

=== 2009 ===
For the 2009 model year, like its Caliber, Charger, Grand Caravan, Journey, and Nitro models, the "AVENGER" badge at the trunk lid's left was repositioned to the right side to make way for "DODGE" at the left.

Following Fiat's takeover of Chrysler Group, marketing of the Avenger was discontinued in the United Kingdom. Sales of the Avenger continued in the Republic of Ireland and Western Europe until late 2009, following Fiat's takeover of Chrysler Group. This version continued with SE and SXT trim levels but was not badged the same way as North American or South American versions.

=== 2010 ===
Under the influence of Fiat, the 2010 model year Avenger sedan had few changes. New were front side and head-curtain airbags as well as head-impact protection in the front seats. The optional all-wheel drive was discontinued, limiting the Avenger to only front-wheel drive. The 2.7 L V6 was dropped, leaving two different drivetrains: a 2.4 L (173 hp (129 kW; 175 PS) I4 with four-speed automatic transmission (the SXT model) or a 3.5 L (235 hp (175 kW; 238 PS) V6 with AutoStick six-speed (available on the R/T). The Avenger featured a soft ride while the R/T versions included a firmer suspension, front and rear stabilizer bars, and 18-inch wheels.

=== 2011 ===
For the 2011 model year, the Avenger received its first significant overhaul since its 2008 reintroduction. Exterior changes include slightly revised sheet metal with a new crosshair grille displaying the new Dodge logo on the lower right corner of the grille, a sleeker bumper cut design, and standard LED combination taillights. Changes to the interior are more noticeable with a completely redesigned dashboard and instrument panel featuring an available 6.5-inch navigation/media center screen. Higher-quality soft-touch plastics for dashboard, door, and trim panels replaced the old materials, which were criticized for their poor fit and finish quality, as well as being unpleasant to the touch. The seats receive better cushioning and higher-grade upholstery. Two-tone interior color combinations were available.

Mechanically, the 2011 Avenger came standard with the existing 173 hp (129 kW) 2.4 L GEMA I4. However, it became paired with a six-speed automatic or the option of having the previous four-speed. Also available was the new 3.6 L Pentastar V6, rated at 283 hp (211 kW) and 260 lb⋅ft (350 N⋅m) of torque. The suspension was revised to improve handling and ride quality. Trim level designations were replaced by Express, Mainstreet, Lux, and Heat models.

The Dodge Avenger was ranked the "Most American Made" sedan by the American University's Kogod School of Business 2013 Made in America Auto Index. The Dodge Avenger also has an overall rating of 6.7.

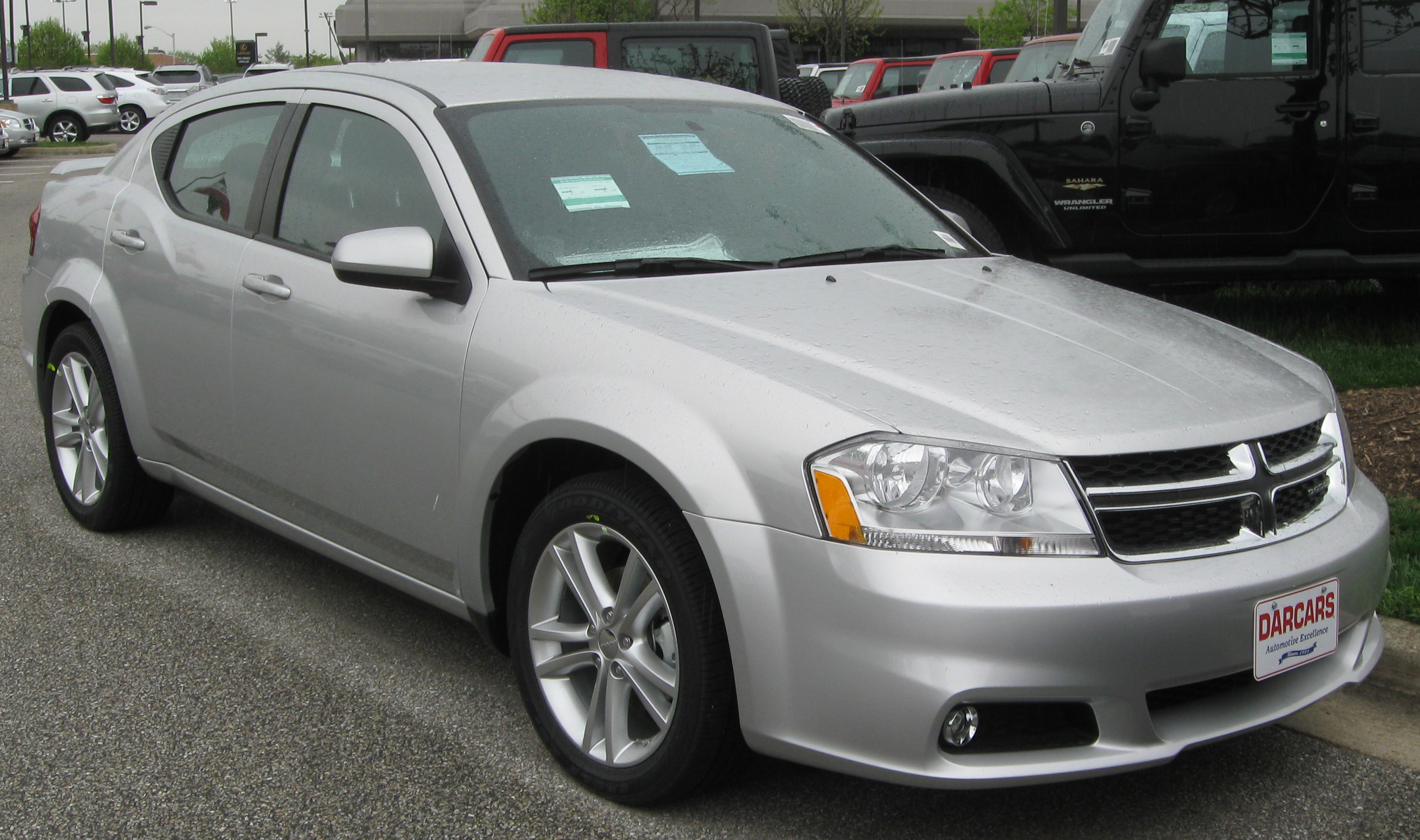
2011 Dodge Avenger Heat

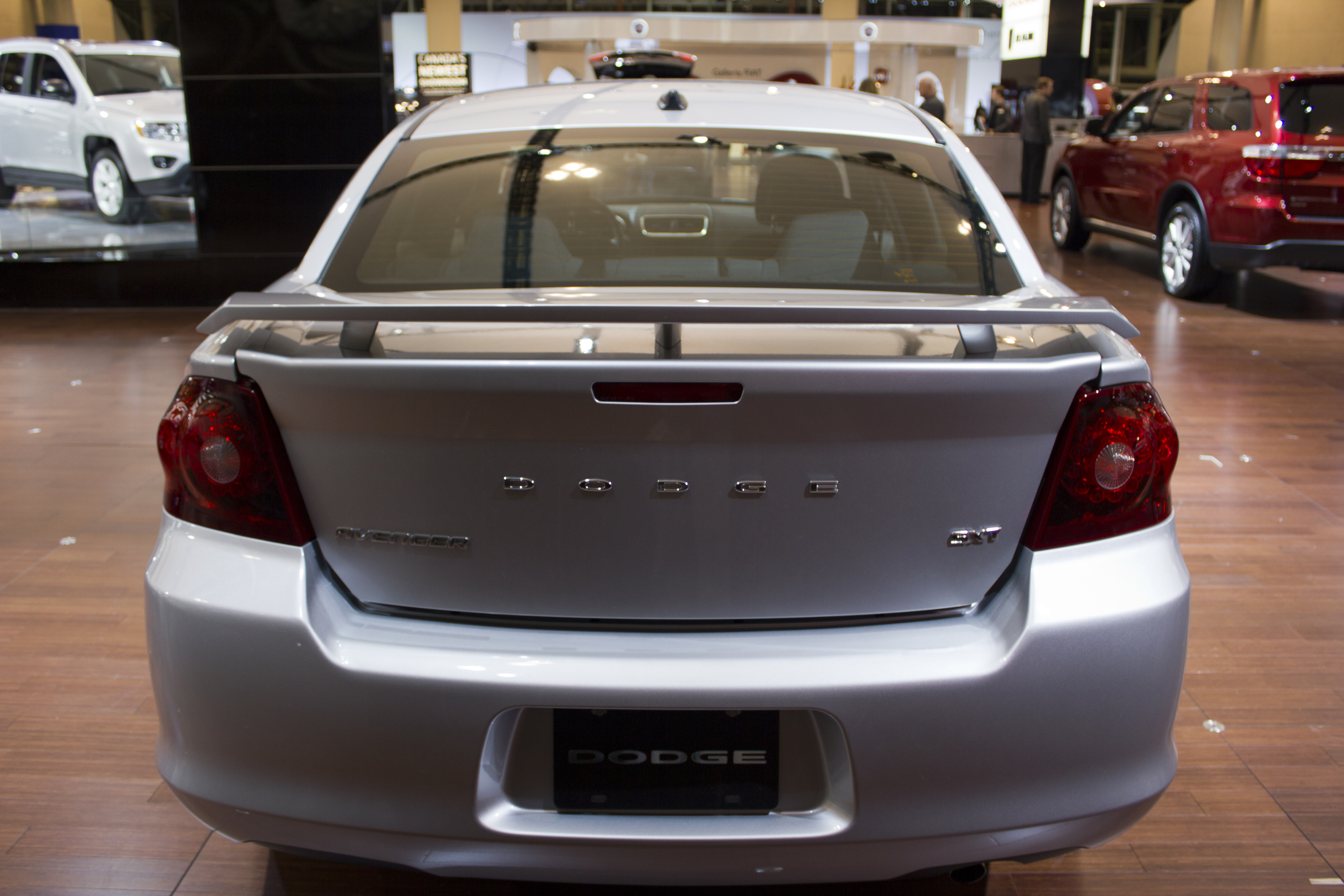
Avenger SXT rear view, 2011-2014 model

=== Trims ===
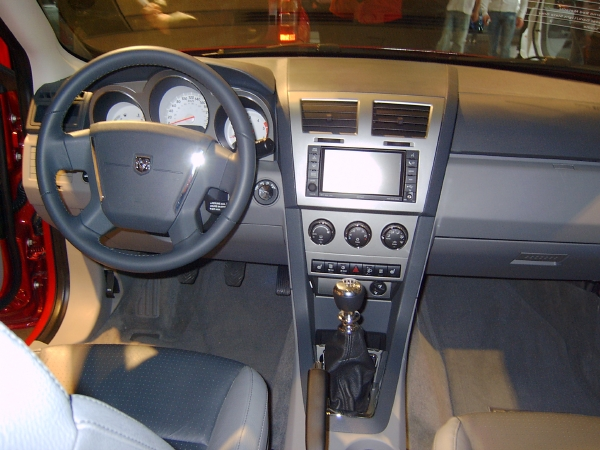
2008–2010 model dashboard

- SE: (2007–2009, 2012–2014) The "base" trim level from 2007 to 2009, and then again from 2012 to 2014.
  - 2.0 L VW TDI PD I4 DOHC 16V CRD 6-speed manual
  - 2.4 L GEMA I4 DOHC 16V Dual VVT 4-speed automatic
- SXT: (2007–2010, 2012–2014) The "volume" trim level from 2007 to 2010, and again from 2012 to 2014.
  - 2.0 L VW TDI PD I4 DOHC 16V CRD 6-speed manual
  - 2.4 L GEMA I4 DOHC 16V Dual VVT 4-speed automatic
  - 2.7 L EER V6 DOHC 24-valve MPI 4-speed automatic
  - 2.4 L GEMA I4 DOHC 16V Dual VVT 6-speed automatic
  - 3.6 L Pentastar V6 DOHC 24V MPI 6-speed automatic
- SXT Plus: (2012) One of the more "uplevel" trim levels in 2012. Discontinued after 2012.
  - 3.6 L Pentastar V6 DOHC 24V MPI 6-speed automatic
- R/T: (2007–2010, 2012–2014) At first the "top-of-the-line" trim level from 2007 to 2010, and then the "performance-oriented" trim level from 2012 to 2014.
  - 3.5 L EGF V6 24V MPI 6-speed automatic
  - 3.6 L Pentastar V6 DOHC 24V MPI 6-speed automatic
- R/T AWD: (2007–2009)
  - 3.5 L EGF High Output V6 24V MPI 6-speed automatic
- Express: (2010-2011) Replaces SE as basic trim level from 2010 to 2011. Discontinued after 2011.
  - 2.4 L GEMA I4 DOHC 16V MPI 4-speed automatic
- Mainstreet: (2011) Replaces SXT as one of the more "basic" trim levels in 2011, discontinued after 2011.
  - 2.4 L GEMA I4 DOHC 16V MPI 6-speed automatic
- Lux: (2011) Replaces SXT Plus as one of the "uplevel" trims in 2011, discontinued after 2011.
  - 2.4 L GEMA I4 DOHC 16V MPI 6-speed automatic
  - 3.6 L Pentastar V6 DOHC 24V MPI 6-speed automatic
- Heat: (2011) Replaces SXT Plus as one of the "uplevel" trim levels in 2011, discontinued after 2011.
  - 3.6 L Pentastar V6 DOHC 24V MPI 6-speed automatic

== Total sales ==
Year	U.S.	Canada	Mexico	Europe
2007	83,804	7,067	8,091	884
2008	61,963	7,873	8,525	2,990
2009	38,922	5,533	3,592	1,212
2010	50,923	3,495	3,690	423
2011	64,023	4,680	4,147	
2012	96,890	4,858	3,748	
2013	93,842	7,631	3,119	
2014	51,705	488	631	
2015	1,268	8	35	
2016	45			
2019	1			
Subtotal	543,385	41,633	35,578	5,509
Sales Total: 626,105 (excludes Australia)

=== Safety ===
The 2008 through 2014 Avenger, also sold as the Chrysler Sebring from 2008 until 2010, and the Chrysler 200 from 2011 through 2014, received an overall "Good" rating by the IIHS, indicating no significant injuries. The car received an overall "Acceptable" rating in the small overlap test due to marginal dummy kinematics and slight intrusion into the passenger compartment. In the side test, the Avenger earned a "Good" rating; however, rib fractures were possible for the driver. In the roof strength evaluation, it gained a "Good" rating, as well as for its head restraints and seats.

The Avenger earned the "Top Safety Pick" award in 2009, 2010, 2011, 2012, and 2014 as well as earned the "Top Safety Pick+" award in 2013.

=== Discontinuation ===
The discontinuation of the Dodge Avenger was announced by the automaker in early 2014, along with the end of the Chrysler 200 convertible model. The final 2014 model year Avengers were produced during the first quarter of 2014.

The Avenger nameplate has since been revived as the Jeep Avenger.

== Motorsport ==
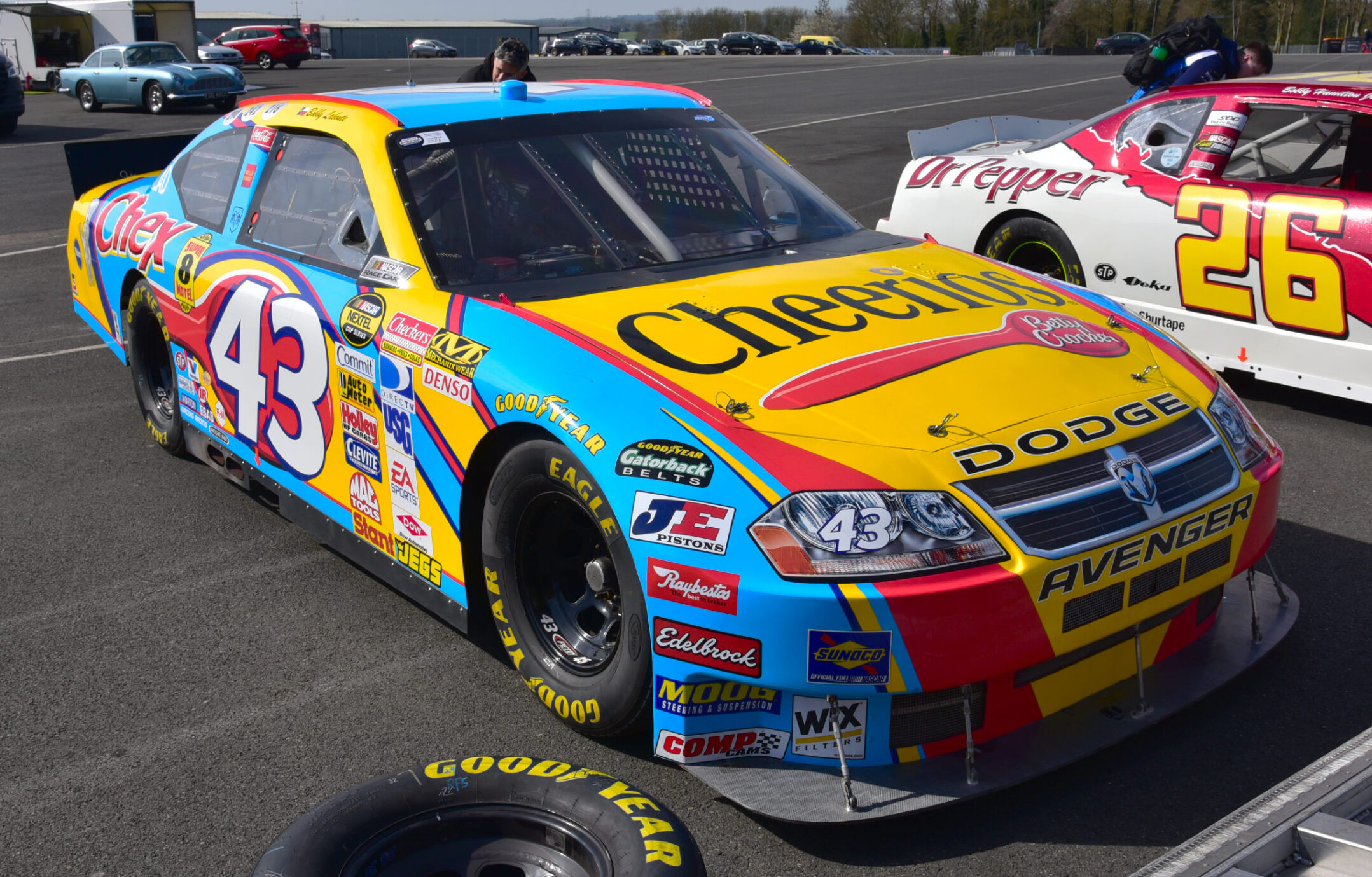
Bobby Labonte's NASCAR Dodge Avenger from 2007

The first-generation Dodge Avenger body style was widely used in the National Hot Rod Association and earned the most prominence driven by Darrell Alderman and Scott Geoffrion from 1994 until 2000 as the Dodge Boys.

The coupe was used for the 1994 and 1995 incarnations of the International Race of Champions. Although Dodge was IROC's car of choice since 1990, Dodge dropped out of this racing series after the 1995 season.

Avenger sheet metal was also used on race cars by several ARCA race teams from 1995 until 2000.

The Avenger replaced the Charger as Dodge's car for the 2007 NASCAR Nextel Cup Season. It appeared in Dodge Avenger grille, headlights, and taillights as the standard "spec" Car of Tomorrow (CoT) model. It got its first win with former Formula One driver Juan Pablo Montoya in the 2007 Toyota/Save Mart 350 at the Infineon Raceway.

In 2008, the Dodge CoT appearance was changed back to the Charger model.
