= Tom Kendall =

Australian cricketer

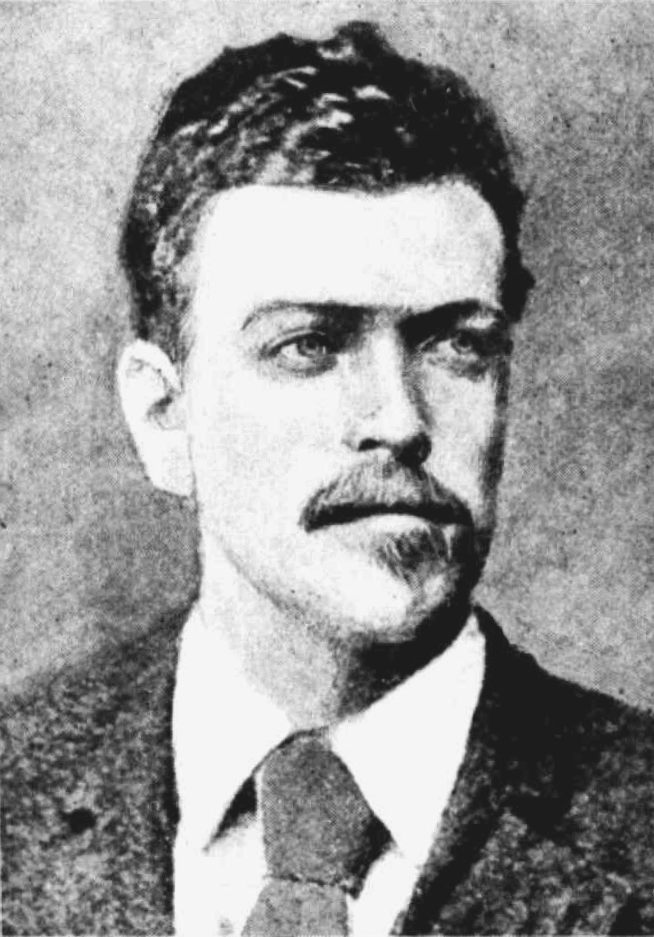

Personal information
- Born: 24 August 1851; Bedford, England
- Died: 17 August 1924 (aged 72); Hobart, Tasmania, Australia
- Batting: Left-handed
- Bowling: Left-arm medium

International information
- National side: Australia
- Test debut (cap 9): 15 March 1877 v England
- Last Test: 31 March 1877 v England

Career statistics
Competition	Test	First-class
Matches	2	8
Runs scored	39	141
Batting average	13.00	12.81
100s/50s	0/0	0/0
Top score	17*	43
Balls bowled	563	2,129
Wickets	14	40
Bowling average	15.35	16.64
5 wickets in innings	1	3
10 wickets in match	0	0
Best bowling	7/55	7/24
Catches/stumpings	2/–	6/–
- Source: CricInfo, 12 December 2018

Thomas Kingston Kendall (24 August 1851 – 17 August 1924) was an Australian cricketer, who played in two Test matches in 1877, including the inaugural Test which was played at the Melbourne Cricket Ground in March 1877.

Kendall was a lower-order left-handed batsman and a slow-to-medium pace left-arm bowler. His 14 wickets in the first two Tests show his ability and indeed Kendall's 7/55 in the last innings of the first-ever Test was an important part of the 45-run victory over the England side led by James Lillywhite. It was Kendall's bowling that induced the first Test match stumping, when he dismissed Alfred Shaw, via Jack Blackham's wicketkeeping. Both he and Shaw took eight wickets in the inaugural Test, but as Australia batted first Shaw took his first, but Kendall overtook this in the Second Test and his 14 Test wickets remained a (retrospective) record until passed by Fred Spofforth. It is not clear why he was omitted from the subsequent Australian team to tour England in 1878, a tour he was available for: he took part in some preliminary matches before the team was selected, although, according to Spofforth, Kendall gained a considerable amount of weight, which may have worked against him.

Kendall played in Melbourne club cricket for Richmond, and represented Victoria once. In 1881, he moved to Hobart where he was employed as a compositor by The Mercury newspaper. Tasmania did not have regular first-class cricket at that point and his subsequent cricket career was limited to four matches on a tour to New Zealand in 1884 and one against Victoria in 1889. He later stood as an umpire in Tasmanian cricket.

== Sources ==
- Mahony, P. (1984) Sundry Extras, The Hambledon Press: London. ISBN 0 907628 48 6.

Records
Preceded by Alfred Shaw	World Record – Most Career Wickets in Test cricket 14 wickets (15.35) in 2 Tests; Held record 31 March 1877 to 4 January 1879	Succeeded by Fred Spofforth
