= 2000 Delphi Indy 200 =

Motor race held in Orlando, Florida

(United States) 2000 Delphi Indy 200
Race details
- Race 1 of 9 (Note: At the time of the race, 10 races were included on the IRL's 2000 schedule.) in the 2000 Indy Racing League season
- Layout of Walt Disney World Speedway
- Date: January 29, 2000
- Official name: Delphi Indy 200
- Location: Walt Disney World Speedway; Orlando, Florida
- Course: Permanent racing facility 1.000 mi / 1.609 km
- Distance: 200 laps 200.000 mi / 321.869 km
- Weather: Cloudy, cool

Pole position
- Driver: (United States) Greg Ray (Team Menard)
- Time: Qualifying rained out; grid set by 1999 entrants' standings and practice speeds

Fastest lap
- Driver: (United States) Mark Dismore (Kelley Racing)
- Time: 22.205 (on lap 129 of 200)

Podium
- First: (United States) Robbie Buhl (Dreyer & Reinbold Racing)
- Second: (United States) Buddy Lazier (Hemelgarn Racing)
- Third: (United States) Eddie Cheever (Cheever Racing)

The 2000 Delphi Indy 200 was an Indy Racing League (IRL) motor race held at Walt Disney World Speedway in Orlando, Florida on January 29, 2000 before 35,000 spectators. It was the first round of the 2000 Indy Racing League and the fifth running of the event. The 200-lap race was won by Robbie Buhl of Dreyer & Reinbold Racing. Hemelgarn Racing driver Buddy Lazier finished second, and Eddie Cheever came in third for his self-owned Cheever Racing team.

After qualifying was rained out, defending series champion Greg Ray earned the pole position by virtue of the previous season's entrant points standings. Ray led the first 45 laps before being mired behind other drivers who were out of sequence with the leaders' pit stop strategies. He and several other drivers were forced to retire from the race due to gearbox failures. The race eventually wound down to three competitors – Lazier, Cheever, and Buhl. While trying to maneuver around a lapped car, Lazier drifted off-line and lost the top-two positions to Cheever and Buhl on lap 192. Cheever suffered a similar misfortune seven laps later, allowing Buhl to assume the lead and achieve his second and final career win, ending a winless streak that dated back to August 1997. It was also the only win for Dreyer & Reinbold Racing in their series debut.

With eight races remaining in the season, Buhl claimed the Drivers' Championship lead over Lazier and Cheever, as did Oldsmobile Aurora in the Engine Manufacturers' Championship and G-Force in the Chassis Manufacturers' Championship. This was the last IRL race at Walt Disney World Speedway because track officials and the league were unable to agree on a race date for 2001.

== Background ==
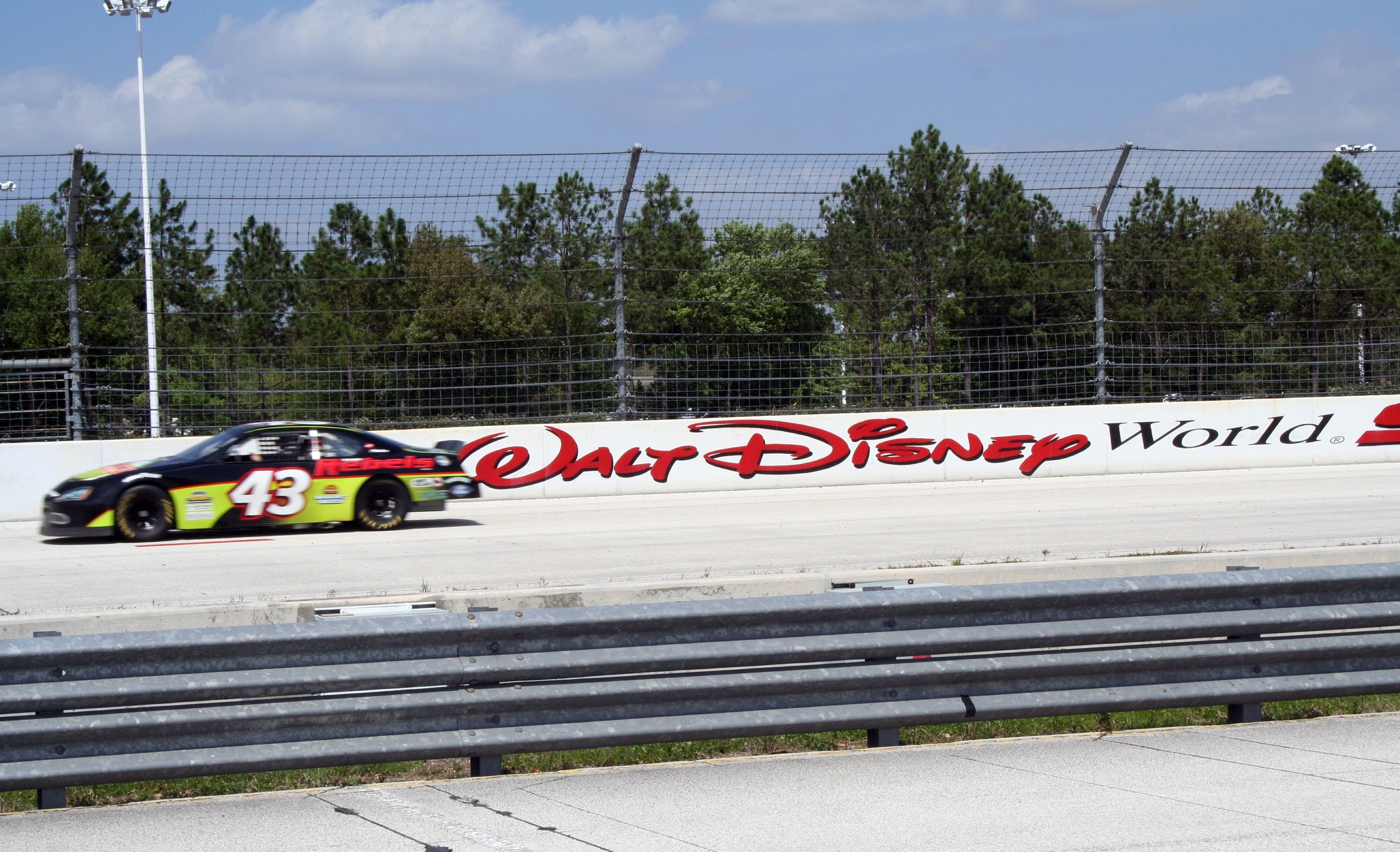
Walt Disney World Speedway, where the race was held.

The 2000 Indy 200 was the first of nine rounds in the 2000 Indy Racing League season and the fifth annual edition of the event. As it had been since its inaugural running in 1996, it was held at Walt Disney World Speedway, a three-turn 1 mile (1.6 km) paved tri-oval track in Orlando, Florida on Saturday, January 29, 2000. Eddie Cheever was the defending race winner. In December 1999, Delphi was announced as the event's title sponsor, thus renaming the race to the Delphi Indy 200.

=== Car specifications ===
Many changes were brought about to the cars of the Indy Racing League (IRL) ahead of the 2000 season. A new engine formula reduced the engine size from 4 to 3.5 L (0.88 to 0.77 imp gal; 1.06 to 0.92 US gal) in order to reduce costs and speeds. A crankshaft was also implemented which heavily altered the sound of the engines. The engines were no longer required to be production-based, so the series' manufacturers (Oldsmobile Aurora and Nissan Infiniti) were allowed to build engines that differed from those in their showrooms.

New chassis were also constructed by Dallara (the IR-00), G-Force (the GF05), and Riley & Scott (the Mk VII) after the IRL introduced rules for driver safety. Among the notable features of the chassis were a new sequential shifting gearbox, a cockpit opening widened to 19 in (480 mm), a thickened headrest, and widened sidepods.

=== Pre-season testing ===
To allow the teams to acquaint themselves with the new regulations, two tests were held at Walt Disney World Speedway before the start of the season. The first test featured 14 teams and was held on December 10–11, 1999. Greg Ray, donning the No. 1 in honor of his 1999 championship, led both testing sessions, which IRL race director Brian Barnhart and several drivers considered a success. Ray's fastest timed lap was less than three tenths of a second away from surpassing the track record set by Scott Sharp in a 4-liter engine earlier that year.

The second test was conducted on January 5–6, 2000, with 14 teams again participating. Ray continued proving his prowess with the series' new cars by recording the fastest laps of the session on January 5 in his primary and backup cars, several hours after Conseco announced their sponsorship of Ray for the 2000 season. The session on January 6, led by Stéphan Grégoire, was marred by a severe crash involving Sam Schmidt, who spun and slammed the wall in turn two with the left side of his car after driving over a bump on the track. Schmidt suffered irreparable damage between his third and fourth vertebrae, which left him a quadripalegic for the rest of his life and forced him to quit motor racing.

=== Driver changes ===
There were 26 cars entered for the Delphi Indy 200 that represented 21 different teams. Each car used Firestone tires because Goodyear had withdrawn from American open-wheel car racing after the 1999 season ended. Six drivers were set to compete in their first Indy Racing Northern Light Series race, the most notable of which was two-time Indianapolis 500 winner Al Unser Jr., who was not declared a rookie because of his long career in the CART FedEx Championship Series. Unser reunited with Galles Racing, the team which he drove for in his first Indianapolis 500 win in 1992. Sam Hornish Jr. and Airton Daré both broke away from CART's feeder series to join PDM Racing and TeamXtreme, respectively. Other series debutants include Jon Herb (Jonathan Byrd-McCormack Motorsports) and Doug Didero (Mid America Motorsports).

== Practice and qualifying ==
Three practice sessions preceded the race on Saturday, two on Thursday and one on Friday. The first practice session was to last for 150 minutes, the second for 120 minutes, and the third for 80 minutes. For all sessions, the drivers were split into two groups and received equal track time. The first session on Thursday morning was delayed by 75 minutes and shortened to a 90-minute duration because of cold track temperatures. Ray topped the speed charts with a 21.332-second lap, besting the times of Grégoire, Sharp, Scott Goodyear, and Tyce Carlson. Davey Hamilton did not participate in the session because of engine issues in his car.

In the afternoon session, Grégoire set the fastest overall time of the day at 21.266 seconds, with Buddy Lazier in second, Sharp in third, Robbie Buhl in fourth, and Jeff Ward in fifth. Although the speeds were expected to increase due to the rising temperatures, four of the fastest ten drivers of the day recorded their quick times in the morning. During the second group, John Hollansworth Jr. prompted a yellow flag because a loose oil-filter canister caused his car to spew smoke. Hollansworth was set back further when he spun at the exit of turn one and heavily damaged the right-rear corner of his car. His team managed to repair the car by Friday morning.

Grégoire again showcased fast speed by posting a lap time of 21.381 seconds in the final practice session, with Buhl (who spun while exiting pit road), Mark Dismore, Jeret Schroeder, and Buddy Lazier rounding out the top-five. Only 16 drivers completed at least one lap before the session came to a premature end due to rainfall. The rain showers persisted, and at 2:28 p.m. Eastern Standard Time (UTC−05:00), the qualifying session was cancelled. The starting grid was determined by the 1999 entrants point standings; cars that were not entered in any race of the 1999 season were placed behind the cars that did, based on their quickest practice speeds in the weekend. Ray was thus awarded the pole position, with Ward in second, Dismore third, Robby McGehee in fourth, and Buddy Lazier in fifth. Cheever, Sharp, Goodyear, Billy Boat, and Eliseo Salazar completed the top-ten positions. Because qualifying was rained out, no bonus points were awarded to the top-three starters. Brian Barnhart allowed an additional warm-up session to be held on Saturday at 10:15 a.m; the results of the session were not recorded.

== Race ==
The weather towards the start of the 200-lap, 200 mi (320 km) race was overcast, with air temperatures recorded at 78 °F (26 °C) and track temperatures at 85 °F (29 °C). About 35,000 spectators attended the race. Pre-race festivities began with an invocation from Reverend Ted Pierce of the First Presbyterian Church of Orlando and a performance of the national anthem by musician James Hutchinson. J. T. Batternberg III, the chairman, president, and chief executive officer of Delphi, commanded the drivers to start their engines. Three-time Indianapolis 500 winner Johnny Rutherford drove the pace car to lead the drivers in their three parade laps before the race began. 20th-place Didero and 21st-place Niclas Jönsson were moved to the rear of the field due to their slow practice speeds, while one of Hollansworth's sidepods was replaced because the battery in his black box was dead.

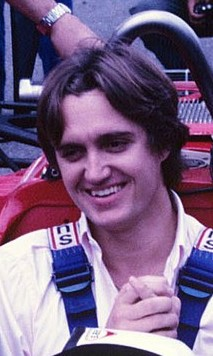
Eddie Cheever (pictured in 1986), defending race winner, was passed for the lead with two laps to go and finished third.

The race began at 12:00 p.m. with a rolling start; Ray maintained his pole position advantage on the first lap. Two laps later, the first caution flag was issued for Jaques Lazier, who spun at the exit of turn two while passing Goodyear. Lazier made a pit stop to change his tires, which were worn by the spin. Green-flag racing resumed on the sixth lap, with Ray gaining a 3.4-second advantage over the rest of the field during the next twelve laps. Meanwhile, by the tenth lap, Buddy Lazier had improved from fifth to third place. The following lap, McGehee lost control of his car in turn one and slid to the apron; the incident did not result in a caution. By the 17th lap, Calkins had made his way up to fourth place, while Buddy Lazier had overtaken Ward for second place. The second caution flag was flown on lap 24 when Hamilton spun backwards into the outside wall in the first turn. Upon stepping out of his car, Hamilton complained of back pain, so he was transported by ambulance to the Sand Lake Hospital for precautionary X-rays.

During the caution period, Sharp's car came to a stop towards turn three with a broken gearbox and was towed to pit road. He rejoined the race during the lap-35 restart. Jönsson spun at the second turn two laps later, but did not necessitate a caution because he quickly drove off without further incident. Conversely, the caution was issued for the third time when debris was spotted in turn one on the 44th lap. Most of the leaders, including Ray, took advantage of the caution period to pit for fuel and new tires. Boat and a handful of other drivers elected not to make a pit stop, having already pitted earlier in the race, and led at the restart on the 49th lap. Buhl passed Boat for the lead the next lap, and by lap 60, Boat had also lost second place to Donnie Beechler and third place to Ray. Beechler was overtaken by Ray for the second position on lap 66, but both drivers were 4.3 seconds behind Buhl. That same lap, Al Unser Jr. entered pit road with engine issues, bringing an early end to his first IRL race.

The race's fourth caution was thrown on lap 67 when Herb slowed his car at the exit of turn three and slightly contacted other cars around him. It was later discovered that he had sustained damage to the left-front portion of his suspension. Boat, Beechler, and a few other drivers made stops under the caution. Stéphan Grégoire pitted three times to make adjustments to his rear wing, as he felt that his car was driving loosely. During the restart on the 75th lap, Buddy Lazier got by Ray for second place in the first turn. The running order remained unchanged, with Buhl amassing a 2.2-second lead over Lazier, until the caution was issued for the fifth time on lap 95 because Robby Unser had crashed into the wall between the second and third turns. During the leaders' pit stops, Ray briefly reclaimed the lead on lap 97, followed by Boat on the 98th and 99th laps.

Beechler assumed the lead ahead of the lap-106 restart, followed by Dismore, Buddy Lazier, Buhl, and Cheever. Buhl quickly fell to sixth place behind Cheever and Salazar. On the 109th lap, Dismore swerved low in the second turn to pass Beechler for the lead. Beechler was then overtaken by Lazier in the next turn. The caution flag was thrown for the sixth time when Jaques Lazier crashed into the front stretch wall with the rear end of his car and stopped under the flagman area. He was taken to the Orlando Regional Medical Center by ambulance after also having complained of pain in his back. The end fin on McGehee's nose was rubbing against one of his front tires, which resulted in three pit stops to repair his front wing. During the lap-124 restart, Cheever quickly got around Beechler for fourth place, and later took third from Salazar. Dismore set the fastest lap of the race five laps later, at 22.205 seconds.

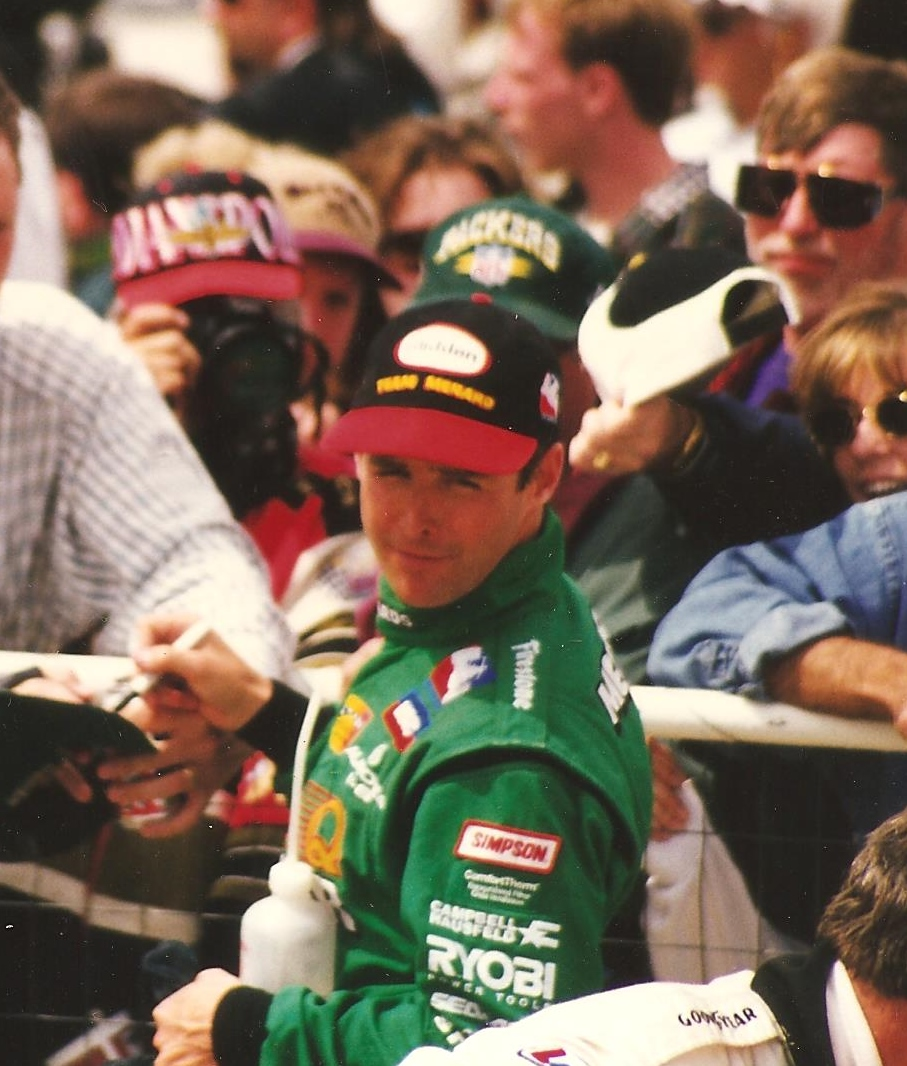
Robbie Buhl (pictured in 1997) earned his second and final IRL victory and the only win for his team, Dreyer & Reinbold Racing.

On lap 136, the caution flag was issued for the seventh time when Hornish skidded into the infield grass while trying to maneuver around traffic in turn one. Ray's chances of winning had completely depleted when his car stalled as a result of an issue with his gearbox, which his team replaced. McGehee claimed the lead during the sequence because his team determined that he was able to finish the race without making another pit stop. However, on lap 145, one lap after the restart, Buddy Lazier overtook McGehee for the lead, and on lap 150, McGehee fell to third place behind Cheever. Behind the three drivers, Dismore pulled into pit road on the 147th lap, relaying to his team that he, too, had suffered a gearbox failure, as did Schroeder four laps later. Dismore's team poured oil into his transmission cooler to get him back in the race on lap 156, whereas Schroeder had fallen out entirely.

The race had finally settled into a rhythm for drivers using the Riley & Scott chassis, as Buddy Lazier maintained a two-second advantage over Cheever. This was until the 176th lap, when a spin by Didero on the back stretch prompted the eighth (and final) caution. Following the restart on lap 182, Lazier, Cheever, and Buhl became the clear contenders for the win. Fourth-placed Goodyear was setting faster lap times than the three drivers, but was too far behind them to charge to the front. On the 192nd lap, Lazier was held up by Hornish in turn one, allowing Cheever to overtake him for the lead. Buhl passed Lazier for the second position in turn one the following lap as Lazier had collected marbles in his tires from driving off-line and struggled to regain grip.

Although Buhl previously complained of an understeering car, he managed to close in on Cheever by lap 196, shrinking his lead from 0.8 seconds to 0.3 seconds. Two laps later, Cheever approached Didero, who had already been lapped several times. Coming off of turn three, Didero steered low, then turned up the track, which forced Cheever off the racing line entering turn one on the 199th lap and broke his momentum. Buhl dove to the inside line to take the lead from Cheever and led the final two laps to earn his second career IRL victory; his first win had occurred almost three years prior in the 1997 Pennzoil 200. His 22nd starting position was the lowest of any winner in IRL history at that point. (Note: The record was previously held by Cheever, who won the 1998 Indianapolis 500 from the 17th starting position. It was broken by Buddy Lazier in the series' next race, the 2000 MCI WorldCom Indy 200, as he won from the 26th starting position.) It was also the first (and, as of 2026, only) win for Dreyer & Reinbold Racing in their first start in the series. Lazier overtook Cheever on the final lap for second place, dropping the latter to third. Goodyear came in fourth, followed by Salazar in fifth, Beechler in sixth, Ward in seventh, Calkins in eighth, Boat in ninth, and McGehee in tenth. During the course of the race, the lead was swapped 11 times between eight different drivers. Race winner Buhl led the most laps, at 49.

=== Post-race ===
"It was, as a driver, great satisfaction. But as a team, putting that together from an operational and business standpoint, it was a good shot in the arm to say ‘hey, we can provide results’. It’s kind of strange because there was no podium set-up for the race, it was just out on the track, but one thing that was cool was I got to be the grand marshal for the Disney World Parade the next day! Again I love Disney so that was a cool thing. My kids now when I remind them of that, they’re like ‘you’re so weird!’. I’m like ‘no, I really liked that, it was cool!’"

— Robbie Buhl reflecting on his final win in an interview with The Race in 2020.

During victory lane interviews, Buhl said of his pace during the last ten laps: "We did have a good race car. The last ten laps with Eddie (Cheever), I'd say we both had good race cars. I wasn't losing ground, and I wasn't gaining ground. And if we hadn't caught traffic, it might have continued that way. You wait for a break and have to be ready capitalize on it." He also considered the win "a big shot in the arm" for his team because his deal to race for them materialized only three weeks prior to the race. He earned $139,000 for his victory. Second-place Buddy Lazier was left subdued with the result and expressed his desire to win a race again, having failed to do so since the 1997 VisionAire 500. Cheever, who finished third, was fuming through radio communications and had to be calmed by several track officials, including IRL founder Tony George, after the race. He later commented: "It is a false race when people get in the way. We deserved to win today, and we didn't. The crews and the crew chiefs are the ones to thank today. This was a very tough day to race, and this is a very tough track to race on." He also likened the finish to that of the 1997 Pennzoil 200, which he also lost after being passed by Buhl with two laps to go.

Despite Al Unser Jr.'s engine failure, he held a positive outlook about his first race in the IRL: "It's been awhile since I had that much fun. It's always good when you get to pass on the racetrack. We took a chance on our race setup today since we didn't get to practice. But Alan (Mertens, Unser's crew chief) dialed it in perfect. A lot of the old memories from running with Rick (Galles, owner of Galles Racing) before came back today." Dismore was let down by his gearbox failure, "Our car had just come in, and the race was coming to us," but he still anticipated the next round at Phoenix International Raceway. Hamilton was released from the Sand Lake Hospital on Saturday night after being diagnosed with a minimal fracture to the T12 vertebra. Jaques Lazier, meanwhile, suffered an L1 vertebral compression fracture and was fitted with a brace. He was released from the Orlando Regional Medical Center on Monday morning. While Hamilton was cleared to drive at Phoenix, Lazier was substituted by Bobby Regester for the race before returning in the Vegas Indy 300.

As this was the first race of the season, the final result meant that Buhl had earned the lead in the Drivers' Championship with 52 championship points. Buddy Lazier trailed him by 12 points, while Cheever was 17 points in arrears. Goodyear and Salazar rounded out the top-five in the standings with 32 and 30 points, respectively. Oldsmobile Aurora earned 10 points in the Engine Manufacturers' Championship, leading Nissan Infiniti by three points. As for the Chassis Manufacturers' Championship, G-Force led on 10 points, followed by Riley & Scott with seven and Dallara with five, as eight races remained in the season. The IRL did not return to Walt Disney World Speedway after 2000 because the league was unable to find a suitable race date for their 2001 schedule. The track never hosted another professional motor race again, though it remained available for testing and the Richard Petty Driving Experience until it was demolished in 2015.

=== Race classification ===
Final race results
Pos	No.	Driver	Team	Laps	Time/Retired	Grid	Laps led	Points
1	24	(United States) Robbie Buhl	Dreyer & Reinbold Racing	200	1:57:18.676	22	49	52^{1}
2	91	(United States) Buddy Lazier	Hemelgarn Racing	200	+3.165	5	47	40
3	51	(United States) Eddie Cheever	Cheever Racing	200	+3.624	6	8	35
4	4	(Canada) Scott Goodyear	Panther Racing	200	+3.986	8	0	32
5	11	(Chile) Eliseo Salazar	A. J. Foyt Enterprises	200	+6.990	10	0	30
6	98	(United States) Donnie Beechler	Cahill Racing	200	+14.216	15	9	28
7	14	(United States) Jeff Ward	A. J. Foyt Enterprises	200	+19.287	2	0	26
8	12	(United States) Buzz Calkins	Bradley Motorsports	200	+20.091	11	0	24
9	81	(United States) Billy Boat	Team Pelfrey	200	+21.496	9	6	22
10	55	(United States) Robby McGehee	Treadway Racing	200	+24.847	4	5	20
11	88	(Brazil) Airton Daré	TeamXtreme	199	+1 Lap	25	0	19
12	27	(Sweden) Niclas Jönsson	Blueprint Racing Enterprises	198	+2 Laps	21	0	18
13	20	(United States) Tyce Carlson	Hubbard-Immke Racing	197	+3 Laps	23	0	17
14	43	(Canada) Doug Didero	Mid America Motorsports	195	+5 Laps	20	0	16
15	8	(United States) Scott Sharp	Kelley Racing	186	+14 Laps	7	0	15
16	28	(United States) Mark Dismore	Kelley Racing	183	Oil cooler	3	30	14
17	1	(United States) Greg Ray	Team Menard	180	+20 Laps	1	46	13
18	7	(France) Stéphan Grégoire	Dick Simon Racing	174	+26 Laps	13	0	12
19	6	(United States) Jeret Schroeder	Tri Star Motorsports	174	Oil cooler	16	0	11
20	18	(United States) Sam Hornish Jr.	PDM Racing	172	+28 Laps	19	0	10
21	42	(United States) John Hollansworth Jr.	TeamXtreme	136	Electrical	14	0	9
22	30	(United States) Jon Herb	Jonathan Byrd-McCormack Motorsports	114	Handling	26	0	8
23	33	(United States) Jaques Lazier	Truscelli Team Racing	110	Accident	12	0	7
24	9	(United States) Robby Unser	Tri Star Motorsports	93	Accident	18	0	6
25	3	(United States) Al Unser Jr.	Galles Racing	64	Engine	24	0	5
26	44	(United States) Davey Hamilton	Sinden Racing Service	22	Accident	17	0	4

Notes

- ^1 – Includes two bonus points for leading the most laps.

== Championship standings after the race ==
Drivers' Championship standings
+/-	Pos.	Driver	Points
	1	(United States) Robbie Buhl	52
	2	(United States) Buddy Lazier	40 (–12)
	3	(United States) Eddie Cheever	35 (–17)
	4	(Canada) Scott Goodyear	32 (–20)
	5	(Chile) Eliseo Salazar	30 (–22)

Engine Manufacturers' Championship standings
+/-	Pos.	Manufacturer	Points
	1	(United States) Oldsmobile Aurora	10
	2	(Japan) Nissan Infiniti	7 (–3)

Chassis Manufacturers' Championship standings
+/-	Pos.	Manufacturer	Points
	1	(United States) G-Force	10
	2	(United States) Riley & Scott	7 (–3)
	3	(Italy) Dallara	5 (–5)

- Note: Only the top five positions are included for the Drivers' Championship standings.

== Notes and references ==
=== References ===
Previous race: 1999 Mall.com 500	IndyCar Series; 2000 season	Next race: 2000 MCI WorldCom Indy 200
Previous race: 1999 TransWorld Diversified Services Indy 200	Delphi Indy 200	Next race: N/A
