= Yellow Banners =

The Yellow Banners were:

- Plain Yellow Banner
- Bordered Yellow Banner
- Yellow flag (disambiguation)
