= 2003 Firestone Indy 400 =

Motor race held in Brooklyn, Michigan

(United States) 2003 Firestone Indy 400
Race details
- Race 10 of 16 in the 2003 IndyCar season
- Map of Michigan International Speedway
- Date: July 27, 2003
- Official name: Firestone Indy 400
- Location: Michigan International Speedway; Brooklyn, Michigan, United States
- Course: Permanent racing facility 2.000 mi / 3.219 km
- Distance: 200 laps 400.000 mi / 643.738 km
- Weather: Cloudy with temperatures of 81 °F (27 °C)

Pole position
- Driver: (South Africa) Tomas Scheckter (Chip Ganassi Racing)
- Time: 32.3657

Fastest lap
- Driver: (United States) Bryan Herta (Andretti Green Racing)
- Time: 32.2730 (on lap 12 of 200)

Podium
- First: (United States) Alex Barron (Mo Nunn Racing)
- Second: (United States) Sam Hornish Jr. (Panther Racing)
- Third: (South Africa) Tomas Scheckter (Chip Ganassi Racing)

The 2003 Firestone Indy 400 was an IRL IndyCar Series open-wheel race that was held on July 27, 2003, in Brooklyn, Michigan at Michigan International Speedway before 30,000 spectators. Contested over 200 laps, it was the 10th round of the 2003 IRL IndyCar Series and the second running of the event. Alex Barron of Mo Nunn Racing won the race starting from the sixth position. Panther Racing driver Sam Hornish Jr. finished second and Tomas Scheckter came in third for Chip Ganassi Racing.

Scheckter won the pole position, the fifth of his career and second consecutive at Michigan, by posting the fastest lap of qualifications. Hornish Jr. led 126 laps—more than any other competitor—as his performance was boosted by a new variant of the Chevrolet Indy V8 engine, which sparked controversy among some drivers. Along with Hornish Jr., the first position was hotly contested throughout the race by Scheckter, Scott Dixon, and Barron, the latter of whom spun into Scheckter on the 164th lap but avoided causing any damage to his car. The last green-flag stint, beginning on lap 169, saw Hornish Jr. and Barron battle for the win, with Hornish Jr. utilizing the inside line to his advantage. Barron finally nosed ahead of Hornish Jr. on the final lap to take the victory by 0.0121 seconds, the fourth-closest finish in IndyCar Series history (at the time). Barron, substituting for the injured Felipe Giaffone, earned his and Mo Nunn Racing's second and final win in the IndyCar Series.

With six races left in the season, Tony Kanaan, who led the Drivers' Championship prior to the race, fell to second behind fifth-place finisher Dixon as Gil de Ferran was relegated from second to third. Toyota continued holding their lead in the Manufacturers' Championship over Honda and Chevrolet.

== Background ==
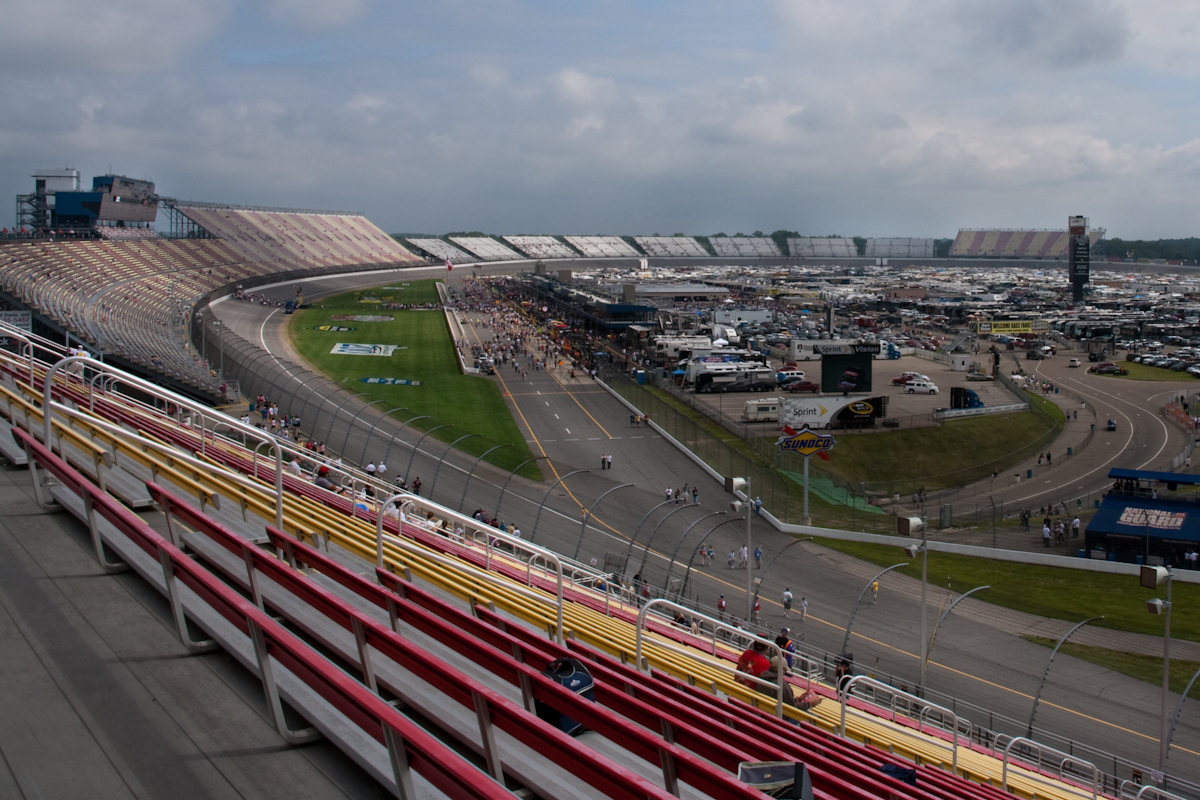
Michigan International Speedway (pictured in 2010), where the race was held.

The Firestone Indy 400 was the tenth of 18 scheduled open-wheel races for the 2003 IRL IndyCar Series and the second annual edition of the event dating back to 2002. It was held on July 27, 2003 in Brooklyn, Michigan, United States, at Michigan International Speedway, a four-turn 2 mi (3.2 km) asphalt tri-oval track with 18-degree banking in the corners, 12-degree banking in the front stretch, and 5-degree banking in the back stretch, and was contested over 200 laps and 400 miles (640 km). Before the race, Tony Kanaan led the Drivers' Championship with 303 points, 14 more than Gil de Ferran in second and 15 more than Scott Dixon in third. Hélio Castroneves held fourth on 282 points and Kenny Bräck, with 245 points, was fifth. In the Manufacturers' Championship, Toyota led on 84 points, followed by Honda with 67 and Chevrolet with 47. Tomas Scheckter was the defending race winner. Between the 21 entries for the race, the lone driver change was of Mo Nunn Racing's No. 21 car, which was driven by Alex Barron for the second consecutive race while Felipe Giaffone recovered from injuries that he suffered in a crash during the Kansas Indy 300.

A private testing session was held for rookie drivers Dan Wheldon and Roger Yasukawa at Michigan International Speedway on July 1 to prepare for the Firestone Indy 400. Wheldon and Yasukawa completed a combined total of over 160 laps without incident, and both drivers later stated that the pack racing at Michigan would force competitors to have patience in order to succeed. Chevrolet debuted the "Generation IV" variant of their Indy V8 engine, manufactured by Cosworth, for this race after General Motors received clearance from the Indy Racing League (IRL). Although mid-season engine changes are usually forbidden, IRL vice president Brian Barnhart noted that Chevrolet was at a "performance deficiency" compared to Honda and Toyota. Sam Hornish Jr. was selected to drive with the engine in the Firestone Indy 400 as he was the highest Chevrolet driver in the Drivers' Championship standings; the next-highest Chevrolet driver in the standings would obtain the new engine for the succeeding Emerson Indy 250. The IRL's decision to permit the new engine drew criticism from drivers, with Dixon calling the decision "kind of shady" and Greg Ray feeling that it was a bad move from a financial standpoint.

== Practice and qualifying ==
Four practice sessions preceded the race on Sunday, two on Friday and two on Saturday. The first two sessions lasted 90 minutes and were both divided into two groups that were determined by the entrant points standings and received equal track time. The third lasted 60 minutes and the fourth 30 minutes. Hornish Jr. was fastest in the first practice session on Friday morning with a time of 32.1677 seconds, nine hundredths of a second quicker than second-placed Bräck. Dixon, Bryan Herta, and Barron rounded out the top-five. Later that day, Dixon's time of 32.3605 seconds made him the quickest driver of the second practice session, besting Hornish Jr., Scheckter, Barron, and Wheldon. On Saturday morning, Dixon again led the third practice session with a time of 32.3682 seconds, with Scheckter in second, Ray in third, Hornish Jr. in fourth, and Barron in fifth.

During the qualifying session later in the morning, held under warm and somewhat windy conditions, each driver was required to complete up to two timed laps, with the fastest of the two determining their starting position. Scheckter earned his fifth career pole position and his second consecutive at Michigan with a quickest time of 32.3657 seconds. He was joined on the grid's front row by his Chip Ganassi Racing teammate Dixon, who held the pole position until Scheckter's lap. A gust of wind helped Castroneves qualify third, ahead of Hornish Jr. in fourth and Al Unser Jr. in fifth. Barron, Ray, and Bräck occupied the next three positions. De Ferran took the ninth position after his team alleviated a mechanical issue during the third practice session, while Scott Sharp started in 10th. The rest of the starting positions were taken by Tora Takagi, Yasukawa, Andretti Green Racing teammates Wheldon, Herta, and Kanaan, A. J. Foyt IV, Vítor Meira, Buddy Rice, Robbie Buhl, Sarah Fisher, and Buddy Lazier.

The fourth and final practice session on Saturday afternoon was led by Scheckter with a time of 32.4822 seconds, with second-quickest driver Sharp trailing by four hundredths of a second. Barron was third, Herta fourth, and Wheldon fifth.

=== Qualifying classification ===
Pos	No.	Driver	Team	Time	Speed	Grid
1	10	(South Africa) Tomas Scheckter	Chip Ganassi Racing	32.3657	222.458	1
2	9	(New Zealand) Scott Dixon	Chip Ganassi Racing	32.3704	222.425	2
3	3	(Brazil) Hélio Castroneves	Team Penske	32.4393	221.953	3
4	4	(United States) Sam Hornish Jr.	Panther Racing	32.4563	221.837	4
5	31	(United States) Al Unser Jr.	Kelley Racing	32.5108	221.465	5
6	21	(United States) Alex Barron	Mo Nunn Racing	32.5222	221.387	6
7	13	(United States) Greg Ray	Access Motorsports	32.5286	221.344	7
8	15	(Sweden) Kenny Bräck	Team Rahal	32.5878	220.942	8
9	6	(Brazil) Gil de Ferran	Team Penske	32.5988	220.867	9
10	8	(United States) Scott Sharp	Kelley Racing	32.6580	220.467	10
11	12	(Japan) Toranosuke Takagi	Mo Nunn Racing	32.7036	220.159	11
12	55	(United States) Roger Yasukawa	Fernández Racing	32.7350	219.948	12
13	26	(United Kingdom) Dan Wheldon	Andretti Green Racing	32.8099	219.446	13
14	27	(United States) Bryan Herta	Andretti Green Racing	32.8577	219.127	14
15	11	(Brazil) Tony Kanaan	Andretti Green Racing	32.9059	218.806	15
16	14	(United States) A. J. Foyt IV	A. J. Foyt Racing	32.9442	218.551	16
17	2	(Brazil) Vítor Meira	Team Menard	33.1127	217.439	17
18	52	(United States) Buddy Rice	Team Cheever	33.3599	215.828	18
19	24	(United States) Robbie Buhl	Dreyer & Reinbold Racing	33.5761	214.438	19
20	23	(United States) Sarah Fisher	Dreyer & Reinbold Racing	33.5852	214.380	20
21	91	(United States) Buddy Lazier	Hemelgarn Racing	33.7884	213.091	21

== Race ==
Weather conditions towards the start of the race were overcast and windy, with air temperatures at 81 °F (27 °C) and track temperatures measured at 98 °F (37 °C). Approximately 30,000 people attended the event. Live television coverage of the race in the United States was provided by ABC and hosted by Bob Jenkins, with Paul Page and Scott Goodyear serving as commentators and Jack Arute, Gary Gerould, and Jerry Punch taking the roles of pit reporters. Al Unser, four-time Indianapolis 500 winner, commanded the drivers to start their engines. During the pace laps, Yasukawa believed one of his sidepods was loose and drove into pit road, only for his crew to discover it was not. The race began at 3:00 pm. local time (UTC−04:00) with Firestone brand marketing executive director Phil Pacsi waving the green flag.

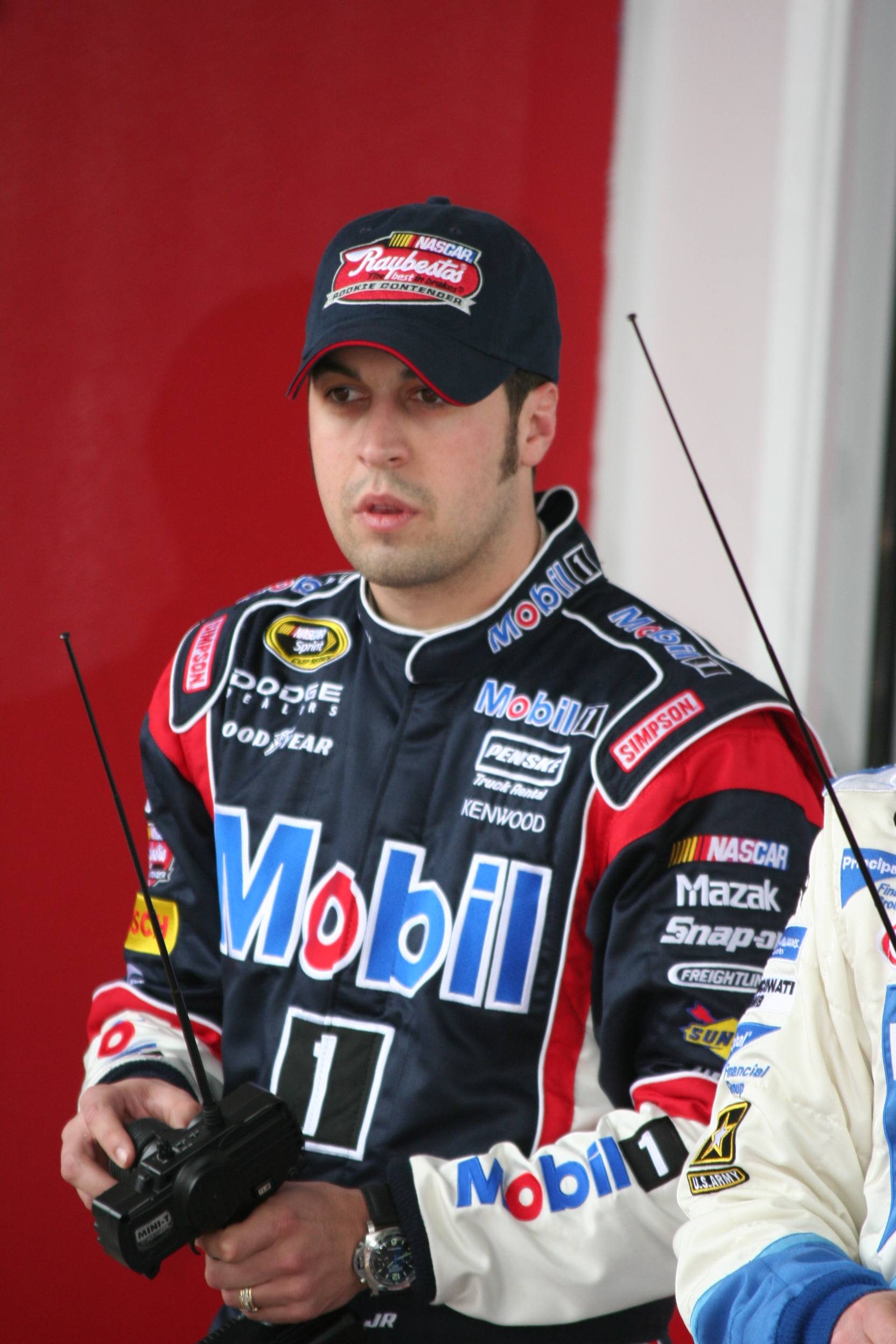
Sam Hornish Jr. (pictured in 2008) led a race-high 126 laps with an improved version of the Chevrolet Indy V8 engine.

On the first lap, Hornish Jr. immediately swerved up the track to take the lead as Dixon improved to second, Kanaan moved up ten positions into fifth place, and pole sitter Scheckter was relegated to sixth. While Dixon trailed closely behind Hornish Jr., Bräck moved to the third position by lap four. Two laps later, Kanaan, Barron, Bräck, Scheckter and Castroneves all raced alongside each other for third. Scheckter took the position on lap seven, passed Dixon a lap later, and overtook Hornish Jr. on the outside line of turn one for the lead on the 10th lap. By lap 11, Dixon fell to fourth place behind Castroneves. Meira, who was in tenth place, slowed on the front stretch on lap 17; he drove into pit road two laps later and exited the car as a small fire emerged from an internal fuel leak. Wheldon's car began spewing smoke because of an engine failure on the 20th lap, forcing him to retire from the race. Ten laps later, Hornish Jr. drove up the track to take the lead from Scheckter in the third corner. Dixon briefly lost fourth place to Kanaan before reclaiming the position on lap 31, and Scheckter drove on the inside line to take back the lead from Hornish Jr. on lap 34.

The first round of green-flag pit stops began on the 38th lap with Hornish Jr. giving up second place to make his stop. Herta, running in the eighth position, came in with an engine issue and became the race's third retiree. Scheckter made his stop on lap 42, relinquishing the lead to Dixon for the next two laps. After Barron pitted on the 46th lap, Dixon picked up the lead once again. Scheckter steered to Dixon's left-hand side on the backstretch a lap later to retake the lead. Hornish Jr. passed Dixon for second place on lap 49 and drove alongside Scheckter in an attempt to claim the first position; Hornish Jr. led lap 50 and Scheckter led the next lap before Hornish Jr. pulled ahead of Scheckter on the 52nd lap. Five laps later, Scheckter again tried racing side-by-side with Hornish Jr. until the first caution flag of the race was flown for debris found on the track. All of the leaders, excluding Ray and Fisher, made stops under the caution period for tires and fuel. After Foyt IV exited pit road, he sensed a problem within his car and drove back in. His right-rear tire then fell off his car and bounced into the inside wall, nearly hitting several spotters in the process.

Hornish Jr. led the field back up to speed for the restart on lap 64, followed by Castroneves, Kanaan, Dixon, and Scheckter. On the next lap, Bräck's car experienced a mechanical issue and slid into the outside wall in turn two, necessitating the second caution flag. During the caution, Castroneves' faulty radiator leaked oil into his engine, sidelining him from the rest of the race. Green-flag racing resumed on the 71st lap, with Hornish Jr. maintaining his lead over Kanaan, Dixon, Scheckter, and Barron. By lap 76, Unser Jr. moved into fourth place ahead of Scheckter and Barron, while Unser Jr.'s Kelley Racing teammate Sharp came into pit road with a punctured tire. He rejoined the track a lap behind the leaders. Over the next 14 laps, Kanaan trailed Hornish Jr. by as little as 0.1 seconds but was unable to overtake him. Kanaan was then passed by Scheckter for second place on the 91st lap. Hornish Jr.'s lead grew to one second over Scheckter by lap 100.

Green-flag pit stops commenced for the second time on lap 104; Hornish Jr. pitted for fresh tires and a refueling on the 106th lap, giving up the lead to Scheckter for the next four laps before his stop. Kanaan and Unser Jr. each led a lap until they came into pit road. With Barron entering pit road on lap 114, Hornish Jr. reclaimed the lead and was 4.7 seconds ahead of Scheckter. As Scheckter was relegated to fourth place by Barron and Unser Jr., Hornish Jr. continued extending his lead throughout the 31 succeeding laps. He held a 7.8-second advantage until the third caution flag was issued on lap 145 for debris spotted on the track. The leaders again made pit stops during the caution. Hornish Jr. nearly collided into the rear of Dixon's car exiting pit road, dropping him to sixth.

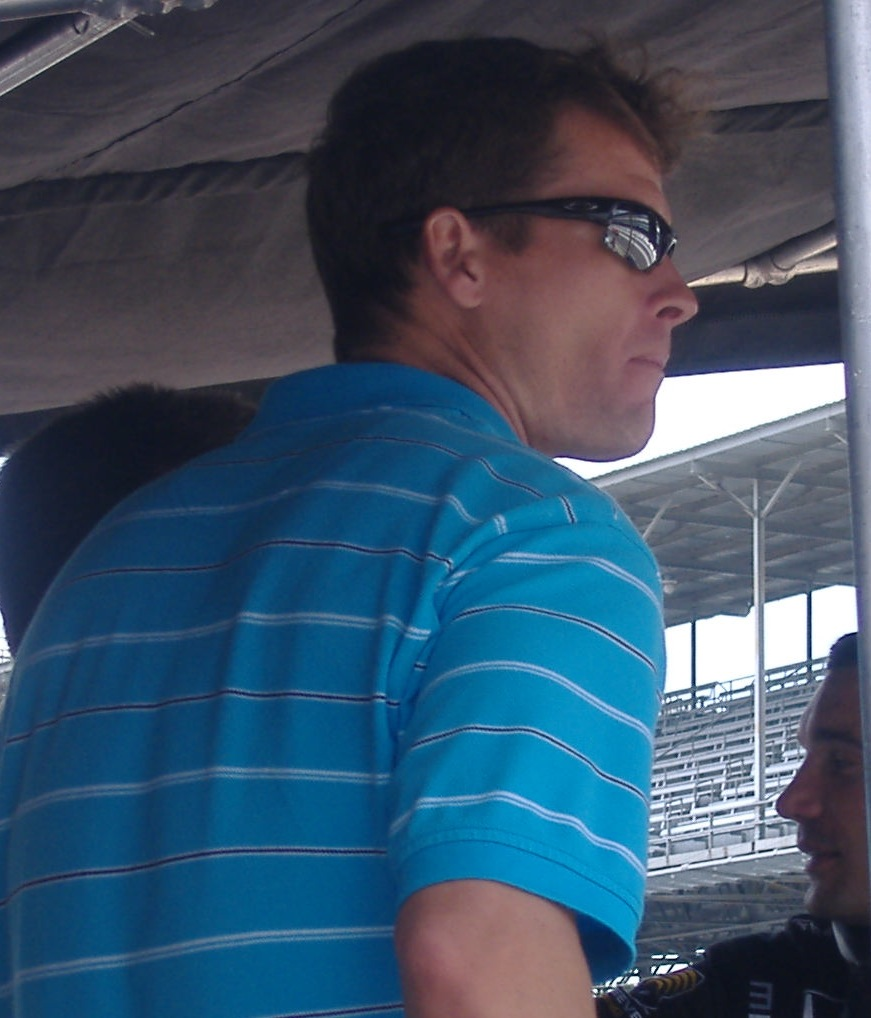
Alex Barron (pictured in 2006) earned his second and final IndyCar Series win by 0.0121 seconds.

Barron exited pit road first and led the field at the lap-151 restart, with Unser Jr. in second and Dixon in third. Hornish Jr. drove to the inside line to move into third place in turn one, only to lose two positions in the third turn. He moved back into third on lap 153, by which point Takagi improved from seventh to second, 0.05 seconds behind his Mo Nunn Racing teammate Barron. On lap 155, Hornish Jr. pulled ahead of Takagi on the front stretch to take second. Kanaan's car lost power while running in seventh place on lap 157, which led him into retirement. As Takagi was dropped to seventh in the running order, Hornish Jr. drove to the right side of Barron to try to take the lead, to no avail. Seven laps later, Hornish Jr. finally pulled ahead of Barron in turn four as they and Scheckter drove three-abreast for the lead. Barron then drifted up into Scheckter and they both made contact, sending Barron spinning into the front stretch grass. Barron managed to regain control of his car without sustaining any damage. The fourth (and final) caution was prompted, and most of the leaders, including Hornish Jr., made their final pit stops for fuel.

Unser Jr. was the lone driver not to make a stop and assumed the lead for the restart on the 169th lap, though Hornish Jr. accelerated quicker than him and overtook him for the lead. On lap 170, Unser Jr. fell to ninth place as Scheckter, Hornish Jr., and Takagi ran alongside each other, with Scheckter leading the lap. Hornish Jr. nosed ahead of Scheckter to take the lead for the next two laps. By utilizing Hornish Jr.'s slipstream, Barron gained enough momentum to move into second place, though he failed to take the lead from Scheckter. Scheckter, Hornish Jr., and Barron drove three-wide for the lead on lap 175. Scheckter continued to hold his lead until the 177th and 178th laps, when Hornish Jr. charged ahead by less than a tenth of a second. Scheckter led once more on lap 179, but was again overtaken by Hornish Jr. on the next lap.

Hornish Jr. and Barron began pulling away from the rest of the field and raced alongside each other for the lead, with Hornish Jr. leading laps 180–189 while holding onto a 0.02-second advantage. Meanwhile, Sharp moved up to third on the 188th lap. On lap 190, Barron eked ahead of Hornish Jr. by seven thousandths of a second, but lost the lead to Hornish Jr. the next lap. Scheckter overtook Sharp for third place by lap 193 and remained steadily behind Hornish Jr. and Barron, the latter of whom briefly assumed the lead yet again on laps 194 and 195. On the 196th lap, Scheckter raced alongside Barron for the second position, allowing Hornish Jr. to get by Barron for the lead and briefly lengthen his advantage over him. Barron attempted to gain a draft and execute a slingshot pass several times over the next three laps, but failed and drove behind Hornish Jr.

On the final lap, Barron steered up to the outside line in turn three as Hornish Jr. raced on the inside. Barron was able to garner enough speed to slip past Hornish Jr. and earn his second IndyCar Series win by 0.0121 seconds over Hornish Jr., marking the fourth-closest finish in series history thus far and the closest finish in Michigan International Speedway's history. Scheckter came in third, ahead of Sharp in fourth and Dixon in fifth. The final classified finishers were Takagi, de Ferran, Yasukawa, Unser Jr., Ray, Rice, Lazier, and Buhl. There were four cautions and 30 lead changes between six different drivers during the course of the race. The race's average speed of 180.917 mph (291.158 km/h) made it the fastest race in series history (at the time).

=== Post-race ===
Barron drove into victory lane to celebrate the win with his team; he earned $117,500 from his victory. In a press conference after the race, Barron hoped his victory would earn him more opportunities to race in the series, saying: "It's been a long season. But every time I've gotten the shot to drive, whether it's been with Roger Penske or Mo Nunn, the cars have been really strong. That's what I want to do when I go race. In my career since I moved up, I've done a lot of development programs. You know, when I go racing, I want to race competitively with a competitive car. I was fortunate enough to get that all four races this year. Hopefully, I continue to get the opportunity to do that." Barron received praise from Toyota Racing Development president Jim Aust, who regarded him as "the best kept secret in the sport." It was ultimately Barron and Mo Nunn Racing's final win in IndyCar Series competition. Second-place finisher Hornish Jr. looked at the race positively in spite of his narrow loss: "I'm as happy as I could be outside of winning with the fact that the new engine debuted as well as it did. We ran up front, led a lot of laps and gained a lot of points today. It's been a good day." Scheckter was similarly pleased with finishing third and complimented Hornish Jr. for racing him cleanly.

Despite facing several adversities, fourth-placed Sharp considered the race to be "a big day for the Delphi team" after finishing outside the top-ten in every race since his win in the Indy Japan 300. With all three Andretti Green Racing drivers suffering engine failures, team president Kim Green was left disappointed, but lauded the pit crews for providing their drivers with quick pit stops. Kanaan wasn't sure what caused his mechanical issue which kept him out of contention for the win: "We're not sure what happened. All of a sudden we lost a lot of speed. It's a shame. But, hey, Honda did a great job of giving me a fast engine, the whole Team 7-Eleven gave me great pit stops, and we had a great race up until then. Days like this will happen. We knew it could happen to us and today was the day. That's racing." Bräck said of his crash on lap 65: "We had some kind of problem, for sure, but I don't really know what happened. We had just come off a pit stop under caution. I went into the first turn on a restart and the car just understeered right up into the wall." Castroneves remained optimistic about his chances of winning the championship and aimed to earn as much points as possible before the season ended.

By finishing fifth, Dixon took the lead in the Drivers' Championship with 318 points, while Kanaan dropped to second in the standings with 317. De Ferran also fell to third, three points behind Dixon. Castroneves and Bräck rounded out the top-five with 295 and 257 points, respectively, as six races remained in the season. For the Manufacturers' Championship, Toyota maintained their lead on 94 points; Honda earned 72 points and stayed second, ahead of third-placed Chevrolet with 54 points.

=== Race classification ===
Pos.	No.	Driver	Team	Laps	Time/Retired	Grid	Points
1	21	(United States) Alex Barron	Mo Nunn Racing	200	2:12:39.4413	6	50
2	4	(United States) Sam Hornish Jr.	Panther Racing	200	+0.0121	4	42^{1}
3	10	(South Africa) Tomas Scheckter	Chip Ganassi Racing	200	+0.6686	1	35
4	8	(United States) Scott Sharp	Kelley Racing	200	+0.7108	10	32
5	9	(New Zealand) Scott Dixon	Chip Ganassi Racing	200	+2.3281	2	30
6	12	(Japan) Toranosuke Takagi	Mo Nunn Racing	200	+2.4371	11	28
7	6	(Brazil) Gil de Ferran	Team Penske	200	+2.8965	9	26
8	55	(United States) Roger Yasukawa	Fernández Racing	200	+8.7049	12	24
9	31	(United States) Al Unser Jr.	Kelley Racing	200	+33.4300	5	22
10	13	(United States) Greg Ray	Access Motorsports	199	+1 lap	7	20
11	52	(United States) Buddy Rice	Team Cheever	198	+2 laps	18	19
12	91	(United States) Buddy Lazier	Hemelgarn Racing	196	+4 laps	21	18
13	24	(United States) Robbie Buhl	Dreyer & Reinbold Racing	196	+4 laps	19	17
14	14	(United States) A. J. Foyt IV	A. J. Foyt Racing	179	Gearbox	16	16
15	23	(United States) Sarah Fisher	Dreyer & Reinbold Racing	167	Clutch	20	15
16	11	(Brazil) Tony Kanaan	Andretti Green Racing	160	Engine	15	14
17	3	(Brazil) Hélio Castroneves	Team Penske	70	Radiator	3	13
18	15	(Sweden) Kenny Bräck	Team Rahal	64	Contact	8	12
19	27	(United States) Bryan Herta	Andretti Green Racing	37	Electrical	14	11
20	26	(United Kingdom) Dan Wheldon	Andretti Green Racing	19	Engine	13	10
21	2	(Brazil) Vítor Meira	Team Menard	16	Fuel leak	17	9

Notes

- ^1 – Includes two bonus points for leading the most laps.

== Standings after the race ==
Drivers' Championship standings
	Pos.	Driver	Points
2	1	(New Zealand) Scott Dixon	318
1	2	(Brazil) Tony Kanaan	317 (–1)
1	3	(Brazil) Gil de Ferran	315 (–3)
	4	(Brazil) Hélio Castroneves	295 (–23)
	5	(Sweden) Kenny Bräck	257 (–61)

Manufacturers' Championship standings
Pos.	Manufacturer	Points
1	(Japan) Toyota	94
2	(Japan) Honda	72 (–22)
3	(United States) Chevrolet	54 (–40)

- Note: Only the top five positions are included for the Drivers' Championship standings.

Previous race: 2003 Firestone Indy 200	IndyCar Series; 2003 season	Next race: 2003 Emerson Indy 250
Previous race: 2002 Michigan Indy 400	Firestone Indy 400	Next race: 2004 Michigan Indy 400
