= Greg Ray =

American racing driver (born 1966)

- Born: Gregory Ray; August 3, 1966 (age 60) Dallas, Texas, U.S.
- Retired: 2004

Indy Racing League IndyCar Series
- Years active: 1997-2004
- Teams: Knapp Motorsports; A. J. Foyt Enterprises; Team Menard; Sam Schmidt Motorsports; Access Motorsports
- Starts: 73
- Wins: 5
- Poles: 14* (does not include Charlotte 1999)
- Fastest laps: 0
- Best finish: 1st in 1999

Previous series
- 1992-1994 1996: Toyota Atlantic; Indy Lights

Championship titles
- 1999: Indy Racing League Champion

Gregory Ray (born August 3, 1966) is an American former race car driver.

After winning the SCCA national Formula Atlantic championship in 1993, Ray moved up to the CART-sanctioned Toyota Atlantic series in 1994.

In 1997, Ray made his Indy Racing League debut driving for Thomas Knapp in an unsponsored black No. 97 car. He made his mark on the series a year later during qualifying for the 1998 Indianapolis 500. Driving the same, plain, black No. 97, he qualified second behind A. J. Foyt's driver Billy Boat. The car attracted sponsorship from local businesses and the national anti-tobacco campaign, and became known as Ash Kicker Racing. Though he failed to finish that race, he scored several good results in subsequent races and caught the eye of successful businessman and team owner John Menard Jr.

In 1999, Ray won the IRL championship on the strength of three victories. However, 2000 was a difficult season with only one victory. He qualified on pole for the Indianapolis 500 but subsequently finished last (33rd). In 2001, Ray and Menard had split, and his replacement Jaques Lazier won his first victory at the Chicagoland Speedway.

Things continued to go downhill from there, as Ray bounced around three separate cars in 2002 before starting his own team in 2003, Access Motorsports, the lone team utilizing a Panoz chassis with Honda engines. He gained sponsorship from TrimSpa but failed to light up the scoreboard and in 2004, he ran a few races before giving his seat to former Infiniti Pro Series champion Mark Taylor. The team closed at the end of the year from a lack of sponsorship.

Ray had five wins in his 74 IRL starts.

== Racing career ==
=== IndyCar career ===
==== Early years ====
Ray made his debut Indy Racing League start during the 1997 portion of the 1996-97 Indy Racing League season driving the No. 97 Thomas Knapp Motorsports Dallara-Oldsmobile Aurora in five of ten events including the Indianapolis 500 where he would finish 25th due to a water pump failure. Ray's best finish came at the True Value 500 at Texas Motor Speedway near Ray's hometown of Dallas, Texas to finish 29th place finish in points.

For 1998, Ray would continue to drive Knapp's No. 97 Dallara-Oldsmobile Aurora with sponsorship from Mercury Outboards and Mercury Marine for the opening rounds of the season. However, during practice for the Indianapolis 500 Knapp's team was without a sponsor. Ray would manage to qualify second between A. J. Foyt Enterprises teammates Billy Boat and Kenny Brack and would gain race day sponsorship from Justice Brothers, Inc., True Value, The Nashville Network, and Ray's hometown track Texas Motor Speedway. In the race, Ray led for eighteen laps before retiring on lap 167 due to a gearbox failure. Ray would follow up his 500 performance with a second place finish at the True Value 500 at Texas Motor Speedway where Ray acquired sponsorship from AT&T but Knapp's team skipped races due to a lack of sponsorship. Ray then drove a two-race stint for A. J. Foyt Enterprises in the No. 11 Conseco Dallara-Oldsmobile Aurora as a replacement to the injured Billy Boat (who beat Ray to the pole position at Indianapolis and the win at Texas) at the Pep Boys 400K at Dover Downs International Speedway where Ray would set the fastest lap before getting taken out in a crash and the VisionAire 500K at Lowe's Motor Speedway where Ray retired with gearbox failure. Knapp then reopened his team for the final three races of the season with sponsorship from Genoa Racing and Best Access Systems but would retire from each race.

==== Championship winner ====
Knapp's team then closed its doors for good due to a lack of sponsorship but Ray was signed on to drive the No. 2 Glidden/Menards Dallara-Oldsmobile Aurora and would take pole positions at the MCI WorldCom 200 at Phoenix International Raceway and the VisionAire 500K at Lowe's Motor Speedway (the latter of which was cancelled due to an accident that killed three spectators). Ray would retire from the first three races before getting three wins at Radisson 200 and Colorado Indy 200 Presented by Deloitte & Touche both at Pikes Peak International Raceway and the MBNA Mid-Atlantic 200 at Dover Downs International Speedway to get the championship (Ray's only time in the top-ten in points).

==== Downturn ====
For 2000, Ray would continue to drive for Menard in the No. 1 Conseco/Quaker State/Menards Dallara-Oldsmobile Aurora scoring six poles in the series' nine races including the Indianapolis 500 where during the IRL's split with CART Chip Ganassi Racing, a CART team, entered a pair of cars for CART drivers Juan Pablo Montoya and Jimmy Vasser with Montoya starting second to Ray. Because of this Ray and Montoya were the favorites to win. Ray would lead 26 of the first 66 laps before crashing on lap 67 and finishing in 33rd (last) place with Montoya leading 167 of the two-hundred laps on his way to an easy win. Ray would go on to win the Midas 500 Classic at Atlanta Motor Speedway. However, Ray would drop to thirteenth in points.

In 2001, Ray would continue to drive for Menard in the No. 2 Johns Manville/Menards Dallara-Oldsmobile Aurora. Ray continued to be an excellent qualifier with four poles in the series' first ten races but had trouble finishing races with a win at the zMax Atlanta 500 Classic at Atlanta Motor Speedway. Ray's relationship with Menard got even worse after the Indianapolis 500 where Ray qualified second and would lead forty laps before finishing seventeenth, eight laps down. Ray split from Menard after the Belterra Resort Indy 300 at Kentucky Speedway while Ray's replacement, Jaques Lazier won in his second race in the car at the Delphi Indy 300 at Chicagoland Speedway. Ray would drive the season ending Chevy 500 at Texas Motor Speedway returning to A. J. Foyt's team in the No. 11 A. J. Foyt Racing Dallara-Nissan Infiniti where Ray would start 13th and finish eighth in his only other top-ten of the year besides his Atlanta win.

Starting off 2002 without a ride, Ray was hired to drive the No. 11 Harrah's Dallara-Chevrolet for A. J. Foyt Enterprises in place of the injured Eliseo Salazar. Ray made his 2002 debut at the Indianapolis 500 starting 31st and crashing after 28 laps and finishing in 33rd, last, place again. Ray continued to drive Foyt's #11 (later #41 when Salazar returned) through the Gateway Indy 250 at Gateway International Speedway. Ray would then drive for Sam Schmidt Motorsports in the No. 20 Dallara-Chevrolet with sponsorship from Empress Casino and Young Chevrolet in the final two races of the season. Ray's best finish of 2002 was a 12th at the Boomtown 500 at Texas Motor Speedway in Foyt's No. 11 car. This led to a 23rd-place finish in points.

==== Fielding his own cars ====
Without a ride for 2003, Ray started his own team called Access Motorsports fielding Ray in the No. 13 Trim Spa Panoz G Force-Honda. The team started out strong with a ninth-place finish at the Indy Japan 300 at Twin Ring Motegi and followed that up with an eighth place finish at the Indianapolis 500. Ray would equal his eighth place finish at the Kansas Indy 300 at Kansas Speedway, the Emerson Indy 250 at Gateway International Speedway, and the Chevy 500 at Texas Motor Speedway. In addition, Ray would have fifth place qualifying efforts at the SunTrust Indy Challenge at Richmond International Raceway and the Belterra Casino Indy 300 at Kentucky Speedway. Ray would finish fifteenth in points despite missing three races.

In 2004, Ray looked to be in good shape after a respectable 2003 season. Ray acquired sponsorship from Renovac for the opening rounds on his No. 13 Panoz G Force-Honda and would have a second place start at the Indy Japan 300 at Twin Ring Motegi. But prior to the Indianapolis 500 the team was without sponsorship but Ray was able to get sponsorship from Rent-A-Center due to the company being based in Ray's home town of Plano, Texas. After Indianapolis Ray fielded his own cars without sponsorship at the Bombardier 500 at Texas Motor Speedway and the SunTrust Indy Challenge at Richmond International Raceway getting a seventh place finish at Texas. But soon a lack of sponsorship caught up to Ray as he had to withdraw from the following race, the Argent Mortgage Indy 300 at Kansas Speedway. Ray would quietly finish 23rd in points and the team closed up shop at the end of the season.

Ray soon afterwards retired from racing after being unable to find a drive for the 2005 season.

=== Other racing ===
==== SCCA career ====
Ray started off his career by driving in various divisions of the SCCA by first attending SCCA driving schools in September 1991. By 1992, Ray was competing in several SCCA-sanctioned Formula Ford 2000 series. In that season Ray had seven podium finishes and set a track record lap for a Formula Ford 2000 car at Sears Point Raceway and would take the series championship.

In 1993, Ray moved up to the Formula Atlantic series and would take the championship in series in dominating fashion.

==== CART career ====
In 1994, Ray moved to CART's version of the Atlantic championship, the Player's/ Toyota Atlantic Championship continuing to drive the same car he won the 1993 championship with. Ray would dominate this series also with wins at Phoenix International Raceway, Mosport International Raceway, and the Milwaukee Mile. Ray would have seven other podium finishes, six pole positions, and eight fastest laps with the championship.

By 1996, Ray was competing in the PPG/ Firestone Indy Lights Championship Powered by Buick driving for Team KOOL Green in the No. 27 KOOL Lola-Buick V6. Ray's best race of the season came at the race at the Milwaukee Mile where Ray started fourth and finished in second place. Ray would finish in twelfth place in the overall championship.

==== IROC career ====
After winning the 1999 Pep Boys Indy Racing League championship, Ray drove a Pontiac Firebird Trans Am, representing the Pep Boys Indy Racing League. Ray had a best finish of seventh at the race at Talladega Superspeedway and would also start second at the Indianapolis Motor Speedway race. Ray would finish in eleventh place in the championship.

== Video games ==
Ray has appeared as a playable driver in the racing games; Indy Racing 2000 and IndyCar Series 2005.

== Racing record ==
=== SCCA National Championship Runoffs ===
Year	Track	Car	Engine	Class	Finish	Start	Status
1993	Road Atlanta	Swift DB4	Toyota	Formula Atlantic	1	1	Running

=== American open–wheel racing results ===
(key) (Races in bold indicate pole position)

==== American Continental Championship results ====
Year	Entrant	1	2	3	4	5	6	7	8	Pos	Points
1992	Primus Racing	FIR; 3	MOS; 3	IOW; 2	WGI; 4	LRP; 2	TRR; 11	**SON1**; 1	SON2; 3	**1st**	**111**

==== Atlantic Championship ====
Year	Team	1	2	3	4	5	6	7	8	9	10	11	12	13	14	15	Rank	Points
1992		MIA	PIR	LBH	LRP	MTL	WGI	TOR	TRR	VAN	MOH	MOS	NAZ	LS1; 24	LS2; 15		**52nd**	**1**
1993	Genoa Racing	PIR	LBH	ROA	**MIL**; 16	MTL	MOS	HAL	TOR	NHS	TRR	VAN	MOH	NAZ	LS1	LS2	**52nd**	**1**
1994		**PIR**; 1	**LBH**; 14	**MOS**; 1	**MIL**; 1	MTL; 5	TOR; 10	TRR; 5	MOH; 3	VAN; 2	**NAZ**; 13	LS; 2					**3rd**	**148**

==== Indy Lights ====
Year	Team	1	2	3	4	5	6	7	8	9	10	11	12	Rank	Points
1996	Team Green	MIA; 7	LBH; 11	NAZ; 18	MIS; 15	MIL; 2	DET; 8	POR; 6	CLE; 10	TOR; 16	TRO; 6	VAN; 17	LS; 16	**12th**	**48**

==== IndyCar Series ====
Year	Team	No.	Chassis	Engine	1	2	3	4	5	6	7	8	9	10	11	12	13	14	15	16	Rank	Points	Ref
1996–1997	Knapp Motorsports	97	Dallara IR7	Oldsmobile Aurora V8	NHM	LVS	WDW	PHX	INDY; 25	TXS; 8	PPIR; 17		NH2; Wth	LV2; 30							29th	73	
1996–1997	Knapp Motorsports	31	Dallara IR7	Oldsmobile Aurora V8								CLT; 22									29th	73	
1998	Knapp Motorsports	97	Dallara IR8	Oldsmobile Aurora V8	WDW; 25	PHX; 11	INDY; 18	TXS; 2	NHM				ATL; 24	TX2; 21	LVS; 25						21st	128	
1998	A. J. Foyt Enterprises	11	Dallara IR8	Oldsmobile Aurora V8						DOV; 15	CLT; 17	PPIR									21st	128	
1999	Team Menard	2	Dallara IR9	Oldsmobile Aurora V8	WDW; 21	**PHX**; 21	**CLT**; C^{1}	INDY; 21	TXS; 2	**PPIR**; 1	ATL; 23	DOV; 1	**PPI2**; 1	LVS; 21	**TX2**; 3						1st	293	
2000	Team Menard	1	Dallara IR-00	Oldsmobile Aurora V8	**WDW**; 17	**PHX**; 19	LVS; 9	**INDY**; 33	TXS; 15	**PPIR**; 20	**ATL**; 1	KTY; 7	**TX2**; 26								13th	172	
2001	Team Menard	2	Dallara IR-01	Oldsmobile Aurora V8	**PHX**; 22	HMS; 21	**ATL**; 1	INDY; 17	TXS; 11	**PPIR**; 18	RIR; DNS	KAN; 14	**NSH**; 18	KTY; 13	STL	CHI					18th	193	
2001	A. J. Foyt Enterprises	11	Dallara IR-01	Infiniti VRH35ADE V8													TX2; 8				18th	193	
2002	A. J. Foyt Enterprises	11	Dallara IR-02	Chevrolet Indy V8	HMS	PHX	FON	NZR	INDY; 33	TXS; 12	PPIR; 18	RIR; 12	KAN; 19								23rd	128	
2002	A. J. Foyt Enterprises	41	Dallara IR-02	Chevrolet Indy V8										NSH; 20	MIS; 17	KTY; 25	STL; 19				23rd	128	
2002	Sam Schmidt Motorsports	20	Dallara IR-02	Chevrolet Indy V8														CHI; 17	TX2; 14		23rd	128	
2003	Access Motorsports	13	G-Force GF09	Honda HI3R V8	HMS	PHX	MOT; 9	INDY; 8	TXS; 11	PPIR; 18	RIR; 12	KAN; 8	NSH; 16	MIS; 10	STL; 8	KTY; 15	NZR; 17	CHI; DNS	FON; 14	TX2; 8	15th	253	
2004	Access Motorsports	13	G-Force GF09B	Honda HI4R V8	HMS; 14	PHX; 10	MOT; 20	INDY; 27	TXS; 7	RIR; 15	KAN	NSH	MIL	MIS	KTY	PPIR	NZR	CHI	FON	TX2	23rd	99	

^{1} The 1999 VisionAire 500K at Charlotte was cancelled after 79 laps due to spectator fatalities. Ray had qualified for the pole position.

==== Indianapolis 500 ====
Year	Chassis	Engine	Start	Finish	Team
1997	Dallara IR7	Oldsmobile Aurora V8	30	25	Knapp Motorsports
1998	Dallara IR8	Oldsmobile Aurora V8	2	18	Knapp Motorsports
1999	Dallara IR9	Oldsmobile Aurora V8	2	21	Team Menard
2000	Dallara IR-00	Oldsmobile Aurora V8	**1**	33	Team Menard
2001	Dallara IR-01	Oldsmobile Aurora V8	2	17	Team Menard
2002	Dallara IR-02	Chevrolet Indy V8	31	33	A. J. Foyt Enterprises
2003	G-Force GF09	Honda HI3R V8	14	8	Access Motorsports
2004	G-Force GF09B	Honda HI4R V8	27	27	Access Motorsports

Preceded by Kenny Bräck	Pep Boys Indy Racing League Champion; 1999	Succeeded by Buddy Lazier
