= TrimSpa =

Dietary supplement

TrimSpa was a dietary supplement designed for weight loss, marketed by the company Goen Technologies and headed by Alexander Szynalski. The ephedra-based supplement was marketed by TrimSpa to help "stave off hunger", until ephedra was banned from the United States. TrimSpa's parent company, Goen Technologies, filed for bankruptcy protection in May 2008.

== Company ==
TrimSpa started sales in 2001. After hiring spokeswoman Anna Nicole Smith, sales jumped to $43 million by 2004. Sales fell to $19.5 million by 2006.

In September 2008, it was decided by a judge to turn the case into Chapter 7 liquidation. At its peak, TrimSpa brought in $141 million in sales, with $17 million operating profits.

== Composition ==
TrimSpa's key ingredient was ephedra and caffeine. The government expressed health concerns, advising against the use of ephedra in 2003, causing the company to seek a new formula. The company changed its formula, making hoodia gordonii the prominent ingredient. The formula was rebranded as TrimSpa X32. In 2007, a class-action lawsuit came forward seeking an injunction against the company from advertising its formula as an effective weight loss product.

== Federal Trade Commission fine for false claims ==
On January 4, 2007, the U.S. Federal Trade Commission announced that the marketers of TrimSpa had agreed to pay a settlement of $1.5 million in response to an FTC complaint of making unsupported claims in advertisements and were prohibited "from making any claims about the health benefits, performance, efficacy, safety, or side effects of TrimSpa, Hoodia gordonii, or any dietary supplement, food, drug, or health-related service or program, unless the claims are true, not misleading, and substantiated by competent and reliable scientific evidence." The FTC also announced similar settlements with the marketers of Xenadrine EFX, CortiSlim, and One-A-Day WeightSmart.

== Over-the-counter disclaimer ==
The original TrimSpa and the new TrimSpa X32 are dietary supplements, regulated by the U.S. Food and Drug Administration (FDA). The FDA regulates dietary supplements under different rules than those governing prescription medicines and other over-the-counter products. Under these regulatory rules, TrimSpa products' safety and effectiveness are not reviewed by the FDA. Rather, TrimSpa's original parent company, Nutramerica Corp., and its original marketer and manufacturer, Goen Technologies Corp., were responsible for ensuring that their products were safe for public consumption. These same rules apply to the new owners.

== Celebrity endorsements ==
Anna Nicole Smith and Melissa D. Gordon were spokesmodels for the product.

TrimSpa was the primary sponsor for Greg Ray during the 2003 Indianapolis 500. Ray finished eighth, his career best finish in the 500.

== See also ==
- Anorectic
