= 1999 TransWorld Diversified Services Indy 200 =

(United States) 1999 Walt Disney World
Race details
- 1st round of the 1999 Indy Racing League season
- Date: January 24, 1999
- Official name: TransWorld Diversified Services Indy 200
- Location: Walt Disney World Speedway
- Course: Permanent racing facility 1.000 mi / 1.609 km
- Distance: 200 laps 200.000 mi / 321.869 km

Pole position
- Driver: (United States) Scott Sharp (Kelley Racing)
- Time: 21.007

Fastest lap
- Driver: (United States) Scott Sharp (Kelley Racing)
- Time: 21.671 (on lap 195 of 200)

Podium
- First: (United States) Eddie Cheever (Team Cheever)
- Second: (Canada) Scott Goodyear (Panther Racing)
- Third: (United States) Jeff Ward (ISM Racing)

The 1999 TransWorld Diversified Services Indy 200 was the first round of the 1999 Indy Racing League season. The race was held on January 24, 1999 at the 1.000 mi (1.609 km) Walt Disney World Speedway in Bay Lake, Florida.

== Report ==
Key	Meaning
R	Rookie
W	Past winner

=== Qualifying ===
Pos	No.	Name	Lap 1	Lap 2	Best (in mph)
1	8	(United States) Scott Sharp	21.222	21.007	171.371
2	2	(United States) Greg Ray	21.090	No time^{1}	170.697
3	30	(Brazil) Raul Boesel	21.195	21.152	170.197
4	4	(Canada) Scott Goodyear	21.419	21.210	169.731
5	14	(Sweden) Kenny Bräck	21.457	21.357	168.563
6	35	(United States) Jeff Ward	21.535	21.384	168.350
7	99	(United States) Sam Schmidt	21.478	21.413	168.122
8	91	(United States) Buddy Lazier	21.783	21.451	167.824
9	20	(United States) Tyce Carlson	21.454	21.505	167.801
10	28	(United States) Mark Dismore	21.479	21.466	167.707
11	12	(United States) Buzz Calkins W	21.602	21.525	167.247
12	50	(Colombia) Roberto Guerrero	21.548	No time^{1}	167.069
13	51	(United States) Eddie Cheever W	21.990	21.558	166.991
14	11	(United States) Billy Boat	21.767	21.591	166.736
15	5	(United States) Jason Leffler R	21.608	21.992	166.605
16	19	(United States) Stan Wattles	21.883	21.614	166.559
17	18	(United States) Steve Knapp	21.825	21.638	166.374
18	42	(United States) John Hollansworth Jr. R	21.994	21.650	166.282
19	10	(United States) John Paul Jr.	21.805	21.786	165.244
20	9	(United States) Davey Hamilton	22.222	21.808	165.077
21	81	(United States) Robby Unser	22.149	21.929	164.166
22	98	(United States) Donnie Beechler	21.952	22.014	163.994
23	22	(Brazil) Gualter Salles	22.633	22.145	162.565
24	33	(United States) Brian Tyler	22.356	22.302	161.421
25	7	(France) Stéphan Grégoire	22.699	22.344	161.117
26	44	(United States) Robbie Buhl^{2}	22.300	No time^{1}	161.435
27	3	(United States) Andy Michner	22.764	22.421	160.564
28	66	(United States) Scott Harrington R	22.712	22.542	159.702
Didn't qualify
29	6	(Chile) Eliseo Salazar	22.566	22.642	159.532

1. Restricted to just one qualifying lap after missing his original qualifying turn.
2. Changed to a backup car for the race. He was put in front of the two last qualifiers, as they were using provisionals.

==== Failed to qualify or withdrew ====
- (United States) Greg Gorden R for Truscelli Team Racing, initially named for the ride, the team decided to step him down for not having enough seat time in the car, as the new chassis came just days before a scheduled test. Replaced by (United States) Brian Tyler, who was due to drive for Team Pelfrey, where he was replaced by (United States) Robby Unser.
- Team Menard entered the #2 car, which remained vacant for the event. Before qualifying, they announced an agreement to surrender the number #3 to Brant Racing, which were due to use #31, because of "Brant's long business relationship" with Richard Childress. Greg Ray switched numbers from #3 to #2.
- The #77 Chastain Motorsports entry, which was vacant on the entry list, did not arrive at the track.

=== Race ===
Pos	No.	Driver	Team	Laps	Time/Retired	Grid	Laps Led	Points
1	51	(United States) Eddie Cheever W	Team Cheever	200	1:41:14.800	13	40	50
2	4	(Canada) Scott Goodyear	Panther Racing	200	+ 5.148 sec	4	36	40
3	35	(United States) Jeff Ward	ISM Racing	200	Running	6	0	35
4	8	(United States) Scott Sharp	Kelley Racing	200	Running	1	103	37
5	30	(Brazil) Raul Boesel	McCormack Motorsports	199	+ 1 lap	3	19	31
6	28	(United States) Mark Dismore	Kelley Racing	199	+ 1 lap	10	0	28
7	18	(United States) Steve Knapp	PDM Racing	198	+ 2 laps	17	0	26
8	9	(United States) Davey Hamilton	Galles Racing	198	+ 2 laps	20	0	24
9	11	(United States) Billy Boat	A. J. Foyt Enterprises	198	+ 2 laps	14	0	22
10	91	(United States) Buddy Lazier	Hemelgarn Racing	198	+ 2 laps	8	0	20
11	10	(United States) John Paul Jr.	Byrd-Cunningham Racing	197	+ 3 laps	19	0	19
12	20	(United States) Tyce Carlson	Blueprint-Immke Racing	197	+ 3 laps	9	2	18
13	50	(Colombia) Roberto Guerrero	Cobb Racing	197	+ 3 laps	12	0	17
14	33	(United States) Brian Tyler	Truscelli Team Racing	195	+ 5 laps	24	0	16
15	81	(United States) Robby Unser	Team Scandia	195	+ 5 laps	21	0	15
16	7	(France) Stéphan Grégoire	Dick Simon Racing	194	+ 6 laps	25	0	14
17	12	(United States) Buzz Calkins W	Bradley Motorsports	194	+ 6 laps	11	0	13
18	3	(United States) Andy Michner	Brant Racing	191	+ 9 laps	27	0	12
19	42	(United States) John Hollansworth Jr. R	TeamXtreme Racing	179	Accident	18	0	11
20	44	(United States) Robbie Buhl	Sinden Racing Services	175	+ 25 laps	26	0	10
21	2	(United States) Greg Ray	Team Menard	163	Gearbox	2	0	11
22	14	(Sweden) Kenny Bräck	A. J. Foyt Enterprises	106	Accident	5	0	8
23	22	(Brazil) Gualter Salles	Larry Curry Racing	91	Accident	23	0	7
24	19	(United States) Stan Wattles	Metro Racing Systems	54	+ 146 laps	16	0	6
25	66	(United States) Scott Harrington R	Harrington Motorsports	49	Engine	28	0	5
26	98	(United States) Donnie Beechler	Cahill Racing	15	Suspension	22	0	4
27	99	(United States) Sam Schmidt	Treadway Racing	14	Accident	7	0	3
28	5	(United States) Jason Leffler R	Treadway Racing	2	Accident	15	0	2

== Race Statistics ==
- Lead changes: 10 among 5 drivers

Lap Leaders
Laps	Leader
1-55	Scott Sharp
56-57	Tyce Carlson
58-102	Scott Sharp
103-110	Scott Goodyear
111-117	Raul Boesel
118-141	Scott Goodyear
142-173	Eddie Cheever
174-177	Scott Goodyear
178-180	Scott Sharp
181-192	Raul Boesel
193-200	Eddie Cheever

Cautions: 7 for 48 laps
Laps	Reason
3-9	Jason Leffler crash
15-21	Sam Schmidt crash
27-28	Donnie Beechler spin
53-60	Tow-in for Scott Harrington (engine issues)
108-119	Kenny Bräck and Gualter Salles crash
121-125	John Paul Jr. and Buddy Lazier crash
182-188	John Hollansworth Jr. crash

== Standings after the race ==
Drivers' Championship standings

Pos	Driver	Points
1	(United States) Eddie Cheever	50
2	(Canada) Scott Goodyear	40
3	(United States) Scott Sharp	37
4	(United States) Jeff Ward	35
5	(Brazil) Raul Boesel	31

- Note: Only the top five positions are included for the standings.
