= 2000 Indianapolis 500 =

American motor race

84th Indianapolis 500
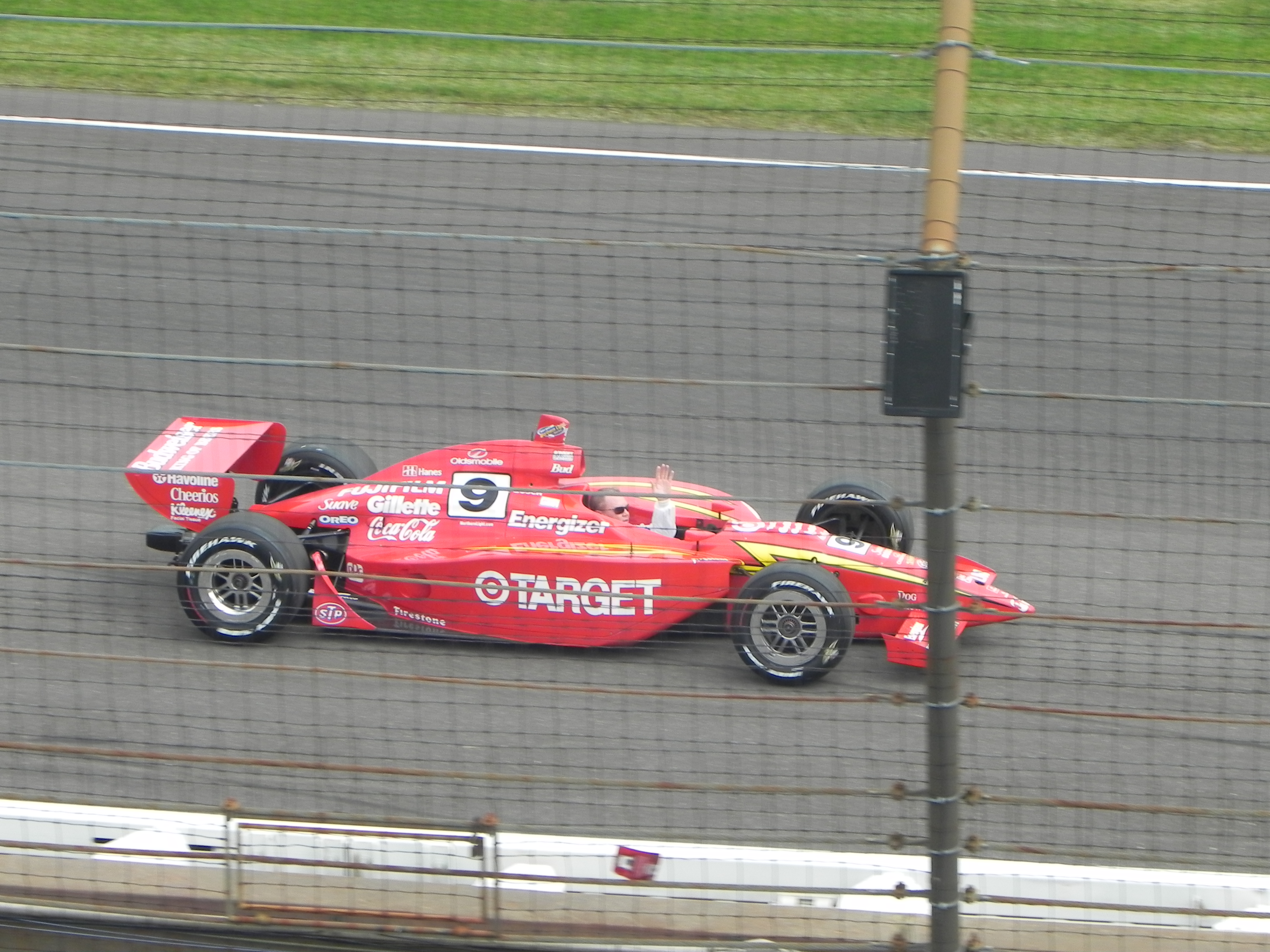

Indianapolis Motor Speedway

Indianapolis 500
- Sanctioning body: Indy Racing League
- Season: 2000 IRL season
- Date: May 28, 2000
- Winner: (Colombia) Juan Pablo Montoya
- Winning team: Chip Ganassi Racing
- Winning Chief Mechanic: Steve Gough
- Time of race: 2:58:59.431
- Average speed: 167.607 mph (269.737 km/h)
- Pole position: (United States) Greg Ray
- Pole speed: 223.471 mph (359.642 km/h)
- Fastest qualifier: (United States) Greg Ray
- Rookie of the Year: (Colombia) Juan Pablo Montoya
- Most laps led: (Colombia) Juan Pablo Montoya (167)

Pre-race ceremonies
- National anthem: Jessica Andrews
- "Back Home Again in Indiana": Jim Nabors
- Starting command: Mari George
- Pace car: Oldsmobile Aurora
- Pace car driver: Anthony Edwards
- Starter: Bryan Howard
- Honorary starter: Howard Katz (ABC Sports)
- Estimated attendance: 250,000 (estimated)

Television in the United States
- Network: ABC
- Announcers: Bob Jenkins, Tom Sneva, Arie Luyendyk
- Nielsen ratings: 5.5 / 15

Chronology
Previous	Next
1999	2001

The 84th Indianapolis 500 was held at the Indianapolis Motor Speedway in Speedway, Indiana on Sunday, May 28, 2000. The race was sanctioned by the Indy Racing League, and was part of the 2000 Indy Racing Northern Lights Series season. After four years of an ongoing organizational dispute and "split" in Indy car racing, Chip Ganassi Racing became the first major CART-based team to compete at the race since 1995. The Ganassi team of Jimmy Vasser and Juan Pablo Montoya competed as a one-off entry, and were well received by fans and fellow competitors. Both drivers were quickly up to speed with the IRL regulars, and were expected to be favorites in both qualifying and on race day. Also making a heralded return to Indianapolis was two-time winner Al Unser Jr. who had switched full-time to the IRL in 2000.

During qualifying, defending IRL champion Greg Ray took the pole position. However, on race day, reigning CART champion Juan Pablo Montoya dominated the race. Montoya led 167 laps, and cruised to victory, becoming the first rookie winner since Graham Hill in 1966. It was the first of two Indy victories for Montoya (2000, 2015). Buddy Lazier, the 1996 winner, and eventual season champion, finished second, his second runner-up finish at Indy, and fifth consecutive top ten.

The 2000 race was the first to feature two female starters in the field, Lyn St. James and Sarah Fisher. The start of the race was delayed over three hours due to rain. The green flag dropped at 2:10 p.m. EST, and the race was completed shortly after 5 p.m. Seven minutes after the checkered flag, the rain returned, and doused the victory lane celebration.

The first 65 laps of the race were run caution-free, a new Indy 500 record at the time. Montoya became only the fourth winner to complete the race in under three hours, and at 167.607 mph, it was the fastest Indy 500 since 1991. At the end of the season, Montoya promptly departed Indy car racing for Formula One, then went to NASCAR. He would not return for his second Indy start until 2014.

== Race schedule ==
Race schedule — April 2000
Sun	Mon	Tue	Wed	Thu	Fri	Sat
2	3	4	5	6	7 ROP	8 ROP
9 ROP/Testing	10; ROP/Testing	11; ROP/Testing	12; ROP/Testing	13	14	15
Race schedule — May 2000
7	8	9	10	11	12	13; Practice
14; Practice	15; Practice	16; Practice	17; Practice	18; Practice	19; Practice	20; Pole Day
21; Bump Day	22	23	24	25; Carb Day	26	27; Parade
28; Indy 500	29; Memorial Day	30	31			

Color	Notes
Green	Practice
Dark Blue	Time trials
Silver	Race day
Red	Rained out*
Blank	No track activity

* Includes days where track
activity was significantly
limited due to rain

ROP — denotes Rookie
Orientation Program

== Rule changes ==
During a yellow flag caution period, when the field is one lap away from going back to green flag conditions, the pace car would now drop off the track in turn one, and the race leader would pace the field back to the green flag and the ensuing restart. This was an effort to prevent any chance of the leader(s) accidentally passing the pace car on a restart (which happened to Scott Goodyear in the 1995 race).

A year later, this would be combined with the "wave around" rule.

== Time trials ==
Time trials were scheduled for two days in 2000, May 20–21. During practice, IRL regulars generally topped the speed charts, with different names leading nearly each day. Jimmy Vasser and Juan Pablo Montoya were quickly up to speed in the IRL machines, and each managed to lead one day of practice. Both were considered contenders for the front row. Greg Ray (223.948 mph) set the fastest lap of the week on "Fast Friday".

=== Pole day - Saturday May 20 ===
Pole qualifying began at 11 a.m. The weather was cool and cloudy. Al Unser Jr. (220.293 mph) was the first car in the field. At 12:07 p.m., Eliseo Salazar took over the top spot with a run of 223.231 mph. Salazar remained on top for over an hour, as most cars waved off, awaiting better conditions.

At 1:19 p.m., Juan Pablo Montoya took to the track. His run of 223.372 mph took over the provisional pole position. Greg Ray pulled his car out of line due to handling issues, and Team Menard announced that they were planning to wait until later in the day to make a qualifying attempt. Jimmy Vasser went out next, and at 221.976 mph, he was not able to join his Ganassi teammate on the front row.

Later in the afternoon, conditions improved slightly, and several cars returned to the track. At 3:49 p.m., Greg Ray completed his run at 223.471 mph, and secured the pole position. The front row of Ray, Montoya, and Salazar was separated by only 0.173 seconds, the closest such margin in Indy history. The front row shaped up such that the reigning champions of IRL (Ray) and CART (Montoya) would line up 1st–2nd.

A total of 23 cars qualified for the field. Lyn St. James wrecked on her first attempt, flipping the car up on its side in the south chute. Also into the wall were Jimmy Kite, Scott Harrington, rookie Memo Gidley and veteran Hideshi Matsuda. None of the drivers were seriously injured.

Sarah Fisher (220.237 mph) qualified 19th, becoming the third female driver in Indy history.

=== Bump day - Sunday May 21 ===
The second and final day of time trials opened with ten spots remaining. Raul Boesel was the first car out, and at 222.113 mph, he would be the fastest driver of the afternoon. After two wave-offs on Saturday, Billy Boat wrecked on his first attempt on Sunday. He would be forced to find a backup car.

The field was filled to 33 cars by 5:30 p.m.. Among the drivers who completed attempts were Jimmy Kite, Davey Hamilton, and popular hometown rookie Andy Hillenburg. Independent driver and co-owner Hillenburg was fielding a "throwback" entry named the Sumar Special, a gesture to the car driven by Pat O'Connor, which won the pole position in 1957.

Billy Boat secured a backup car with the Foyt team, but the car (#41, previously driven by Roberto Guerrero) only had one attempt left. After stalling three times trying to pull away, Boat's first two laps were fair. The car lost power on the third lap, and his speed dropped to 150 mph. It picked back up for the final lap, and he ran it at 198 mph. His four lap average was 192.105 mph, by far the slowest car in the field, and he was the first car on the bubble.

Lyn St. James and Dick Simon Racing reorganized after Saturday's crash, and she qualified comfortably. She bumped Boat's #41 car with 25 minutes left in the day. With less than a minute until the 6 o'clock gun, Billy Boat climbed into another Foyt backup, (#11) a car that had not been driven all week. Boat managed a run of 218.872 mph out of the unproven machine. He shockingly bumped his way into the field as time expired.

Davy Jones attempted a comeback after breaking his neck in 1997, but he was bumped.

== Carb Day ==
The final practice took place on Thursday May 25. All 33 cars took laps with Juan Pablo Montoya (218.257 mph) the fastest of the day. No major incidents were reported, though Scott Sharp suffered mechanical problems which delayed his arrival on pit lane. He managed to only take a few shake down laps in the final five minutes.

Jimmy Kite took laps in the car of Jason Leffler, as Leffler was in Charlotte for the day. Robby Gordon stayed for about an hour and twenty minutes, then he too departed for Charlotte.

=== Pit Stop Challenge ===
The 24th annual Coors Pit Stop Challenge was held Thursday May 25. Twelve teams competed in a single-elimination bracket. Nine teams earned berths based on winning the Coors Light Pit Performance Award at the Indy Racing League events since the previous year's Indianapolis 500. Two spots would be filled by a last-chance qualifying session on May 16. The final spot would be filled by the highest race qualifier not already in the contest. Al Unser Jr. (Galles) with a time of 9.42 seconds, along with Buddy Lazier (Hemelgarn) with a time of 13.48 seconds, advanced from the last-chance qualifying session. Juan Pablo Montoya (Ganassi), who qualified for the middle of the front row, secured the final berth.

The bracket was determined by a blind draw. Four teams received byes for the first round. Billy Boat, who actually qualified for the race in a Foyt back-up car, participated in the contest with his original entrant, Team Pelfrey. During the first round matches, Mark Dismore's crew was issued a 5-second penalty for improper handoff of an air gun, but he would have lost either way. Buddy Lazier was issued a 5-second penalty for a loose lug nut, but it did change the outcome. In the quarterfinals, Juan Pablo Montoya was disqualified for stalling the engine and not leaving the pits under power. During the semifinal match between race polesitter Greg Ray and Robby McGehee, Ray lost a wheel while exiting the pit stall. The finals pitted Panther versus Treadway, with the crew of Scott Goodyear defeating Robby McGehee. The Treadway crew was penalized 3 seconds for a tire rolling outside the pit stall. It was the second win in the event for Panther Racing.

First Round
5	Robby McGehee (Treadway Racing)	10.03
81	Billy Boat (Team Pelfrey)	13.37
1	Greg Ray (Team Menard)	10.62
14	Jeff Ward (Foyt Racing)	11.22
4	Scott Goodyear (Panther Racing)	10.28
28	Mark Dismore (Kelley Racing)	18.13
24	Robbie Buhl (Dreyer & Reinbold)	12.86
91	Buddy Lazier (Hemelgarn Racing)	18.86

Quarterfinals
5	Robby McGehee (Treadway Racing)	10.27
9	Juan Pablo Montoya (Chip Ganassi Racing)	no time
1	Greg Ray (Team Menard)	10.43
51	Eddie Cheever (Cheever Racing)	15.18
4	Scott Goodyear (Panther Racing)	9.99
3	Al Unser Jr. (Galles Racing)	11.90
8	Scott Sharp (Kelley Racing)	10.93
24	Robbie Buhl (Dreyer & Reinbold)	12.26

Semifinals
5	Robby McGehee (Treadway Racing)	9.49
1	Greg Ray (Team Menard)	16.04
4	Scott Goodyear (Panther Racing)	9.49
8	Scott Sharp (Kelley Racing)	10.11

Finals
4	Scott Goodyear (Panther Racing)	11.19
5	Robby McGehee (Treadway Racing)	12.73

== Starting grid ==
Fila	Inside	Middle	Outside
1	(United States) 1 - Greg Ray; Team Conseco/Quaker State/Menards; Team Menard; Dallara-Oldsmobile Aurora; 223.471 mph	(Colombia) 9 - Juan Pablo Montoya R Target; Chip Ganassi Racing; G-Force-Oldsmobile Aurora; 223.372 mph	(Chile) 11 - Eliseo Salazar; Rio; A. J. Foyt Racing; G-Force-Oldsmobile Aurora; 223.231 mph
2	(United States) 32 - Robby Gordon; Turtle Wax/Burger King/Moen/Johns Manville/Menards; Team Menard; Dallara-Oldsmobile Aurora; 222.885 mph	(United States) 8 - Scott Sharp; Delphi Automotive Systems/MCI Worldcom; Kelley Racing; Dallara-Oldsmobile Aurora; 222.810 mph	(United States) 14 - Jeff Ward; Harrah's; A. J. Foyt Racing; G-Force-Oldsmobile Aurora; 222.639 mph
3	(United States) 10 - Jimmy Vasser; Target; Chip Ganassi Racing; G-Force-Oldsmobile Aurora; 221.976 mph	(United States) 92 - Stan Wattles; Metro Racing; Hemelgarn Racing; Dallara-Oldsmobile Aurora; 221.508 mph	(United States) 24 - Robbie Buhl; Team Purex; Dreyer & Reinbold Racing; G-Force-Oldsmobile Aurora; 221.357 mph
4	(United States) 51 - Eddie Cheever Jr. W #51 Excite@Home Indy Race Car; Team Cheever; Dallara-Infiniti; 221.270 mph	(United States) 28 - Mark Dismore; OnStar/GM BuyPower/Bryant Heating & Cooling; Kelley Racing; Dallara-Oldsmobile Aurora; 220.970 mph	(United States) 5 - Robby McGehee; Meijer / Energizer Advanced Formula; Treadway Racing; G-Force-Oldsmobile Aurora; 220.611 mph
5	(Canada) 4 - Scott Goodyear; Pennzoil; Panther Racing; Dallara-Oldsmobile Aurora; 220.496 mph	(United States) 18 - Sam Hornish Jr. R Hornish Trucking / Advantage Powder Coating; PDM Racing; Dallara-Oldsmobile Aurora; 220.496 mph	(United States) 98 - Donnie Beechler Cahill Racing; Dallara-Oldsmobile Aurora; 220.482 mph
6	(United States) 91 - Buddy Lazier W Delta Faucet/Coors Light/Tae -Bo; Hemelgarn Racing; Dallara-Oldsmobile Aurora; 220.482 mph	(United States) 50 - Jason Leffler R United Auto Group Special; Treadway Racing; G-Force Oldsmobile; 220.417 mph	(United States) 3 - Al Unser Jr. W ECR / RacingTickets.com; Galles Racing; G-Force Oldsmobile Aurora; 220.293 mph
7	(United States) 15 - Sarah Fisher R Cummins; Walker Racing; Dallara-Oldsmobile Aurora; 220.237 mph	(France) 7 - Stéphan Grégoire; Mexmil/Tokheim/Viking Air Tools; Dick Simon Racing; G-Force Oldsmobile Aurora; 219.970 mph	(Brazil) 88 - Airton Daré R USACredit.com; Team Xtreme; G-Force-Oldsmobile Aurora; 219.970 mph
8	(United States) 12 - Buzz Calkins; Bradley Motorsports / Team CAN; Bradley Motorsports; Dallara-Oldsmobile Aurora; 219.862 mph	(United States) 75 - Richie Hearn; NetZero; Pagan Racing; Dallara-Oldsmobile Aurora; 219.816 mph	(Brazil) 55 - Raul Boesel; EPSON; Treadway Racing; G-Force-Oldsmobile Aurora; 222.113 mph
9	(United States) 27 - Jimmy Kite; Big Daddy's BBQ/Founders Bank; Blueprint Racing; G-Force-Oldsmobile Aurora; 220.718 mph	(United States) 33 - Jaques Lazier R Miles of Hope; Truscelli Team Racing; G-Force-Oldsmobile Aurora; 220.675 mph	(United States) 23 - Steve Knapp Dreyer & Reinbold Racing; G-Force-Nissan Infiniti; 220.290 mph
10	(United States) 16 - Davey Hamilton; FreeInternet.com; Team Xtreme; G-Force-Oldsmobile Aurora; 219.878 mph	(United States) 6 - Jeret Schroeder; Kroger; Tri Star Motorsports; Dallara-Oldsmobile Aurora; 219.322 mph	(United States) 22 - Johnny Unser; Delco-Remy/Microdigicom/Homier Tools; Indy Regency Racing; G-Force-Oldsmobile Aurora; 219.066 mph
11	(United States) 41 - Billy Boat; Harrah's; A. J. Foyt Racing; G-Force-Oldsmobile Aurora; 218.872 mph	(United States) 90 - Lyn St. James; Yellow Freight System; Dick Simon Racing; G-Force-Oldsmobile Aurora; 218.826 mph	(United States) 48 - Andy Hillenburg R The Sumar Special By Irwindale Speedway; Fast Track Racing; Dallara-Oldsmobile Aurora; 218.285 mph

=== Alternates ===
- First alternate: (United States) Dr. Jack Miller (#21) - Bumped
- Second alternate: (United States) Scott Harrington (#17) - Bumped

=== Failed to qualify ===
- (United States) Davy Jones (#40) - Bumped
- (United States) Robby Unser (#30) - Bumped
- (United States) Dan Drinan R (#48) - Waved off
- (Colombia) Roberto Guerrero (#41/20T) - Waved off
- (Canada) Doug Didero R (#43) - Wrecked qualifying
- (United States) Memo Gidley R (#82) - Wrecked qualifying
- (Japan) Hideshi Matsuda (#20) - Wrecked qualifying & practice
- (United States) Ronnie Johncox (#30) - Wrecked in practice
- (United States) Ross Cheever R (#52) - Entered and tested but did not make qualifying attempt
- (United Kingdom) Guy Smith R (44) - Entered and passed his rookie test, but did not attempt to qualify

== Race recap ==
=== Pre-race and rain delay ===
On Saturday May 27, the day before the Indy 500, Juan Pablo Montoya and Jimmy Vasser participated in the CART Bosch Spark Plug Grand Prix at Nazareth Speedway. The race had been scheduled for April 11, but snow postponed it until the Saturday of Memorial Day weekend. Montoya finished 4th, and Vasser 7th.

Jason Leffler, who qualified 17th at Indy, traveled to Charlotte on Saturday to participate in the NASCAR Busch Series Carquest Auto Parts 300. Leffler finished 21st at Charlotte. Also in Charlotte for part of the week was Robby Gordon, who was preparing to attempt the Indy 500/Coca-Cola 600 "Double Duty". Gordon required a provisional starting position for Charlotte, and he would line up 42nd. P. J. Jones was scheduled to stand by for Gordon at Charlotte if he could not make it in time for the start.

On race day, Sunday May 28, the morning dawned warm and sunny, but rain was in the forecast. At 10:07 a.m., rain started to fall, and the start of the race was delayed. After three brief periods of showers, at approximately 12:40 p.m., the rain stopped and held off just long enough to complete the race. Track-drying efforts began, and at 2:01 p.m. EST, Mari Hulman George gave the command to start engines, and the field pulled away. With the green flag at 2:10 p.m. EST, it was the latest in time of day start of an Indianapolis 500 in history until 2024, which started at 4:44 p.m. EDT (3:44 p.m. EST).

=== First half ===
At the start, polesitter Greg Ray took the lead. Juan Pablo Montoya settled into second, and Robby Gordon third. A fast pace over the first 20 laps saw Ray dominate, with Montoya aggressively dicing through traffic, holding a close second place.

On lap 27, the leaders went four-wide through traffic, and Montoya took the lead for the first time. There would only be 6 laps that he would not be in front for the rest of the race. A few laps later, all the leaders were into the pits for the first round of green flag pit stops. On lap 33 Montoya emerged with the lead, and began to flex some strength. His lead grew from 11.9 seconds on lap 34 to over 21 seconds on lap 55.

A blistering pace over the first 60 laps saw thus far zero yellow flags. The average speed at lap 60 (150 miles) was an all-time record 207.101 mph. Montoya held a 30-second lead over second place Jimmy Vasser. On lap 66, however, Greg Ray became caught up in a wind gust, and his car pushed into the outside wall exiting turn two. This resulted in the first caution of the day, setting a new modern era Indy record (66 laps) before the first yellow. Al Unser Jr. hit a piece of debris from Ray's crash and punctured his car's radiator, causing him to drop out 22 laps later.

Montoya now led Robby Gordon and Buddy Lazier. After the restart, however, Lyn St. James crashed into the outside wall in turn 1. Sarah Fisher was collected in the incident, and also crashed.

At the halfway point, Montoya still led. Vasser was second, about 5 seconds behind.

=== Second half ===
In the second half Juan Pablo Montoya continued to dominate. His teammate Jimmy Vasser, however, started to drop down the top ten. Buddy Lazier and Jeff Ward were now in the top three, all chasing Montoya.

On lap 143, Greg Ray returned to the track after lengthy repairs. His return did not last long, as he smacked the outside wall in turn two - close to the same place he crashed earlier - and he was finally out of the race. Ray became the fourth polesitter (Woodbury, Carter, and Guerrero) to finish last.

The green came back out on lap 150, with Montoya first and Lazier close behind in second. Rookie Sam Hornish Jr. crashed on lap 158, but most of the leaders did not pit. On the restart on lap 162, Lazier made a run for the lead in turn one, but Montoya held him off.

=== Finish ===
Stan Wattles brought out the final yellow flag on lap 174 for a blown engine. Montoya and Lazier pitted, which allowed Jimmy Vasser to take over the lead. The green came out with 23 laps to go.

Vasser's lead did not last long, as Montoya got by him on lap 180. Lazier caught up to Vasser and passed him for second. Lazier set the fastest lap of the race (218.494 mph) on lap 198, but Montoya was too far ahead. Montoya pulled away and won the Indianapolis 500 in his first start by 7.1839 seconds over 1996 winner Buddy Lazier.

== Box score ==
Finish	Start	No	Name	Qual	Chassis	Engine	Laps	Status	Entrant
1	2	9	(Colombia) Juan Pablo Montoya R	223.372	G-Force GF05	Oldsmobile	200	167.607 mph	Chip Ganassi Racing
2	16	91	(United States) Buddy Lazier W	220.480	Dallara IR-00	Oldsmobile	200	+7.184	Hemelgarn Racing
3	3	11	(Chile) Eliseo Salazar	223.231	G-Force GF05	Oldsmobile	200	+15.699	A. J. Foyt Enterprises
4	6	14	(United States) Jeff Ward	222.639	G-Force GF05	Oldsmobile	200	+18.398	A. J. Foyt Enterprises
5	10	51	(United States) Eddie Cheever W	221.269	Dallara IR-00	Infiniti	200	+18.718	Team Cheever
6	4	32	(United States) Robby Gordon	222.885	Dallara IR-00	Oldsmobile	200	+19.106	Team Menard
7	7	10	(United States) Jimmy Vasser	221.974	G-Force GF05	Oldsmobile	199	-1 Lap	Chip Ganassi Racing
8	20	7	(France) Stéphan Grégoire	219.969	G-Force GF05	Oldsmobile	199	-1 Lap	Dick Simon Racing
9	13	4	(Canada) Scott Goodyear	220.631	Dallara IR-00	Oldsmobile	199	-1 Lap	Panther Racing
10	5	8	(United States) Scott Sharp	222.808	Dallara IR-00	Oldsmobile	198	-2 Laps	Kelley Racing
11	11	28	(United States) Mark Dismore	220.968	Dallara IR-00	Oldsmobile	198	-2 Laps	Kelley Racing
12	15	98	(United States) Donnie Beechler	220.483	Dallara IR-00	Oldsmobile	198	-2 Laps	Cahill Racing
13	26	33	(United States) Jaques Lazier R	220.673	G-Force GF05	Oldsmobile	198	-2 Laps	Truscelli Racing Team
14	29	6	(United States) Jeret Schroeder	219.322	Dallara IR-00	Oldsmobile	198	-2 Laps	Tri-Star Motorsports
15	31	41	(United States) Billy Boat	218.872	G-Force GF05	Oldsmobile	198	-2 Laps	A. J. Foyt Enterprises
16	24	55	(Brazil) Raul Boesel	222.112	G-Force GF05	Oldsmobile	197	-3 Laps	Treadway-Vertex Cunningham Racing
17	17	50	(United States) Jason Leffler R	220.417	G-Force GF05	Oldsmobile	197	-3 Laps	Treadway Racing
18	22	12	(United States) Buzz Calkins	219.862	Dallara IR-00	Oldsmobile	194	-6 Laps	Bradley Motorsports
19	27	23	(United States) Steve Knapp	220.290	G-Force GF05	Infiniti	193	-7 Laps	Dreyer & Reinbold Racing
20	28	16	(United States) Davey Hamilton	219.879	G-Force GF05	Oldsmobile	188	-12 Laps	TeamXtreme
21	12	5	(United States) Robby McGehee	220.660	G-Force GF05	Oldsmobile	187	-13 Laps	Treadway Racing
22	30	22	(United States) Johnny Unser	219.068	G-Force GF05	Oldsmobile	186	-14 Laps	Indy Regency Racing
23	8	92	(United States) Stan Wattles	221.510	Dallara IR-00	Oldsmobile	172	Engine	Hemelgarn Racing
24	14	18	(United States) Sam Hornish Jr. R	220.495	Dallara IR-00	Oldsmobile	153	Accident	PDM Racing
25	21	88	(Brazil) Airton Daré R	219.969	G-Force GF05	Oldsmobile	126	Engine	TeamXtreme
26	9	24	(United States) Robbie Buhl	221.357	G-Force GF05	Oldsmobile	99	Engine	Dreyer & Reinbold Racing
27	23	75	(United States) Richie Hearn	219.815	Dallara IR-00	Oldsmobile	97	Electrical	Pagan Racing
28	33	48	(United States) Andy Hillenburg R	218.286	Dallara IR-00	Oldsmobile	91	Wheel Bearing	Fast Track Racing Enterprises
29	18	3	(United States) Al Unser Jr. W	220.292	G-Force GF05	Oldsmobile	89	Over Heating	Galles Racing
30	25	27	(United States) Jimmy Kite	220.717	G-Force GF05	Oldsmobile	74	Engine	Blueprint Racing
31	19	15	(United States) Sarah Fisher R	220.237	Dallara IR-00	Oldsmobile	71	Accident	Walker Racing
32	32	90	(United States) Lyn St. James	218.826	G-Force GF05	Oldsmobile	69	Accident	Dick Simon Racing
33	1	1	(United States) Greg Ray	223.471	Dallara IR-00	Oldsmobile	67	Accident	Team Menard

W Former Indianapolis 500 winner

R Indianapolis 500 Rookie

All entrants utilized Firestone tires.

=== Race statistics ===
Lap Leaders
Laps	Leader
1–26	Greg Ray
27–29	Juan Pablo Montoya
30	Jimmy Vasser
31–32	Robby McGehee
33–175	Juan Pablo Montoya
176–179	Jimmy Vasser
180–200	Juan Pablo Montoya

Total laps led
Driver	Laps
Juan Pablo Montoya	167
Greg Ray	26
Jimmy Vasser	5
Robby McGehee	2

Cautions: 7 for 39 laps
Laps	Reason
66–70	Greg Ray crash in turn 2
74–84	Lyn St. James, Sarah Fisher crash in turn 1
99–102	Robbie Buhl blown engine
127–130	Airton Daré blown engine
144–150	Greg Ray crash in turn 2
158–161	Sam Hornish Jr. crash in turn 2
174–177	Stan Wattles blown engine

== Legacy ==
After the 2000 CART season, Juan Pablo Montoya signed with the Williams Formula One team, and thus did not return to defend his Indianapolis 500 championship in 2001. Later, Montoya switched to the NASCAR Cup Series, and did not race again in the Indianapolis 500 until 2014. He has also raced in the U.S. Grand Prix, Brickyard 400, and Brickyard Grand Prix, all held at IMS. He won the 99th edition of the Indianapolis 500 in 2015.

The 2000 Indy 500 marked a turning point in the ongoing, five-year "split" between IRL and CART. While neither side was prepared to make concessions towards a unification or buyout, it became evident that sponsors in the CART series desired to have their teams participate in the Indianapolis 500 to benefit from the increased exposure. Ganassi's arrival, and subsequent domination of the event led other CART-based teams to follow suit. Penske Racing considered an entry for 2000, but decided against it due to lack of preparation time. Furthermore, at the time, they only owned Riley & Scott chassis, which were deemed uncompetitive. Instead, Roger Penske and Tim Cindric lent support to Jason Leffler's car at Treadway Racing. The following year additional teams (namely Penske and Team Green) returned to Indianapolis with competitive efforts. By 2004, nearly all of the major teams from CART/Champ Car had either entered singly at Indy, or defected completely to the Indy Racing League. Despite these moves, a formal unification would not take place until 2008.

CART-based Walker Racing also "crossed picket lines" to enter the 2000 race, but received little publicity for doing so. Noticeably neither of the team's full-time CART drivers (Bryan Herta and Shinji Nakano), were part of the effort. The attention for Walker was instead focused on their new driver, rookie Sarah Fisher, who would become a popular fixture in the IRL in the years to come.

=== Statistics ===
Juan Pablo Montoya won the race from the 2nd starting position. It was the first time a driver had won from the middle of the front row since Mario Andretti in 1969. From 1911 to 1969, the second starting position statistically produced the most race winners (ten total), more so than even the pole position (which had produced only seven winners at that time), a reflection of the Andretti curse. Montoya broke a thirty-year streak of losses by the second starting position, including many years where the no. 2 starter failed to even finish the race. As of 2024 the second starting position has not produced any additional race winners, a win–loss record of 1–54.

Second place finisher Buddy Lazier (the 1996 winner) was the only car towards the end of the race that was in striking distance of Montoya, but a combination of slower pit stops and difficulties in traffic, thwarted any chance of victory. It was Lazier's second runner-up finish in three years, and fifth straight finish in the top 7. Lazier, however, would go on to win the 2000 IRL championship.

Greg Ray (67 laps) fell just seven laps short of breaking Bill Homeier's record of 74 laps for the last place finisher.

With Goodyear announcing in October 1999 that it was leaving the sport of open wheel racing indefinitely, the Speedway lost one of its fixtures in 2000. The Goodyear Blimp had flown over the Indy 500 in most years from 1925 to 1999, but was absent in 2000, in what was believed to be the first time in decades.

== Broadcasting ==
=== Radio ===
The race was carried live on the Indy Racing Radio Network. Mike King served as chief announcer. The broadcast was moved into a brand new studio on the 9th floor of the newly completed Pagoda control tower. The race was heard on 549 affiliates. Due to the rain delay, the broadcast came on-air for one hour, then signed off to wait out the delay. Hourly updates were aired, then the broadcast came back to cover the pre-race ceremonies and race in its entirety.

Several minor changes were made to the crew. Ken Double worked his final 500 on the network. Mark Jaynes moved from the pits to take over the turn three location vacated by one-year member Kevin O'Neal. Larry Rice and Mike Lewis joined the crew as pit reporters. This would be Rice's only year on the network. Vince Welch, formerly a pit reporter, left the crew and eventually would join ABC television. This was the last year of the Statistician position. Starting on 2001 there were no more full field rundowns every 25 laps.

Bob Lamey who joined the crew in 1988, and had become a fixture in turn 4, would be on the crew for the final time in 2000. Guests interviewed in the broadcast booth included Secretary of Defense William Cohen, John F. Fielder (BorgWarner), David Seuss (Northern Light), Kevin Forbes (IMS), Mark Miller (Nokia), and Ira Kisver (Pennzoil).

Indy Racing Radio Network
Booth Announcers	Turn Reporters	Pit/garage reporters
Chief Announcer: Mike King; Driver expert: Johnny Rutherford; Statistician: Howdy Bell; Historian: Donald Davidson; Commentary: Chris Economaki	Turn 1: Jerry Baker; Turn 2: Ken Double; Turn 3: Mark Jaynes; Turn 4: Bob Lamey	Mike Lewis (north pits); Chris Denari (center pits); Larry Rice (south pits); Chuck Marlowe (garages)

=== Television ===
The race was carried live flag-to-flag coverage in the United States on ABC Sports. Al Michaels returned as host, with Bob Jenkins as announcer. Arie Luyendyk, who had announced his first retirement, joined the broadcast as analyst, alongside Tom Sneva.

After a one-year absence, Jack Arute returned as a pit reporter, and Leslie Gudel was added as a fourth pit reporter. Back in the ABC studios, Robin Roberts had a small role as Wide World of Sports studio host.

ABC Television
Booth Announcers	Pit/garage reporters
Host: Al Michaels; Announcer: Bob Jenkins; Color: Tom Sneva; Color: Arie Luyendyk	Jack Arute; Dr. Jerry Punch; Vince Welch; Leslie Gudel

== Notes ==
=== Works cited ===
- 2000 Indianapolis 500 Daily Trackside Report for the Media
- Indianapolis 500 History: Race & All-Time Stats - Official Site
- 2000 Indianapolis 500 Radio Broadcast, Indianapolis Motor Speedway Radio Network

1999 Indianapolis 500; Kenny Bräck	2000 Indianapolis 500; Juan Pablo Montoya	2001 Indianapolis 500; Hélio Castroneves
