= G-Force Technologies =

American racing car manufacturer

- Company type: Auto racing design and production
- Founded: 1991
- Founder: Chip Ganassi, Ken Anderson
- Defunct: 2004
- Fate: acquired by Élan Motorsport Technologies
- Headquarters: Braselton, Georgia, United States
- Website: www.gforceracing.net

G-Force Technologies (formerly Chip Ganassi Racing Ltd.) was an American racing car manufacturer originally formed by Americans Chip Ganassi and Ken Anderson in 1991.

== History ==
Ganassi would leave the company early on and the company was renamed G Force Precision Engineering. The company built successful cars in the Indy Racing League and 24 Hours of Le Mans. G-Force race cars won four Indianapolis 500s and two IRL Championships.

G-Force was purchased by Élan Motorsport Technologies in 2002 and all manufacturing was moved to Elan's facilities in Braselton, Georgia. Ken Anderson would leave to form Falcon Cars with Michael Kranefuss to build a competing chassis for the 2004 IRL season. Former Lola designer Simon Marshall would be brought on to design its new IRL chassis for 2003 which was branded the Panoz G-Force. During the winter of 2004, all remaining G-Force operations in England were moved to Braselton, and the England operations of G-Force were shut down. By the start of the 2005 season, the G-Force name was retired.

== 24 Hours of Le Mans ==
The Nissan R391 was a prototype racing car built by Nissan and their motorsports counterpart Nismo for competition at the 1999 24 Hours of Le Mans. It was a replacement for the R390 GT1, which was no longer legal in its production-based class.

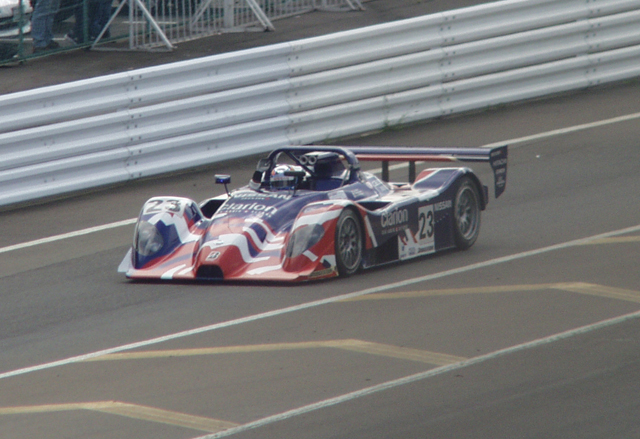
One of the Nissan R391s.

With major rule changes in the GT in 1999, major manufacturers were no longer able to build homologation specials which resembled prototypes more than true GT cars. Thus Mercedes-Benz, Toyota, Panoz, BMW, and Audi turned to the prototypes class, either using open cockpit prototypes or closed cockpit cars which were actually evolutions of their former GT cars. Nissan, believing that a purpose built prototype would be superior to an evolved GT car, decided to go the route of an open cockpit.

Nissan turned to the UK based firm G-Force Technologies to design and build the R391. Nigel Stroud would head up the car's design alongside Doug Skinner as the chief designer. Nissan also formed a partnership with longtime customer of its second hand sportscars, Courage Compétition. As part of a deal between the two, Nissan would give VRH35L 3.5L turbocharged V8 motors (left over from the R390 GT1) to Courage for use on their own prototype, while Nissan would in return gain expertise from Courage for use on the R391. Nissan would also buy a Courage C52 chassis to run under their own team in order to have reliability in case the R391s suffered from mechanical gremlins, with Le Mans being their first race.

For the R391, Nissan would decide to use a new version of the VH engine, opting to no longer use turbocharging as they had on the VRH35L. Instead, a modified naturally aspirated version would be constructed, named the VRH50A. At a larger 5.0 liters, the engine was able to overcome the loss of its turbocharging while still maintaining the benefits of the original VRH35L design.

== Indy Racing League/IndyCar ==
=== First Generation (G-Force GF01) ===
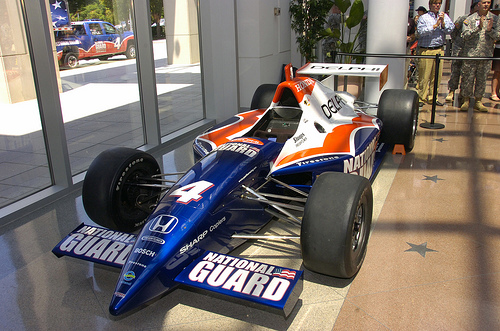
A 1997-spec G-Force IRL car. This car was repainted for promotional purposes in 2008.

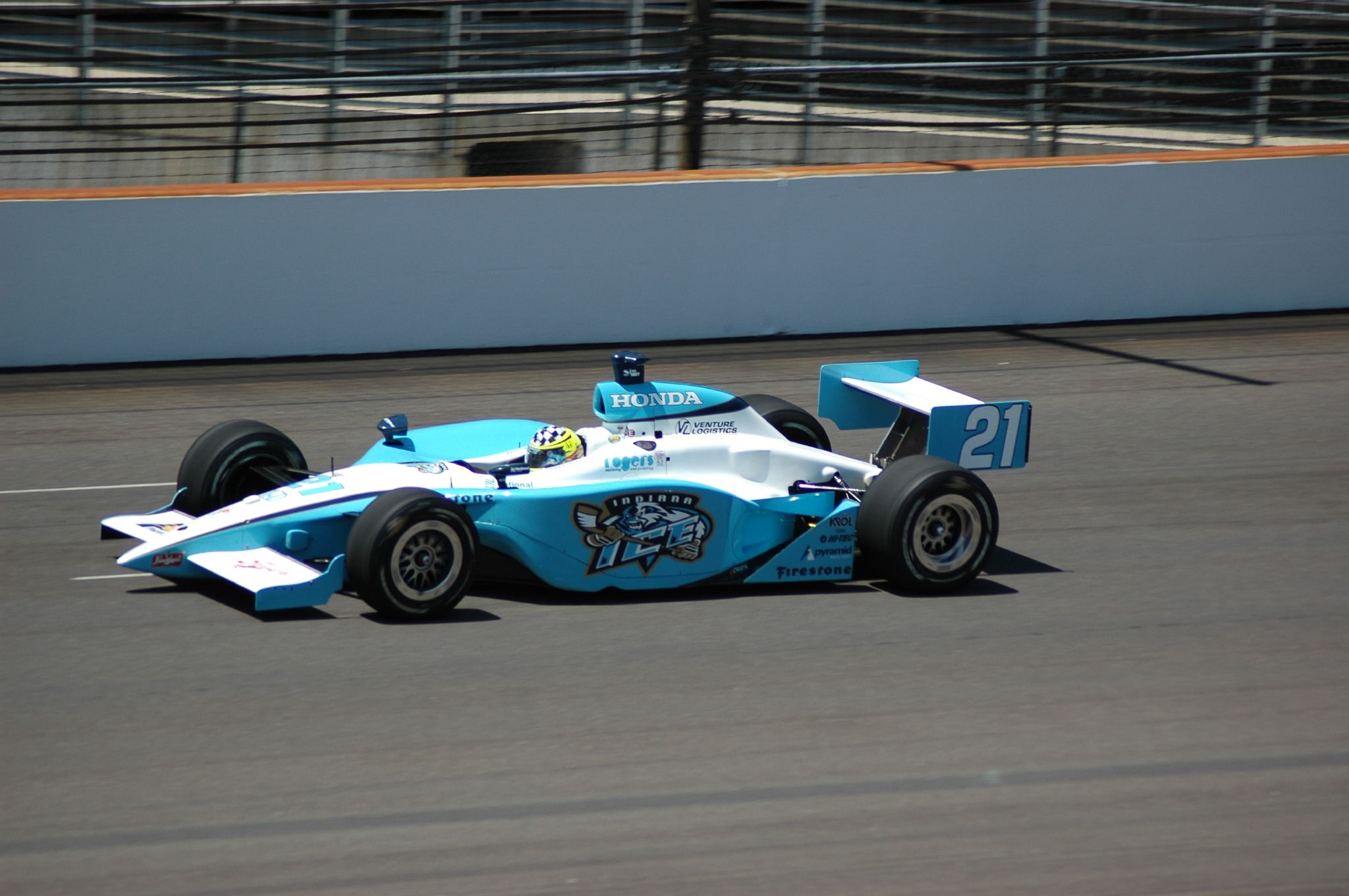
A GF09 driven at Indianapolis by Jaques Lazier in 2007

G-Force began constructing chassis for the Indy Racing League as one of their original chassis fabricators beginning with the 1997 season (others were Dallara and Riley & Scott). G-Force chassis won the Indianapolis 500 in its first attempt in 1997 with Treadway Racing's Arie Luyendyk, sweeping 1–2–3 finishing positions. The first generation G-Force IRL chassis competed in the series from 1997–1999.

In later years, the chassis saw continued use in the American Indycar Series.

=== Second Generation (G-Force GF05) ===
G-Force was once again a constructor for the second generation of IRL cars. G-Force would again visit victory lane in the Indianapolis 500 in 2000 with Chip Ganassi Racing's Juan Pablo Montoya. Élan purchased G-Force in 2002, and the production of the chassis was moved to Braselton for its final season. The second generation G-Force IRL chassis competed in the series from 2000–2002.

=== Third Generation (Panoz G-Force GF09/GF09B) ===
Following the 2002 purchase of G-Force, Élan Motorsport Technologies took over production of the third generation IRL chassis. The chassis, now branded as a "Panoz G-Force," was designed by former Lola designer Simon Marshall and began use during the 2003 season. The car was built in Braselton at the Élan facilities, with design/engineering done at G-Force's remaining operations in England.

The car saw early success winning the 2003 Indy 500 with Team Penske's Gil de Ferran and the 2004 Indy 500 with Rahal Letterman Racing's Buddy Rice. Beginning in 2005, the "G-Force" name was dropped in order to focus on the Panoz brand. All design and engineering operations were moved to Elan's facility in Braselton.

During the 2005 season, teams started to abandon the chassis (in favor of the Dallara) as it became increasingly unstable in traffic at Indy. By 2006, Rahal was the only team fielding the chassis full-time. The lack of use in turn caused Élan/Panoz to cease development and support. Focus shifted to their DP-01 program, further rendering the GF09 uncompetitive.

The GF09 competed for the final time at the 2007 Indy 500 with two small teams, Playa Del Racing and Chastain Motorsports. American Dream Motorsports entered a Panoz GF09 in the 2008 Indy 500 for Phil Giebler, but he crashed in practice. In December 2008, Panoz announced their withdrawal from the IndyCar Series due to Panoz focusing on their sports car program.

==== Specifications ====
- Chassis: Carbon-fiber monocoque
- Airbox shape: Triangle
- Length: 193 in (4,902 mm)
- Height: 37.5 in (952 mm) (excluding roll hoop or camera mount).
- Width: 77.5 to 78.5 in (1,968 to 1,994 mm) (measured outside rim to rim).
- Gearbox: XTRAC #295 gearbox (gears forward of rear axle) Six forward gears, Mega-Line Assisted Gear Shift (paddle-shift).
- Suspension: Pushrod with multilink.
- Engine: Honda Indy V8, 3498 cc, Normally aspirated.
- Fuel: Ethanol.
- Tires: Firestone Firehawk.
