= Yellow flag =

Yellow flag may refer to:

- Iris pseudacorus, an aquatic flowering plant
- A flag of a yellow colour:
  - Yellow flag (contagion), historically displayed on ships to indicate the presence of disease or quarantine (obsolete); also used in some cities to mark a recent death in a neighborhood, regardless of cause
  - Racing flags, used in motor sports to indicate hazardous conditions
  - Penalty flag, used in various sports including American football
  - Yellow Flag Line, transport on the Chao Phraya River, with service indicated by the flag color
  - Yellow Dragon Flag, the flag of the Qing dynasty
  - Yellow Jack (flag), the signal flag that represents the letter Q
  - A political flag used to represent liberalism or capitalism (cf. red flag, black flag)
- The Yellow Flag, 1937 German drama film
- Yellow Banners of the Eight Banner system
  - Plain Yellow Banner
  - Bordered Yellow Banner
