= Team Menard =

IndyCar Series team

- Owner: John Menard Jr.
- Base: Indianapolis, Indiana
- Series: NASCAR Cup Series; NASCAR Craftsman Truck Series; CART PPG IndyCar World Series; Indy Racing League
- Manufacturer: Ford
- Opened: 1999 (NASCAR); 1980 (CART)
- Closed: 2001 (NASCAR); 2004 (IRL)

Career
- Drivers' Championships: 2 (1996–97, 1999 IRL)
- Race victories: 10

Team Menard was an auto racing team that competed in the Indianapolis 500, CART, Indy Racing League, NASCAR Cup Series, and NASCAR Craftsman Truck Series. The team was owned by Menards founder, John Menard Jr. Founded in 1980 to compete in CART, from 1991 to 1996 they modified their own Buick V6 engines for racing. This combination won pole for the 500 with Scott Brayton in 1995 and 1996; Tony Stewart used this combination for the first part of his 1996–97 IRL Championship. With more stringent regulations, the team continued to shine, winning the 1999 championship with Greg Ray. However, with the influx of former CART teams to the IRL in the early 2000s, Team Menard struggled to compete for wins and the team merged in 2004 with Panther Racing, although their car continued to carry Menard's colors and be driven first by Mark Taylor, who was then replaced by Townsend Bell. In 2005, Menard's was an associate sponsor for another team and the former Menard No. 2 car driven by Tomáš Enge carried no identification to its Menard lineage. For 2006, the No. 2 car was dropped by Panther and all vestiges of the once dominant Team Menard lineage disappeared until the spring of 2008 when Menards became a primary sponsor on the No. 20 Vision Racing Dallara driven by Ed Carpenter in the IndyCar Series.

The Team Menard name has also been used to refer to their sponsoring of various drivers throughout motorsports, including Paul Menard, Ryan Blaney, Austin Cindric, Brandon Jones and Matt Crafton in NASCAR, Simon Pagenaud in IndyCar and Frank Kimmel in ARCA, while TeamMenard.com was a portal to information on these drivers and their sponsor. However, Team Menard is not the name of any of their race teams and none of those cars are owned by John Menard. The URL currently redirects to the Menards home page.

Menard also had a NASCAR team running the No. 13 car. Robby Gordon ran 17 races in 2000, with P.J. Jones running an additional race.

== Drivers ==
=== CART (1980–1995) ===
- (United States) Herm Johnson (1980–1986)
- (United Kingdom) Jim Crawford (1990)
- (United States) Gary Bettenhausen (1990–1993)
- (United States) Kevin Cogan (1991)
- (United States) Tom Sneva (1991–1992)
- (United States) Al Unser (1992)
- (Brazil) Nelson Piquet (1993)
- (United States) Eddie Cheever (1993, 1994)
- (Australia) Geoff Brabham (1993–1994)
- (United States) Scott Brayton (1994–1995)
- (United States) Buddy Lazier (1995)
- (Netherlands) Arie Luyendyk (1995)

=== IRL/IndyCar Series (1996–2003) ===
- (United States) Scott Brayton (1996)
- (United States) Eddie Cheever (1996)
- (United States) Danny Ongais (1996)
- (United States) Mark Dismore (1996–1997, 2002)
- (United States) Tony Stewart (1996–1998)
- (United States) Robbie Buhl (1997–1998)
- (United States) Robby Gordon (1999–2000, 2002)
- (United States) Greg Ray (1999–2001)
- (United States) Jaques Lazier (2001–2003)
- (Brazil) Raul Boesel (2002)
- (Brazil) Vítor Meira (2002–2003)
- (United States) P. J. Jones (2002)
- (United States) Richie Hearn (2003)

=== NASCAR Cup Series ===
- (United States) Robby Gordon (2000)
- (United States) P.J. Jones (2000)

=== NASCAR Craftsman Truck Series (2000–2001) ===
- (United States) Bryan Reffner (2000–2001)
- (United States) David Starr (2001)

== Complete racing results ==
=== PPG CART Indycar World Series results ===
(key)

Year	Chassis	Engine	Tyres	Drivers	No.	1	2	3	4	5	6	7	8	9	10	11	12	13	14	15	16	17
1980						ONT	INDY	MIL	POC	MDO	MCH	WGL	MIL	ONT	MCH	MXC	PHX					
1980	Lightning Mk 1/77	Offy Drake L4t	G	(United States) Herm Johnson	28	14	DNQ	17	11				11	13	13	14	8					
1981						PHX	MIL	ATL		MCH	RIV	MIL	MCH	WGL	MXC	PHX						
1981	Lightning Mk 1/77	Chevrolet V8	G	(United States) Herm Johnson	28		22	22	17	33	7	13										
1981	Eagle 81	Chevrolet V8	G	(United States) Herm Johnson	28									9	8	9						
1982						PHX	ATL	MIL	CLE	MCH	MIL	POC	RIV	ROA	MCH	PHX						
1982	Eagle 81	Chevrolet V8	G	(United States) Herm Johnson	28	19	6	23	13	34	16		22	17								
1983						ATL	INDY	MIL	CLE	MCH	ROA	POC	RIV	MDO	MCH	CPL	LAG	PHX				
1983	Eagle 81	Chevrolet V8	G	(United States) Herm Johnson	27						DNQ											
1984						LBH	PHX	INDY	MIL	POR	MEA	CLE	MCH	ROA	POC	MDO	SAN	MCH	PHX	LAG	CPL	
1984	March 84C	Cosworth DFX V8t	G	(United States) Herm Johnson	28			8	18													
1985						LBH	INDY	MIL	POR	MEA	CLE	MCH	ROA	POC	MDO	SAN	MCH	LAG	PHX	MIA		
1985	March 85C	Cosworth DFX V8t	G	(United States) Herm Johnson	8		DNQ															
1986						PHX	LBH	INDY	MIL	POR	MEA	CLE	TOR	MCH	POC	MDO	SAN	MCH	ROA	LAG	PHX	MIA
1986	March 86C	Cosworth DFX V8t	G	(United States) Herm Johnson	28			DNQ														
1986	March 86C	Cosworth DFX V8t	G	(Republic of Ireland) Derek Daly	28			DNQ														
1989						PHX	LBH	INDY	MIL	DET	POR	CLE	MEA	TOR	MCH	POC	MDO	ROA	NAZ	LAG		
1989	Lola T89/00	Cosworth DFX V8t	G	(United States) Johnny Rutherford	98			DNQ														
1990						PHX	LBH	INDY	MIL	DET	POR	CLE	MEA	TOR	MCH	DEN	VAN	MDO	ROA	NAZ	LAG	
1990	Lola T89/00	Buick 3300 V6t	G	(United Kingdom) Jim Crawford	15			15														
1990	Lola T89/00	Buick 3300 V6t	G	(United Kingdom) Jim Crawford	51	19																
1990	Lola T89/00	Buick 3300 V6t	G	(United States) Gary Bettenhausen	51			31														
1990	Lola T89/00	Buick 3300 V6t	G	(United States) Steve Barclay	51			DNQ														
1991						SFR	LBH	PHX	INDY	MIL	DET	POR	CLE	MEA	TOR	MCH	DEN	VAN	MDO	ROA	NAZ	LAG
1991	Lola T91/00	Buick 3300 V6t	G	(United States) Gary Bettenhausen	51				22													
1991	Lola T91/00	Buick 3300 V6t	G	(United States) Kevin Cogan	9				29													
1991	Lola T89/00	Buick 3300 V6t	G	(United States) Tom Sneva	59				DNQ													
1992						SFR	PHX	LBH	INDY	DET	POR	MIL	NHA	TOR	MCH	CLE	ROA	VAN	MDO	NAZ	LAG	
1992	Lola T92/00	Buick 3300 V6t	G	(United States) Al Unser	27				3													
1992	Lola T92/00	Buick 3300 V6t	G	(Brazil) Nelson Piquet	27				DNQ													
1992	Lola T92/00	Buick 3300 V6t	G	(United States) Gary Bettenhausen	51				17													
1992	Lola T91/00	Buick 3300 V6t	G	(United States) Tom Sneva	59				31													
1992	Lola T91/00	Buick 3300 V6t	G	(United States) Rocky Moran	59				DNQ													
1993						SFR	PHX	LBH	INDY	MIL	DET	POR	CLE	TOR	MCH	NHA	ROA	VAN	MDO	NAZ	LAG	
1993	Lola T93/00	Menard V6t	G	(Australia) Geoff Brabham	27				26													
1993	Lola T93/00	Menard V6t	G	(United States) Gary Bettenhausen	51				17													
1993	Lola T93/00	Menard V6t	G	(Brazil) Nelson Piquet **(R)**	77				32													
1993	Lola T92/00	Buick 3300 V6t	G	(United States) Eddie Cheever	59				16													
1994						SFR	PHX	LBH	INDY	MIL	DET	POR	CLE	TOR	MCH	MDO	NHA	VAN	ROA	NAZ	LAG	
1994	Lola T93/00	Menard V6t	G	(United States) Eddie Cheever	27				8													
1994	Lola T93/00	Menard V6t	G	(United States) Scott Brayton	59				20													
1994	Lola T93/00	Menard V6t	G	(Australia) Geoff Brabham	59				DNQ													
1995						MIA	SFR	PHX	LBH	NAZ	INDY	MIL	DET	POR	ROA	TOR	CLE	MCH	MDO	NHA	VAN	LAG
1995	Lola T95/00	Menard V6t	G	(Netherlands) Arie Luyendyk	40						7											
1995	Lola T95/00	Menard V6t	G	(United States) Scott Brayton	60						**17**											
1995	Lola T95/00	Menard V6t	G	(United States) Buddy Lazier	80						27											

=== IRL IndyCar Series results ===
(key) (Results in bold indicate pole position; results in italics indicate fastest lap)

Year	Chassis	Engine	Tyres	Drivers	No.	1	2	3	4	5	6	7	8	9	10	11	12	13	14	15	16
1996						WDW	PHX	INDY													
1996	Lola T95/00	Menard V6t	**G** **F**	(United States) Scott Brayton	2	15	18	**DNS**													
1996	Lola T95/00	Menard V6t	**G** **F**	(United States) Eddie Cheever	3	10	Wth	11													
1996	Lola T95/00	Menard V6t	**G** **F**	(United States) Tony Stewart	20	2	11	24													
1996	Lola T95/00	Menard V6t	**F**	(United States) Mark Dismore	30			19													
1996	Lola T95/00	Menard V6t	**F**	(United States) Danny Ongais	32			7													
1996–97						NHA	LSV	WDW	PHX	INDY	TXS	PPIR	CLT	NHA	LSV						
1996–97	Lola T95/00	Menard V6t	**F**	(United States) Mark Dismore	3	20	17														
1996–97	Lola T95/00	Menard V6t	**F**	(United States) Tony Stewart	2	12*	21														
1996–97	G-Force GF01	Oldsmobile Aurora V8	**F**	(United States) Tony Stewart	2			**10***	**2***	5*	**5***	1*	**7***	14	11						
1996–97	G-Force GF01	Oldsmobile Aurora V8	**F**	(United States) Robbie Buhl	3				18	8	16			1	3						
1998						WDW	PHX	INDY	TXS	NHA	DOV	CLT	PPIR	ATL	TXS	LSV					
1998	Dallara IR8	Oldsmobile Aurora V8	**F**	(United States) Tony Stewart	1			33	**14**	1*			3		20*	14					
1998	G-Force GF01B	Oldsmobile Aurora V8	**F**	(United States) Tony Stewart	1	**1***	2*				**8**	**21**		5							
1998	G-Force GF01B	Oldsmobile Aurora V8	**F**	(United States) Robbie Buhl	3	20								11							
1998	Dallara IR8	Oldsmobile Aurora V8	**F**	(United States) Robbie Buhl	3		12	31	6	10			2		7	7					
1999			**F**			WDW	PHX	CLT	INDY	TXS	PPIR	ATL	DOV	PPIR	LSV	TXS					
1999	Dallara IR9	Oldsmobile Aurora V8	**F**	(United States) Greg Ray	2	21	**21**	C^{1}	21	2*	**1***	23	1	**1***	21	**3**					
1999	Dallara IR9	Oldsmobile Aurora V8	**F**	(United States) Robby Gordon	32				4												
2000						WDW	PHX	LSV	INDY	TXS	PPIR	ATL	KTY	TXS							
2000	Dallara IR-00	Oldsmobile Aurora V8	**F**	(United States) Greg Ray	1	**17**	**19**	9	**33**	15	**20**	**1***	7	**26**							
2000	Dallara IR-00	Oldsmobile Aurora V8	**F**	(United States) Robby Gordon	32				6												
2001						PHX	HMS	ATL	INDY	TXS	PPIR	RIR	KAN	NSH	KTY	GAT	CHI	TXS			
2001	Dallara IR-01	Oldsmobile Aurora V8	**F**	(United States) Greg Ray	2	**22**	21	**1***	17	11*	**18**	DNS	14	**18**	13						
2001	Dallara IR-01	Oldsmobile Aurora V8	**F**	(United States) Jaques Lazier	2											16	**1***	20			
2002						HMS	PHX	FON	NAZ	INDY	TXS	PPIR	RIR	KAN	NSH	MCH	KTY	GAT	CHI	TXS	
2002	Dallara IR-02	Chevrolet Indy V8	**F**	(United States) Jaques Lazier	2	18	6	2	20												
2002	Dallara IR-02	Chevrolet Indy V8	**F**	(United States) P. J. Jones	2					DNQ											
2002	Dallara IR-02	Chevrolet Indy V8	**F**	(Brazil) Raul Boesel	2					21	13										
2002	Dallara IR-02	Chevrolet Indy V8	**F**	(United States) Mark Dismore	2							11	11	20	18	18					
2002	Dallara IR-02	Chevrolet Indy V8	**F**	(Brazil) Vítor Meira	2												15	9	8	**3**	
2002	Dallara IR-02	Chevrolet Indy V8	**F**	(United States) Robby Gordon	31					8											
2003						HMS	PHX	MOT	INDY	TXS	PPIR	RIR	KAN	NSH	MCH	GAT	KTY	NAZ	CHI	FON	TXS
2003	Dallara IR-03	Chevrolet Indy V8	**F**	(United States) Jaques Lazier	2	20	6	12	29									DNS			
2003	Dallara IR-03	Chevrolet Indy V8	**F**	(United States) Richie Hearn	2														**14**		
2003	Dallara IR-03	Chevrolet Indy V8	**F**	(Brazil) Vítor Meira	2					12	16	22	20	19	21	9	DNS			11	4
2003	Dallara IR-03	Chevrolet Indy V8	**F**	(Brazil) Vítor Meira	22				12												
Sources:

1. The 1999 VisionAire 500K at Charlotte was cancelled after 79 laps due to spectator fatalities.

=== NASCAR series ===
==== Nascar Cup Series ====
Year	Driver	No.	Make	1	2	3	4	5	6	7	8	9	10	11	12	13	14	15	16	17	18	19	20	21	22	23	24	25	26	27	28	29	30	31	32	33	34	Owners	Pts
2000	Robby Gordon	13	Ford	DAY; 18	CAR; 38	LVS; 13	ATL; DNQ	DAR; 28	BRI; 32	TEX; DNQ	MAR; 40	TAL; 37	CAL; 31	RCH; 37		DOV	MCH; 28	POC	SON; 9	DAY; DNQ	NHA	POC	IND; DNQ	GLN; 4	MCH; 34	BRI; 31	DAR	RCH; DNQ	NHA	DOV	MAR	CLT; 38	TAL	CAR; 41	PHO; DNQ	HOM	ATL; 27	43rd	1517
2000	P. J. Jones	13	Ford												CLT; 35																							43rd	1517

==== NASCAR Craftsman Truck Series ====
Year	Driver	No.	Make	1	2	3	4	5	6	7	8	9	10	11	12	13	14	15	16	17	18	19	20	21	22	23	24	Owners	Pts
2000	Bryan Reffner	3	Chevy	DAY; 35	HOM; 30	PHO; 11	MMR; 6	MAR; 8	PIR; 7	GTY; 8	MEM; 8	PPR; 8	EVG; 10	TEX; 5	**KEN**; 5	GLN; 13	MLW; 10	NHA; 28	NZH; 9	MCH; 15	IRP; 8	NSV; 8	CIC; 7	RCH; 11	DOV; 29	**TEX**; 1	CAL; 6	9th	3153
2001	Bryan Reffner	3	Chevy	DAY; 8	HOM; 28	MMR; 18	MAR; 8	GTY	DAR	PPR	DOV																	?	1023
2001	David Starr	3	Chevy									TEX; 3	MEM	MLW	KAN	KEN	NHA	IRP	NSH	CIC	NZH	RCH	SBO	TEX; 4	LVS; 7	PHO	CAL; 5	?	1023
