= 2002 Firestone Indy 200 =

IRL motor race held in Lebanon, Tennessee

(United States) 2002 Firestone Indy 200
Race details
- Race 10 of 15 in the 2002 Indy Racing League season
- Layout of Nashville Superspeedway
- Date: July 20, 2002
- Official name: Firestone Indy 200
- Location: Nashville Superspeedway, Lebanon, Tennessee
- Course: Permanent racing facility 1.330 mi / 2.140 km
- Distance: 200 laps 266.000 mi / 428.086 km
- Weather: Partly cloudy, humid

Pole position
- Driver: (United States) Billy Boat (CURB/Agajanian/Boat Indy Racing)
- Time: 22.9666

Fastest lap
- Driver: (South Africa) Tomas Scheckter (Cheever Racing)
- Time: 23.1495 (on lap 166 of 200)

Podium
- First: (United States) Alex Barron (Blair Racing)
- Second: (Brazil) Gil de Ferran (Team Penske)
- Third: (United States) Sam Hornish Jr. (Panther Racing)

The 2002 Firestone Indy 200 was an Indy Racing League (IRL) motor race that was held at Nashville Superspeedway in Lebanon, Tennessee on July 20, 2002. It was the tenth round of the 2002 Indy Racing League and the second running of the event. Blair Racing driver Alex Barron won the 200-lap race from the fifth starting position, the first of his two IRL victories. Gil de Ferran of Team Penske finished second, and Sam Hornish Jr. was third for Panther Racing.

Billy Boat earned the pole position, his first since 1999, by lapping the fastest time of qualifying and setting a new track record in the process. Hornish passed him on lap 13 and soon became a clear factor to win the race, leading 95 laps. However, he was hit from behind by George Mack while slowing for a caution flag on lap 171, which putting him out of winning contention for the rest of the race. Scott Sharp resultantly assumed the lead until Barron overtook him on the 190th lap and led the remaining 11 laps. Sharp originally came in third, but was given a one-lap penalty by IRL officials for blocking on the final restart and dropped to eighth place.

The finishing order gave de Ferran the lead in the Drivers' Championship with a ten-point advantage over teammate Hélio Castroneves. Barron also improved three positions to claim fifth place in the standings with five races left in the season.

== Background ==
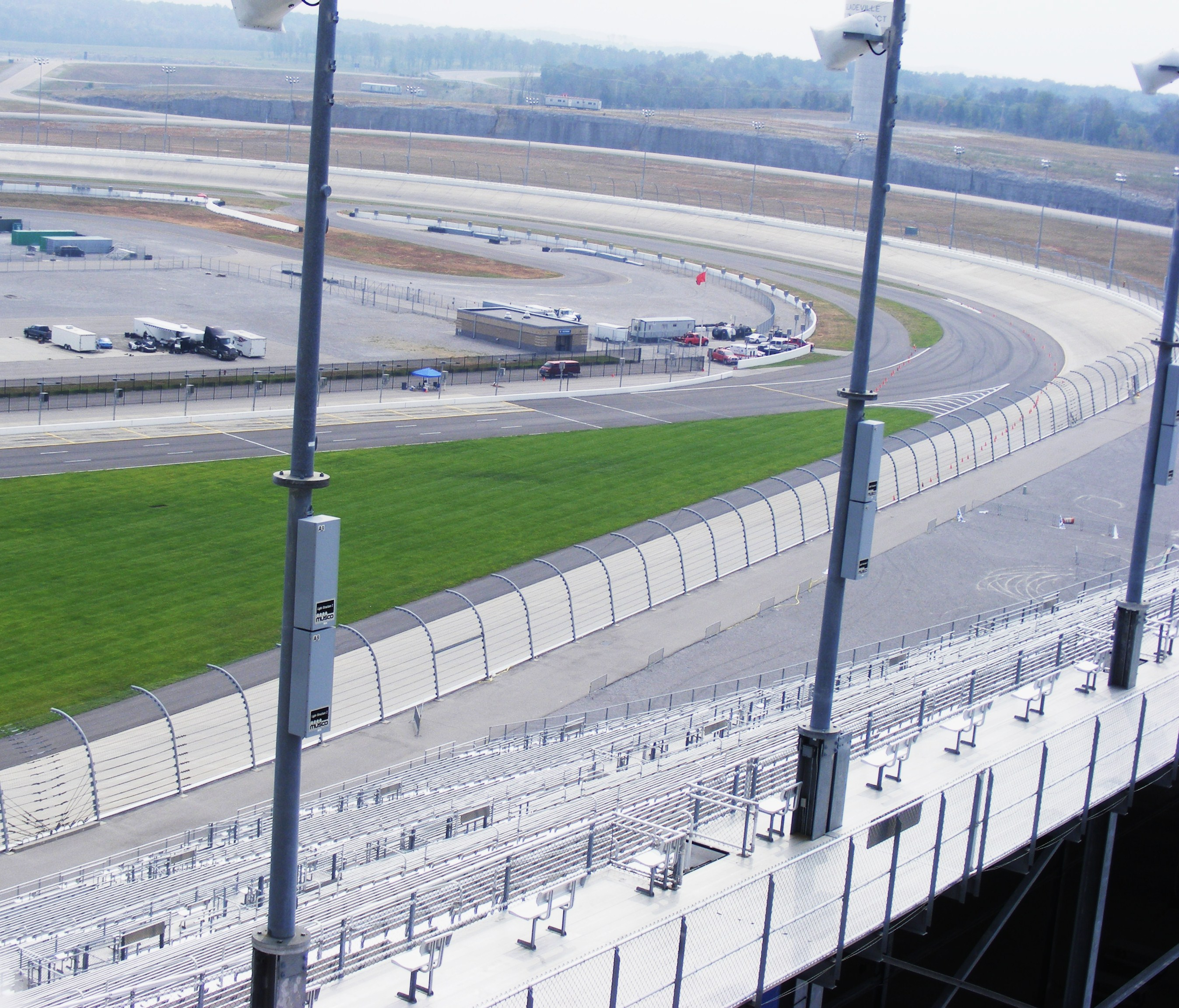
Nashville Superspeedway (pictured in 2007), where the race was held.

The second running of the Firestone Indy 200 was held on Saturday, July 20, 2002, as the tenth of 15 open-wheel races scheduled by the Indy Racing League (IRL) for their 2002 season and the third and final race to start at nighttime. Tire supplier Firestone was announced as the race's title sponsor in January 2002, replacing gaming corporation Harrah's Entertainment. As in the previous year, it was held at Nashville Superspeedway, a concrete-surfaced, 1.33 mi (2.14 km) oval track with banking as high as 14 degrees in its four turns. Entering the event, Hélio Castroneves led the Drivers' Championship with 315 points, eight more than countryman and Team Penske teammate Gil de Ferran. Sam Hornish Jr. stood third with 296 points, followed by Felipe Giaffone and Airton Daré with 269 and 226 points, respectively.

There were 16 teams that entered 22 cars for the race, the smallest entry list of the season. All cars used chassis built by either Dallara or G-Force, engines built by Chevrolet or Infiniti, and Firestone-produced tires. Two days before the race, Al Unser Jr. announced at a press conference in Indianapolis, Indiana that he would be seeking treatment for his alcohol addiction in an undisclosed rehabilitation center after getting arrested on July 9 on charges of alleged domestic violence, which were later dropped. In the meantime, Kelley Racing test driver Tony Renna took Unser's seat for the next two races. Three months after a crash in Indianapolis 500 testing left Eliseo Salazar with a broken vertebral artery, he completed his recovery process and returned at Nashville, forcing A. J. Foyt Racing to field a third entry for Salazar's temporary replacement, Greg Ray. Robby McGehee withdrew from the race after Beck Motorsports owner Ray Parsons was hospitalized for unexpected stomach surgery, though he was expected to return for the succeeding Michigan Indy 400.

Firestone Racing executive director Al Speyer predicted that speeds would exceed 200 mph (320 km/h) during the race weekend after Ray nearly eclipsed the mark to win the pole position the year prior. His sentiment was vindicated when Tomas Scheckter completed 125 laps in a testing session at Nashville Superspeedway on July 10, recording a top speed of 201.6 mph (324.4 km/h). Scheckter took a liking to testing at the track because "the concrete surface is different. It has less grip and a few bumps." De Ferran, who also tested at the circuit on the week of the race, admitted that he struggled with adjusting his vision for nighttime races: "While the track is illuminated, the look of the circuit is very different from that of a day race. There is nothing that can be done about it, you just have to get used to it and adjust visually to the nighttime conditions." Castroneves held a similar opinion, though he also felt positively about nighttime races because of the lack of humidity.

== Practice and qualifying ==
Three practice sessions were conducted prior to the race on Saturday night, two 90-minute sessions on Friday and one 30-minute session on Saturday afternoon. In the first two sessions, the drivers were also split into two groups, each receiving equal track time. Billy Boat was fastest in the first practice session with a lap time of 22.9531 seconds, followed by Scheckter, Buddy Lazier, Eddie Cheever, and Hornish. Boat then recorded the quickest time of the second practice session at 22.9425 seconds, with Lazier in second, Giaffone in third, Richie Hearn in fourth, and Scheckter in fifth.

On Friday afternoon, 90 minutes after the second practice session ended, the qualifying session was held to determine the starting grid. Each driver was to individually complete two timed laps, the fastest of which would determine their starting position. With a time of 22.9666 seconds, Boat earned his ninth career pole position and his first since the 1999 Kobalt Mechanics Tools 500. His speed of 203.774 mph (327.942 km/h) was a new track record, approximately 4 mph (6.4 km/h) faster than Ray's track record set the previous year. Castroneves was 0.0464 seconds slower than Boat and started alongside him on the grid's front row. Hornish, Scheckter, and Alex Barron rounded out the top-five, and the remaining top-ten positions were taken by Hearn, Sarah Fisher, Giaffone, Cheever, and Robbie Buhl. Scott Sharp, Lazier, de Ferran, Renna, Raul Boesel, Mark Dismore, Salazar, Jeff Ward, Daré, Ray, and George Mack filled the next 11 spots on the grid. Laurent Redon, 22nd, did not make a qualifying attempt because of an issue with his fuel pump.

The next day, Hornish lapped the quickest time of the third practice session at 23.2319 seconds, outpacing Sharp, Lazier, Hearn, and Castroneves. Ward prompted the only stoppage of the session when he contacted the front stretch wall with the right side of his car, which forced him to resort to a backup car. As a result, he was initially required to start 22nd as per IRL rules, but was later moved up to 21st because he had recorded a lap time in qualifying, whereas Redon did not.

=== Qualifying classification ===
Final qualifying results
Pos	No.	Driver	Team	Time	Speed	Grid
1	98	(United States) Billy Boat	CURB/Agajanian/Boat Indy Racing	22.9666	203.774	1
2	3	(Brazil) Hélio Castroneves	Team Penske	23.0130	203.363	2
3	4	(United States) Sam Hornish Jr.	Panther Racing	23.0446	203.084	3
4	52	(South Africa) Tomas Scheckter	Cheever Racing	23.0560	202.984	4
5	44	(United States) Alex Barron	Blair Racing	23.0599	202.950	5
6	20	(United States) Richie Hearn	Sam Schmidt Motorsports	23.0639	202.915	6
7	23	(United States) Sarah Fisher	Dreyer & Reinbold Racing	23.0941	202.649	7
8	21	(Brazil) Felipe Giaffone	Mo Nunn Racing	23.0946	202.645	8
9	51	(United States) Eddie Cheever	Cheever Racing	23.1121	202.491	9
10	24	(United States) Robbie Buhl	Dreyer & Reinbold Racing	23.1233	202.393	10
11	8	(United States) Scott Sharp	Kelley Racing	23.1265	202.365	11
12	91	(United States) Buddy Lazier	Hemelgarn Racing	23.1315	202.322	12
13	6	(Brazil) Gil de Ferran	Team Penske	23.1555	202.112	13
14	7	(United States) Tony Renna	Kelley Racing	23.1797	201.901	14
15	12	(Brazil) Raul Boesel	Bradley Motorsports	23.2625	201.182	15
16	2	(United States) Mark Dismore	Team Menard	23.2963	200.890	16
17	11	(Chile) Eliseo Salazar	A. J. Foyt Enterprises	23.3061	200.806	17
18	9	(United States) Jeff Ward	Chip Ganassi Racing	23.3616	200.329	21^{1}
19	14	(Brazil) Airton Daré	A. J. Foyt Enterprises	23.3640	200.308	18
20	41	(United States) Greg Ray	A. J. Foyt Enterprises	23.3774	200.193	19
21	31	(United States) George Mack	310 Racing	23.8742	196.028	20
22	34	(France) Laurent Redon	Conquest Racing	No time	No speed^{2}	22

Notes

- ^1 – Jeff Ward was forced to start in 21st place for switching to a backup car after a crash in the final practice session.
- ^2 – Laurent Redon failed to set a lap time because of a mechanical issue.

== Race ==
The race was contested over a distance of 200 laps and 266 miles (428 km). Ahead of the race, weather conditions were partly cloudy and humid, with air temperatures at 85 °F (29 °C) and track temperatures at 100 °F (38 °C). Firestone president and chief executive officer John Lampe commanded the drivers to start their engines, and three-time Indianapolis 500 winner Johnny Rutherford led the field with the pace car during the three warm-up laps. The race began at 7:35 p.m. Central Daylight Time (UTC−05:00); Boat used his pole position to his advantage and pulled clear of Castroneves to lead the first lap by 0.2724 seconds. By the end of the lap, Lazier had already improved from twelfth to fifth place. Six laps later, Hornish overtook Castroneves for second place entering turn three. He then reeled in Boat and attempted to pass him on the outside line in turn one, but Boat briefly managed to hold him off. On lap 13, Hornish dove to the inside line, nearly colliding with Boat in the process, and got by him to claim the lead. Fisher drove to pit road on the 18th lap after an issue with her car's battery caused her pace to slow.

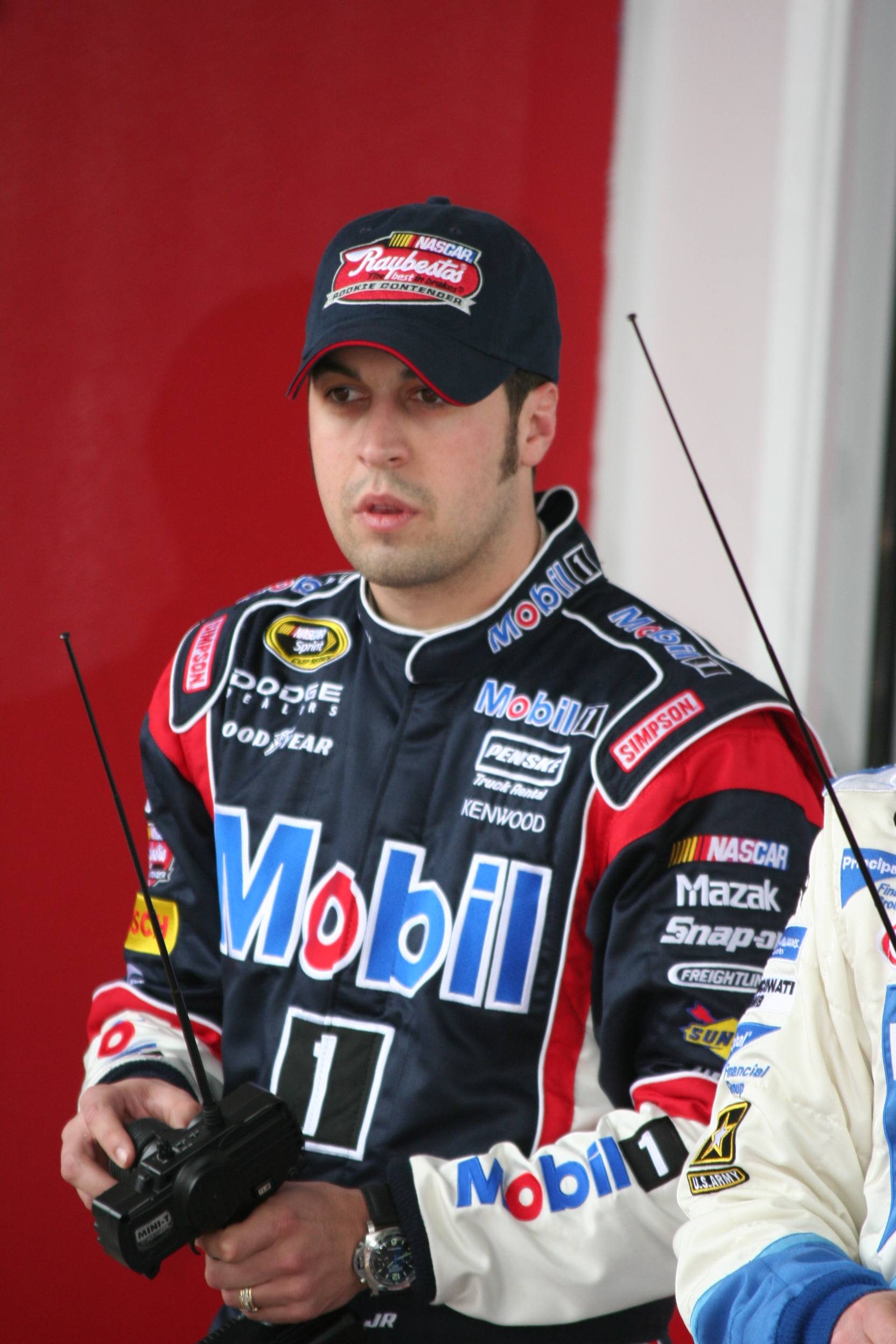
Sam Hornish Jr. (pictured in 2008) finished third after leading a race-high 95 laps.

Hornish held a 2.8945-second lead over Boat until the first caution flag was thrown on lap 24 when smoke billowed from the rear of Buhl's car, which meant that both Dreyer & Reinbold Racing drivers were out of the race. Most of the leaders opted to make pit stops during the caution period, while Renna and Salazar assumed the top-two positions for the lap-33 restart, ahead of Hornish, Castroneves, and Scheckter. Hornish struggled to get by the slower Salazar, allowing Castroneves to overtake him on the back stretch for third place on lap 42. Five laps later, Hornish finally maneuvered around Salazar and Castroneves to reclaim second place, though he remained over eight seconds behind Renna. Castroneves passed Salazar to move into third place on the 49th lap, and after de Ferran overtook Boat the following lap, he also passed Salazar on lap 53, dropping him to the fifth position. Salazar finally made a pit stop two laps later, although an issue replacing his right-rear tire prolonged the stop.

On the 59th lap, Boesel drifted into the right-side wall at the second turn, while Ray simultaneously made heavy contact with the wall on the front stretch, which brought about the race's second caution flag. Ray retired from the race, having sustained too much crash damage to continue. Renna led many of the leaders into pit road, but as he drove off, he spun and hit several cones. His car failed to restart, which resulted in him being pushed to his pit stall by track officials and losing three laps to the leaders. Cheever, who decided not to pit, led the field back up to speed during the restart on the 70th lap, followed by Barron in second, Castroneves in third, Hornish in fourth, and de Ferran in fifth. By the end of lap 75, Hornish had already improved to the second position, while Barron dropped to second and Castroneves fell to fifth. After maneuvering around the lapped Salazar, Hornish set his sights on Cheever, whom he quickly overtook for the lead in turn one on lap 78. Shortly thereafter, Cheever was also passed for the second position by de Ferran.

Debris was spotted on the front stretch, which prompted the third caution flag. Cheever and a few others who had not pitted previously took the opportunity to make their stops for fuel, fresh tires, and adjustments under the caution period. Hornish led at the lap-84 restart and gradually extended his lead over de Ferran to 3.0961 seconds during the next 23 laps, as Daré remained third, Castroneves fourth, and Scheckter fifth. On the 107th lap, however, de Ferran dove into pit road after suffering a puncture in his right-rear tire; he rejoined the race a lap behind the leaders. Three laps later, Salazar slid into the wall at the second corner, causing the caution to be thrown for the fourth time. He was taken out of his damaged car with assistance from IRL safety officials. Most of the leaders made pit stops under the caution period. During the pit sequence, Hornish lost two positions to Castroneves and Daré. Cheever assumed the lead for the second time as he intended to complete the race with only three pit stops. However, it only took Daré one lap after the restart on lap 117 to move from third to first place. Cheever subsequently lost the second position to Castroneves on the 119th lap and the third position to Hornish two laps later. On the 126th lap, Hornish turned to the left side of Castroneves and passed him to take second place in turn three. He then completed the same maneuver to claim the lead from Daré on lap 128. Daré quickly lost control of his car and slid into the outside wall in turn four with the right side, which prompted the fifth caution flag. Cheever and Barron were the only drivers to cede their positions and make a pit stop.

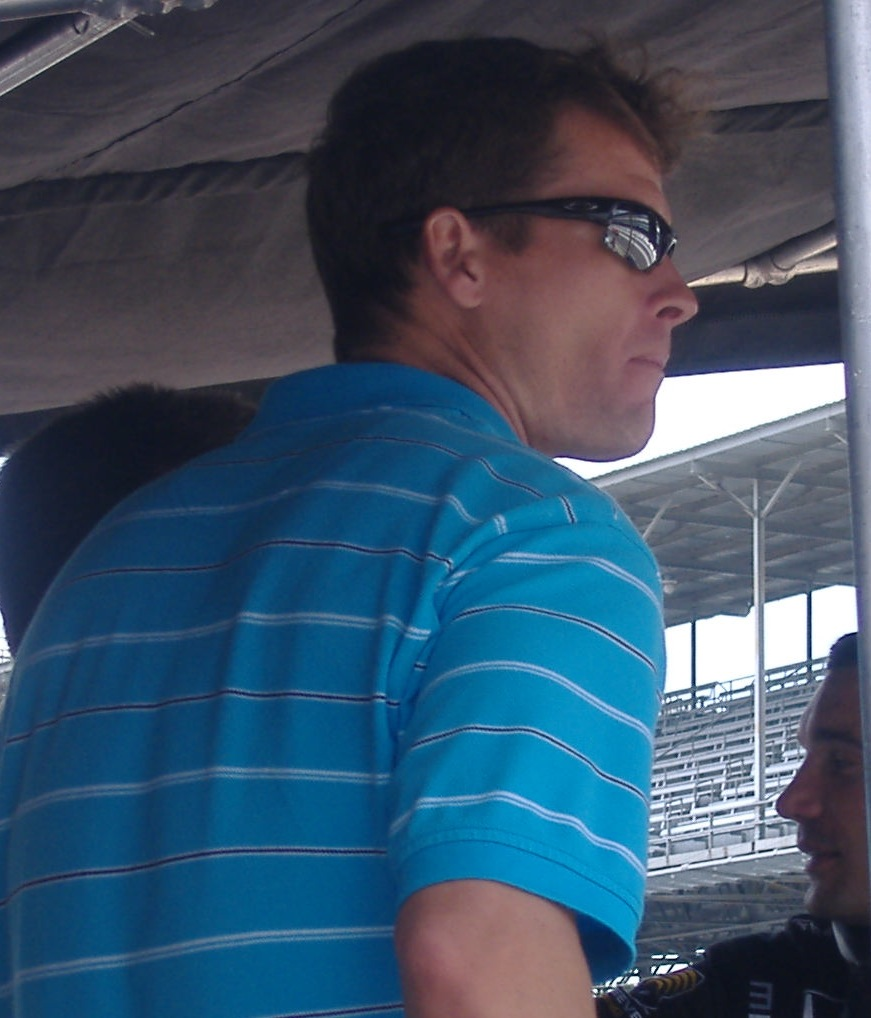
Alex Barron (pictured in 2006) earned his maiden IRL victory.

The top-five drivers at the lap-137 restart were Hornish, Castroneves, Scheckter, Boat, and Giaffone. The race quickly settled into a rhythm, as Hornish amassed a 7.5-second gap between himself and Castroneves. On the 161st lap, Castroneves was forced to cede his position due to a punctured right-rear tire, just as his teammate had earlier on. Ten laps later, Scheckter slammed the turn-two wall with the right-rear of his car while trying to pass his teammate Cheever and was then hit by Boat, causing the race's sixth caution flag. After the crash, Scheckter was heard over radio communications saying: "Why, Eddie (Cheever), why?" As Hornish slowed in accordance with the caution, his left-rear tire was hit by the right-front tire of Mack. The contact flattened Hornish's tire and damaged his left sidepod, forcing him to pit and give up the lead to Sharp. Behind Sharp, the remaining positions in the top-five were taken by Hearn, Barron, de Ferran, and Hornish as green-flag resumed on lap 179. The field bunched up, and Giaffone and Renna nearly slid into the wall in turn two; Lazier also slowed down to avoid colliding into Renna.

Three laps later, Lazier slammed the turn-two wall and came to a rest towards the third corner, bringing out the seventh caution flag. Giaffone, from eighth place, was the only driver to pit in order to change his left-rear tire. During the ensuing restart on lap 189, Barron pulled alongside Sharp on the inside line in the first turn and overtook him in turn three to lead the following lap. Hornish got by Hearn for the fourth position on lap 191. Four laps later, the race's eighth caution was thrown for Ward spinning at the exit of turn four. Ward did not expel any debris on the track, allowing the race to be resumed on the 198th lap. Approaching the start/finish line, de Ferran steered below the racing surface to get to Sharp's left side and took the second position from him in turn one. Barron, meanwhile, maintained the lead for the final three laps to take his first career IRL win in his 11th start, with a 0.4234-second margin of victory over de Ferran.

Sharp held off Hornish to finish third, but immediately after the race, he and Kelley Racing owner Tom Kelley were summoned to the IRL Administration trailer to be informed that they were docked one lap for blocking on the final restart, which dropped him to eighth place in the finishing order. This promoted Hornish to third, Hearn to fourth, Boesel to fifth, Cheever to sixth, and Giaffone to seventh. Castroneves and Renna rounded out the top-ten, and the final classified finishers were Ward, Mack, and Redon. During the course of the race, the lead was changed nine times between seven different drivers. Hornish led 95 laps, more than any other driver, while race winner Barron led 11 laps.

=== Post-race ===
During interviews after the race, a jubilant Barron praised his team, Blair Racing, for their efforts throughout the season, stating: "This has been a long time coming. We’ve had a good time all year. To do what we did just now it feels really, really good. It just shows what kind of team Rayovac Blair Racing has." He described the race weekend as "up-and-down" and said of the final restart, "The last restart, it’s kind of hard when you’re leading because they can gauge off of you. Scott (Sharp) and Gil (de Ferran) got a good run, but fortunately I had some good momentum going into (turn) 1. I knew that’s all it would take. I just ran strong until the end while they were battling." He earned $113,800 for his win. His team owner, Larry Blair, said that the win was "a moment I have actually dreamed about for about two years now. To actually have it come true is a pretty phenomenal experience and one that I will cherish forever. It is very special." Second-place de Ferran was pleased with his race and felt that he had timed the final restart perfectly, allowing him to get by Sharp. He lauded Barron for his speed: "I have to give it to Barron, he really stood on it on that last lap and gave me no chance." Hornish, who finished third, likened his collision with Mack to his accident with Cheever in the Boomtown 500 in June, but thanked his team for providing him with a car that was "two, three miles an hour faster than everybody else."

Sharp explained his driving on the final restart that led to his penalty: "I didn't know quite where Gil was. I knew he tried to move down, finally I saw that he was there. He had me so I decided to give him the room. I had to get to the bottom so my car wouldn't slide up, and from there I just tried to protect the bottom. Anytime I went high, the car seemed like it really got tight on me. We had a left-rear tire that we found was leaking huge air, so we got pretty lucky." A happy Renna discussed the emotions he felt leading several laps in his debut IRL race: "It is hard to describe my feelings when I was leading the race. I hope Al Jr. was watching and saw we took good care of his baby. I want to again express our support for Al Jr. and can hardly wait until he is back in the car." With the experience that he earned at Nashville, he expressed anticipation for the next round at Michigan International Speedway. Scheckter admitted that he was unsure of what caused his lap-171 crash, though Boat told him that "there might have been something on the track." The final race result meant that de Ferran took the Drivers' Championship lead with 347 points, dropping Castroneves (with 337 points) back one position. Hornish remained third on 333 points, as did fourth-place Giaffone on 295, while Barron was promoted from eighth to fifth on 243 points as five races remained in the season.

=== Race classification ===
Final race results
Pos	No.	Driver	Team	Laps	Time/Retired	Grid	Points
1	44	(United States) Alex Barron	Blair Racing	200	2:01:52.6791	5	50
2	6	(Brazil) Gil de Ferran	Team Penske	200	+0.4234	4	40
3	4	(United States) Sam Hornish Jr.	Panther Racing	200	+2.6576	3	37^{1}
4	20	(United States) Richie Hearn	Sam Schmidt Motorsports	200	+3.2507	6	32
5	12	(Brazil) Raul Boesel	Bradley Motorsports	200	+3.7859	15	30
6	51	(United States) Eddie Cheever	Cheever Racing	200	+5.1713	9	28
7	21	(Brazil) Felipe Giaffone	Mo Nunn Racing	200	+5.3596	8	26
8^{2}	8	(United States) Scott Sharp	Kelley Racing	199	+1 Lap	11	24
9	3	(Brazil) Hélio Castroneves	Team Penske	199	+1 Lap	2	22
10	7	(United States) Tony Renna	Kelley Racing	195	+5 Laps	14	20
11	9	(United States) Jeff Ward	Chip Ganassi Racing	193	+7 Laps	21	19
12	91	(United States) Buddy Lazier	Hemelgarn Racing	181	Accident	12	18
13	52	(South Africa) Tomas Scheckter	Cheever Racing	170	Accident	4	17
14	98	(United States) Billy Boat	CURB/Agajanian/Boat Indy Racing	170	Accident	1	16
15	31	(United States) George Mack	310 Racing	152	+48 Laps	20	15
16	34	(France) Laurent Redon	Conquest Racing	133	+67 Laps	22	14
17	14	(Brazil) Airton Daré	A. J. Foyt Enterprises	127	Accident	18	13
18	2	(United States) Mark Dismore	Team Menard	107	Engine	16	12
19	11	(Chile) Eliseo Salazar	A. J. Foyt Enterprises	106	Accident	17	11
20	41	(United States) Greg Ray	A. J. Foyt Enterprises	57	Accident	19	10
21	24	(United States) Robbie Buhl	Dreyer & Reinbold Racing	23	Engine	10	9
22	23	(United States) Sarah Fisher	Dreyer & Reinbold Racing	19	Engine	7	8

Notes

- ^1 – Includes two bonus points for leading the most laps.
- ^2 – Scott Sharp originally finished third, but was demoted to eighth place, a lap behind the leaders, for on-track blocking.

== Championship standings after the race ==
Drivers' Championship standings
+/-	Pos	Driver	Points
1	1	(Brazil) Gil de Ferran	347
1	2	(Brazil) Hélio Castroneves	337 (–10)
	3	(United States) Sam Hornish Jr.	333 (–14)
	4	(Brazil) Felipe Giaffone	295 (–52)
3	5	(United States) Alex Barron	243 (–104)

- Note: Only the top five positions are included.

Previous race: 2002 Ameristar Casino Indy 200	IndyCar Series; 2002 season	Next race: 2002 Michigan Indy 400
Previous race: 2001 Harrah's 200	Firestone Indy 200	Next race: 2003 Firestone Indy 200
