= 2002 Michigan Indy 400 =

Coordinates: 42°03′58.68″N 84°14′29.18″W

(United States) 2002 Michigan Indy 400
Race details
- Race 11 of 15 in the 2002 Indy Racing League season
- Date: July 28, 2002
- Official name: 2002 Michigan Indy 400
- Location: Michigan International Speedway, Brooklyn, Michigan, United States
- Course: Permanent racing facility 2.000 mi / 3.219 km
- Distance: 200 laps 400.000 mi / 643.800 km

Pole position
- Driver: (South Africa) Tomas Scheckter (Team Cheever)
- Time: 32.4518

Fastest lap
- Driver: (South Africa) Tomas Scheckter (Team Cheever)
- Time: 32.5672 (on lap unknown of 200)

Podium
- First: (South Africa) Tomas Scheckter (Team Cheever)
- Second: (United States) Buddy Rice (Team Cheever)
- Third: (Brazil) Felipe Giaffone (Mo Nunn Racing)

The 2002 Michigan Indy 400 was the eleventh round of the 2002 Indy Racing League season. The race was held on July 28, 2002, at the 2.00 mi Michigan International Speedway in Brooklyn, Michigan. In what many consider to be one of the greatest finishes in IndyCar history, rookie Tomas Scheckter scored his first win in open-wheel competition after charging to the front in a race that saw an astonishing number of passes and lead changes in the closing laps of the race, including the first time a woman has ever led an IndyCar race on merit (Sarah Fisher). Team Cheever teammate Buddy Rice finished in second place in his IndyCar debut while team owner/driver Eddie Cheever crashed during the race. It would be the team's only win of the season and their last in open-wheel racing.

The circumstances surrounding the first-ever IRL-sanctioned race at Michigan made for a dramatic and electric atmosphere: Scheckter, despite his quickness during the season, was more known for his recklessness, frequently crashed and cost Team Cheever several potential wins. Eddie Cheever was grooming Buddy Rice to take over Scheckter's seat in the #52, but due to contractual obligations he could not release Scheckter until the next race at Kentucky Speedway. Nevertheless, Cheever gave Rice the preferred equipment, spare parts, and pit crew for the race. Scheckter, now on a personal vendetta, dominated the race from pole position, led the most laps, but almost gave up the win after a poor late-race pit stop, falling back to 12th place, the last car on the lead lap. From there, he ferociously battled his way back to the front in an amazing display of raw speed and talent. Despite the win, Scheckter was still let go from Team Cheever after Kentucky.

The prevalence of drafting allowed for the field to race in tight side-by-side packs, not unusual for NASCAR events but very unusual for open-wheel races. Drivers would often swap positions each lap in order to take advantage of the draft and gain ground on the next competitor. This became especially important during the last twenty-five lap sprint to the finish when multiple drivers jockeyed for position.

== Qualifying ==
July 27, 2002 - Qualifying Speeds
Rank	Driver	Time	Leader	Speed (mph)	Team
1	(South Africa) Tomas Scheckter (R)	32.4518	—	221.868	Team Cheever
2	(United States) Buddy Rice (R)	32.4571	+0.005	221.831	Team Cheever
3	(United States) Eddie Cheever	32.6785	+0.227	220.328	Team Cheever
4	(United States) Sam Hornish Jr.	32.7898	+0.338	219.580	Panther Racing
5	(United States) Mark Dismore	32.8325	+0.381	219.295	Team Menard
6	(Brazil) Helio Castroneves	32.8631	+0.411	219.091	Team Penske
7	(United States) Alex Barron	32.9317	+0.480	218.634	Blair Racing
8	(United States) Sarah Fisher	32.9341	+0.482	218.618	Dreyer & Reinbold Racing
9	(Chile) Eliseo Salazar	32.9366	+0.485	218.602	A. J. Foyt Enterprises
10	(United States) Tony Renna (R)	32.9428	+0.491	218.561	Kelley Racing
11	(United States) Robbie Buhl	32.9849	+0.533	218.282	Dreyer & Reinbold Racing
12	(Brazil) Felipe Giaffone	32.9891	+0.537	218.254	Mo Nunn Racing
13	(Brazil) Airton Daré	33.0377	+0.586	217.933	A. J. Foyt Enterprises
14	(France) Laurent Redon (R)	33.0435	+0.592	217.895	Conquest Racing
15	(United States) Buddy Lazier	33.0929	+0.641	217.569	Hemelgarn Racing
16	(United States) Scott Sharp	33.0942	+0.642	217.561	Kelley Racing
17	(Brazil) Gil de Ferran	33.1146	+0.663	217.427	Team Penske
18	(Brazil) Raul Boesel	33.1181	+0.666	217.404	Bradley Motorsports
19	(United States) Billy Boat	33.1408	+0.689	217.255	Curb/Agajanian/Beck Motorsports
20	(Netherlands) Arie Luyendyk	33.1763	+0.724	217.022	Treadway Racing
21	(United States) Richie Hearn	33.1785	+0.727	217.008	Sam Schmidt Motorsports
22	(United States) Jeff Ward	33.3209	+0.869	216.081	Chip Ganassi Racing
23	(United States) Greg Ray	33.5079	+1.056	214.875	A. J. Foyt Enterprises
24	(United States) George Mack (R)	33.5806	+1.129	214.410	310 Racing
25	(United States) Scott Harrington	33.8255	+1.374	212.857	Brayton Racing

== Race ==
Pos	No	Driver	Team	Laps	Time/retired	Grid	Points
1	52	(South Africa) Tomas Scheckter (R)	Team Cheever	200	2:14:03	1	52^{1}
2	53	(United States) Buddy Rice (R)	Team Cheever	200	+1.704 secs	2	40
3	21	(Brazil) Felipe Giaffone	Mo Nunn Racing	200	Running	12	35
4	7	(United States) Tony Renna (R)	Kelley Racing	200	Running	10	32
5	6	(Brazil) Gil de Ferran	Team Penske	200	Running	17	30
6	3	(Brazil) Helio Castroneves	Team Penske	200	Running	6	28
7	4	(United States) Sam Hornish Jr.	Panther Racing	200	Running	4	26
8	23	(United States) Sarah Fisher	Dreyer & Reinbold Racing	200	Running	8	24
9	8	(United States) Scott Sharp	Kelley Racing	200	Running	16	22
10	20	(United States) Richie Hearn	Sam Schmidt Motorsports	200	Running	21	20
11	34	(France) Laurent Redon (R)	Conquest Racing	200	Running	14	19
12	44	(United States) Alex Barron	Blair Racing	198	+2 Laps	7	18
13	91	(United States) Buddy Lazier	Hemelgarn Racing	198	+2 Laps	15	17
14	98	(United States) Billy Boat	Curb/Agajanian/Beck Motorsports	198	+2 Laps	19	16
15	12	(Brazil) Raul Boesel	Bradley Motorsports	197	+3 Laps	18	15
16	55	(Netherlands) Arie Luyendyk	Treadway Racing	197	+3 Laps	20	14
17	41	(United States) Greg Ray	A. J. Foyt Enterprises	196	+4 Laps	23	13
18	2	(United States) Mark Dismore	Team Menard	194	+6 Laps	5	12
19	11	(Chile) Eliseo Salazar	A. J. Foyt Enterprises	192	+8 Laps	9	11
20	31	(United States) George Mack (R)	310 Racing	183	+17 Laps	24	10
21	37	(United States) Scott Harrington	Brayton Racing	171	+29 Laps	25	9
22	51	(United States) Eddie Cheever	Team Cheever	165	Contact	3	8
23	14	(Brazil) Airton Daré	A. J. Foyt Enterprises	127	Mechanical	13	7
24	24	(United States) Robbie Buhl	Dreyer & Reinbold Racing	95	Engine	11	6
25	9	(United States) Jeff Ward	Chip Ganassi Racing	91	Contact	22	5

1. Includes two bonus points for pole position and leading the most laps.

== Race Statistics ==
- Lead changes: 25 among 9 drivers

Lap Leaders
Laps	Leader
1-36	Tomas Scheckter
37-38	Buddy Rice
39-41	Helio Castroneves
42-44	Tony Renna
45-69	Tomas Scheckter
70	Felipe Giaffone
71-80	Tomas Scheckter
81-87	Felipe Giaffone
88-92	Scott Sharp
93-97	Gil de Ferran
98-122	Tomas Scheckter
123-129	Buddy Rice
130-134	Felipe Giaffone
135-139	Sam Hornish Jr.
140-141	Gil de Ferran
142-143	Helio Castroneves
144-162	Tomas Scheckter
163-168	Buddy Rice
169-173	Sam Hornish Jr.
174-178	Gil de Ferran
179-184	Felipe Giafffone
185	Sarah Fisher
186	Felipe Giaffone
187-189	Sarah Fisher
190-193	Felipe Giaffone
194-200	Tomas Scheckter

Leader	Laps
Tomas Scheckter	122
Felipe Giaffone	24
Buddy Rice	15
Gil de Ferran	12
Sam Hornish Jr.	10
Helio Castroneves	5
Scott Sharp	5
Sarah Fisher	4
Tony Renna	3

Cautions: 5 for 25 laps
Laps	Reason
46-50	Debris
57-58	Debris
95-101	Ward crash
147-149	Debris
166-173	Cheever crash

== Standings after the race ==
Drivers' Championship standings

Rank	+/–	Driver	Points
1		(Brazil) Gil de Ferran	377
2		(Brazil) Helio Castroneves	365
3		(United States) Sam Hornish Jr.	359
4		(Brazil) Felipe Giaffone	330
5		(United States) Alex Barron	261

- Note: Only the top five positions are included for the standings.

Previous race: 2002 Firestone Indy 200	IndyCar Series; 2002 season	Next race: 2002 Belterra Casino Indy 300
Previous race: 2001 Harrah's 500	Michigan Indy 400	Next race: 2003 Firestone Indy 400
