= 2002 Delphi Indy 300 =

(United States) 2002 Delphi Indy 300
Race details
- Race 14 of 15 in the 2002 Indy Racing League season
- Date: September 8, 2002
- Location: Chicagoland Speedway, Joliet, Illinois
- Course: Permanent racing facility 1.5 mi / 2.4 km
- Distance: 200 laps 300 mi / 482.803 km
- Weather: Dry and sunny

Pole position
- Driver: (United States) Sam Hornish Jr. (Panther Racing)
- Time: 24.5528

Fastest lap
- Driver: (United States) Buddy Rice (Cheever Racing)
- Time: 24.4216 (on lap 146 of 200)

Podium
- First: (United States) Sam Hornish Jr. (Panther Racing)
- Second: (United States) Al Unser Jr. (Kelley Racing)
- Third: (United States) Buddy Lazier (Hemelgarn Racing)

The 2002 Delphi Indy 300 was an Indy Racing League (IRL) open-wheel race that took place on September 8, 2002, at Chicagoland Speedway in Joliet, Illinois, in front of approximately 50,000 spectators. It was the 14th of 15 scheduled rounds of the 2002 Indy Racing League and the second annual running of the event. Panther Racing driver Sam Hornish Jr. won the 200-lap race from pole position with the closest margin of victory in the IRL of 0.0024 seconds over Al Unser Jr. of Kelley Racing. Third place was Hemelgarn Racing's Buddy Lazier.

Hornish earned his second IRL pole position by posting the fastest qualifying lap. Hornish led the race until he was passed by Buddy Rice after the first restart, which was prompted by a caution on the 25th lap to tend to Laurent Redon's car. Hornish retook the lead after passing Unser on lap 75, but he was overtaken by Scott Sharp 42 laps later. On lap 151, Sharp was passed by Hornish for first place. On the 167th lap, Unser passed Hélio Castroneves and reclaimed the lead. For the rest of the race, Unser and Hornish traded the lead, and it was Hornish who won, his fourth of the season and seventh overall.

During the race, there were five cautions and eighteen lead changes between four drivers. Hornish now led the points standings with 481 championship points. Castroneves, who led the championship before the race, fell to second, while Team Penske teammate Gil de Ferran fell to third after a heavy crash on the 52nd lap. Felipe Giaffone and Alex Barron remained fourth and fifth with one race remaining in the season.

== Background ==
The 2002 Delphi Indy 300 was confirmed as a part of the 2002 Indy Racing League (IRL) schedule for their racing series in June 2001. It was the event's second consecutive running; it was the 14th race scheduled for 2002 by the IRL, out of 15, and it took place at the 1.5 mi (2.4 km) Chicagoland Speedway D-shaped asphalt tri-oval race circuit, in Joliet, Illinois, on September 8, 2002, with a scheduled race distance of 200 laps (300 mi (480 km). Hélio Castroneves led the points standings with 437 points at this late stage of the season. He was one point ahead of teammate Gil de Ferran, who was seven points ahead of Sam Hornish Jr. in third. Felipe Giaffone was fourth with 391 points, 73 more than Alex Barron in fifth. Jaques Lazier was the event's reigning winner from the 2001 edition.

The event featured 26 participants from 19 different teams, with two driver changes. Every competitor drove a Dallara IR-02 or G-Force GF05 car powered by a Chevrolet or Infiniti engine. 1999 U.S. F2000 National Champion and two-time Indy Lights series winner Dan Wheldon joined Panther Racing to partner Hornish for the final two races of the season. In June, he visited Chicagoland Speedway to learn more about the IRL. Wheldon expressed his excitement to be associated with and work with Panther Racing, and expressed his belief that it would be a good opportunity to learn from the team's personnel. 1999 Indy Racing League champion Greg Ray was hired to drive the No. 20 Sam Schmidt Motorsports car for the rest of the season after requesting a release from his former manager A. J. Foyt. Ray replaced regular driver Richie Hearn, who broke his foot at the Belterra Casino Indy 300 in August 2002.

== Practice and qualifying ==
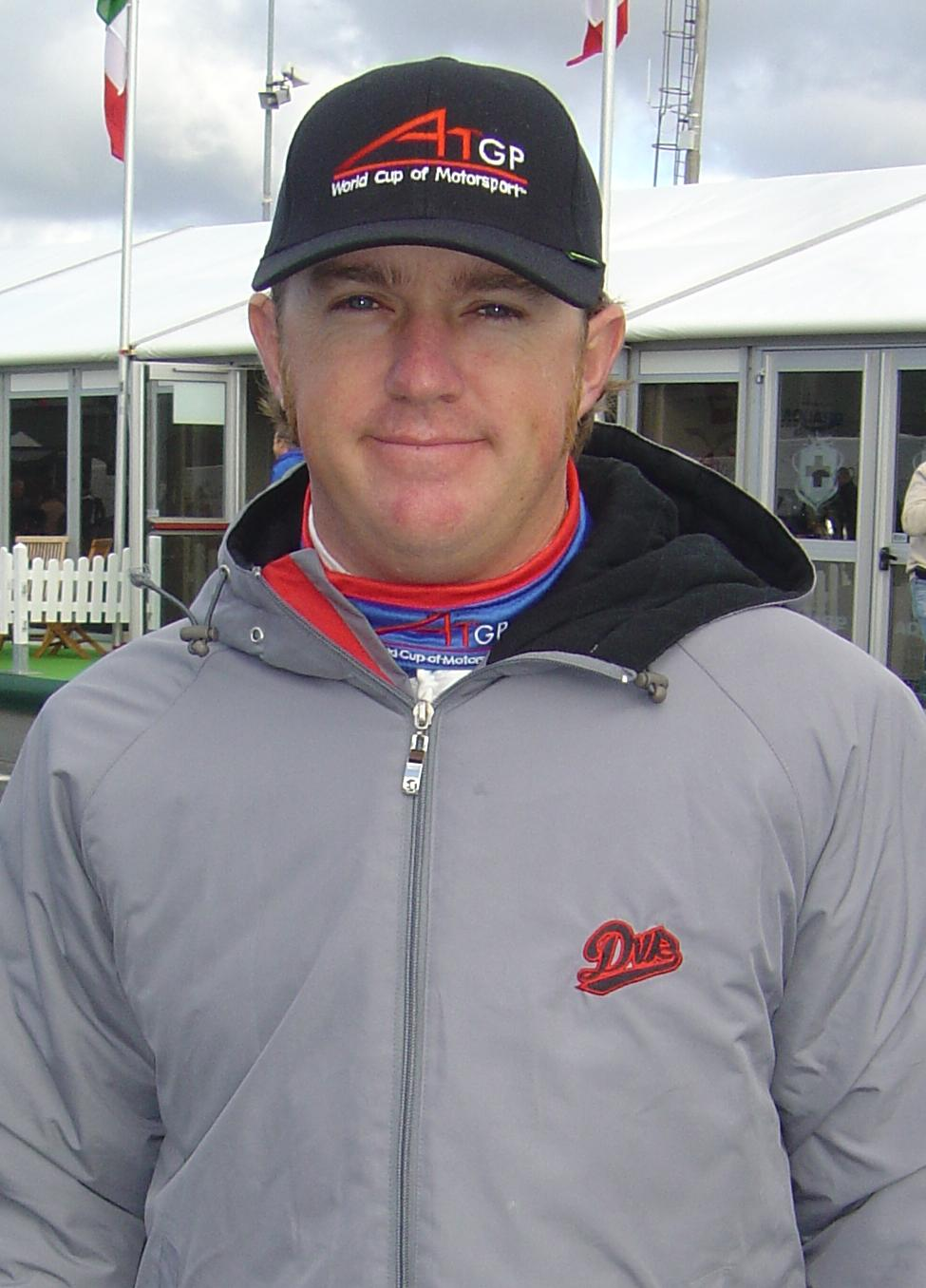
Buddy Rice (pictured in 2007) qualified on the front row of the grid in second place.

There were four practice sessions preceding Sunday's race; two on Friday and Saturday. The first and second sessions lasted 90 minutes, the third 60 minutes and the fourth 30 minutes. The racers were split into two groups, which were each allowed to run laps for half a session. The Friday practice sessions were held in warm, sunny weather. The first yellow caution flag flew when Hideki Noda's engine failed leaving the fourth turn and stopped on the backstretch; he did not participate in the second session because his team was changing his engine. The second occurred when Giaffone collided with the outside retaining barrier between turns three and four, and Hornish was involved, bending his left-front suspension, front wing, and puncturing his chassis tub. Both drivers were uninjured. Buddy Rice led the session with a time of 24.4578 seconds, followed by Eddie Cheever Jr. and Billy Boat. The top five were completed by Vítor Meira and Sarah Fisher.

Hornish's car's left-front section was repaired in time for the second session, where he set the fastest lap of 24.4910 seconds; Cheever was second and Rice third. Al Unser Jr. and Giaffone were fourth and fifth. Two caution flags came out for track inspections. The third practice session was held in sunny and warm weather, with Unser setting the fastest lap time of 24.5953 seconds. Rice was second, with Meira third. Boat was fourth, with Robbie Buhl fifth.

The starting grid was determined by qualifying an hour after the third practice session ended. Each driver completed two laps, and the competitor with the slowest time did not qualify. The weather was pleasant and sunny. Hornish set a new track record at Chicagoland Speedway, his second of the season and his career, with a time of 24.5528 seconds at a speed of 222.867 mph (358.670 km/h) after winning the season-opening Grand Prix of Miami at Homestead–Miami Speedway. Rice, who was 0.0570 seconds slower than Hornish, joined him on the front row of the grid. Unser qualified third, with Boat fourth. Completing the top ten were Cheever, Wheldon, Laurent Redon, Buhl, and Giaffone. The rest of the field lined up as De Ferran, Fisher, Jeff Ward, Eliseo Salazar, Airton Daré, Scott Sharp, Tony Renna, Alex Barron, Raul Boesel, Ray, Castroneves, Buddy Lazier, Will Langhorne, George Mack, and Noda. Scott Mayer did not qualify due to fluctuating oil pressure; the IRL barred him from competing due to inexperience. After qualifying, Hornish said he would put forward his strong form into the race, "When we start on the pole and the people were are running with for the championship are 11th and 20th or whatever, it helps out quite a bit."

The final practice session was held on Saturday afternoon in hot weather. The first caution came after 18 minutes when race officials discovered debris in turn two. Wheldon slowed in the fourth turn with his engine failing and engaged neutral gear before stopping nine minutes later. Hornish led with a lap of 24.3401 seconds with Unser Jr. second-quickest. Rice was third, with Wheldon fourth, and Cheever fifth.

=== Qualifying classification ===
Final qualifying classification
Pos	No.	Driver	Team	Time	Speed	Gap
1	4	Sam Hornish Jr. (USA)	Panther Racing	24.5528	222.867	—
2	53	Buddy Rice (USA)	Cheever Racing	24.6100	222.349	+0.0572
3	7	Al Unser Jr. (USA)	Kelley Racing	24.6363	222.111	+0.0835
4	98	Billy Boat (USA)	CURB Motorsports	24.6811	221.708	+0.1283
5	2	Vítor Meira (BRA)	Team Menard	24.7269	221.297	+0.1741
6	51	Eddie Cheever Jr. (USA)	Cheever Racing	24.7287	221.281	+0.1759
7	15	Dan Wheldon (GBR)	Panther Racing	24.7658	220.950	+0.2130
8	34	Laurent Redon (FRA)	Conquest Racing	24.7660	220.948	+0.2132
9	24	Robbie Buhl (USA)	Dreyer & Reinbold Racing	24.7663	220.945	+0.2135
10	21	Felipe Giaffone (BRA)	Mo Nunn Racing	24.8056	220.595	+0.2528
11	6	Gil de Ferran (BRA)	Team Penske	24.8105	222.552	+0.2577
12	23	Sarah Fisher (USA)	Dreyer & Reinbold Racing	24.8393	220.296	+0.2865
13	9	Jeff Ward (USA)	Chip Ganassi Racing	24.8686	220.037	+0.3158
14	11	Eliseo Salazar (CHL)	A. J. Foyt Enterprises	24.8743	219.986	+0.3215
15	14	Airton Daré (BRA)	A. J. Foyt Enterprises	24.8848	219.893	+0.3320
16	8	Scott Sharp (USA)	Kelley Racing	24.8858	219.884	+0.3330
17	78	Tony Renna (USA)	Kelley Racing	24.8899	219.848	+0.3371
18	44	Alex Barron (USA)	Blair Racing	24.9494	219.324	+0.3966
19	12	Raul Boesel (BRA)	Bradley Motorsports	24.9560	219.266	+0.4032
20	20	Greg Ray (USA)	Sam Schmidt Motorsports	24.9829	219.030	+0.4301
21	3	Hélio Castroneves (BRA)	Team Penske	25.0026	218.857	+0.4498
22	91	Buddy Lazier (USA)	Hemelgarn Racing	25.0097	218.795	+0.4569
23	55	Will Langhorne (USA)	Treadway Racing	25.0314	218.605	+0.4786
24	31	George Mack (USA)	310 Racing	25.1640	217.454	+0.6112
25	28	Hideki Noda (JPN)	Indy Regency Racing	25.9775	210.644	+1.4247
DNQ	18	Scott Mayer (USA)	PDM Racing	—	—	—

== Race ==
The conditions on the grid were dry and sunny. The air temperature was at 86 °F (30 °C) with the track temperature at 113 °F (45 °C) and calm winds. Approximately 50,000 spectators attended the event. USAC Chaplin Dave Cochran began pre-race ceremonies with an invocation. Singer Elle Gerdes performed the national anthem, and J.T. Battenberg III, chairman, president, and CEO of the Delphi Corporation commanded the drivers to start their engines. The race commenced at 12:10 p.m. Central Daylight Time (UTC−05:00). and was broadcast live on television on ABC and by IMS Radio Network on radio via local Chicago affiliates WJOL and WAIT. Bob Jenkins hosted ABC's broadcast, with commentary provided by Scott Goodyear, and Paul Page. Jack Arute and Gary Gerould served as pit lane reporters. The IMS Radio broadcast team consisted of host Mike King, analyst Johnny Parsons Jr., turn commentator Mark Jaynes and pit lane reporters Kim Morris and John Murphy.

Hornish maintained his pole position advantage to lead the field into the first corner. After starting 11th, De Ferran was seventh by the start of lap four. Nine laps later, De Ferran overtook Meira in turn two for sixth. The first caution flag was waved on the next lap when Rédon's engine failed in turn two, and he returned to pit road to retire. Several drivers chose to stop for fuel and tyres during the caution. Ward and Noda stopped for new front wings to be installed on their cars for aerodynamic reasons. The green flag was shown on lap 25 to resume racing. Hornish maintained his lead into turn one, but he was passed on the left two corners later by Rice. By lap 28, De Ferran had moved to fifth place. Three laps later, Unser was passed by Boat in turn one. Unser passed De Ferran on the outside of turn three on the 43rd lap for fourth. Unser used Noda's slower car to pass Hornish for second at turn one on lap 46. Unser led the field by 0.0375 seconds on lap 48 after drawing alongside Rice for one lap. Hornish quickly passed Rice. The second caution flag was displayed on lap 52.

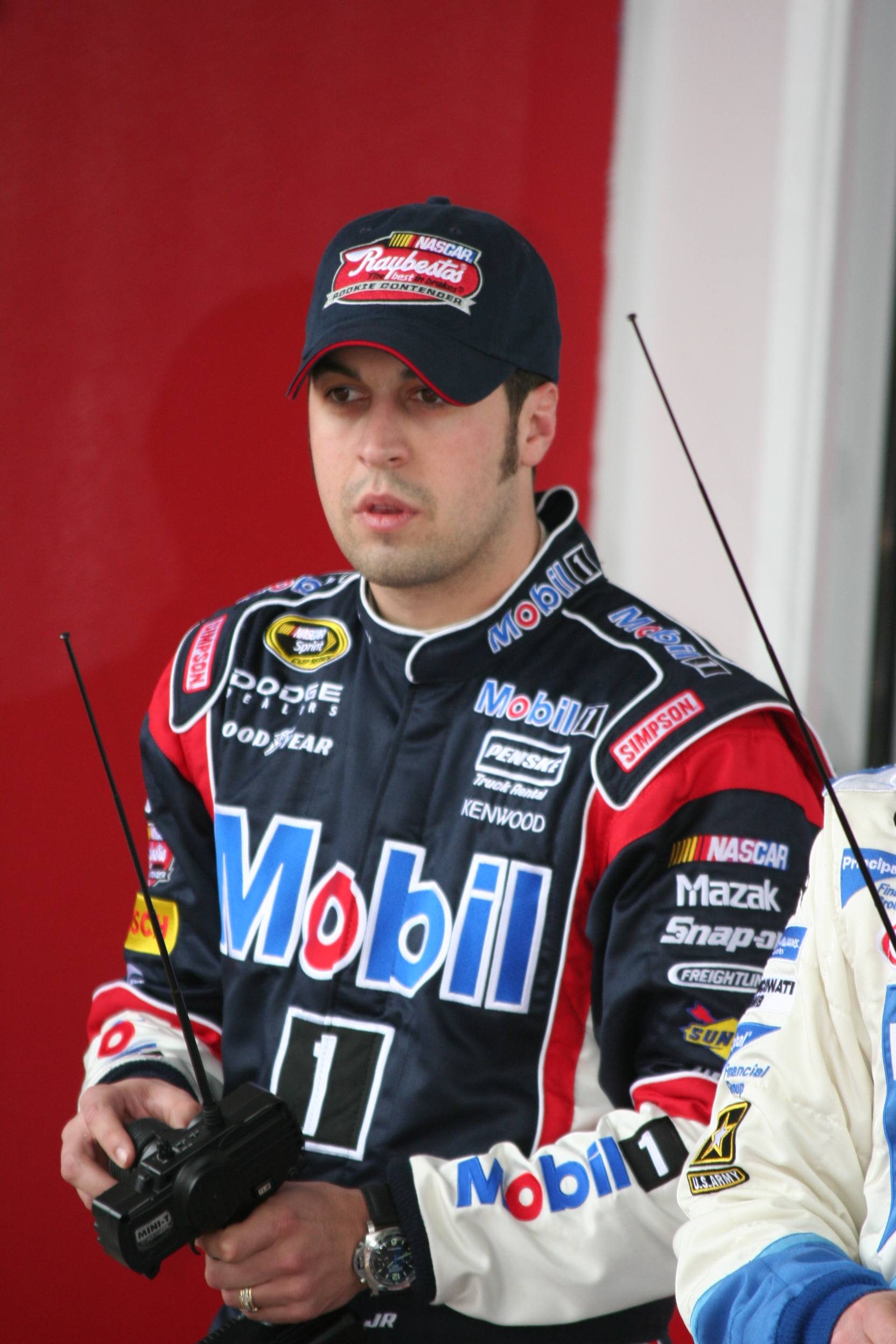
Sam Hornish Jr. (pictured in 2008) edged out Al Unser Jr. by 0.0024 seconds to win his fourth victory of the season.

De Ferran swerved to avoid Renna's lapped car, which slowed with no fuel pressure, and lost control of his vehicle entering turn two due to air catching his front wing. He sustained heavy car to his car's right-hand corner against the right-hand side concrete wall, and stopped on the backstretch. Debris from his car landed on the circuit, and he was briefly knocked unconscious. Safety crews turned off De Ferran's car so that the IRL medical team could transport him to the medical helicopter to St. James Hospital in Olympia Fields, Illinois with a concussion and a hairline fracture on his left wrist. During the 22-lap caution, the field made pit stops for tires, fuel, and new front wings for aerodynamic reasons. On the 74th lap, Unser returned the field to green flag racing. Hornish retook the lead from Unser on the inside in the third corner of that lap. Hornish's 0.6869-second lead was erased on lap 87 when Salazar's rear wing fell backward; he spun on the backstretch, but no other cars collided with him, prompting the third caution flag. Several drivers made pit stops for fuel, tires, and new front wings for aerodynamic purposes, as with the previous two cautions.

On lap 94, racing resumed, with Hornish leading the pack of cars into turn one. By the 108th lap, Castroneves had moved to sixth place. Six laps later, the fourth caution flag was waved due to debris on the track. Several drivers, including Hornish, went down pit road for tyres and fuel. Sharp won the race off pit road and took the lead for the lap 120 restart. Boat slowed in turn four on that lap due to an electrical problem that shut down his engine. He retired on pit lan. On the 136th lap, Hornish and Lazier were alongside each other at turn two in the battle for second place. Three laps later, Hornish passed Lazier for second. Sharp had been gained on by Hornish by lap 144, who got alongside him for the lead in the fourth turn. Sharp beat him by 0.0042 seconds on that lap. On the 145th lap, green flag pit stops began, with Lazier entering pit road for tyres and fuel. Six laps later, Sharp made his first pit stop. Daré collided with the right-hand side wall as he exited turn two on lap 153. His car was severely damaged in the rear, but he climbed out without assistance. The crash prompted the fifth (and final) caution flag. Pit stops for fuel and tyres were made under caution.

Castroneves led the field into the first turn at the lap 166 restart. On the following lap, Unser became the new leader with Hornish returning to second. Hornish retook the lead from Unser on the outside during the 169th lap. On the next lap, Unser attempted to re-pass Hornish but the latter responded by blocking his path. Unser overtook Hornish on lap 172, but the latter retook the lead before the start-finish line. During lap 173, Boesel passed Rice and Cheever to take sixth. On the 178th lap, Hornish went up the track slightly, and Unser moved underneath him to lead the lap. As the rest of the field formed into a pack, Hornish and Unser raced alongside each other and exchanged the lead for the remaining 21 laps but Hornish won his fourth race of the season and seventh in 35 IRL events. Hornish's margin of victory over Unser was 0.0024 seconds (about 3 in (76 mm)), the closest finish in IRL history, surpassing the record from the 2002 Boomtown 500 at Texas Motor Speedway that June. Lazier took third, beating Castroneves for the position on the final lap, and Cheever took fifth. Giaffone finished sixth and was mathematically eliminated from title contention. Sharp, Meira, Rice, and Wheldon completed the top ten finishers. The final classified finishers were Boesel, Barron, Mack (who had mid-race engine issues), and Ray. During the race, there were eighteen lead changes among four different drivers. Hornish led the most laps (102 total) on nine occasions.

=== Post-race ===
Hornish appeared in victory lane to celebrate his fourth victory of the season in front of the crowd; he earned $126,600 for winning the race. He said of his success at Chicagoland Speedway, "The fastest way around is to push another car around. But it's really hard to pass when you have to push a car aside. Having a guy that's experienced like Al, and all the races I've been in with him and all the respect I have for him, it's just like a high-speed pace lap." Hornish said he knew he was winner because he noticed Unser's front wing was behind his. Unser said he enjoyed competing against Hornish, and the duel reminded him of his close victory over Scott Goodyear at the 1992 Indianapolis 500, "We just came up short again. I honestly thought that we won the race. I thought I had him. It was that close. I tell you, they don't come any closer than that.", and, "That was the closest wheel-to-wheel racing I think you'll see in the country today. There are fenders on those cars down south for a reason, and that's to rub on each other." Third-placed Lazier revealed his team were out of sequence during the fuel pit stops but it later worked in their favor, "We were just running wheel to wheel, as close as you could get. I'd get a run on someone, and my momentum would be stopped, and four or five guys would get by me until I would get my momentum back. But if you're patient and you bide your time, then you'll start picking them off. It was a lot of fun out there, but it sure was hair-raising."

Cheever accused Castroneves of intentionally blocking him and putting him in danger during the event's final laps, "I want to sit down with (IRL vice president of operations) Brian (Barnhart) and show him the last laps with Helio Castroneves. I want Brian's opinion on whether or not that is blocking. He (Castroneves) totally moved me under the white line. Those aren't the rules of the game." Castroneves' response was, "As far as I'm concerned, my friend, I was racing, I was trying to be there and win the race and, hey, tough luck. In that particular time, he might be frustrated because he couldn't pass the guy and he tried to attack him. I know Eddie and hopefully he doesn't have any hard feelings." Nevertheless, he spoke of his hope that he would win the title at Texas the following weekend. Four days after the race, Castroneves and Rice were fined an undisclosed sum of money for violating IRL rules 8.1 and 8.3. Barnhardt said of his reasoning in issuing the fines, "What makes this type of racing possible is a code of ethics that's been developed by the drivers and Indy Racing League officials over the past seven years. Both Helio and Buddy displayed actions on the track during the race Sunday that were not appropriate."

De Ferran was released from hospital a day later following overnight observation. He was later deemed unfit by Henry Block, the IRL's director of medical services, to compete in the season-closing Chevy 500 at Texas Motor Speedway held the following week. Block stated that it was preferable not to put De Ferran in further danger due to his injuries, "Recovery periods for any type of concussion vary for many reasons, but rarely do symptoms completely disappear in seven to 10 days." De Ferran expressed his disappointment but stated that he would respect Block's decision. He was replaced by Championship Auto Racing Teams driver Max Papis for the Chevy 500. Giaffone was not perturbed at being eliminated from title contention, saying he felt his first season with Mo Nunn Racing went as better than expected. Redon said he did not know the cause of his engine failure. Hornish's victory erased his eight-point defiict to Castroneves and moved into the lead of the points standings, with 481 championship points. Castroneves dropped to second place with 469 championship points, while teammate De Ferran remained third with 443 championship points. Giaffone and Barron completed the top five with 419 and 336 championship points, respectively.

=== Race classification ===
Final race classification
Pos	No.	Driver	Team	Laps	Time/Retired	Grid	Points
1	4	Sam Hornish Jr. (USA)	Panther Racing	200	2:04.39.5354	1	52^{1}
2	7	Al Unser Jr. (USA)	Kelley Racing	200	+0.0024	3	40
3	91	Buddy Lazier (USA)	Hemelgarn Racing	200	+0.0596	22	35
4	3	Hélio Castroneves (BRA)	Team Penske	200	+0.1072	21	32
5	51	Eddie Cheever Jr. (USA)	Cheever Racing	200	+0.1584	6	30
6	21	Felipe Giaffone (BRA)	Mo Nunn Racing	200	+0.5240	10	28
7	8	Scott Sharp (USA)	Kelley Racing	200	+0.7270	16	26
8	2	Vítor Meira (BRA)	Team Menard	200	+0.8735	5	24
9	52	Buddy Rice (USA)	Cheever Racing	200	+0.8857	2	22
10	15	Dan Wheldon (GBR)	Panther Racing	200	+0.9387	7	20
11	12	Raul Boesel (BRA)	Bradley Motorsports	200	+1.1150	19	19
12	44	Alex Barron (USA)	Blair Racing	199	+1 Lap	18	18
13	55	Will Langhorne (USA)	Treadway Racing	180	Mechanical	23	17
14	31	George Mack (USA)	310 Racing	180	+20 Laps	24	16
15	78	Tony Renna (USA)	Kelley Racing	153	Crash	17	15
16	13	Airton Daré (BRA)	A. J. Foyt Enterprises	153	Crash	15	14
17	20	Greg Ray (USA)	Sam Schmidt Motorsports	140	+60 Laps	20	13
18	11	Eliseo Salazar (CHL)	A. J. Foyt Enterprises	131	Engine	14	12
19	98	Billy Boat (USA)	CURB Motorsports	120	Engine	4	11
20	24	Robbie Buhl (USA)	Dreyer & Reinbold Racing	113	Engine	9	10
21	9	Jeff Ward (USA)	Chip Ganassi Racing	106	Engine	13	9
22	23	Sarah Fisher (USA)	Dreyer & Reinbold Racing	61	Engine	12	8
23	6	Gil de Ferran (BRA)	Team Penske	51	Crash	11	7
24	28	Hideki Noda (JPN)	Indy Regency Racing	45	Handling	25	6
25	34	Laurent Redon (FRA)	Conquest Racing	14	Engine	8	5

Notes

- ^1 — Includes two bonus points for leading the most laps.

== Standings after the race ==
Drivers' Championship standings
Pos	+/–	Driver	Points
1	1	Sam Hornish Jr. (USA)	481
2	1	Hélio Castroneves (BRA)	469 (−12)
3	1	Gil de Ferran (BRA)	443 (−38)
4		Felipe Giaffone (BRA)	419 (−62)
5		Alex Barron (USA)	336 (−145)

- Note: Only the top five positions are included for the drivers' standings.
