= List of smallest winning margins in American open-wheel car racing =

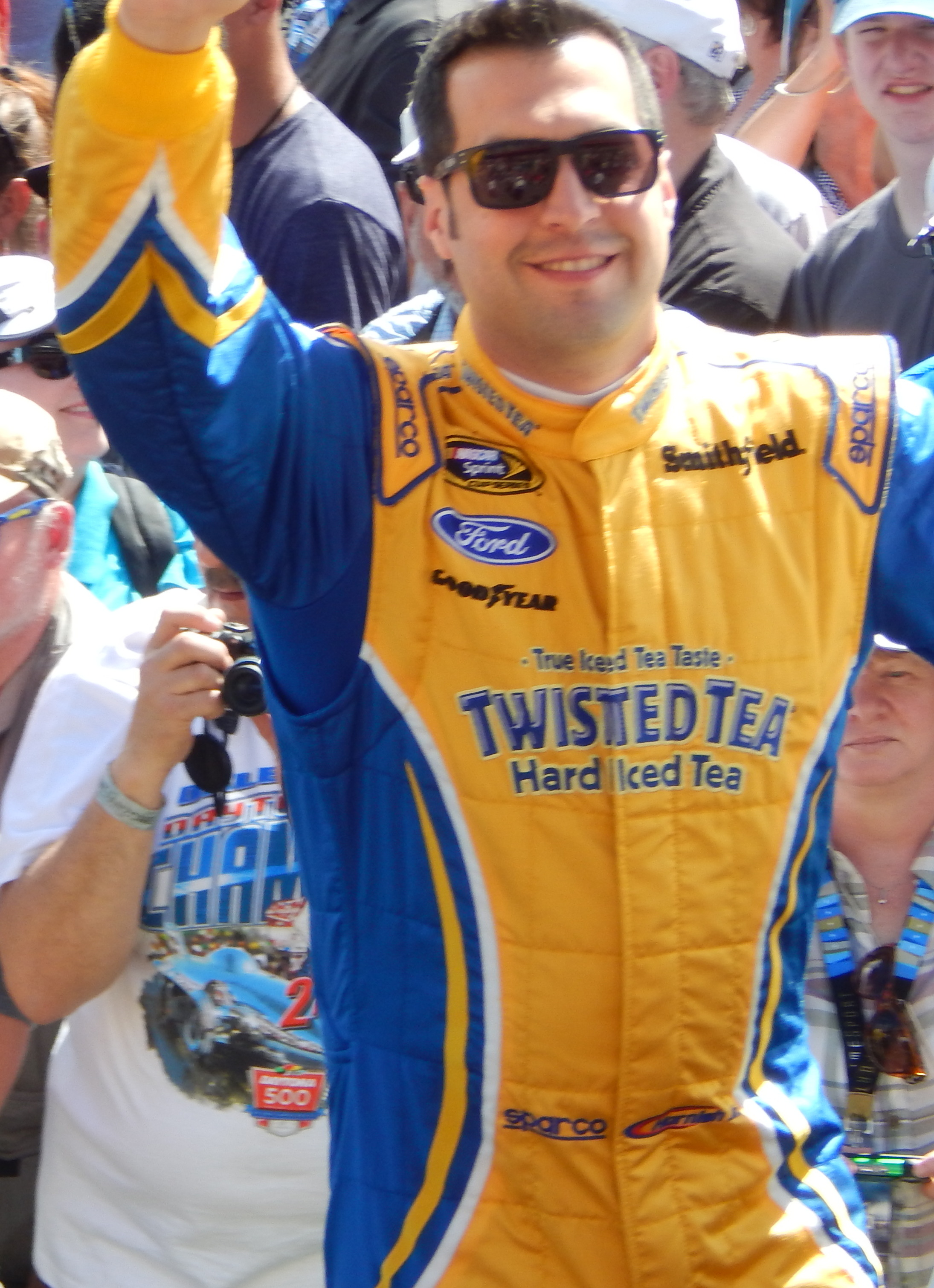
Sam Hornish Jr. (pictured in 2015) won the 2002 Delphi Indy 300 over Al Unser Jr. by 0.0024 seconds, the smallest margin of victory in Indy car racing history.

American open-wheel car racing, commonly referred to as Indy car racing, is a category of professional open-wheel auto racing in the United States. Since 1996, the highest class of American open-wheel car racing is the IndyCar Series, sanctioned by IndyCar. The "Indy" in the name refers to the series' premier event, the Indianapolis 500. The IndyCar Series schedule consists of purpose-built circuits, such as superspeedways, short ovals, and road courses, along with temporary street circuits.

The Indianapolis 500 played a crucial role in shaping the evolution of timing and scoring in American open‑wheel car racing. In the earliest years of the event, cars had to drive over a wire an inch off the ground, which would record the time of the lap into a paper card system. Yellow and green lights were installed around Indianapolis Motor Speedway in 1935 to warn drivers of an incident and mandate them to hold their positions until the track was cleaned. After many drivers found loopholes in this system, the United States Auto Club (USAC) introduced the Electro-PACER light number board system in 1972 to prevent passes under caution periods. By 1978, most Indy car races on oval circuits utilized a pace car to keep drivers from passing during cautions, and the Indianapolis 500 implemented the same rule a year later.

Computerized timing and scoring was first used by MCA TV in the 1969 Indianapolis 500 to present intervals between drivers during their closed-circuit broadcast of the race. USAC began using computerized scoring in the 1982 Indianapolis 500 with the introduction of the Dataspeed system, designed by IBM, which kept track of the amount of laps completed, running order, lap times, and fastest lap of the race down to a thousandth of a second, by manually pressing a button. The Dataspeed system was eventually replaced by the Dorian Automatic Timing Apparatus (DATA-1), the first fully-automated timing and scoring system in Indy car racing history, in the 1990 Indianapolis 500. With a network of radio transmitters, antennas, and computers, DATA-1 was capable of simultaneously tracking 40 cars and was accurate to a ten-thousandth of a second. Meanwhile, in 1991, Championship Auto Racing Teams (CART) adopted Electronic Data Systems (EDS)' scoring system, known as EDS Track, which was implemented on 14 of the series' tracks by the end of the season.

The Indy Racing League (IRL) was initially sanctioned by USAC upon its debut season in 1996, but after scoring blunders in the 1997 Indianapolis 500 and True Value 500, the IRL took over officiating duties for their events. While CART and its successor—the Champ Car World Series—scored to a thousandth of a second, the IRL began scoring every race down to the ten-thousandths digit in 2001, becoming one of the few motorsport series to do so. In 2004, the IRL acquired a camera which was positioned on the tracks' start-finish line and snapped photos every ten-thousandths of a second, acting as a backup to the electronic system already in place. The camera has since played a vital role in determining the winners of photo finishes, such as Buddy Rice in the 2004 Argent Mortgage Indy 300 and Hélio Castroneves in the 2008 Peak Antifreeze Indy 300.

As of 2026, the smallest margin between the first- and second-place finishers in Indy car racing occurred in the 2002 Delphi Indy 300 at Chicagoland Speedway, with Sam Hornish Jr. beating Al Unser Jr. for the victory by 0.0024 seconds. The high amount of downforce in IRL open-wheel cars created intense pack racing and photo finishes, eight of which took place in the 2000s decade and are currently included in the top-ten smallest winning margins in series history.

== Smallest margins ==
Smallest winning margins between first and second place
| Rank | Date | Sanction | Race | Track | Margin | First place | Second place | Ref |
|---|---|---|---|---|---|---|---|---|
| 1 | September 8, 2002 | IRL | Delphi Indy 300 | Chicagoland Speedway | 0.0024 | (United States) Sam Hornish Jr. | (United States) Al Unser Jr. | |
| 2 | September 7, 2008 | IRL | Peak Antifreeze Indy 300 | Chicagoland Speedway | 0.0033 | (Brazil) Hélio Castroneves | (New Zealand) Scott Dixon | |
| 3 | July 4, 2004 | IRL | Argent Mortgage Indy 300 | Kansas Speedway | 0.0051 | (United States) Buddy Rice | (Brazil) Vítor Meira | |
| 4 | August 29, 2009 | IRL | Peak Antifreeze & Motor Oil Indy 300 | Chicagoland Speedway | 0.0077 | (Australia) Ryan Briscoe | (New Zealand) Scott Dixon | |
| 5 | August 27, 2016 | IndyCar | Firestone 600 | Texas Motor Speedway | 0.0080 | (United States) Graham Rahal | (Canada) James Hinchcliffe | |
| 6 | September 15, 2002 | IRL | Chevy 500 | Texas Motor Speedway | 0.0096 | (United States) Sam Hornish Jr. | (Brazil) Hélio Castroneves | |
| 7 | October 2, 2011 | IndyCar | Kentucky Indy 300 | Kentucky Speedway | 0.0098 | (United States) Ed Carpenter | (United Kingdom) Dario Franchitti | |
| 8 | September 7, 2003 | IRL | Delphi Indy 300 | Chicagoland Speedway | 0.0099 | (United States) Sam Hornish Jr. | (New Zealand) Scott Dixon | |
| 9 | June 8, 2002 | IRL | Boomtown 500 | Texas Motor Speedway | 0.0111 | (United States) Jeff Ward | (United States) Al Unser Jr. | |
| 10 | July 3, 2005 | IRL | Argent Mortgage Indy 300 | Kansas Speedway | 0.0120 | (Brazil) Tony Kanaan | (United Kingdom) Dan Wheldon | |
| 11 | July 27, 2003 | IRL | Firestone Indy 400 | Michigan International Speedway | 0.0121 | (United States) Alex Barron | (United States) Sam Hornish Jr. | |
| 12 | September 11, 2005 | IRL | Peak Antifreeze Indy 300 | Chicagoland Speedway | 0.0133 | (United Kingdom) Dan Wheldon | (Brazil) Hélio Castroneves | |
| 13 | March 26, 2006 | IRL | Toyota Indy 300 | Homestead–Miami Speedway | 0.0147 | (United Kingdom) Dan Wheldon | (Brazil) Hélio Castroneves | |
| 14 | August 1, 2009 | IRL | Meijer Indy 300 | Kentucky Speedway | 0.0162 | (Australia) Ryan Briscoe | (United States) Ed Carpenter | |
| 15 | October 3, 2004 | IRL | Toyota Indy 400 | California Speedway | 0.0183 | (Mexico) Adrián Fernández | (Brazil) Tony Kanaan | |
| 16 | October 6, 2001 | IRL | Chevy 500 | Texas Motor Speedway | 0.0188 | (United States) Sam Hornish Jr. | (United States) Scott Sharp | |
| 17 | May 24, 2026 | IndyCar | Indianapolis 500 | Indianapolis Motor Speedway | 0.0233 | (Sweden) Felix Rosenqvist | (United States) David Malukas | |
| 18 | June 22, 1997 | CART | Budweiser / G.I. Joe's 200 | Portland International Raceway | 0.027 | (United Kingdom) Mark Blundell | (Brazil) Gil de Ferran | |
| 19 | March 24, 2002 | IRL | Yamaha Indy 400 | California Speedway | 0.0281 | (United States) Sam Hornish Jr. | (United States) Jaques Lazier | |
| 20 | July 25, 1999 | CART | U.S. 500 | Michigan International Speedway | 0.032 | (Brazil) Tony Kanaan | (Colombia) Juan Pablo Montoya | |
| 21 | July 31, 2005 | IRL | Firestone Indy 400 | Michigan International Speedway | 0.0374 | (United States) Bryan Herta | (United Kingdom) Dan Wheldon | |
| 22 | August 24, 2019 | IndyCar | Bommarito Automotive Group 500 | Gateway Motorsports Park | 0.0399 | (Japan) Takuma Sato | (United States) Ed Carpenter | |
| 23 | July 23, 2000 | CART | Michigan 500 | Michigan International Speedway | 0.040 | (Colombia) Juan Pablo Montoya | (United States) Michael Andretti | |
| 24 | August 28, 2010 | IRL | Peak Antifreeze & Motor Oil Indy 300 | Chicagoland Speedway | 0.0423 | (United Kingdom) Dario Franchitti | (United Kingdom) Dan Wheldon | |
| 25 | May 24, 1992 | USAC | Indianapolis 500 | Indianapolis Motor Speedway | 0.043^{1} | (United States) Al Unser Jr. | (Canada) Scott Goodyear | |
| 26 | June 11, 2011 | IndyCar | Firestone Twin 275s Race 1 | Texas Motor Speedway | 0.0527 | (United Kingdom) Dario Franchitti | (New Zealand) Scott Dixon | |
| 27 | June 11, 2005 | IRL | Bombardier Learjet 500 | Texas Motor Speedway | 0.0534 | (South Africa) Tomas Scheckter | (United States) Sam Hornish Jr. | |
| 28 | July 30, 1995 | CART | Michigan 500 | Michigan International Speedway | 0.056 | (United States) Scott Pruett | (United States) Al Unser Jr. | |
| 29 | August 15, 2004 | IRL | Belterra Casino Indy 300 | Kentucky Speedway | 0.0581 | (Mexico) Adrián Fernández | (United States) Buddy Rice | |
| 30 | June 11, 2000 | IRL | Casino Magic 500 | Texas Motor Speedway | 0.059 | (United States) Scott Sharp | (United States) Robby McGehee | |
| 31 | August 5, 2007 | IRL | Firestone Indy 400 | Michigan International Speedway | 0.0595 | (Brazil) Tony Kanaan | (United States) Marco Andretti | |
| 32 | May 25, 2014 | IndyCar | Indianapolis 500 | Indianapolis Motor Speedway | 0.0600 | (United States) Ryan Hunter-Reay | (Brazil) Hélio Castroneves | |
| 33 | May 28, 2006 | IRL | Indianapolis 500 | Indianapolis Motor Speedway | 0.0635 | (United States) Sam Hornish Jr. | (United States) Marco Andretti | |
| 34 | August 17, 1997 | IRL | Pennzoil 200 | New Hampshire Motor Speedway | 0.064 | (United States) Robbie Buhl | (Italy) Vincenzo Sospiri | |
| 35 | September 25, 2004 | CCWS | Bridgestone 400 | Las Vegas Motor Speedway | 0.066 | (France) Sébastien Bourdais | (Brazil) Bruno Junqueira | |
| 36 | March 20, 2022 | IndyCar | XPEL 375 | Texas Motor Speedway | 0.0669 | (United States) Josef Newgarden | (New Zealand) Scott McLaughlin | |
| 37 | June 24, 2007 | IRL | Iowa Corn Indy 250 | Iowa Speedway | 0.0681 | (United Kingdom) Dario Franchitti | (United States) Marco Andretti | |
| 38 | February 29, 2004 | IRL | Toyota Indy 300 | Homestead–Miami Speedway | 0.0698 | (United States) Sam Hornish Jr. | (Brazil) Hélio Castroneves | |
| 39 | September 12, 2004 | IRL | Delphi Indy 300 | Chicagoland Speedway | 0.0716 | (Mexico) Adrián Fernández | (United States) Bryan Herta | |
| 40 | March 15, 1998 | CART | Marlboro Grand Prix of Miami | Homestead–Miami Speedway | 0.075 | (United States) Michael Andretti | (Canada) Greg Moore | |
| 41 | August 14, 2005 | IRL | Amber Alert Portal Indy 300 | Kentucky Speedway | 0.0779 | (United States) Scott Sharp | (Brazil) Vítor Meira | |
| 42 | June 9, 2007 | IRL | Bombardier Learjet 550 | Texas Motor Speedway | 0.0786 | (United States) Sam Hornish Jr. | (Brazil) Tony Kanaan | |
| 43 | July 2, 2006 | IRL | Kansas Lottery Indy 300 | Kansas Speedway | 0.0793 | (United States) Sam Hornish Jr. | (United Kingdom) Dan Wheldon | |
| 44 | August 1, 2004 | IRL | Michigan Indy 400 | Michigan International Speedway | 0.0796 | (United States) Buddy Rice | (Brazil) Tony Kanaan | |
| 45 | June 7, 2003 | IRL | Bombardier 500 | Texas Motor Speedway | 0.0810 | (United States) Al Unser Jr. | (Brazil) Tony Kanaan | |
| 46 | May 11, 2003 | CART | German 500 | Lausitzring | 0.084 | (France) Sébastien Bourdais | (Mexico) Mario Domínguez | |
| 47 | August 11, 2002 | IRL | Belterra Casino Indy 300 | Kentucky Speedway | 0.0932 | (Brazil) Felipe Giaffone | (United States) Sam Hornish Jr. | |
| 48 | July 28, 2019 | IndyCar | Honda Indy 200 | Mid-Ohio Sports Car Course | 0.0934 | (New Zealand) Scott Dixon | (Sweden) Felix Rosenqvist | |
| 49 | May 28, 2023 | IndyCar | Indianapolis 500 | Indianapolis Motor Speedway | 0.0974 | (United States) Josef Newgarden | (Sweden) Marcus Ericsson | |
| 50 | May 24, 2015 | IndyCar | Indianapolis 500 | Indianapolis Motor Speedway | 0.1046 | (Colombia) Juan Pablo Montoya | (Australia) Will Power | |
| 51 | August 7, 2022 | IndyCar | Big Machine Music City Grand Prix | Streets of Nashville | 0.1067 | (New Zealand) Scott Dixon | (New Zealand) Scott McLaughlin | |
| 52 | October 16, 2005 | IRL | Toyota Indy 400 | California Speedway | 0.1117 | (United Kingdom) Dario Franchitti | (Brazil) Tony Kanaan | |
| 53 | July 15, 2006 | IRL | Firestone Indy 200 | Nashville Superspeedway | 0.1176 | (New Zealand) Scott Dixon | (United Kingdom) Dan Wheldon | |
| 54 | June 27, 1999 | IRL | Radisson 200 | Pikes Peak International Raceway | 0.120 | (United States) Greg Ray | (United States) Sam Schmidt | |
| 55 | October 15, 2000 | IRL | Excite 500 | Texas Motor Speedway | 0.140 | (Canada) Scott Goodyear | (United States) Eddie Cheever | |
| 56 | July 22, 1984 | CART | Michigan 500 | Michigan International Speedway | 0.14 | (United States) Mario Andretti | (United States) Tom Sneva | |
| 57 | August 29, 2020 | IndyCar | Bommarito Automotive Group 500 Race 1 | Gateway Motorsports Park | 0.1404 | (New Zealand) Scott Dixon | (Japan) Takuma Sato | |
| 58 | June 22, 2008 | IRL | Iowa Corn Indy 250 | Iowa Speedway | 0.1430 | (United Kingdom) Dan Wheldon | (Japan) Hideki Mutoh | |
| 59 | May 30, 1982 | USAC | Indianapolis 500 | Indianapolis Motor Speedway | 0.16 | (United States) Gordon Johncock | (United States) Rick Mears | |
| 60 | August 24, 2003 | IRL | Firestone Indy 225 | Nazareth Speedway | 0.1697 | (Brazil) Hélio Castroneves | (United States) Sam Hornish Jr. | |
| 61 | July 7, 2002 | IRL | Ameristar Casino Indy 200 | Kansas Speedway | 0.1741 | (Brazil) Airton Daré | (United States) Sam Hornish Jr. | |
| 62 | September 10, 2006 | IRL | Peak Antifreeze Indy 300 | Chicagoland Speedway | 0.1897 | (United Kingdom) Dan Wheldon | (New Zealand) Scott Dixon | |
| 63 | July 8, 2001 | IRL | Ameristar Casino Indy 200 | Kansas Speedway | 0.1976 | (United States) Eddie Cheever | (United States) Sam Hornish Jr. | |
| 64 | May 28, 2017 | IndyCar | Indianapolis 500 | Indianapolis Motor Speedway | 0.2011 | (Japan) Takuma Sato | (Brazil) Hélio Castroneves | |
| 65 | May 26, 2019 | IndyCar | Indianapolis 500 | Indianapolis Motor Speedway | 0.2086 | (France) Simon Pagenaud | (United States) Alexander Rossi | |
| 66 | June 29, 1997 | IRL | Samsonite 200 | Pikes Peak International Raceway | 0.222 | (United States) Tony Stewart | (France) Stéphan Grégoire | |
| 67 | July 12, 2025 | IndyCar | Synk 275 | Iowa Speedway | 0.2352 | (Mexico) Pato O'Ward | (United States) Josef Newgarden | |
| 68 | June 10, 2006 | IRL | Bombardier Learjet 500 | Texas Motor Speedway | 0.2402 | (Brazil) Hélio Castroneves | (New Zealand) Scott Dixon | |
| 69 | July 22, 2001 | CART | Harrah's 500 | Michigan International Speedway | 0.243 | (Canada) Patrick Carpentier | (United Kingdom) Dario Franchitti | |
| 70 | August 9, 1998 | CART | Miller Lite 200 | Mid-Ohio Sports Car Course | 0.247 | (Mexico) Adrián Fernández | (United States) Scott Pruett | |
| 71 | August 23, 2009 | IRL | Indy Grand Prix of Sonoma | Sonoma Raceway | 0.2488 | (United Kingdom) Dario Franchitti | (Australia) Ryan Briscoe | |
| 72 | June 12, 2004 | IRL | Bombardier 500 | Texas Motor Speedway | 0.2578 | (Brazil) Tony Kanaan | (United Kingdom) Dario Franchitti | |
| 73 | July 26, 1998 | CART | U.S. 500 | Michigan International Speedway | 0.259 | (Canada) Greg Moore | (United States) Jimmy Vasser | |
| 74 | May 1, 2021 | IndyCar | Genesys 300 | Texas Motor Speedway | 0.2646 | (New Zealand) Scott Dixon | (New Zealand) Scott McLaughlin | |
| 75 | September 1, 2002 | CART | Shell Grand Prix of Denver | Streets of Denver | 0.282 | (Brazil) Bruno Junqueira | (New Zealand) Scott Dixon | |
| 76 | August 25, 1991 | CART | Texaco / Havoline Grand Prix of Denver | Streets of Denver | 0.287 | (United States) Al Unser Jr. | (Brazil) Emerson Fittipaldi | |
| 77 | May 25, 2003 | IRL | Indianapolis 500 | Indianapolis Motor Speedway | 0.2990 | (Brazil) Gil de Ferran | (Brazil) Hélio Castroneves | |
| 78 | April 17, 2016 | IndyCar | Toyota Grand Prix of Long Beach | Streets of Long Beach | 0.3032 | (France) Simon Pagenaud | (New Zealand) Scott Dixon | |
| 79 | July 1, 2001 | CART | Marconi Grand Prix of Cleveland | Burke Lakefront Airport | 0.305 | (United Kingdom) Dario Franchitti | (Mexico) Memo Gidley | |
| 80 | April 23, 1995 | CART | Bosch Spark Plug Grand Prix | Nazareth Speedway | 0.308 | (Brazil) Emerson Fittipaldi | (Canada) Jacques Villeneuve | |
| 81 | June 27, 2009 | IRL | SunTrust Indy Challenge | Richmond Raceway | 0.3109 | (New Zealand) Scott Dixon | (United Kingdom) Dario Franchitti | |
| 82 | September 24, 2005 | CCWS | Champ Car Hurricane Relief 400 | Las Vegas Motor Speedway | 0.312 | (France) Sébastien Bourdais | (Spain) Oriol Servià | |
| 83 | March 15, 2026 | IndyCar | Java House Grand Prix of Arlington | Streets of Arlington | 0.3140 | (United States) Kyle Kirkwood | (Spain) Álex Palou | |
| 84 | October 15, 2000 | CART | Honda Indy 300 | Surfers Paradise Street Circuit | 0.324 | (Mexico) Adrián Fernández | (Sweden) Kenny Bräck | |
| 85 | May 29, 1999 | CART | Motorola 300 | Gateway Motorsports Park | 0.329 | (United States) Michael Andretti | (Brazil) Hélio Castroneves | |
| 86 | May 31, 2014 | IndyCar | Chevrolet Indy Dual in Detroit Race 1 | Raceway at Belle Isle Park | 0.3308 | (Australia) Will Power | (United States) Graham Rahal | |
| 87 | August 31, 2003 | CART | Centrix Financial Grand Prix of Denver | Streets of Denver | 0.335 | (Brazil) Bruno Junqueira | (France) Sébastien Bourdais | |
| 88 | May 26, 2024 | IndyCar | Indianapolis 500 | Indianapolis Motor Speedway | 0.3417 | (United States) Josef Newgarden | (Mexico) Pato O'Ward | |
| 89 | September 13, 1998 | CART | Honda Grand Prix of Monterey | Laguna Seca | 0.343 | (United States) Bryan Herta | (Italy) Alex Zanardi | |
| 90 | June 11, 1995 | CART | ITT Automotive Grand Prix of Detroit | Raceway at Belle Isle Park | 0.345 | (United States) Robby Gordon | (United States) Jimmy Vasser | |
| 91 | May 5, 2013 | IndyCar | São Paulo Indy 300 | Streets of São Paulo | 0.3463 | (Canada) James Hinchcliffe | (Japan) Takuma Sato | |
| 92 | July 21, 2024 | IndyCar | Honda Indy Toronto | Exhibition Place | 0.3469 | (United States) Colton Herta | (United States) Kyle Kirkwood | |
| 93 | June 1, 1997 | CART | Miller 200 | Milwaukee Mile | 0.348 | (Canada) Greg Moore | (United States) Michael Andretti | |
| 94 | September 21, 2003 | IRL | Toyota Indy 400 | California Speedway | 0.3563 | (United States) Sam Hornish Jr. | (New Zealand) Scott Dixon | |
| 95 | November 1, 1998 | CART | Marlboro 500 | California Speedway | 0.360 | (United States) Jimmy Vasser | (Canada) Greg Moore | |
| 96 | May 6, 2001 | CART | Lehigh Valley Grand Prix | Nazareth Speedway | 0.366 | (New Zealand) Scott Dixon | (Sweden) Kenny Bräck | |
| 97 | October 17, 2004 | IRL | Chevy 500 | Texas Motor Speedway | 0.3732 | (Brazil) Hélio Castroneves | (Brazil) Tony Kanaan | |
| 98 | July 17, 2004 | IRL | Firestone Indy 200 | Nashville Superspeedway | 0.3755 | (Brazil) Tony Kanaan | (United States) Sam Hornish Jr. | |
| 99 | April 13, 1986 | CART | Toyota Grand Prix of Long Beach | Long Beach Street Circuit | 0.380 | (United States) Michael Andretti | (United States) Al Unser Jr. | |
| 100 | July 24, 2005 | IRL | ABC Supply Co. / A. J. Foyt 225 | Milwaukee Mile | 0.3836 | (United States) Sam Hornish Jr. | (United Kingdom) Dario Franchitti | |

Notes

- Only the 100 closest margins are included.
- ^1 – According to USAC technical director Mike Devin, the actual margin of victory between Al Unser Jr. and Scott Goodyear is 0.0331 seconds. The discrepancy arose because Unser Jr.'s transponder box was located in the nose of his car, whereas Goodyear's transponder box was placed in the sidepod of his car. Track officials opted to report the margin of 0.043 seconds as the official difference between Unser Jr. and Goodyear.
