= Will Langhorne =

William Langhorne
- Born: July 29, 1974 (age 52) Washington, D.C., United States
- Years active: 1997–2006
- Starts: 3
- Wins: 0
- Poles: 0

William Langhorne (born July 29, 1974, in Washington, D.C.), is a race car driver sponsored by Porsche. He is also a former driver in the Indy Racing League. After coming up through karting and the Skip Barber Racing Schools, he drove in the Barber Dodge Pro Series from 1997 to 1999 and the Toyota Atlantic in 1999 and 2000. He reached his goal of top-level open-wheel racing when he competed in the 2002 IRL season with three starts for Treadway Racing. His best career IRL finish was in thirteenth position in the Delphi Indy 300 at the Chicagoland Speedway. In 2003, he raced in Formula 3000 for BCN Competicion. In 2004 and 2005, he raced in the ARCA ReMax Series. In 2006, he raced for Molitor Racing in the Porsche Michelin Supercup Series that tours with Formula One.

Langhorne is an alumnus of Burke Mountain Academy and Babson College.

== Racing record ==
=== American Open Wheel ===
(key)

==== Indy Racing League ====
Year	Team	Chassis	Engine	1	2	3	4	5	6	7	8	9	10	11	12	13	14	15	Pos.	Pts	Ref
2002	Treadway Racing	G-Force GF05B	Chevrolet Indy V8	HMS	PHX	FON	NZR	INDY	TXS	PPIR	RIR	KAN	NSH	MCH	KTY; 18	STL	CHI; 13	TX2; 23	**35th**	**36**	

=== Complete Porsche Supercup results ===
(key) (Races in bold indicate pole position) (Races in italics indicate fastest lap)

Year	Team	1	2	3	4	5	6	7	8	9	10	11	12	13	Pos.	Pts
2002	Kadach Tuning + Service	ITA	ESP	AUT	MON	GER	GBR	GER	HUN	BEL	ITA	USA; Ret	USA; 12		NC	0‡
2006	MRS-PC Service Team PZM	BHR	ITA	GER	ESP	MON	GBR	USA; 11	USA; 14	FRA; 15	GER; 15	HUN; 16	ITA; 15		NC	0‡
2007	MRS Team	BHR; 13	BHR; 15	ESP; 27	MON; 10	FRA; 9	GBR; 24	GER; 19	HUN; 22	TUR; 9	BEL; 17	ITA; 15			16th	33
2008	Veltins MRS Racing	BHR	BHR	ESP	TUR	MON	FRA	GBR	GER; 21	HUN; 18	ESP; Ret	BEL; 16	ITA; 13		NC	0‡
2009	SANITEC Racing	BHR; 7	BHR; 12	ESP; Ret	MON; 13	TUR; 11	GBR; Ret	GER; 15	HUN; 10	ESP; 7	BEL; 11	ITA; 12	UAE; 8	UAE; 14	12th	72
2010	SANITEC GILTRAP Racing	BHR; 16	BHR; 16	ESP; 13	MON; 16	ESP; Ret	GBR; 16	GER; 14	HUN; Ret	BEL; 13	ITA; 14				18th	25
2011	SANITEC Aquiles MRS Team	TUR; 14	ESP; Ret	MON; 16	GER; 13	GBR; 20	GER; 10	HUN; 14	BEL; 19	ITA; 17	UAE; 16	UAE; 16			15th	33
2012	MRS GT-Racing	BHR	BHR	MON; 13	ESP	GBR	GER	HUN	HUN	BEL	ITA				21st	6

=== Complete International Formula 3000 results ===
(key) (Races in bold indicate pole position; races in italics indicate fastest lap.)

Year	Entrant	1	2	3	4	5	6	7	8	9	10	Pos.	Pts
2003	BCN F3000	IMO	CAT	A1R	MON; 10	NÜR; 12	MAG; 14	SIL; 13	HOC; 12	HUN	MNZ	NC	0

=== ARCA Re/Max Series ===
(key) (Bold – Pole position awarded by qualifying time. Italics – Pole position earned by points standings or practice time. * – Most laps led.)

ARCA Re/Max Series results
Year	Team	No.	Make	1	2	3	4	5	6	7	8	9	10	11	12	13	14	15	16	17	18	19	20	21	22	23	ARMSC	Pts	Ref
2004	Brent Sherman Racing	04	Ford	DAY	NSH	SLM	KEN	TOL	CLT	KAN	POC	MCH	SBO	BLN	KEN	GTW	POC	LER	NSH	ISF	TOL; 13	DSF	CHI	SLM; 24	TAL		87th	280	
2005	Lee Leslie	44	Ford	DAY	NSH	SLM	KEN	TOL	LAN	MIL	POC	MCH	KAN	KEN	BLN	POC	GTW	LER	NSH	MCH	ISF	TOL; 25	DSF	CHI			92nd	285	
2005	Bob Schacht Motorsports	75	Ford																						SLM; 11	TAL	92nd	285	
