= 1997 Atlantic Championship =

1997 Toyota Atlantic Championship season
- KOOL Toyota Atlantic Championship

Season
- Races: 12
- Start date: March 1st
- End date: September 6th

Awards
- Drivers' champion: (United States) Alex Barron

The 1997 Toyota Atlantic Championship season was contested over 12 rounds. All teams had to utilize Toyota engines. The KOOL Toyota Atlantic Championship Drivers' Champion was Alex Barron driving for Lynx Racing. In C2-class 14 different drivers competed, but none of them for the whole season.

== Calendar ==
Race No	Track	State	Date	Laps	Distance	Time	Speed	Winner	Pole position	Most leading laps	Fastest race lap
1	Homestead	Florida	March 1, 1997	50	2.25302=112.651 km	0'49:36.520	136.248 km/h	Anthony Lazzaro	Chuck West	Case Montgomery	Bertrand Godin
2	Long Beach	California	April 12, 1997	30	2.558787=76.76361 km	1'07:00.264	68.739 km/h	Alexandre Tagliani	Case Montgomery	Alexandre Tagliani	Alexandre Tagliani
3	Nazareth	Pennsylvania	April 26, 1997	60	1.5223978=91.343868 km	0'42:20.224	129.452 km/h	Alex Barron	Alex Barron	Alex Barron	?
4	Milwaukee	Wisconsin	May 31, 1997	60	1.6607976=99.647856 km	0'31:40.276	188.779 km/h	Alex Barron	Alex Barron	Alex Barron	Bertrand Godin
5	Montréal	Canada	June 14, 1997	27	4.4207471=119.3601717 km	0'45:08.587	158.642 km/h	Bertrand Godin	Bertrand Godin	Bertrand Godin	Chuck West
6	Cleveland	Ohio	July 13, 1997	22	3.3891858=74.5620876 km	0'33:40.036	132.881 km/h	Bertrand Godin	Alexandre Tagliani	Bertrand Godin	Tony Ave
7	Toronto	Canada	July 19, 1997	35	2.7696053=96.9361855 km	0'59:56.560	97.029 km/h	Memo Gidley	Alex Barron	Alex Barron	Alexandre Tagliani
8	Trois-Rivières	Canada	August 3, 1997	45	2.4477453=110.1485385 km	1'00:27.668	109.308 km/h	Alexandre Tagliani	Alexandre Tagliani	Alexandre Tagliani	Alex Barron
9	Lexington	Ohio	August 10, 1997	25	3.6337994=90.844985 km	0'40:55.747	133.174 km/h	Alex Barron	Jeret Schroeder	Alex Barron	Alex Barron
10	Elkhart Lake	Wisconsin	August 17, 1997	11	6.4372=70.8092 km	0'40:34.741	104.698 km/h	Alex Barron	Chuck West	Alex Barron	Alex Barron
11	Vancouver	Canada	September 1, 1997	38	2.7406379=104.1442402 km	0'58:24.852	106.971 km/h	Memo Gidley	Memo Gidley	Memo Gidley	Alex Barron
12	Monterey	California	September 6, 1997	28	3.6016134=100.8451752 km	0'37:50.484	159.897 km/h	Alex Barron	Alex Barron	Alex Barron	Alex Barron

Note:

Race 1 held on the road course.

Race 10 stopped earlier due to rain, originally scheduled over 17 laps.

== Final points standings ==
=== Driver ===
==== Main championship ====
For every race the points were awarded: 20 points to the winner, 16 for runner-up, 14 for third place, 12 for fourth place, 11 for fifth place, winding down to 1 point for 15th place. Lower placed drivers did not award points. Additional points were awarded to the pole winner (1 point) and to the driver leading the most laps (1 point). C2-class drivers were also able to score points in the main class.

Place	Name	Country	Team	Chassis	Total points	(United States)	(United States)	(United States)	(United States)	(Canada)	(United States)	(Canada)	(Canada)	(United States)	(United States)	(Canada)	(United States)
1	Alex Barron	United States	Lynx Racing	Ralt	178	-	-	22	22	16	14	12	14	21	21	14	22
2	Memo Gidley	United States	Lynx Racing	Ralt	136	16	9	-	14	14	7	20	11	12	11	22	-
3	Alexandre Tagliani	Canada	Forsythe Racing	Ralt	123	8	21	14	6	-	1	16	22	9	10	2	14
4	Bertrand Godin	Canada	Forsythe Racing	Ralt	121	11	-	6	9	22	21	9	4	16	12	9	2
5	Case Montgomery	United States	Dells Racing	Ralt	100	15	7	16	-	-	16	14	7	6	7	12	-
6	Steve Knapp	United States	P-1 Racing	Ralt	99	10	11	12	4	-	8	5	8	11	14	16	-
7	João Barbosa	Portugal	RDS Motorsport	Ralt	94	12	12	4	3	-	9	12	16	10	16	-	-
8	Anthony Lazzaro	United States	Phillips Motorsport	Ralt	92	20	16	-	10	11	5	-	12	8	-	10	-
9	Jeret Schroeder	United States	PPI Motorsports	Ralt	70	-	-	8	8	-	12	8	-	15	8	-	11
10	Eric Lang	United States	D&L Racing	Ralt	64	7	7	5	5	12	3	3	5	1	-	8	8
11	David Pook	United States	BDJS	Ralt	59	-	-	10	16	10	-	6	-	-	-	1	16
12	Kenny Wilden	United States	P-1 Racing	Ralt	55	-	-	2	-	-	4	7	10	5	6	11	10
13	Tony Ave	United States	Olsson Engineering	Ralt	53	5	-	11	12	5	11	-	-	-	9	-	-
14	Chuck West	United States	World Speed Motorsports	Ralt	46	1	10	-	11	-	10	-	6	-	1	-	7
15	Bill Auberlen	United States	BDJS	Ralt	38	9	14	-	-	4	-	11	-	-	-	-	-
16	Cam Binder	Canada	Binder Racing	Ralt	38	6	-	-	-	6	6	4	-	-	-	7	9
17	Michael David	United States	PDR Enterprises	Ralt	30	-	-	9	-	-	-	1	-	4	4	-	12
18	Ted Sahley	United States	Sahley Racing	Ralt	23	-	-	-	-	8	1	-	-	7	1	-	6
19	Robert Sollenskrog	Sweden	BRS Motorsports	Ralt	18	-	-	7	2	9	-	-	-	-	-	-	-
20	Mark Tague	United States	World Speed Motorsports	Ralt	17	-	-	-	-	1	2	-	-	3	2	4	5
21	Joe Sposato	United States	Sposato Motor Racing	Ralt	13	2	5	-	-	-	-	-	-	2	-	-	4
22	Dave Cutler	United States	Dells Racing	Ralt	13	4	-	3	-	3	-	-	-	-	-	3	-
23	Chris Smith	United States	PPI Motorsports	Ralt	11	-	-	-	-	-	-	2	9	-	-	-	-
24	Leo Parente	United States	PPI Motorsports	Ralt	9	-	-	1	1	7	-	-	-	-	-	-	-
25	Charles Nearburg	United States	Nearburg Racing	Ralt	8	-	8	-	-	-	-	-	-	-	-	-	-
26	Frank Allers	Canada	Johnston Engineering	Reynard	8	3	-	-	-	-	-	-	-	-	-	5	-
	David Rutledge	Canada	Binder Racing	Ralt	8	-	-	-	-	-	-	-	-	-	5	-	3
28	Stuart Crow	United States	BDJS	Ralt	7	-	-	-	7	-	-	-	-	-	-	-	-
29	John Rutherford	United States	Shank Racing	Ralt	6	-	-	-	-	-	-	-	-	-	-	6	-
30	Joaqui DeSoto	United States	Weld Motorsports	Reynard	5	3	-	-	-	-	-	-	2	-	-	-	-
31	Peter MacLeod	United States	Team Medlin	Ralt	4	-	4	-	-	-	-	-	-	-	-	-	-
32	Steve Forrer	United States	Forrer Racing	Ralt	4	1	-	-	-	-	-	-	-	-	3	-	-
33	Carol Soucy	Canada	Scalzo Racing	Ralt	3	-	-	-	-	-	-	-	3	-	-	-	-
34	Ian Bland	Australia	Kaditcha Racing	Ralt	2	-	2	-	-	-	-	-	-	-	-	-	-
	Sergei Szortyka	United States	J&J Racing	Ralt	2	-	-	-	-	2	-	-	-	-	-	-	-
36	Peat Hidalgo	United States	Binder Racing	Ralt	1	-	1	-	-	-	-	-	-	-	-	-	-
	Stéphane Roy	Canada	Cogan Motorsports	Raven	1	-	-	-	-	-	-	-	1	-	-	-	-
	Mattias Andersson	Sweden	BRS Motorsport	Ralt	1	-	-	-	-	-	-	-	-	-	-	-	1

==== C2-Class championship ====
Points system see above. But additional points only awarded for the fastest qualifier. No additional point awarded to the driver leading the most laps.

Place	Name	Country	Team	Chassis	Total points	(United States)	(United States)	(United States)	(United States)	(Canada)	(United States)	(Canada)	(Canada)	(United States)	(United States)	(Canada)	(United States)
1	Joaquin DeSoto	United States	Weld Motorsports	Reynard	159	21	-	15	21	10	21	16	21	17	17	-	-
2	James Irwin	United States	Riverside Motorsports	Reynard	86	-	-	-	16	20	16	20	-	14	-	-	-
3	Howie Liebengood	United States	HL Swift Racing	Swift	81	-	-	16	14	-	11	-	-	20	20	-	-
4	Frank Allers	Canada	Johnston Engineering	Reynard	66	-	21	-	-	12	-	12	-	-	-	21	-
5	Jimmy Pugliese	United States	Hunter-Smith/Pugliese Motorsports	Swift	62	-	-	-	-	16	-	14	16	-	-	16	-
6	Greg Harrington	United States	Harrington Racing	Swift	56	12	-	20	-	-	12	12	-	-	-	-	-
7	Michael Simpson	United States	Simpson Motorsports	Swift	47	-	12	-	-	-	14	-	-	-	-	-	21
8	Dan Vosloo	United States	Danvo Racing	Reynard	28	14	14	-	-	-	-	-	-	-	-	-	-
	Brian Dunkel	United States	Marathon Inc.	Swift	28	-	-	-	-	14	-	-	-	-	14	-	-
10	Marcelo Gaffoglio	Brazil	TGF Racing	Reynard	23	-	11	-	-	12	-	-	-	-	-	-	-
11	Mike Sauce	United States	HL Swift Racing	Swift	16	16	-	-	-	-	-	-	-	-	-	-	-
	Buddy Brundo	United States	Hammerhead Racing	Swift	16	-	16	-	-	-	-	-	-	-	-	-	-
13	Bob McGregor	United States	McGregor Racing	Reynard	14	-	-	-	-	-	-	-	-	-	-	14	-
14	Rick Ferguson	United States	Crone Racing	Swift	10	-	10	-	-	-	-	-	-	-	-	-	-

Note:

No more competitors in C2-class.

== See also ==
- 1997 CART season
- 1997 Indy Lights season
- 1996–1997 Indy Racing League season
