= George Mack =

American racing driver

- Nationality: American
- Born: July 21, 1968 (age 58) Hollywood, California, U.S.

Indy Racing League IndyCar Series
- Years active: 2002
- Teams: 310 Racing
- Starts: 15
- Wins: 0
- Poles: 0
- Best finish: 16th in 2002

George Mack (born July 21, 1968, in Hollywood, California) is a former Indy Racing League driver. He is the older brother of Indy Pro Series and short track racer Lloyd Mack.

Mack was the second African-American after Willy T. Ribbs to drive in the Indianapolis 500 when he did so in 2002 and finished seventeenth. He contested the rest IRL season for 310 Racing and finished sixteenth in series points with a best finish of thirteenth. After being unable to find a ride in open wheel cars after 310 Racing folded, he shifted his focus to NASCAR and was named the third driver of the Curry Racing entry in the Truck Series in early 2006, possibly as a part of the Drive for Diversity program. However, Mack denied association with Curry Racing stating that he was not contracted and/or scheduled to drive for Curry Racing.

Mack appeared in an episode of the reality TV show, Blind Date where he dated a girl who referred to herself as Q, a reference to the James Bond character.

== Racing record ==
=== American Open Wheel ===
(key)

==== IndyCar results ====
Year	Team	1	2	3	4	5	6	7	8	9	10	11	12	13	14	15	Rank	Points	Ref
2002	310 Racing	HMS; 13	PHX; 20	FON; 16	NZR; 18	INDY; 17	TXS; 21	PPIR; 13	RIR; 20	KAN; 18	NSH; 15	MIS; 20	KTY; 17	STL; 16	CHI; 14	TX2; 28	16th	184	
