= Alex Barron (racing driver) =

American racing driver

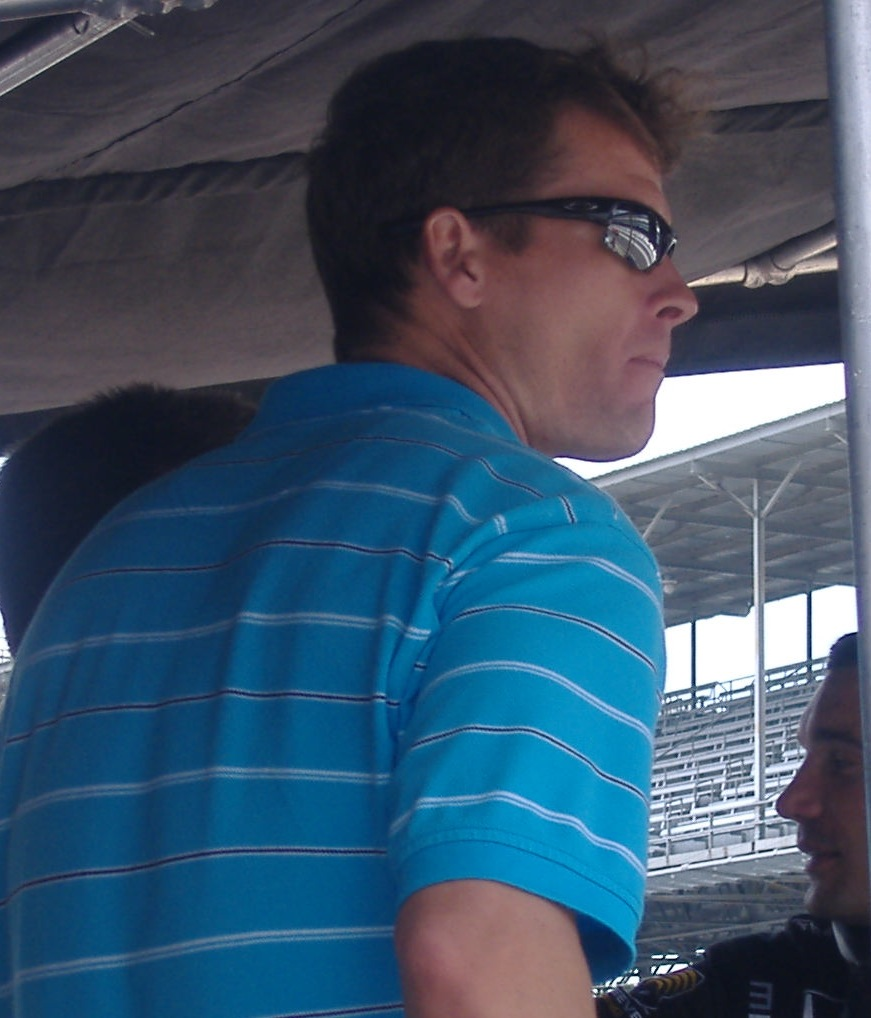
- Barron at the Indianapolis Motor Speedway in 2006
- Nationality: (United States) American
- Born: June 11, 1970 (age 56) San Diego, California, U.S.

IRL IndyCar Series
- Categorisation: FIA Silver
- Years active: 2001–2005, 2007
- Teams: Sam Schmidt Motorsports; Blair Racing; Penske Racing; Mo Nunn Racing; Team Cheever; CURB/Agajanian/Beck Motorsports
- Starts: 62
- Wins: 2
- Poles: 0
- Best finish: 5th in 2002

CART Championship Car
- Years active: 1998–2001
- Teams: All American Racers; Penske Racing; Dale Coyne Racing; Arciero-Blair Racing
- Starts: 34
- Wins: 0
- Poles: 0
- Best finish: 26th in 2000

Previous series
- 1997 1996: Toyota Atlantic; U.S. National Formula Ford 2000

Championship titles
- 1997: Toyota Atlantic Championship

Alex Joseph Barron (born June 11, 1970) is an American former race car driver. He began racing CART FedEx World Series Championship cars in 1998 and made his first Indy Racing League Northern Lights Series (now IndyCar Series) start in 2001.

== Racing career ==
=== Early years ===
Barron was born in San Diego, California. In 1996, the opportunity for him to move up to US National Formula Ford 2000 came with the DSTP Team. This proved to be a steep learning curve from kart to open wheel race car, for the young racer. However, a podium, a fastest lap and six top-ten finishes won him to chance to race in Toyota Atlantic the following season.

Barron in his rookie season in the KOOL Toyota Atlantic series, surprised everyone, including his team, Lynx Racing by dominating and winning the 1997 championship, taking five victories along the way. With four pole positions, six fastest laps and nine top three finishes, he would also win the “Rookie of the Year” award.

Part of Barron's prize for winning the Championship was a test with the Arciero-Wells Racing CART team. During his test, he was quickly matching the speed of their regular driver, Max Papis. Arciero-Wells were so impressed with him, they offered a testing contract. Following the retirement of Juan Manuel Fangio II, the All American Racers Team and their boss, Dan Gurney, wanted a young American driver who could develop with the team, and Barron got the call.

In just 24 races, twelve races in both the Formula Ford 2000 and Toyota Atlantic, Barron made the jump from racing karts to CART.

=== Indycars ===
Barron's time with Gurney and his AAR team was a troubled by an uncompetitive combination of the chassis (they used both Eagle and Reynard chassis), Toyota engines and Goodyear tyres. Midway through his second season (1999) with AAR, he was let go. Later that season, he was signed by Marlboro Team Penske to race in two 500 mile events. Once again he found himself in an uncompetitive combination, this time it was a Penske PC27B-99 with Mercedes engines and Goodyears.

It was not until the second half of 2000 season that Barron reappeared in CART, running with Dale Coyne Racing. The following season, he raced just the final two races for Arciero-Blair Racing. During these races, Alex led both, before retiring with problems the Ford Cosworth engines both times.

In 2002, Barron switched to the IRL, signing for Blair Racing, where he finish fourth in Indianapolis 500, co-winning the Rookie of the Year. Later that season, he would earn the first of his two IndyCar Series wins, the 2002 Firestone Indy 200 at Nashville Speedway. Sadly, Blair Racing would fold at the end of the season, leaving Barron without a full-time drive for 2003. In 2003, Barron drove for three teams. After replacing the injured Gil de Ferran for a one-off appearance for Marlboro Team Penske, he raced for Mo Nunn Racing, filling in for the injured Felipe Giaffone. It was with Mo Nunn that Barron scored his second IRL victory, in the 2003 Firestone Indy 400 at Michigan International Speedway. For the final three races of that season, Eddie Cheever hired Barron to drive for his Red Bull Cheever Racing outfit, instead of Buddy Rice. In his first race for Cheever, he gave the team their best finish of the season, seventh place at the Chicagoland Speedway.

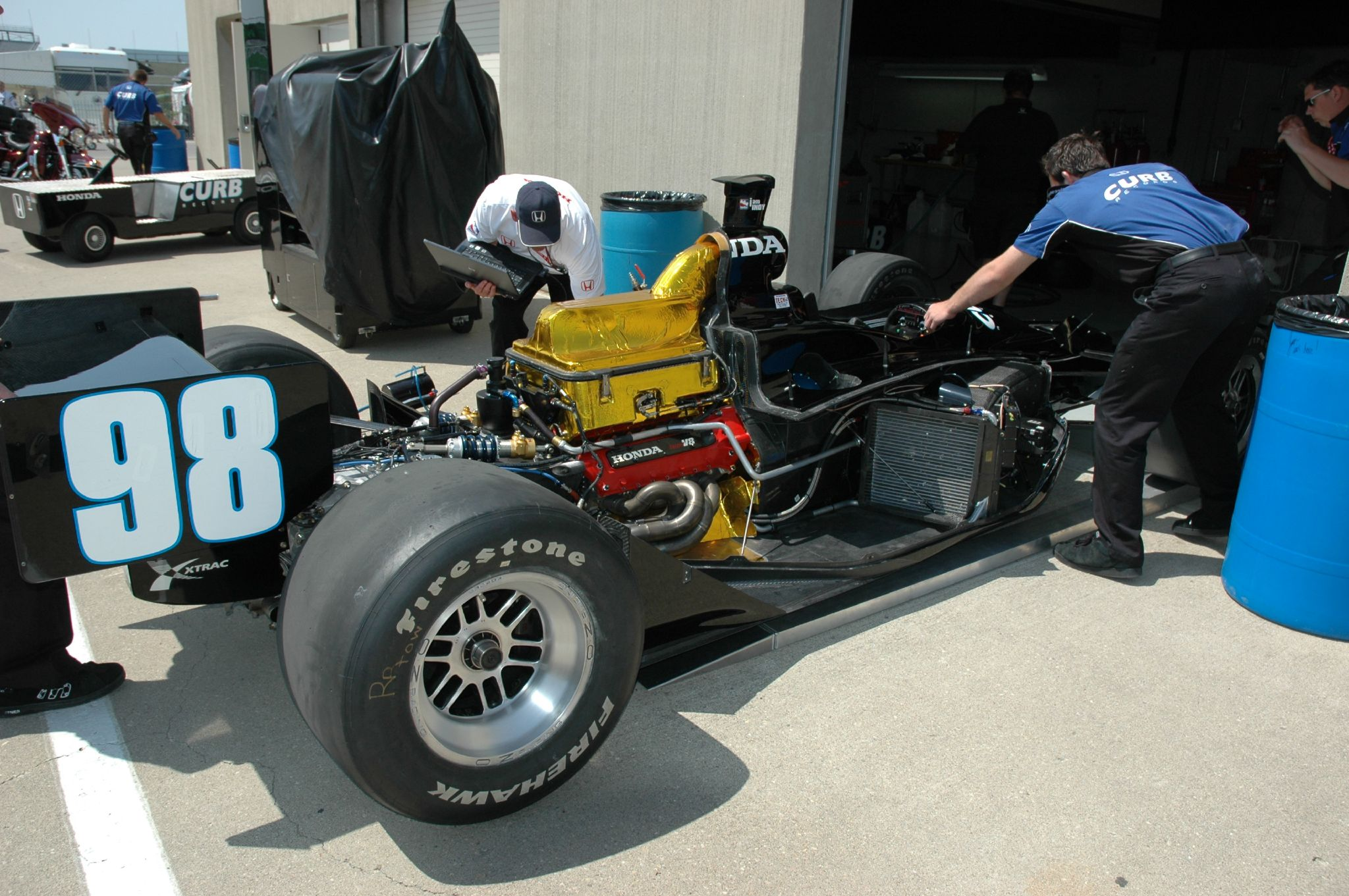
Mechanics working on Barron's car in the garage during a practice session for the 2007 Indianapolis 500

In 2004 and 2005, Barron drove for Eddie Cheever's Red Bull Cheever Racing. Red Bull sponsorship of the team ended for 2006, leaving Alex unable to remain with the team - he instead took a step backward, returning to the Champ Car Atlantic Championship for 2006 with Polestar Racing Group where he finished fourteenth in points. Early that year, he raced twice for alongside Michael McDowell for Playboy/Uniden Racing, with a best finish of sixth in the Rolex 24 At Daytona, the pair aided by Memo Gidley. Greg Beck signed him to run races part-time in the IndyCar Series for the 2007 season for CURB/Agajanian/Beck Motorsports. He competed in three races, including the Indy 500. Barron would return to Daytona for the 2008 Rolex 24, with Southard Motorsport, only to retire from the race. He would not race internationally again.

Barron now runs a kart business.

== Racing record ==
=== Career summary ===
Season	Series	Position	Team	Car
1996	United States Formula Ford 2000 National Championship	8th	DSTP Team	Van Diemen RF96
1997	KOOL Toyota Atlantic Championship	1st	Lynx Racing	Ralt-Toyota RT41
1998	CART FedEx Championship Series	27th	All American Racers	Eagle-Toyota 987; Reynard-Toyota 98i
1999	CART FedEx Championship Series	27th	All American Racers; Marlboro Team Penske	Eagle-Toyota 997; Penske-Mercedes PC27B-99
2000	CART FedEx Championship Series	26th	Dale Coyne Racing	Lola-Ford B2K/00
2001	CART FedEx Championship Series	29th	Arciero-Blair Racing	Lola-Ford B2K/00
2001	Indy Racing Northern Light Series	44th	Sam Schmidt Motorsports	Dallara-Oldsmobile IR1
2002	Indy Racing League	5th	Blair Racing	Dallara-Chevrolet IR2
2003	IndyCar Series	17th	Team Penske; Mo Nunn Racing; Red Bull Cheever Racing	G-Force-Toyota GF09; Dallara-Chevrolet IR2
2004	IndyCar Series	12th	Red Bull Cheever Racing	Dallara-Chevrolet IR2
2005	IndyCar Series	11th	Red Bull Cheever Racing	Dallara-Toyota IR5
2006	Yokohama Presents the Champ Car; Atlantic Championship Powered by Mazda	14th	Polestar Racing	Swift-Toyota 0.16a
2006	Rolex Sports Car Series	78th	Playboy/Uniden Racing	Crawford-Ford DP03
2007	IndyCar Series	22nd	CURB/Agajanian/Beck Motorsports	Dallara-Honda IR4
2008	Rolex Sports Car Series	59th	Southard Motorsports	Riley-Lexus Mk XI
2017	F2000 Championship Series	NC	Polestar	Van Diemen / Zetec
2018	F1600 Championship Series	NC		Van Diemen Ford
2019	Blancpain GT World Challenge America	36th	K2R Motorsport	Porsche 911 GT3 R (2019)
2019	IMSA Prototype Challenge	27th	K2R Motorsport	Ligier JS P3

=== Complete 24 Hours of Daytona results ===
Year	Team	Co-Drivers	Car	Class	Laps	Pos.	Class Pos.
2006	(United States) Playboy/Uniden Racing	(United States) Memo Gidley (United States) Michael McDowell	Crawford-Ford DP03	DP	716	6th	6th
2008	(United States) Southard Motorsport	(United States) Shane Lewis (United States) Bill Lester (United States) Ted Christopher	Riley-Lexus Mk XI	DP	527	DNF	DNF

=== American open wheel racing results ===
(key)

==== CART ====
Year	Team	No.	Chassis	Engine	1	2	3	4	5	6	7	8	9	10	11	12	13	14	15	16	17	18	19	20	21	Rank	Points	Ref
1998	All American Racers	36	Reynard 98i	Toyota RV8C V8t	MIA; 18	MOT; 24	LBH; 14	NZR; DNQ	RIO; 12	STL; 14	MIL; DNQ	DET; 20	POR; 14	CLE; 15	TOR; 28	MIS; 15										27th	2	
1998	All American Racers	36	Eagle 987	Toyota RV8D V8t													MDO; 16	ROA; 24	VAN; 19	LS; 20	HOU; 12	SRF; 19	FON; 13			27th	2	
1999	All American Racers	36	Eagle 997	Toyota RV8D V8t	MIA; 15	MOT; 17	LBH; 23	NZR; 9	RIO; 23	STL; 16	MIL; 14	POR	CLE	ROA	TOR											27th	4	
1999	Team Penske	3	Penske PC-27	Mercedes-Benz IC108E V8t												MIS; 18	DET	MDO	CHI	VAN	LS	HOU	SRF	FON; 24		27th	4	
2000	Dale Coyne Racing	19	Lola B2K/00	Ford XF V8t	MIA	LBH	RIO	MOT	NZR	MIL	DET	POR	CLE	TOR	MIS	CHI	MDO	ROA	VAN; 13	LS; 21	STL; 17	HOU; 12	SRF; 14	FON; 8		26th	6	
2001	Arciero-Blair Racing	25	Lola B2K/00	Ford XF V8t	MTY	LBH	TXS	NZR	MOT	MIL	DET	POR	CLE	TOR	MIS	CHI	MDO	ROA	VAN	LAU	ROC	HOU	LS	SRF; 13	FON; 9	29th	4	

==== IndyCar Series ====
Year	Team	No.	Chassis	Engine	1	2	3	4	5	6	7	8	9	10	11	12	13	14	15	16	17	Rank	Points	Ref
2001	Sam Schmidt Motorsports	99	Dallara IR-01	Oldsmobile Aurora V8	PHX	HMS	ATL	INDY	TXS	PPI	RIR	KAN	NSH	KTY	STL; 21	CHI	TX2					44th	9	
2002	Blair Racing	44	Dallara IR-02	Chevrolet Indy V8	HMS; 8	PHX; 23	FON; 12	NZR; 6	INDY; 4	TXS; 10	PPI; 10	RIR; 10	KAN; 8	NSH; 1	MCH; 12	KTY; 9	STL; 3	CHI; 12	TX2; 5			5th	366	
2003	Penske Racing	6	G-Force GF09	Toyota Indy V8	HMS	PHX	MOT; 17															17th	216	
2003	Mo Nunn Racing	20	G-Force GF09	Toyota Indy V8				INDY; 6	TXS	PPI	RIR	KAN										17th	216	
2003	Mo Nunn Racing	21	G-Force GF09	Toyota Indy V8									NSH; 5	MCH; 1	STL; 16	KTY; 20	NZR; 15					17th	216	
2003	Team Cheever	52	Dallara IR-03	Chevrolet Indy V8														CHI; 7	FON; 10	TX2; 20		17th	216	
2004	Cheever Racing	51	Dallara IR-04	Chevrolet Indy V8	HMS; 16	PHX; 4	MOT; 12	INDY; 12	TXS; 3	RIR; 22	KAN; 10	NSH; 17	MIL; 7	MCH; 11	KTY; 11	PPI; 10	NZR; 12	CHI; 12	FON; 18	TX2; 14		12th	310	
2005	Team Cheever	51	Dallara IR-05	Toyota Indy V8	HMS; 8	PHX; 13	STP; 10	MOT; 19	INDY; 13	TXS; 14	RIR; 6	KAN; 13	NSH; 15	MIL; 8	MCH; 11	KTY; 4	PPI; 18	SNM; 3	CHI; 21	WGL; 17	FON; 14	11th	329	
2007	CURB/Agajanian/Beck Motorsports	98	Dallara IR-05	Honda HI7R V8	HMS; 19	STP	MOT	KAN; 16	INDY; 15	MIL	TXS	IOW	RIR	WGL	NSH	MDO	MCH	KTY	SNM	DET	CHI	22nd	41	

Years	Teams	Races	Poles	Wins	Podiums (non-win)	Top 10s (non-podium)	Indianapolis 500 wins	Championships
6	6	62	0	2	3	22	0	0

==== Indianapolis 500 ====
Year	Chassis	Engine	Start	Finish	Team
2002	Dallara IR-02	Chevrolet Indy V8	26	4	Blair Racing
2003	G-Force GF09	Toyota Indy V8	25	6	Mo Nunn Racing
2004	Dallara IR-04	Chevrolet Indy V8	24	12	Team Cheever
2005	Dallara IR-05	Toyota Indy V8	22	13	Team Cheever
2007	Dallara IR-05	Honda HI7R V8	26	15	CURB/Agajanian/Beck Motorsports

Sporting positions
Preceded by Patrick Carpentier	Toyota Atlantic Champion; 1997	Succeeded by Lee Bentham
Awards and achievements
Preceded by Hélio Castroneves	Indianapolis 500; Rookie of the Year (with Tomas Scheckter); 2002	Succeeded by Toranosuke Takagi
