= Mo Nunn =

British motor racing team owner and engineer

- Born: Morris Nuffield Nunn; 27 September 1938; Walsall, England
- Died: 18 July 2018 (aged 79)
- Occupations: Motor racing, engineer and team owner
- Years active: 1963–2005
- Known for: Formula One, team owner (Ensign); Champ Car and Indy Racing League, team owner (Mo Nunn Racing)

Morris Nuffield Nunn (27 September 1938 – 18 July 2018) was an English motor racing team owner and engineer.

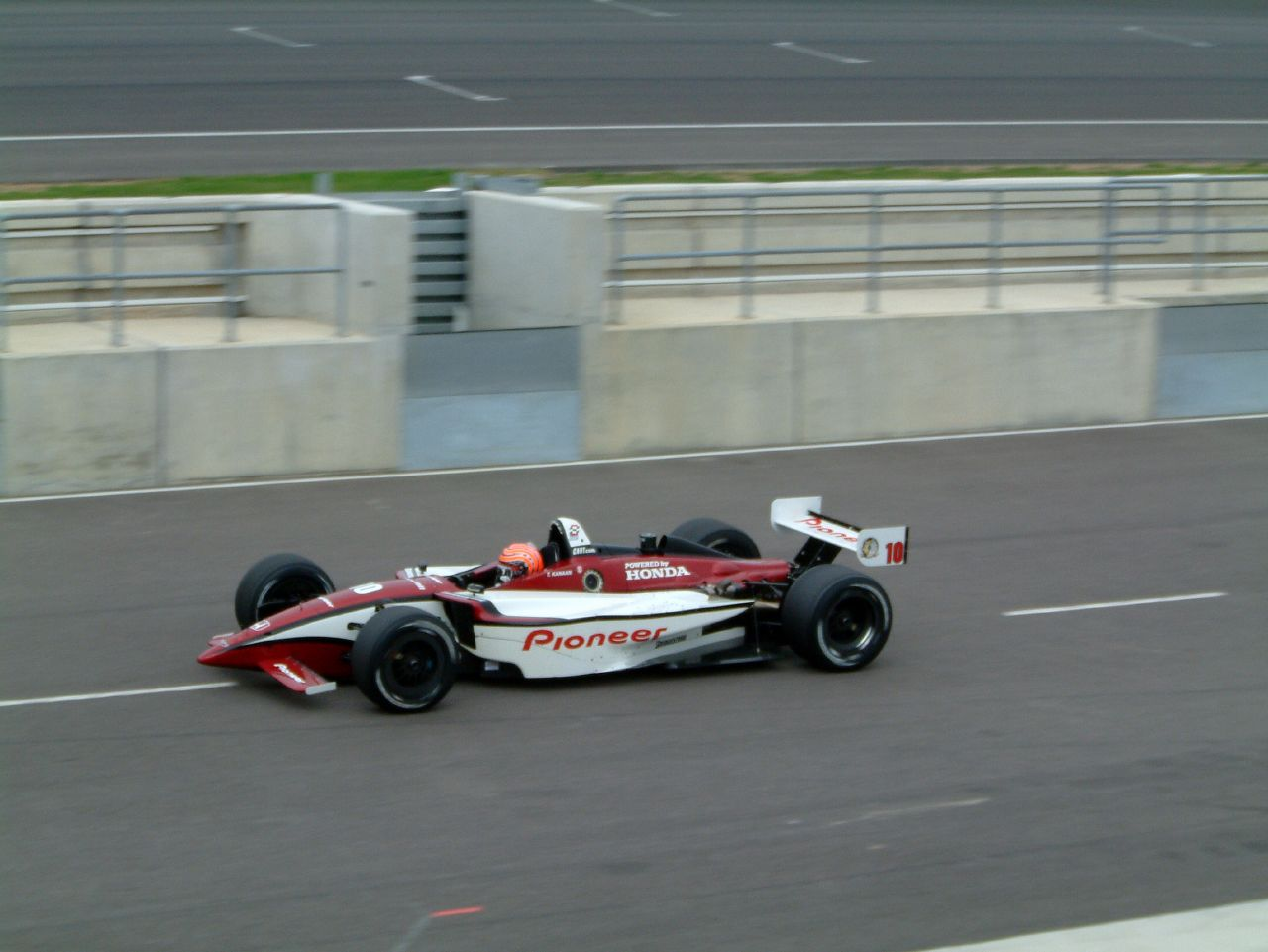
Tony Kanaan driving for Mo Nunn Racing at Rockingham Motor Speedway in 2002

He founded and ran the Ensign Formula One team in the late 1970s and early 1980s, and later worked for Chip Ganassi's highly successful Champ Car team, before founding Mo Nunn Racing for the 2000 season.

At the urging of Mercedes-Benz Nunn again started a team for the 2002 Indy Racing League season. The team was sponsored by WorldCom and Hollywood cigarettes and initially hired Tony Kanaan and Felipe Giaffone. Giaffone finished 3rd in the 2002 Indianapolis 500 and Kanaan was leading but crashed in the last laps. A third car driven by Jeff Simmons finished ninth.

In 2002, Nunn entered one car each in Champ Car and the rival Indy Racing League. The IRL entry for Giaffone proved more competitive than Kanaan's Champ Car entry, encouraging the team to concentrate purely on IRL a year later. With Toyota and Pioneer backing, the former F1 driver Tora Takagi joined the team. He finished 10th in 2003, while Giaffone missed races because of injuries. He was replaced by Alex Barron, who won the Michigan race. For 2004, only one car was entered, for Takagi, whose performance was not impressive after a heavy crash at Twin Ring Motegi. Other than a joint effort with Fernández Racing at the 2005 Indianapolis 500, Nunn closed the team in 2005 and retired.

== Race results ==
=== Complete CART FedEx Championship Series results ===
(key) (results in bold indicate pole position; results in italics indicate fastest lap; results with * indicate most laps led)

Year	Chassis	Engine	Drivers	No.	1	2	3	4	5	6	7	8	9	10	11	12	13	14	15	16	17	18	19	20	21	Pts Pos	Pos
2000					MIA	LBH	RIO	MOT	NAZ	MIL	DET	POR	CLE	TOR	MCH	CHI	MDO	ROA	VAN	LAG	GAT	HOU	SRF	FON			
2000	Reynard 2Ki	Mercedes IC 108E																									
2000	Reynard 2Ki	Mercedes IC 108E	(Brazil) Tony Kanaan	55	10	16	18	16	8	10	DNS				24	16	13	8	14	22	13	10	8	18		19th	24
2000	Reynard 2Ki	Mercedes IC 108E	(United States) Bryan Herta	55								16	9	18												18th	26
2001					MTY	LBH	TEX	NAZ	MOT	MIL	DET	POR	CLE	TOR	MCH	CHI	MDO	ROA	VAN	LAU	ROC	HOU	LAG	SRF	FON		
2001	Reynard 01i	Honda HR-1	(Brazil) Tony Kanaan	55	7	7	C^{1}	16	3	6	DNS	24	16	10	21	**8**	5	12	4	7	8	12	8	17	5	9th	93
2001	Reynard 01i	Honda HR-1	(Italy) Alex Zanardi	66	24	26	C^{1}	20	7	11	24	26	13	4	20	9	19	13	24	20						23rd	24
2001	Reynard 01i	Honda HR-1	(United States) Casey Mears **(R)**	66																		17	11	26	8	28th	7
2002					MTY	LBH	MOT	MIL	LAG	POR	CHI	TOR	CLE	VAN	MDO	ROA	MTL	DEN	ROC	MIA	SFR	FON	MXC				
2002	Reynard 02i	Honda HR-2	(Brazil) Tony Kanaan	10	16	20	15*																			12th	99
2002	Lola B2/00	Honda HR-2	(Brazil) Tony Kanaan	10				16	12	8	8	17	8	3	14	4	3	6	15	**9**	5	**4**	8*			12th	99

1. The Firestone Firehawk 600 was canceled after qualifying due to excessive g-forces on the drivers.

=== IndyCar Series results ===
(key)

Year	Chassis	Engine	Drivers	No.	1	2	3	4	5	6	7	8	9	10	11	12	13	14	15	16	Pts Pos	Pos
2002					HMS	PHX	FON	NAZ	INDY	TXS	PPIR	RIR	KAN	NSH	MCH	KTY	GAT	CHI	TXS			
2002	G-Force GF05C	Chevrolet Indy V8	(Brazil) Tony Kanaan	17					28												50th	**2**
2002	G-Force GF05C	Chevrolet Indy V8	(Brazil) Felipe Giaffone	21	7	19	6	2	3	5	4	3	4	7	3	1*	21	6	17		4th	**432**
2003					HMS	PHX	MOT	INDY	TXS	PPIR	RIR	KAN	NSH	MCH	GAT	KTY	NAZ	CHI	FON	TXS		
2003	G-Force GF09; Dallara IR-03	Toyota Indy V8	(Japan) Toranosuke Takagi	12	12	22	8	5	3^{1}	6	13	18	7	6	7	18	14	9	18	7	10th	**317**
2003	G-Force GF09; Dallara IR-03	Toyota Indy V8	(Netherlands) Arie Luyendyk	20				DNQ													NC	—
2003	G-Force GF09; Dallara IR-03	Toyota Indy V8	(United States) Alex Barron	20				6													17th	**216**
2003	G-Force GF09; Dallara IR-03	Toyota Indy V8	(United States) Alex Barron	21									5	1	16	20	15				17th	**216**
2003	G-Force GF09; Dallara IR-03	Toyota Indy V8	(Brazil) Felipe Giaffone	21	9	3	3	33	17	13	6	22						15	16	19	20th	**199**
2004					HMS	PHX	MOT	INDY	TXS	RIR	KAN	NSH	MIL	MCH	KTY	PPIR	NAZ	CHI	FON	TXS		
2004	Dallara IR-04	Toyota Indy V8	(Japan) Toranosuke Takagi	12	4	8	10	19	10	19	21	11	20	20	20	19	17	13	14	12	15th	**263**
2004	Dallara IR-04	Toyota Indy V8	(United States) Jeff Simmons **(R)**	21				16													29th	**26**

1. Toranosuke Takagi had a 23 points deduction at Texas Motor Speedway due to unacceptable driving.
