= 310 Motoring =

310 Motoring was an automotive customization garage based in Los Angeles, California, United States, founded by Marc Laidler in 1999. The name is based on area code 310 for its original location in Los Angeles. The company grew and now has shops across the United States, including 45 in the state of California. In 2006 the company ventured into the footwear industry, premiering their debut shoe, Hurricanes, which is sponsored by rapper The Game.

The company also sold shoes under the 310 Motoring Footwear brand. 310 Motoring sponsored the "Game's Big Game", a 2007 NCAA tournament pool, hosted on Facebook, where individuals competed to win a trip for two to the 2007 NCAA championship game.

In 2002, 310 Racing was founded, and participated in the Indy Racing League IndyCar Series and 2002 Indianapolis 500 with driver George Mack. It was the first minority-owned IndyCar team. The team raced for one season with Mack finishing 16th in points with a best race finish of 13th.

The company ceased operation sometime prior to 2008.
