= 2015 GoPro Grand Prix of Sonoma =

16th round of the 2015 IndyCar Series

Coordinates: 38°09′39″N 122°27′18″W

(United States) 2015 GoPro Grand Prix of Sonoma
Race details
16th round of the 2015 IndyCar season
← Previous race	Next race →
- Layout of the Sonoma Raceway
- Date: August 30, 2015
- Official name: GoPro Grand Prix of Sonoma
- Location: Sonoma Raceway, Sonoma, California
- Course: Permanent road course 2.385 mi / 3.838 km
- Distance: 85 laps 202.725 mi / 326.230 km

Pole position
- Driver: (Australia) Will Power (Team Penske)
- Time: 01:16.2597

Fastest lap
- Driver: (Brazil) Hélio Castroneves (Team Penske)
- Time: 01:19.4914 (on lap 5 of 85)

Podium
- First: (New Zealand) Scott Dixon (Chip Ganassi Racing)
- Second: (United States) Ryan Hunter-Reay (Andretti Autosport)
- Third: (United States) Charlie Kimball (Chip Ganassi Racing)

Chronology
Previous	Next
2014	2016

The 2015 GoPro Grand Prix of Sonoma was an IndyCar motor race held on August 30, 2015, at the Sonoma Raceway in Sonoma, California. It was the 16th and final round of the 2015 IndyCar season and the 11th annual edition of the event. Contested over 85 laps, the race was won by Chip Ganassi Racing driver Scott Dixon. Ryan Hunter-Reay of Andretti Autosport finished second and Charlie Kimball, Dixon's teammate, finished third.

Will Power, who was fastest in two of the three pre-race practice sessions and won the pole position, was the dominant factor of the early portion of the race, leading 26 of the first 34 laps. However, Power was taken out of contention after he was hit by his Team Penske teammate, Juan Pablo Montoya, shortly before the halfway point of the race. Chip Ganassi Racing teammates Sebastián Saavedra and Tony Kanaan stayed out for multiple laps and traded the lead, but after they both pitted, Dixon maintained as much fuel as he could and scored the win. There were two caution flags for fourteen laps, and ten lead changes amongst seven drivers.

With his win, Dixon earned his fourth IndyCar Drivers' Championship on account of a tiebreaker with Montoya, who finished sixth. Following a late-race spin, Graham Rahal fell from second to fourth in points. Power recovered to finish seventh in the race, and overtook third in championship standings. Hélio Castroneves, who set the fastest lap of the race, maintained fifth. Chevrolet had also won the Manufacturers' Championship over Honda.

== Background ==
The GoPro Grand Prix of Sonoma was first announced alongside the rest of IndyCar's 2015 schedule in October 2014. It was the eleventh consecutive year the IndyCar Series had raced at the track, the first time that the track hosted the series' championship-deciding race, and the first time since the 2007 Champ Car World Series that an Indy car season finale was held on a road course.

This was the first IndyCar race held after the death of Justin Wilson, which occurred during the ABC Supply 500 the weekend prior. Despite the heavy mood surrounding the sport, IndyCar officials decided to contest the race and the Championship Celebration in San Francisco as scheduled. To honor Wilson, Andretti Autosport announced on August 27 that Oriol Servià would drive the team's #25 Honda entry, which was primarily driven by Wilson before his death. This race also marked the return of Mikhail Aleshin, who drove Schmidt Peterson Motorsports' one-off #77 Honda entry. Aleshin had spent the entire 2015 season recovering from several injuries that he suffered from a major crash during practice for the 2014 MAVTV 500. He also tested the car on August 20 as a warmup.

=== Championship standings before the race ===
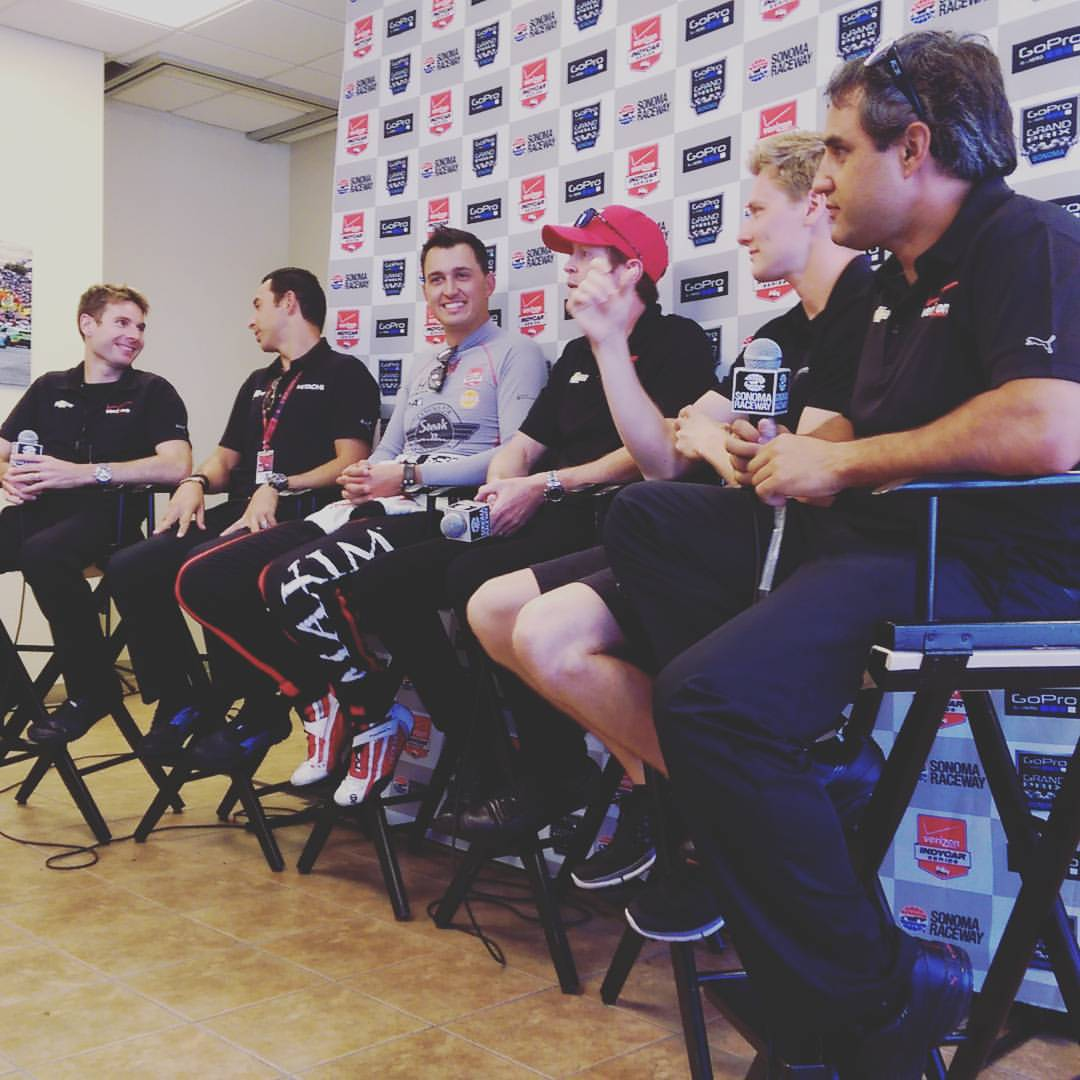
The top six drivers in points heading into the race (pictured left to right: Will Power, Hélio Castroneves, Graham Rahal, Scott Dixon, Josef Newgarden, and Juan Pablo Montoya).

Following the ABC Supply 500, Juan Pablo Montoya had earned 500 points. He extended his Drivers' Championship points lead from 9 points to 34 points over Graham Rahal, who crashed and finished twentieth. Scott Dixon maintained third, 47 points back. Will Power, the defending IndyCar champion and three-time winner of the event, was in fourth, 61 points behind. Hélio Castroneves rounded out the top five in points, 77 points behind. Meanwhile, Chevrolet was leading the Manufacturers' Championship with 1429 points; Honda trailed in second with 1083 points.

Montoya was on pace to earning his second overall Indy car championship, following his 1999 CART title. However, IndyCar made a rule change for the 2015 season and beyond, which awarded drivers double points in the Indianapolis 500 and the season finale. This meant the maximum amount of points that could be earned in this race was 104 (100 points for 1st place, 1 point for winning the pole, 1 point for leading a lap, and 2 points for leading the most laps). Thus, the top six drivers in points (Montoya, Rahal, Dixon, Power, Castroneves, and Josef Newgarden, who was 87 points behind Montoya) were all mathematically eligible to win the championship. The 2015 season was the tenth consecutive season of IndyCar in which the championship was decided in the final round.

=== Entry list ===
25 cars and drivers were entered for the GoPro Grand Prix of Sonoma. All entries used the spec Dallara DW12 chassis, manufacturer aero kits, and Firestone tires. Of the 25 drivers, six of them had previously won at Sonoma: Tony Kanaan (2005), Marco Andretti (2006), Scott Dixon (2007, 2014), Hélio Castroneves (2008), Will Power (2010, 2011, 2013), and Ryan Briscoe (2012).

Key	Meaning
R	Rookie
W	Past winner

No.	Driver	Team	Engine
1	(Australia) Will Power W	Team Penske	Chevrolet
2	(Colombia) Juan Pablo Montoya	Team Penske	Chevrolet
3	(Brazil) Hélio Castroneves W	Team Penske	Chevrolet
4	(Monaco) Stefano Coletti R	KV Racing Technology	Chevrolet
5	(Australia) Ryan Briscoe W	Schmidt Peterson Motorsports	Honda
7	(United Kingdom) James Jakes	Schmidt Peterson Motorsports	Honda
8	(Colombia) Sebastián Saavedra	Chip Ganassi Racing	Chevrolet
9	(New Zealand) Scott Dixon W	Chip Ganassi Racing	Chevrolet
10	(Brazil) Tony Kanaan W	Chip Ganassi Racing	Chevrolet
11	(France) Sébastien Bourdais	KVSH Racing	Chevrolet
14	(Japan) Takuma Sato	A. J. Foyt Racing	Honda
15	(United States) Graham Rahal	Rahal Letterman Lanigan Racing	Honda
18	(Venezuela) Rodolfo González R	Dale Coyne Racing	Honda
19	(France) Tristan Vautier	Dale Coyne Racing	Honda
20	(Italy) Luca Filippi	CFH Racing	Chevrolet
22	(France) Simon Pagenaud	Team Penske	Chevrolet
25	(Spain) Oriol Servià	Andretti Autosport	Honda
26	(Colombia) Carlos Muñoz	Andretti Autosport	Honda
27	(United States) Marco Andretti W	Andretti Autosport	Honda
28	(United States) Ryan Hunter-Reay	Andretti Autosport	Honda
41	(United Kingdom) Jack Hawksworth	A. J. Foyt Racing	Honda
67	(United States) Josef Newgarden	CFH Racing	Chevrolet
77	(Russia) Mikhail Aleshin	Schmidt Peterson Motorsports	Honda
83	(United States) Charlie Kimball	Chip Ganassi Racing	Chevrolet
98	(Colombia) Gabby Chaves R	Bryan Herta Autosport	Honda

== Practice and qualifying ==
Two practice sessions preceded the race on Sunday, August 30. The first, a 210-minute session, was held at 2:30 PM PDT on Friday, August 28, while the second, a 45-minute session, was held at 10:45 AM PDT on Saturday, August 29, a few hours prior to qualifying.

Will Power, one of the favorites to win the race, set the fastest lap in the first practice session on Friday afternoon with a time of 1 minute and 17.4858 seconds. Graham Rahal and Ryan Hunter-Reay trailed him in second and third, respectively. After the session, Power commented on Firestone's primary tires, noting its ability to degrade in a long run and predicting that the tires will "create good racing". Tristan Vautier was forced to miss the first two hours of the session because of his crash with Graham Rahal in the ABC Supply 500, which IndyCar officials deemed avoidable contact. Hunter-Reay led the second practice session on Saturday morning with a time of 1 minute and 16.8702 seconds, with championship contenders Rahal and Josef Newgarden setting the second and third fastest laps. Ten drivers in the session broke Power's track record that he set in qualifying in 2014.

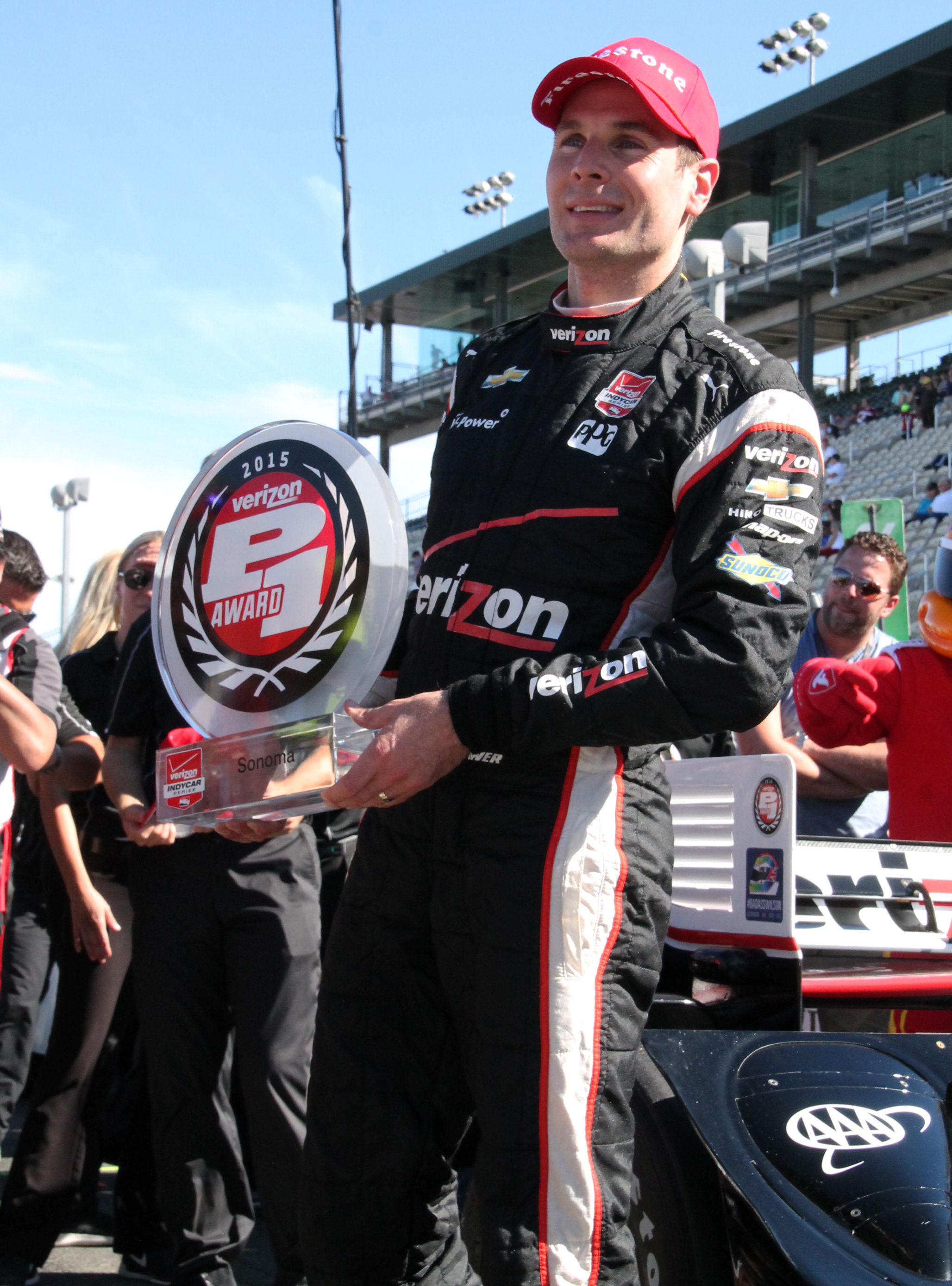
Will Power won the pole for the race and was fastest in two pre-race practice sessions.

Qualifying was held at 3:05 PM PDT on Saturday, August 29, and took place over three rounds. The drivers were split into two groups in the first round, and the top six fastest drivers from each group advance to the next round. Simon Pagenaud was fastest in the first group. He and Rahal, Tony Kanaan, Marco Andretti, Charlie Kimball, and Juan Pablo Montoya advanced to the next round. Power was fastest in the second group and the fastest overall driver in the first round. He and Newgarden, Scott Dixon, Hunter-Reay, Sebastián Saavedra, and Carlos Muñoz advanced to the next round. In the second round, Power set the fastest lap again, advancing him to the final round along with Hunter-Reay, Pagenaud, Newgarden, Rahal, and Montoya. The final round, the "Firestone Fast Six", saw Power set the fastest lap yet again, winning him the pole for the sixth time in 2015, a feat that had not been done since Scott Dixon in 2008. Power's lap of 1 minute and 16.2597 seconds also broke his own track record that he set the year prior. The top two drivers in points, Montoya and Rahal, qualified alongside each other in 5th and 6th.

=== Qualifying classification ===
Pos	No.	Driver	Team	Engine	Time				Final grid
Pos	No.	Driver	Team	Engine	Round 1		Round 2	Round 3	Final grid
Pos	No.	Driver	Team	Engine	Group 1	Group 2	Round 2	Round 3	Final grid
1	1	(Australia) Will Power W	Team Penske	Chevrolet	—N/a	**1:16.5702**	**1:16.5571**	**1:16.2597**	1
2	67	(United States) Josef Newgarden	CFH Racing	Chevrolet	—N/a	1:16.5982	1:16.6215	1:16.3964	2
3	28	(United States) Ryan Hunter-Reay	Andretti Autosport	Honda	—N/a	1:16.9712	1:16.5620	1:16.5254	3
4	22	(France) Simon Pagenaud	Team Penske	Chevrolet	**1:16.8419**	—N/a	1:16.5859	1:16.6683	4
5	2	(Colombia) Juan Pablo Montoya	Team Penske	Chevrolet	1:17.0588	—N/a	1:16.6631	1:16.8437	5
6	15	(United States) Graham Rahal	Rahal Letterman Lanigan Racing	Honda	1:16.8616	—N/a	1:16.6435	1:17.1769	6
7	83	(United States) Charlie Kimball	Chip Ganassi Racing	Chevrolet	1:16.9622	—N/a	1:16.6669	—N/a	7
8	27	(United States) Marco Andretti W	Andretti Autosport	Honda	1:16.9153	—N/a	1:16.8710	—N/a	8
9	9	(New Zealand) Scott Dixon W	Chip Ganassi Racing	Chevrolet	—N/a	1:16.7365	1:16.9677	—N/a	9
10	8	(Colombia) Sebastián Saavedra	Chip Ganassi Racing	Chevrolet	—N/a	1:17.2631	1:17.1596	—N/a	10
11	10	(Brazil) Tony Kanaan W	Chip Ganassi Racing	Chevrolet	1:16.8719	—N/a	1:17.2899	—N/a	11
12	26	(Colombia) Carlos Muñoz	Andretti Autosport	Honda	—N/a	1:17.3713	1:17.3302	—N/a	12
13	20	(Italy) Luca Filippi	CFH Racing	Chevrolet	1:17.1077	—N/a	—N/a	—N/a	13
14	77	(Russia) Mikhail Aleshin	Schmidt Peterson Motorsports	Honda	—N/a	1:17.3885	—N/a	—N/a	14
15	3	(Brazil) Hélio Castroneves W	Team Penske	Chevrolet	1:17.2550	—N/a	—N/a	—N/a	15
16	11	(France) Sébastien Bourdais	KVSH Racing	Chevrolet	—N/a	1:17.4310	—N/a	—N/a	16
17	5	(Australia) Ryan Briscoe W	Schmidt Peterson Motorsports	Honda	1:17.4886	—N/a	—N/a	—N/a	17
18	14	(Japan) Takuma Sato	A. J. Foyt Racing	Honda	—N/a	1:17.5599	—N/a	—N/a	18
19	25	(Spain) Oriol Servià	Andretti Autosport	Honda	1:17.5724	—N/a	—N/a	—N/a	19
20	4	(Monaco) Stefano Coletti R	KV Racing Technology	Chevrolet	—N/a	1:17.8293	—N/a	—N/a	20
21	98	(Colombia) Gabby Chaves R	Bryan Herta Autosport	Honda	1:17.7994	—N/a	—N/a	—N/a	21
22	7	(United Kingdom) James Jakes	Schmidt Peterson Motorsports	Honda	—N/a	1:17.8968	—N/a	—N/a	22
23	19	(France) Tristan Vautier	Dale Coyne Racing	Honda	1:17.9876	—N/a	—N/a	—N/a	23
24	18	(Venezuela) Rodolfo González R	Dale Coyne Racing	Honda	—N/a	1:18.3867	—N/a	—N/a	24
25	41	(United Kingdom) Jack Hawksworth	A. J. Foyt Racing	Honda	—N/a	1:19.0408	—N/a	—N/a	25
Qualifying results

Notes

- **Bold text** indicates fastest time set in session.

== Warm-up ==
All 25 drivers took to the track at 10:00 AM PDT for a thirty-minute warm-up session on Sunday, August 30, only a few hours prior to the race. Will Power again topped the speed charts during the session with a time of 1 minute and 17.8107 seconds. Takuma Sato and Simon Pagenaud were second and third-quickest in the session respectively.

== Race ==
The race began at 2:07 PM PDT on Sunday, August 30. Prior to the race, Justin Wilson was honored with a tribute video, a moment of silence, and a playing of "God Save the Queen", the national anthem of Great Britain, where Wilson was born. Despite the somber mood, the skies were sunny, and the race began with a rolling start. Unlike the 2014 Sonoma race, this race got going without any incidents. Pole sitter Will Power immediately ran off with the race lead as the cars bunched up behind him. Rahal came close to spinning around in turn four as Marco Andretti hit him from behind. On lap 3, Hélio Castroneves was forced to pit early for nose damage and new tires, and several other drivers towards the rear of the field, such as Sébastien Bourdais, Tristan Vautier, Jack Hawksworth, and James Jakes, would follow not long after. With not much to lose, these drivers pitted early in hopes for a caution so that they may have a strategic advantage, though their strategy failed as the race remained green.

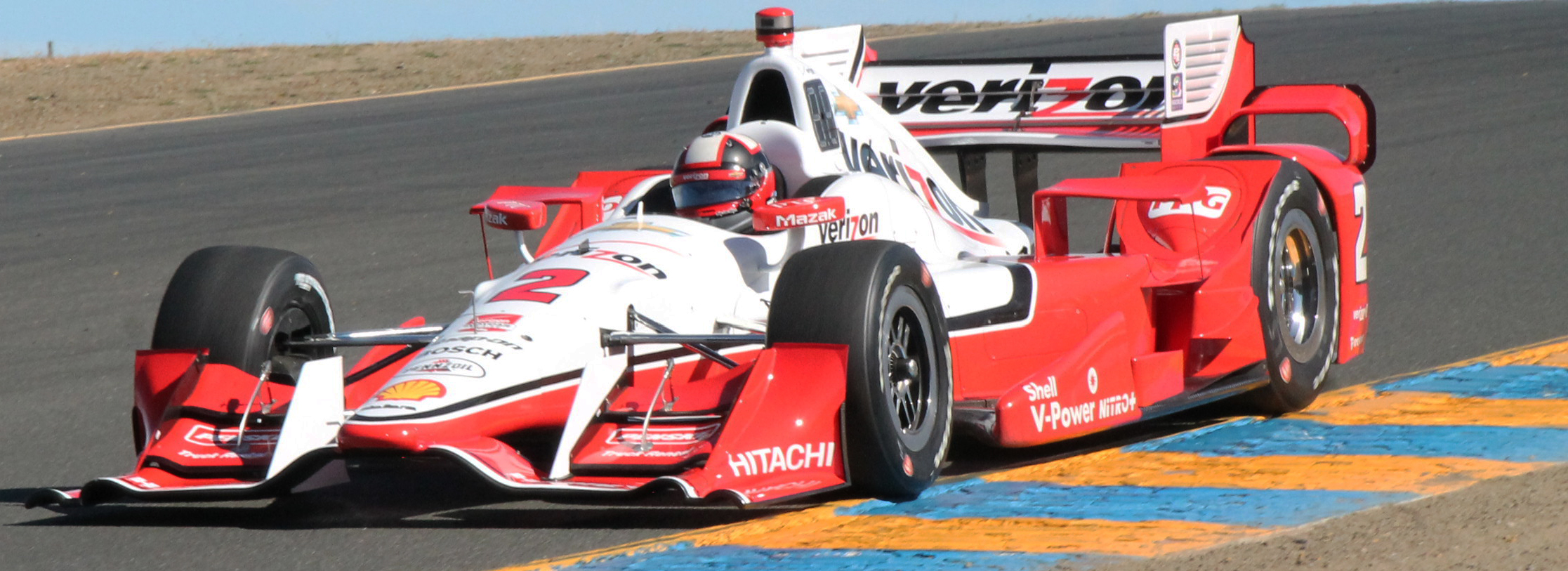
Juan Pablo Montoya (pictured above) lost the championship after leading the points all season.

On lap 14, Power finally gave up the lead as he and Josef Newgarden would pit. However, as Newgarden exited his pit stall, Simon Pagenaud attempted to enter his pit stall, and the two drivers nearly collided. Two laps later, points leader Juan Pablo Montoya would pit along with Ryan Hunter-Reay. After Marco Andretti and Sebastián Saavedra battled for the race lead, both drivers would finally pit on lap 22 along with Andretti's teammate Oriol Servià, giving the lead back to Power. Montoya, who was running 5th, held on to the hypothetical points lead by 17 points over Power. As the drivers who pitted earliest came down for a second round of pit stops, the first caution of the race was finally flown on lap 33 for Luca Filippi, who slowed on track due to terminal issues. Several of the race leaders drove into pit road for tires and fuel and lost their positions, while the drivers who had pitted right before the caution were shifted to the lead. Scott Dixon exited pit road first, gaining two positions. Saavedra, one of the drivers who stayed out, assumed control of the field once again.

When the race was restarted on lap 39, Will Power, who had led the most laps in the race up to that point, was spun from behind by teammate Juan Pablo Montoya in turn 4, damaging Montoya's front wing. The caution was brought out for the second time, and both drivers would pit to repair damage, losing many positions in the process. By this point, Rahal climbed back to second in the championship standings, only 10 points behind Montoya, whose 2015 championship was now in jeopardy. On lap 45, Saavedra would give up the lead to teammate Tony Kanaan, who had better tires. Four laps later, Saavedra, Andretti, and several others would pit again, beginning the third round of green-flag pit stops. Rahal and Dixon, who were now both within 10 points of the championship lead, were running inside the top ten, while Montoya was still buried in 17th. On lap 50, Bourdais and Pagenaud, who were running in 2nd and 3rd respectively, would pit, which gave the hypothetical championship lead to Dixon for the first time in the 2015 season. As the pit stop rotation was occurring, Montoya fell back to third in points, though he would shortly regain second over Rahal.

With less than thirty laps to go, Dixon continued pulling away from the field as he simultaneously saved fuel, while his Chip Ganassi Racing teammate Tony Kanaan would fend off Montoya in an attempt to prevent him from gaining any further points on Dixon. Meanwhile, Graham Rahal was struggling to gain grip on his car, as he complained about the rear of his car. On lap 62, Josef Newgarden, who was now out of championship contention, pitted from 2nd place. However, as he exited his pit stall, his car stalled and his fuel cell caught on fire, which was quickly extinguished. Newgarden and his team struggled to get the car refired, and he would eventually lose a lap as race leader Scott Dixon finally came into pit road for four tires and fuel.

On lap 65, as Dixon cycled back to the race lead, James Jakes crashed hard into the tire barriers in turn 9, which caused the third caution of the event. Jakes walked out unhurt and became the first retiree of the race. Under the caution, Dixon held onto the hypothetical points lead by 18 points over Montoya and 36 points over the struggling Rahal. When the race restarted again on lap 70, Jack Hawksworth would make contact with Carlos Muñoz in turn 7, causing Muñoz to spin and get stuck on the curbing. The fourth and final caution was finally thrown a lap later as the leaders began approaching turn 7, where a safety truck was attempting to get Muñoz unstuck. Hawksworth would later serve a drive-through penalty for avoidable contact. As things stood, Montoya was inching even closer to points leader Dixon, as their gap had been reduced to a measly six points. However, if Dixon were to win the race, Montoya would have to finish fifth or better to win the championship; at the time, Montoya was running in 8th.

The race was restarted once more on lap 73, and Dixon quickly drove away from the field. As the laps wound down, Montoya was unable to pass anyone and was at risk of losing the championship. Fortunately for Montoya, with nine laps to go, Sébastien Bourdais would make contact with Graham Rahal in turn 7, which sent Rahal around from 6th place and ended any hope he had for winning his first IndyCar championship. Montoya benefitted from Rahal's spin and improved to 7th, which trimmed Dixon's points lead down to just two points over Montoya. However, with seven laps to go, Dixon's points lead doubled to four points over Montoya, as he had gained two bonus points for leading the most laps of the race, once again putting Montoya's hopes at winning the title in peril. A lap later, Bourdais was penalized by IndyCar officials for avoidable contact and forced to make a drive-through stop on pit road, which meant that Montoya would improve to 6th and tie with Scott Dixon for the championship lead. However, Montoya still needed two more points to ensure his championship.

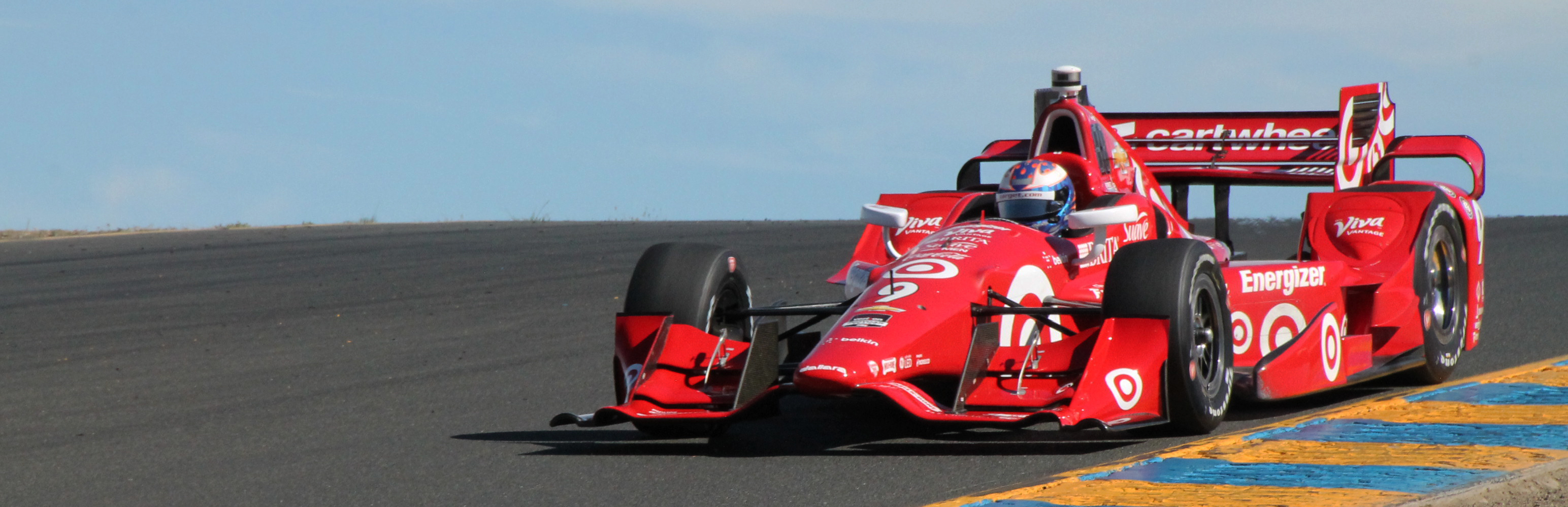
Scott Dixon (pictured above) won the championship in a tiebreaker with Juan Pablo Montoya.

In the remaining five laps of the race, Montoya chased down Ryan Briscoe, who was running in 5th, in order to pass him and secure the championship. With each corner, Montoya cut down several tenths of a second on Briscoe, and by the final lap, Montoya was about half a second behind Briscoe. As Scott Dixon cruised to the victory, Montoya continued his pursuit of Briscoe and the championship. However, it was to no avail, as Montoya finished 6th, 1.18 seconds behind Briscoe.

The win was Dixon's third of the season and the 38th win of his Indy car career, which was only one win behind Al Unser for the fourth-most American open-wheel wins of all time. It also marked Chip Ganassi Racing's 100th victory in Indy car racing. Hunter-Reay finished second, and Charlie Kimball rounded out the podium in third. Kanaan and Briscoe rounded out the top five, and Montoya, Power, Takuma Sato, Rodolfo González, and Mikhail Aleshin rounded out the top ten. Andretti, Servià, Saavedra, Gabby Chaves, Castroneves, Pagenaud, Stefano Coletti, Rahal, Hawksworth, Bourdais, Newgarden, Muñoz, Vautier, and Filippi were the remaining drivers to finish the race. Jakes was the lone retiree.

=== Post-race ===
At season's end, Dixon and Montoya had both earned a cumulative total of 556 points. Because of this, the championship was decided on a countback of race wins in the 2015 season. Dixon earned three wins in 2015 (Long Beach, Texas, and Sonoma), while Montoya only earned two wins (St. Petersburg and Indianapolis 500). Thus, the Drivers' Championship was awarded to Dixon, marking his fourth career IndyCar championship. It tied him with Mario Andretti, Bourdais, and Dario Franchitti for the second-most American open-wheel championships of all time, only trailing seven-time champion A. J. Foyt. Ironically, this wasn't the first time Montoya ended the season in a tie for the championship; the 1999 CART title was also decided by a tiebreaker between Montoya and Franchitti, though Montoya ended up having the upper hand. Had Montoya won the title, he would've become the first driver since Johnny Rutherford in 1980 to lead the points standings in every race of an Indy car season.

“I’m fortunate to drive in the Verizon IndyCar Series and with this team for 14 years. With the depth of the competition, winning a championship in IndyCar is challenging and gratifying. It’s all the small pieces that you have to get out of the car, and this year especially with the introduction of the aero kits. As a team, I think we really do a good job. I couldn’t be prouder of the whole team’s efforts.”

— Scott Dixon on winning his fourth IndyCar championship.

In victory lane, Dixon showed confidence in he and his team's ability to win the title: "This is what we came here for this year. This weekend was a long shot, but we knew we had a shot at it." Dixon also paid tribute to the late Justin Wilson, whose family he comforted in Pennsylvania on the day of his death: "We all raced with heavy hearts this weekend. It's been a very tough week. It's such a small community. But Justin would have wanted us to go out and race, and today I gave it my all from when the green flag dropped. Much love to the Wilson family." Dixon's team owner Chip Ganassi admitted his shock for Dixon's victory, "I'm shocked. We knew we had a car to be at the front, and then a lot of other things had to happen. And they happened."

In contrast, Montoya was frustrated with the way he lost the championship, citing the double-points as the main reason: "It doesn't matter what happened. We had a few ways to win the championship and we just threw it away. We didn't close it." He then threw shade at Dixon's season performance: "Dixon had a shit season all year and had one good race, and we paid the penalty." Montoya's team owner Roger Penske reflected on his team's race and congratulated Ganassi, saying: "Dixon ran a good race and it's unfortunate our guys got together. We had a great year and won the Indy 500, so we're going to move on. That's the sport it is -- when you have double points at the end, that's what happens. We know what a good team Ganassi is and I take my hat off to them for all that they've done."

As for the other championship contenders, Graham Rahal was relegated to 18th in the race and fourth in the championship standings, 66 points behind Dixon, due to his late spin. It was the second consecutive race in which Rahal was taken out by another driver. After the race, he confronted Bourdais for his rough driving. On a positive note, it still marked Rahal's career-best finish in points, a stat that still holds up to this day. Will Power, who led the second-most laps of the race, was a non-factor after his spin, though he recovered to finish 7th. He improved his position in the points standings to third due to Rahal's spin. Hélio Castroneves quietly ran mid-pack throughout the entire race, finishing 15th and maintaining the fifth position in the points standings. Josef Newgarden finished 21st, one lap behind race winner Dixon, in what was a disappointing end to an otherwise promising day. Newgarden fell to seventh in the standings, five points behind the race's runner-up finisher, Ryan Hunter-Reay. Chevrolet was also awarded the Manufacturers' Championship, having accumulated 1645 points throughout the season. Honda was second in manufacturers' points, 466 points behind Chevrolet.

=== Race classification ===
Pos	No.	Driver	Team	Engine	Laps	Time/Retired	Pit Stops	Grid	Laps Led	Pts.^{1}
1	9	(New Zealand) Scott Dixon W	Chip Ganassi Racing	Chevrolet	85	02:09:14.2620	3	9	34	103
2	28	(United States) Ryan Hunter-Reay	Andretti Autosport	Honda	85	+6.1115	3	3	2	81
3	83	(United States) Charlie Kimball	Chip Ganassi Racing	Chevrolet	85	+7.1279	3	7	1	71
4	10	(Brazil) Tony Kanaan W	Chip Ganassi Racing	Chevrolet	85	+8.9030	4	11	6	65
5	5	(Australia) Ryan Briscoe	Schmidt Peterson Motorsports	Honda	85	+10.0749	3	17	0	60
6	2	(Colombia) Juan Pablo Montoya	Team Penske	Chevrolet	85	+11.2548	5	5	0	56
7	1	(Australia) Will Power W	Team Penske	Chevrolet	85	+12.4877	5	1	26	54
8	14	(Japan) Takuma Sato	A. J. Foyt Racing	Honda	85	+16.0888	4	18	0	48
9	18	(Venezuela) Rodolfo González R	Dale Coyne Racing	Honda	85	+20.8011	3	24	0	44
10	77	(Russia) Mikhail Aleshin	Schmidt Peterson Motorsports	Honda	85	+22.5749	4	14	0	40
11	27	(United States) Marco Andretti W	Andretti Autosport	Honda	85	+23.6709	3	8	4	39
12	25	(Spain) Oriol Servià	Andretti Autosport	Honda	85	+24.4514	3	19	0	36
13	8	(Colombia) Sebastián Saavedra	Chip Ganassi Racing	Chevrolet	85	+24.7775	3	10	12	35
14	98	(Colombia) Gabby Chaves R	Bryan Herta Autosport	Honda	85	+25.5357	4	21	0	32
15	3	(Brazil) Hélio Castroneves W	Team Penske	Chevrolet	85	+26.0659	5	15	0	30
16	22	(France) Simon Pagenaud	Team Penske	Chevrolet	85	+27.3185	4	4	0	28
17	4	(Monaco) Stefano Coletti R	KV Racing Technology	Chevrolet	85	+35.1645	4	20	0	26
18	15	(United States) Graham Rahal	Rahal Letterman Lanigan Racing	Honda	85	+36.4838	3	6	0	24
19	41	(United Kingdom) Jack Hawksworth	A. J. Foyt Racing	Honda	85	+38.9404	8	25	0	22
20	11	(France) Sébastien Bourdais	KVSH Racing	Chevrolet	85	+42.5956	5	16	0	20
21	67	(United States) Josef Newgarden	CFH Racing	Chevrolet	84	+1 Lap	3	2	0	18
22	26	(Colombia) Carlos Muñoz	Andretti Autosport	Honda	84	+1 Lap	5	12	0	16
23	19	(France) Tristan Vautier	Dale Coyne Racing	Honda	82	+3 Laps	6	23	0	14
24	20	(Italy) Luca Filippi	CFH Racing	Chevrolet	80	+5 Laps	4	13	0	12
25	7	(United Kingdom) James Jakes	Schmidt Peterson Motorsports	Honda	63	Accident	3	22	0	10
Fastest lap: (Brazil) Hélio Castroneves (Team Penske) - 1:19.4914 (Lap 5)
Race results

Notes

- ^1 - Points include 1 point for winning the pole position, 1 point for leading at least one lap, and 2 points for leading the most laps.

== Championship standings after the race ==
Drivers' Championship standings

	Pos.	Driver	Points
2	1	(New Zealand) Scott Dixon	556
1	2	(Colombia) Juan Pablo Montoya	556 (–0)
1	3	(Australia) Will Power	493 (–63)
2	4	(United States) Graham Rahal	490 (–66)
Unchanged	5	(Brazil) Hélio Castroneves	453 (–103)

Engine manufacturer standings

	Pos.	Manufacturer	Points
Unchanged	1	Chevrolet	1645
Unchanged	2	Honda	1179 (–466)

- Note: Only the top five positions are included.

== Broadcasting ==
The race was televised live on NBCSN. Leigh Diffey served as the anchor commentator, and Townsend Bell and Paul Tracy served as analysts. The pit reporters were Jon Beekhuis, Kevin Lee, Katie Hargitt, and Robin Miller. According to the Nielsen Company, the race averaged 841,000 viewers, and peaked with over a million viewers in the final full quarter hour of the broadcast. It was the most-watched cable broadcast of an IndyCar race since the 2008 SunTrust Indy Challenge, which aired on ESPN.

NBCSN
Booth Announcers	Pit/garage reporters
Announcer: Leigh Diffey; Color: Townsend Bell; Color: Paul Tracy	Jon Beekhuis; Kevin Lee; Katie Hargitt; Robin Miller

Previous race: 2015 ABC Supply 500	Verizon IndyCar Series; 2015 season	Next race: 2016 Firestone Grand Prix of St. Petersburg
Previous race: 2014 GoPro Indy Grand Prix of Sonoma	IndyCar Grand Prix of Sonoma	Next race: 2016 GoPro Grand Prix of Sonoma
