= 2002 Toyota Grand Prix of Long Beach =

Motor race held in Long Beach, California

(United States) 2002 Toyota Grand Prix of Long Beach
Race details
- Race 2 of 19 in the 2002 CART season
- Map of the Long Beach Street Circuit
- Date: April 14, 2002
- Official name: Toyota Grand Prix of Long Beach
- Location: Long Beach Street Circuit, Long Beach, California, United States
- Course: Temporary street circuit 1.968 mi / 3.167 km
- Distance: 90 laps 177.120 mi / 285.030 km
- Weather: Partly cloudy, cool

Pole position
- Driver: (United States) Jimmy Vasser (Team Rahal)
- Time: 1:07.742

Fastest lap
- Driver: (Brazil) Bruno Junqueira (Chip Ganassi Racing)
- Time: 1:08.981 (on lap 51 of 90)

Podium
- First: (United States) Michael Andretti (Team Motorola)
- Second: (United States) Jimmy Vasser (Team Rahal)
- Third: (Italy) Max Papis (Sigma Autosport)

Chronology
Previous	Next
2001	2003

The 2002 Toyota Grand Prix of Long Beach was a Championship Auto Racing Teams (CART) open-wheel race that was held on April 14, 2002 at a temporary street circuit in Long Beach, California. Contested over 90 laps, it was the second round of the 2002 CART FedEx Championship Series and the 28th running of the event (19th under CART sanctioning). Michael Andretti of Team Motorola won the race from the 15th starting position. Team Rahal's Jimmy Vasser finished second and Max Papis finished third for Sigma Autosport.

Vasser lapped the fastest time of Saturday's qualifying session and won his first pole position since 1999. Championship points leader Cristiano da Matta, who was quickest in qualifications on Friday, out-braked Vasser in the first turn and held the lead for 30 of the first 31 laps until a pit road collision with Adrián Fernández kept him out of contention for the win. Andretti, hoping to gain positions with his alternative pit strategy, assumed the lead until he made his mandatory stop on the 47th lap. Andretti's strategy proved effective when a caution flag was flown on lap 63, and he had built such a large gap over the rest of the field that he ducked in and out of pit road without losing the lead to Vasser. He then pulled away from Vasser after the final restart to earn the win.

The race had six cautions and eight lead changes among four different drivers. It marked Andretti's 42nd and final win in CART before retiring from full-time American open-wheel car racing competition in 2003. Despite being relegated to eighth place in the finishing order, da Matta still held the Drivers' Championship lead, as did Lola in the Constructors' Cup standings, while Honda claimed the first position in the Manufacturers' Cup standings with 17 races left in the season.

== Background ==
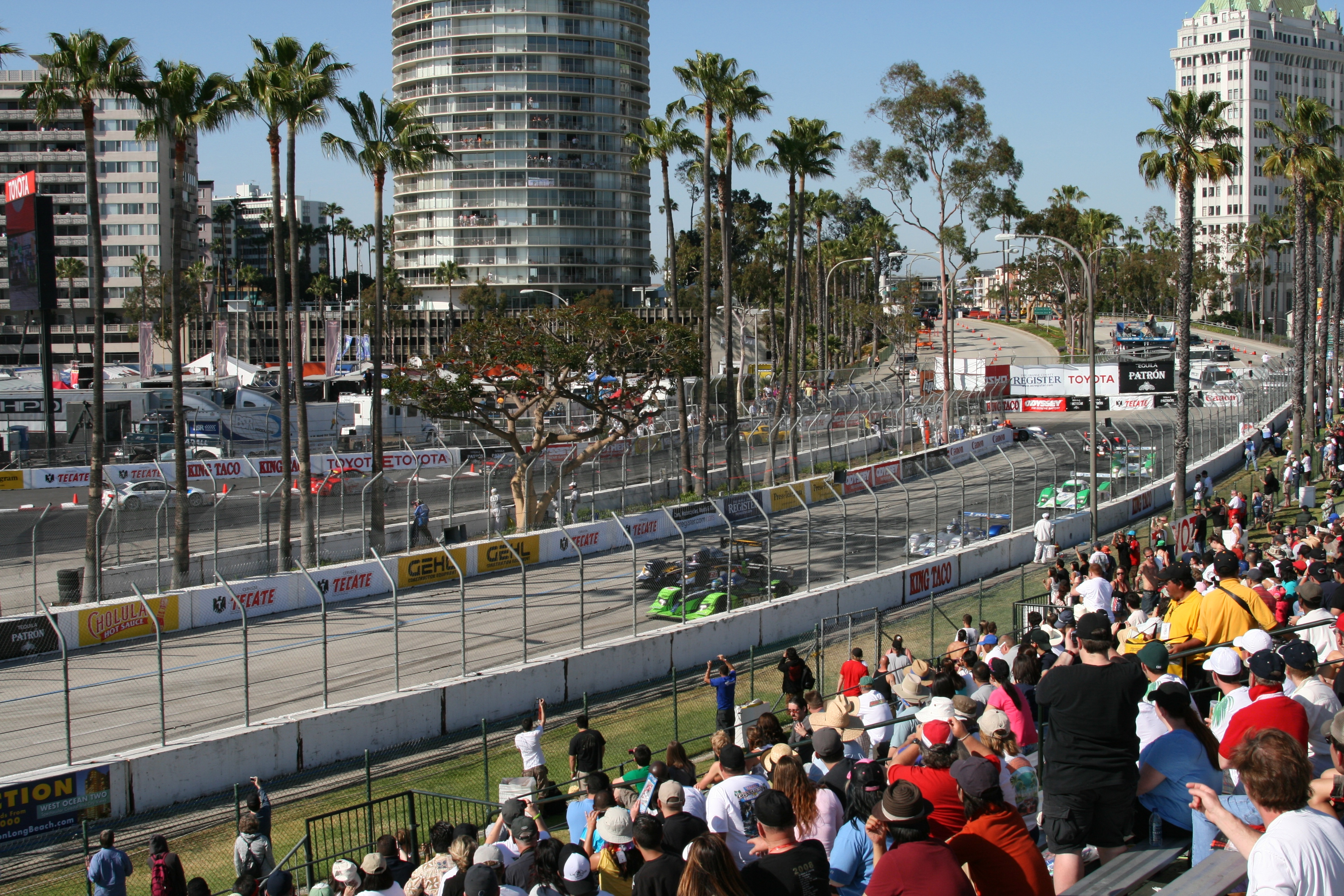
The streets of Long Beach (pictured in 2009), where the race was held.

The Toyota Grand Prix of Long Beach was the second of 19 scheduled races for the 2002 CART FedEx Championship Series, the 28th annual edition of the event dating back to 1975, and the 19th edition under Championship Auto Racing Teams (CART) sanctioning. It was held on April 14, 2002, in Long Beach, California, United States, at a temporary eleven-turn 1.968 mi (3.167 km) street circuit and was contested over 90 laps and 177.120 miles (285.047 km). As per CART's rules, every driver was required to make a pit stop after completing no more than 29 laps. Bridgestone, the series' lone tire supplier, brought seven sets of slick tires and four sets of wet-weather tires per car to Long Beach.

After winning the season-opening Tecate/Telmex Monterrey Grand Prix, Newman/Haas Racing driver Cristiano da Matta led the Drivers' Championship with 21 points, five more than Dario Franchitti in second and seven more than teammate Christian Fittipaldi in third. Michel Jourdain Jr. and Alex Tagliani rounded out the top-five with 12 and 10 points, respectively. In the Constructors' Cup standings, Lola led with 22 points while Reynard was second with 16. Toyota led the Manufacturers' Cup standings on 21 points, with Honda trailing by four points in second and Ford-Cosworth a further five points adrift in third.

Much of the media's attention was placed on da Matta heading into the event, as he had won the past three CART races dating back to the 2001 Honda Indy 300 and had a chance to become the third driver in series history to win four consecutive races. Da Matta spoke on the difficulties of creating a suitable racing setup for Long Beach and likened it to the Surfers Paradise Street Circuit because of its hard braking areas and long straightaways. Franchitti hoped to earn his first win of the season following a second-place finish in Fundidora Park and Team Green teammate Paul Tracy was also confident in his ability to win at Long Beach a third time.

For the first time, the Grand Prix of Long Beach was headed by Jim Michaelian, who was previously the chief operating officer of the event from 1998 to 2001. Michaelian replaced Chris Pook, the event's founder, as he took on the role of CART's president and CEO in December 2001. Michaelian was disappointed that Pook left his role, but lauded many of his decisions since becoming the series' president and CEO: "I hated to see Chris go, but his assuming the leadership of CART was the best thing that could have happened to the series." Pook was proud of how successful the Grand Prix of Long Beach had become, saying that "the venue is bigger than the show and you can't say that about every track."

== Practice and qualifying ==
There were two practice sessions that preceded the race on Sunday; the first session on Friday morning lasted for 90 minutes and the second session on Saturday morning ran for 75 minutes. Fittipaldi lapped the fastest time of the first practice session at 1 minute and 9.478 seconds, one tenth of a second quicker than da Matta in second and two tenths better than Tora Takagi in third, with Kenny Bräck and Oriol Servià in the fourth and fifth positions. Held under cloudy weather, Shinji Nakano and Tracy caused two red flags in the session when they spun off in the ninth and first corners, respectively, and stalled their engines.

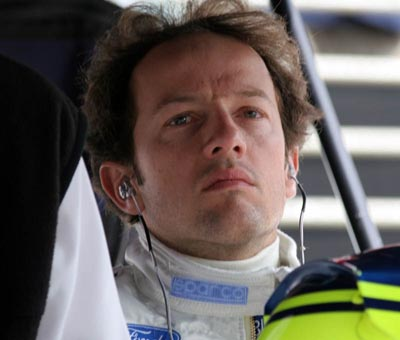
Cristiano da Matta (pictured in 2006) was fastest in Friday's qualifying session and qualified second overall.

Qualifying was split into two 60-minute sessions, one on Friday afternoon and one on Saturday afternoon. Each driver was permitted to complete up to 15 timed laps in each session, and the starting order would be determined by their fastest times. The fastest driver(s) of both sessions would earn one championship point and were guaranteed to start on the grid's front row for Sunday's race. If a driver were to cause a red flag or attempt a 16th lap, their fastest time would not be counted towards their starting position, and if a driver ran 17 or more laps, all of their times would be disallowed. Because of the qualifying procedure, no drivers completed a single lap throughout the first fifteen minutes of the first qualifying session, as they planned to optimize their speed towards the end of the session.

With less than two minutes left in the session, da Matta posted a lap of 1 minute and 9.092 seconds, which was enough for him to take the provisional pole position. Fittipaldi qualified second with a lap that was 0.128 seconds slower than da Matta's, and Jimmy Vasser, who held the pole position until da Matta's lap, fell to third. Vasser's Team Rahal teammate Jourdain Jr. had his quickest time barred for completing 16 laps, but his second-fastest time still placed him fourth on the provisional grid. Despite Bruno Junqueira's struggles with handling, he qualified fifth, with Tony Kanaan starting sixth. Tagliani occupied seventh, though he made contact with the turn-ten wall and damaged the nose of his car during his last lap, which he felt could have improved his position up to third had he not crashed. Bräck, Tracy, and Takagi rounded out the top ten, while Patrick Carpentier, Townsend Bell, Servià, Franchitti, Adrián Fernández, Michael Andretti, Mario Domínguez, and Nakano took the next eight positions. Max Papis spun into the tire barriers in turn eight, and was dropped to 19th place for prompting the only stoppage of the session. Scott Dixon complained of issues with his differentials, which left him 20th in the provisional starting order.

Junqueira led Saturday morning's practice session, the last of the weekend, with a 1 minute and 8.006 second-lap, besting second-placed Vasser by 0.122 seconds. Fittipaldi, da Matta, and Bräck were third- through fifth-fastest. Three red flags were issued in the session; the first was for Jourdain Jr. spinning and stalling in the fourth turn, the second for Dixon skidding off-course in turn eleven, and the third for Nakano losing control of his car in the eighth corner.

"It takes a little bit of luck to get a pole position. Shell guys did a great job all week along. Both of our cars have been good, like I said yesterday. Good to finally get a point in the season. Hopefully we'll have a clean race tomorrow."

— Jimmy Vasser, after the second qualifying session.

Overcast conditions returned for the second qualifying session, though the clouds partially subsided as the session progressed. After Vasser experienced an oil leak in his car during the second practice session, he resorted to a backup car for qualifying. He went on to clinch the eighth pole position of his career, and his first since the 1999 U.S. 500, with a time of 1 minute and 7.742 seconds. Vasser recorded his fastest time with five minutes and 30 seconds remaining, beating da Matta by 0.003 seconds. Chip Ganassi Racing teammates Junqueira and Bräck occupied the next two positions and Bell took fifth in what was the best qualifying effort of his career thus far. Kanaan stayed in sixth, ahead of seventh-placed Fernández, who felt that the red flags hindered him from posting a better time. Tracy qualified eighth, though he made contact with the turn-ten wall and punctured his right-rear tire late in the session. Fittipaldi caused one of three stoppages in the session when he spun and stalled in the ninth turn, leaving him ninth on the grid. Jourdain Jr., Tagliani, Takagi, Servià, and Nakano took the 10th through 14th positions. Andretti was left to start 15th after crashing into the turn-nine tire barriers as the session concluded. Franchitti and Domínguez both complained of ill-handling cars and took the 16th and 17th spots, while a malfunctioning gearbox prevented Papis from qualifying higher than 18th. Dixon started 19th and Carpentier completed the grid in 20th after driving over rumble strips in turn one and sliding into the outside wall.

=== Qualifying classification ===
The fastest lap in each of the two sessions is denoted in bold.

Pos.	No.	Driver	Team	Time		Grid
Pos.	No.	Driver	Team	Q1	Q2	Grid
1	8	(United States) Jimmy Vasser	Team Rahal	1:09.373	**1:07.742**	1
2	6	(Brazil) Cristiano da Matta	Newman/Haas Racing	**1:09.092**	1:07.745	2
3	4	(Brazil) Bruno Junqueira	Chip Ganassi Racing	1:09.549	1:08.097	3
4	12	(Sweden) Kenny Bräck	Chip Ganassi Racing	1:09.677	1:08.126	4
5	20	(United States) Townsend Bell	Patrick Racing	1:10.004	1:08.267	5
6	10	(Brazil) Tony Kanaan	Mo Nunn Racing	1:09.554	1:08.411	6
7	51	(Mexico) Adrian Fernández	Fernández Racing	1:10.480	1:08.448	7
8	26	(Canada) Paul Tracy	Team Green	1:09.825	1:08.484	8
9	11	(Brazil) Christian Fittipaldi	Newman/Haas Racing	1:09.220	1:08.637	9
10	9	(Mexico) Michel Jourdain Jr.	Team Rahal	1:09.548	1:08.647	10
11	33	(Canada) Alex Tagliani	Forsythe Racing	1:09.611	1:08.720	11
12	5	(Japan) Toranosuke Takagi	Walker Racing	1:09.866	1:08.754	12
13	17	(Spain) Oriol Servià	PWR Championship Racing	1:10.092	1:08.778	13
14	52	(Japan) Shinji Nakano	Fernández Racing	1:10.679	1:08.817	14
15	39	(United States) Michael Andretti	Team Motorola	1:10.544	1:08.856	15
16	27	(United Kingdom) Dario Franchitti	Team Green	1:10.107	1:08.915	16
17	16	(Mexico) Mario Domínguez	Herdez Competition	1:10.580	1:09.212	17
18	22	(Italy) Max Papis	Sigma Autosport	1:10.751	1:09.212	18
19	7	(New Zealand) Scott Dixon	PWR Championship Racing	1:11.142	1:09.613	19
20	32	(Canada) Patrick Carpentier	Forsythe Racing	1:09.883	1:09.890	20

== Warm-up ==
The drivers took to the track early Sunday morning for a half-hour warmup session in dry and cloudy weather. Dixon was the fastest driver of the session at 1 minute and 9.198 seconds, 0.028 seconds quicker than Kanaan in second place. Da Matta, Bräck, and Tagliani followed in the third through fifth positions. The lone red flag was necessitated one minute into the session, when Vasser made contact with Nakano as the two drivers raced side-by-side and expelled debris from his car; Franchitti also sustained damage to his front wing after hitting some of the debris.

== Race ==
Weather conditions towards the beginning of the race remained overcast; air temperatures were recorded at 69 to 74 °F (21 to 23 °C) and track temperatures ranged from 75 to 82 °F (24 to 28 °C). In the United States, live television coverage of the race was provided by Fox for the first time in series history, with Bob Varsha and Scott Pruett taking the roles of play-by-play commentators. The race was reportedly attended by around 100,000 people. During the warm-up laps, Carpentier spun into the turn-five wall due to a malfunctioning traction control system and was pushed to the garage. The green flag was waved by CART starter Jim Swintal at 12:43 p.m. local time (UTC−08:00) to mark the beginning of the race, and da Matta promptly swerved to the right-hand side of Vasser to overtake him in the first turn. Tracy had also improved from eighth to fourth place, while Kanaan took fifth place. A local caution flag was waved in the tenth corner to signal that Carpentier had rejoined the race.

On the fourth lap, Franchitti, Dixon, and Tagliani made their first pit stops in accordance with their race strategies; Dixon's stop was lengthened as his crew had trouble changing his left-rear tire. By lap nine, da Matta had extended his gap over Vasser to as much as 3.2 seconds, but lapped traffic helped Vasser trim the gap to 2.9 seconds three laps later. The attrition rate began to build on the 13th lap, as Dixon contacted the barrier exiting turn three; two laps later, Nakano briefly skidded into a run-off area in turn eight and continued. The first full-course caution flag was issued on lap 17, when Kanaan's car suffered an electrical failure and was parked in the third turn. All of the leaders made their stops under the caution period, and da Matta retained the first position ahead of the restart on lap 20, with Vasser, Bräck, Tracy, and Junqueira rounding out the top-five positions. On the 22nd lap, Junqueira was handed a drive-through penalty for a safety violation on pit road and drove to a runoff area in turn eight, while Carpentier retired at the turn-six runoff with a faulty gearbox.

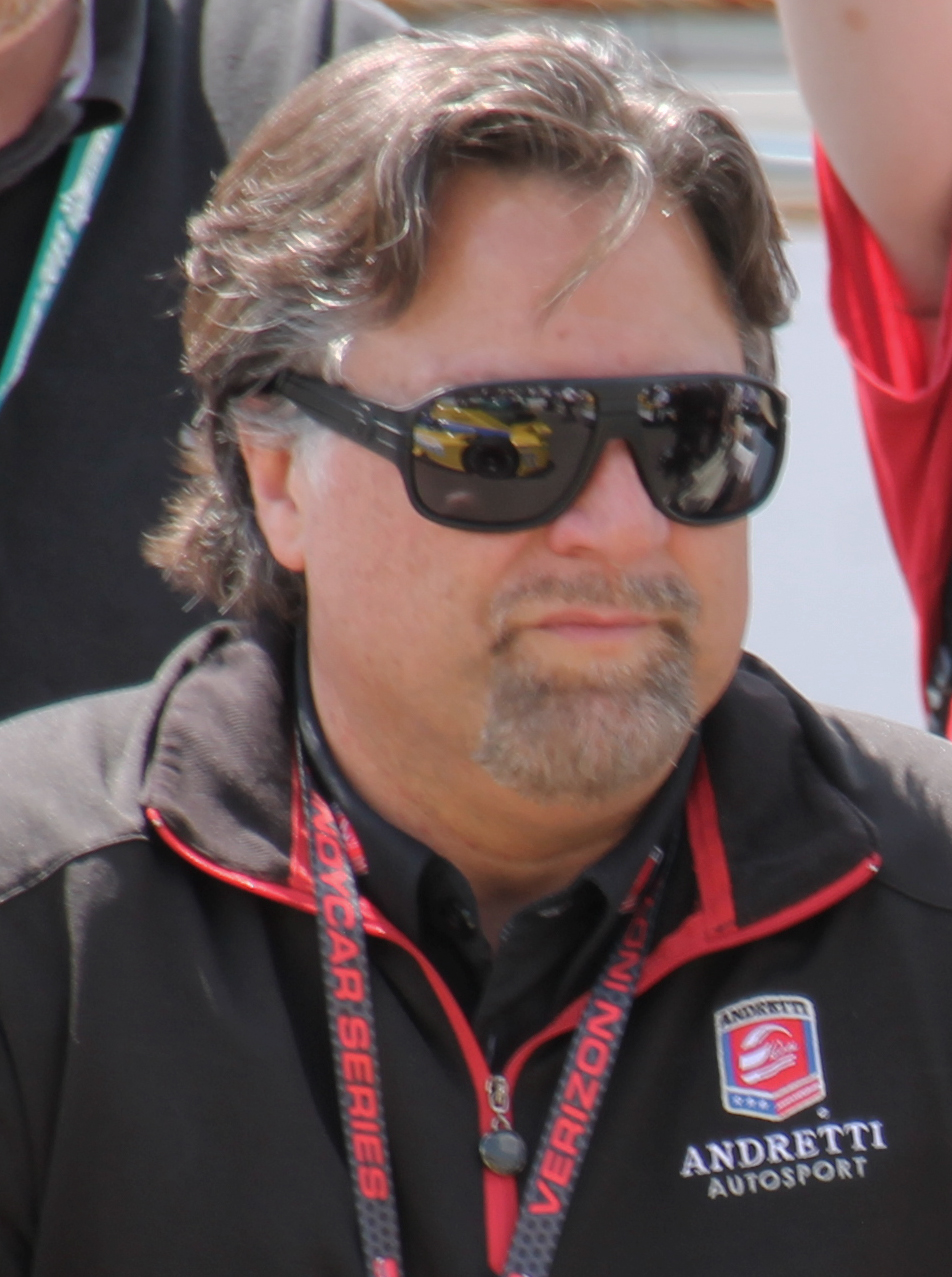
Michael Andretti (pictured in 2015) earned his 42nd and final career win with an alternate pit stop strategy.

Da Matta held a 3.6-second lead over Vasser until Dixon pulled over his car with a blown engine at the exit of pit road on lap 31, necessitating the race's second caution flag. During pit stop cycles, Fernández accidentally swerved into da Matta as he attempted to enter his pit stall, costing da Matta the lead. The collision also knocked one of Nakano's tires into his chief mechanic Steve Ragan, though Ragan was unhurt. By the time da Matta's car was restarted, he dropped to 16th in the running order. Meanwhile, Andretti—utilizing an alternative strategy—remained on the circuit and assumed the lead for the lap-37 restart, ahead of Papis, Vasser, Bräck, and Tracy. Tagliani spun in the eleventh turn and managed to continue. On the 46th lap, Papis entered pit road for his mandatory stop, as did leader Andretti the following lap, allowing Vasser and Bräck to take the first two positions. Andretti rejoined the race in the 13th position. On lap 52, the third caution was flown for Junqueira, who locked up his brakes and crashed into the tire barriers in the first corner. None of the top-12 drivers pitted under caution because they already stopped on lap 32 and were planning to make their final stop on lap 61, the limit of their pit interval.

Vasser led the field on the lap-56 restart, with Bräck in second, Fittipaldi in third, Jourdain Jr. in fourth, and Tracy in fifth. Behind them, Tagliani lost several positions and collided with Bell in between the second and third turns; the contact sent Bell's rear tires into the air. Tagliani was left in the middle of the course, and the race's fourth caution was flown as a result. Because Tagliani's car was quickly towed off-course, the green flag was waved again on the 59th lap with Vasser leading. All of the leaders made their mandatory final stops on lap 61, and Andretti stayed on-course and reclaimed the lead. The following lap, Fernández spun in turn two and quickly refired his car, while Fittipaldi was penalized for running over an air hose. On lap 63, Domínguez slid into the turn-one tire barriers from 11th place, which brought out the fifth caution of the race. Andretti and Papis had garnered a 34-second advantage over Vasser, who was driving on colder tires, which helped the two drivers maintain their positions under caution even after making their last stops of the race.

During the restart on lap 66, Andretti quickly pulled away from the rest of the field. Before Fittipaldi was able to serve his penalty, his car stopped near the entrance of pit road due to a gearbox failure, forcing him to retire. Vasser, meanwhile, was held up by Papis until he overtook him on lap 73, by which point Andretti held a four-second lead. Vasser began closing in on Andretti over the next eight laps, diminishing the gap between them to less than seven tenths of a second. The sixth (and final) caution of the race was issued on the 81st lap, when Servià suffered a mechanical issue in the sixth and seventh corners. Servià's car was removed from the course shortly thereafter and racing resumed on lap 83. Andretti was able to get up to speed faster than Vasser and held the lead for the remaining eight laps to earn his 42nd CART victory and his first at Long Beach since his inaugural win in the series in 1986. Vasser's second-place finish, 0.466 seconds behind Andretti, marked the first 1–2 finish for American drivers in the series since the 1996 Molson Indy Vancouver. Papis finished third, ahead of Bräck in fourth and Jourdain Jr. in fifth; Takagi, Tracy, da Matta, Franchitti, and Fernández were the last of the classified finishers. The lead was changed eight times between four different drivers during the course of the race. Andretti led twice for a total of 43 laps, more than any other driver.

=== Post-race ===
Andretti appeared in victory lane and later on the podium with Vasser and Papis to celebrate his win, which earned him $100,000. Andretti had tears in his eyes during victory lane celebrations; during a press conference, he expressed slight shock due to his poor performance throughout the weekend and admitted that he was "a little lucky" to have won. The win was not without controversy, however, as Team Motorola were later fined $20,000 for failing to meet CART's minimum height requirement for the underbody of Andretti's car, though the win and the points he earned withstood. It ended up being the last win of Andretti's premier American open-wheel car racing career before he became a co-owner of the renamed Andretti Green Racing team in 2003. Second-place finisher Vasser revealed that he was more focused on beating Bräck than Andretti, believing that he would not contend for the win at all. He conceded that he should have driven faster on his out lap. Papis, who finished third, was ecstatic that he earned the first podium finish for Sigma Autosport, equaling it to a win, because of the team's lack of sponsorship compared to others.

Da Matta was let down with his eighth-place finish and spoke on his pit road collision with Fernández: "It was a big mistake to let this one get away. The car was running strong and the team was strong. I saw Adrian coming in as I was merging in from my pit box. I didn't expect him to brake and turn in so quickly. I don't blame him and I also don't think I did anything wrong." Fernández seemed to place the blame on his team's mistimed communication for the crash, commenting: "They called da Matta out when I was coming in and I was already ahead of him. They just threw him right in front of me." Tagliani, who wrecked on the 56th lap with Bell, was disappointed by the accident and stated that Bell "should have been more patient." Despite Servià's mechanical failure on lap 79, he still looked forward to the first oval race of the season, the Bridgestone Potenza 500 at Twin Ring Motegi, in order to find the team's overall weak spots.

Media reception to the race was largely positive. Towards the end of the Fox broadcast of the race, which earned a 1.0 rating and a share of two, Scott Pruett said the race was "the essence of CART." John Zimmermann of the Speed Channel wrote: "The race had everything anyone with an appreciation for the finer aspects of the sport could want—whether or not there were too many full-course yellows." He also contrasted the attendance rates of this race and the Indy Racing League-sanctioned Yamaha Indy 400, also held in California a month prior, which only mustered about 15,000 spectators. In a poll hosted by CART at the end of the year, fans voted the Long Beach race as the fifth-best race of the season.

The final result meant that da Matta continued to hold the Drivers' Championship lead with 27 points, while Andretti's victory tied him with Jourdain Jr. for second place in the standings on 22 points. Franchitti improved to fourth with 20 points, two more than Papis in fifth. Lola remained the leader of the Constructors' Cup with 39 points, though their gap over Reynard diminished to two points. Honda advanced to the lead for the Manufacturers' Cup on 38 points, with Toyota trailing by five points and Ford-Cosworth by nine points as 17 races remained in the season.

=== Race classification ===
Drivers who scored championship points are denoted in bold.

Pos	No.	Driver	Team	Laps	Time/Retired	Grid	Points
1	39	(United States) **Michael Andretti**	**Team Motorola**	90	2:02:14.542	15	**21**^{1}
2	8	(United States) **Jimmy Vasser**	**Team Rahal**	90	+0.466	1	**17**^{2}
3	22	(Italy) **Max Papis**	**Sigma Autosport**	90	+4.698	18	**14**
4	12	(Sweden) **Kenny Bräck**	**Chip Ganassi Racing**	90	+5.250	4	**12**
5	9	(Mexico) **Michel Jourdain Jr.**	**Team Rahal**	90	+7.488	10	**10**
6	5	(Japan) **Toranosuke Takagi**	**Walker Racing**	90	+8.330	12	**8**
7	26	(Canada) **Paul Tracy**	**Team Green**	90	+10.129	8	**6**
8	6	(Brazil) **Cristiano da Matta**	**Newman/Haas Racing**	90	+10.823	2	**6**^{3}
9	27	(United Kingdom) **Dario Franchitti**	**Team Green**	90	+11.460	16	**4**
10	51	(Mexico) **Adrian Fernández**	**Fernández Racing**	90	+35.789	7	**3**
11	17	(Spain) **Oriol Servià**	**PWR Championship Racing**	79	Turbocharger	13	**2**
12	52	(Japan) **Shinji Nakano**	**Fernández Racing**	73	Fuel pressure	14	**1**
13	11	(Brazil) Christian Fittipaldi	Newman/Haas Racing	67	Gearbox	9	
14	16	(Mexico) Mario Domínguez	Herdez Competition	62	Accident	17	
15	20	(United States) Townsend Bell	Patrick Racing	57	Accident	5	
16	33	(Canada) Alex Tagliani	Forsythe Racing	55	Accident	11	
17	4	(Brazil) Bruno Junqueira	Chip Ganassi Racing	51	Accident	3	
18	7	(New Zealand) Scott Dixon	PWR Championship Racing	30	Engine	19	
19	32	(Canada) Patrick Carpentier	Forsythe Racing	20	Gearbox	20	
20	10	(Brazil) Tony Kanaan	Mo Nunn Racing	16	Electrical	6	

Notes

- **^1** — Includes one bonus point for leading the most laps.
- **^2** — Includes one bonus point for recording the quickest time of Saturday's qualifying session.
- **^3** — Includes one bonus point for recording the quickest time of Friday's qualifying session.

== Standings after the race ==
Drivers' Championship standings
	Pos.	Driver	Points
Unchanged	1	(Brazil) Cristiano da Matta	27
11	2	(United States) Michael Andretti	22 (–5)
1	3	(Mexico) Michel Jourdain Jr.	22 (–5)
2	4	(United Kingdom) Dario Franchitti	20 (–7)
4	5	(Italy) Max Papis	18 (–9)

Constructors' Cup standings
Pos.	Constructor	Points
1	(United Kingdom) Lola	39
2	(United Kingdom) Reynard	37 (–2)

Manufacturers' Cup standings
	Pos.	Manufacturer	Points
1	1	(Japan) Honda	38
1	2	(Japan) Toyota	33 (–5)
	3	(United Kingdom) Ford-Cosworth	29 (–9)

- Note: Only the top five positions are included for the Drivers' Championship standings.

Previous race: 2002 Tecate/Telmex Monterrey Grand Prix	CART FedEx Championship Series; 2002 season	Next race: 2002 Bridgestone Potenza 500
Previous race: 2001 Toyota Grand Prix of Long Beach	Grand Prix of Long Beach	Next race: 2003 Toyota Grand Prix of Long Beach
