= 2001 Toyota Grand Prix of Long Beach =

Motor race held in Long Beach, California

(United States) 2001 Toyota Grand Prix of Long Beach
Race details
Race 2 of 21 in the 2001 CART season
| ← Previous race | Next race → |
- Map of Long Beach Street Circuit
- Date: April 8, 2001
- Official name: Toyota Grand Prix of Long Beach
- Location: Long Beach Street Circuit; Long Beach, California, United States
- Course: Temporary street circuit 1.968 mi / 3.167 km
- Distance: 82 laps 161.376 mi / 259.694 km

Pole position
- Driver: (Brazil) Hélio Castroneves (Team Penske)
- Time: 1:08.556

Fastest lap
- Driver: (Brazil) Hélio Castroneves (Team Penske)
- Time: 1:08.992 (on lap 71 of 82)

Podium
- First: (Brazil) Hélio Castroneves (Team Penske)
- Second: (Brazil) Cristiano da Matta (Newman-Haas Racing)
- Third: (Brazil) Gil de Ferran (Team Penske)

Chronology
| Previous | Next |
|---|---|
| 2000 | 2002 |

The 2001 Toyota Grand Prix of Long Beach was a Championship Auto Racing Teams (CART) open-wheel race held on April 8, 2001 on a temporary street circuit in Long Beach, California before 90,000 spectators. It was the second round of the 2001 CART FedEx Championship Series and the 27th annual running of the event (18th under CART's sanctioning). The 82-lap race was won by Team Penske driver Hélio Castroneves. Cristiano da Matta of Newman/Haas Racing finished second and Castroneves' teammate Gil de Ferran came in third.

Castroneves won the pole position after posting the quickest lap in qualifying. He was trailed by second-place qualifier Kenny Bräck in the opening laps, though Bräck was forced to retire on the 32nd lap after stalling his engine during a pit stop. Da Matta then became Castroneves' biggest threat for the win and repeatedly tried to overtake him, to no avail. Castroneves led all 82 laps and earned his fourth CART victory.

As a result of the race, Castroneves improved from eighth to third in the Drivers' Championship, while podium finishers da Matta and de Ferran remained first and second, respectively. Meanwhile, Lola and Reynard were tied for the Constructors' Championship lead and Honda eked ahead of Toyota in the Manufacturers' Championship by one point.

== Background ==
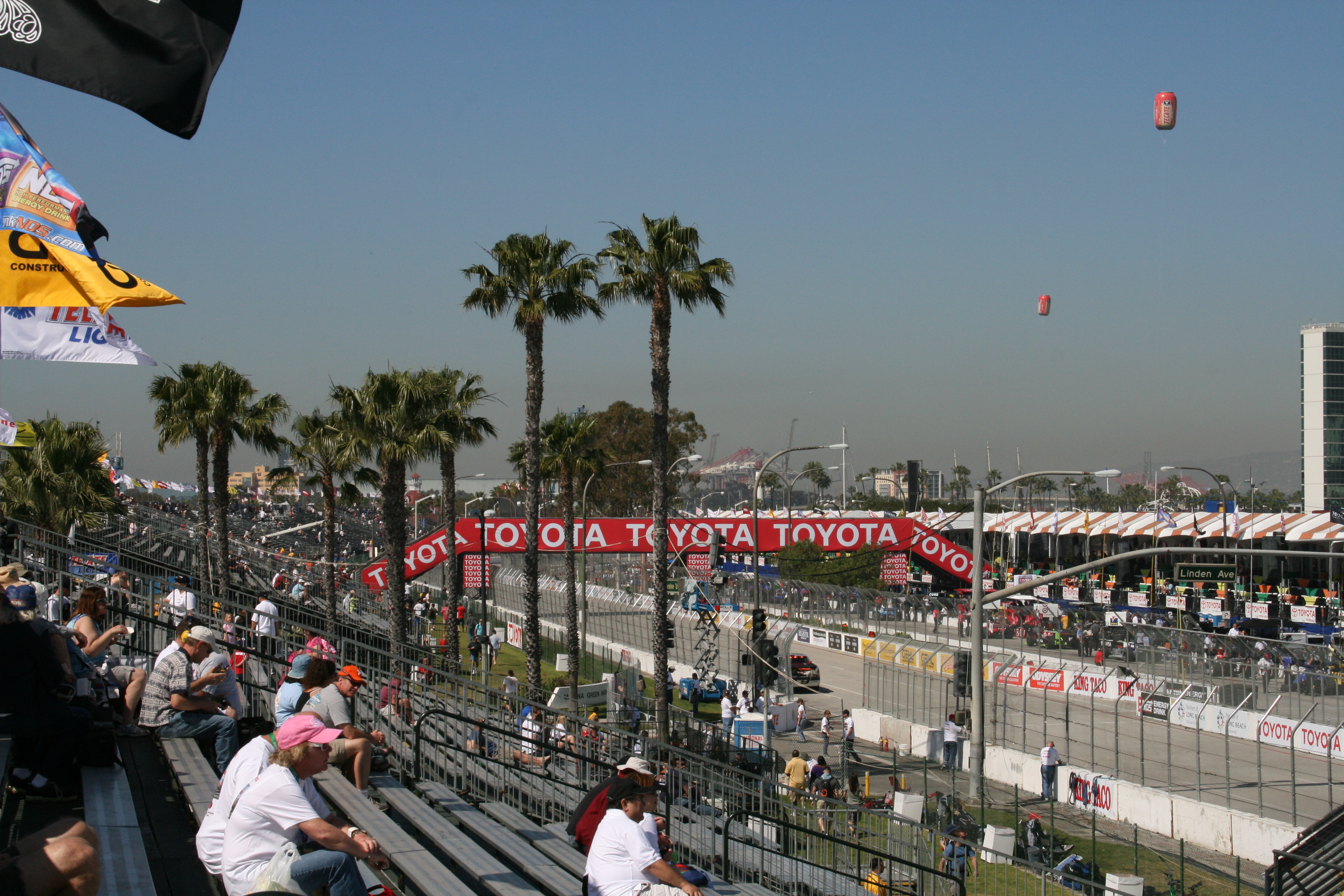
The Streets of Long Beach (pictured in 2009), where the race was held.

The Toyota Grand Prix of Long Beach was the second of 21 scheduled open-wheel races for the 2001 CART FedEx Championship Series, the 27th annual edition of the event dating back to 1975, and the 18th edition under CART's sanctioning. It was held on April 8, 2001, in Long Beach, California, United States, at a temporary eleven-turn 1.968 mi (3.167 km) street circuit, with a scheduled race distance of 82 laps and 161.376 miles (259.709 km).

Heading into the race, Cristiano da Matta led the Drivers' Championship with 21 points, five ahead of Gil de Ferran in second and seven more than third-placed Paul Tracy. Michael Andretti, with 12 points, and Kenny Bräck, with 11 points, took the fourth and fifth positions, respectively. In the Constructors' Championship, Lola held the lead with 22 points as Reynard stood second on 16. With 21 points, Toyota led the Manufacturers' Championship by five points over Honda in second, ten over Ford-Cosworth in third, and 21 over Phoenix in fourth.

Da Matta—the winner of the preceding Grand Prix of Monterrey—revealed that his team would be utilizing a different racing setup for the weekend due to the track's bumpy surface and hoped to earn his second consecutive win. Andretti believed that maintaining fuel mileage and grip on the rear tires was very important in succeeding in Long Beach and aimed to finish within the top-five to gain more points. Alex Zanardi, who won at Long Beach in 1997 and 1998, was excited to return to the track and was confident that he could finish well, even if he is grouped with the slower competitors in qualifying. Bräck predicted that most drivers would overtake each other at the front stretch and praised the track's setting, although he felt that the configuration of the track was "not spectacular."

== Practice ==
Three practice sessions preceded the race on Sunday, two on Friday and one on Saturday. The first session lasted 120 minutes, the second 105 minutes, and the third 75 minutes. Temperatures on Friday were initially cool, but increased as the day progressed. The first practice session on Friday morning was delayed by 28 minutes after a vendor truck knocked over a fire extinguisher, resulting in a broken water main at the fourth corner. Alex Tagliani led the session with a time of 1 minute and 9.147 seconds, beating Tony Kanaan, Patrick Carpentier, Dario Franchitti, and Bryan Herta. Several competitors drove off-course and the session was briefly halted to retrieve the cars of Hélio Castroneves, Oriol Servià, and Luiz Garcia Jr., all of whom stalled at separate parts of the track.

Kanaan's time of 1 minute and 7.759 seconds in the second practice session was the fastest overall lap of Friday's two sessions; Servià was second and ahead of Tracy in third, Castroneves in fourth, and Carpentier in fifth. During the session, da Matta and Adrián Fernández slid into the turn-nine tire barriers, while Bruno Junqueira crashed into the tire barrier at the eighth corner. None of the drivers suffered serious damage. Sporadic rain showers dampened the circuit on Saturday morning, resulting in numerous spins throughout the third practice session involving Jimmy Vasser, de Ferran, Fernández, Herta, Shinji Nakano, and Max Papis. Bräck lapped fastest in the session with a time of 1 minute and 20.941 seconds, with Carpentier, Junqueira, Papis, and Christian Fittipaldi rounding out the top-five.

== Qualifying ==
During the 75-minute qualifying session on Saturday afternoon, the drivers were split into two groups which were each allowed 30 minutes on the circuit, with a 15-minute interval in between the groups. Ahead of qualifying, the rainfall subsided and the support series completed their practice sessions, which helped to add grip to the track surface. Rain showers returned towards the end of the first group's session and CART mandated every car in the second group to use rain tires, but most switched back to slick tires once the rain receded again. Castroneves earned his fifth career pole position with a time of 1 minute and 8.556 seconds on his final timed lap of the session, besting second-place driver Bräck by 0.541 seconds. Kanaan qualified third, da Matta fourth, and de Ferran fifth. Franchitti applied too much force to his brakes during his last timed lap and took sixth. Michel Jourdain Jr. was the quickest driver of the first group and held the pole position until the final three minutes of qualifying, after which he was knocked to the seventh position in what was still the best qualifying effort of his career. Vasser, in eighth, was forced to resort to a backup car due to his incident in the practice session earlier that day.

Andretti, Fittipaldi, Tagliani, and Tracy occupied the ninth through twelfth positions. Papis experienced oversteer throughout the session and was left 13th, ahead of the highest-qualifying rookie driver Nicolas Minassian in 14th, Herta in 15th, Tora Takagi in 16th, Carpentier in 17th, Scott Dixon in 18th, Maurício Gugelmin in 19th, and Zanardi in 20th. Max Wilson slammed into a wall at the exit of the eighth turn, leaving him in 21st. Roberto Moreno started 22nd, his worst qualifying result at Long Beach, due to persistent gearbox issues, while Nakano took 23rd. Servià's promising lap times in qualifying were hampered by a broken ignition coil, leaving him to start a disappointing 24th. The constant red flags issued during qualifying prevented Michael Krumm and Dale Coyne Racing teammate Garcia Jr. from starting higher than 25th and 27th, respectively. The pair of drivers were separated by Fernández, who started from the 26th position after spinning at the eleventh turn. Junqueira crashed on his first timed lap and rainfall returned by the time his team had prepared a backup car. His quickest time was over 31 seconds slower than Castroneves', which left him to start 28th.

=== Qualifying classification ===
| Pos | No. | Driver | Team | Time | Speed | Grid |
|---|---|---|---|---|---|---|
| 1 | 3 | (Brazil) Hélio Castroneves | Team Penske | 1:08.556 | 103.343 | 1 |
| 2 | 8 | (Sweden) Kenny Bräck | Team Rahal | 1:09.097 | 102.534 | 2 |
| 3 | 55 | (Brazil) Tony Kanaan | Mo Nunn Racing | 1:09.223 | 102.347 | 3 |
| 4 | 6 | (Brazil) Cristiano da Matta | Newman/Haas Racing | 1:09.312 | 102.216 | 4 |
| 5 | 1 | (Brazil) Gil de Ferran | Team Penske | 1:09.344 | 102.169 | 5 |
| 6 | 27 | (Scotland) Dario Franchitti | Team Green | 1:09.366 | 102.136 | 6 |
| 7 | 16 | (Mexico) Michel Jourdain Jr. | Bettenhausen Racing | 1:09.589 | 101.809 | 7 |
| 8 | 40 | (United States) Jimmy Vasser | Patrick Racing | 1:09.807 | 101.491 | 8 |
| 9 | 39 | (United States) Michael Andretti | Team Motorola | 1:09.853 | 101.424 | 9 |
| 10 | 11 | (Brazil) Christian Fittipaldi | Newman/Haas Racing | 1:09.999 | 101.213 | 10 |
| 11 | 33 | (Canada) Alex Tagliani | Forsythe Racing | 1:10.013 | 101.193 | 11 |
| 12 | 26 | (Canada) Paul Tracy | Team Green | 1:10.073 | 101.106 | 12 |
| 13 | 7 | (Italy) Max Papis | Team Rahal | 1:10.093 | 101.077 | 13 |
| 14 | 12 | (France) Nicolas Minassian | Chip Ganassi Racing | 1:10.099 | 101.068 | 14 |
| 15 | 77 | (United States) Bryan Herta | Forsythe Racing | 1:10.146 | 101.001 | 15 |
| 16 | 5 | (Japan) Toranosuke Takagi | Walker Racing | 1:10.202 | 100.920 | 16 |
| 17 | 32 | (Canada) Patrick Carpentier | Forsythe Racing | 1:10.272 | 100.820 | 17 |
| 18 | 18 | (New Zealand) Scott Dixon | PacWest Racing | 1:10.303 | 100.775 | 18 |
| 19 | 17 | (Brazil) Maurício Gugelmin | PacWest Racing | 1:10.670 | 100.252 | 19 |
| 20 | 66 | (Italy) Alex Zanardi | Mo Nunn Racing | 1:10.675 | 100.245 | 20 |
| 21 | 25 | (Brazil) Max Wilson | Arciero Brooke Racing | 1:10.683 | 100.233 | 21 |
| 22 | 20 | (Brazil) Roberto Moreno | Patrick Racing | 1:10.769 | 100.112 | 22 |
| 23 | 52 | (Japan) Shinji Nakano | Fernández Racing | 1:11.871 | 98.577 | 23 |
| 24 | 22 | (Spain) Oriol Servià | Sigma Autosport | 1:11.919 | 98.511 | 24 |
| 25 | 19 | (Germany) Michael Krumm | Dale Coyne Racing | 1:11.974 | 98.436 | 25 |
| 26 | 51 | (Mexico) Adrian Fernández | Fernández Racing | 1:12.403 | 97.852 | 26 |
| 27 | 21 | (Brazil) Luiz Garcia Jr. | Dale Coyne Racing | 1:16.483 | 92.632 | 27 |
| 28 | 4 | (Brazil) Bruno Junqueira | Chip Ganassi Racing | 1:39.916 | 70.908 | 28 |

== Warm-up ==
On Sunday, most of the drivers took to the track at 9:00 a.m. Pacific Standard Time (UTC−08:00) for a thirty-minute warmup session under cold yet sunny conditions. The lone exception was Kanaan, whose team repaired an oil leak in his car. The session featured three stoppages, the first two for Minassian and Garcia Jr. stalling their cars and the third for Fernández crashing into the inside wall at the tenth turn and subsequently damaging his front wing and right-front tire. Fittipaldi lapped the quickest time of the session at 1 minute and 9.993 seconds, almost two tenths of a second faster than pole sitter Castroneves; Bräck was third, Carpentier fourth, and Nakano fifth.

== Race ==
The constant precipitation on Saturday had cleared up in time for the race as air temperatures rose to 65 °F (18 °C) and a brisk wind gusted over the circuit at 20 mph (32 km/h). An estimated 90,000 people attended the event. During the pace laps, the rear of Vasser's car began trailing smoke, though it quickly dissipated, as Castroneves' fuel gauge had failed. The race began at 1:12 p.m. and Castroneves quickly pulled ahead of Bräck in the first turn to maintain his pole position advantage. One of Tagliani's tires was punctured after Tracy struck the rear of his car, forcing him to make a pit stop and lose a lap to the leaders. Andretti's car suddenly experienced a terminal engine issue on lap 3 and he resultantly became the first retiree of the race. Castroneves held a 1.1-second lead over Bräck before the first full-course caution flag was issued on the tenth lap when Garcia Jr. slid into the tire barriers in turn eight and sustained moderate damage to the nose of his car.

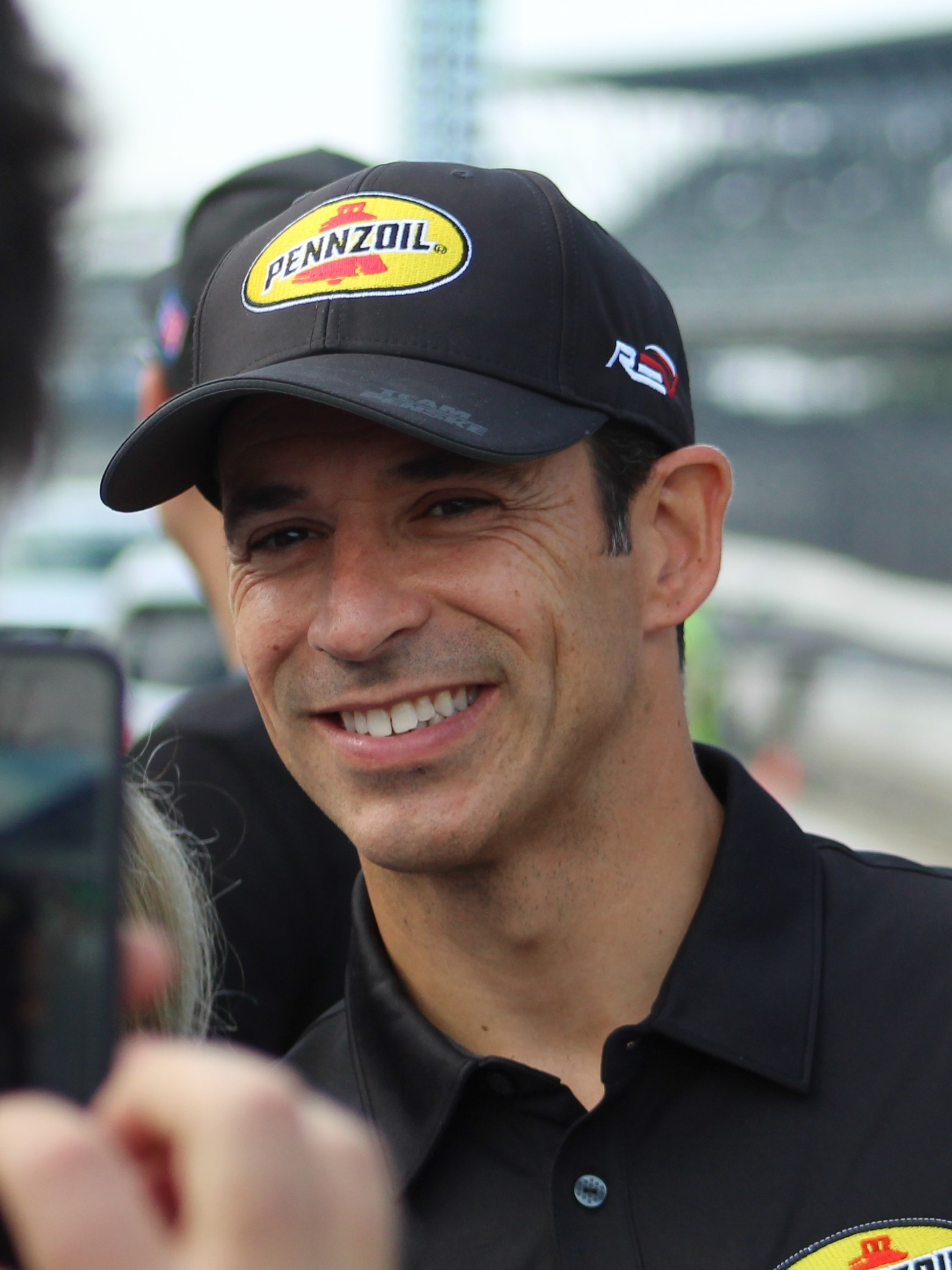
Hélio Castroneves (pictured in 2018) led every lap from the pole position and won the race, his fourth win in CART.

The top-13 drivers chose not to make a pit stop and Castroneves led the field on the restart at lap 13. De Ferran overtook Kanaan for the fourth position three laps later. As Bräck defended the second position from Fittipaldi, Wilson had troubles with his gearbox that caused him to spin into the turn-nine tire barriers on the 19th lap. Although Wilson's rear wing fell off of his car, the green flag remained as he restarted his car and drove to pit road. Zanardi's suspension and cooling system were damaged after Junqueira hit the back end of his car and he retired on lap 28, while Fittipaldi experienced mechanical issues of his own—falling from 12th to 16th six laps earlier—and pitted that same lap to change his steering wheel in hopes that it would alleviate his issues. On lap 30, Takagi was spun from behind by Gugelmin at the ninth turn, necessitating the second caution flag. The top 11 drivers made pit stops under the caution period. Bräck was relegated to the rear of the field after his engine stalled during his pit stop.

Castroneves sustained his lead with a quick pit stop and he led the field back up to speed on the lap-32 restart, followed by da Matta and Vasser, while Bräck was knocked out of the race with mechanical troubles. Fittipaldi was handed a drive-through penalty two laps later for exceeding the 50 mph (80 km/h) speed limit during the caution. By the 45th lap, Castroneves only garnered a 0.5-second lead over da Matta, while Takagi spun in the first turn and quickly drove away. Four laps later, Tracy moved into sixth place by out-braking his Team Green teammate Franchitti as they entered turn one. Jourdain Jr. made a pit stop from the ninth position to refuel his car on lap 50, but he was issued a drive-through penalty for exiting pit road 1 mph (1.6 km/h) faster than the speed limit. On the 55th lap, Carpentier hit the back of Papis' car, destroying Papis' rear wing and momentarily launching Carpentier into the air in turn five. This incident, along with Dixon concurrently spinning into the tire barriers in turn nine, prompted the third caution. All of the leaders made their final stops for fuel during the caution period. As the drivers were preparing for an upcoming restart, Gugelmin was punted from behind by Moreno at turn six on lap 60, lengthening the caution period.

The race resumed on lap 63, with Castroneves leading ahead of da Matta and de Ferran. Tracy quickly overtook Vasser for the fourth position in the first corner. Over the next twelve laps, da Matta made several attempts to pass Castroneves and remained within half a second of him, but Castroneves continued defending the first position. On the 75th lap, Takagi spun into the tire barriers in turn one, necessitating the fourth caution of the race. None of the leaders made stops and the green flag was issued again on lap 78. Castroneves maintained the lead for the final four laps to earn his fourth career win in CART and first of the season. It also marked Team Penske's first win at Long Beach since 1995. Da Matta finished 0.534 seconds behind Castroneves in second; de Ferran took third, Tracy fourth, and Vasser fifth. The remaining points-scoring positions were rounded out by Franchitti, Kanaan, Minassian, Junqueira, Herta, Moreno, and Nakano, while Jourdain Jr., Servià, Krumm, Fernández, Papis, Tagliani, and Dixon were the final classified finishers. There were four cautions and no lead changes during the course of the race, meaning that Castroneves had led all 82 laps.

=== Post-race ===
The top-three drivers appeared on the podium to collect their trophies, with Castroneves earning $100,000 for the win. During a post-race press conference, a jubilant Castroneves thanked his team for providing quick pit stops, saying: "What a fantastic day for everyone at Marlboro Team Penske. The guys on the Team did a terrific job in the pits keeping me out front all day. My second pit stop was especially important because they got me out in front of (Cristiano) da Matta where we were able to stay until the end." Second-place finisher da Matta was content with his final result and complimented Castroneves' driving style: "It was a great finish for Texaco/Havoline and Toyota in a race they sponsor. The weekend got better and better since Friday but I didn't have anything left for Hélio today. He drove well and he deserved the win. I don't think he blocked me, any driver would have done the same." De Ferran was similarly pleased with his third-place finish, stating: "The car was very, very good in handling, probably the best car I've ever had. I was just trying to save fuel. It was a very smooth day for us, everything was very good. I am very happy being on the podium today."

Carpentier's lap-55 collision with Papis caused his left wrist to slam against the carbon fiber wall in his cockpit, fracturing a bone in the process. He was evaluated by CART's orthopedic consultant Dr. Terry Trammell in Indianapolis, Indiana on Monday and underwent surgery on Tuesday. Despite the injury, Carpentier was permitted to compete in the forthcoming Firestone Firehawk 600 at Texas Motor Speedway. He said of his crash: "I was convinced that he was in some kind of trouble, so I went to pass him on the inside. That's when he cut me off. I tried to avoid him but I hit the speed bump and that launched me into the air and into the back of Max (Papis') car." Papis explained: "All I knew is that I just got hit from behind. I have no idea what happened. It's a shame what happened to Patrick (Carpentier)."

Carpentier's Forsythe Racing teammate Tagliani was frustrated at Tracy for making contact with him on the first lap and "didn't buy" the apology that Tracy gave him after the race. Tracy still felt remorse and stated: "I locked up the brakes and hit (Alex Tagliani) on the first lap. All I can do is apologize, it's my fault." Moreno was also sorry for wrecking fellow Brazilian driver Gugelmin: "Basically, everybody accelerated out of the corner and I looked down to change the map on the dash and when I looked up they had all stopped. I just couldn't catch it in time. There is no excuse for it, I made a mistake and I can only apologize at this point. I am really sorry because Mauricio is a good friend of mine, but all I can do is apologize publicly.” Gugelmin expressed annoyance over the incident, although he praised track marshals for moving several walls in the fourth and sixth corners and adding new catch fences to the circuit.

The race result meant that da Matta maintained his lead in the Drivers' Championship with 37 points, while de Ferran stood in second place on 30, three points ahead of teammate Castroneves and four ahead of Tracy. Vasser rounded out the top-five with 18 points. Lola and Reynard were tied for the lead in the Constructors' Championship, having each earned 18 points. In the Manufacturers' Championship, Honda assumed the lead on 38 points, one more than Toyota. Ford-Cosworth, with 14 points, stood third, while Phoenix had yet to earn a point with 19 races left in the season.

=== Race classification ===
| Pos | No. | Driver | Team | Laps | Time/Retired | Grid | Pts. |
|---|---|---|---|---|---|---|---|
| 1 | 3 | (Brazil) Hélio Castroneves | Team Penske | 82 | 1:52:17.779 | 1 | 22^{1} |
| 2 | 6 | (Brazil) Cristiano da Matta | Newman/Haas Racing | 82 | +0.534 | 4 | 16 |
| 3 | 1 | (Brazil) Gil de Ferran | Team Penske | 82 | +1.787 | 5 | 14 |
| 4 | 26 | (Canada) Paul Tracy | Team Green | 82 | +2.435 | 12 | 12 |
| 5 | 40 | (United States) Jimmy Vasser | Patrick Racing | 82 | +3.342 | 8 | 10 |
| 6 | 27 | (Scotland) Dario Franchitti | Team Green | 82 | +4.855 | 6 | 8 |
| 7 | 55 | (Brazil) Tony Kanaan | Mo Nunn Racing | 82 | +5.915 | 3 | 6 |
| 8 | 12 | (France) Nicolas Minassian | Chip Ganassi Racing | 82 | +6.749 | 14 | 5 |
| 9 | 4 | (Brazil) Bruno Junqueira | Chip Ganassi Racing | 82 | +7.565 | 28 | 4 |
| 10 | 77 | (United States) Bryan Herta | Forsythe Racing | 82 | +11.169 | 15 | 3 |
| 11 | 20 | (Brazil) Roberto Moreno | Patrick Racing | 82 | +11.588 | 22 | 2 |
| 12 | 52 | (Japan) Shinji Nakano | Fernández Racing | 82 | +12.364 | 23 | 1 |
| 13 | 16 | (Mexico) Michel Jourdain Jr. | Bettenhausen Racing | 82 | +13.458 | 7 | |
| 14 | 22 | (Spain) Oriol Servià | Sigma Autosport | 82 | +18.602 | 24 | |
| 15 | 19 | (Germany) Michael Krumm | Dale Coyne Racing | 82 | +20.583 | 25 | |
| 16 | 51 | (Mexico) Adrian Fernández | Fernández Racing | 81 | +1 lap | 26 | |
| 17 | 7 | (Italy) Max Papis | Team Rahal | 81 | +1 lap | 13 | |
| 18 | 33 | (Canada) Alex Tagliani | Forsythe Racing | 81 | +1 lap | 11 | |
| 19 | 18 | (New Zealand) Scott Dixon | PacWest Racing | 81 | +1 lap | 18 | |
| 20 | 5 | (Japan) Toranosuke Takagi | Walker Racing | 74 | Contact | 16 | |
| 21 | 25 | (Brazil) Max Wilson | Arciero Brooke Racing | 67 | Contact | 21 | |
| 22 | 17 | (Brazil) Maurício Gugelmin | PacWest Racing | 59 | Contact | 19 | |
| 23 | 32 | (Canada) Patrick Carpentier | Forsythe Racing | 53 | Contact | 17 | |
| 24 | 11 | (Brazil) Christian Fittipaldi | Newman/Haas Racing | 47 | Electrical | 10 | |
| 25 | 8 | (Sweden) Kenny Bräck | Team Rahal | 31 | Gearbox | 2 | |
| 26 | 66 | (Italy) Alex Zanardi | Mo Nunn Racing | 27 | Overheating | 20 | |
| 27 | 21 | (Brazil) Luiz Garcia Jr. | Dale Coyne Racing | 18 | Handling | 27 | |
| 28 | 39 | (United States) Michael Andretti | Team Motorola | 3 | Electrical | 9 | |

Notes

- ^1 – Includes two bonus points for leading the most laps and being the fastest qualifier.

== Standings after the race ==
Drivers' Championship standings
| | Pos. | Driver | Points |
|---|---|---|---|
| | 1 | (Brazil) Cristiano da Matta | 37 |
| | 2 | (Brazil) Gil de Ferran | 30 (–7) |
| 5 | 3 | (Brazil) Hélio Castroneves | 27 (–10) |
| 1 | 4 | (Canada) Paul Tracy | 26 (–11) |
| 1 | 5 | (United States) Jimmy Vasser | 18 (–19) |

Constructors' Championship standings
| Pos. | Constructor | Points |
|---|---|---|
| 1 | (United Kingdom) Lola | 38 |
| 2 | (United Kingdom) Reynard | 38 (–0) |

Manufacturers' Championship standings
| | Pos. | Manufacturer | Points |
|---|---|---|---|
| 1 | 1 | (Japan) Honda | 38 |
| 1 | 2 | (Japan) Toyota | 37 (–1) |
| | 3 | (United Kingdom) Ford-Cosworth | 14 (–24) |
| | 4 | (United Kingdom) Phoenix | 0 (–38) |

| Previous race: 2001 Tecate/Telmex Monterrey Grand Prix | CART FedEx Championship Series; 2001 season | Next race: 2001 Firestone Firehawk 600 |
| Previous race: 2000 Toyota Grand Prix of Long Beach | Toyota Grand Prix of Long Beach | Next race: 2002 Toyota Grand Prix of Long Beach |
