= 2001 Tecate/Telmex Grand Prix of Monterrey =

Motor race held in Monterrey, Mexico

(Mexico) 2001 Tecate/Telmex Grand Prix of Monterrey
Race details
Race 1 of 21 in the 2001 CART season
← Previous race	Next race →
- Date: March 11, 2001
- Official name: Tecate/Telmex Grand Prix of Monterrey Presented by Herdez
- Location: Fundidora Park, Monterrey, Mexico
- Course: Permanent racing facility 2.104 mi / 3.386 km
- Distance: 78 laps 164.112 mi / 264.113 km

Pole position
- Driver: (Sweden) Kenny Bräck (Team Rahal)
- Time: 1:15.244

Fastest lap
- Driver: (Scotland) Dario Franchitti (Team Green)
- Time: 1:15.403 (on lap 59 of 78)

Podium
- First: (Brazil) Cristiano da Matta (Newman/Haas Racing)
- Second: (Brazil) Gil de Ferran (Team Penske)
- Third: (Canada) Paul Tracy (Team Green)

The 2001 Tecate/Telmex Grand Prix of Monterrey was a Championship Auto Racing Teams (CART) motor race held on March 11, 2001, in Monterrey, Mexico at Fundidora Park before 116,000 spectators. The 78-lap race was the first of the 2001 CART FedEx Championship Series and the inaugural running of the event. Cristiano da Matta of Newman/Haas Racing won the race; Gil de Ferran finished second and Paul Tracy came in third.

After lapping the fastest time in qualifying, Kenny Bräck won the pole position and dominated the first half of the race, only conceding the lead to rookie competitor Scott Dixon, who chose not to make a pit stop during a caution period. However, Bräck was suddenly hampered by brief engine issues, allowing da Matta to overtake him for the lead on lap 43. Da Matta remained largely unchallenged for the rest of the race, only giving up the lead to Dario Franchitti during a cycle of green-flag pit stops, and earned his second CART victory. In addition, da Matta, Lola, and Toyota earned the lead in the Drivers' Championship, Constructors' Championship, and Manufacturers' Championship, respectively. The scheduled distance of 80 laps was curtailed to meet the two-hour time limit.

The race was deemed a success among journalists, drivers, and race organizers, prompting CART to host a second event in Mexico beginning in 2002. The Grand Prix of Monterrey remained on CART's schedule until 2006.

== Background ==
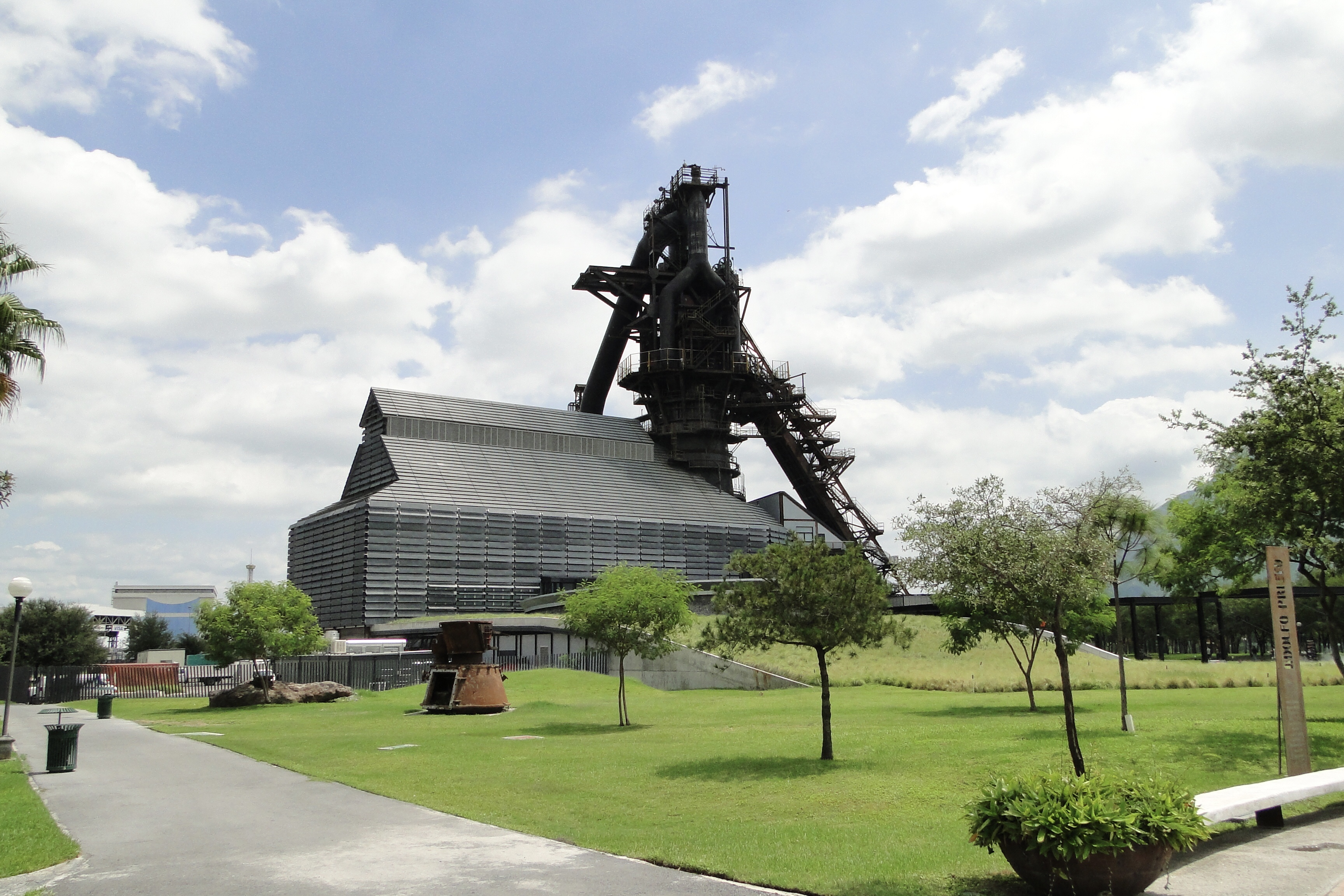
Fundidora Park (pictured in 2009), where the race was held.

The Tecate/Telmex Grand Prix of Monterrey was the first of 21 scheduled open-wheel races for the 2001 CART FedEx Championship Series and the inaugural running of the event. It was held on March 11, 2001, in Monterrey, Nuevo León, Mexico, at Fundidora Park, a public park which was converted to a 12-turn, 2.104 mi (3.386 km) road course circuit, and was scheduled to be contested over 80 laps and 168.32 miles (270.88 km).

The event, which marked the series' first race in Mexico since 1981, was organized by CART team owners Pat Patrick and Gerald Forsythe. CART Chairman and CEO Andrew Craig explained that the race gave the series a presence throughout all of North America and provided additional value to many of the series' sponsors. The race was also expected to economically benefit Monterrey, especially its hotel industry, and increase tourism in the city.

Although Team Penske retained their drivers from the previous season, Hélio Castroneves and reigning series champion Gil de Ferran, the months leading up to the 2001 season were full of drivers swapping teams. Chip Ganassi Racing notably changed their entire driver lineup, replacing Juan Pablo Montoya (who began racing in Formula One) and Jimmy Vasser with former International Formula 3000 drivers Bruno Junqueira and Nicolas Minassian. With Adrián Fernández driving for his self-owned Fernández Racing alongside Shinji Nakano, Vasser took Fernández's seat at Patrick Racing and 2000 Formula Nippon champion Tora Takagi took Nakano's seat in Walker Racing. At Newman/Haas Racing, Cristiano da Matta replaced Michael Andretti, who ended a six-year partnership with the team to join Team Green's satellite organization, Team Motorola. Mark Blundell departed PacWest Racing due to his poor finishes over the past two seasons and was replaced by 2000 Indy Lights champion Scott Dixon. The newly formed Arciero Brooke Racing signed rookie competitor Max Wilson. After a two-year absence from the series, Alex Zanardi returned in a second entry for Mo Nunn Racing.

The race at Monterrey debuted a new engine formula that CART mandated which reduced the maximum amount of manifold pressure from 40 inches (1,000 mm) to 37 inches (940 mm) in an attempt to decrease the cars' speeds and improve competitiveness. Castroneves and de Ferran both anticipated the race in Monterrey, despite the latter's lack of testing with the new aerodynamic package in the offseason. Da Matta and Christian Fittipaldi both acknowledged the uncertainties of preparing a racing setup at a circuit which the drivers had not raced on before, with da Matta commenting that "no one will still have it completely figured out." Paul Tracy believed the challenges of the new track in Monterrey would "level the playing field" and expressed excitement after completing several tests in the offseason. Fernández—one of two Mexican drivers competing in the race—aimed to avoid driving aggressively in order to finish well; he also admitted that he was suffering from wrist pain caused by intersection syndrome.

== Practice ==
Three practice sessions preceded the race on Sunday, two on Friday and one on Saturday. The sessions ran for 120 minutes on Friday morning, 105 minutes on Friday afternoon, and 90 minutes on Saturday morning. Castroneves lapped the fastest time of the first session at 1 minute and 43.539, nearly three seconds quicker than second-place Fittipaldi; Michael Krumm, Roberto Moreno, and Maurício Gugelmin rounded out the top five. Despite the session being held under warm and sunny conditions, several drivers opted to use rain tires to navigate through the slickened track surface. CART Chief Steward Chris Kneifel called off the first session after 40 minutes and allowed the support series to commence their practice sessions in order to add grip to the surface. The second practice session was also extended by 30 minutes.

De Ferran became the fastest driver of the day during the second session by posting a time of 1 minute, 18.581 seconds, beating da Matta, Castroneves, Kenny Bräck, and Patrick Carpentier. Six red flags were issued during the session; the first was for a collision in turn ten involving Castroneves and Tracy, the second for Andretti spinning and Minassian subsequently stalling in turn eleven, the third for a track clean-up, the fourth for Junqueira spinning and stalling in turn eleven, the fifth for Carpenter spinning and stalling in turn two, and the sixth for Tracy slamming into a wall at the exit of turn twelve.

On Saturday morning, the weather conditions had become cloudy and teams utilized rain tires once again, although no rain was forecasted to interrupt on-track activity. Dario Franchitti led the third practice session with a fastest time of 1 minute and 16.349 seconds. De Ferran was three tenths of a second slower in second, followed by da Matta in third, Tony Kanaan fourth, and Dixon fifth. The session was paused for 28 minutes to repair a dislodged layer of bricks beneath the turf in the fifth and sixth turns. After a stoppage for a spin involving da Matta in turn four, the session was brought to an early end when Zanardi's engine burst into flames on the front stretch. While Zanardi was uninjured, the incident forced him to resort to a backup car.

== Qualifying ==
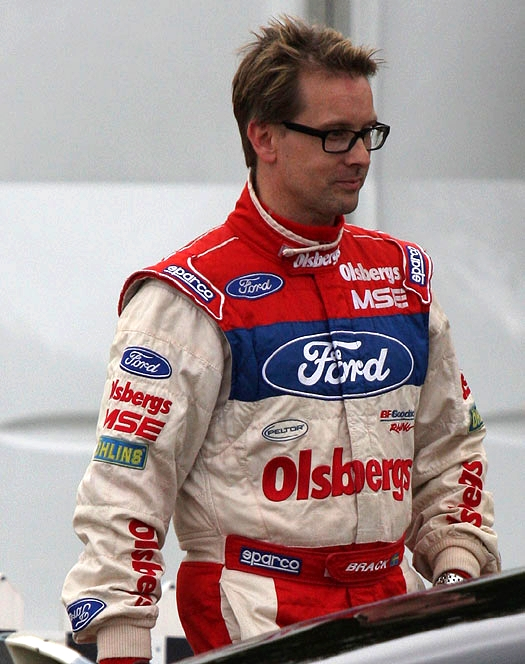
Kenny Bräck (pictured in 2012) won the first pole position of his CART career.

Saturday afternoon's 75-minute qualifying session implemented a new format which split the competitors into two groups based on their placement in the Drivers' Championship the previous season. Each group was permitted 30 minutes of time to put down laps, with a 15-minute interval in between the groups, and the race's starting order would be determined by the drivers' fastest laps. Conditions cooled during the qualifying session, which improved the track surface and increased speeds. Bräck earned his first career pole position with a fastest time of 1 minute and 15.244 seconds. He was joined on the grid's front row by da Matta, who was 0.195 seconds slower and held the pole position until Bräck's lap. De Ferran persevered through extreme stomach pains to qualify third, one spot ahead of teammate Castroneves, while Andretti's lap at the end of the session improved his position from the middle of the grid to fifth. Despite spinning in turn two, Carpentier matched his career-best qualifying effort on road courses in sixth. Franchitti, Oriol Servià, and Patrick Racing teammates Vasser and Moreno rounded out the top-ten qualifiers.

Max Papis struggled with a loss of grip as the session progressed and qualified 11th, ahead of Kanaan in 12th and Alex Tagliani in 13th. Dixon, who took 14th, was the highest-qualifying rookie in the grid. Tracy only mustered a 15th-place qualifying effort due to his poorly handling car. Fittipaldi, in 16th, experienced numerous mechanical issues throughout the weekend and complained of a lack of grip. Gugelmin, Bryan Herta, Fernández (who spun in turn four with one minute left in the session), and Junqueira took the remaining positions in the top-20. Minassian believed traffic prevented him from qualifying higher than 21st. Zanardi took 22nd, with Krumm in 23rd, Michel Jourdain Jr. 24th, Takagi 25th, and Wilson 26th. Nakano caused the lone stoppage of the qualifying session on his sixth lap when he spun into the tire barrier in turn seven, leaving him to start 27th. Luiz Garcia Jr. had difficulties with oversteer and took the 28th and final position on the grid.

=== Qualifying classification ===
Pos	No.	Driver	Team	Time	Speed	Grid
1	8	(Sweden) Kenny Bräck	Team Rahal	1:15.244	100.665	1
2	6	(Brazil) Cristiano da Matta	Newman/Haas Racing	1:15.439	100.404	2
3	1	(Brazil) Gil de Ferran	Team Penske	1:15.551	100.255	3
4	3	(Brazil) Hélio Castroneves	Team Penske	1:15.580	100.217	4
5	39	(United States) Michael Andretti	Team Motorola	1:16.104	99.527	5
6	32	(Canada) Patrick Carpentier	Forsythe Racing	1:16.353	99.202	6
7	27	(Scotland) Dario Franchitti	Team Green	1:16.375	99.174	7
8	22	(Spain) Oriol Servià	Sigma Autosport	1:16.44	99.084	8
9	40	(United States) Jimmy Vasser	Patrick Racing	1:16.456	99.069	9
10	20	(Brazil) Roberto Moreno	Patrick Racing	1:16.484	99.032	10
11	7	(Italy) Max Papis	Team Rahal	1:16.512	98.996	11
12	55	(Brazil) Tony Kanaan	Mo Nunn Racing	1:16.647	98.822	12
13	33	(Canada) Alex Tagliani	Forsythe Racing	1:16.716	98.733	13
14	18	(New Zealand) Scott Dixon	PacWest Racing	1:16.826	98.592	14
15	26	(Canada) Paul Tracy	Team Green	1:16.909	98.485	15
16	11	(Brazil) Christian Fittipaldi	Newman/Haas Racing	1:16.937	98.449	16
17	17	(Brazil) Maurício Gugelmin	PacWest Racing	1:17.005	98.362	17
18	77	(United States) Bryan Herta	Forsythe Racing	1:17.137	98.194	18
19	51	(Mexico) Adrian Fernández	Fernández Racing	1:17.270	98.025	19
20	4	(Brazil) Bruno Junqueira	Chip Ganassi Racing	1:17.505	97.728	20
21	12	(France) Nicolas Minassian	Chip Ganassi Racing	1:17.750	97.646	21
22	66	(Italy) Alex Zanardi	Mo Nunn Racing	1:17.851	97.294	22
23	19	(Germany) Michael Krumm	Dale Coyne Racing	1:17.914	97.215	23
24	16	(Mexico) Michel Jourdain Jr.	Bettenhausen Racing	1:18.381	96.636	24
25	5	(Japan) Toranosuke Takagi	Walker Racing	1:18.991	95.889	25
26	25	(Brazil) Max Wilson	Arciero Brooke Racing	1:19.294	95.523	26
27	52	(Japan) Shinji Nakano	Fernández Racing	1:19.362	95.441	27
28	21	(Brazil) Luiz Garcia Jr.	Dale Coyne Racing	1:20.931	93.591	28

== Warm-up ==
The drivers took to the track on Sunday at 11:00 AM CST (UTC−06:00) for a 30-minute warmup session. Castroneves turned the quickest lap of the session with a time of 1 minute and 16.425 seconds, besting second-fastest driver Bräck by four tenths of a second. Andretti was third, Junqueira fourth, and Kanaan fifth. Garcia Jr., Junqueira, and Papis all drove off-course and Jourdain Jr.'s car expelled debris onto the track, although the red flag was not issued until Garcia Jr. spun and stalled in turn one with two minutes remaining, forcing the session to prematurely end.

== Race ==
As sunlight remerged above the circuit, weather conditions warmed significantly, with air temperatures reaching 86 °F (30 °C) and track temperatures measuring around 106 °F (41 °C). Multiple accidents were expected to occur throughout the race, especially at instances when the field would be bunched together. Mexican businessman José Antonio Fernández Carbajal and Governor of Nuevo León Fernando Canales Clariond commanded the drivers to start their engines and the green flag was waved at 3:06 PM CST to signify the start of the race. Bräck used the pole position to his advantage and pulled ahead of da Matta at the exit of the first corner, while Castroneves passed de Ferran for third. Behind the leaders, Zanardi made slight contact with Minassian and sent Junqueira spinning in the seventh turn. Junqueira stalled and restarted his car with the assistance of track marshals, although he was assessed a drive-through penalty for pulling away while a tow rope was still attached to his car. Junqueira, now two laps behind the leaders, contacted the rear of Minassian's car on lap 6 and received no damage.

Bräck's 3.8-second lead was diminished when Wilson crashed into the turn-twelve wall while attempting to pass Minassian on the ninth lap, resulting in the first full-course caution flag of the race. Fittipaldi and Zanardi were among the few competitors who made pit stops for fuel. Bräck remained on the track and led the field back up to speed at the restart on lap 14, ahead of da Matta and Castroneves. Eight laps later, Fittipaldi spun at the exit of turn twelve, but quickly restarted his car. Moreno slid into the marbles at the same corner on lap 23 and slammed into the wall, prompting the second caution. Many of the leaders, including Bräck, used the caution period to fill up their fuel tanks. A small fire was ignited and extinguished on the right side of Kanaan's car. Dixon, Herta, and Fernández, meanwhile, stayed on the track and inherited the first three positions when the race resumed on lap 28, although Fernández was quickly relegated to seventh place as Bräck improved to third. That same lap, Zanardi collided with Andretti and spun at the exit of turn five. He drove off with the track marshals' assistance.

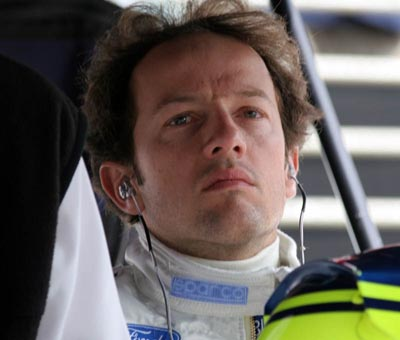
Cristiano da Matta (pictured in 2006) led the final 18 laps and earned his second CART victory.

Herta gave up the second position to refuel his car on lap 36; he rejoined the race in 22nd. Two laps later, Dixon made a pit stop for fuel and ceded the lead to Bräck, while Carpentier retired from the race after smoke began spewing from his car. On the 40th lap, Zanardi hit the rear of Nakano's car and sent both cars off-course in the fifth corner. While Nakano was able to continue, Zanardi's damage was deemed terminal and he retired from the race. Bräck held a three-second lead over da Matta until his engine briefly stalled on lap 43, allowing da Matta to take the first position. Takagi spun and made no contact while entering pit road on the 48th lap. Meanwhile, the battle for the lead began to intensify on lap 53 as Bräck overtook da Matta in turn ten, but drove off-course and lost the lead in the next corner. He then closed the gap on da Matta on lap 56 and attempted to pass him in turn six, only to apply the brakes with excessive force and lose more ground. Bräck finally made his stop at the end of that same lap, along with Tracy and Kanaan.

Da Matta stayed on-track until the 57th lap, when he, de Ferran, Andretti, and Tagliani made stops for fuel. Franchitti assumed the lead in the meantime and set the fastest lap of the race on lap 59. He made his stop two laps later and rejoined the race in third, behind da Matta and de Ferran, but was handed a drive-through penalty for exceeding the speed limit on pit road and fell to ninth. On lap 64, Bräck drove off-course in turn one and quickly regained control. Da Matta held a 4.3-second lead over de Ferran before Fittipaldi slammed the wall at turn twelve, causing the third full-course caution to be flown. Under the caution period, Kniefel announced that the race would end when it reached a duration of two hours. Herta was the lone driver to make a pit stop for fuel. Dixon was also expected to pit, but stayed on the track due to miscommunication with his team. Da Matta led at the lap-73 restart and held the lead for the remaining five laps to earn his second CART win, 1.982 seconds ahead of de Ferran. Tracy finished third, Andretti fourth, and Bräck fifth. The top-ten finishers were rounded out by Vasser, Kanaan, Castroneves, Franchitti, and Takagi, while the final classified finishes were Minassian, Papis, Dixon, Servià, Gugelmin, Herta, Jourdain Jr., and Nakano. There were five lead changes among four different drivers and three caution periods throughout the race. Da Matta led on two occasions for 32 laps, more than any other competitor.

=== Post-race ===
The top three drivers appeared on the podium to celebrate their respective finishes, with da Matta earning $100,000 for his win. During a post-race press conference, da Matta expressed gratitude towards his team for their diligence during the offseason: "The biggest thing of all was we worked very, very hard this off-season. The engineers and everybody were very focused on what we were doing, and were very, very methodical. I see now, it paid off." Second-placed de Ferran was taken to a local hospital immediately after his podium appearance due to his stomach pains, which were worsened by gastroenteritis. Regarding his illness, he later said: "It was unfortunate that I became sick because I wasn't able to eat anything since Saturday morning and I really was feeling bad. Once I got in the car, all of the enthusiasm from the great fans in Mexico kept me going." Tracy was pleased with his third-place result despite his many adversities in the weekend, stating: "We were disappointed with our qualifying yesterday, but we knew we'd have a good car for the race. We're going to have to have about 20 more days like this to win the championship."

Andretti was happy with finishing fourth, although he believed that his best performance of the season was still yet to come. Bräck was conversely disappointed with his fifth-place finish and confused by his engine issues which cost him the victory: "I was coming around one of the turns and "boom" - the engine cut off all of a sudden. It took me half a second to recycle it and turn it back on, but after that we didn't have a problem all race." Fernández explained his decision not to make a pit stop during the final caution period after running out of fuel with three laps remaining: "If we would have stopped, we would have finished at the end of the line and it wasn't worth it. Our only hope was for another yellow to help us finish the race. Sometimes you have to do that, and this time we were a little bit more optimistic than other times." Zanardi took accountability for his poor outing in his return to CART and admitted that he should have been more patient during the race.

With 116,000 spectators attending the race and 318,000 spectators attending the weekend's festivities, the event was considered a massive success for CART's return to Mexico. David Phillips of SpeedVision called the event a "much-needed grand slam for CART," and Autoweek's J. P. Vettraino regarded the race as a "winner," despite issues with the track conditions during the practice sessions. Veteran motorsports journalist Robin Miller praised the fans for acting "enthusiastic, yet respectful" and bringing an "electric atmosphere." Fernando Canales Clariond was pleased with the event, stating: "We broke a world record for a first-time event. Monterrey is now known all over the world as a place where quality things happen. From my point of view, not only did we pass this first test, we got an 'A', and we'll get better." The race's success spurred a second event in Mexico which was held on Autódromo Hermanos Rodríguez and included on the series' schedule beginning in 2002. The result gave da Matta the lead in the Drivers' Championship with 21 points, five more than de Ferran in second and seven more than Tracy in third. Andretti took fourth with 12 points and Bräck was fifth on 11. In the Constructors' Championship, Lola held the first position on 21 points, with Reynard trailing by four points. Toyota earned the lead in the Manufacturers' Championship with 21 points; Honda took second place on 16 points, Ford-Cosworth was third with 11, and Phoenix was left fourth without any points as twenty races remained in the season.

=== Race classification ===
Pos	No.	Driver	Team	Laps	Time/Retired	Grid	Pts.
1	6	(Brazil) Cristiano da Matta	Newman/Haas Racing	78	2:00:44.856	2	21^{1}
2	1	(Brazil) Gil de Ferran	Team Penske	78	+1.982	3	16
3	26	(Canada) Paul Tracy	Team Green	78	+2.802	15	14
4	39	(United States) Michael Andretti	Team Motorola	78	+4.931	5	12
5	8	(Sweden) Kenny Bräck	Team Rahal	78	+5.411	1	11^{2}
6	40	(United States) Jimmy Vasser	Patrick Racing	78	+5.710	9	8
7	55	(Brazil) Tony Kanaan	Mo Nunn Racing	78	+6.375	12	6
8	3	(Brazil) Hélio Castroneves	Team Penske	78	+7.244	4	5
9	27	(Scotland) Dario Franchitti	Team Green	78	+7.580	7	4
10	5	(Japan) Toranosuke Takagi	Walker Racing	78	+17.457	25	3
11	12	(France) Nicolas Minassian	Chip Ganassi Racing	78	+24.227	21	2
12	7	(Italy) Max Papis	Team Rahal	78	+24.981	11	1
13	18	(New Zealand) Scott Dixon	PacWest Racing	78	+31.435	14	
14	22	(Spain) Oriol Servià	Sigma Autosport	78	+32.354	8	
15	17	(Brazil) Maurício Gugelmin	PacWest Racing	78	+32.733	17	
16	77	(United States) Bryan Herta	Forsythe Racing	78	+33.745	18	
17	16	(Mexico) Michel Jourdain Jr.	Bettenhausen Racing	78	+34.376	24	
18	52	(Japan) Shinji Nakano	Fernández Racing	76	+2 laps	27	
19	51	(Mexico) Adrian Fernández	Fernández Racing	75	Out of fuel	19	
20	11	(Brazil) Christian Fittipaldi	Newman/Haas Racing	66	Contact	16	
21	33	(Canada) Alex Tagliani	Forsythe Racing	60	Overheating	13	
22	4	(Brazil) Bruno Junqueira	Chip Ganassi Racing	57	Water leak	20	
23	19	(Germany) Michael Krumm	Dale Coyne Racing	51	Mechanical	23	
24	66	(Italy) Alex Zanardi	Mo Nunn Racing	39	Contact	22	
25	32	(Canada) Patrick Carpentier	Forsythe Racing	38	Electronics	6	
26	21	(Brazil) Luiz Garcia Jr.	Dale Coyne Racing	37	Mechanical	28	
27	20	(Brazil) Roberto Moreno	Patrick Racing	21	Contact	10	
28	25	(Brazil) Max Wilson	Arciero Brooke Racing	7	Contact	26	

Notes

- ^1 – Includes one bonus point for leading the most laps.
- ^2 – Includes one bonus point for being the fastest qualifier.

== Standings after the race ==
Drivers' Championship standings
	Pos.	Driver	Points
Unchanged	1	(Brazil) Cristiano da Matta	21
Unchanged	2	(Brazil) Gil de Ferran	16 (–5)
Unchanged	3	(Canada) Paul Tracy	14 (–7)
Unchanged	4	(United States) Michael Andretti	12 (–9)
Unchanged	5	(Sweden) Kenny Bräck	11 (–10)

Constructors' Championship standings
Pos.	Constructor	Points
1	(United Kingdom) Lola	21
2	(United Kingdom) Reynard	17 (–4)

Manufacturers' Championship standings
Pos.	Manufacturer	Points
1	(Japan) Toyota	21
2	(Japan) Honda	16 (–5)
3	(United Kingdom) Ford-Cosworth	11 (–10)
4	(United Kingdom) Phoenix	0 (–21)
Sources:

- Note: Only the top five positions are included for the drivers' standings.

Previous race: 2000 Marlboro 500	CART FedEx Championship Series; 2001 season	Next race: 2001 Toyota Long Beach Grand Prix
Previous race: —	Tecate/Telmex Grand Prix of Monterrey	Next race: 2002 Tecate/Telmex Monterrey Grand Prix
