= 2014 GoPro Indy Grand Prix of Sonoma =

(United States) 2014 Sonoma
Race details
- 17th round of the 2014 IndyCar Series season
- Date: August 24, 2014
- Official name: GoPro Grand Prix of Sonoma
- Location: Sonoma Raceway
- Course: Permanent racing facility 2.303 mi / 3.706 km
- Distance: 85 laps 195.755 mi / 315.037 km

Pole position
- Driver: (Australia) Will Power (Team Penske)

Podium
- First: (New Zealand) Scott Dixon (Chip Ganassi Racing)
- Second: (United States) Ryan Hunter-Reay (Andretti Autosport)
- Third: (France) Simon Pagenaud (Schmidt Peterson Motorsports)

The 2014 GoPro Indy Grand Prix of Sonoma was a Verizon IndyCar Series event that was held on August 24, 2014 at Sonoma Raceway in Sonoma, California. It was the seventeenth and penultimate race of the 2014 IndyCar Series season. The eighty-five lap race was won by Scott Dixon for Chip Ganassi Racing, Ryan Hunter-Reay finished second and Simon Pagenaud third. A 6.0 earthquake hit the area in the early morning of the race; it did not damage the track, and officials deemed its infrastructure safe from collapse, allowing the race to proceed as scheduled.

The win was the 35th of Dixon's career, tying him with Bobby Unser for the fifth-most of all-time. Will Power maintained his lead in the series championship points standings after taking pole position in qualifying and scoring a ninth-place finish, building a 51-point advantage over his Team Penske teammate Hélio Castroneves.

As of the 2022 IndyCar Series, this was the last race of Mike Conway's IndyCar career. That season he was sharing a car with Ed Carpenter, who was doing the ovals. Carpenter would do the final race of the season at Fontana. After this, Conway would go off to the World Endurance Championship, where he would race for Toyota.

| Previous race: 2014 ABC Supply Wisconsin 250 | IndyCar Series; 2014 season | Next race: 2014 MAVTV 500 IndyCar World Championships |
| Previous race: 2013 GoPro Indy Grand Prix of Sonoma | GoPro Indy Grand Prix of Sonoma | Next race: 2015 GoPro Grand Prix of Sonoma |
