= List of Indycar Engine Manufacturer Championship winners =

The following is a list of the winners of the Engine Manufacturer Championship award in Open Wheel American Championship Car Racing. This award was first introduced during the 1979 CART Indy Car Series season.

The Engine Manufacturer Cup winners came under the following auspices:

- Championship Auto Racing Teams (1979-2007)
- Indy Racing League/IndyCar Series (1997–present)

== Winners ==
CART Manufacturers' Cup
Year	Manufacturer Champion
1979	Cosworth
1980	Cosworth (2)
1981	Cosworth (3)
1982	Cosworth (4)
1983	Cosworth (5)
1984	Cosworth (6)
1985	Cosworth (7)
1986	Cosworth (8)
1987	Cosworth (9)
1988	Chevrolet
1989	Chevrolet (2)
1990	Chevrolet (3)
1991	Chevrolet (4)
1992	Chevrolet (5)
1993	Chevrolet (6)
1994	Ilmor
1995	Ford
1996	Honda
1997	Mercedes-Benz
1998	Honda (2)
1999	Honda (3)
2000	Ford (2)
2001	Honda (4)
2002	Toyota
2003-2007	Not Awarded (Cosworth was only engine supplier)

== IndyCar Series Engine Manufacturer Championship ==
IndyCar Engine Manufacturer Championship
Year	Manufacturer Champion
1996–97	Oldsmobile
1998	Oldsmobile (2)
1999	Oldsmobile (3)
2000	Oldsmobile (4)
2001	Oldsmobile (5)
2002	Chevrolet
2003	Toyota
2004	Honda
2005	Honda (2)
2006-2011	Not Awarded (Honda was the only engine supplier)
2012	Chevrolet (2)
2013	Chevrolet (3)
2014	Chevrolet (4)
2015	Chevrolet (5)
2016	Chevrolet (6)
2017	Chevrolet (7)
2018	Honda (3)
2019	Honda (4)
2020	Honda (5)
2021	Honda (6)
2022	Chevrolet (8)
2023	Chevrolet (9)
2024	Chevrolet (10)
2025	Honda (7)
2026	Honda (8)
