= Rolling start =

Type of start in auto racing events

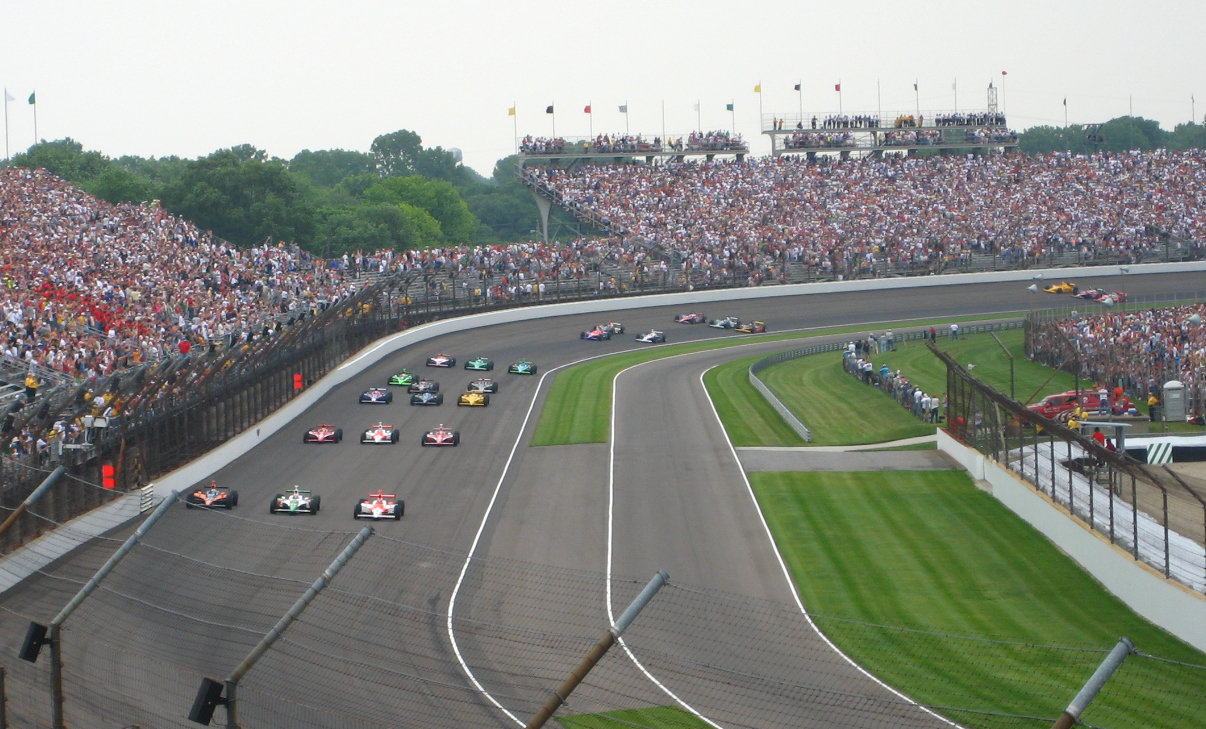
Cars in formation for a rolling start at the Indianapolis 500.

A rolling start is one of two modes of initiating or restarting an auto race; the other mode is the standing start. In a rolling start, the cars are ordered on the track and are led on a certain number of laps (parade or caution laps) at a predetermined safe speed by the safety car.

== Procedure ==
When race conditions are ready, the safety car will leave the track, and the race marshal will show the green flag, indicating that the field is allowed to accelerate. The safety car typically leaves the track some distance before the finish line, and a few seconds may elapse between the safety car's departure and the showing of the green flag. Cars must wait for the green flag to accelerate to race speeds. In the past, drivers would need to look for the flag, but in modern times this information is typically communicated to drivers via two-way radio, or at the proper acceleration zone, marked by a line or cone, determined at the pre-race drivers and mechanics briefing.

In international-level motorsport, races with rolling starts are typically started by the starter changing the starting lights from red to green after a specified number of green flag pace laps behind either a lead car or safety car. In this case the red lights are pre-illuminated part of the way around the final pace lap and are changed to green once the starter is happy with the composition of the field. International rolling starts may be aborted by leaving the red lights illuminated and the displaying of an "Extra Formation Lap" board and/or flashing yellow lights.

Rolling starts are often accompanied by several rules to prevent drivers from getting an unfair advantage during the start of the race. For example, drivers on the inside line cannot overtake cars on the outside until they have passed the start line. Drivers must stay behind the pace car and maintain their position within the field, unless entering the pits or given leave to go around. Furthermore, as the green flag nears and the pace car exits the track, drivers must maintain speed and position heading to the proper line. The lead driver cannot slow excessively to force trailing cars to bunch up, which would give the leader a jump on the restart.

Motorsports utilising a rolling start include stock car racing, sports car racing, and several worldwide touring car championships. Formula sports tend to avoid the rolling start for the initial start of the race, mostly because of the physics and technology behind the sport (for example, being too close to the car in front for too long can cause overheating and engine problems), but also because of the quicker acceleration times, and bigger dangers behind accidents within the sport.

The initial start of the race may organize the cars in specific lines. For instance, NASCAR races start double file, and the Indianapolis 500 starts triple file. Restarts, however, are often only single file, but lapped cars may form a second line on the inside. Some short track ovals have a rule, adopted by NASCAR in June 2009, and IndyCar during the 2011 season only, where the restarts are all double file, with the leader's choice of inside or outside on the ensuing restart.

Virtually all restarts in motorsports are held as rolling starts for time constraints; it is much quicker to get the cars to go on a rolling restart than a standing start (under the FIA Code, once a red flag is displayed, it takes ten minutes to restart a race via standing start). Formula One has a rule stating that in case of an excessively wet track, a rolling start may be used to start the race with the cars behind the safety car. In such cases, laps start counting immediately.

Some Formula One races — 2022 at Monaco, 1997, 2000, 2021, and 2025 at Spa, Belgium, 2003 at Interlagos, Brazil, 2007 at Fuji, Japan, 2008 at Monza, Italy, 2009 at Shanghai, China, 2010 at Yeongam, South Korea, 2011 at Montreal, Canada, 2014 at Suzuka, Japan, and 2016 in three races at Monaco, then Silverstone, Great Britain, and also Interlagos, Brazil — started with a rolling start because of weather concerns. They were not proper rolling starts because they started the race behind the safety car and so when racing properly started, they took the line in single file.

== See also ==
- Standing start
