= Companc =

Companc is a surname. Notable people with the surname include:

- Ezequiel Pérez Companc (born 1994), Argentine racing driver
- Gregorio Pérez Companc (born 1934), Argentina's wealthiest individual
- Luis Pérez Companc (born 1972), Argentine rally driver
- Pablo Pérez Companc (born 1982), Argentine racing driver
