= Pérez Companc =

Pérez Companc could refer to

- Gregorio Pérez Companc (born 1934), Argentine businessman
- Jorge Pérez Companc (born 1966), Argentine rally driver; see 2016 Dakar Rally
- Luis Pérez Companc (born 1972), Argentine rally and racing driver
- Pablo Pérez Companc (born 1982), Argentine racing driver
- Ezequiel Pérez Companc (born 1994), Argentine racing driver
