= Molinos Río de la Plata =

Argentine food company

Molinos Río de la Plata S.A.
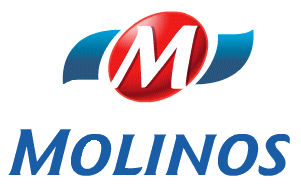
- Type: Sociedad Anónima
- Traded as: BCBA: MOLI
- Industry: Food Processing
- Founded: 1902
- Headquarters: Buenos Aires, Argentina
- Key people: Gregorio Pérez Companc, (Chairman); Juan Manuel Forn, (CEO).
- Products: Food
- Revenue: 547,117,081 United States dollar (2019)
- Operating income: 893,087 United States dollar (2019)
- Net income: −16,800,000 United States dollar (2019)
- Total assets: 436,341,125 United States dollar (2019)
- Number of employees: 5,000
- Parent: PC Holdings
- Website: www.molinos.com.ar

Molinos Río de la Plata (BCBA: MOLI) is Argentina's largest branded food products company. The company is a large exporter of sunflower processed oil and is one of Argentina's main exporters of bottled oil. Molinos also produces a wide range of packaged foods for domestic consumption, including bottled oil, margarine, pasta, pre-mixes, packaged flours, yerba mate, rice, cold cuts, and frozen foods.

== Overview ==
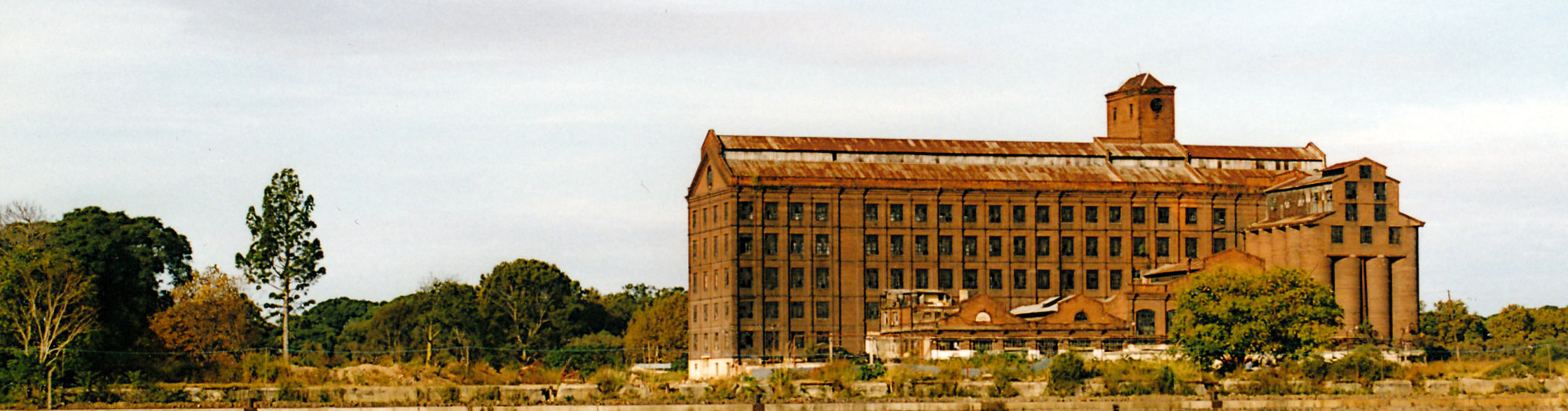
The former Molinos mill and silos in the Puerto Madero ward of Buenos Aires in 1999, later converted into the upscale Faena Hotel+Universe

Molinos Río de la Plata (commonly known as Molinos) traces its origins to the establishment of Centenera, a food-processing plant founded in 1899 by Bunge y Born, a wheat-milling company created by Belgian immigrants in 1884. In 1902, Bunge y Born built one of the largest wheat mills in Argentina on a site in Puerto Madero, Buenos Aires, and organized Molinos Río de la Plata, which would later become one of the country's principal food manufacturers and distributors.

In 1998, Bunge & Born divested most of its retail food interests as part of a broader corporate reorganization that led to the creation of Bunge Limited. Within that process, a controlling interest in Molinos was acquired by Gregorio Pérez Companc.

On 1 August 2002, the company announced the partial repurchase of its US$150 million senior secured export notes (SENs), scheduled to mature in 2006. Molinos repurchased notes with a face value of US$31.4 million at a discount of 25%, using available cash reserves. Following the transaction, the outstanding balance of the SENs was reduced to US$52.6 million.

According to the company, the repurchase lowered both its debt burden and debt-servicing costs. Nevertheless, the firm's financial position continued to be affected by the consequences of the Argentine economic crisis and the devaluation of the peso. On a pro forma basis as of 30 June 2002, consolidated financial debt totaled AR$718.8 million (approximately US$188 million), consisting primarily of the remaining US$52.6 million in SENs and US$84 million in working capital financing, most of which was denominated in U.S. dollars.

Molinos operates 20 manufacturing plants, 10 distribution centers and a fleet of approximately 600 trucks. The company also owns around 75,000 hectares (188,000 acres) of agricultural land in the Pampas, dedicated principally to wheat production.
