= 2007 Indy Pro Series =

American motorsport season

2007 Indy Pro Series season
- Indy Pro Series

Season
- Races: 16
- Start date: March 24
- End date: September 9

Awards
- Drivers' champion: (United Kingdom) Alex Lloyd
- Teams' champion: (United States) Sam Schmidt Motorsports
- Rookie of the Year: (Japan) Hideki Mutoh

Indy Pro Series Logo

The 2007 IRL Indy Pro Series was the sixth season of the developmental open-wheel racing series under the Indy Racing League ownership, and the 22nd in Indy NXT combined history, as officially recognized by IndyCar. All teams used Dallara IL-02 chassis, which was fitted with a new wing package, as well as unbranded TWR engines and Firestone tires.

In his second season in the series, Alex Lloyd became the runaway champion with Sam Schmidt Motorsports, clinching the title with two races remaining at Infineon Raceway in Sonoma. Lloyd won the first five races of the season, tying the late Greg Moore's start of the 1995 season for the all-time consecutive wins record in Indy Lights history. Aided by an expanded schedule, Lloyd won eight races including the Freedom 100, and became the third driver to reach that number after Paul Tracy's nine wins in 1990 and Moore's ten wins in 1995.

Japanese driver Hideki Mutoh, driving for the returning Panther Racing and backed by Honda through an association with Super Aguri, finished second in the standings despite missing the final round due to his IndyCar debut. He also won Rookie of the Year honors, with wins at the Indianapolis road course and Kentucky. Former champion Wade Cunningham finished third ahead of Bobby Wilson, with one win apiece, while Richard Antinucci scored two wins in a road course-only campaign for his uncle's team Cheever Racing.

Indy Pro Series teams and drivers competed for 3.7 million dollars, a 24 percent increase from 2006. This resulted in a sizeable influx of new or returning teams, led by Chip Ganassi Racing, Panther Racing and Rahal Letterman Racing, all of them also benefiting from a rule that gave extra test days to IndyCar teams competing in the Indy Pro Series. AFS Racing blended their efforts with Andretti Green Racing, while Rahal partnered with newcomers Andersen Racing. Other new teams were Team Moore Racing (a spin-off of Kenn Hardley Racing), Team KMA Racing, Mile High Racing and Apex Racing. Speedworks entered the series by buying the equipment of Dave McMillan Racing, while Playa Del Racing embarked on its own after fielding the Racing Professionals effort in 2006, and Part Sourcing International was renamed into SWE Racing after entering halfway through 2006.

The car counts increased dramatically as a result, with 25 entries for the Miami 100, a first for the series since 1998, and a record 24 drivers at the Freedom 100. At least 20 drivers were present at every round, a number not reached in any of the previous seven seasons, and thirteen drivers competed in every race. In total, 43 different drivers competed during the year, which is the all-time Indy NXT record as of 2024. The last race of the season featured the closest finish in motor racing history as claimed by IndyCar, when Logan Gomez beat Alex Lloyd to the line by just 0.0005 seconds.

== Drivers and teams ==
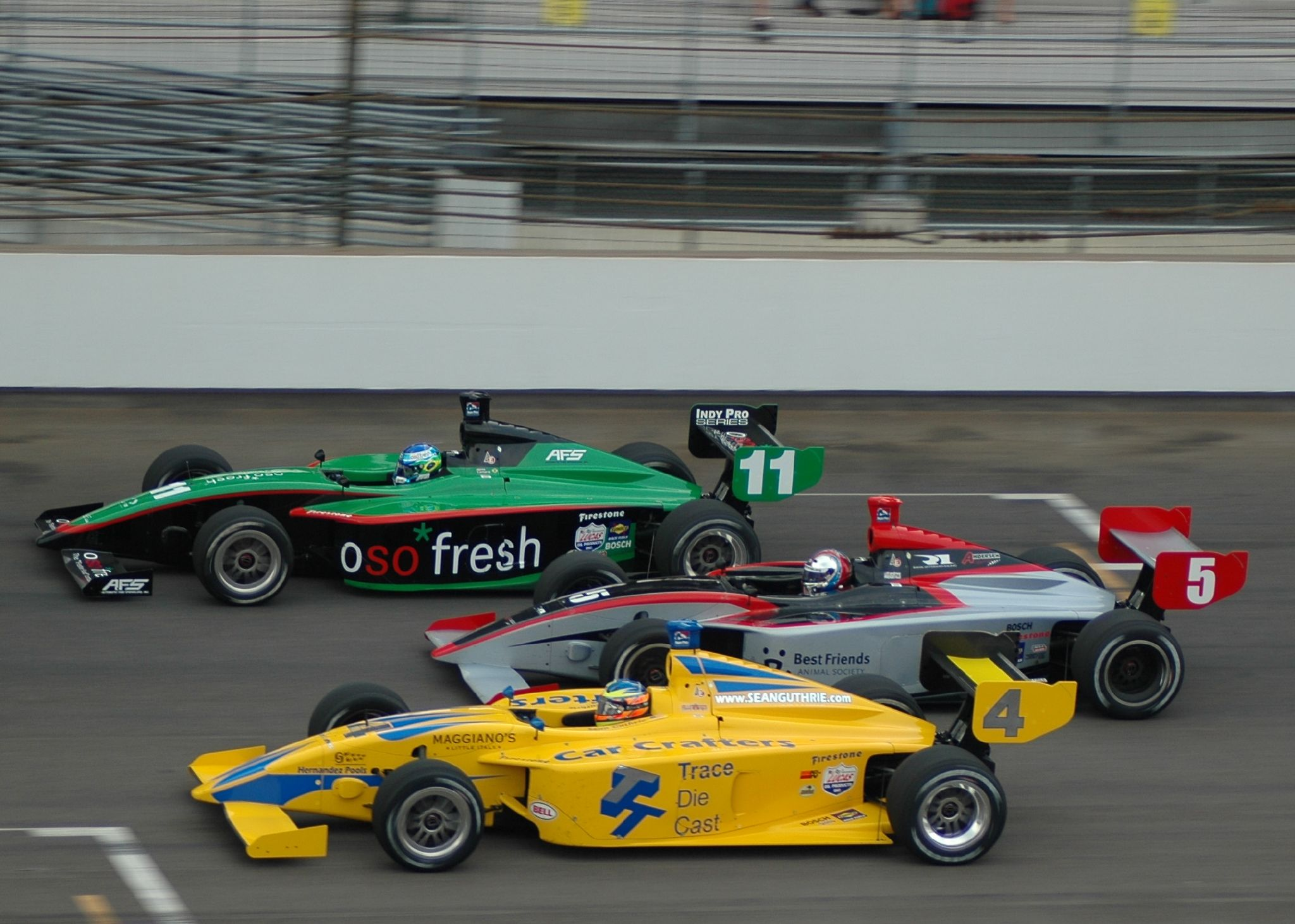
Jaime Camara, Sean Guthrie and Andrew Prendeville at the 2007 Freedom 100

Team	No.	Drivers	Rounds
(United States) Brian Stewart Racing	1	(United States) Bobby Wilson	All
(United States) Brian Stewart Racing	3	(United States) Brad Jaeger	All
(United States) Brian Stewart Racing	33	(Canada) Shane Jantzi	4
(United States) Team Moore Racing	2	(Canada) Tom Wood	1
(United States) Team Moore Racing	2	(United States) Jonathan Klein	2–12, 14–16
(United States) Team Moore Racing	2	(United States) Travis Gregg	13
(United States) Guthrie Racing	4	(United States) Sean Guthrie	1–11, 14–15
(United States) Guthrie Racing	4	(United States) Tom Wieringa	12–13, 16
(United States) Guthrie Racing	40	(United States) Tom Wieringa	1–8, 11
(United States) Guthrie Racing	40	(Netherlands) Arie Luyendyk Jr.	9–10
(United States) RLR Andersen Racing	5	(United States) Andrew Prendeville	All
(United States) RLR Andersen Racing	15	(Australia) Joey Scarallo	1–13
(United States) RLR Andersen Racing	15	(United States) J. R. Hildebrand	14–15
(United States) Michael Crawford Motorsports	6	(United States) C. R. Crews	1, 9–10, 12
(United States) Michael Crawford Motorsports	6	(United States) Matt Jaskol	2–3, 14–15
(United States) Michael Crawford Motorsports	6	(New Zealand) Marc Williams	4–8, 11
(United States) Michael Crawford Motorsports	6	(United States) Richard Heistand	9–10
(United States) Michael Crawford Motorsports	6	(United States) Ben Petter	16
(United States) Michael Crawford Motorsports	8	(United States) Shane Lewis	1
(United States) Michael Crawford Motorsports	8	(United States) C. R. Crews	2–3
(United States) Michael Crawford Motorsports	8	(United States) Matt Jaskol	4
(United States) Michael Crawford Motorsports	8	(United States) P. J. Abbott	5, 11, 16
(United States) Michael Crawford Motorsports	8	(United States) Doug Boyer	6–7, 9–10, 12
(United States) Michael Crawford Motorsports	8	(United States) Ben Petter	8
(United States) Michael Crawford Motorsports	8	(United States) Steve Ablondi	14–15
(United States) Sam Schmidt Motorsports	7	(United Kingdom) Alex Lloyd	All
(United States) Sam Schmidt Motorsports	23	(United States) Logan Gomez	All
(United States) Sam Schmidt Motorsports	38	(United States) Ryan Justice	1, 4–15
(United States) Sam Schmidt Motorsports	38	(United States) Travis Gregg	16
(United States) Sam Schmidt Motorsports	57	(United States) Leilani Munter	13, 16
(United States) Target Chip Ganassi Racing	9	(United States) Chris Festa	All
(United States) Target Chip Ganassi Racing	10	(Argentina) Pablo Pérez Companc	1
(United States) Andretti Green Racing/AFS	11	(Brazil) Jaime Camara	All
(United States) Andretti Green Racing/AFS	27	(New Zealand) Wade Cunningham	All
(United States) Playa Del Racing	12	(United States) A. J. Russell	1
(United States) Playa Del Racing	12	(United States) Phil Giebler	2–3, 6–7, 9–10, 14–15
(United States) Playa Del Racing	12	(United States) Al Unser III	4–5, 8, 11
(United States) Playa Del Racing	12	(United States) Sean Guthrie	12–13, 16
(United States) Team KMA Racing	13	(United States) Robbie Pecorari	All
(United States) Kenn Hardley Racing	24	(South Africa) Stephen Simpson	All
(United States) SWE Racing	34	(United States) Jon Brownson	1–10, 12–13, 16
(United States) SWE Racing	43	(United States) Jimmy Kite	16
(United States) SpeedWorks	44	(United Kingdom) Jay Howard	1–3
(United States) SpeedWorks	44	(United States) Daniel Herrington	6–7, 9–10, 12
(United States) SpeedWorks	44	(United States) Adam Andretti	16
(United States) Cheever Racing	51	(United States) Richard Antinucci	2–3, 6–7, 9–10, 12, 14–15
(United States) Apex Racing	52	(Canada) Ken Losch	All
(United States) Apex Racing	53	(United States) Mike Potekhen	All
(United States) Mile High Motorsports	54	(United States) Mickey Gilbert	1–4, 6–7, 14–15
(United States) Mile High Motorsports	54	(United States) Scott Mayer	9–10
(United States) Super Aguri Panther Racing	55	(Japan) Hideki Mutoh	1–15

== Schedule ==
The schedule expanded to a record 16 races for 2007, with the addition of two new venues and more double-headers. All racetracks from 2006 stayed on the schedule, as Indy Pro Series joined IndyCar at the newly constructed Iowa Speedway and the returning Mid-Ohio Sports Car Course, which had hosted the original Indy Lights series in its final 2001 season. The Liberty Challenge at Indianapolis was split into two shorter races, and the round at Watkins Glen was also converted to a double-header format, with Mid-Ohio being the only single-race road course.

Rd.	Date	Race name	Track	Location
1	March 24	Miami 100	O Homestead–Miami Speedway	Homestead, Florida
2	March 31 – April 1	Grand Prix of St. Petersburg	R Streets of St. Petersburg	St. Petersburg, Florida
3	March 31 – April 1	Grand Prix of St. Petersburg	R Streets of St. Petersburg	St. Petersburg, Florida
4	May 25	Freedom 100	O Indianapolis Motor Speedway	Speedway, Indiana
5	June 2	Milwaukee 100	O Milwaukee Mile	West Allis, Wisconsin
6	June 16–17	Liberty Challenge	R Indianapolis Motor Speedway road course	Speedway, Indiana
7	June 16–17	Liberty Challenge	R Indianapolis Motor Speedway road course	Speedway, Indiana
8	June 23	Iowa 100	O Iowa Speedway	Newton, Iowa
9	July 7–8	Corning 100	R Watkins Glen International	Watkins Glen, New York
10	July 7–8	Glen 100	R Watkins Glen International	Watkins Glen, New York
11	July 14	Sun Belt Rentals 100	O Nashville Superspeedway	Lebanon, Tennessee
12	July 22	Mid-Ohio 100	R Mid-Ohio Sports Car Course	Lexington, Ohio
13	August 11	Kentucky 100	O Kentucky Speedway	Sparta, Kentucky
14	August 25–26	Carneros 100	R Infineon Raceway	Sonoma, California
15	August 25–26	Valley of the Moon 100	R Infineon Raceway	Sonoma, California
16	September 9	Chicagoland 100	O Chicagoland Speedway	Joliet, Illinois

O Oval/Speedway
R Road/Street course

== Race results ==
Round	Race	Pole position	Fastest lap	Most laps led	Race Winner	
Round	Race	Pole position	Fastest lap	Most laps led	Driver	Team
1	Homestead–Miami Speedway	(United States) Chris Festa	(United States) Logan Gomez	(United Kingdom) Alex Lloyd	(United Kingdom) Alex Lloyd	Sam Schmidt Motorsports
2	Streets of St. Petersburg	(United Kingdom) Alex Lloyd	(Japan) Hideki Mutoh	(United Kingdom) Alex Lloyd	(United Kingdom) Alex Lloyd	Sam Schmidt Motorsports
3	Streets of St. Petersburg	(United States) Bobby Wilson (Note: No qualifying sessions were held for Race 2 of doubleheader weekends. The grid was decided by the results of Race 1, with the top 6 finishers in reverse order, and no bonus point was awarded for pole position.)	(United Kingdom) Alex Lloyd	(United States) Jonathan Klein	(United Kingdom) Alex Lloyd	Sam Schmidt Motorsports
4	Indianapolis Motor Speedway	(Canada) Ken Losch	(United States) Andrew Prendeville	(United Kingdom) Alex Lloyd	(United Kingdom) Alex Lloyd	Sam Schmidt Motorsports
5	Milwaukee Mile	(United Kingdom) Alex Lloyd	(United Kingdom) Alex Lloyd	(United Kingdom) Alex Lloyd	(United Kingdom) Alex Lloyd	Sam Schmidt Motorsports
6	Indianapolis Motor Speedway Road Course	(Japan) Hideki Mutoh	(Japan) Hideki Mutoh	(Japan) Hideki Mutoh	(Japan) Hideki Mutoh	Super Aguri Panther Racing
7	Indianapolis Motor Speedway Road Course	(United States) Ryan Justice (Note: No qualifying sessions were held for Race 2 of doubleheader weekends. The grid was decided by the results of Race 1, with the top 8 finishers in reverse order, and no bonus point was awarded for pole position.)	(United States) Bobby Wilson	(United States) Bobby Wilson	(United States) Bobby Wilson	Brian Stewart Racing
8	Iowa Speedway	(New Zealand) Wade Cunningham	(United Kingdom) Alex Lloyd	(New Zealand) Wade Cunningham	(United Kingdom) Alex Lloyd	Sam Schmidt Motorsports
9	Watkins Glen International	(New Zealand) Wade Cunningham	(United Kingdom) Alex Lloyd	(New Zealand) Wade Cunningham	(New Zealand) Wade Cunningham	Andretti Green Racing/AFS
10	Watkins Glen International	(United States) Daniel Herrington	(United Kingdom) Alex Lloyd	(United Kingdom) Alex Lloyd	(United Kingdom) Alex Lloyd	Sam Schmidt Motorsports
11	Nashville Superspeedway	(United Kingdom) Alex Lloyd	(United States) Robbie Pecorari	(United Kingdom) Alex Lloyd	(United States) Robbie Pecorari	Team KMA Racing
12	Mid-Ohio Sports Car Course	(United Kingdom) Alex Lloyd	(United States) Richard Antinucci	(United States) Richard Antinucci	(United States) Richard Antinucci	Cheever Racing
13	Kentucky Speedway	(Japan) Hideki Mutoh	(United Kingdom) Alex Lloyd	(Japan) Hideki Mutoh	(Japan) Hideki Mutoh	Super Aguri Panther Racing
14	Infineon Raceway	(United States) Richard Antinucci	(Japan) Hideki Mutoh	(United Kingdom) Alex Lloyd	(United Kingdom) Alex Lloyd	Sam Schmidt Motorsports
15	Infineon Raceway	(United States) Ryan Justice	(United States) Richard Antinucci	(United States) Ryan Justice	(United States) Richard Antinucci	Cheever Racing
16	Chicagoland Speedway	(United Kingdom) Alex Lloyd	(United States) Travis Gregg	(United Kingdom) Alex Lloyd	(United States) Logan Gomez	Sam Schmidt Motorsports

== Race summaries ==
=== Round 1 of 16: Miami 100 ===
- Saturday March 24, 2007
- Homestead-Miami Speedway, Homestead, Florida
- Race weather: 78 °F (26 °C), fair skies
- Pole position winner: #9 Chris Festa 28.5455 sec 187.280 mph (301.398 km/h)
- Race Summary: The race which saw a Pro Series record 25 entries was marred by two major incidents. The first occurred when Wade Cunningham lost control of his car. Ryan Justice made contact with a large piece of debris from Cunningham's car and made hard contact with the wall at the exit of turn 2. He was unconscious as he was removed from the car but regained consciousness on the way to the infield care center. The next incident came just two laps after the end of the lengthy caution following the first incident. Sean Guthrie and Pablo Pérez Companc made contact between turns one and two and Perez's car launched over Guthrie's and into the catch fence. Perez was transported to the hospital with leg injuries. The race was prematurely ended after 57 laps due to damage to the catch fence from the second incident with Alex Lloyd leading and gaining his first IPS victory on an oval.

Top Five Finishers
Fin. Pos	St. Pos	Car No.	Driver	Team	Laps	Time	Laps Led	Points
1	2	7	(United Kingdom) Alex Lloyd	Sam Schmidt Motorsports	57	0:57:45.9637	27	52
2	1	9	(United States) Chris Festa	Chip Ganassi Racing	57	+0.7971	22	41
3	3	55	(Japan) Hideki Mutoh	Super Aguri Panther Racing	57	+2.0759	0	35
4	24	11	(Brazil) Jaime Camara	Andretti Green Racing	57	+2.9581	0	32
5	21	5	(United States) Andrew Prendeville	RLR Andersen Racing	57	+5.6602	0	30
Race average speed: 87.918 mph (141.490 km/h)
Lead changes: 5 between 3 drivers
Cautions: 3 for 36 laps

=== Round 2 of 16: St. Petersburg Grand Prix 1 ===
- Saturday March 31, 2007
- Streets of St. Petersburg, St. Petersburg, Florida
- Race weather: 80 °F (27 °C), mostly sunny
- Pole position winner: #7 Alex Lloyd 1:07.1404 sec 96.514 mph (155.324 km/h)
- Race Summary: Alex Lloyd dominated the first race at St. Petersburg leading all 40 laps of the race and winning from pole position. Lloyd held off Super Aguri Panther Racing's Hideki Mutoh for the final 22 laps. Mutoh had the best chance to take the win away from Lloyd but it just was not meant to be. Lloyd now has 3 wins in a row dating back to the final race of 2006.

Top Five Finishers
Fin. Pos	St. Pos	Car No.	Driver	Team	Laps	Time	Laps Led	Points
1	1	7	(United Kingdom) Alex Lloyd	Sam Schmidt Motorsports	40	0:56:59.2967	40	53
2	4	55	(Japan) Hideki Mutoh	Super Aguri Panther Racing	40	+1.6038	0	40
3	7	2	(United States) Jonathan Klein	Team Moore Racing	40	+8.3402	0	35
4	5	24	(South Africa) Stephen Simpson	Kenn Hardley Racing	40	+9.3671	0	32
5	3	44	(United Kingdom) Jay Howard	SpeedWorks	40	+16.1795	0	30
Race average speed: 75.805 mph (121.996 km/h)
Lead changes: 0 between 1 driver
Cautions: 3 for 14 laps

=== Round 3 of 16: St. Petersburg Grand Prix 2 ===
- Saturday April 1, 2007
- Streets of St. Petersburg, St. Petersburg, Florida
- Race weather: 79 °F (26 °C), sunny
- Pole position winner: Bobby Wilson Top 6 finishers from Race 1 inverted
- Race Summary: Alex Lloyd had the car to beat in St. Petersburg, winning both races of the double-header. Lloydhad to start race 2 from 6th place because of the inverted field after race 1, but that didn't stop him from getting to the front. On lap 21 of 40 Lloyd took the lead and was never to lose it, winning now the first 3 races of 2007.

Top Five Finishers
Fin. Pos	St. Pos	Car No.	Driver	Team	Laps	Time	Laps Led	Points
1	6	7	(United Kingdom) Alex Lloyd	Sam Schmidt Motorsports	40	0:58:35.8707	19	50
2	9	27	(New Zealand) Wade Cunningham	Andretti Green Racing/AFS	40	+0.2542	0	40
3	1	1	(United States) Bobby Wilson	Brian Stewart Racing	40	+0.3308	1	35
4	5	55	(Japan) Hideki Mutoh	Super Aguri Panther Racing	40	+1.6818	0	32
5	7	13	(United States) Robbie Pecorari	Team KMA Racing	40	+2.7977	0	30
Race average speed: 73.723 mph (118.646 km/h)
Lead changes: 2 between 3 drivers
Cautions: 5 for 18 laps

=== Round 4 of 16: Freedom 100 ===
- Friday May 25, 2007
- Indianapolis Motor Speedway, Indianapolis, Indiana
- Race weather: 82 °F (28 °C), cloudy with scattered showers
- Pole position winner: #52 Ken Losch 188.231 mph (302.928 km/h)
- Race Summary:

Top Five Finishers
Fin. Pos	St. Pos	Car No.	Driver	Team	Laps	Time	Laps Led	Points
1	2	7	(United Kingdom) Alex Lloyd	Sam Schmidt Motorsports	40	0:46:39.6029	40	50
2	7	9	(United States) Chris Festa	Chip Ganassi Racing	40	+0.4131	0	40
3	18	11	(Brazil) Jaime Camara	AFS/Andretti Green	40	+1.2815	0	35
4	10	5	(United States) Andrew Prendeville	RLR Andersen Racing	40	+1.7873	0	32
5	4	55	(Japan) Hideki Mutoh	Super Aguri Panther	40	+2.5715	0	30
Race average speed: 128.590 mph (206.946 km/h)
Lead changes: 0 between 0 drivers
Cautions: 4 for 16 laps

=== Round 5 of 16: Road Runner 100 ===
- Saturday June 2, 2007
- Milwaukee Mile, West Allis, Wisconsin
- Race weather: 76 °F (24 °C), partly cloudy
- Pole position winner: #7 Alex Lloyd 146.077 mph (235.088 km/h)
- Race Summary: On turn 2 of the first lap Hideki Mutoh spun in front of most of the field, collecting 5 cars including Jaime Camara and Chris Festa. Jon Brownson shortly after the restart on lap 11. On lap 17 the race restarted and ran green until lap 81, during which time leader Alex Lloyd was able to pull out a 4-second lead on his closest pursuer Mike Potekhen and lap all but 3 of his competitors, cruising to his 5th straight victory to start the season. Lloyd now held the league record for consecutive wins and sat second on the series' all-time wins list.

Top Five Finishers
Fin. Pos	St. Pos	Car No.	Driver	Team	Laps	Time	Laps Led	Points
1	1	7	(United Kingdom) Alex Lloyd	Sam Schmidt Motorsports	100	0:55:55.5643	100	50
2	4	53	(United States) Mike Potekhen	Apex Racing	100	+2.2826	0	40
3	2	2	(United States) Jonathan Klein	Team Moore Racing	100	+2.4395	0	35
4	9	4	(United States) Sean Guthrie	U.S. Pro Racing	100	+14.0423	0	32
5	17	1	(United States) Bobby Wilson	Brian Stewart Racing	99	+1 lap	0	30
Race average speed: 108.894 mph (175.248 km/h)
Lead changes: 0 between 0 drivers
Cautions: 3 for 22 laps

=== Round 6 of 16: Liberty Challenge Race 1 ===
- Saturday June 16, 2007
- Indianapolis Motor Speedway, Speedway, Indiana
- Race weather: 95 °F (35 °C), Hazy
- Pole position winner: #55 Hideki Mutoh 109.966 mph (176.973 km/h)
- Race Summary:

Top Five Finishers
Fin. Pos	St. Pos	Car No.	Driver	Team	Laps	Time	Laps Led	Points
1	1	55	(Japan) Hideki Mutoh	Super Aguri Panther	18	0:26:09.8910	18	53
2	2	7	(United Kingdom) Alex Lloyd	Sam Schmidt Motorsports	18	+6.2730	0	40
3	5	11	(Brazil) Jaime Camara	Andretti Green/AFS Racing	18	+10.9900	0	35
4	8	27	(New Zealand) Wade Cunningham	AFS Racing	18	+12.8240	0	32
5	6	24	(South Africa) Stephen Simpson	Kenn Hardley Racing	18	+13.2260	0	30
Race average speed: 107.320 mph (172.715 km/h)
Lead changes: 0 between 0 drivers
Cautions: 0 for 0 laps

=== Round 7 of 16: Liberty Challenge Race 2 ===
- Saturday June 17, 2007
- Indianapolis Motor Speedway, Speedway, Indiana
- Race weather: 82 °F (28 °C), Hazy
- Pole position winner: #38 Ryan Justice (8th place in race 1)
- Race Summary:

Top Five Finishers
Fin. Pos	St. Pos	Car No.	Driver	Team	Laps	Time	Laps Led	Points
1	2	1	(United States) Bobby Wilson	Brian Stewart Racing	18	0:28:40.9170	18	52
2	7	7	(United Kingdom) Alex Lloyd	Sam Schmidt Motorsports	18	+10.5260	0	40
3	8	55	(Japan) Hideki Mutoh	Super Aguri Panther	18	+13.1470	0	35
4	1	38	(United States) Ryan Justice	Sam Schmidt Motorsports	18	+13.1500	0	33
5	6	11	(Brazil) Jaime Camara	Andretti Green/AFS Racing	18	+13.6130	0	30
Race average speed: 97.901 mph (157.556 km/h)
Lead changes: 0 between 0 drivers
Cautions: 1 for 3 laps

=== Round 8 of 16: Iowa 100 ===
- Saturday June 23, 2007
- Iowa Speedway, Newton, Iowa
- Race weather: 68 °F (20 °C), overcast, humid
- Pole position winner: #27 Wade Cunningham 19.9522 sec 161.306 mph (259.597 km/h)
- Race Summary: Wade Cunningham started from the pole and led the first 105 of the 115 laps, but was passed on the bottom by Alex Lloyd, who pulled away to capture his sixth victory of the season. On lap 79, Sean Guthrie lost control on the front straight while running fourth and lapping Mike Potekhen and shot across the infield and slammed into the inside wall. He walked away from the incident on his own power, but underwent X-Rays and was diagnosed with a displaced fracture of his left foot. Lloyd now had more Pro Series wins than any other driver.

Top Five Finishers
Fin. Pos	St. Pos	Car No.	Driver	Team	Laps	Time	Laps Led	Points
1	2	7	(United Kingdom) Alex Lloyd	Sam Schmidt Motorsports	115	0:53:18.7234	10	50
2	1	27	(New Zealand) Wade Cunningham	AFS Racing	115	+0.3927	105	43
3	8	55	(Japan) Hideki Mutoh	Super Aguri Panther	115	+2.0990	0	35
4	12	38	(United States) Ryan Justice	Sam Schmidt Motorsports	115	+3.4352	0	32
5	13	13	(United States) Robbie Pecorari	Team KMA Racing	115	+6.0188	0	30
Race average speed: 115.707 mph (186.212 km/h)
Lead changes: 1 between 2 drivers
Cautions: 4 for 32 laps

=== Round 9 of 16: Corning Twin 100's Race 1 ===
- Saturday July 7, 2007
- Watkins Glen International, Watkins Glen, New York
- Race weather:
- Pole position winner: #27 Wade Cunningham 1 min 36.7418 sec 125.406 mph (201.821 km/h)
- Race Summary: Polesitter Wade Cunningham held off a hard-charging Hideki Mutoh to capture his first win of the season and fifth of his career. The only major incident of the race came on lap 8 when Chris Festa spun coming out of turn 1 and hit the inside guard rail.

Top Five Finishers
Fin. Pos	St. Pos	Car No.	Driver	Team	Laps	Time	Laps Led	Points
1	1	27	(New Zealand) Wade Cunningham	AFS Racing	29	0:55:19.2394	29	53
2	4	55	(Japan) Hideki Mutoh	Super Aguri Panther	29	+0.0758	0	40
3	2	7	(United Kingdom) Alex Lloyd	Sam Schmidt Motorsports	29	+3.2013	0	35
4	5	12	(United States) Phil Giebler	Playa Del Racing	29	+10.5847	0	32
5	10	1	(United States) Bobby Wilson	Brian Stewart Racing	29	+10.7416	0	30
Race average speed: 105.997 mph (170.586 km/h)
Lead changes: none
Cautions: 2 for 5 laps

=== Round 10 of 16: Corning Twin 100's Race 2 ===
- Sunday July 8, 2007
- Watkins Glen International, Watkins Glen, New York
- Race weather:
- Pole position winner: #44 Daniel Herrington (6th place in race 1)
- Race Summary: On lap 3, Alex Lloyd was able to get by polesitter Daniel Herrington and pull away from his closest pursuer, race 1 winner Wade Cunningham, to capture his seventh win of the season and further extend his points lead.

Top Five Finishers
Fin. Pos	St. Pos	Car No.	Driver	Team	Laps	Time	Laps Led	Points
1	4	7	(United Kingdom) Alex Lloyd	Sam Schmidt Motorsports	29	0:52:28.2245	26	52
2	6	27	(New Zealand) Wade Cunningham	AGR-AFS Racing	29	+4.7194	0	40
3	1	44	(United States) Daniel Herrington	SpeedWorks	29	+16.3398	3	35
4	3	12	(United States) Phil Giebler	Playa Del Racing	29	+23.8961	0	32
5	8	51	(United States) Richard Antinucci	Cheever Racing	29	+26.2453	0	30
Race average speed: 111.754 mph (179.851 km/h)
Lead changes: 1 between 2 drivers
Cautions: 1 for 3 laps

=== Round 11 of 16: Sun Belt Rentals 100 ===
- Saturday July 14, 2007
- Nashville Superspeedway, Lebanon, Tennessee
- Race weather: 90 °F (32 °C), Sunny
- Pole position winner: #7 Alex Lloyd 25.7368 sec 181.841 mph (292.645 km/h)
- Race Summary:

Top Five Finishers
Fin. Pos	St. Pos	Car No.	Driver	Team	Laps	Time	Laps Led	Points
1	3	13	(United States) Robbie Pecorari	Team KMA Racing	77	0:52:56.3282	22	50
2	9	23	(United States) Logan Gomez	Sam Schmidt Motorsports	77	+0.2226	0	40
3	8	11	(Brazil) Jaime Camara	AGR-AFS Racing	77	+1.3941	0	35
4	2	27	(New Zealand) Wade Cunningham	AGR-AFS Racing	77	+2.0087	1	32
5	11	2	(United States) Jonathan Klein	Team Moore Racing	77	+2.2211	0	30
Race average speed: 113.452 mph (182.583 km/h)
Lead changes: 5 between 3 drivers
Cautions: 3 for 25 laps

=== Round 12 of 16: Mid Ohio 100 ===
- Saturday July 21, 2007
- Mid-Ohio Sports Car Course, Lexington, Ohio
- Race weather: 70 °F (21 °C), Partly Cloudy
- Pole position winner: #7 Alex Lloyd 110.188 mph (177.330 km/h)
- Race Summary:

Top Five Finishers
Fin. Pos	St. Pos	Car No.	Driver	Team	Laps	Time	Laps Led	Points
1	4	51	(United States) Richard Antinucci	Cheever Racing	40	0:51:40.7399	25	52
2	6	27	(New Zealand) Wade Cunningham	AGR-AFS Racing	40	+0.9588	0	40
3	2	24	(South Africa) Stephen Simpson	Kenn Hardley Racing	40	+9.1590	0	35
4	3	5	(United States) Andrew Prendeville	RLR/Andersen Racing	40	+10.5676	0	32
5	9	55	(Japan) Hideki Mutoh	Super Aguri Panther	40	+11.4918	0	30
Race average speed: 104.863 mph (168.761 km/h)
Lead changes: 1 between 2 drivers
Cautions: 1 for 2 laps

=== Round 13 of 16: Kentucky 100 ===
- Saturday August 11, 2007
- Kentucky Speedway, Sparta, Kentucky
- Race weather:
- Pole position winner: #55 Hideki Mutoh 191.276 mph (307.829 km/h)
- Race Summary:

Top Five Finishers
Fin. Pos	St. Pos	Car No.	Driver	Team	Laps	Time	Laps Led	Points
1	1	55	(Japan) Hideki Mutoh	Super Aguri Panther	67	0:54:01.6259	66	53
2	2	7	(United Kingdom) Alex Lloyd	Sam Schmidt Motorsports	67	+0.1032	0	40
3	3	27	(New Zealand) Wade Cunningham	AGR-AFS Racing	67	+0.1567	1	35
4	6	9	(United States) Chris Festa	Chip Ganassi Racing	67	+0.4246	0	32
5	20	11	(Brazil) Jaime Camara	AGR-AFS Racing	67	+0.5673	0	30
Race average speed: 110.123 mph (177.226 km/h)
Lead changes: 2 between 2 drivers
Cautions: 2 for 32 laps

=== Round 14 of 16: Carneros 100 ===
- Saturday August 25, 2007
- Infineon Raceway, Sonoma, California
- Race weather: 85 °F (29 °C), sunny
- Pole position winner: #51 Richard Antinucci 1:22.2742 100.639 mph (161.963 km/h)
- Race Summary: Alex Lloyd passed Richard Antinucci on the first lap and never looked back, leading all 30 laps en route to the victory while clinching the championship.

Top Five Finishers
Fin. Pos	St. Pos	Car No.	Driver	Team	Laps	Time	Laps Led	Points
1	2	7	(United Kingdom) Alex Lloyd	Sam Schmidt Motorsports	30	0:45:28.8873	30	53
2	1	51	(United States) Richard Antinucci	Cheever Racing	30	+0.8927	0	40
3	4	53	(United States) Mike Potekhen	Apex Racing	30	+5.6988	0	35
4	3	24	(South Africa) Stephen Simpson	Kenn Hardley Racing	30	+6.5361	0	32
5	7	11	(Brazil) Jaime Camara	AGR-AFS Racing	30	+13.7964	0	30
Race average speed: 91.026 mph (146.492 km/h)
Lead changes: 0
Cautions: 2 for 4 laps

=== Round 15 of 16: Valley of the Moon 100 ===
- Sunday August 26, 2007
- Infineon Raceway, Sonoma, California
- Race weather: 71 °F (22 °C), mostly sunny
- Pole position winner: #38 Ryan Justice (8th place in Race 1)
- Race Summary: The first eight positions from the first race were inverted to determine the grid for race 2. Alex Lloyd's car had engine trouble on the pace lap and he failed to start the race. Richard Antinucci steadily climbed through the field from the seventh starting position, eventually finding his way past polesitter Ryan Justice on lap 18 to take the lead and capture his second win of the season.

Top Five Finishers
Fin. Pos	St. Pos	Car No.	Driver	Team	Laps	Time	Laps Led	Points
1	7	51	(United States) Richard Antinucci	Cheever Racing	30	0:42:20.0000	12	50
2	1	38	(United States) Ryan Justice	Sam Schmidt Motorsports	30	+1.7400	18	43
3	2	5	(United States) Andrew Prendeville	RLR-Andersen Racing	30	+2.2703	0	35
4	3	23	(United States) Logan Gomez	Sam Schmidt Motorsports	30	+6.9949	0	32
5	5	24	(South Africa) Stephen Simpson	Kenn Hardley Racing	30	+7.5331	0	30
Race average speed: 97.770 mph (157.346 km/h)
Lead changes: 1 between 2 drivers
Cautions: 0 for 0 laps

=== Round 16 of 16: Chicagoland 100 ===
- Sunday September 9, 2007
- Chicagoland Speedway, Joliet, Illinois
- Race weather: 75 °F (24 °C), sunny
- Pole position winner: #7 Alex Lloyd 28.7799 sec 190.133 mph (305.989 km/h)
- Race Summary: The Sam Schmidt Motorsports cars of champion Alex Lloyd and Logan Gomez battled for the lead with Robbie Pecorari throughout the race, which was slowed by two extended caution flags, the first caused by a major crash involving Chris Festa and Jaime Camara and the second involving Travis Gregg and Wade Cunningham. Gomez led his teammate entering the final lap. Lloyd mounted a challenge and the two cars briefly touched exiting turn four and Gomez was able to hold off Lloyd for his first Pro Series victory by a mere 0.0005 sec. The league claimed that this finish was the closest in motor racing history.

Top Five Finishers
Fin. Pos	St. Pos	Car No.	Driver	Team	Laps	Time	Laps Led	Points
1	4	23	(United States) Logan Gomez	Sam Schmidt Motorsports	67	0:56:10.8201	22	50
2	1	7	(United Kingdom) Alex Lloyd	Sam Schmidt Motorsports	67	+0.0005	38	43
3	7	13	(United States) Robbie Pecorari	Team KMA Motorsports	67	+1.2821	0	35
4	11	1	(United States) Bobby Wilson	Brian Stewart Racing	67	+1.3000	0	32
5	16	53	(United States) Mike Potekhen	Apex Racing	67	+1.3824	0	30
Race average speed: 108.764 mph (175.039 km/h)
Lead changes: 9 between 4 drivers
Cautions: 5 for 33 laps

== Championship standings ==
=== Drivers' Championship ===
Scoring system

Position	**1st**	**2nd**	**3rd**	**4th**	**5th**	**6th**	**7th**	**8th**	**9th**	**10th**	**11th**	**12th**	**13th**	**14th**	**15th**	**16th**	**17th**	**18th**	**19th**	**20th**	**21st**	**22nd**	**23rd**	**24th**	**25th**
Points	50	40	35	32	30	28	26	24	22	20	19	18	17	16	15	14	13	12	11	10	9	8	7	6	5

- The driver who starts on pole is awarded one point (except for Race 2 of doubleheader weekends)
- The driver who leads the most laps in a race is awarded two additional points.

Pos	Driver	HMS	STP		INDY	MIL	IMS		IOW	WGL		NAS	MOH	KTY	SNM		CHI	Points
1	(United Kingdom) Alex Lloyd	1*	**1***	1	1*	**1***	2	2	1	3	1*	**11***	**22**	2	1*	DNS	**2***	652
2	(Japan) Hideki Mutoh RY	3	2	4	5	19	**1***	3	3	2	6	6	5	**1***	19	10		481
3	(New Zealand) Wade Cunningham	24	9	2	23	12	4	21	**2***	**1***	2	4	2	3	16	11	17	423
4	(United States) Bobby Wilson	6	6	**3^{i}**	22	5	7	1*	9	5	12	15	6	18	17	14	4	393
5	(United States) Mike Potekhen	7	11	22	6	2	10	8	12	9	7	19	9	7	3	8	5	379
6	(Brazil) Jaime Camara	4	23	8	3	17	3	5	21	7	10	3	8	5	5	17	20	373
7	(United States) Logan Gomez R	16	14	18	12	18	9	6	6	14	15	2	10	13	6	4	1	368
8	(United States) Robbie Pecorari R	8	7	5	11	14	24	19	5	22	11	1	7	8	18	22	3	344
9	(South Africa) Stephen Simpson R	11	4	20	14	22	5	11	19	12	13	7	3	11	4	5	12	340
10	(United States) Chris Festa	**2**	8	12	2	21	11	14	16	21	17	9	13	4	13	19	19	313
11	(United States) Andrew Prendeville R	5	13	17	4	20	21	20	14	10	8	20	4	17	7	3	21	306
12	(United States) Jonathan Klein		3	14*	10	3	19	7	18	11	9	5	19		9	6	15	304
13	(United States) Ryan Justice R	25			13	6	8	**4^{i}**	4	23	23	8	11	15	8	**2*^{i}**		276
14	(United States) Sean Guthrie	19	16	23	19	4	13	12	20	15	16	14	12	6	12	13	6	274
15	(United States) Richard Antinucci R		19	15			6	9		8	5		1*		**2**	1		273
16	(United States) Brad Jaeger R	13	12	19	21	10	16	22	17	13	14	12	14	9	10	9	11	260
17	(Canada) Ken Losch R	14	22	10	**24**	13	17	16	11	19	19	10	17	12	15	15	9	239
18	(Australia) Joey Scarallo R	21	15	9	20	8	18	13	13	16	20	18	18	20				184
19	(United States) Jon Brownson R	15	17	16	9	11	23	17	22	20	24		21	19			8	171
20	(United States) Phil Giebler		24	7			12	15		4	4				14	12		163
21	(United States) Tom Wieringa R	12	20	21	16	16	25	18	15			21	23	14			DNS	137
22	(United States) C. R. Crews R	9	10	6						18	18		15					109
23	(United States) Daniel Herrington R						22	10		6	**3^{i}**		20					101
24	(United States) Matt Jaskol R		18	13	7										11	7		100
25	(United States) Mickey Gilbert R	22	21	11	15		15	24							21	16		95
26	(United States) Al Unser III				8	7			7			13						93
27	(New Zealand) Marc Williams R				17	9	20	25	8			16						88
28	(United Kingdom) Jay Howard	10	5	24														56
29	(United States) P. J. Abbott					15						17					7	54
30	(United States) Doug Boyer R						14	23		DNS	21		16					52
31	(United States) Ben Petter R								10								14	36
32	(United States) Travis Gregg													10			16	34
33	(United States) Leilani Münter R													16			13	31
34	(United States) Steve Ablondi R														20	18		22
35	(Netherlands) Arie Luyendyk Jr.									17	22							21
36	(United States) Jimmy Kite R																10	20
37	(United States) J. R. Hildebrand R														22	20		18
38	(Canada) Tom Wood	17																13
39	(Argentina) Pablo Pérez Companc R	18																12
40	(Canada) Shane Jantzi R				18													12
41	(United States) Adam Andretti R																18	12
42	(United States) Shane Lewis R	20																10
43	(United States) A. J. Russell R	23																7
	(United States) Scott Mayer									Wth								
	(United States) Richard Heistand									Wth								
Pos	Driver	HMS	STP		INDY	MIL	IMS		IOW	WGL		NAS	MOH	KTY	SNM		CHI	Points

Color	Result
Gold	Winner
Silver	2nd place
Bronze	3rd place
Green	4th & 5th place
Light Blue	6th–10th place
Dark Blue	Finished (Outside Top 10)
Purple	Did not finish
Red	Did not qualify (DNQ)
Brown	Withdrawn (Wth)
Black	Disqualified (DSQ)
White	Did not start (DNS)
Blank	Did not participate (DNP)
Blank	Not competing

**In-line notation**
**Bold**	Pole position (1 point)
Italics	Ran fastest race lap
*	Led most race laps (2 points)
^{i}	Partially inverted field no bonus point awarded
Rookie of the Year
Rookie

- Ties in points broken by number of wins, or best finishes.
