= Mike Potekhen =

American racing driver

Michael Potekhen
- Nationality: American
- Born: August 15, 1979 (age 47) Silverthorne, Colorado, U.S.

Indy Lights
- Years active: 2006-2009
- Teams: Apex Racing; SWE Racing; Alliance Motorsports
- Starts: 34
- Wins: 0
- Poles: 0
- Best finish: 5th in 2007

Previous series
- 1997 2001 2003 2004-2006: Formula Vauxhall Pro; U.S. F2000; Star Mazda Series; Formula Mazda

Michael Potekhen (born August 15, 1979) is an American racing driver from Silverthorne, Colorado who competed in the Firestone Indy Lights Series.

After starting in karts, Potekhen began racing in the Star Mazda West Series and Formula Vauxhall Winter Series in 1997. He competed in Star Mazda West until 2001 when he moved to U.S. Formula Ford 2000.

In 2003, Potekhen made his professional debut and finished fifth in the Star Mazda Pro Series. He competed in the Formula Mazda pro series from 2004 to 2006 and in May 2006 he made his Indy Pro Series debut at the Freedom 100 where he started and finished 11th. Potekhen made four other IPS starts that year. In 2007, he competed in a full season of the Indy Pro Series and achieved an IPS career-best finish of second at the Milwaukee Mile and finished in a surprising fifth place in the championship.

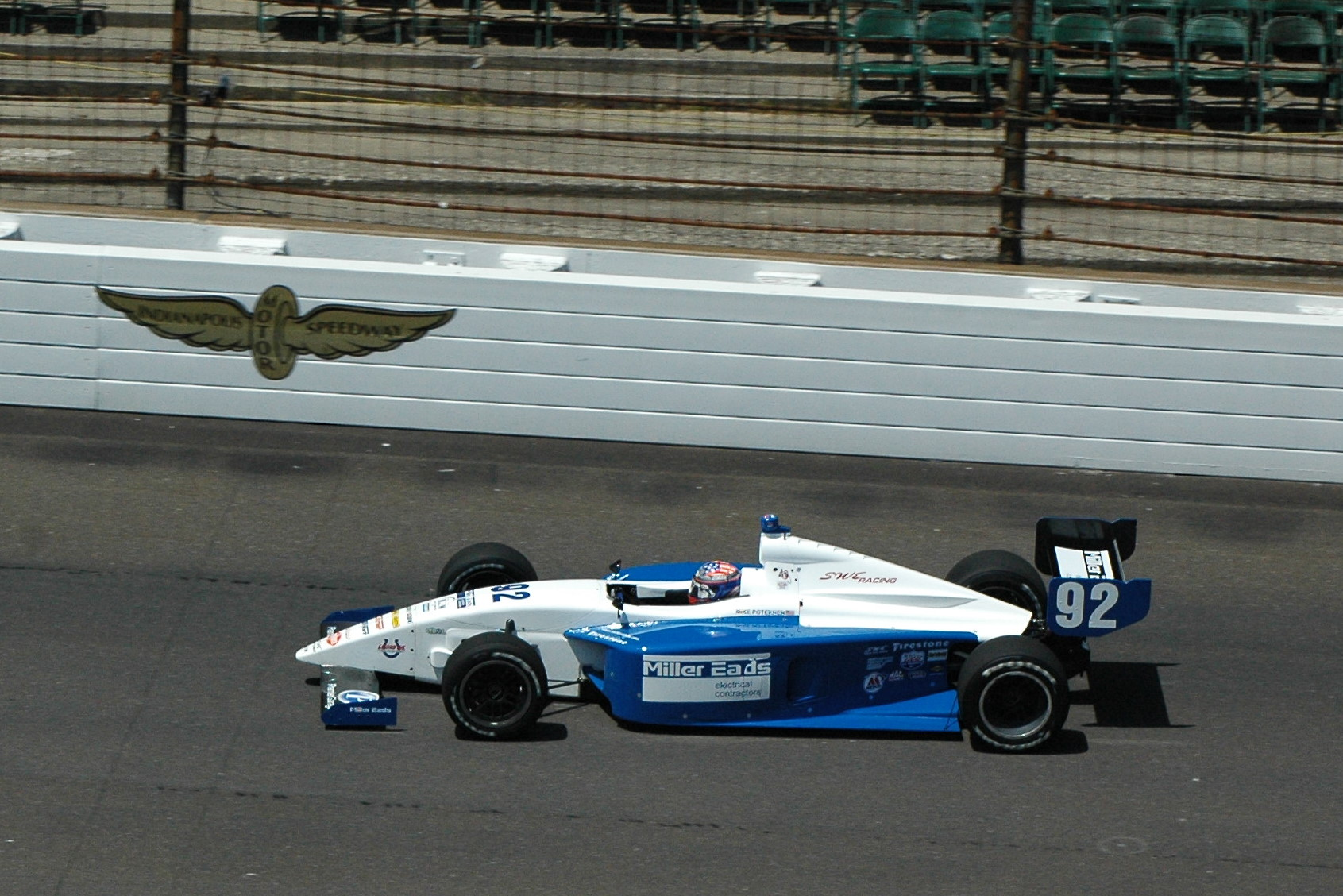
Potekhen driving in the 2008 Freedom 100 for Chastain Motorsports

With Apex Racing shutting down before the start of the season, Potekhen did not start the 2008 Indy Lights season until May 23, with SWE Racing/Chastain Motorsports in the Firestone Freedom 100. He returned to the team late in the season to make four more starts.

Potekhen missed the first four races of the 2009 season, but signed to join Alliance Motorsports for the Freedom 100. Potekhen returned to the team to make seven more starts and led his first laps in the series at Chicagoland Speedway late in the season. He finished eighteenth in points participating in only eight of fifteen races with a best finish of fourth at Homestead-Miami Speedway.

== Indy Lights ==
Year	Team	1	2	3	4	5	6	7	8	9	10	11	12	13	14	15	16	Rank	Points
2006	Part Sourcing International	HMS	STP1	STP2	INDY	WGL	IMS; 11	NSH	MIL	KTY; 10	SNM1; 6	SNM2; 6	CHI; 7					13th	121
2007	Apex Racing	HMS; 7	STP1; 11	STP2; 22	INDY; 6	MIL; 2	IMS1; 10	IMS2; 8	IOW; 12	WGL1; 9	WGL2; 7	NSH; 19	MOH; 9	KTY; 7	SNM1; 3	SNM2; 8	CHI; 5	5th	379
2008	SWE Racing	HMS	STP1	STP2	KAN	INDY; 13	MIL	IOW	WGL1	WGL2	NSH	MOH1	MOH2	KTY; 17	SNM1; 12	SNM2; 22	CHI; 9	29th	78
2009	Alliance Motorsports	STP1	STP2	LBH	KAN	INDY; 14	MIL	IOW; 14	WGL; 11	TOR	EDM	KTY; 8	MOH; 11	SNM; 16	CHI; 13	HMS; 4		18th	157
