= Cheever Racing =

American auto racing team

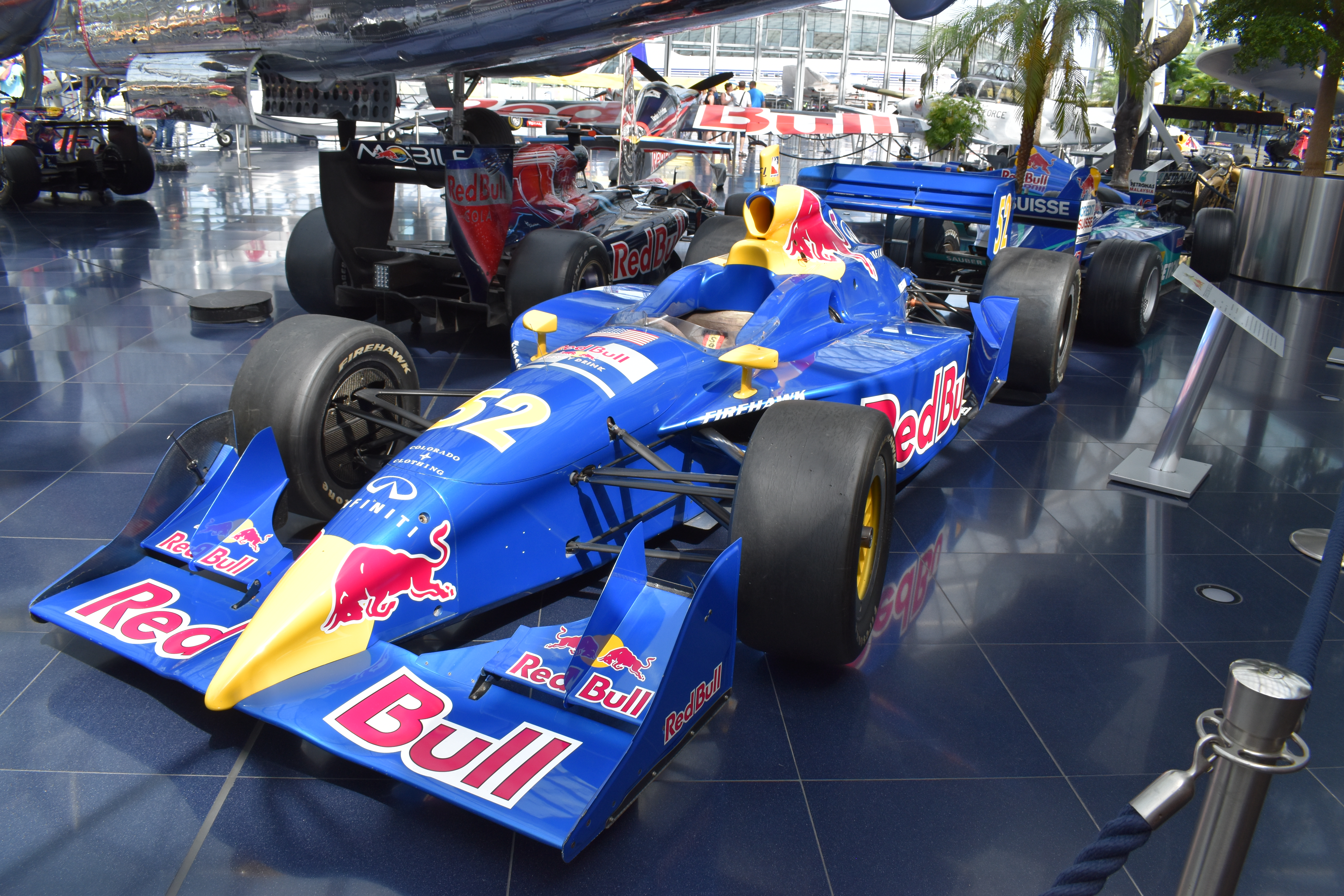
Team Cheever's 2002 Dallara IR-02 on display at Hangar-7 in 2019.

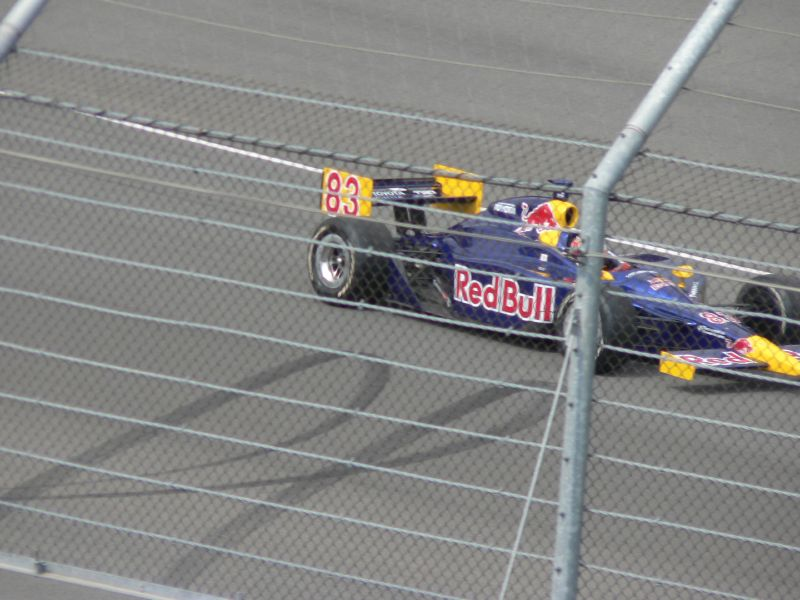
Patrick Carpentier driving for Cheever Racing at Twin Ring Motegi in 2005.

Cheever Racing was an auto racing team founded in 1996 by Eddie Cheever as Team Cheever in the Indy Racing League IndyCar Series. They fielded a car for Cheever for much of its existence, but occasionally ran two cars, almost always for the Indianapolis 500. The team won the 1998 Indianapolis 500 with Cheever driving and then switched to Infiniti engines and gained sponsorship from Excite for 2000. The team continued to be moderately successful and gained Infiniti's first series win. When Infiniti left the series in 2003 the team, which by then was sponsored by Red Bull switched to Chevrolet engines and then switched to Toyota in 2005, after Chevrolet's departure. Despite some of the most talented drivers in the league, a long string of bad luck and underpowered engines rendered the team little more than mid-pack. With no sponsor for the 2006 season, Eddie decided to trim the team to a single car and return to the cockpit as both a cost-cutting move and to seize the opportunity to return to racing before he felt he got too old to be competitive. Cheever only committed to drive until the Indianapolis 500 but continued until the 8th race of the season. The IRL operation shut down after the Kansas Speedway race when it could not find a sponsor or pay driver to continue.

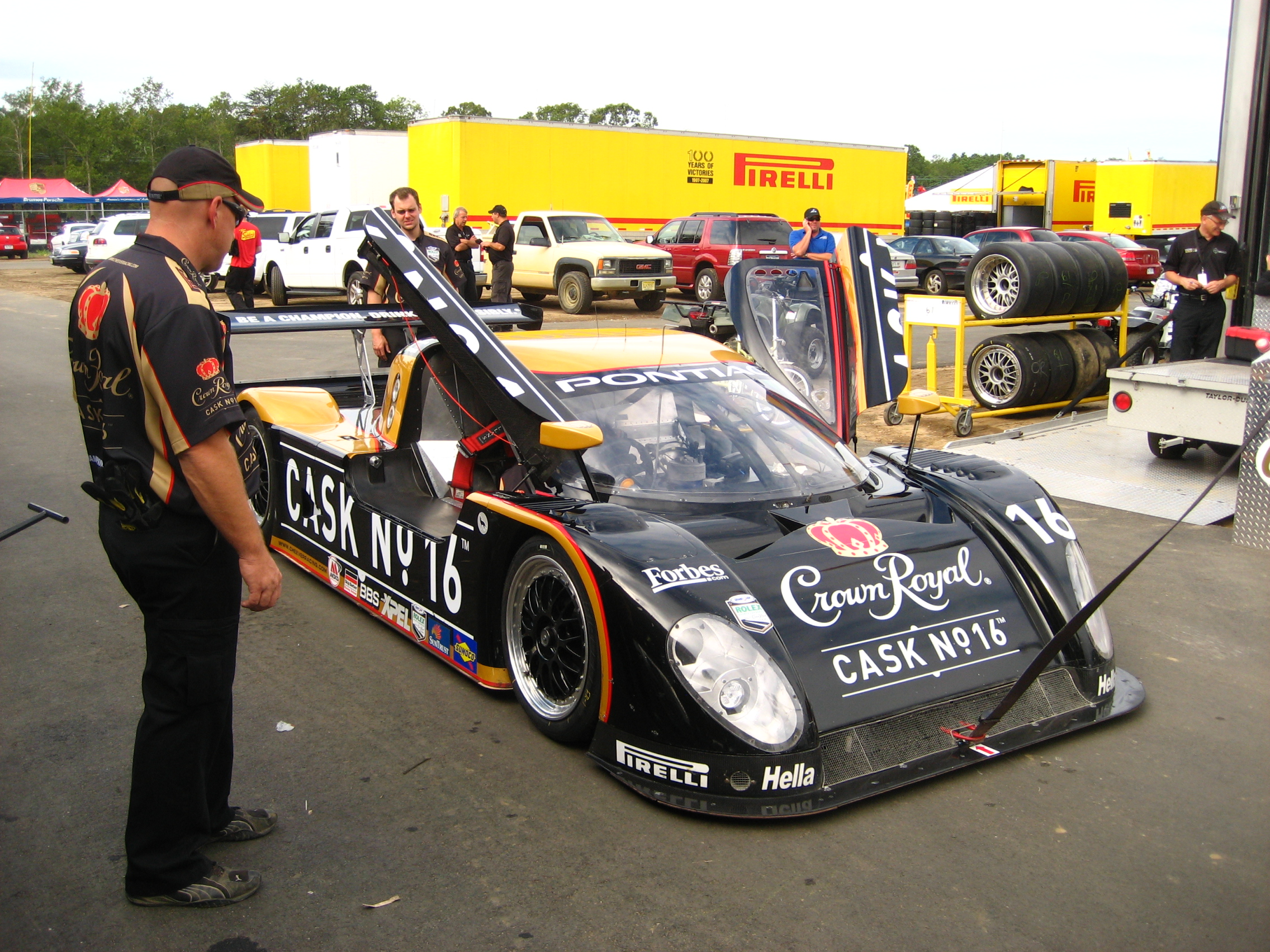
Cheever Racing's Coyote-Pontiac Grand-Am car at New Jersey Motorsports Park in 2008.

Cheever Racing also ran a Daytona Prototype car in the Grand-Am Rolex Sports Car Series. In 2007 Cheever purchased the intellectual property rights to the Fabcar chassis and has renewed its development and begun offering the chassis to other teams in the series. The car was subsequently renamed the Coyote chassis, in tribute to the racing cars built in the 1970s by A. J. Foyt Enterprises. Cheever Racing did not field any entries for the 2009 Rolex 24 at Daytona.

In 2006, Cheever also founded an Indy Pro Series team. In 2006, its car was driven by Chris Festa. Their driver for the 2007 season was Richard Antinucci, Eddie's nephew; Antinucci captured two wins on a part-time schedule.

== Drivers who have driven for Cheever ==
=== IRL IndyCar Series ===
- (United States) Alex Barron (2003–2005)
- (United States) Ed Carpenter (2004)
- (Canada) Patrick Carpentier (2005)
- (United States) Eddie Cheever (1996–2002, 2006)
- (Czech Republic) Tomáš Enge (2006)
- (Belgium) Wim Eyckmans (1999)
- (Canada) Scott Goodyear (2001)
- (United States) Robby McGehee (2002)
- (Italy) Max Papis (2002, 2006)
- (United States) Buddy Rice (2002–2003)
- (South Africa) Tomas Scheckter (2002)
- (United States) Robby Unser (1998)
- (United States) Jeff Ward (1997)

=== Indy Pro Series ===
- (United States) Richard Antinucci (2007)
- (United States) Chris Festa (2006)

=== Grand Am ===
- (Italy) Fabio Babini (2008)
- (Italy) Matteo Bobbi (2008)
- (United States) Harrison Brix (2007)
- (Canada) Patrick Carpentier (2006)
- (United States) Eddie Cheever (2006–2007)
- (France) Emmanuel Collard (2007)
- (Brazil) Tommy Erdos (2007–2008)
- (Brazil) Christian Fittipaldi (2006–2008)
- (Spain) Antonio García (2008)
- (Sweden) Stefan Johansson (2006)
- (United Kingdom) Tom Kimber-Smith (2008)
- (Germany) Lucas Luhr (2006)
- (Germany) Sascha Maassen (2007)
- (United States) Scott Mayer (2008)
- (United Kingdom) Mike Newton (2007–2008)
- (Brazil) Hoover Orsi (2006)
- (France) Stephane Ortelli (2008)
- (United States) Brent Sherman (2008)

== Racing results ==
=== Complete IRL IndyCar Series results ===
(key)

Year	Chassis	Engine	Tyres	Drivers	No.	1	2	3	4	5	6	7	8	9	10	11	12	13	14	15	16	17	Pts Pos	Pos
1996–1997						NHA	LSV	WDW	PHX	INDY	TXS	PPIR	CLT	NHA2	LSV2									
1996–1997	Lola T95/00	Menard V6t	G	(United States) Eddie Cheever	51	15	25																3rd	230
1996–1997	G-Force GF01	Oldsmobile Aurora V8	G	(United States) Eddie Cheever	51			1	12	23	6	4	6	9*	21								3rd	230
1996–1997	G-Force GF01	Oldsmobile Aurora V8	G	(United States) Jeff Ward	52					3													30th	69
1998			G			WDW	PHX	INDY	TXS	NHA	DOV	CLT	PPIR	ATL	TXS	LSV								
1998	Dallara IR8	Oldsmobile Aurora V8	G	(United States) Eddie Cheever	51	24	10	1*	26	9	16	20	8	3	25	5							9th	222
1998	Dallara IR8	Oldsmobile Aurora V8	G	(United States) Robby Unser	52					11													16th	176
1998	G-Force GF01B	Oldsmobile Aurora V8	G	(United States) Robby Unser	52			5	9		11		12	16	2	16							16th	176
1999						WDW	PHX	CLT	INDY	TXS	PPIR	ATL	DOV	PPIR	LSV	TXS								
1999	Dallara IR9	Oldsmobile Aurora V8	G	(United States) Eddie Cheever	51	1	17	C^{1}															7th	222
1999	Dallara IR9	Infiniti VRH35ADE V8	G	(United States) Eddie Cheever	51				18	16	4	6	21	11	17	4							7th	222
1999	Dallara IR9	Oldsmobile Aurora V8	G	(Belgium) Wim Eyckmans	52				23														45th	7
2000						WDW	PHX	LSV	INDY	TXS	PPIR	ATL	KTY	TXS										
2000	Riley & Scott Mk VII	Infiniti VRH35ADE V8	F	(United States) Eddie Cheever	51	3	10																3rd	257
2000	Dallara IR-00	Infiniti VRH35ADE V8	F	(United States) Eddie Cheever	51			11	5	9	1	21	4	2									3rd	257
2000	Dallara IR-00	Infiniti VRH35ADE V8	F	(United States) Ross Cheever	52				DNQ														NC	—
2001						PHX	HMS	ATL	INDY	TXS	PPIR	RIR	KAN	NSH	KTY	GAT	CHI	TXS						
2001	Dallara IR-01	Infiniti VRH35ADE V8	F	(United States) Eddie Cheever	51	19	9	24	26	12	6	13	1*	15	21	4	3	18					8th	261
2001	Dallara IR-01	Infiniti VRH35ADE V8	F	(Canada) Scott Goodyear	52				32														48th	1
2002						HMS	PHX	FON	NAZ	INDY	TXS	PPIR	RIR	KAN	NSH	MCH	KTY	GAT	CHI	TXS				
2002	Dallara IR-02	Infiniti VRH35ADE V8	F	(United States) Eddie Cheever	51	25	15	20	7	5	19	8	14	16	6	22	11	10	5	8			10th	280
2002	Dallara IR-02	Infiniti VRH35ADE V8	F	(South Africa) Tomas Scheckter	52	6	24	24	21	26*	17*	16	4	15*	13	1*	22	Wth					14th	210
2002	Dallara IR-02	Infiniti VRH35ADE V8	F	(United States) Buddy Rice	52													4	9	6			22nd	140
2002	Dallara IR-02	Infiniti VRH35ADE V8	F	(United States) Buddy Rice	53											2	12						22nd	140
2002	Dallara IR-02	Infiniti VRH35ADE V8	F	(Italy) Max Papis	53					23													43rd	16
2002	Dallara IR-02	Infiniti VRH35ADE V8	F	(United States) Robby McGehee	53															13			21st	142
2003						HMS	PHX	MOT	INDY	TXS	PPIR	RIR	KAN	NSH	MCH	GAT	KTY	NAZ	CHI	FON	TXS			
2003	Dallara IR-03	Chevrolet Indy V8	F	(United States) Buddy Rice	52	16	9	13	11	14	9	9	19	18	11	14	11	10					16th	229
2003	Dallara IR-03	Chevrolet Indy V8	F	(United States) Alex Barron	52														7	10	20		17th	216
2004						HMS	PHX	MOT	INDY	TXS	RIR	KAN	NSH	MIL	MCH	KTY	PPIR	NAZ	CHI	FON	TXS			
2004	Dallara IR-04	Chevrolet Indy V8	F	(United States) Alex Barron	51	16	4	12	12	3	22	10	17	7	11	11	10	12	12	18	14		12th	310
2004	Dallara IR-04	Chevrolet Indy V8	F	(United States) Ed Carpenter	52	12	19	22	31	21	16	14	22	11	14	8	11	20	11	12	21		16th	245
2005						HMS	PHX	STP	MOT	INDY	TXS	RIR	KAN	NSH	MIL	MCH	KTY	PPIR	SNM	CHI	WGL	FON		
2005	Dallara IR-05	Toyota Indy V8	F	(United States) Alex Barron	51	8	13	10	19	13	14	6	13	15	8	11	4	18	3	21	17	14	11th	329
2005	Dallara IR-05	Toyota Indy V8	F	(Canada) Patrick Carpentier	83	7	9	8	13	21	16	3	14	3	7	9	12	10	4	9	10	15	10th	376
2006						HMS	STP	MOT	INDY	WGL	TXS	RIR	KAN	NSH	MIL	MCH	KTY	SNM	CHI					
2006	Dallara IR-05	Honda HI6R V8	F	(United States) Eddie Cheever	51	10	11		13	17	17	14	14										19th	114
2006	Dallara IR-05	Honda HI6R V8	F	(Czech Republic) Tomáš Enge	51			19															32nd	12
2006	Dallara IR-05	Honda HI6R V8	F	(Italy) Max Papis	52				14														27th	16

1. The 1999 VisionAire 500K at Charlotte was cancelled after 79 laps due to spectator fatalities.

=== Complete Indy Pro Series results ===
(key)

Year	Car	Drivers	No.	1	2	3	4	5	6	7	8	9	10	11	12	13	14	15	16	D.C.	Points
2006	Dallara-Nissan			HMS	STP		INDY	WGL	IMS	NSH	MIL	KTY	SNM		CHI						
2006	Dallara-Nissan	(United States) Chris Festa	51	16	6	8	4	14	15	9	Wth	8			5					8th	205
2007	Dallara-Nissan			HMS	STP		INDY	MIL	IMS		IOW	WGL		NSH	MOH	KTY	SNM		CHI		
2007	Dallara-Nissan	(United States) Richard Antinucci	51		19	15			9	6		8	5		1		2	1		15th	273

== IndyCar wins ==
#	Season	Date	Sanction	Track / Race	No.	Winning driver	Chassis	Engine	Tire	Grid	Laps Led
1	1996-97	January 25	IRL	Walt Disney World Speedway (O)	51	(United States) Eddie Cheever	G-Force GF01	Oldsmobile Aurora V8	Goodyear	5	4
2	1998	May 24	IRL	Indianapolis 500 (O)	51	(United States) Eddie Cheever (2)	Dallara IR8	Oldsmobile Aurora V8	Goodyear	17	76
3	1999	January 24	IRL	Walt Disney World Speedway (O)	51	(United States) Eddie Cheever (3)	Dallara IR9	Oldsmobile Aurora V8	Goodyear	13	40
4	2000	June 18	IRL	Pikes Peak International Raceway (O)	51	(United States) Eddie Cheever (4)	Dallara IR-00	Infiniti VRH35ADE V8	Firestone	10	39
5	2001	July 8	IRL	Kansas Speedway (O)	51	(United States) Eddie Cheever (5)	Dallara IR-01	Infiniti VRH35ADE V8	Firestone	2	104
6	2002	July 28	IRL	Michigan International Speedway (O)	52	(South Africa) Tomas Scheckter (R)	Dallara IR-02	Infiniti VRH35ADE V8	Firestone	Pole	122
