= Chris Festa =

American racing driver

- Nationality: American
- Born: September 5, 1985 (age 41) Atlanta, Georgia, U.S.
- Retired: 2008

Firestone Indy Lights Series
- Years active: 2005-2008
- Teams: Sam Schmidt Motorsports; Cheever Racing; Target Chip Ganassi Racing; Alliance Motorsports
- Car number: 19, 51, 9, 24
- Starts: 46
- Wins: 0
- Poles: 2
- Fastest laps: 1
- Best finish: 6th in 2005

Previous series
- 2004 2003: Toyota Atlantic; USF2000

Chris Festa (born September 5, 1985) is an American former auto racing driver who last competed in the Indy Lights Series in 2008.

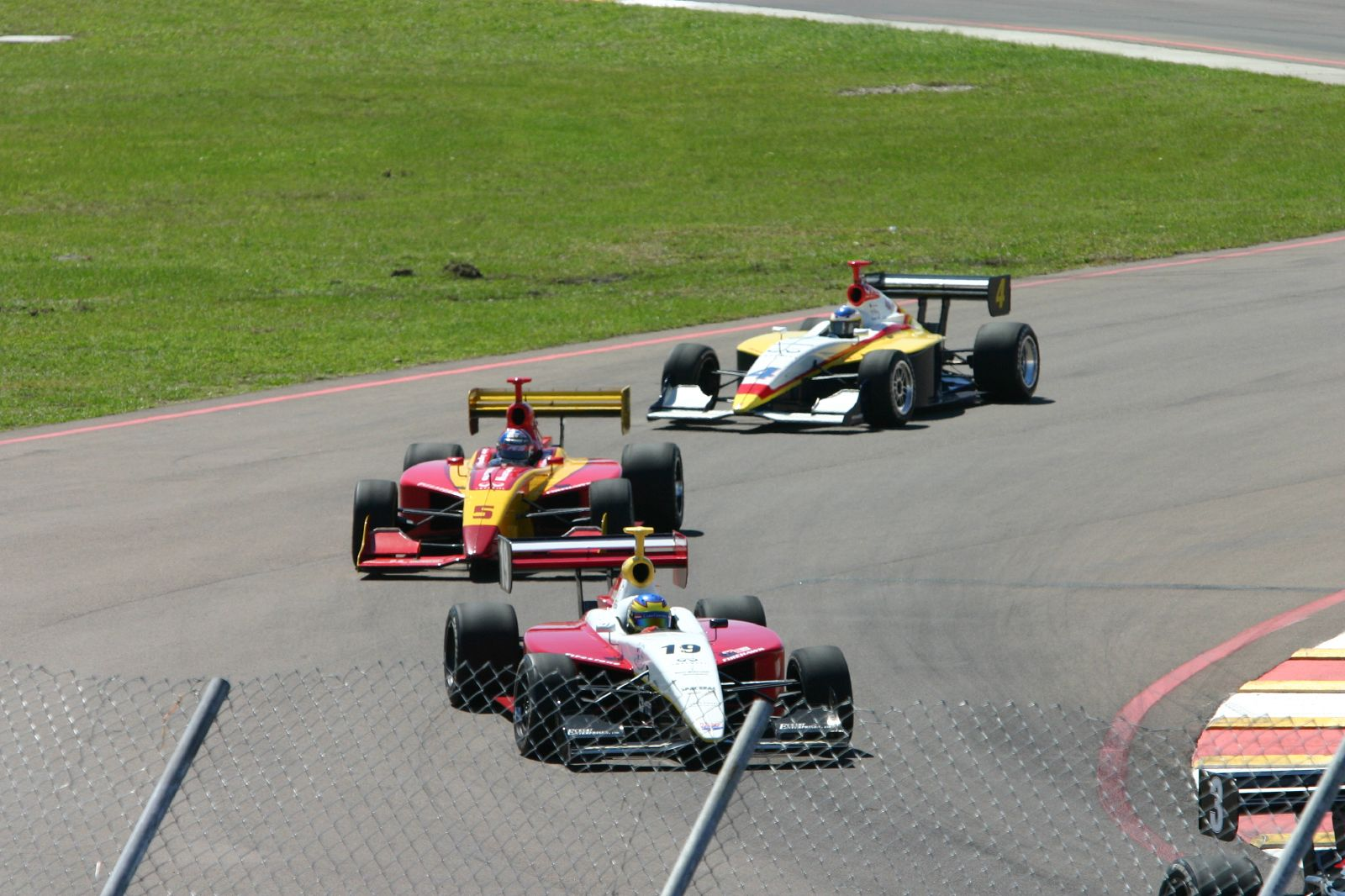
Festa leading Arie Luyendyk Jr. and Marty Roth during a race on the Streets of St. Petersburg in 2005

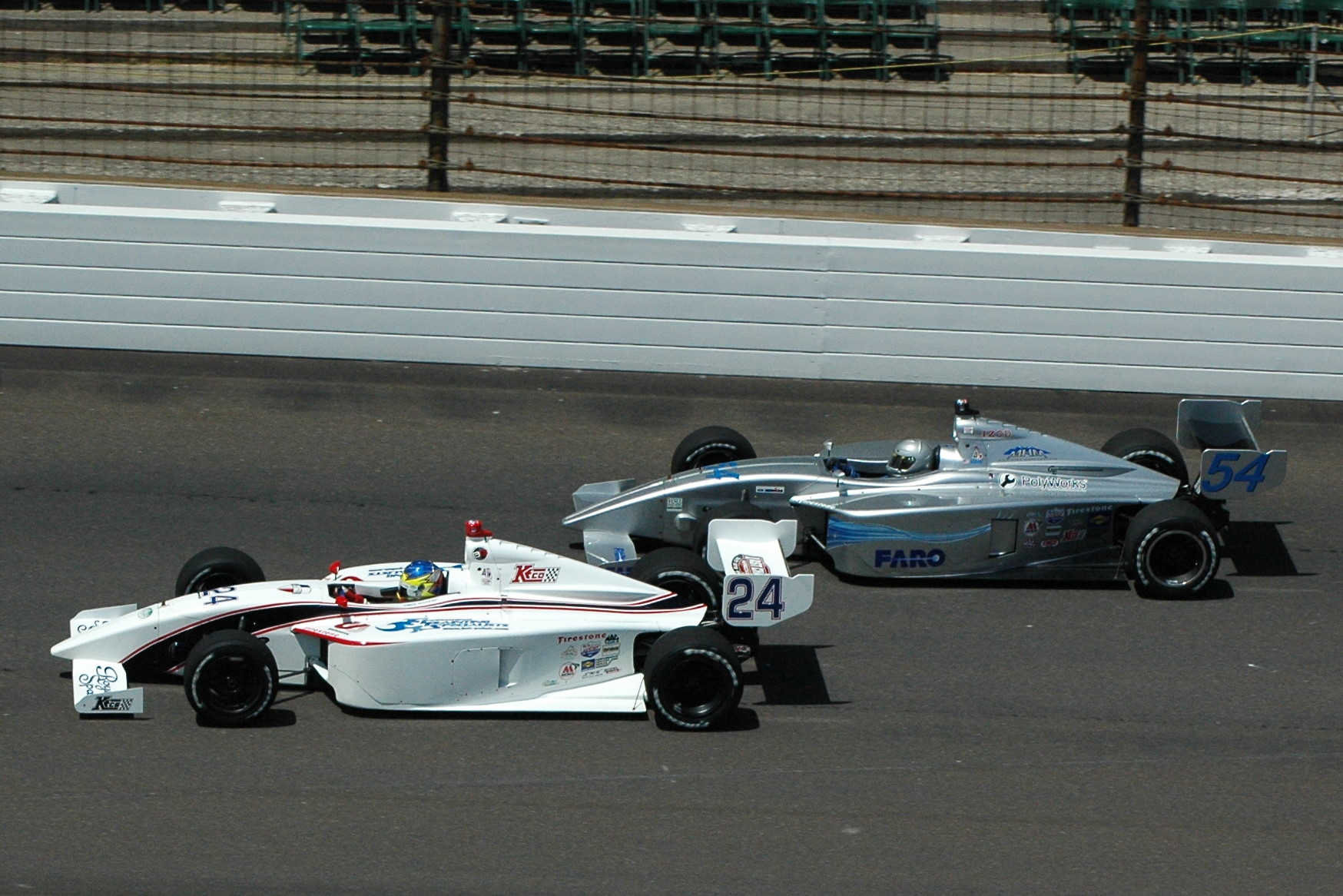
Festa (inside) racing alongside Micky Gilbert in the 2008 Firestone Freedom 100

He began his career in 1998 in go-karting and later became a driver for Paul Tracy Karting. He captured a total of 62 wins in his first seven years of competition. He raced in Formula Ford Zetec in 2003 and in the Toyota Atlantic Championship in 2004, where he drove for Rahal Letterman Racing and was teammates with Danica Patrick.

Festa first raced in the Infiniti Pro Series (later Indy Lights) in 2005 with Sam Schmidt Motorsports, placing sixth overall. He moved to Cheever Racing for the following season and finished eighth overall after being forced to miss the doubleheader meeting at Infineon Raceway due to undergoing treatment for mononucleosis.

He was part of the No. 7 SAMAX Motorsport Daytona Prototype team at the 2007 24 Hours of Daytona, where they finished in sixth place.

Festa continued to compete in Indy Lights that year, driving the No. 9 car full-time for Target Chip Ganassi Racing. He took pole for the season opener at Homestead-Miami Speedway and finished tenth overall. He also participated in an IndyCar test at The Milwaukee Mile alongside regular team driver Scott Dixon and made a single Rolex Sports Car Series start for Ganassi at Watkins Glen, where he placed second alongside teammates Scott Pruett and Memo Rojas.

Festa returned to Indy Lights in 2008 with the Alliance Motorsports team, but left both the team and the series after 7 of 16 races and finished 22nd in points. He has not competed professionally since. His best career finish in 46 Indy Lights starts was second place, which he achieved on three occasions.

Festa is a brother of Kappa Sigma at Florida State University, where he majored in marketing.

== Complete motorsports results ==
=== American Open-Wheel racing results ===
(key) (Races in bold indicate pole position, races in italics indicate fastest race lap)

==== USF2000 National Championship results ====
| Year | Entrant | 1 | 2 | 3 | 4 | 5 | 6 | 7 | 8 | 9 | 10 | 11 | 12 | Pos | Points |
|---|---|---|---|---|---|---|---|---|---|---|---|---|---|---|---|
| 2003 | PR1 Motorsports | SEB1; 15 | SEB2; 11 | LRP1; 9 | LRP1; 16 | MOH1; 10 | MOH2; 10 | ROA1; 9 | ROA2; 25 | MOH3; 9 | MOH4; 5 | ATL1; 10 | ATL2; 24 | **11th** | **107** |

==== Atlantic Championship ====
| Year | Team | 1 | 2 | 3 | 4 | 5 | 6 | 7 | 8 | 9 | 10 | 11 | 12 | Rank | Points |
|---|---|---|---|---|---|---|---|---|---|---|---|---|---|---|---|
| 2004 | Team Rahal/Letterman | LBH; 11 | MTY; 7 | MIL; 7 | POR1; 10 | POR2; 6 | CLE; 14 | TOR; 8 | VAN; 13 | ROA; 8 | DEN; 7 | MTL; 7 | LS; 7 | **8th** | **172** |

==== Indy Lights ====
| Year | Team | 1 | 2 | 3 | 4 | 5 | 6 | 7 | 8 | 9 | 10 | 11 | 12 | 13 | 14 | 15 | 16 | Rank | Points |
|---|---|---|---|---|---|---|---|---|---|---|---|---|---|---|---|---|---|---|---|
| 2005 | Sam Schmidt Motorsports | HMS; 10 | PHX; 2 | STP; 8 | IND; 8 | TXS; 3 | IMS; 3 | NSH; 7 | MIL; 10 | KTY; 9 | PPIR; 6 | SNM; 5 | CHI; 11 | WGL; 4 | FON; 4 | | | **6th** | **387** |
| 2006 | Cheever Racing | HMS; 16 | STP1; 6 | **STP2**; 8 | INDY; 4 | WGL; 14 | IMS; 15 | NSH; 9 | MIL | KTY; 8 | SNM1 | SNM2 | CHI; 5 | | | | | **8th** | **205** |
| 2007 | Chip Ganassi Racing | **HMS**; 2 | STP1; 8 | STP2; 12 | INDY; 2 | MIL; 21 | IMS1; 11 | IMS2; 14 | IOW; 16 | WGL1; 21 | WGL2; 17 | NSH; 9 | MOH; 13 | KTY; 4 | SNM1; 13 | SNM2; 19 | CHI; 19 | **10th** | **313** |
| 2008 | Alliance Motorsports | HMS; 5 | STP1; 11 | STP2; 15 | KAN; 16 | INDY; 18 | MIL; 13 | IOW; 18 | WGL1 | WGL2 | NSH | MOH1 | MOH2 | KTY | SNM1 | SNM2 | CHI | **22nd** | **119** |
