= Luis Pérez Companc =

Argentinian rally driver (born 1972)

- Companc at the 2023 24 Hours of Le Mans
- Nationality: (Argentina) Argentine
- Born: January 2, 1972 (age 54) Buenos Aires, Argentina
- Categorisation: FIA Silver (until 2013); FIA Bronze (2014–)

World Rally Championship record
- Years active: 2001–2008
- Co-driver: (Argentina) Jose Maria Volta (Argentina) José Luis Díaz
- Teams: Bozian Racing, Ford, Stobart Ford, Munchi's Ford World Rally Team
- Rallies: 25
- Championships: 0
- Rally wins: 0
- Podiums: 0
- Stage wins: 0
- Total points: 9
- First rally: 2001 Rally Argentina
- Last rally: 2008 Rally Finland

24 Hours of Le Mans career
- Years: 2009, 2011-
- Teams: AF Corse, PeCom Racing
- Best finish: 9th (2012)
- Class wins: 0

Luis Pérez Companc (born 2 January 1972) is a rally and racing driver.

Companc competed at the World Rally Championship from 2001 to 2008, claiming a fifth place at the 2007 Rally Japan, a sixth at the 2004 Rally Argentina, and seventh at the 2006 Rally New Zealand. In 2007 he founded the Munchi's Ford World Rally Team.

Companc has competed in sports car racing since 2008, with spells at the FIA GT Championship, FIA World Endurance Championship, European Le Mans Series and IMSA SportsCar Championship. He claimed class wins at the 2009 24 Hours of Spa, 2013 6 Hours of Spa-Francorchamps and 2014 6 Hours of Spa-Francorchamps, plus class podiums at the 24 Hours of Le Mans in 2012 and 2014.

Companc is a son of Gregorio Pérez Companc, and the older brother of Pablo Pérez Companc, also involved in motorsport as a one-time Indy Pro Series racer with the Chip Ganassi Racing team, but who suffered serious injuries in an on-track incident in 2007.

== Rallying career ==
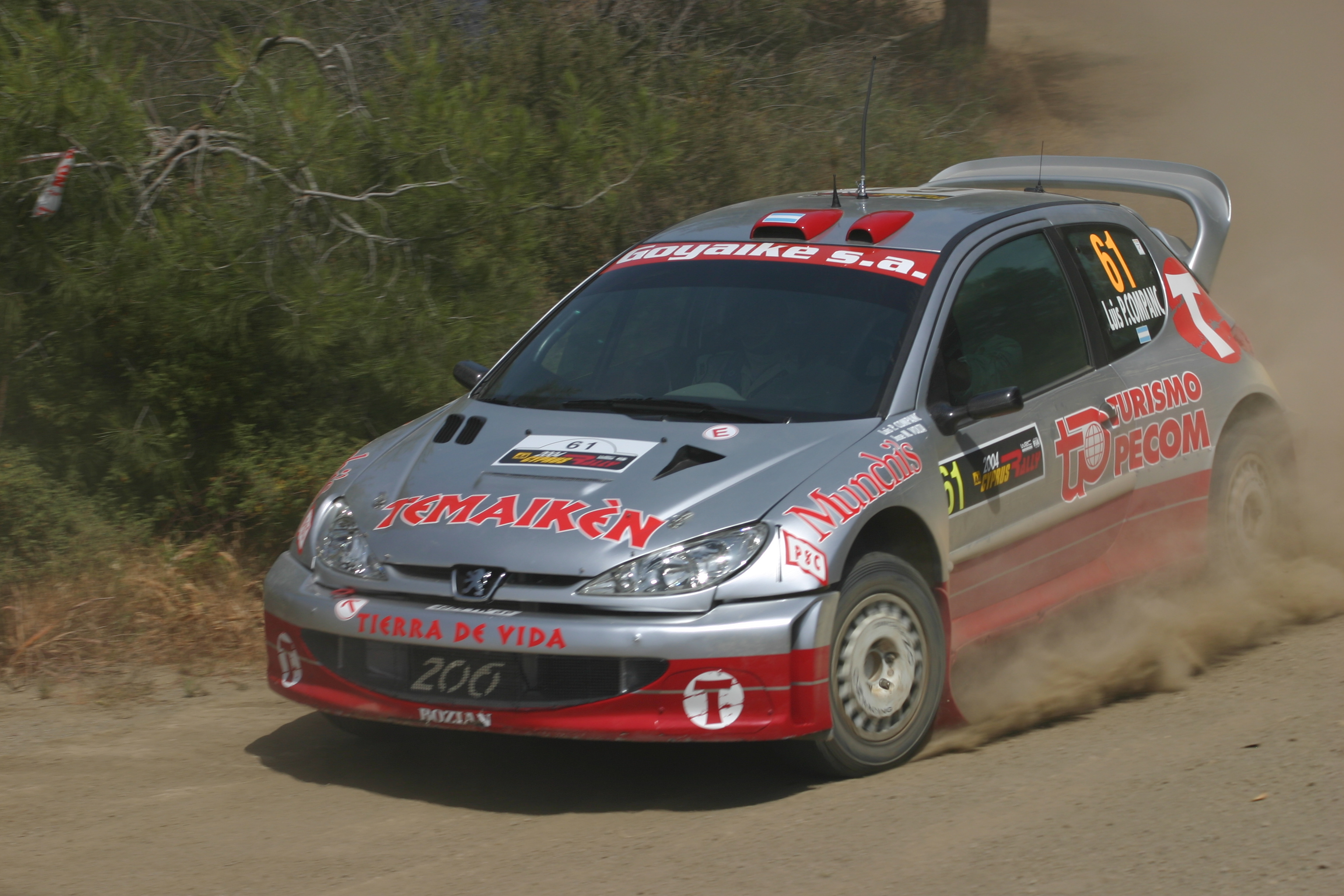
Companc driving a Peugeot 206 WRC at the 2004 Cyprus Rally.

Companc competed initially in the Production World Rally Championship. He debuted on his home event in 2001. He then won the Argentina Rally Championship in 2005 with a Toyota Corolla WRC. His profile heightened for the 2006 season, when he assumed a place in the newly formed Stobart VK M-Sport Ford team alongside the teenager Matthew Wilson, son of Malcolm Wilson, the boss of both the Stobart VK squad and the Blue Oval marque's more senior manufacturer-backed works team, which would incidentally go on to win the world manufacturers' title that year.

Having initially fared on the early season rallies with older, 2004-specification Ford Focus RS WRCs, both Companc and Wilson would eventually be entrusted with examples of the 2006 championship-winning car, an arrangement which persisted into the 2007 season. Aboard the Focus, Companc competed on eight rallies in all in 2006, while planning ten rounds for the following year, and scored his first WRC points on the 2006 Rally New Zealand. Companc's team for 2007, Munchi's Ford World Rally Team chose to pair him with fellow native, Juan Pablo Raies, who was in turn co-driven by Pérez Companc's brother, Jorge. When Raies was replaced in the Munchi's team's post-Rally Argentina lineup by Federico Villagra, winner of that rally in Group N, Jorge Pérez Companc continued his co-driving duties in the second car, with the exception of Rally Japan when Villagra was co-driven by José Díaz, according to personal problems of Jorge.

Companc's last WRC participation was at the 2008 Rally Finland.

== Complete WRC results ==
Year	Entrant	Car	1	2	3	4	5	6	7	8	9	10	11	12	13	14	15	16	WDC	Points
2001	Luis Pérez Companc	Mitsubishi Lancer Evo VI	MON	SWE	POR	ESP	ARG; 13	CYP	GRE	KEN	FIN	NZL	ITA	FRA	AUS	GBR			NC	0
2002	Luis Pérez Companc	Mitsubishi Lancer Evo VII	MON	SWE	FRA	ESP	CYP; Ret	ARG; Ret	GRE	KEN	FIN	GER	ITA	NZL	AUS	GBR			NC	0
2003	Luis Pérez Companc	Mitsubishi Lancer Evo VII	MON	SWE	TUR	NZL	ARG; Ret	GRE	CYP	GER	FIN	AUS	ITA	FRA	ESP	GBR			NC	0
2004	Bozian Racing	Peugeot 206 WRC	MON	SWE	MEX; Ret	NZL	CYP; Ret	GRE	TUR	ARG; 6	FIN	GER	JPN	GBR	ITA; Ret	FRA	ESP	AUS	23rd	3
2005	BP Ford World Rally Team	Ford Focus RS WRC 04	MON	SWE	MEX	NZL; Ret	ITA	CYP	TUR	GRE	ARG; 14	FIN	GER	GBR	JPN	FRA	ESP	AUS	NC	0
2006	Stobart VK Ford Rally Team	Ford Focus RS WRC 04	MON	SWE; 23	MEX; 12	ESP	FRA	ARG; 9	ITA; 12	GRE	GER	FIN		CYP; 14	TUR				26th	2
2006	Stobart VK Ford Rally Team	Ford Focus RS WRC 06											JPN; 11			AUS; 22	NZL; 7	GBR	26th	2
2007	Munchi's Ford World Rally Team	Ford Focus RS WRC 06	MON	SWE; 15	NOR	MEX; 19	POR	ARG; 28	ITA; Ret	GRE; 11	FIN; 11	GER	NZL; 23	ESP; Ret	FRA	JPN; 5	IRE	GBR; Ret	16th	4
2008	Munchi's Ford World Rally Team	Ford Focus RS WRC 07	MON	SWE	MEX	ARG; Ret	JOR	ITA	GRE	TUR	FIN; Ret	GER	NZL	ESP	FRA	JPN	GBR		NC	0

== Racing record ==
=== Complete FIA GT Championship results ===
Year	Team	Class	Car	Engine	1	2	3	4	5	6	7	8	9	10	11	12	13	Pos	Points
2008	Advanced Engineering Pecom Racing Team	GT2	Ferrari F430 GTC	Ferrari 4.3 L V8	SIL; 9	MNZ; 9	ADR; 6	OSC; 6	SPA; 6H	SPA; 12H	SPA; 24H	BUC; 1 Ret	BUC; 2; 6	BRN; 6	NOG; 9	ZOL; 5	SAN; 1	11th	24.5
2009	Pecom Racing	GT2	Ferrari F430 GTC	Ferrari 4.3 L V8	SIL; 2	ADR	OSC; Ret		BUD; 7	ALG; 4	LEC; 4	ZOL; 10						6th	30
2009	AF Corse	GT2	Ferrari F430 GTC	Ferrari 4.3 L V8				SPA; 1										6th	30

=== 24 Hours of Le Mans results ===
Year	Team	Co-Drivers	Car	Class	Laps	Pos.	Class Pos.
2009	(Italy) AF Corse	(Italy) Gianmaria Bruni (Argentina) Matías Russo	Ferrari F430 GT2	GT2	317	26th	6th
2010	(Italy) AF Corse	(Finland) Mika Salo (Argentina) Matías Russo	Ferrari F430 GT2	GT2	0	DNS	DNS
2011	(Argentina) PeCom Racing	(Argentina) Matías Russo (Germany) Pierre Kaffer	Lola B11/40-Judd	LMP2	139	DNF	DNF
2012	(Argentina) PeCom Racing	(Germany) Pierre Kaffer (France) Soheil Ayari	Oreca 03-Nissan	LMP2	352	9th	**3rd**
2013	(Argentina) PeCom Racing	(Germany) Pierre Kaffer (France) Nicolas Minassian	Oreca 03-Nissan	LMP2	325	10th	4th
2014	(Italy) AF Corse	(Italy) Marco Cioci (Italy) Mirko Venturi	Ferrari 458 Italia GT2	GTE; Am	331	22nd	**3rd**
2019	(Singapore) Clearwater Racing	(Republic of Ireland) Matt Griffin (Italy) Matteo Cressoni	Ferrari 488 GTE	GTE; Am	331	37th	7th
2023	(Italy) Richard Mille AF Corse	(Italy) Alessio Rovera (France) Lilou Wadoux	Ferrari 488 GTE Evo	GTE; Am	33	DNF	DNF

=== Complete FIA World Endurance Championship results ===
(key) (Races in bold indicate pole position; races in italics indicate fastest lap)

Year	Entrant	Class	Chassis	Engine	1	2	3	4	5	6	7	8	Rank	Points
2012	PeCom Racing	LMP2	Oreca 03	Nissan VK45DE 4.5 V8	SEB; 6	SPA; 20	LMS; 7	SIL; 11	SÃO; 8	BHR; 6	FUJ; 11	SHA; 10	16th	34.5
2013	PeCom Racing	LMP2	Oreca 03	Nissan VK45DE 4.5 V8	SIL; 3	**SPA**; 1	LMS; 4	SÃO; 3	COA; 2	FUJ; 5	SHA; Ret	**BHR**; 7	4th	110
2014	AF Corse	LMGTE Am	Ferrari 458 Italia GT2	Ferrari 4.5 L V8	SIL; 6	SPA; 1	LMS; 3	COA; 4	FUJ	SHA	BHR	SÃO	6th	76
2018–19	Clearwater Racing	LMGTE Am	Ferrari 488 GTE	Ferrari F154CB 3.9 L Turbo V8	SPA	LMS	SIL	FUJ	SHA	SEB; DNS	SPA; 3	LMS; 3	15th	38
2023	Richard Mille AF Corse	LMGTE Am	Ferrari 488 GTE Evo	Ferrari F154CB 3.9 L Turbo V8	SEB; Ret	PRT; 2	SPA; 1	LMS; Ret	MNZ; 6	FUJ; 9	BHR; 9		8th	56

=== Complete WeatherTech SportsCar Championship results ===
(key) (Races in bold indicate pole position; results in italics indicate fastest lap)

Year	Team	Class	Make	Engine	1	2	3	4	5	6	7	8	9	10	11	12	Pos.	Points	Ref
2022	AF Corse	GTD	Ferrari 488 GT3 Evo 2020	Ferrari F154CB 3.9 L Turbo V8	DAY; 4	SEB; 3	LBH	LGA	MDO	DET	WGL; 8	MOS	LIM	ELK	VIR	PET; 8	20th	1119	
2023	AF Corse	GTD	Ferrari 296 GT3	Ferrari 3.0 L Turbo V6	DAY; 19	SEB	LBH	MON	WGL	MOS	LIM	ELK	VIR	IMS	PET		66th	136	
2024	Richard Mille AF Corse	LMP2	Oreca 07	Gibson GK428 4.2 L V8	DAY; 12	SEB; 13	WGL; 1	MOS; 9	ELK; 5	IMS; 6	ATL; 6						8th	1860	
2025	AF Corse	LMP2	Oreca 07	Gibson GK428 4.2 L V8	DAY; 7	SEB; 10	WGL; 6	MOS	ELK; 12	IMS; 11	ATL; 5						21st	1493	

=== Complete Asian Le Mans Series results ===
(key) (Races in bold indicate pole position) (Races in italics indicate fastest lap)

Year	Team	Class	Car	Engine	1	2	3	4	5	6	Pos.	Points
2026–27	AF Corse	Hypercar	Ferrari 499P	Ferrari F163CG 3.0 L Turbo V6	LEC; 1; 1	**LEC**; **2**; 1	JER; 1	JER; 2	ALG; 1	ALG; 2	1st*	51*
