= Pablo Pérez Companc =

Argentine racing driver

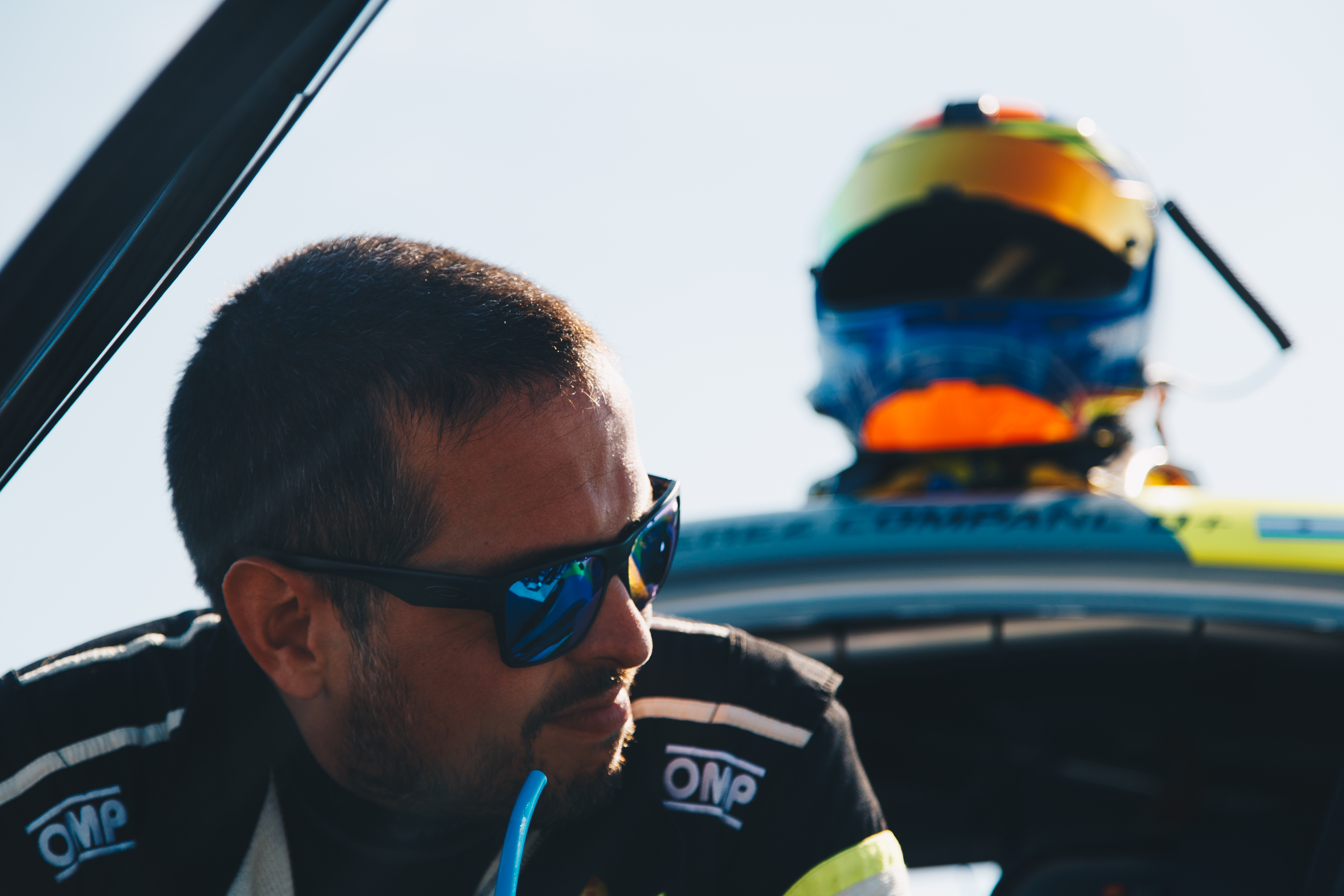
Pablo Pérez Companc at round 1 of the 2017 Pirelli World Challenge

Pablo Pérez Companc (born December 11, 1982) is an Argentine racing driver from Buenos Aires.

Pérez Companc started editing the Argentine version of Evo in 2012 and Octane in 2013.

His father is businessman Gregorio Pérez Companc. He is the younger brother of Ford World Rally Championship rally driver, Luís Pérez Companc.

== Motorsport career ==
Pérez Companc began his racing career in the Canadian Formula Ford 2000 in 2000. In 2001 and 2002, he drove in the Argentine Formula Renault Championship. From 2004 to 2005, Pérez Companc competed in the Formula Three Sudamericana. In 2004, he drove for PropCar Racing and finished thirteenth in points, and in 2005, he drove for Nasr-Castroneves Racing and captured his first win and finished ninth in points. The year 2006, saw him move to GT 2000, an Argentine sports car series, where he won all three races he contested.

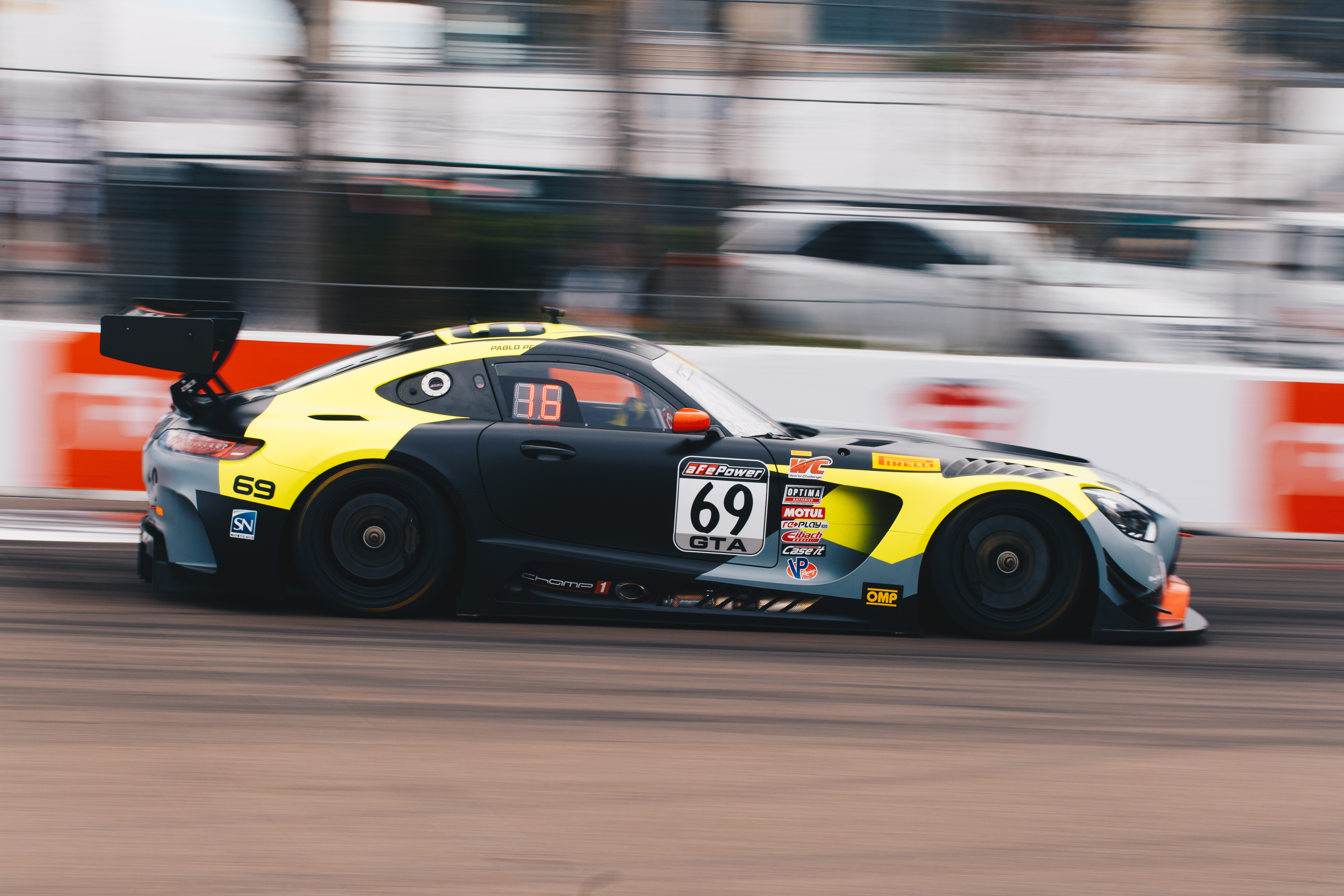
Pablo piloting the Champ 1 Motorsports AMG GT3 in the Pirelli World Challenge Series

Pérez Companc signed with Chip Ganassi Racing for 2007 in the Indy Pro Series. In his first race for the team at Homestead-Miami Speedway, he made contact with Sean Guthrie's car on lap 47. His car launched over Guthrie and into the catch fence where the footbox of his car was sheared off, resulting in what an observer termed as "gruesome" injuries to his feet and legs. He underwent extensive surgery on both legs below the knees. He was able to attend activities at Indy in May, 2007 using a wheelchair. The following year, he had recovered and returned to GT 2000 where he won two of the four races he contested. He followed that up with winning the 2009 championship, capturing victories in eight of the ten races. However, 2010 was less successful as he only won once and finished eleventh in the championship. He continued to drive in GT 2000 in 2011.

In 2017, Pérez Companc competed in the Pirelli World Challenge with the Champ 1 Motorsports Mercedes-AMG GT3.

== Car collection ==
Companc is a prolific collector of automobiles and founded the Florida-based Squadra Lupo Import to house his extensive collection. The collection houses a number of Group B cars, as well as supercars and muscle cars.

The collection includes:

- Pagani Zonda Revolucion, #3 of 5
- Pagani Huayra BC, nicknamed "Wild Minion"
- Liquid Carbon Fibre Ford GT
- Ford GT (2005)
- Lamborghini Gallardo Squadra Corse
- Lamborghini Huracán Super Trofeo Evo
- Porsche 911 GT2 RS
- Ford RS200
- BMW E30 M3
- Lancia Delta
- Shelby GT500
- Dodge Demon
- Alfa Romeo 155 V6 TI
- Peugeot 205 T16
- Renault 5 Turbo
- Subaru Impreza WRC ex Peter Solberg
- Aston Martin Vantage V12
- Mercedes 190 EVO II

== Motorsport results ==
=== American open-wheel racing ===
(key) (Races in bold indicate pole position)

==== Indy Lights ====
Year	Team	1	2	3	4	5	6	7	8	9	10	11	12	13	14	15	16	Rank	Points	Ref
2007	Chip Ganassi Racing	HMS; 18	STP1	STP2	INDY	MIL	IMS1	IMS2	IOW	WGL1	WGL2	NSH	MOH	KTY	SNM1	SNM2	CHI	39th	12	
