= Gregorio Pérez Companc =

Argentine businessman (1934–2024)

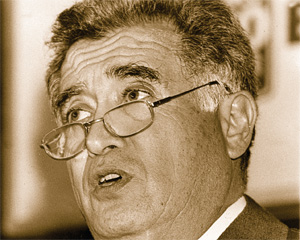
- Companc in 1988
- Born: Jorge Gregorio Bazán; 23 August 1934; Buenos Aires, Argentina
- Died: 14 June 2024 (aged 89)
- Occupation: Principal shareholder of Molinos Río de la Plata
- Spouse: María Carmen Sundblad Beccar Varela
- Children: 8, including Luis and Pablo

Gregorio Pérez Companc (born Jorge Gregorio Bazán; 23 August 1934 – 14 June 2024) also known as Don Gregorio or Goyo, was an Argentine businessman who was one of the country's wealthiest individuals, with an estimated net worth of US$3.9 billion as of April 2024.

== Background ==
He was born Jorge Gregorio Bazán in Buenos Aires on 23 August 1934. He was adopted in 1945 by Margarita Companc de Pérez Acuña, a local socialite, and enrolled at the La Salle college preparatory school, though he left before graduating. He married María del Carmen "Munchi" Sundblad Beccar-Varela, an heiress, in 1964, and in 1968, was named director of the Banco Río de La Plata (at the time of the country's largest, private-sector banks), following its purchase by his family. He built much of his fortune, however, as head of Petrolera Pérez Companc, a family-based conglomerate in oil and gas that was first established by Gregorio's adoptive father in 1946.

Pérez Companc purchased a controlling stake in Banco Río de la Plata from his siblings in 1993, and would sell his shares to Spanish banking giant Banco Santander in 1997. Between 1990 and 1994, the company expanded its domestic activities in the oil business and in a number of other industries through participation in the country's privatization programme initiated by President Carlos Menem. By 1996, Pérez Companc S.A. had consolidated sales of US$1.41 billion. The family strengthened its hand in 1998 by forming a new public holding company, PC Holdings S.A., and later that year, acquired a 68% share in local food giant Molinos Río de la Plata from the traditional agribusiness house, Bunge y Born, for US$380 million. Molinos Río de la Plata, which sells Luchetti's pasta, Cocinero oils and Nobleza Gaucha yerba mate (among numerous brands), is one of Argentina's leading processed foods companies, earning roughly US$850 million in revenues in 2009.

=== Transition into the 21st century ===
In 1999, shareholders in Pérez Companc S.A. exchanged their voting shares for nonvoting shares (Class B shares) in PC Holdings S.A.: this raised some concern from financial and political analyst, since in such a transaction the controlling shareholders would have multiple vote shares to ensure their continuing voting control. However, the Comision Nacional de Valores approved the exchange, thus allowing the Pérez Companc family to own 58% of the company with 80% voting control. The 1998–2002 Argentine great depression produced numerous problems for the country's energy sector, and 1999 revenues for Petrolera Pérez Companc declined 3% to US$1.27 billion. The family also sold their 19% stake in Banco Río de la Plata during 1999. In a year that saw the Argentine economy shaken by the worst economic turmoil in over a century, Pérez Companc continued to oversee growth in the family's business concerns: the value of the group's consolidated energy, food processing and financial services portfolio grew a healthy 20% during 2001.

He scored a big coup in October 2002 when he announced the sale of the family's 60% share of Petrolera Pérez Companc to Brazilian oil giant Petroleo Brasileiro S.A. (Petrobras) for a reported US$1 billion in cash and bonds.

== Personal life ==
Gregorio Pérez Companc and his wife, María del Carmen Sundblad Beccar Varela, have eight children including Luis and Pablo. The family is deeply religious and have donated generously to Catholic Charities over the years.

Pérez Companc and his wife raised Jersey dairy cows and operated Munchi's, a small chain of ice cream parlors. Long known for his love of modern and vintage cars, he reportedly owned a Bugatti, a Maserati, a limited-edition Ferrari F50, and the unique Ferrari 330 TRI/LM racing car.

Gregorio Pérez Companc died on 14 June 2024, at the age of 89.

== See also ==
- Eduardo Eurnekian
- Ernestina Herrera de Noble
- María Amalia Lacroze de Fortabat
- Roberto Rocca
