= 2007 Masters of Formula 3 =

Race details
Date	5 August 2007
Official name	Zandvoort Masters of Formula 3 @ Zolder
Location	Zolder, Belgium
Course	3.977 km (2.471 mi)
Distance	28 laps, 111.356 km (69.193 mi)

Pole
Driver	(France) Romain Grosjean	ASM Formule 3
Time	1:23.631

Fastest Lap
Driver	(United Kingdom) James Jakes	Manor Motorsport
Time	1:25.680 (on lap 24 of 28)

Podium
First	(Germany) Nico Hülkenberg	ASM Formule 3
Second	(France) Yann Clairay	Signature Plus
Third	(France) Jean Karl Vernay	Signature Plus

The 2007 Zandvoort Masters of Formula 3 @ Zolder was the seventeenth Masters of Formula 3 race held at Zolder on 5 August 2007. It was won by Nico Hülkenberg, for ASM Formule 3.

== Drivers and teams ==
2007 Entry List
Team	No	Driver	Chassis	Engine	Main series
(France) ASM Formule 3	1	(France) Romain Grosjean	Dallara F305	Mercedes	Formula 3 Euro Series
(France) ASM Formule 3	2	(Germany) Nico Hülkenberg	Dallara F305	Mercedes	Formula 3 Euro Series
(France) ASM Formule 3	3	(France) Tom Dillmann	Dallara F307	Mercedes	Formula 3 Euro Series
(France) ASM Formule 3	4	(Japan) Kamui Kobayashi	Dallara F305	Mercedes	Formula 3 Euro Series
(Germany) ASL Mücke Motorsport	5	(Italy) Edoardo Piscopo	Dallara F305	Mercedes	Formula 3 Euro Series
(Germany) ASL Mücke Motorsport	6	(New Zealand) Brendon Hartley	Dallara F305	Mercedes	Formula 3 Euro Series
(United Kingdom) Manor Motorsport	7	(Netherlands) Yelmer Buurman	Dallara F305	Mercedes	Formula 3 Euro Series
(United Kingdom) Manor Motorsport	8	(United Kingdom) James Jakes	Dallara F305	Mercedes	Formula 3 Euro Series
(United Kingdom) Manor Motorsport	9	(China) Cong Fu Cheng	Dallara F306	Mercedes	Formula 3 Euro Series
(United Kingdom) Manor Motorsport	10	(France) Franck Mailleux	Dallara F305	Mercedes	Formula 3 Euro Series
(Switzerland) Jo Zeller Racing	12	(Germany) Tim Sandtler	Dallara F306	Mercedes	Formula 3 Euro Series
(France) Signature Plus	14	(Italy) Edoardo Mortara	Dallara F305	Mercedes	Formula 3 Euro Series
(France) Signature Plus	15	(Spain) Dani Clos	Dallara F305	Mercedes	Formula 3 Euro Series
(France) Signature Plus	16	(France) Yann Clairay	Dallara F305	Mercedes	Formula 3 Euro Series
(France) Signature Plus	17	(France) Jean Karl Vernay	Dallara F306	Mercedes	Formula 3 Euro Series
(United Kingdom) Hitech Racing	19	(Estonia) Marko Asmer	Dallara F305	Mercedes	British Formula 3
(United Kingdom) Hitech Racing	20	(Austria) Walter Grubmüller	Dallara F305	Mercedes	British Formula 3
(Italy) Prema Powerteam	21	(Australia) Michael Patrizi	Dallara F306	Mercedes	Formula 3 Euro Series
(Italy) Prema Powerteam	22	(Netherlands) Renger van der Zande	Dallara F305	Mercedes	Formula 3 Euro Series
(Austria) HBR Motorsport	23	(Russia) Sergey Afanasyev	Dallara F305	Mercedes	Formula 3 Euro Series
(Austria) HBR Motorsport	24	(Czech Republic) Filip Salaquarda	Dallara F306	Mercedes	Formula 3 Euro Series
(Austria) HBR Motorsport	25	(Macau) Rodolfo Ávila	Dallara F306	Mercedes	International Formula Master
(United Kingdom) Ultimate Motorsport	26	(Argentina) Esteban Guerrieri	Mygale M07	Mercedes	British Formula 3
(United Kingdom) Ultimate Motorsport	27	(Republic of Ireland) Michael Devaney	Dallara F305	Mercedes	British Formula 3
(United Kingdom) Alan Docking Racing	28	(Italy) Francesco Castellacci	Dallara F305	Mugen-Honda	British Formula 3
(United Kingdom) Alan Docking Racing	29	(Australia) John Martin	Dallara F305	Mugen-Honda	British Formula 3
(Sweden) Performance Racing Europe	31	(Angola) Ricardo Teixeira	Dallara F305	Mugen-Honda	British Formula 3
(Austria) HS Technik Motorsport	32	(Latvia) Harald Schlegelmilch	Dallara F305	Mercedes	Formula 3 Euro Series
(United Kingdom) Räikkönen Robertson Racing	34	(United Kingdom) Stephen Jelley	Dallara F306	Mercedes	British Formula 3
(United Kingdom) Räikkönen Robertson Racing	35	(Finland) Atte Mustonen	Dallara F306	Mercedes	British Formula 3
(United Kingdom) Räikkönen Robertson Racing	36	(United Kingdom) Ali Jackson	Dallara F306	Mercedes	British Formula 3
(United Kingdom) Räikkönen Robertson Racing	37	(United Kingdom) Jonathan Kennard	Dallara F306	Mercedes	British Formula 3
(United Kingdom) Carlin Motorsport	38	(United Kingdom) Sam Bird	Dallara F305	Mercedes	British Formula 3
(United Kingdom) Carlin Motorsport	39	(Germany) Maro Engel	Dallara F305	Mercedes	British Formula 3
(United Kingdom) Carlin Motorsport	40	(Republic of Ireland) Niall Breen	Dallara F305	Mercedes	British Formula 3
(United Kingdom) Carlin Motorsport	41	(Brazil) Alberto Valerio	Dallara F305	Mercedes	British Formula 3

== Classification ==
=== Qualifying 1 ===
Group A drivers are highlighted in green.

==== Even numbers ====
Pos	No	Name	Team	Time
1	2	(Germany) Nico Hülkenberg	ASM Formule 3	1:23.690
2	10	(France) Franck Mailleux	Manor Motorsport	1:24.190
3	32	(Latvia) Harald Schlegelmilch	HS Technik Motorsport	1:24.406
4	4	(Japan) Kamui Kobayashi	ASM Formule 3	1:24.423
5	22	(Netherlands) Renger van der Zande	Prema Powerteam	1:24.430
6	6	(New Zealand) Brendon Hartley	ASL Mücke Motorsport	1:24.448
7	16	(France) Yann Clairay	Signature Plus	1:24.610
8	14	(Italy) Edoardo Mortara	Signature Plus	1:24.708
9	38	(United Kingdom) Sam Bird	Carlin Motorsport	1:24.871
10	24	(Czech Republic) Filip Salaquarda	HBR Motorsport	1:24.915
11	34	(United Kingdom) Stephen Jelley	Räikkönen Robertson Racing	1:24.999
12	26	(Argentina) Esteban Guerrieri	Ultimate Motorsport	1:25.075
13	40	(Republic of Ireland) Niall Breen	Carlin Motorsport	1:25.234
14	12	(Germany) Tim Sandtler	Jo Zeller Racing	1:25.355
15	8	(United Kingdom) James Jakes	Manor Motorsport	1:25.788
16	20	(Austria) Walter Grubmüller	Hitech Racing	1:25.820
17	36	(United Kingdom) Ali Jackson	Räikkönen Robertson Racing	1:25.996
18	28	(Italy) Francesco Castellacci	Alan Docking Racing	1:26.690

==== Odd numbers ====
Pos	No	Name	Team	Time
1	3	(France) Tom Dillmann	ASM Formule 3	1:23.906
2	1	(France) Romain Grosjean	ASM Formule 3	1:24.028
3	7	(Netherlands) Yelmer Buurman	Manor Motorsport	1:24.240
4	19	(Estonia) Marko Asmer	Hitech Racing	1:24.415
5	5	(Italy) Edoardo Piscopo	Prema Powerteam	1:24.436
6	35	(Finland) Atte Mustonen	Räikkönen Robertson Racing	1:24.446
7	15	(Spain) Dani Clos	Signature Plus	1:24.578
8	17	(France) Jean Karl Vernay	Signature Plus	1:24.654
9	39	(Germany) Maro Engel	Carlin Motorsport	1:24.922
10	37	(United Kingdom) Jonathan Kennard	Räikkönen Robertson Racing	1:25.096
11	9	(China) Cong Fu Cheng	Manor Motorsport	1:25.156
12	21	(Australia) Michael Patrizi	Prema Powerteam	1:25.386
13	27	(Republic of Ireland) Michael Devaney	Ultimate Motorsport	1:25.757
14	29	(Australia) John Martin	Alan Docking Racing	1:25.993
15	23	(Russia) Sergey Afanasyev	HBR Motorsport	1:26.218
16	41	(Brazil) Alberto Valerio	Carlin Motorsport	1:27.319
17	25	(Macau) Rodolfo Ávila	HBR Motorsport	1:27.452
18	31	(Angola) Ricardo Teixeira	Performance Racing Europe	1:28.146

=== Qualifying 2 ===
==== Group A ====
Pos	No	Name	Team	Time
1	1	(France) Romain Grosjean	ASM Formule 3	1:23.631
2	10	(France) Franck Mailleux	Manor Motorsport	1:23.738
3	2	(Germany) Nico Hülkenberg	ASM Formule 3	1:23.780
4	17	(France) Jean Karl Vernay	Signature Plus	1:23.944
5	16	(France) Yann Clairay	Signature Plus	1:23.948
6	6	(New Zealand) Brendon Hartley	ASL Mücke Motorsport	1:23.975
7	22	(Netherlands) Renger van der Zande	Prema Powerteam	1:24.000
8	5	(Italy) Edoardo Piscopo	ASL Mücke Motorsport	1:24.160
9	14	(Italy) Edoardo Mortara	Signature Plus	1:24.213
10	7	(Netherlands) Yelmer Buurman	Manor Motorsport	1:24.252
11	32	(Latvia) Harald Schlegelmilch	HS Technik Motorsport	1:24.332
12	3	(France) Tom Dillmann	ASM Formule 3	1:24.341
13	37	(United Kingdom) Jonathan Kennard	Räikkönen Robertson Racing	1:24.376
14	39	(Germany) Maro Engel	Carlin Motorsport	1:24.386
15	15	(Spain) Dani Clos	Signature Plus	1:24.403
16	19	(Estonia) Marko Asmer	Hitech Racing	1:24.473
17	38	(United Kingdom) Sam Bird	Carlin Motorsport	1:24.560
18	35	(Finland) Atte Mustonen	Räikkönen Robertson Racing	1:24.609
19	4	(Japan) Kamui Kobayashi	ASM Formule 3	1:24.636
20	24	(Czech Republic) Filip Salaquarda	HBR Motorsport	1:25.295

==== Group B ====
Pos	No	Name	Team	Time
1	8	(United Kingdom) James Jakes	Manor Motorsport	1:24.321
2	26	(Argentina) Esteban Guerrieri	Ultimate Motorsport	1:24.743
3	23	(Russia) Sergey Afanasyev	HBR Motorsport	1:24.874
4	21	(Australia) Michael Patrizi	Prema Powerteam	1:24.877
5	41	(Brazil) Alberto Valerio	Carlin Motorsport	1:24.901
6	34	(United Kingdom) Stephen Jelley	Räikkönen Robertson Racing	1:24.981
7	9	(China) Cong Fu Cheng	Manor Motorsport	1:25.079
8	29	(Australia) John Martin	Alan Docking Racing	1:25.140
9	40	(Republic of Ireland) Niall Breen	Carlin Motorsport	1:25.325
10	12	(Germany) Tim Sandtler	Jo Zeller Racing	1:25.489
11	20	(Austria) Walter Grubmüller	Hitech Racing	1:26.039
12	27	(Republic of Ireland) Michael Devaney	Ultimate Motorsport	1:26.042
13	25	(Macau) Rodolfo Ávila	HBR Motorsport	1:26.119
14	28	(Italy) Francesco Castellacci	Alan Docking Racing	1:26.342
15	36	(United Kingdom) Ali Jackson	Räikkönen Robertson Racing	1:27.291
16	31	(Angola) Ricardo Teixeira	Performance Racing Europe	1:27.428

=== Starting grid ===
1	(France) Romain Grosjean	ASM Formule 3	2	(France) Franck Mailleux	Manor Motorsport
3	(Germany) Nico Hülkenberg	ASM Formule 3	4	(France) Jean Karl Vernay	Signature Plus
5	(France) Yann Clairay	Signature Plus	6	(New Zealand) Brendon Hartley	ASL Mücke Motorsport
7	(Netherlands) Renger van der Zande	Prema Powerteam	8	(Italy) Edoardo Piscopo	ASL Mücke Motorsport
9	(Italy) Edoardo Mortara	Signature Plus	10	(Netherlands) Yelmer Buurman	Manor Motorsport
11	(Latvia) Harald Schlegelmilch	HS Technik Motorsport	12	(France) Tom Dillmann	ASM Formule 3
13	(United Kingdom) Jonathan Kennard	Räikkönen Robertson Racing	14	(Germany) Maro Engel	Carlin Motorsport
15	(Spain) Dani Clos	Signature Plus	16	(Estonia) Marko Asmer	Hitech Racing
17	(United Kingdom) Sam Bird	Carlin Motorsport	18	(Finland) Atte Mustonen	Räikkönen Robertson Racing
19	(Japan) Kamui Kobayashi	ASM Formule 3	20	(Czech Republic) Filip Salaquarda	HBR Motorsport
21	(United Kingdom) James Jakes	Manor Motorsport	22	(Argentina) Esteban Guerrieri	Ultimate Motorsport
23	(Russia) Sergey Afanasyev	HBR Motorsport	24	(Australia) Michael Patrizi	Prema Powerteam
25	(Brazil) Alberto Valerio	Carlin Motorsport	26	(United Kingdom) Stephen Jelley	Räikkönen Robertson Racing
27	(China) Cong Fu Cheng	Manor Motorsport	28	(Australia) John Martin	Alan Docking Racing
29	(Republic of Ireland) Niall Breen	Carlin Motorsport	30	(Germany) Tim Sandtler	Jo Zeller Racing
31	(Austria) Walter Grubmüller	Hitech Racing	32	(Republic of Ireland) Michael Devaney	Ultimate Motorsport
33	(Macau) Rodolfo Ávila	HBR Motorsport	34	(Italy) Francesco Castellacci	Alan Docking Racing
35	(United Kingdom) Ali Jackson	Räikkönen Robertson Racing	36	(Angola) Ricardo Teixeira	Performance Racing Europe

=== Race ===
Pos	No	Driver	Team	Laps	Time/Retired	Grid
1	2	(Germany) Nico Hülkenberg	ASM Formule 3	28	40:45.974	3
2	16	(France) Yann Clairay	Signature Plus	28	+6.690	5
3	17	(France) Jean Karl Vernay	Signature Plus	28	+7.385	4
4	6	(New Zealand) Brendon Hartley	ASL Mücke Motorsport	28	+7.662	6
5	5	(Italy) Edoardo Piscopo	ASL Mücke Motorsport	28	+12.166	8
6	14	(Italy) Edoardo Mortara	Signature Plus	28	12.881	9
7	7	(Netherlands) Yelmer Buurman	Manor Motorsport	28	+15.140	10
8	32	(Latvia) Harald Schlegelmilch	HS Technik Motorsport	28	+15.356	11
9	22	(Netherlands) Renger van der Zande	Prema Powerteam	28	+19.680	7
10	19	(Estonia) Marko Asmer	Hitech Racing	28	+21.887	16
11	35	(Finland) Atte Mustonen	Räikkönen Robertson Racing	28	+29.278	18
12	12	(Germany) Tim Sandtler	Jo Zeller Racing	28	+36.507	30
13	39	(Germany) Maro Engel	Carlin Motorsport	28	+37.323	14
14	1	(France) Romain Grosjean	ASM Formule 3	28	+38.162	1
15	15	(Spain) Dani Clos	Signature Plus	28	+42.772	15
16	24	(Czech Republic) Filip Salaquarda	HBR Motorsport	28	+45.716	20
17	10	(France) Franck Mailleux	Manor Motorsport	28	+46.121	2
18	26	(Argentina) Esteban Guerrieri	Ultimate Motorsport	28	+49.250	22
19	9	(China) Cong Fu Cheng	Manor Motorsport	28	+53.867	27
20	37	(United Kingdom) Jonathan Kennard	Räikkönen Robertson Racing	28	+1:00.789	31
21	8	(United Kingdom) James Jakes	Manor Motorsport	28	+1:09.153	21
22	36	(United Kingdom) Ali Jackson	Räikkönen Robertson Racing	27	+1 lap	35
23	34	(United Kingdom) Stephen Jelley	Räikkönen Robertson Racing	27	+1 lap	26
24	31	(Angola) Ricardo Teixeira	Performance Racing Europe	27	+1 lap	36
25	25	(Macau) Rodolfo Ávila	HBR Motorsport	27	+1 lap	33
26	28	(Italy) Francesco Castellacci	Alan Docking Racing	27	+1 lap	34
27	38	(United Kingdom) Sam Bird	Carlin Motorsport	27	+1 lap	17
28	29	(Australia) John Martin	Alan Docking Racing	26	+2 laps	28
29	41	(Brazil) Alberto Valerio	Carlin Motorsport	24	+3 laps	25
Ret	40	(Republic of Ireland) Niall Breen	Carlin Motorsport	17	Retired	29
Ret	23	(Russia) Sergey Afanasyev	HBR Motorsport	16	Retired	23
Ret	20	(Austria) Walter Grubmüller	Hitech Racing	13	Retired	31
Ret	27	(Republic of Ireland) Michael Devaney	Ultimate Motorsport	3	Retired	32
Ret	3	(France) Tom Dillmann	ASM Formule 3	0	Retired	12
Ret	4	(Japan) Kamui Kobayashi	ASM Formule 3	0	Retired	19
DNS	21	(Australia) Michael Patrizi	Prema Powerteam	0	Did not start	24
Fastest lap: James Jakes, 1:25.680, 167.101 km/h (103.832 mph) on lap 24

== See also ==
- 2007 Formula 3 Euro Series season
- 2007 British Formula 3 season
