= Sean Guthrie =

American racing driver (born 1988)

- Nationality: (United States) American
- Born: April 18, 1988 (age 38) Albuquerque, New Mexico, U.S.
- Relatives: Jim Guthrie (father)

NASCAR K&N Pro Series West career
- Debut season: 2012
- Starts: 1
- Wins: 0
- Poles: 0

Previous series
- 2006-2010 2005 2004: Firestone Indy Lights; Star Mazda Championship; SCCA Formula Ford

Sean Guthrie (born April 18, 1988) is an American racing driver from Albuquerque, New Mexico. The son of former IndyCar Series driver Jim Guthrie, he is a former Firestone Indy Lights driver and formerly competed part-time in the NASCAR K&N Pro Series West.

== Career ==
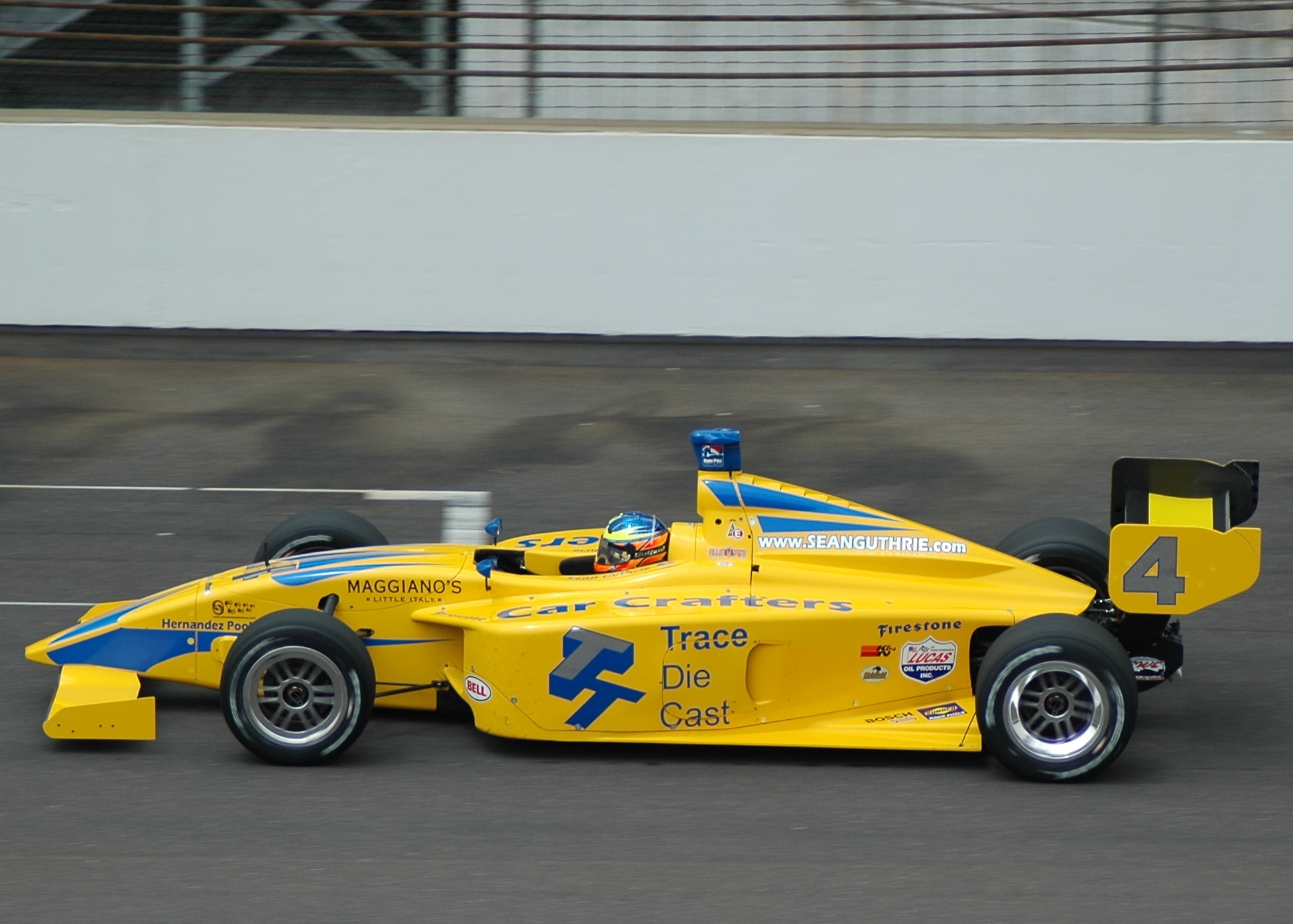
Guthrie racing in the 2007 Freedom 100

Guthrie began his karting career at the age of eight. He won an IKF championship in 2002 and the SKUSA Long Track Nationals in 2003 and moved up to cars in SCCA Formula Ford in 2004. In 2005, he moved up to the Star Mazda Series and finished fourteenth in points in a season beset by mechanical problems. The team, owned by his father, decided to move up to the Indy Pro Series in 2006, but Sean was forced to miss the first three races of the season as he was not yet the league-mandated eighteen years old. He competed in five races with a best finish of fifth at Kentucky Speedway. The team returned for 2007 for a full season. After crashing out of the first three races of the season, the team regrouped and finished the Freedom 100 and Sean registered a career-best fourth place finish at the Milwaukee Mile a week later. In the Iowa Speedway race, Guthrie suffered a heavy crash and the team's car had to be sent back to the manufacturer Dallara in Italy for repairs. Sean injured both his foot and knee in the accident. Guthrie made three starts at the end of the season for Playa Del Racing as the team ran in cooperation with Guthrie. Until his suspension in April 2009, he drove for his father's team Guthrie Racing along with teammates Alistair Jackson and Jesse Mason. Sean finished fourteenth in the 2007 championship and returned to the series, now called the Firestone Indy Lights Series in 2008, finishing tenth in points. In April 2009, he was suspended from the Indy Racing League after the race at Kansas Speedway in which he was penalized for driving through an accident zone too quickly and passing a car under the yellow flag and then refused to respond to the black flag. He made his return to the Firestone Indy Lights Series on October 9, 2009, at Homestead with Andersen Racing. After participating in dirt track racing throughout 2010, Guthrie again returned to Indy Lights for the season finale at Homestead with Andersen, finishing tenth.

After driving in drifting for the 2011 season, Guthrie returned to professional motorsports in 2012, driving in the NASCAR K&N Pro Series West at NAPA Speedway in late September, finishing 22nd and last in his debut in the series.

== Racing record ==
=== Indy Lights ===
Year	Team	1	2	3	4	5	6	7	8	9	10	11	12	13	14	15	16	Rank	Points
2006	Guthrie Racing	HMS	STP1	STP2	INDY; 11	WGL; 16	IMS	NSH; 8	MIL	KTY; 5	SNM1	SNM2	CHI; 18					18th	99
2007	Guthrie Racing Playa Del Racing	HMS; 19	STP1; 16	STP2; 23	INDY; 19	MIL; 4	IMS1; 13	IMS2; 12	IOW; 20	WGL1; 15	WGL2; 16	NSH; 14	MOH; 12	KTY; 6	SNM1; 12	SNM2; 13	CHI; 6	14th	274
2008	Guthrie Racing	HMS; 11	STP1; 15	STP2; 5	KAN; 6	INDY; 12	MIL; 10	IOW; 20	WGL1; 13	WGL2; 10	NSH; 8	MOH1; 13	MOH2; 7	KTY; 7	SNM1; 13	SNM2; 9	CHI; 17	10th	322
2009	Guthrie Meyer Racing	STP1; 22	STP2; 12	LBH; 22	KAN; 18	INDY	MIL	IOW	WGL	TOR	EDM	KTY	MOH	SNM	CHI			27th	65
2009	RLR Andersen Racing															HMS; 11		27th	65
2010	Andersen Racing	STP	ALA	LBH	INDY	IOW	WGL	TOR	EDM	MOH	SNM	CHI	KTY	HMS; 10				30th	20
