= Phil Giebler =

American racing driver

Philip Giebler
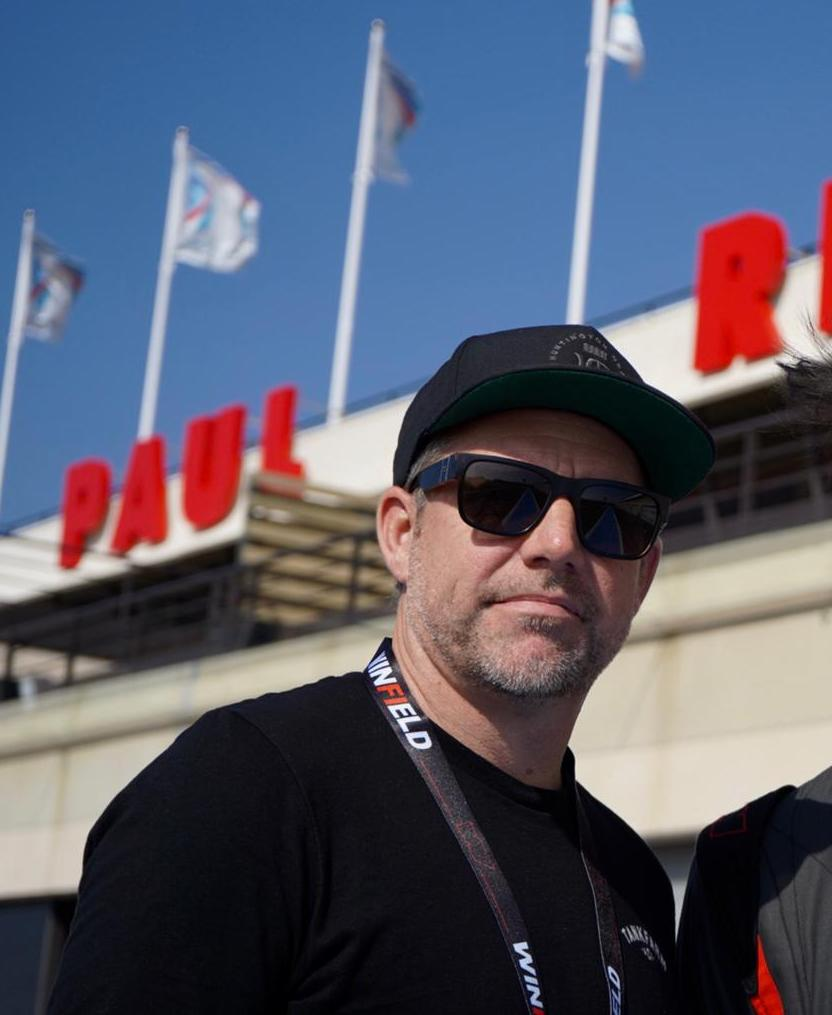
- Giebler in 2018
- Nationality: (United States) American
- Born: Philip Everett Giebler; March 5, 1979 (age 47) Oxnard, California, U.S.

Indy Pro Series
- Categorisation: FIA Gold (until 2013); FIA Silver (2014–)
- Years active: 2004-2007
- Teams: Playa Del Racing; Vision Racing; Guthrie Racing; Kenn Hardley Racing; AFS Racing
- Starts: 19
- Wins: 1
- Poles: 0
- Best finish: 9th in 2004

Previous series
- 2003 2005-2006: Formula 3000; A1 Grand Prix

Awards
- 2007 2000: Indianapolis 500 Rookie of the Year; Team USA Scholarship

Philip Everett Giebler (born March 5, 1979, in Oxnard, California) is an American race car driver.

Giebler was considered a top American prospect with an opportunity to race in Formula One early in his career. Following years in various Formula Three ranks, Giebler ran in Formula 3000 in 2003 half the season putting up a number of good results. He returned stateside in 2004 running in the Infiniti Pro Series and Toyota Atlantic, capturing a win in his IPS debut at Homestead-Miami Speedway, before being named as one of A1 Grand Prix A1 Team USA's drivers. He competed in the 2005-2006 season, and the early part of the 2006-2007 season before being replaced by Jonathan Summerton.

Driving for Playa Del Racing, Giebler qualified for the last starting position and was one of two rookie drivers (Milka Duno being the other) to race in the 2007 Indianapolis 500, but crashed and finished 29th. Despite this, he was the recipient of the Indianapolis 500 Rookie of the Year award for 2007.

For 2008, Giebler unsuccessfully attempted to qualify for the Indianapolis 500 with the same team, now known as American Dream Motorsports.

== Racing record ==
=== Complete International Formula 3000 results ===
(key) (Races in bold indicate pole position; races in italics indicate fastest lap.)

Year	Entrant	1	2	3	4	5	6	7	8	9	10	DC	Points
2003	Den Blå Avis	IMO	CAT; Ret	A1R; 8	MON; Ret	NUR; 9	MAG; DNS	SIL	HOC	HUN	MNZ	17th	1

=== American open–wheel racing results ===
(key)

==== Indy Lights ====
Year	Team	1	2	3	4	5	6	7	8	9	10	11	12	13	14	15	16	Rank	Points
2004	Keith Duesenberg Racing	HMS; 1	PHX; 7	INDY; 5	KAN	NSH	MIL	MIS; 5	KTY; 10	PPIR; 8	CHI	FON; 3	TXS					9th	215
2005	Vision Racing	HMS	PHX	STP	INDY	TXS	IMS	NSH	MIL	KTY	PPIR	SNM	CHI	WGL; 6	FON			22nd	28
2006	Guthrie Racing	HMS	STP1	STP2	INDY; 16													21st	75
2006	Kenn Hardley Racing					WGL; 3												21st	75
2006	AFS Racing						IMS; 7	NSH	MIL	KTY	SNM1	SNM2	CHI					21st	75
2007	Playa Del Racing	HMS	STP1; 24	STP2; 7	INDY	MIL	IMS1; 12	IMS2; 15	IOW	WGL1; 4	WGL2; 4	NSH	MOH	KTY	SNM1; 14	SNM2; 12	CHI	20th	163

==== Atlantic Championship ====
Year	Team	1	2	3	4	5	6	7	8	9	10	11	12	Rank	Points
2005	Condor Motorsports	LBH	MTY	POR1	POR2	CLE1	CLE2	TOR	EDM	SJO; 8	DEN	ROA	MTL	**20th**	**15**
2006	Gelles Racing	LBH	HOU	MTY	POR	CLE1	CLE2	TOR	EDM	SJO; 11	DEN	MTL	ROA	**33rd**	**10**

==== IndyCar Series ====
IndyCar Series results
Year	Team	No.	Chassis	Engine	1	2	3	4	5	6	7	8	9	10	11	12	13	14	15	16	17	18	19	Rank	Points	Ref
2007	Playa Del Racing	31	Panoz	Honda	HMS	STP	MOT	KAN	INDY; 29	MIL	TXS	IOW	RIR	WGL	NSH	MOH	MIS	KTY	SNM	DET	CHI			34th	10	
2008	American Dream Motorsports	88	Panoz	Honda	HMS	STP	MOT^{1}	LBH^{1}	KAN	INDY; DNQ	MIL	TXS	IOW	RIR	WGL	NSH	MOH	EDM	KTY	SNM	DET	CHI	SRF^{2}	NC	0	

^{1} Run on same day.
^{2} Non-points-paying, exhibition race.

===== Indianapolis 500 =====
Year	Chassis	Engine	Start	Finish	Team
2007	Panoz	Honda	33	29	Playa Del Racing
2008	Panoz	Honda	DNQ		American Dream Motorsports

=== Complete A1 Grand Prix results ===
(key) (Races in bold indicate pole position) (Races in italics indicate fastest lap)

Year	Entrant	1	2	3	4	5	6	7	8	9	10	11	12	13	14	15	16	17	18	19	20	21	22	DC	Points
2005–06	USA	GBR; SPR	GBR; FEA	GER; SPR	GER; FEA	POR; SPR	POR; FEA	AUS; SPR	AUS; FEA	MYS; SPR	MYS; FEA	UAE; SPR; 13	UAE; FEA; Ret	RSA; SPR; 13	RSA; FEA; Ret	IDN; SPR; 15	IDN; FEA; 9	MEX; SPR	MEX; FEA	USA; SPR	USA; FEA	CHN; SPR; 14	CHN; FEA; 10	16th	23
2006–07	USA	NED; SPR; 7	NED; FEA; 2	CZE; SPR; 6	CZE; FEA; 17	BEI; SPR; 11	BEI; FEA; Ret	MYS; SPR; 9	MYS; FEA; 6	IDN; SPR; 4	IDN; FEA; 9	NZL; SPR	NZL; FEA	AUS; SPR; 8	AUS; FEA; 8	RSA; SPR	RSA; FEA	MEX; SPR	MEX; FEA	SHA; SPR	SHA; FEA	GBR; SPR	GBR; SPR	9th	42

Awards and achievements
Preceded by Marco Andretti	Indianapolis 500; Rookie of the Year; 2007	Succeeded by Ryan Hunter-Reay
