= American Dream Motorsports =

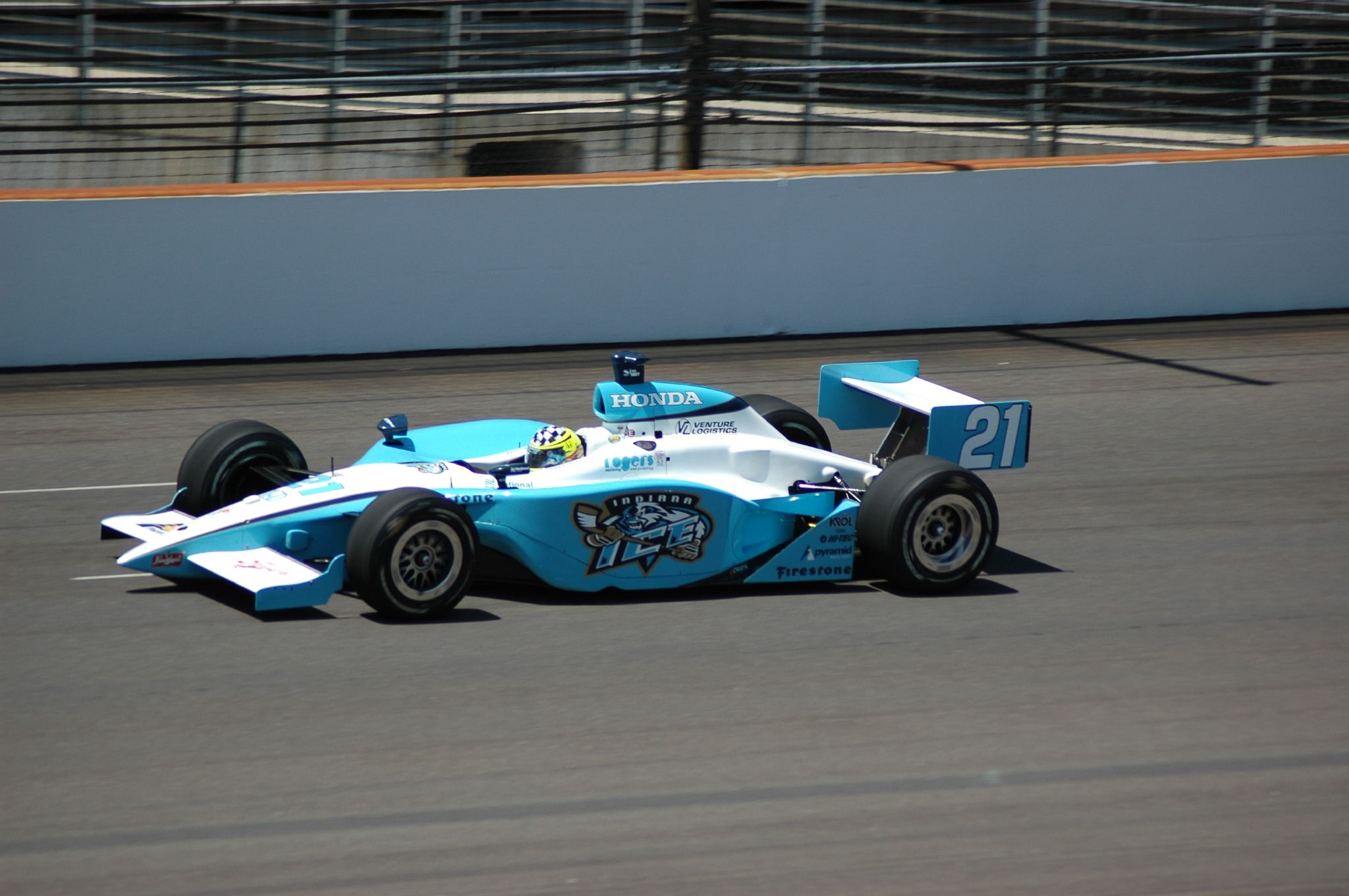
Jaques Lazier during 2007 Indianapolis 500 practice

American Dream Motorsports was a racing team that competed in the Indy Racing League's Indy Lights series and the IndyCar Series' Indianapolis 500 owned by Eric Zimmerman and William T. Kelsey. Until May 2008 it was known as Playa Del Racing and was owned by Jeff Brougher, Ernie Moody, Gary Sallee, and Susan Schafer.

== 2005 to 2007 ==
The team was formed in 2005 and fielded a Panoz-Toyota for Jaques Lazier in the 2005 Indianapolis 500. The team returned in 2006 and co-owner Jon Herb was to join Lazier in a second car, but he was unable to find speed and was replaced with veteran Roger Yasukawa. Herb subsequently parted ways with the other owners and re-formed his own team, Racing Professionals.

PDR fielded an Indy Pro Series car in the 2007 season starting with rookie A. J. Russell at Miami. After his poor showing, the team used Al Unser III for four summertime oval events and Phil Giebler for eight road-course events with modest success from each and also fielded a car for Sean Guthrie when his Guthrie Racing car was unavailable due to crash damage.

Playa Del Racing entered two cars into the 2007 Indianapolis 500 driven by former IndyCar race winner Jaques Lazier and one of their IPS drivers, the young American Phil Giebler. Both ended up crashing out of the race, but Giebler managed to capture the 2007 Indy 500 Rookie of the Year title.

== 2008 ==
For 2008, Playa Del Racing announced it would compete in a full season in the development IRL Firestone Indy Lights Series (formerly the Indy Pro Series) with Al Unser III as their full-time driver, thanks to sponsorship from Ethos Fuel Reformulator. On May 2, 2008 it was announced that the team had been purchased by William T. Kelsey and Eric Zimmerman and that Phil Giebler would return to the team to drive its entry in the 2008 Indianapolis 500. Giebler crashed the team's Panoz during practice on the third day of qualifying, totaling the car as well as suffering bruised lungs and a cervical sprain. The team had planned to run the Bombardier Learjet 550 at Texas Motor Speedway in June with a new Dallara chassis and Jaques Lazier behind the wheel. However, an entry for the team was not on the entry list posted by the league on June 3. The team's Indy Lights entry also failed to arrive at the first race after the Freedom 100 with no official reason as to why. In an interview on July 4, 2008, Al Unser Jr. indicated that the team had gone bankrupt and that he and the team's sponsor were seeking to acquire the team's assets in bankruptcy court. The team's Indy Lights equipment was ultimately sold to Bryan Herta, who used it to begin his own team.

== IndyCar drivers ==
- Jaques Lazier (2005–2007)
- Roger Yasukawa (2006)
- Phil Giebler (2007)

== Racing results ==
=== Complete IRL IndyCar Series results ===
(key)

Year	Chassis	Engine	Drivers	No.	1	2	3	4	5	6	7	8	9	10	11	12	13	14	15	16	17	18	19
2005					HMS	PHX	STP	MOT	INDY	TXS	RIR	KAN	NSH	MIL	MCH	KTY	PPIR	SNM	CHI	WGL	FON		
2005	Panoz GF09C	Toyota Indy V8	(United States) Jaques Lazier	21					16														
2006					HMS	STP	MOT	INDY	WGL	TXS	RIR	KAN	NSH	MIL	MCH	KTY	SNM	CHI					
2006	Panoz GF09C	Honda HI6R V8	(United States) Jon Herb	12				DNQ															
2006	Panoz GF09C	Honda HI6R V8	(United States) Roger Yasukawa	12				16															
2006	Panoz GF09C	Honda HI6R V8	(United States) Jaques Lazier	21				17															
2007					HMS	STP	MOT	KAN	INDY	MIL	TXS	IOW	RIR	WGL	NSH	MOH	MCH	KTY	SNM	DET	CHI		
2007	Panoz GF09C	Honda HI7R V8	(United States) Jaques Lazier	21					27														
2007	Panoz GF09C	Honda HI7R V8	(United States) Phil Giebler	31					29														
2008					HMS	STP	MOT	LBH	KAN	INDY	MIL	TXS	IOW	RIR	WGL	NSH	MOH	EDM	KTY	SNM	DET	CHI	SRF^{1}
2008	Panoz GF09C	Honda HI7R V8	(United States) Phil Giebler	88						DNQ													

1. Non-points-paying, exhibition race.

=== Complete Indy Pro Series / Indy Lights results ===
(key)

Year	Car	Drivers	No.	1	2	3	4	5	6	7	8	9	10	11	12	13	14	15	16	D.C.	Points
2007	Dallara-Nissan			HMS	STP1	STP2	INDY	MIL	IMS1	IMS2	IOW	WGL1	WGL2	NSH	MOH	KTY	SNM1	SNM2	CHI		
2007	Dallara-Nissan	(United States) A. J. Russell	12	23																43rd	7
2007	Dallara-Nissan	(United States) Phil Giebler	12		24	7			12	15		4	4				14	12		20th	163
2007	Dallara-Nissan	(United States) Al Unser III	12				8	7			7			13						26th	93
2007	Dallara-Nissan	(United States) Sean Guthrie	12												12	6			6	18th†	99†
2008	Dallara-Nissan			HMS	STP1	STP2	KAN	INDY	MIL	IOW	WGL1	WGL2	NSH	MOH1	MOH2	KTY	SNM1	SNM2	CHI		
2008	Dallara-Nissan	(United States) Al Unser III	21	13	12	6	10	11												25th	102

† Also drove for Guthrie Racing.
