= Sergey Mokshantsev =

Russian racing driver from Moscow (born 1978)

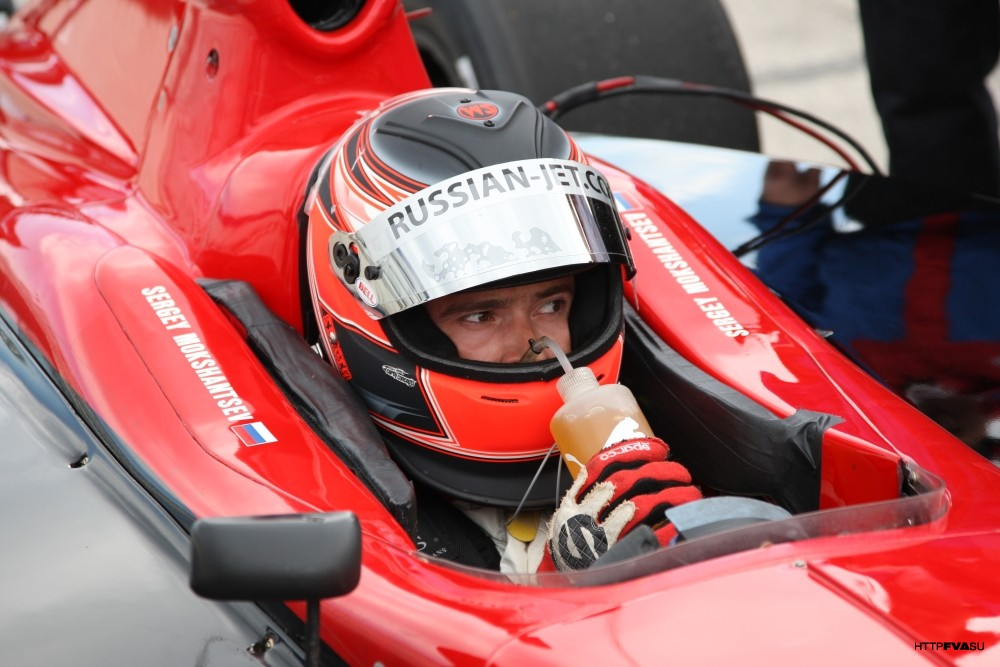
- Nationality: (Russia) Russian
- Born: Sergey Alekseyevich Mokshantsev; 22 January 1978 (age 48) Bendery, Moldavian SSR, Soviet Union

Firestone Indy Lights Series
- Years active: 2009
- Teams: Brian Stewart Racing
- Starts: 8
- Wins: 0
- Poles: 0
- Best finish: 25th in 2009

Previous series
- 2008 2008 2007 2006-2007: Russian Formula Three; International Formula Master; Italian Formula Three; Formula RUS

Sergey Alekseyevich Mokshantsev (born 22 January 1978) is a Russian racing driver from Moscow. After karting, he began his auto racing career in the Formula RUS series in 2006. He continued in the series in 2007 as well as making his debut in the Italian Formula Three Championship. He moved to the Italian Formula Master series in 2008 and competed in two races in the International Formula Master Series as well in addition to completing the Russian Formula Three Championship and placing sixth. In 2009, he signed to compete for Brian Stewart Racing in the Firestone Indy Lights Series, becoming the first Russian driver to compete in an IRL-sanctioned series. After skipping the Freedom 100, he left the series after the Toronto race with a best finish of thirteenth in eight starts.

Released following the 2009 Indy Lights season, Mokshantsev was set to join NTS Motorsports for 2012, switching to stock car racing with plans to run a limited schedule in the NASCAR K&N Pro Series East and Camping World Truck Series in preparation for a full-time Truck Series campaign in 2013, none of which materialized.

== American open-wheel racing results ==
(key) (Races in bold indicate pole position) (Races in italics indicate fastest lap)

=== Indy Lights ===
| Year | Team | 1 | 2 | 3 | 4 | 5 | 6 | 7 | 8 | 9 | 10 | 11 | 12 | 13 | 14 | 15 | Rank | Points | Ref |
|---|---|---|---|---|---|---|---|---|---|---|---|---|---|---|---|---|---|---|---|
| 2009 | Brian Stewart Racing | STP1; 27 | STP2; 14 | LBH; 21 | KAN; 22 | INDY | MIL; 13 | IOW; 17 | WGL; 16 | TOR; 18 | EDM | KTY | MOH | SNM | CHI | HMS | **17th** | **162** | |
