= Juan Pablo García (racing driver) =

Mexican racing driver

- Nationality: (Mexico) Mexican
- Born: October 4, 1987 (age 39) Mexico City

Firestone Indy Lights career
- Debut season: 2009
- Current team: Schmidt Peterson Motorsports
- Car number: 10
- Former teams: Belardi Auto Racing; HVM Racing; Michael Crawford Motorsports; Jensen MotorSport; Jeffrey Mark Motorsports; Team Moore Racing
- Starts: 31
- Wins: 0
- Poles: 0
- Fastest laps: 0
- Best finish: 6th in 2014

Previous series
- 2008 2008 2007 2006–07 2006: Formula Renault 2.0 NEC; Eurocup Formula Renault 2.0; British Formula 3 A1 Grand Prix; Formula Renault 2000 de America

Juan Pablo García (born October 4, 1987) is a Mexican racing driver.

== Racing career ==
=== Early career ===
Garcia began his professional career in Formula Renault 2000 de America in 2006. He made two A1 Grand Prix starts for A1 Team Mexico that winter and then drove in the British Formula 3 Championship National Class, finishing seventh. In 2008, he drove in Formula Renault 2.0 Northern European Cup, finishing 16th, and Formula Renault 2.0 Eurocup where he failed to score.

=== Indy Lights ===
In August 2009, García signed on to make his Indy Lights debut for HVM Racing at Infineon Raceway after being inactive for much of the year. He returned to the team in 2010 and made two late-season road course starts, finishing sixth at Infineon. For 2011, he signed to drive full-time in the series for Jensen MotorSport. However, he left the team and the series after the fourth race of the season, the Freedom 100, with a best finish of eighth. He returned to Indy Lights in 2012 racing with the Jeffrey Mark Motorsports team. Garcia finished ninth in points with a best finish of seventh (twice). He returned to the series in 2013 with Team Moore Racing for ten races, switching to Belardi Auto Racing for the final two races of the season. He finished eighth in points with a best finish of fourth in the season opener at St. Petersburg.

== Racing record ==
=== Complete Eurocup Formula Renault 2.0 results ===
(key) (Races in bold indicate pole position; races in italics indicate fastest lap)

Year	Entrant	1	2	3	4	5	6	7	8	9	10	11	12	13	14	DC	Points
2008	Team Motorpark	SPA; 1; 21	SPA; 2; 17	SIL; 1; 36	SIL; 2; 34	HUN; 1; 18	HUN; 2; 21	NÜR; 1; 20	NÜR; 2; 25	LMS; 1 Ret	LMS; 2; 21	EST; 1; 30	EST; 2; 11	CAT; 1; 26	CAT; 2 Ret	32nd	0

=== Complete Formula Renault 2.0 NEC results ===
(key) (Races in bold indicate pole position) (Races in italics indicate fastest lap)

Year	Entrant	1	2	3	4	5	6	7	8	9	10	11	12	13	14	15	16	DC	Points
2008	MEX Motopark	HOC; 1; 7	HOC; 2; 21	ZAN; 1; 8	ZAN; 2; 6	ALA; 1; 21	ALA; 2; 6	OSC; 1	OSC; 2	ASS; 1; 13	ASS; 2; 7	ZOL; 1; 9	ZOL; 2 Ret	NÜR; 1; 22	NÜR; 2 Ret	SPA; 1; 16	SPA; 2; 13	16th	104

=== American open–wheel racing results ===
(key)

==== Indy Lights ====
Year	Team	1	2	3	4	5	6	7	8	9	10	11	12	13	14	15	Rank	Points	Ref
2009	HVM Racing	STP1	STP2	LBH	KAN	INDY	MIL	IOW	WGL	TOR	EDM	KTY	MOH	SNM; 18	CHI	HMS	31st	12	
2010	Michael Crawford Motorsports	STP	ALA	LBH	INDY	IOW	WGL	TOR	EDM	MOH; 11	SNM; 6	CHI	KTY	HMS			20th	47	
2011	Jensen MotorSport	STP; 12	ALA; 8	LBH; 15	INDY; 16	MIL	IOW	TOR	EDM1	EDM2	TRO	NHM	BAL	KTY	LVS		20th	71	
2012	Jeffrey Mark Motorsport	STP; 7	ALA; 8	LBH; 7	INDY; 11	DET; 9	MIL; 11	IOW; 14	TOR; 8	EDM; 9	TRO; 10	BAL; 9	FON; 10				9th	260	
2013	Team Moore Racing	STP; 4	ALA; 8	LBH; 6	INDY; 9	MIL; 5	IOW; 6	POC; 6	TOR; 5	MOH; 6	BAL; DNS						8th	312	
2013	Belardi Auto Racing											HOU; 8	FON; 6				8th	312	
2014	Schmidt Peterson Motorsports	STP; 7	LBH; 8	ALA; 7	ALA; 6	IND; 6	IND; 6	INDY; 6	POC; 4	TOR; 8	MOH; 10	MOH; 6	MIL; 7	SNM; 4	SNM; 9		6th	372	
