= Marko Asmer =

Estonian racing driver (born 1984)

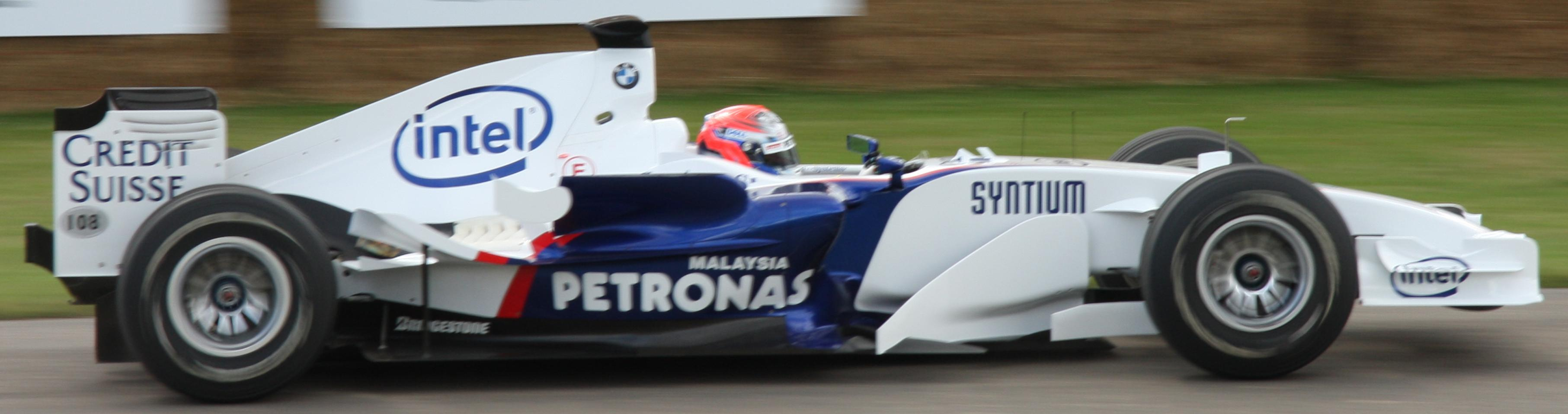
- Asmer demonstrating a BMW Sauber F1.06 at the 2008 Goodwood Festival of Speed.
- Nationality: (Estonia) Estonian
- Born: 30 July 1984 (age 42) Tallinn, then part of Estonian SSR, Soviet Union
- Categorisation: FIA Platinum

Championship titles
- 2007: British F3 Champion

Marko Asmer (born 30 July 1984) is an Estonian former racing driver, who won the British Formula 3 Championship title in 2007. Asmer is also the first Estonian to test a Formula One car, having tested for the Williams BMW team in 2003, after just half a season of car racing in British Formula Ford. Asmer's father is a former racing driver Toivo Asmer, who was Estonian Minister of Regional Affairs between 1999 and 2003.

== Racing career ==
Asmer was born in Tallinn. His father is motorsports promoter, musician and politician Toivo Asmer. He began karting in 1995, aged eleven, and had won the Estonian, Baltic, Finnish and Scandinavian kart championships by 2001. Asmer went on to make his car racing debut in 2003 and raced in British Formula Ford for team JLR. He scored six wins that season and finished in second place in the Formula Ford festival. Apart from a brief participation in the Formula Renault V6 Eurocup in 2003, Asmer's career was henceforth focused on Formula Three in Britain and Japan. He made his British series début in 2004 with Hitech Racing and, apart from a move to Japan in 2006, he has remained with the team in the years since. He became a championship title contender on his return to the British series in 2007, led the points standings for most of the season, and secured the title at Croft with three races remaining. His participations in All-Japan F3 have been confined to one and a half seasons with Three Bond Racing in 2006 and 2007, the latter of which was limited by competing in Britain. In 2008, Asmer was BMW Sauber's second test driver alongside Christian Klien and competed in seven of ten rounds in the GP2 Series for FMS International.

== Retirement ==
Following the conclusion of the 2008 GP2 season, Asmer parted ways with Fisichella Motor Sport and was unable to find a new team in GP2 for the 2009 season. Due to new rules restricting the amount of testing Formula 1 teams could carry out in-season, he also lost his role as test and reserve driver for the BMW Formula 1 Team. With no competitive race seat for the 2009 season, Asmer became a test and reserve driver in Superleague Formula series.

On 8 April 2010, Toivo Asmer, the father of Marko Asmer, announced that Marko had ended his career in motorsport he had no race seat or test/reserve driver role for the 2010 season, and lack of funding meant that his son's career was finished. Despite this, Asmer made a quick return to the cockpit the following week when he tested for the Atech team in a GP3 Series test session in Barcelona.

== Return to competitive racing ==
In February 2011, Asmer returned to motorsport when he tested a British Formula 3 car for the Double R Racing team at Silverstone, during which he set competitive times. Staying with Double R, Asmer finally returned to competitive racing when he competed in the Pau Grand Prix on 21–22 May 2011. Asmer qualified tenth and after a bad start found himself in last place, but showed good race pace and overtaking nous to finish seventh.

Following his return to racing, Asmer was interviewed by Autosport.com and revealed that he had spent his time out of professional motorsport "testing some cars, doing karting and ... doing some driver coaching". He went on to say that he had no firm plans for the future, although he did want to take part in the Macau Grand Prix. Asmer also said that he would welcome a return to racing "if something good comes up", although a full-time return to British F3 would not interest him.

Despite these claims, it was announced on 28 July 2011 that Asmer would return to British Formula 3, again racing a Dallara-Mercedes for the Double R team at the Spa-Francorchamps round. Asmer qualified 18th (of 28 cars) for Race One at Spa, but then scored Double R's best qualifying result of the season, lining up second on the grid for the Feature Race. Asmer failed to finish in Race One or Two, but drove solidly to finish sixth in the Feature Race. However, his status as an invitational driver meant that he was not eligible to score championship points for this weekend. During this weekend, it was also announced that Asmer had sponsorship in place to take part in the 2011 Macau Grand Prix, where he would drive a Dallara-Mercedes for a three-man Double R Racing team, alongside GP3 champion Valtteri Bottas and current GP3 Series racer Mitch Evans.

In an interview with Autosport carried out over the Macau Grand Prix weekend, Asmer reiterated his desire to get back into racing full-time, and said his future may lie in DTM.

== Return to regular racing ==
In recent years, Asmer has returned to actively racing in competitive international motorsport. He raced as part of a four-man team alongside Formula 2 race winner Kazim Vasiliauskas, driving a McLaren MP4-12C GT3 in the 2014 24 Hours of Spa with the GT Russian Team. He also competed in several rounds of the ADAC GT Masters. Asmer continued to race for GT Russian Team, taking part in the 2015 Blancpain GT Series (the successor to FIA GT1 World Championship), with his best result being a seventh-place finish in the main race in the final round in Zandvoort. He also raced in the top A6 category of the Dubai 24 Hour, again for the GT Russia Team.

== Motorsport management ==
Since 2020, Asmer is the manager of Estonian racing driver Jüri Vips.

== Racing record ==
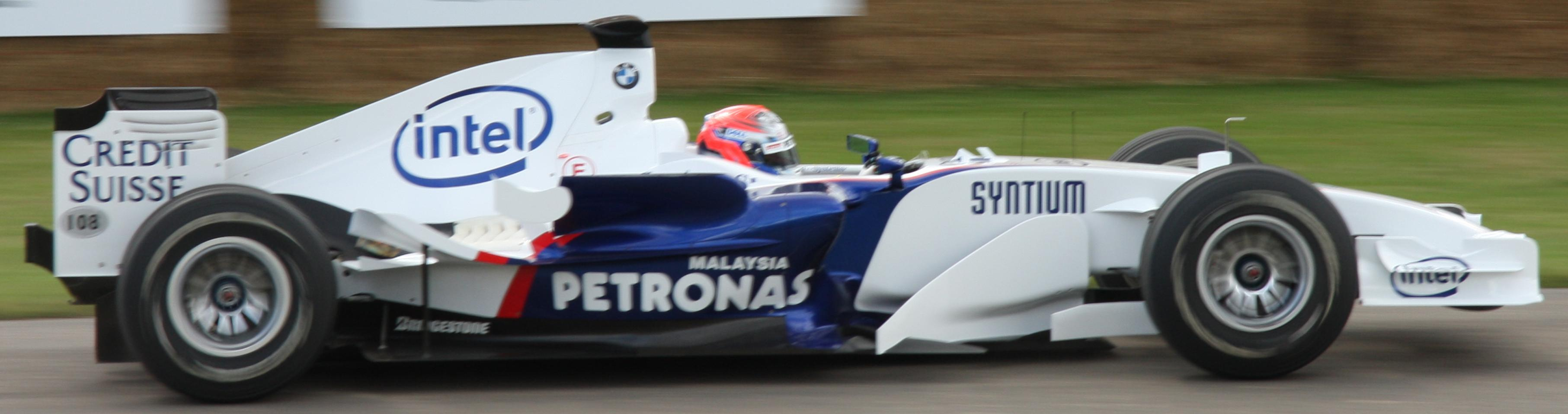
Asmer demonstrating a BMW Sauber F1.06 at the 2008 Goodwood Festival of Speed.

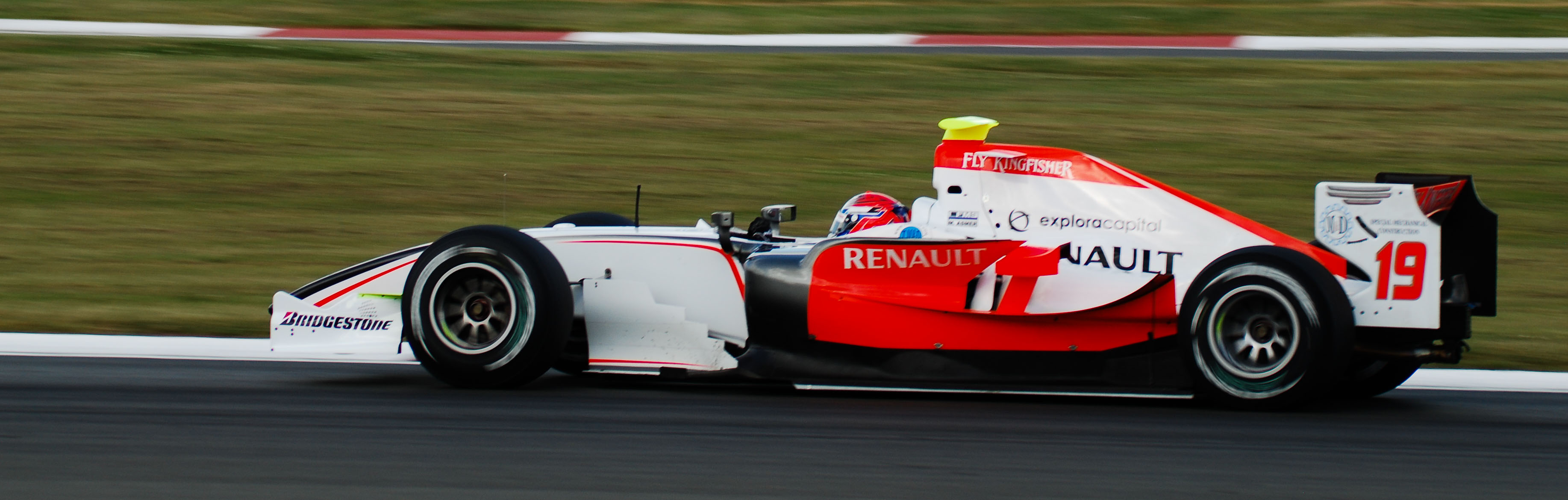
Asmer driving for FMS International at the Silverstone round of the 2008 GP2 Series season.

=== Career summary ===
Season	Series	Team name	Races	Poles	Wins	Points	Position
2003	Formula Renault V6 Eurocup	SRTS	2	0	0	6	19th
2003	British Formula Ford	Panasonic Batteries Racing Team	20	1	2	252	11th
2003	Formula Ford Festival	Hitech Racing	1	0	0	N/A	**2nd**
2004	British Formula 3 International Series	Hitech Racing	24	0	0	87	10th
2004	Formula 3 European Cup	Hitech Racing	1	0	0	N/A	7th
2004	Macau Grand Prix	Hitech Racing	1	1	0	N/A	11th
2004	Masters of Formula 3	Hitech Racing	1	0	0	N/A	16th
2004	Bahrain Superprix	Carlin Motorsport	1	0	0	N/A	6th
2005	British Formula 3 International Series	Hitech Racing	22	2	0	163	4th
2005	Masters of Formula 3	Hitech Racing	1	0	0	N/A	7th
2006	Japanese Formula 3 Championship	ThreeBond	18	0	1	124	7th
2006	Macau Grand Prix	Hitech Racing	1	1	0	N/A	13th
2007	British Formula 3 International Series	Hitech Racing	22	13	11	293	**1st**
2007	Macau Grand Prix	Hitech Racing	1	1	0	N/A	4th
2007	Masters of Formula 3	Hitech Racing	1	0	0	N/A	10th
2007	Japanese Formula 3 Championship	ThreeBond	8	0	0	31	10th
2008	GP2 Series	Fisichella Motor Sport International	12	0	0	0	28th
2008	Formula One	BMW Sauber	Test driver				
2009	Superleague Formula		Test driver				
2010	Austria Formula Renault Cup	Team Scuderia Nordica	1	1	1	20	15th
2011	FIA Formula 3 International Trophy	Double R Racing	5	0	0	0	NC
2011	Macau Grand Prix	Double R Racing	1	0	0	N/A	19th
2014	Blancpain Endurance Series - Pro-Am	GT Russian Team	1	0	0	0	0
2014	Blancpain GT Sprint Series	GT Russian Team	4	0	0	0	NC
2014	ADAC GT Masters	MRS GT-Racing	10	0	0	0	NC
2015	Blancpain Endurance Series - Pro-Am	GT Russian Team	5	0	0	47	5th
2015	Blancpain GT Sprint Series	GT Russian Team	11	0	0	8	21st
2015	24H Series - A6	GT Russian Team					
2015	Dubai 24 Hour	GT Russian Team	1	0	0	N/A	5th
2015	Super GT - GT300	Team Up Garage with Bandoh	2	0	0	0	NC
2017-18	Asian Le Mans Series - LMP2	Eurasia Motorsport	2	1	0	16	8th

=== Complete GP2 Series results ===
(key) (Races in bold indicate pole position) (Races in italics indicate fastest lap)

Year	Entrant	1	2	3	4	5	6	7	8	9	10	11	12	13	14	15	16	17	18	19	20	DC	Points
2008	Fisichella Motor Sport International	CAT; FEA	CAT; SPR	IST; FEA	IST; SPR	MON; FEA	MON; SPR	MAG; FEA; 17	MAG; SPR; 11	SIL; FEA; 20	SIL; SPR; 13	HOC; FEA; 14	HOC; SPR; 13	HUN; FEA; 18	HUN; SPR; Ret	VAL; FEA; DNS	VAL; SPR; Ret	SPA; FEA; 16	SPA; SPR; Ret	MNZ; FEA; Ret	MNZ; SPR; Ret	28th	0

Sporting positions
Preceded by Mike Conway	British Formula Three Champion; 2007	Succeeded by Jaime Alguersuari
