= 2009 Indy Lights =

2009 Indy Lights season
- Firestone Indy Lights

Season
- Races: 15
- Start date: April 4
- End date: October 9

Awards
- Drivers' champion: (United States) J. R. Hildebrand
- Teams' champion: (United States) Andretti Green-AFS Racing
- Rookie of the Year: (Colombia) Sebastián Saavedra

The 2009 Indy Racing League Firestone Indy Lights season began on April 4 in St. Petersburg, Florida, where it ran a doubleheader weekend in support to the season-opening IndyCar Series event, and concluded on October 9 at Homestead-Miami Speedway. The schedule consisted of 14 race weekends in support of the IndyCars, with 15 total races. Unlike in the 2008 season, the St. Petersburg weekend was the only doubleheader event held by the series. J. R. Hildebrand ended the season as champion for Andretti Green-AFS Racing, winning the championship by nearly 100 points ahead of Vision Racing's James Davison and his AGR-AFS Racing teammate Sebastián Saavedra.

== Drivers and teams ==
All drivers competed in Firestone-shod Dallaras.

Team	No	Drivers	Rounds
(United States) Team Moore Racing	2	(United States) Andrew Prendeville	All
(Canada) Brian Stewart Racing	3	(Russia) Sergey Mokshantsev	1–4, 6–9
(Canada) Brian Stewart Racing	33	(Chile) Pablo Donoso	1–4
(United States) Guthrie Meyer Racing	4	(United States) Sean Guthrie	1–4
(United States) Guthrie Meyer Racing	49	(Canada) Jesse Mason	1–5
(United States) Guthrie Meyer Racing	59	(United Kingdom) Alistair Jackson	1–4
(United States) RLR/Andersen Racing	5	(Brazil) Mario Romancini	All
(United States) RLR/Andersen Racing	6	(Chile) Pablo Donoso	11
(United States) RLR/Andersen Racing	6	(United Kingdom) Alistair Jackson	5, 8
(United States) RLR/Andersen Racing	9	(United Kingdom) Alistair Jackson	9–13
(United States) RLR/Andersen Racing	9	(United States) Jonathan Summerton	1–6
(United States) RLR/Andersen Racing	9	(Chile) Pablo Donoso	7–8
(United States) RLR/Andersen Racing	9	(United States) Sean Guthrie	15
(United States) Sam Schmidt Motorsports	7	(Canada) James Hinchcliffe	All
(United States) Sam Schmidt Motorsports	11	(New Zealand) Wade Cunningham	All
(United States) Sam Schmidt Motorsports	20	(Brazil) Ana Beatriz	1-5, 7–14
(United States) Sam Schmidt Motorsports	20	(United States) Logan Gomez	15
(United States) Sam Schmidt Motorsports	44	(Colombia) Gustavo Yacamán	1–13, 15
(United States) HVM Racing	8	(Mexico) Juan Pablo Garcia	13
(United States) Panther Racing	15	(United Kingdom) Martin Plowman	All
(United States) Panther Racing	16	(United Kingdom) Pippa Mann	All
(United States) Winners Circle Group	18	(Netherlands) Junior Strous	1–5
(United States) FIRST Motorsports (United States) Walker Racing	19	(United Kingdom) Stefan Wilson	1–3, 8–9, 12
(United States) Vision Racing	21	(Australia) James Davison	All
(United States) Alliance Motorsports	24	(United States) Logan Gomez	1–2
(United States) Alliance Motorsports	24	(United States) Mike Potekhen	5, 7–8, 11–15
(United States) Andretti Green-AFS Racing	26	(United States) J. R. Hildebrand	All
(United States) Andretti Green-AFS Racing	27	(Colombia) Sebastián Saavedra	All
(United States) Bryan Herta Autosport	28	(United States) Daniel Herrington	All
(United States) Bryan Herta Autosport	29	(Brazil) Felipe Guimarães	8, 12–13
(United States) Davey Hamilton Racing	32	(United States) Brandon Wagner	1–2, 5, 7, 11, 14–15
(United States) Team PBIR	35	(United States) Charlie Kimball	All
(United States) Team PBIR	37	(United Kingdom) Jay Howard	1–5
(United States) Team PBIR	37	(Chile) Pablo Donoso	6
(United States) Team PBIR	37	(France) Richard Philippe	8–14
(United States) Genoa Racing	36	(France) Richard Philippe	1–4
(United States) Genoa Racing	36	(Chile) Pablo Donoso	5
(United States) Genoa Racing	63	(United Kingdom) Duncan Tappy	1–2
(United States) Genoa Racing	63	(United States) Jonathan Bomarito	3
(United States) Genoa Racing	63	(United Kingdom) Dillon Battistini	4
(Brazil) ELFF Racing	55	(Brazil) Rodrigo Barbosa	All

== Schedule ==
The season consisted of fifteen races, which were held on a mix of ovals, temporary street circuits and road courses.

Round	Date	Race Name	Track	Location
1	April 4	(United States) St. Pete 100 Race 1	Streets of St. Petersburg	St. Petersburg
2	April 5	(United States) St. Pete 100 Race 2	Streets of St. Petersburg	St. Petersburg
3	April 19	(United States) Long Beach 100	Streets of Long Beach	Long Beach
4	April 26	(United States) Kansas Lottery 100	Kansas Speedway	Kansas City
5	May 22	(United States) Firestone Freedom 100	Indianapolis Motor Speedway	Speedway
6	May 31	(United States) Husar's House of Fine Diamonds 100	The Milwaukee Mile	West Allis
7	June 20	(United States) Miller Lite 100	Iowa Speedway	Newton
8	July 4	(United States) Corning 100	Watkins Glen International	Watkins Glen
9	July 11	(Canada) Toronto 100	Streets of Toronto	Toronto
10	July 25	(Canada) Grand Prix of Edmonton	Edmonton City Centre Airport	Edmonton
11	August 1	(United States) Kentucky 100	Kentucky Speedway	Sparta
12	August 9	(United States) Mid-Ohio 100	Mid-Ohio Sports Car Course	Lexington
13	August 23	(United States) Carneros 100	Infineon Raceway	Sonoma
14	August 29	(United States) Chicagoland 100	Chicagoland Speedway	Joliet
15	October 9	(United States) Homestead-Miami 100	Homestead-Miami Speedway	Homestead

Road Course or Street Circuit

== Race summaries ==
=== St. Pete 100 Race 1 ===
- Saturday April 4, 2009
- Streets of St. Petersburg, St. Petersburg, Florida
- Race weather: 79 °F (26 °C), partly cloudy
- Pole position winner: #26 J. R. Hildebrand 1:07.7704 sec, 95.617 mph (153.881 km/h)
- Race Summary: The league instituted new qualifying rules for the road courses in 2009. First, the cars were broken into two groups due to the increase in the size of the field, the fastest driver in either session would start from the pole and the other drivers in his session would line up in the odd-numbered positions for the race in order of speed while the drivers from the slower session would line up in the even-numbered positions. In addition, the league abandoned its practice of using partially inverted finishing order from race 1 of a doubleheader to determine the grid for race 2. Instead a separate qualifying session was held for the second race (which actually occurred before the first race had been held).

J. R. Hildebrand opened up a lead as big as 6 seconds during the first half of the race, with his pursuers being led by teammate Sebastián Saavedra and Junior Strous. On lap 18, a caution came out caused by Duncan Tappy spinning off-track and dragging debris onto the racing surface. On the restart, Hildebrand was unable to bring his car to full power due to an electrical issue and Strous was able to make the pass in turns 1 and 2 while making slight contact with Hildebrand's car. Jonathan Summerton was able to make his way past in a subsequent corner. However, Summerton was unable to challenge Strous for the victory, with Junior Strous capturing his first victory in his debut and the first major open wheel racing victory for team principal Paul Diatlovich (of PDM Racing).

Top Five Finishers
Fin. Pos	St. Pos	Car No.	Driver	Team	Laps	Time	Laps Led	Points
1	2	18	(Netherlands) Junior Strous	Winners Circle Group	40	50:06.5703	18	50
2	6	9	(United States) Jonathan Summerton	RLR-Andersen Racing	40	+0.7205	0	40
3	1	26	(United States) J. R. Hildebrand	AGR-AFS Racing	40	+2.1571	22	38
4	7	20	(Brazil) Ana Beatriz	Sam Schmidt Motorsports	40	+2.7368	0	32
5	8	37	(United Kingdom) Jay Howard	Team PBIR	40	+10.1525	0	30
Race average speed: 86.211 mph (138.743 km/h)
Lead changes: 1 between 2 drivers
Cautions: 2 for 6 laps

=== St. Pete 100 Race 2 ===
- Sunday April 5, 2009
- Streets of St. Petersburg, St. Petersburg, Florida
- Race weather: 82 °F (28 °C), mostly cloudy
- Pole position winner: #27 Sebastián Saavedra 1:07.2171 sec, 96.404 mph (155.147 km/h)
- Race Summary: J. R. Hildebrand led the field through lap 1 but it was ordered that he had jumped the start and was sent back to third position and his teammate polesitter Sebastián Saavedra assumed the lead. On lap 13 the most spectacular incident occurred when Ali Jackson and Pippa Mann tangled in turn 8 resulting in Jackson's car being wedged under Mann's and Mann's rear wheels sitting several feet in the air as she gunned the throttle attempting to get going. Both cars were ultimately able to continue but Mann soon suffered suspension failure and fell out of the race. On a lap 27 restart, J. R. Hildebrand who was running second suffered the same electrical issues he had the day before. He swung wide to let Junior Strous through on the inside into turn 1, but Ana Beatriz who was running behind Strous also dove for the open real estate and made contact with Hildebrand, taking both cars out. On the ensuing restart on lap 33, Strous was able to pass Hildebrand's teammate Saavedra going into turn 1 for the lead as Ali Jackson and teammate Jesse Mason crashed behind them bringing out another caution. Strous held off Saavedra on the restart on lap 37 and drove to his second victory of the weekend, becoming the third Indy Lights driver to sweep the St. Petersburg doubleheader weekend after Raphael Matos (2006) and Alex Lloyd (2007).

Top Five Finishers
Fin. Pos	St. Pos	Car No.	Driver	Team	Laps	Time	Laps Led	Points
1	2	18	(Netherlands) Junior Strous	Winners Circle Group	40	58:51.1100	8	50
2	1	27	(Colombia) Sebastián Saavedra	AGR-AFS Racing	40	+0.4428	32	43
3	7	7	(Canada) James Hinchcliffe	Sam Schmidt Motorsports	40	+1.8116	0	35
4	16	9	(United States) Jonathan Summerton	RLR-Andersen Racing	40	+2.5569	0	32
5	11	28	(United States) Daniel Herrington	Bryan Herta Autosport	40	+3.1994	0	30
Race average speed: 73.405 mph (118.134 km/h)
Lead changes: 1 between 2 drivers
Cautions: 6 for 18 laps

=== Long Beach 100 ===
- Sunday April 19, 2009
- Streets of Long Beach, Long Beach, California
- Race weather: 84 °F (29 °C), sunny
- Pole position winner: #26 J. R. Hildebrand 1:15.2695 sec, 94.126 mph (151.481 km/h)
- Race Summary:

Top Five Finishers
Fin. Pos	St. Pos	Car No.	Driver	Team	Laps	Time	Laps Led	Points
1	1	26	(United States) J. R. Hildebrand	AGR-AFS Racing	45	1:03:01.5734	45	53
2	4	36	(France) Richard Philippe	Genoa Racing	45	+1.8315	0	40
3	2	7	(Canada) James Hinchcliffe	Sam Schmidt Motorsports	45	+2.6707	0	35
4	5	9	(United States) Jonathan Summerton	RLR-Andersen Racing	45	+18.3432	0	32
5	7	20	(Brazil) Ana Beatriz	Sam Schmidt Motorsports	45	+24.4684	0	30
Race average speed: 84.308 mph (135.681 km/h)
Lead changes: None
Cautions: 2 for 6 laps

=== Kansas Lottery 100 ===
- Sunday April 26, 2009
- Kansas Speedway, Kansas City, Kansas
- Race weather: 72 °F (22 °C), Cloudy and Windy
- Pole position winner: #11 Wade Cunningham, 58.3812 sec, 187.458 mph (301.684 km/h) (2-lap)
- Race Summary: Due to the prospect of bad weather in the area, the race was moved up 2 hours to 10 AM local time. Heavy storms had moved through the area the previous night, leaving a "green" racetrack and gusty winds. The challenging conditions led to a number of major incidents in the race. The first occurred on lap 3 when Jesse Mason spun and was hit by Richard Philippe, both were uninjured. On the lap 9 restart Sebastián Saavedra was able to pass polesitter Wade Cunningham for the lead. The scariest incident of the day occurred on lap 15 when Ali Jackson hit the outside wall and Sergey Mokshantsev was unable to slow down due to a mechanical problem and ran into the back of Rodrigo Barbosa, flipping Mokshantsev's car upside down and into the wall. Despite the hard and unusual impact, Mokshantsev and the other two drivers were all uninjured. Saavedra was able to hold off the challenges of Cunningham until on lap 59 Dillon Battistini spun and collected Pippa Mann, who pierced Battistini's radiator, leaving a large amount of fluid on the track and resulting in the race ending under caution. Saavedra captured his first Indy Lights victory in his third start and his first on an oval.

Top Five Finishers
Fin. Pos	St. Pos	Car No.	Driver	Team	Laps	Time	Laps Led	Points
1	2	27	(Colombia) Sebastián Saavedra	AGR-AFS Racing	67	1:02:53.5296	58	52
2	1	11	(New Zealand) Wade Cunningham	Sam Schmidt Motorsports	67	+0.2557	9	41
3	6	5	(Brazil) Mario Romancini	RLR-Andersen Racing	67	+0.8524	0	35
4	3	20	(Brazil) Ana Beatriz	Sam Schmidt Motorsports	67	+1.1454	0	32
5	9	15	(United Kingdom) Martin Plowman	Panther Racing	67	+2.0955	0	30
Race average speed: 97.157 mph (156.359 km/h)
Lead changes: 1 between 2 drivers
Cautions: 5 for 33 laps

=== Firestone Freedom 100 ===
- Friday May 22, 2009
- Indianapolis Motor Speedway, Speedway, Indiana
- Race weather: 83 °F (28 °C), Sunny
- Pole position winner: #11 Wade Cunningham, 1:34.6485 sec, 190.177 mph (306.060 km/h) (2-lap)
- Race Summary:

Top Five Finishers
Fin. Pos	St. Pos	Car No.	Driver	Team	Laps	Time	Laps Led	Points
1	1	11	(New Zealand) Wade Cunningham	Sam Schmidt Motorsports	40	50:42.2548	14	51
2	3	26	(United States) J. R. Hildebrand	AGR-AFS Racing	40	+0.1046	23	42
3	18	5	(Brazil) Mario Romancini	RLR-Andersen Racing	40	+0.2821	0	35
4	6	37	(United Kingdom) Jay Howard	Team PBIR	40	+1.9084	0	32
5	2	27	(Colombia) Sebastián Saavedra	AGR-AFS Racing	40	+3.4193	3	30
Race average speed: 118.333 mph (190.439 km/h)
Lead changes: 9 between 3 drivers
Cautions: 4 for 17 laps

=== Husar's House of Fine Diamonds 100 ===
- Sunday May 31, 2009
- Milwaukee Mile, West Allis, Wisconsin
- Race weather: 57 °F (14 °C), Partially cloudy
- Pole position winner: #5 Mario Romancini, 49.4453 sec, 147.800 mph (237.861 km/h) (2-lap)
- Race Summary: Mario Romancini led from the pole and was closely pursued by the AGR-AFS Racing cars of J. R. Hildebrand and Sebastián Saavedra. However, Saavedra got caught up in an incident where Jonathan Summerton spun and dropped to the back. He elected to save his tires during what ultimately became a long green-flag run. In the last few laps Saavedra was able to use his better handling car to work through the field and back up to third place. However, he was unable to pass his teammate or Romancini and Romancini captured his first Indy Lights victory after leading every lap.

Top Five Finishers
Fin. Pos	St. Pos	Car No.	Driver	Team	Laps	Time	Laps Led	Points
1	1	5	(Brazil) Mario Romancini	RLR-Andersen Racing	100	53:26.8054	100	53
2	2	26	(United States) J. R. Hildebrand	AGR-AFS Racing	100	+1.0907	0	40
3	4	27	(Colombia) Sebastián Saavedra	AGR-AFS Racing	100	+4.0048	0	35
4	6	44	(Colombia) Gustavo Yacamán	Sam Schmidt Motorsports	100	+5.1809	0	32
5	7	21	(Australia) James Davison	Vision Racing	100	+6.4283	0	30
Race average speed: 113.945 mph (183.377 km/h)
Lead changes: None
Cautions: 4 for 17 laps

=== Miller Lite 100 ===
- Saturday June 20, 2009
- Iowa Speedway, Newton, Iowa
- Race weather:
- Pole position winner: #26 J. R. Hildebrand, 39.9348 sec, 161.183 mph (259.399 km/h) (2-lap)
- Race Summary: After dueling early with J. R. Hildebrand, Wade Cunningham took the lead on lap 4 and controlled the majority of the race. The car of Sergey Mokshantsev slowed on the track on lap 5, prompting a caution in order to tow it into the pits. Pippa Mann spun on lap 53, ending a long green flag run, which was soon followed by an incident between the cars of Andrew Prendeville and Brandon Wagner. Hildebrand, running second, was forced to serve a drive through penalty for blocking Daniel Herrington, which dropped him to ninth before recovering to finish sixth. No car was able to challenge Cunningham through much of the race, with the lead pack primarily running single-file. While running second Herrington spun but did not come into contact with the wall or another car, conceding second place to Ana Beatriz. Sebastián Saavedra, who had to pit at the start of the race due to a mechanical issue, ran with the lead pack despite being many laps down. His car got ahead of Cunningham's, but soon after began to impede Cunningham and caused him to lose much of his lead and Beatriz was able to overtake Cunningham. On the last lap of the race, a collision between James Davison and Pippa Mann sealed Beatriz's victory by bringing out the caution. Mann's car was overturned in the accident, but she was unhurt.

Top Five Finishers
Fin. Pos	St. Pos	Car No.	Driver	Team	Laps	Time	Laps Led	Points
1	6	20	(Brazil) Ana Beatriz	Sam Schmidt Motorsports	115	48:05.1062	9	50
2	2	11	(New Zealand) Wade Cunningham	Sam Schmidt Motorsports	115	+6.7954	103	42
3	5	7	(Canada) James Hinchcliffe	Sam Schmidt Motorsports	115	+6.8989	0	35
4	13	5	(Brazil) Mario Romancini	RLR-Andersen Racing	115	+8.6620	0	32
5	11	44	(Colombia) Gustavo Yacamán	Sam Schmidt Motorsports	115	+32.8424	0	30
Race average speed: 128.285 mph (206.455 km/h)
Lead changes: 2 between 3 drivers
Cautions: 4 for 24 laps

=== Corning 100 ===
- Saturday July 4, 2009
- Watkins Glen International, Watkins Glen, New York
- Race weather: 65 °F (18 °C), Partially cloudy
- Pole position winner: #21 James Davison, 1:37.1780 sec, 124.843 mph (200.915 km/h)
- Race Summary: James Davison was able to keep Sebastián Saavedra, who started alongside him, behind at the start. On lap 8, James Hinchcliffe who was running fourth spun in turn 6, causing light damage to the car. On the lap 10 restart J. R. Hildebrand was able to pass his teammate Saavedra for second and on lap 14 took the lead from Davison. On lap 27, Wade Cunningham nosed into the tires at turn 13, leaving a one-lap shootout for the checkered flag. On the final lap, Felipe Guimarães and Charlie Kimball were able to pass Saavedra for 3rd and 4th respectively with Kimball and Saavedra banging wheels on the entrance to the "Bus Stop" chicane. Saavedra was penalized 30 seconds for the contact, dropping him from 5th to 18th in the race results. Hildebrand became the second driver to win two races in the season (after Junior Strous) and extended his points lead to 58 points as virtually all of his closest pursuers had poor results.

Top Five Finishers
Fin. Pos	St. Pos	Car No.	Driver	Team	Laps	Time	Laps Led	Points
1	4	26	(United States) J. R. Hildebrand	AGR-AFS Racing	30	57:52.6759	17	52
2	1	21	(Australia) James Davison	Vision Racing	30	+0.5499	13	41
3	6	29	(Brazil) Felipe Guimarães	Bryan Herta Autosport	30	+1.2289	0	35
4	5	35	(United States) Charlie Kimball	Team PBIR	30	+2.8635	0	32
5	9	37	(France) Richard Philippe	Team PBIR	30	+3.4626	0	30
Race average speed: 104.807 mph (168.671 km/h)
Lead changes: 1 between 2 drivers
Cautions: 3 for 5 laps

=== Toronto 100 ===
- Saturday July 11, 2009
- Streets of Toronto, Toronto, Ontario
- Race weather: 70 °F (21 °C), damp, drying later
- Pole position winner: #27 Sebastián Saavedra, 1:04.6068 sec, 97.792 mph (157.381 km/h)
- Race Summary: Earlier in the day a heavy rainstorm passed through the area, drenching the track. However, by the start of the race the sun was coming out and the track began to dry. However, the league had declared the race a "wet race" and all cars were to start on rain tires. On the first lap, Mario Romancini ducked into the pits to switch to slick tires, a move that every car would eventually make, however most waited until laps 8 to 10 to make their stops. Indy Lights teams do not normally make pit stops and the cars had to be jacked up by a manually powered "quick jack" one half at a time. In addition each wheel nut is held in place by a retaining pin that must be removed and replaced when changing a wheel. This, along with the fact that many teams were not prepared to make pit stops meant that most stops were over 1 minute long. However, AGR-AFS Racing's two cars, J. R. Hildebrand and Sebastián Saavedra were able to pit much faster as, according to their team owner Gary Peterson, they do practice pit stops. Hildebrand left the pits with the lead however, Saavedra's car was much faster. Once a passing lane had dried enough to attempt a pass, Saavedra worked his way past on lap 18 and drove away for his second win of the season. The race had no caution flags or major incidents and only two cars retired from the race due to mechanical issues.

Top Five Finishers
Fin. Pos	St. Pos	Car No.	Driver	Team	Laps	Time	Laps Led	Points
1	1	27	(Colombia) Sebastián Saavedra	AGR-AFS Racing	50	58:06.7934	40	53
2	6	26	(United States) J. R. Hildebrand	AGR-AFS Racing	50	+5.8630	9	40
3	2	7	(Canada) James Hinchcliffe	Sam Schmidt Motorsports	50	+21.2968	0	35
4	5	19	(United Kingdom) Stefan Wilson	Walker Racing	50	+37.1928	0	32
5	3	21	(Australia) James Davison	Vision Racing	50	+42.8839	0	30
Race average speed: 90.599 mph (145.805 km/h)
Lead changes: 3 between 3 drivers
Cautions: None

=== Grand Prix of Edmonton ===
- Saturday July 25, 2009
- Rexall Speedway, Edmonton, Alberta
- Race weather:
- Pole position winner: #26 J. R. Hildebrand, 1:05.9065 sec, 107.771 mph (173.441 km/h)
- Race Summary:

Top Five Finishers
Fin. Pos	St. Pos	Car No.	Driver	Team	Laps	Time	Laps Led	Points
1	1	26	(United States) J. R. Hildebrand	AGR-AFS Racing	50	56:48.5498	50	53
2	2	37	(France) Richard Philippe	Team PBIR	50	+14.0154	0	40
3	5	27	(Colombia) Sebastián Saavedra	AGR-AFS Racing	50	+21.0644	0	35
4	4	7	(Canada) James Hinchcliffe	Sam Schmidt Motorsports	50	+22.8915	0	32
5	6	35	(United States) Charlie Kimball	Team PBIR	50	+44.1969	0	30
Race average speed: 104.191 mph (167.679 km/h)
Lead changes: None
Cautions: None

=== Kentucky 100 ===
- Saturday August 1, 2009
- Kentucky Speedway, Sparta, Kentucky
- Race weather: 79 °F (26 °C), partly cloudy
- Pole position winner: #26 J. R. Hildebrand (qualifying cancelled; field set by owner points)
- Race Summary:

Top Five Finishers
Fin. Pos	St. Pos	Car No.	Driver	Team	Laps	Time	Laps Led	Points
1	4	11	(New Zealand) Wade Cunningham	Sam Schmidt Motorsports	67	36:42.1492	22	50
2	2	27	(Colombia) Sebastián Saavedra	AGR-AFS Racing	67	+0.1227*	23	42
3	10	20	(Brazil) Ana Beatriz	Sam Schmidt Motorsports	67	+0.1838	2	35
4	6	21	(Australia) James Davison	Vision Racing	67	+0.5204	0	32
5	13	2	(United States) Andrew Prendeville	Team Moore Racing	67	+1.0364	0	30
Race average speed: 162.103 mph (260.879 km/h)
Lead changes: 6 between 4 drivers
Cautions: 2 for 9 laps

- * Race finished under caution.

=== Mid-Ohio 100 ===
- Sunday August 9, 2009
- Mid-Ohio Sports Car Course, Lexington, Ohio
- Race weather: 82 °F (28 °C), hazy
- Pole position winner: #21 James Davison, 1:14.8673 sec, 108.576 mph (174.736 km/h)
- Race Summary:

Top Five Finishers
Fin. Pos	St. Pos	Car No.	Driver	Team	Laps	Time	Laps Led	Points
1	1	21	(Australia) James Davison	Vision Racing	40	52:09.2142	40	53
2	2	7	(Canada) James Hinchcliffe	Sam Schmidt Motorsports	40	+4.0420	0	40
3	3	26	(United States) J. R. Hildebrand	AGR-AFS Racing	40	+5.7449	0	35
4	9	29	(Brazil) Felipe Guimarães	Bryan Herta Autosport	40	+16.9736	0	32
5	8	15	(United Kingdom) Martin Plowman	Panther Racing	40	+17.5878	0	30
Race average speed: 103.909 mph (167.225 km/h)
Lead changes: None
Cautions: 2 for 4 laps

=== Carneros 100 ===
- Sunday August 23, 2009
- Infineon Raceway, Sonoma, California
- Race weather: 62 °F (17 °C), overcast
- Pole position winner: #26 J. R. Hildebrand, 1:23.0361 sec, 99.846 mph (160.687 km/h)
- Race Summary:

Top Five Finishers
Fin. Pos	St. Pos	Car No.	Driver	Team	Laps	Time	Laps Led	Points
1	1	26	(United States) J. R. Hildebrand	AGR-AFS Racing	40	1:01:44.4612	40	53
2	3	29	(Brazil) Felipe Guimarães	Bryan Herta Autosport	40	+15.8918	0	40
3	5	21	(Australia) James Davison	Vision Racing	40	+23.5403	0	35
4	6	37	(France) Richard Philippe	Team PBIR	40	+37.1880	0	32
5	2	20	(Brazil) Ana Beatriz	Sam Schmidt Motorsports	40	+40.1798	0	30
Race average speed: 89.522 mph (144.072 km/h)
Lead changes: None
Cautions: 1 for 6 laps

=== Chicagoland 100 ===
- Saturday August 29, 2009
- Chicagoland Speedway, Joliet, Illinois
- Race weather: 69 °F (21 °C), mostly cloudy
- Pole position winner: #32 Brandon Wagner, 57.6140 sec, 189.954 mph (305.701 km/h) (2-lap)
- Race Summary: With his fifth-place finish, J. R. Hildebrand became the first American champion since 2002, when A. J. Foyt IV took the honours in the inaugural Infiniti Pro Series.

Top Five Finishers
Fin. Pos	St. Pos	Car No.	Driver	Team	Laps	Time	Laps Led	Points
1	9	28	(United States) Daniel Herrington	Bryan Herta Autosport	67	44:07.3016	26	50
2	6	21	(Australia) James Davison	Vision Racing	67	+0.0613	1	40
3	14	2	(United States) Andrew Prendeville	Team Moore Racing	67	+0.2322	0	35
4	3	11	(New Zealand) Wade Cunningham	Sam Schmidt Motorsports	67	+0.2976	39	34
5	13	26	(United States) J. R. Hildebrand	AGR-AFS Racing	67	+0.4186	0	30
Race average speed: 138.490 mph (222.878 km/h)
Lead changes: 5 between 4 drivers
Cautions: 2 for 14 laps

=== Homestead-Miami 100 ===
- Friday October 9, 2009
- Homestead-Miami Speedway, Homestead, Florida
- Race weather: 87 °F (31 °C), partially cloudy
- Pole position winner: #21 James Davison, 57.6245 sec, 185.546 mph (298.607 km/h) (2-lap)
- Race Summary:

Top Five Finishers
Fin. Pos	St. Pos	Car No.	Driver	Team	Laps	Time	Laps Led	Points
1	10	5	(Brazil) Mario Romancini	RLR-Andersen Racing	67	43:26.4173	1	50
2	7	26	(United States) J. R. Hildebrand	AGR-AFS Racing	67	+0.0057	32	42
3	16	27	(Colombia) Sebastián Saavedra	AGR-AFS Racing	67	+0.4034	0	35
4	6	24	(United States) Mike Potekhen	Alliance Motorsports	67	+0.4906	0	32
5	1	21	(Australia) James Davison	Vision Racing	67	+1.6866	30	31
Race average speed: 137.423 mph (221.161 km/h)
Lead changes: 11 between 4 drivers
Cautions: 3 for 16 laps

== Championship standings ==
=== Drivers' Championship ===
Scoring system

Position	**1st**	**2nd**	**3rd**	**4th**	**5th**	**6th**	**7th**	**8th**	**9th**	**10th**	**11th**	**12th**	**13th**	**14th**	**15th**	**16th**	**17th**	**18th**	**19th**	**20th**	**21st**	**22nd**	**23rd**	**24th**	**25th**	**26th**	**+27th**
Points	50	40	35	32	30	28	26	24	22	20	19	18	17	16	15	14	13	12	11	10	9	8	7	6	5	4	3

- The driver who starts on pole is awarded one point (except for Race 2 of doubleheader weekends)
- The driver who leads the most laps in a race is awarded two additional points.

Pos	Driver	STP (United States)		LBH (United States)	KAN (United States)	INDY (United States)	MIL (United States)	IOW (United States)	WGL (United States)	TOR (Canada)	EDM (Canada)	KTY (United States)	MOH (United States)	SNM (United States)	CHI (United States)	HMS (United States)	Points
1	(United States) J. R. Hildebrand	**3***	21	**1***	14	2*	2	**6**	1*	2	**1***	**17**^{1}	3	**1***	5	2*	545
2	(Australia) James Davison	8	17	7	8	6	5	10	**2**	5	10	4	**1***	3	2	**5**	447
3	(Colombia) Sebastián Saavedra RY	26	**2***	8	1*	5	3	15	18	**1***	3	2*	18	7	6	3	446
4	(New Zealand) Wade Cunningham	16	11	20	**2**	**1**	6	2*	19	7	6	1	14	12	4*	6	416
5	(Canada) James Hinchcliffe R	6	3	3	12	16	7	3	21	3	4	7	2	6	12	14	395
6	(Brazil) Mario Romancini R	9	6	24	3	3	**1***	4	20	6	8	10	17	9	16	1	392
7	(United States) Daniel Herrington R	7	5	10	6	7	14	9	6	9	9	6	6	11	1	12	383
8	(Brazil) Ana Beatriz	4	23	5	4	17		1	9	13	12	3	12	5	14		320
9	(United States) Andrew Prendeville	17	15	16	9	15	8	11	13	10	7	5	7	13	3	10	313
10	(United States) Charlie Kimball R	10	7	19	13	13	10	7	4	15	5	18	13	8	7	13	310
11	(United Kingdom) Martin Plowman R	15	16	15	5	22	15	8	10	12	13	9	5	10	8	7	298
12	(Colombia) Gustavo Yacamán R	12	9	9	17	18	4	5	7	8	16	19	10	19		16	269
13	(France) Richard Philippe R	19	10	2	24				5	14	2	12	9	4	11		254
14	(United Kingdom) Pippa Mann R	18	24	14	16	21	9	13	14	16	11	15	15	14	9	8	237
15	(Brazil) Rodrigo Barbosa R	23	13	25	21	20	12	DNS	17	17	14	13	19	17	10	15	190
16	(United Kingdom) Alistair Jackson R	11	20	6	20	19			15	11	15	14	16	15			172
17	(United States) Jonathan Summerton R	2	4	4	7	12	16										162
18	(United States) Mike Potekhen					14		14	11			8	11	16	13	4	157
19	(Chile) Pablo Donoso	14	26	11	19	9	11	12	8			16					147
20	(Netherlands) Junior Strous R	1	1	23	11	10											146
21	(United Kingdom) Jay Howard	5	8	13	10	4											123
22	(United Kingdom) Stefan Wilson R	13	22	17					12	4			8				112
23	(Brazil) Felipe Guimarães R								3				4	2			107
24	(United States) Brandon Wagner R	20	18			11		16				11			**15**	17	103
25	(Russia) Sergey Mokshantsev R	27	14	21	22		13	17	16	18							92
26	(Canada) Jesse Mason	21	19	12	23	8											69
27	(United States) Sean Guthrie	22	12	22	18											11	65
28	(United States) Logan Gomez	24	25													9	33
29	(United Kingdom) Dillon Battistini				15												15
30	(United States) Jonathan Bomarito R			18													12
31	(Mexico) Juan Pablo Garcia R													18			12
32	(United Kingdom) Duncan Tappy R	25	27														8
Pos	Driver	STP (United States)		LBH (United States)	KAN (United States)	IND (United States)	MIL (United States)	IOW (United States)	WAT (United States)	TOR (Canada)	EDM (Canada)	KEN (United States)	MID (United States)	SON (United States)	CHI (United States)	HOM (United States)	Points

Color	Result
Gold	Winner
Silver	2nd place
Bronze	3rd place
Green	4th & 5th place
Light Blue	6th–10th place
Dark Blue	Finished (Outside Top 10)
Purple	Did not finish
Red	Did not qualify (DNQ)
Brown	Withdrawn (Wth)
Black	Disqualified (DSQ)
White	Did not start (DNS)
Blank	Did not participate (DNP)
Blank	Not competing

**In-line notation**
**Bold**	Pole position (1 point)
Italics	Ran fastest race lap
*	Led most race laps (2 points)
^{1}	Qualifying cancelled no bonus point awarded
Rookie of the Year
Rookie

== See also ==
- 2009 IndyCar Series season
- 2009 Atlantic Championship season
