= Jaques Lazier =

American racing driver

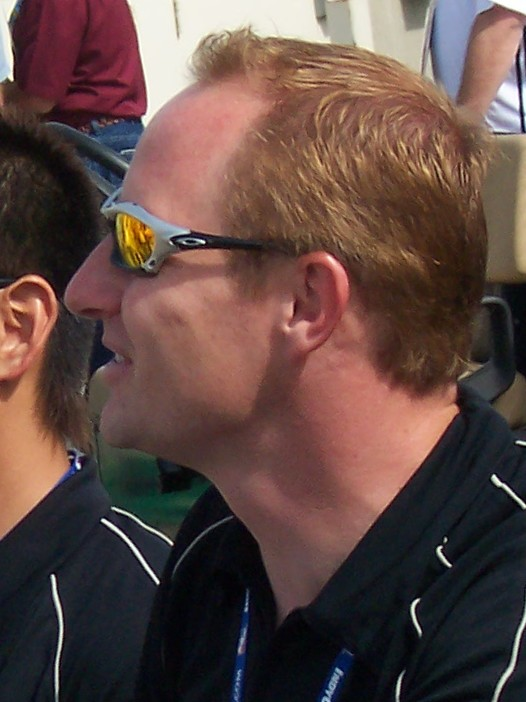
- Lazier in 2006
- Born: January 25, 1971 (age 55) Denver, Colorado, U.S.
- Relatives: Bob Lazier (father); Buddy Lazier (brother)

IRL IndyCar Series career
- Debut season: 1999
- Current team: Team 3G
- Car number: 98
- Former teams: Truscelli Team Racing; Mid-America Motorsports; Team XTreme; Team Menard; Sam Schmidt Motorsports; Patrick Racing; Chip Ganassi Racing; Playa Del Racing
- Starts: 56
- Wins: 1
- Poles: 2
- Best finish: 17th in 2001

Previous series
- 1989-1997 1997: U.S. Formula Ford; Indy Lights

Jaques Lazier (born January 25, 1971) is an American former professional racing driver. He is the younger brother of 1996 Indianapolis 500 champion Buddy Lazier and son of former Indy racer Bob Lazier.

== Racing career ==
The younger Lazier ran in U.S. Formula Ford competition from 1989 to 1997 and also drove part-time in Indy Lights in 1997. In 1998, he was entered for the Indianapolis 500 in a car owned by Price Cobb, but neither Lazier nor the car took part in any session. He planned to join the IRL IndyCar Series full-time in 1999 for his own team but he couldn't take the start at Phoenix International Raceway and failed to qualify for the Indy 500. He moved to the new Truscelli Team Racing the week after the Indy 500 and made his first start at Texas Motor Speedway. He finished seventh three times late in the season. He made his first Indy 500 start in 2000, although Truscelli shut down later that season, again leaving Lazier without a ride.

In 2001, Lazier drove for four different teams including TeamXtreme and Sam Schmidt Motorsports, he got his best chance with Team Menard, replacing Greg Ray. He won his second start for the team at Chicagoland Speedway. He drove for Menard for the first four races of the 2002 season until he was injured in a crash at Nazareth Speedway, just before the Indy 500, missing the rest of the season. In 2003, he returned to his seat but was let go by Team Menard, this time after the Indy 500. He signed on with A. J. Foyt Enterprises for the next four races, but funds failed to materialize for the remainder of the season and he was left on the sidelines.

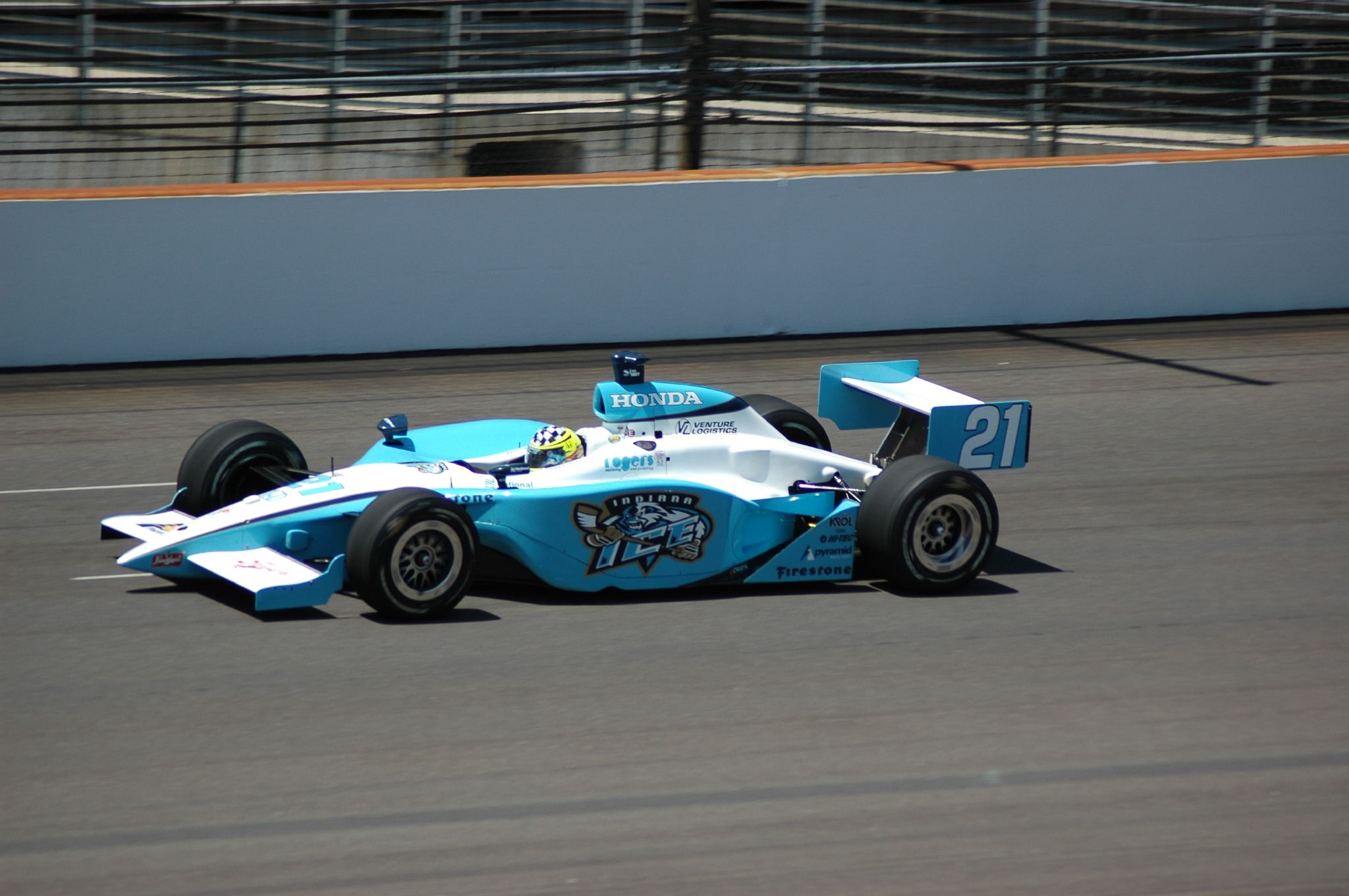
Lazier practicing for the 2007 Indianapolis 500

Lazier entered the 2004 season without a ride, but was the relief driver for Robby Gordon in the Indy 500 as he had to leave for Charlotte to drive in the Coca-Cola 600. Later that season he made eight starts for Patrick Racing after Al Unser Jr. retired and posted several good results, but again was ride-less entering 2005. He struck a deal with the new Playa del Racing team to contest the Indy 500 but their funds were good only for that race.

When veteran owner Chip Ganassi fired British driver Darren Manning, he called on Lazier to replace him for the remaining oval races of the season. While with the team he was involved in an incident with rookie fan favorite Danica Patrick at the final race at California Speedway. The two touched and set off an accident, whereupon some reports claimed Patrick "gave Lazier a love tap". Rahal Letterman Racing, Patrick's team, put out a press release saying Patrick had only told Lazier to mind his business in the future.

Without a full-time ride in 2006, Lazier returned to the 2007 Indy 500 with Playa Del Racing. He led for the first time at Indy for two laps when he stayed out on the track when the leaders pitted. However, he crashed late in the race and finished 27th. Lazier, while actively seeking a ride in the series, was unable to find one until he stepped in for the struggling Stanton Barrett at Team 3G at Texas Motor Speedway in 2009. He drove in the next race as well and made four more oval starts for the team later in the year. His thirteenth place at Iowa Speedway was his best IndyCar finish since 2004. His last IndyCar appearance was in 2010, when he replaced A. J. Foyt IV at the Indy 500 during Bump Day. With very few laps in the car, Lazier fell short of the required speed and failed to qualify.

== Motorsports career results ==
=== SCCA National Championship Runoffs ===
Year	Track	Car	Engine	Class	Finish	Start	Status
1994	Mid-Ohio	Mysterian M2	Volkswagen	Formula Vee	11	24	Running
1995	Mid-Ohio	Mysterian M2	Volkswagen	Formula Vee	3	1	Running
1996	Mid-Ohio	Mysterian M2	Volkswagen	Formula Vee	1	27	Running
1997	Mid-Ohio	Mysterian M2	Volkswagen	Formula Vee	19	2	Running

=== American open–wheel racing results ===
(key) (Races in bold indicate pole position)

==== Indy Lights ====
Year	Team	1	2	3	4	5	6	7	8	9	10	11	12	13	Rank	Points
1997	Brian Stewart Racing	MIA	LBH; 11	NAZ; 12	SAV; 24	STL; 9	MIL; 8	DET; 23	POR	TOR	TRO	VAN	LAG	FON	**22nd**	**12**

==== IndyCar Series ====
Year	Team	No.	Chassis	Engine	1	2	3	4	5	6	7	8	9	10	11	12	13	14	15	16	17	Rank	Points	Ref
1999	DR Motorsports	33	G-Force GF01C	Infiniti VRH35ADE V8	WDW	PHX; DNS	CLT															18th	144	
1999	DR Motorsports	33	G-Force GF01C	Oldsmobile Aurora V8				INDY; DNQ														18th	144	
1999	Truscelli Team Racing	33	G-Force GF01C	Oldsmobile Aurora V8					TXS; 22	PPI; 10	ATL; 12	DOV; 7	PP2; 12	LVS; 7	TX2; 7							18th	144	
2000	Truscelli Team Racing	33	G-Force GF05	Oldsmobile Aurora V8	WDW; 23	PHX	LVS; 10	INDY; 13	TXS; 14	PPI; 9	ATL											20th	112	
2000	Mid-America Motorsports	43	Dallara IR-00	Oldsmobile Aurora V8								KTY; 20										20th	112	
2000	Team Xtreme	16	G-Force GF05	Oldsmobile Aurora V8									TX2; 10									20th	112	
2001	Team Xtreme	77	G-Force GF05B	Oldsmobile Aurora V8	PHX	HMS	ATL	INDY; 22	TXS; 9	PPI; 17												17th	195	
2001	Sam Schmidt Motorsports	99	Dallara IR-01	Oldsmobile Aurora V8							**RIR**; 19	KAN; 18	NSH; 3	KTY; 12								17th	195	
2001	Team Menard	2	Dallara IR-01	Oldsmobile Aurora V8											STL; 16	**CHI**; 1	TX2; 20					17th	195	
2002	Team Menard	2	Dallara IR-02	Chevrolet Indy V8	HMS; 18	PHX; 6	FON; 2	NZR; 20	INDY	TXS	PPI	RIR	KAN	NSH	MIS	KTY	STL	CHI	TX2			26th	90	
2003	Team Menard	2	Dallara IR-03	Chevrolet Indy V8	HMS; 20	PHX; 6	MOT; 12	INDY; 29									NZR; DNS	CHI	FON	TX2		23rd	120	
2003	A. J. Foyt Enterprises	5	Dallara IR-03	Toyota Indy V8					TXS; 19	PPI; 21	RIR; 16	KAN; 10	NSH	MIS	STL	KTY						23rd	120	
2004	Robby Gordon Motorsports	70	Dallara IR-04	Chevrolet Indy V8	HMS	PHX	MOT	INDY^{1} RL	TXS	RIR	KAN											22nd	104	
2004	Patrick Racing	20	Dallara IR-04	Chevrolet Indy V8								NSH; 21	MIL; 17	MIS; 18	KTY; 15	PPI; 8	NZR; 14	CHI; 18	FON	TX2		22nd	104	
2005	Playa Del Racing	21	Panoz GF09C	Toyota Indy V8	HMS	PHX	STP	MOT	INDY; 16	TXS	RIR	KAN	NSH	MIL								24th	81	
2005	Chip Ganassi Racing	10	Panoz GF09C	Toyota Indy V8											MIS; 17	KTY; 15	PPI; DNS	SNM	CHI; 16	WGL	FON; 17	24th	81	
2006	Playa Del Racing	21	Panoz GF09C	Honda HI6R V8	HMS	STP	MOT	INDY; 17	WGL	TXS	RIR	KAN	NSH	MIL	MIS	KTY	SNM	CHI				**29th**	**13**	
2007	Playa Del Racing	21	Panoz GF09C	Honda HI7R V8	HMS	STP	MOT	KAN	INDY; 27	MIL	TXS	IOW	RIR	WGL	NSH	MOH	MIS	KTY	SNM	DET	CHI	**33rd**	**10**	
2009	Team 3G	98	Dallara IR-05	Honda HI9R V8	STP	LBH	KAN	INDY	MIL	TXS; 18	IOW; 13	RIR; 20	WGL	TOR	EDM	KTY; 23	MOH	SNM	CHI; 19	MOT	HMS; 23	26th	77	
2010	A. J. Foyt Enterprises	41	Dallara IR-05	Honda HI10R V8	SAO	STP	ALA	LBH	KAN	INDY; DNQ	TXS	IOW	WGL	TOR	EDM	MOH	SNM	CHI	KTY	MOT	HMS	NC	–	

^{1} Relieved Robby Gordon.

Years	Teams	Races	Poles	Wins	Podiums (Non-win)	Top 10s (Non-podium)	Indianapolis 500 Wins	Championships
11	9	56	2	1	2	12	0	0

==== Indianapolis 500 ====
Year	Chassis	Engine	Start	Finish	Team	Note
1999	G-Force GF01C	Oldsmobile Aurora V8	DNQ		DR Motorsports	
2000	G-Force GF05	Oldsmobile Aurora V8	26	13	Truscelli Racing Team	
2001	G-Force GF05B	Oldsmobile Aurora V8	17	22	Team Xtreme	
2003	Dallara IR-03	Chevrolet Indy V8	20	29	Team Menard	
2004	Dallara IR-04	Chevrolet Indy V8	18	29	Robby Gordon Motorsports	Relieved Robby Gordon
2005	Panoz GF09C	Toyota Indy V8	27	16	Playa Del Racing	
2006	Panoz GF09C	Honda HI6R V8	24	17	Playa Del Racing	
2007	Panoz GF09C	Honda HI7R V8	28	27	Playa Del Racing	
2010	Dallara IR-05	Honda HI10R V8	DNQ		A. J. Foyt Enterprises	
