= Richard Philippe =

French racing driver (1990–2018)

- Nationality: (France) French
- Born: January 10, 1990 Valence, Drôme, France
- Died: November 22, 2018 (aged 28) Dominican Republic
- Relatives: Nelson Philippe (brother)

Firestone Indy Lights Series career
- Debut season: 2009
- Current team: Team PBIR
- Car number: 37
- Former teams: Genoa Racing
- Starts: 11
- Wins: 0
- Poles: 0
- Fastest laps: 0
- Best finish: 13th in 2009

Previous series
- 2008 2007 2006 2005: Formula Three Euroseries; World Series by Renault; Champ Car Atlantic; Formula BMW USA

Championship titles
- 2005: Formula BMW USA

Richard Philippe (January 10, 1990 in Valence, Drôme – 22 November 2018) was a French racecar driver who resided in Miami, Florida. He was the younger brother of Nelson Philippe.

After moving up from the go-kart ranks in 2005, at fifteen years old Philippe won the Formula BMW USA championship in his rookie season, and on June 19, 2005 he became the youngest driver ever to win a race at the Indianapolis Motor Speedway. In 2006, he competed in the Champ Car Atlantic series with Forsythe Championship Racing. In 2007, he competed in the World Series by Renault. In 2009, Philippe ran for Genoa Racing in the Firestone Indy Lights Series until a crash on the high speed Kansas Speedway oval sidelined him for three races. He returned to the series with Team PBIR and competed in seven more races. He finished second twice, at Long Beach with Genoa and at Edmonton with PBIR, and finished 13th in points despite missing four races (he withdrew from the final race due to an ill-handling car in practice).

Phillippe died in a helicopter crash in the Dominican Republic on 22 November 2018.

== Racing record ==
=== Career summary ===
Season	Series	Team	Car No.	Races	Wins	Poles	F/Laps	Podiums	Points	Position
2005	Formula BMW USA	Team Autotecnica		14	3	6	5	7	151	1st
2006	Champ Car Atlantic	Forsythe Racing	33	12	0	0	0	1	86	15th
2007	Formula Renault 3.5 Series	Fortec Motorsport	30	10	0	0	0	0	0	33rd
2008	Formula 3 Euro Series	Carlin Motorsport	21	14	0	0	0	0	0	28th
2008	Formula 3 Euro Series	SG Formula	21	6	0	0	0	0	0	28th
2008	Masters of Formula 3	Carlin Motorsport	39	1	0	0	0	0	N/A	NC
2009	Indy Lights	Genoa Racing	36	4	0	0	0	1	254	13th
2009	Indy Lights	Team PBIR	37	7	0	0	0	1	254	13th

=== American open–wheel racing results ===
(key)

==== Atlantic Championship ====
Year	Team	1	2	3	4	5	6	7	8	9	10	11	12	Rank	Points
2006	Forsythe Racing	LBH; Ret	HOU; Ret	MTY; 17	POR; Ret	CLE1; 11	CLE2; 2	TOR; Ret	EDM; 4	SJO; 17	DEN; Ret	MTL; 9	ROA; Ret	15th	86

==== Indy Lights ====
Year	Team	1	2	3	4	5	6	7	8	9	10	11	12	13	14	15	Rank	Points	Ref
2009	Genoa Racing	STP1; 19	STP2; 10	LBH; 2	KAN; 24	INDY	MIL	IOW									13th	254	
2009	Team PBIR								WGL; 5	TOR; 14	EDM; 2	KTY; 12	MOH; 9	SNM; 4	CHI; 11	HMS; Wth	13th	254	

=== Complete Formula Renault 3.5 Series results ===
(key)

Year	Entrant	1	2	3	4	5	6	7	8	9	10	11	12	13	14	15	16	17	DC	Points
2007	Fortec Motorsport	MNZ; 1; 17	MNZ; 2 Ret	NÜR; 1	NÜR; 2	MON; 1 DNQ	HUN; 1; 18	HUN; 2; 14	SPA; 1 Ret	SPA; 2 Ret	DON; 1	DON; 2	MAG; 1	MAG; 2	EST; 1; 18	EST; 2; 13	CAT; 1 Ret	CAT; 2; 20	33rd	0

=== Complete Formula 3 Euro Series results ===
(key)

Year	Entrant	Chassis	Engine	1	2	3	4	5	6	7	8	9	10	11	12	13	14	15	16	17	18	19	20	DC	Points
2008	Carlin Motorsport	Dallara F308/055	Mercedes	HOC1; 1; 16	HOC1; 2; 17	MUG; 1; 15	MUG; 2; 17	PAU; 1 Ret	PAU; 2 Ret	NOR; 1; 22	NOR; 2; 16	ZAN; 1; 16	ZAN; 2; 12	NÜR; 1; 10	NÜR; 2; 18	BRH; 1; 14	BRH; 2; 24							28th	0
2008	SG Formula	Dallara F308/014	Mercedes															CAT; 1; 19	CAT; 2; 9	LMS; 1; 11	LMS; 2 Ret	HOC2; 1; 18	HOC2; 2; 18	28th	0

Sporting positions
Preceded by Andreas Wirth	Formula BMW USA; Champion; 2005	Succeeded by Robert Wickens
