= Jesse Mason =

Canadian racing driver (born 1984)

- Born: April 25, 1984 (age 42) Niagara Falls, Ontario, Canada
- Relatives: Nelson Mason (brother)

Firestone Indy Lights Series
- Years active: 2004, 2009
- Teams: Brian Stewart Racing; Guthrie Meyer Racing
- Starts: 15
- Wins: 0
- Poles: 0
- Best finish: 6th in 2004

Previous series
- 2003 2003: British Formula Three Championship; German Formula Three Championship

Jesse Mason (born April 25, 1984) is a Canadian former racecar driver from Niagara Falls, Ontario.

After karting and some amateur classes in Canada, Mason competed in the British Formula Three Championship National Class for Performance Racing in 2003 and finished sixth in class points. He also made two starts in the German Formula Three Championship for the same team that year. Mason returned to North America and shifted to the Indy Pro Series in 2004 competing in the first ten races of the season for Brian Stewart Racing, falling from third to sixth in points by missing the final two races. He posted best finishes of third at Homestead and Nashville. Mason then put his driving career on hiatus to study Motorsports Engineering and Design at the Swansea Institute in Wales. After graduation, he commenced active involvement with the Canadian Motor Speedway development in Canada, which he remains an active member of the development team. He returned to the Firestone Indy Lights Series, formerly the Indy Pro Series, in 2009 competing for Guthrie Meyer Racing. However, Guthrie Meyer Racing shut down after the Freedom 100, leaving Mason without a ride.

== American open–wheel racing results ==
(key)

=== Indy Lights / Indy Pro Series ===
Year	Team	1	2	3	4	5	6	7	8	9	10	11	12	13	14	15	Rank	Points	Ref
2004	Brian Stewart Racing	HMS; 3	PHX; 4	INDY; 15	KAN; 6	NSH; 3	MIL; 4	MIS; 6	KTY; 8	PPIR; 4	CHI; 9	FON	TXS				6th	283	
2009	Guthrie Meyer Racing	STP; 21	STP; 19	LBH; 12	KAN; 23	INDY; 8	MIL	IOW	WGL	TOR	EDM	KTY	MOH	SNM	CHI	HMS	26th	69	
