= 2007 British Formula 3 International Series =

Seasons
- ← 2006 2008 →

The 2007 British Formula 3 International Series was the 57th British Formula 3 International Series season. It commenced on 9 April 2007 and ended on 30 September after twenty two races, with Estonian driver Marko Asmer crowned champion. Future Formula One driver Sergio Pérez won the National Championship.

The scoring system was 20-15-12-10-8-6-4-3-2-1 points awarded to the first ten finishers, with one extra point added to the driver who set the fastest lap of the race. If a Class B driver or a guest driver finished among the top finishers, he would not score points for the main championship, and the points would be awarded to the next driver in the standings.

Three events (six rounds) were held outside the United Kingdom: Monza, Spa-Francorchamps and Bucharest.

== Teams and drivers ==
Team	Chassis	Engine	No	Driver	Rounds
Championship Class
(United Kingdom) Räikkönen Robertson Racing	Dallara F307	Mercedes	1	(United Kingdom) Stephen Jelley	All
(United Kingdom) Räikkönen Robertson Racing	Dallara F307	Mercedes	2	(United Kingdom) Jonathan Kennard	All
(United Kingdom) Räikkönen Robertson Racing	Dallara F307	Mercedes	26	(Finland) Atte Mustonen	All
(United Kingdom) Carlin Motorsport	Dallara F307	Mercedes	3	(United Kingdom) Sam Bird	All
(United Kingdom) Carlin Motorsport	Dallara F307	Mercedes	4	(Brazil) Mario Moraes	All
(United Kingdom) Carlin Motorsport	Dallara F307	Mercedes	21	(Republic of Ireland) Niall Breen	All
(United Kingdom) Carlin Motorsport	Dallara F307	Mercedes	22	(Brazil) Alberto Valerio	All
(United Kingdom) Carlin Motorsport	Dallara F307	Mercedes	23	(Germany) Maro Engel	All
(United Kingdom) Fortec Motorsport	Dallara F307	Mercedes	5	(Sweden) Sebastian Hohenthal	All
(United Kingdom) Fortec Motorsport	Dallara F307	Mercedes	44	(United Kingdom) Leo Mansell	All
(United Kingdom) Fortec Motorsport	Dallara F307	Mercedes	50	(United Kingdom) Greg Mansell	All
(United Kingdom) Hitech Racing	Dallara F307	Mercedes	6	(Austria) Walter Grubmüller	All
(United Kingdom) Hitech Racing	Dallara F307	Mercedes	7	(Estonia) Marko Asmer	All
(United Kingdom) Alan Docking Racing	Dallara F307	Mugen-Honda	8	(Italy) Francesco Castellacci	All
(United Kingdom) Alan Docking Racing	Dallara F307	Mugen-Honda	24	(Australia) John Martin	All
(United Kingdom) T-Sport	Dallara F307	Mugen-Honda	9	(Venezuela) Rodolfo González	All
(Sweden) Performance Racing Europe AB	Dallara F307	Mugen-Honda	10	(Angola) Ricardo Teixeira	All
(Sweden) Performance Racing Europe AB	Dallara F307	Mugen-Honda	11	(Macau) Rodolfo Ávila	1
(United Kingdom) Fluid Motorsport	Lola B06/30	Mugen-Honda	12	(South Africa) Cristiano Morgado	2
(United Kingdom) Fluid Motorsport	Lola B06/30	Mugen-Honda	12	(South Africa) Sean Petterson	3–7
(United Kingdom) Ultimate Motorsport	Mygale M07-F3	Mercedes	14	(Argentina) Esteban Guerrieri	All
(United Kingdom) Ultimate Motorsport	Mygale M07-F3	Mercedes	15	(Republic of Ireland) Michael Devaney	All
(United Kingdom) Arena International Motorsport	Dallara F307	Mercedes	16	(United Kingdom) Max Chilton	2–11
National Class
(United Kingdom) T-Sport	Dallara F304	Mugen-Honda	31	(Mexico) Sergio Pérez	All
(United Kingdom) T-Sport	Dallara F304	Mugen-Honda	77	(Bahrain) Salman Al Khalifa	6–11
(United Kingdom) Fluid Motorsport	Lola-Dome F106-04	Mugen-Honda	32	(South Africa) Sean Petterson	1–2
(United Kingdom) Fluid Motorsport	Lola-Dome F106-04	Mugen-Honda	33	(Mexico) Juan Pablo Garcia	1–10
(United Kingdom) Promatecme	Dallara F304	Mugen-Honda	34	(United Kingdom) Alex Waters	1–7
(United Kingdom) Promatecme	Dallara F304	Mugen-Honda	60	(United Kingdom) Richard Singleton	11
(United Kingdom) Promatecme	Dallara F304	Mugen-Honda	77	(Bahrain) Salman Al Khalifa	1–4
(United Kingdom) Räikkönen Robertson Racing	Dallara F304	Mugen-Honda	35	(United Kingdom) Alistair Jackson	1–6
(United Kingdom) Räikkönen Robertson Racing	Dallara F304	Mugen-Honda	36	(Spain) Albert Costa	1–5
(United Kingdom) Räikkönen Robertson Racing	Dallara F304	Mugen-Honda	40	(Romania) Mihai Marinescu	11
(United Kingdom) Räikkönen Robertson Racing	Dallara F304	Mugen-Honda	59	(Brazil) Ernesto Otero	8, 10
(United Kingdom) Alan Docking Racing	Dallara F304	Mugen-Honda	37	(Iceland) Viktor Jensen	1–10
(Sweden) Performance Racing Europe AB	Dallara F304	Mugen-Honda	38	(Bahrain) Hamed Al Fardan	All
(Sweden) Performance Racing Europe AB	Dallara F304	Mugen-Honda	39	(China) Congfu Cheng	1–10
(United Kingdom) Master Motorsport	Dallara F304	Mugen-Honda	55	(United Kingdom) Michael Meadows	1–10
Invitation Entries
(Italy) Ombra Racing	Dallara F305	Mugen-Honda	62	(Italy) Matteo Chinosi	5
(Italy) Ombra Racing	Dallara F306	Mugen-Honda	63	(Italy) Federico Glorioso	5
(United Kingdom) Räikkönen Robertson Racing	Dallara F307	Mercedes	64	(Venezuela) Johnny Cecotto Jr.	6
(Switzerland) Swiss Racing Team	Dallara F306	Opel	69	(Netherlands) Dominick Muermans	5

== Calendar ==
Round	Circuit	Date	Pole position	Fastest lap	Winning driver	Winning team	National Class Winner
1	(United Kingdom) Oulton Park	9 April	(Germany) Maro Engel	(Sweden) Sebastian Hohenthal	(Germany) Maro Engel	(United Kingdom) Carlin Motorsport	(China) Congfu Cheng
2	(United Kingdom) Oulton Park	9 April	(United Kingdom) Jonathan Kennard	(United Kingdom) Jonathan Kennard	(Estonia) Marko Asmer	(United Kingdom) HiTech Racing	(China) Congfu Cheng
3	(United Kingdom) Donington Park	22 April	(Estonia) Marko Asmer	(Estonia) Marko Asmer	(Estonia) Marko Asmer	(United Kingdom) HiTech Racing	(United Kingdom) Michael Meadows
4	(United Kingdom) Donington Park	22 April	(Estonia) Marko Asmer	(Sweden) Sebastian Hohenthal	(Estonia) Marko Asmer	(United Kingdom) HiTech Racing	(Mexico) Sergio Pérez
5	(Romania) Bucharest	20 May	(Estonia) Marko Asmer	(Estonia) Marko Asmer	(Estonia) Marko Asmer	(United Kingdom) HiTech Racing	(United Kingdom) Michael Meadows
6	(Romania) Bucharest	20 May	(United Kingdom) Stephen Jelley	(Republic of Ireland) Michael Devaney	(United Kingdom) Sam Bird	(United Kingdom) Carlin Motorsport	(Mexico) Sergio Pérez
7	(United Kingdom) Snetterton	3 June	(Finland) Atte Mustonen	(United Kingdom) Stephen Jelley	(Republic of Ireland) Niall Breen	(United Kingdom) Carlin Motorsport	(Mexico) Sergio Pérez
8	(United Kingdom) Snetterton	3 June	(Estonia) Marko Asmer	(Estonia) Marko Asmer	(Estonia) Marko Asmer	(United Kingdom) HiTech Racing	(Iceland) Viktor Jensen
9	(Italy) Monza	24 June	(Germany) Maro Engel	(United Kingdom) Stephen Jelley	(Germany) Maro Engel	(United Kingdom) Carlin Motorsport	(Mexico) Sergio Pérez
10	(Italy) Monza	24 June	(Germany) Maro Engel	(Brazil) Alberto Valerio	(Estonia) Marko Asmer	(United Kingdom) HiTech Racing	(Mexico) Sergio Pérez
11	(United Kingdom) Brands Hatch	15 July	(Estonia) Marko Asmer	(Estonia) Marko Asmer	(Estonia) Marko Asmer	(United Kingdom) HiTech Racing	(China) Congfu Cheng
12	(United Kingdom) Brands Hatch	15 July	(Estonia) Marko Asmer	(United Kingdom) Sam Bird	(Sweden) Sebastian Hohenthal	(United Kingdom) Fortec Motorsport	(China) Congfu Cheng
13	(Belgium) Spa-Francorchamps	29 July	(United Kingdom) Stephen Jelley	(United Kingdom) Jonathan Kennard	(United Kingdom) Sam Bird	(United Kingdom) Carlin Motorsport	(Mexico) Sergio Pérez
14	(Belgium) Spa-Francorchamps	29 July	(United Kingdom) Jonathan Kennard	(United Kingdom) Jonathan Kennard	(United Kingdom) Jonathan Kennard	(United Kingdom) Räikkönen Robertson Racing	(Mexico) Sergio Pérez
15	(United Kingdom) Silverstone	12 August	(Estonia) Marko Asmer	(Estonia) Marko Asmer	(Estonia) Marko Asmer	(United Kingdom) HiTech Racing	(Mexico) Sergio Pérez
16	(United Kingdom) Silverstone	12 August	(Estonia) Marko Asmer	(Estonia) Marko Asmer	(Estonia) Marko Asmer	(United Kingdom) HiTech Racing	(Mexico) Sergio Pérez
17	(United Kingdom) Thruxton	26 August	(Sweden) Sebastian Hohenthal	(Finland) Atte Mustonen	(United Kingdom) Stephen Jelley	(United Kingdom) Räikkönen Robertson Racing	(Mexico) Sergio Pérez
18	(United Kingdom) Thruxton	26 August	(Finland) Atte Mustonen	(Venezuela) Rodolfo González	(Finland) Atte Mustonen	(United Kingdom) Räikkönen Robertson Racing	(Mexico) Sergio Pérez
19	(United Kingdom) Croft	9 September	(Estonia) Marko Asmer	(Estonia) Marko Asmer	(United Kingdom) Stephen Jelley	(United Kingdom) Räikkönen Robertson Racing	(China) Congfu Cheng
20	(United Kingdom) Croft	9 September	(Estonia) Marko Asmer	(Estonia) Marko Asmer	(Estonia) Marko Asmer	(United Kingdom) HiTech Racing	(Mexico) Sergio Pérez
21	(United Kingdom) Rockingham	30 September	(Estonia) Marko Asmer	(Estonia) Marko Asmer	(Estonia) Marko Asmer	(United Kingdom) HiTech Racing	(Mexico) Sergio Pérez
22	(United Kingdom) Rockingham	30 September	(Germany) Maro Engel	(Germany) Maro Engel	(Germany) Maro Engel	(United Kingdom) Carlin Motorsport	(Mexico) Sergio Pérez

== Standings ==
=== Championship Class ===
Pos	Driver	OUL (United Kingdom)		DON (United Kingdom)		BUC (Romania)		SNE (United Kingdom)		MNZ (Italy)		BRH (United Kingdom)		SPA (Belgium)		SIL (United Kingdom)		THR (United Kingdom)		CRO (United Kingdom)		ROC (United Kingdom)		Pts
1	(Estonia) Marko Asmer	2	1	1	1	1	5	Ret	1	4	1	1	3	6	8	1	1	9	5	Ret	1	1	Ret	293
2	(Germany) Maro Engel	1	5	7	4	5	Ret	7	4	1	2	5	7	Ret	2	2	2	3	4	Ret	5	10	1	208
3	(United Kingdom) Stephen Jelley	3	2	2	25	7	3	4	5	11	18	2	6	3	4	5	10	1	7	1	8	9	8	183
4	(United Kingdom) Sam Bird	4	6	10	9	3	1	2	3	2	3	Ret	11	1	3	6	6	Ret	Ret	2	Ret	Ret	2	180
5	(Republic of Ireland) Niall Breen	9	10	Ret	2	4	2	1	7	7	4	6	5	7	9	7	9	12	2	Ret	2	6	9	145
6	(United Kingdom) Jonathan Kennard	6	4	5	3	9	8	6	11	5	5	3	10	2	1	10	16	2	12	Ret	16	Ret	14	130
7	(Finland) Atte Mustonen	8	14	9	8	6	Ret	27	8	Ret	23	14	2	4	6	3	Ret	Ret	1	4	3	2	5	126
8	(Brazil) Alberto Valerio	11	DNS	11	5	2	Ret	3	2	3	27	Ret	8	Ret	7	Ret	5	5	10	5	4	8	6	114
9	(Sweden) Sebastian Hohenthal	5	3	4	23	Ret	7	8	6	Ret	6	16	1	19	11	9	8	Ret	11	Ret	10	3	3	101
10	(United Kingdom) Greg Mansell	10	7	3	13	Ret	Ret	9	9	Ret	9	9	Ret	10	23	4	3	6	8	3	6	23	10	79
11	(Venezuela) Rodolfo González	7	9	12	6	10	10	5	Ret	18	Ret	4	18	5	10	Ret	7	7	3	8	9	4	11	77
12	(Republic of Ireland) Michael Devaney	22	16	26	7	16	6	10	Ret	8	8	7	4	11	12	8	4	8	Ret	7	Ret	12	Ret	54
13	(Argentina) Esteban Guerrieri	12	11	6	22	8	18	14	Ret	6	11	Ret	Ret	8	Ret	13	11	4	9	Ret	7	13	4	46
14	(Brazil) Mario Moraes	21	21	8	Ret	11	9	12	10	9	14	8	12	Ret	5	Ret	19	13	6	6	Ret	5	7	43
15	(Australia) John Martin	16	12	Ret	18	14	4	Ret	12	16	13	Ret	13	20	18	Ret	13	Ret	17	12	11	7	12	16
16	(Austria) Walter Grubmüller	13	8	14	Ret	DNS	DNS	15	13	15	Ret	10	9	12	13	12	Ret	11	Ret	Ret	Ret	11	18	7
17	(United Kingdom) Leo Mansell	20	Ret	Ret	Ret	Ret	Ret	17	DNS	19	24	20	22	21	27	15	15	14	16	10	14	18	19	2
18	(United Kingdom) Max Chilton			20	17	19	19	11	14	13	16	11	20	17	14	Ret	26	20	Ret	Ret	Ret	15	22	0
19	(United Kingdom) Alistair Jackson													13	16	14	17	19	Ret	Ret	12	16	17	0
20	(Angola) Ricardo Teixeira	Ret	19	16	15	21	17	16	17	Ret	Ret	15	15	24	Ret	16	18	Ret	15	Ret	17	17	15	0
21	(South Africa) Sean Petterson					23	20	DNS	15	Ret	20	17	17	Ret	22									0
22	(Italy) Francesco Castellacci	Ret	20	22	Ret	Ret	Ret	Ret	22	22	Ret	26	Ret	22	21	19	24	21	Ret	Ret	18	21	20	0
	(Macau) Rodolfo Ávila	Ret	DNS																					0
	(South Africa) Cristiano Morgado			DNS	DNS																			0
Guest drivers ineligible for points
	(Italy) Matteo Chinosi									12	12													0
	(Italy) Federico Glorioso									17	21													0
	(Netherlands) Dominick Muermans									Ret	Ret													0
	(Venezuela) Johnny Cecotto Jr.											DNS	DNS											0
National Class
1	(Mexico) Sergio Pérez	Ret	DNS	15	10	13	11	13	20	10	7	13	16	9	15	11	12	10	13	11	13	14	13	376
2	(China) Congfu Cheng	14	13	18	12	Ret	13	20	18	14	10	12	14	14	17	Ret	14	17	Ret	9	15			267
3	(Bahrain) Hamed Al Fardan	Ret	DNS	21	24	15	Ret	18	19	Ret	15	23	19	15	20	18	20	15	18	14	19	20	Ret	182
4	(United Kingdom) Michael Meadows	18	DNS	13	11	12	Ret	24	DNS	20	17	19	24	16	19	Ret	21	16	Ret	Ret	Ret			153
5	(Bahrain) Salman Al Khalifa	DNS	17	23	16	24	14	21	25			21	23	18	25	Ret	Ret	18	14	13	22	19	16	149
6	(Iceland) Viktor Jensen	17	15	25	20	18	12	25	16	23	28	18	26	23	Ret	Ret	23	23	19	Ret	23			133
7	(Mexico) Juan Pablo Garcia	Ret	DNS	27	Ret	20	15	23	24	26	19	25	25	26	26	20	22	22	20	16	21			93
8	(United Kingdom) Alex Waters	19	DNS	19	Ret	22	16	26	23	21	22	24	21	25	24									74
9	(United Kingdom) Alistair Jackson	Ret	18	17	19	Ret	Ret	19	21	25	25	22	Ret											62
10	(Brazil) Ernesto Otero															17	25			15	20			37
11	(Spain) Albert Costa	Ret	DNS	24	21	17	Ret	22	26	24	26													33
12	(South Africa) Sean Petterson	15	DNS	Ret	14																			25
13	(Romania) Mihai Marinescu																					22	21	22
14	(United Kingdom) Richard Singleton																					24	23	18
Pos	Driver	OUL (United Kingdom)		DON (United Kingdom)		BUC (Romania)		SNE (United Kingdom)		MNZ (Italy)		BRH (United Kingdom)		SPA (Belgium)		SIL (United Kingdom)		THR (United Kingdom)		CRO (United Kingdom)		ROC (United Kingdom)		Pts

Colour	Result
Gold	Winner
Silver	Second place
Bronze	Third place
Green	Points classification
Blue	Non-points classification
Blue	Non-classified finish (NC)
Purple	Retired, not classified (Ret)
Red	Did not qualify (DNQ)
Red	Did not pre-qualify (DNPQ)
Black	Disqualified (DSQ)
White	Did not start (DNS)
White	Withdrew (WD)
White	Race cancelled (C)
Blank	Did not practice (DNP)
Blank	Did not arrive (DNA)
Blank	Excluded (EX)
