= Performance Racing =

Swedish racing team

(Sweden) Performance Racing
- Founded: 1999
- Team principal(s): Bobby Issazadhe
- Former series: Europa Cup Formula Opel; German Formula 3 Swedish Formula 3 Formula 3 European Cup; British Formula 3 A1 Grand Prix; International Formula Master
- Teams' Championships: 2001 British F3 B Class; 2004 British F3 B Class; 2006 British F3 B Class

Performance Racing is a Swedish racing team based in Great Britain, involved in many areas of motorsport. The team has been managed since 1999 by Bobby Issazadhe.

== History ==
The Performance Racing business was founded in Sweden, in 1999, to concentrate various motorsport activities into one source. The business was bought by Issazadhe in 2000 to manage his own racing team.

In the beginning, in 1999 and 2000, the team ran in Europa Cup Formula Opel. It also became involved in Formula Three in Germany, Sweden and Great Britain.

During the 2006–07 A1 Grand Prix season, Performance Racing managed the A1 Team Pakistan in the A1 Grand Prix World Cup of Motorsport. In January 2008, the team became the managers of A1 Team Indonesia.

The team joined the International Formula Master championship in 2008.

== Results ==
A1 Grand Prix Results
Year	Car	Team	Races	Wins	Poles	Fast laps	Points	T.C.
2006–07	Lola A1GP-Zytek	A1 Team Pakistan	22	0	0	0	1	22nd
2007–08	Lola A1GP-Zytek	A1 Team Pakistan	20	0	0	0	1	20th
2007–08	Lola A1GP-Zytek	A1 Team Indonesia	20	0	0	0	1	21st
2008–09	A1GP-Ferrari	A1 Team Indonesia	14	0	0	0	3	20th

British Formula 3 Championship results
Year	Car	Drivers	Wins	Poles	Fast laps	Points	D.C.	T.C.
2001	Dallara F398-Spiess Opel	(United Kingdom) Matthew Gilmore	6	7	8	333	2nd [B]	1st [B]
2001	Dallara F398-Spiess Opel	(United Kingdom) Justin Sherwood	0	0	0	119	8th [B]	1st [B]
2001	Dallara F398-Spiess Opel	(United Kingdom) Adam Blair	0	0	0	87	9th [B]	1st [B]
2001	Dallara F398-Spiess Opel	(Sweden) Bobby Issazadhe	0	0	0	0	NC [B]	1st [B]
2001	Dallara F398-Spiess Opel	(United Kingdom) Iain Brown	0	1	0	0	NC [B]	1st [B]
2002	Dallara F301-Spiess Opel	(United Kingdom) Justin Sherwood	1	0	0	130	8th [B]	4th [B]
2002	Dallara F301-Spiess Opel	(France) Julien Schell	0	0	0	4	18th [B]	4th [B]
2003	Dallara F301-Spiess Opel	(United Kingdom) Justin Sherwood	0	0	1	178	4th [B]	3rd [B]
2003	Dallara F301-Spiess Opel	(Canada) Jesse Mason	0	0	0	17	10th [B]	3rd [B]
2004	Dallara F301-Spiess Opel	(United Kingdom) Stephen Jelley	0	0	4	266	2nd [B]	1st [B]
2004	Dallara F301-Spiess Opel	(Australia) Barton Mawer	0	0	1	134	4th [B]	1st [B]
2004	Dallara F301-Spiess Opel	(Republic of Ireland) Ronayne O'Mahony	0	0	0	121	5th [B]	1st [B]
2005	Dallara F304-Mugen Honda	(United Kingdom) Adam Langley-Khan	0	0	0	18	11th [B]	9th [B]
2005	Dallara F304-Mugen Honda	(Sweden) Suk Sandher	0	0	0	10	12th [B]	9th [B]
2005	Dallara F304-Mugen Honda	(United Kingdom) James Jakes	0	0	0	4	13th [B]	9th [B]
2006	Dallara F304-Mugen Honda	(Finland) Juho Annala	3	3	1	258	3rd [B]	1st [B]
2006	Dallara F304-Mugen Honda	(Macau) Rodolfo Ávila	0	1	0	182	4th [B]	1st [B]
2006	Dallara F304-Mugen Honda	(Angola) Ricardo Teixeira	0	0	0	46	7th [B] †	1st [B]
2007	Dallara F307-Mugen Honda	(Angola) Ricardo Teixeira	0	0	0	0	NC	NC
2007	Dallara F307-Mugen Honda	(Macau) Rodolfo Ávila	0	0	0	0	NC [B]	NC
2007	Dallara F304-Mugen Honda	(China) Cheng Congfu	5	4	8	267	2nd [B]	2nd [B]
2007	Dallara F304-Mugen Honda	(Bahrain) Hamad Al Fardan	0	0	0	182	3rd [B]	2nd [B]

German Formula Three Championship results
Year	Car	Drivers	Wins	Poles	Fast laps	Points	D.C.	T.C.
2003	Dallara F399-Spiess Opel	(Netherlands) Ross Zwolsman	0	0	0	27	10th	9th
2003	Dallara F300-Spiess Opel	(United Kingdom) Justin Sherwood	0	0	0	9	15th	9th
2003	Dallara F399-Spiess Opel	(United Kingdom) Adam Langley-Khan	0	0	0	2	23rd	9th
2003	Dallara F399-Spiess Opel	(Canada) Jesse Mason	0	0	0	0	NC	9th
2005	Dallara F304-Mugen Honda	(United Kingdom) Adam Langley-Khan	0	0	0	1	17th	11th
2006	Dallara F306-Mugen Honda	(Macau) Rodolfo Ávila	0	0	0	0	NC	NC
2006	Dallara F304-Mugen Honda	(Finland) Juho Annala	0	0	0	12	14th [T]	11th [T]

Formula Three Special races results
Year	Car	Race	Driver	Pole	Fast lap	Pos.
2004	Dallara F399-Spiess Opel	F3 European Cup	(Republic of Ireland) Ronayne O'Mahony			17th
2004	Dallara F399-Spiess Opel	F3 European Cup	(United Kingdom) Stephen Jelley			19th
2006	Dallara F306-Mugen Honda	F3 Macau Grand Prix	(Macau) Rodolfo Ávila			DNF
2007	Dallara F307-Mugen Honda	Masters of Formula 3	(Angola) Ricardo Teixeira			24th

- [B] The team race the British Formula 3 B/National Class Championship.
- [T] The team race the German Formula 3 Trophy Class Championship.
- † These drivers also drove for other teams during the season and their final positions include all team results.
- D.C. = Drivers' Championship position, T.C. = Teams' Championship position.

== Timeline ==
Type	1990s	2000s
Type	99	00	01	02	03	04	05	06	07	08
Formulas	Formula Opel		British Formula 3 Championship
Formulas					Ger. F3		German F3			Formula Master
Formulas								A1 Grand Prix
