= Alistair Jackson =

British racing driver

Alastair Jackson
- Nationality: Irish
- Born: 17 November 1988 (age 37) Glengormley (Northern Ireland)

Firestone Indy Lights Series
- Years active: 2009
- Teams: Guthrie Meyer Racing; RLR-Andersen Racing
- Starts: 11
- Wins: 0
- Poles: 0
- Best finish: 16th in 2009

Previous series
- 2007–08 2006: British Formula Three Championship; Asian Formula Three Championship

Alastair "Ali" Jackson (born 17 November 1988) is a Northern Irish racing driver.

Jackson raced in the Asian Formula Three Championship in 2006 and finished third in points with four victories, becoming the youngest driver to win in series history. In 2007, he drove part-time in the British Formula Three national class for Räikkönen Robertson Racing and finished ninth in points and made ten additional starts in the British F3 International Series and competed in the F3 Masters at Circuit Zandvoort and finished 22nd. In 2008, he competed part-time in the British F3 International class and finished seventeenth in points. After nine races, he switched teams from Räikkönen Robertson to Ultimate Motorsport. In 2009, he signed on to drive for Guthrie Meyer Racing in the Firestone Indy Lights Series. After the first oval race of the season at Kansas Speedway which saw Alistair getting caught in two crashes, severely damaging two cars, Jackson left Guthrie-Meyer and signed on with RLR-Andersen Racing for the remainder of the season, however his car failed to appear at the penultimate round of the championship at Chicagoland Speedway, ending his season. His best finish was sixth at Long Beach and he finished sixteenth in points.

== American open–wheel racing results ==
(key)

=== Indy Lights ===
Year	Team	1	2	3	4	5	6	7	8	9	10	11	12	13	14	15	Rank	Points	Ref
2009	Guthrie Meyer Racing	STP1; 11	STP2; 20	LBH; 6	KAN; 20												16th	172	
2009	RLR/Andersen Racing					INDY; 19	MIL	IOW	WGL; 15	TOR; 11	EDM; 15	KTY; 14	MOH; 16	SNM; 15	CHI	HMS	16th	172	
