= Guthrie Meyer Racing =

Guthrie Meyer Racing is a former Firestone Indy Lights Series team.

The team started in 2005 as Guthrie Racing owned by 1997 IndyCar Series “Rookie of the Year” winner and 1997 Phoenix race winner Jim Guthrie. The team began running in the Star Mazda Pro Series in 2005 with numerous podium and top 10 finishes. In 2006, the team moved into the Indy Pro Series (now called the Firestone Indy Lights Series) and made headlines quickly by winning the second and third races of the season on the Streets of St. Petersburg with driver Raphael Matos.

The team continued on into 2007 and ran a two car effort for most of the season, running Sean Guthrie, Jim Guthrie's 20-year-old son, for the entire year and Tom Wieringa for the majority of the races.

Guthrie Racing ran four cars for the 2008 season in the Firestone Indy Lights Series with drivers Sean Guthrie, Logan Gomez, Franck Perera and Micky Gilbert. The 4th car has also been driven by Robbie Pecorari who achieved a 2nd-place finish at Kansas Speedway after starting 23rd on the grid, and Tom Wieringa who made history by becoming the oldest driver to compete in the series at age 52. Franck Perera joined the team beginning at the Iowa race June 21, 2008 after losing his IndyCar Series ride with Conquest Racing due to his sponsor going bankrupt. He captured the team's only win of the season in one of the two races held at Infineon Raceway.

Prior to the 2009 Indy Lights season, Louis (Butch) Meyer III bought into the team and it became Guthrie Meyer Racing.

The team began the 2009 season fielding three cars with drivers Alistair Jackson, Jesse Mason, and Sean Guthrie. The fourth race of the season at Kansas Speedway was disastrous for the team as Jackson and Mason were involved in three heavy crashes and Sean Guthrie as well as his father Jim were suspended indefinitely for conduct detrimental to the sport. Jackson subsequently left the team and they arrived at the next race, the Freedom 100, with only a single car for Mason. The team shut down after the Freedom 100.
