= 2006 Formula BMW World Final =

Race details
Date	24–26 November 2006
Official name	2nd Dell Formula BMW World Final
Location	Cheste, Valencia, Spain
Course	Permanent racing facility 4.005 km (2.489 mi)
Distance	Heat Races; 12 laps, 48.060 km (29.863 mi); Main Race; 18 laps, 72.090 km (44.795 mi)
- Main Race

Pole
Driver	(Germany) Christian Vietoris	Josef Kaufmann Racing

Podium
First	(Germany) Christian Vietoris	Josef Kaufmann Racing
Second	(Finland) Mika Mäki	Eifelland Racing
Third	(Monaco) Stefano Coletti	EuroInternational

The 2006 Formula BMW World Final was the second Formula BMW World Final race and held for the first time at Circuit Ricardo Tormo in Cheste near Valencia on 24–26 November 2006. The race was won by Josef Kaufmann Racing's driver Christian Vietoris, who finished ahead Mika Mäki and Stefano Coletti.

== Drivers and teams ==
2006 Entry List
Team	No	Driver	Main series
(Canada) AIM Autosport	2	(Canada) Philip Major	Formula BMW USA
(Canada) AIM Autosport	3	(Canada) Daniel Morad	Formula BMW USA
(Germany) AM-Holzer Rennsport GmbH	4	(Republic of Ireland) Niall Quinn	Formula BMW ADAC
(Germany) AM-Holzer Rennsport GmbH	41	(Germany) Tobias Hegewald	Formula BMW ADAC
(Germany) ASL Team Mücke Motorsport	5	(Netherlands) Nick de Bruijn	Formula BMW ADAC
(Germany) ASL Team Mücke Motorsport	6	(Germany) Christian Engelhart	Formula BMW ADAC
(Canada) Team Autotecnica	7	(United States) Matt Lee	Formula BMW USA
(Germany) Eifelland Racing	8	(Germany) Jens Klingmann	Formula BMW ADAC
(Germany) Eifelland Racing	9	(Finland) Mika Mäki	Formula BMW ADAC
(Germany) Eifelland Racing	10	(Austria) Martin Ragginger	Formula BMW ADAC
(United States) EuroInternational	11	(Monaco) Stefano Coletti	Formula BMW USA
(United States) EuroInternational	12	(Canada) Robert Wickens	Formula BMW USA
(United Kingdom) Filsell Motorsport	14	(United Kingdom) Matt Howson	Formula BMW UK
(United Kingdom) Filsell Motorsport	15	(Republic of Ireland) Daniel Murray	Formula BMW UK
(United Kingdom) Fortec Motorsport	16	(United Kingdom) Henry Arundel	Formula BMW UK
(United Kingdom) Fortec Motorsport	17	(Republic of Ireland) Niall Breen	Formula BMW UK
(United Kingdom) Fortec Motorsport	18	(United Kingdom) Jack Clarke	Formula BMW UK
(United Kingdom) Fortec Motorsport	19	(United Kingdom) Euan Hankey	Formula BMW UK
(United Kingdom) Fortec Motorsport	20	(United Kingdom) Daniel McKenzie	Formula BMW UK
(United Kingdom) Fortec Motorsport	21	(Australia) Daniel Ricciardo	Formula BMW UK
(United States) Gelles Racing	22	(United Kingdom) Ross Curnow	Formula BMW USA
(United States) Gelles Racing	24	(Canada) Adrien Herberts	Formula BMW USA
(United States) Gelles Racing	25	(Canada) Maxime Pelletier	Formula BMW USA
(United States) Gelles Racing	26	(United States) Ryan Phinny	Formula BMW USA
(United States) Gelles Racing	27	(Colombia) Sebastián Saavedra	Formula BMW USA
(Germany) GU-Racing Motorsport Team	28	(Romania) Andrei Harnagea	Formula BMW ADAC
(Germany) GU-Racing Motorsport Team	29	(Germany) Jens Höing	Formula BMW ADAC
(Germany) GU-Racing Motorsport Team	30	(Germany) Max Wissel	Formula BMW ADAC
(Canada) Jensen MotorSport	31	(United States) Frankie Muniz	Formula BMW USA
(Germany) Josef Kaufmann Racing	32	(Spain) Daniel Campos-Hull	Formula BMW ADAC
(Germany) Josef Kaufmann Racing	33	(Czech Republic) Josef Král	Formula BMW ADAC
(Germany) Josef Kaufmann Racing	34	(Germany) Christian Vietoris	Formula BMW ADAC
(United Kingdom) Team Loctite	35	(United Kingdom) Tom Dunstan	Formula BMW UK
(United Kingdom) Team Loctite	36	(United Kingdom) Oliver Turvey	Formula BMW UK
(Finland) Matson Motorsport	37	(Switzerland) Fabio Leimer	Formula BMW ADAC
(United Kingdom) Motaworld Racing	39	(United Kingdom) Matt Hamilton	Formula BMW UK
(United Kingdom) Motaworld Racing	40	(United Kingdom) Jonathan Legris	Formula BMW UK

== Qualifying ==
=== Group 1 ===
Pos	No	Driver	Team	Time	Group
1	34	(Germany) Christian Vietoris	Josef Kaufmann Racing	1:38.556	SP
2	33	(Czech Republic) Josef Král	Josef Kaufmann Racing	1:38.991	SP
3	3	(Canada) Daniel Morad	AIM Autosport	1:39.416	SP
4	5	(Netherlands) Nick de Bruijn	ASL Team Mücke Motorsport	1:39.744	SP
5	36	(United Kingdom) Oliver Turvey	Team Loctite	1:39.767	B
6	19	(United Kingdom) Euan Hankey	Fortec Motorsport	1:39.789	D
7	41	(Germany) Tobias Hegewald	AM-Holzer Rennsport GmbH	1:40.036	B
8	32	(Spain) Daniel Campos-Hull	Josef Kaufmann Racing	1:40.254	D
9	4	(Republic of Ireland) Niall Quinn	AM-Holzer Rennsport GmbH	1:40.297	B
10	37	(Switzerland) Fabio Leimer	Matson Motorsport	1:40.330	D
11	16	(United Kingdom) Henry Arundel	Fortec Motorsport	1:40.385	B
12	7	(United States) Matt Lee	Team Autotecnica	1:40.549	D
13	20	(United Kingdom) Daniel McKenzie	Fortec Motorsport	1:40.880	B
14	25	(Canada) Maxime Pelletier	Gelles Racing	1:40.904	D
15	31	(United States) Frankie Muniz	Jensen MotorSport	1:41.328	B
16	2	(Canada) Philip Major	AIM Autosport	1:41.403	D
17	27	(Colombia) Sebastián Saavedra	Gelles Racing	1:41.500	B
18	35	(United Kingdom) Tom Dunstan	Team Loctite	1:42.153	D

=== Group 2 ===
Pos	No	Driver	Team	Time	Group
1	9	(Finland) Mika Mäki	Eifelland Racing	1:39.061	SP
2	11	(Monaco) Stefano Coletti	EuroInternational	1:39.121	SP
3	10	(Austria) Martin Ragginger	Eifelland Racing	1:39.136	SP
4	12	(Canada) Robert Wickens	EuroInternational	1:39.202	SP
5	8	(Germany) Jens Klingmann	Eifelland Racing	1:39.287	A
6	15	(Republic of Ireland) Daniel Murray	Filsell Motorsport	1:39.342	C
7	21	(Australia) Daniel Ricciardo	Fortec Motorsport	1:39.450	A
8	6	(Germany) Christian Engelhart	ASL Team Mücke Motorsport	1:39.573	C
9	40	(United Kingdom) Jonathan Legris	Motaworld Racing	1:39.907	A
10	26	(United States) Ryan Phinny	Gelles Racing	1:39.993	C
11	39	(United Kingdom) Matt Hamilton	Motaworld Racing	1:40.089	A
12	30	(Germany) Max Wissel	GU-Racing Motorsport Team	1:40.126	C
13	29	(Germany) Jens Höing	GU-Racing Motorsport Team	1:40.246	A
14	17	(Republic of Ireland) Niall Breen	Fortec Motorsport	1:40.268	C
15	18	(United Kingdom) Jack Clarke	Fortec Motorsport	1:40.314	A
16	22	(United Kingdom) Ross Curnow	Gelles Racing	1:40.343	C
17	24	(Canada) Adrien Herberts	Gelles Racing	1:40.813	A
18	28	(Romania) Andrei Harnagea	GU-Racing Motorsport Team	1:47.849	C
19	14	(United Kingdom) Matt Howson	Filsell Motorsport	Withdrawn	

=== Super Pole Competition ===
Pos	No	Driver	Team	Time	Group
1	9	(Finland) Mika Mäki	Eifelland Racing	1:39.695	A
2	34	(Germany) Christian Vietoris	Josef Kaufmann Racing	1:40.059	B
3	10	(Austria) Martin Ragginger	Eifelland Racing	1:40.471	A
4	11	(Monaco) Stefano Coletti	EuroInternational	1:40.790	C
5	33	(Czech Republic) Josef Král	Josef Kaufmann Racing	1:41.062	D
6	12	(Canada) Robert Wickens	EuroInternational	1:41.106	C
7	3	(Canada) Daniel Morad	AIM Autosport	1:41.533	B
8	5	(Netherlands) Nick de Bruijn	ASL Team Mücke Motorsport	1:42.180	D

== Heats ==
=== Heat 1 (A vs B) ===
Pos	No	Name	Team	Laps	Time/Retired	Points
1	34	(Germany) Christian Vietoris	Josef Kaufmann Racing	12	20:05.177	0
2	10	(Austria) Martin Ragginger	Eifelland Racing	12	+4.1	2
3	9	(Finland) Mika Mäki	Eifelland Racing	12	+7.2	3
4	3	(Canada) Daniel Morad	AIM Autosport	12	+7.9	4
5	8	(Germany) Jens Klingmann	Eifelland Racing	12	+8.2	5
6	40	(United Kingdom) Jonathan Legris	Motaworld Racing	12	+10.5	6
7	36	(United Kingdom) Oliver Turvey	Team Loctite	12	+10.6	7
8	21	(Australia) Daniel Ricciardo	Fortec Motorsport	12	+10.9	8
9	41	(Germany) Tobias Hegewald	AM-Holzer Rennsport GmbH	12	+14.8	9
10	4	(Republic of Ireland) Niall Quinn	AM-Holzer Rennsport GmbH	12	+20.1	10
11	16	(United Kingdom) Henry Arundel	Fortec Motorsport	12	+20.3	11
12	39	(United Kingdom) Matt Hamilton	Motaworld Racing	12	+21.9	12
13	27	(Colombia) Sebastián Saavedra	Gelles Racing	12	+24.8	13
14	29	(Germany) Jens Höing	GU-Racing Motorsport Team	12	+26.3	14
15	20	(United Kingdom) Daniel McKenzie	Fortec Motorsport	12	+27.4	15
16	31	(United States) Frankie Muniz	Jensen MotorSport	12	+30.5	16
17	24	(Canada) Adrien Herberts	Gelles Racing	12	+30.8	17
EX	18	(United Kingdom) Jack Clarke	Fortec Motorsport	12	+27.1	23

=== Heat 2 (C vs D) ===
Pos	No	Name	Team	Laps	Time/Retired	Points
1	33	(Czech Republic) Josef Král	Josef Kaufmann Racing	12	20:07.295	0
2	11	(Monaco) Stefano Coletti	EuroInternational	12	+3.3	2
3	12	(Canada) Robert Wickens	EuroInternational	12	+3.7	3
4	15	(Republic of Ireland) Daniel Murray	Filsell Motorsport	12	+8.6	4
5	19	(United Kingdom) Euan Hankey	Fortec Motorsport	12	+9.1	5
6	6	(Germany) Christian Engelhart	ASL Team Mücke Motorsport	12	+10.0	6
7	32	(Spain) Daniel Campos-Hull	Josef Kaufmann Racing	12	+11.2	7
8	26	(United States) Ryan Phinny	Gelles Racing	12	+15.8	8
9	7	(United States) Matt Lee	Team Autotecnica	12	+16.8	9
10	17	(Republic of Ireland) Niall Breen	Fortec Motorsport	12	+20.1	10
11	22	(United Kingdom) Ross Curnow	Gelles Racing	12	+22.6	11
12	30	(Germany) Max Wissel	GU-Racing Motorsport Team	12	+23.5	12
13	25	(Canada) Maxime Pelletier	Gelles Racing	12	+25.3	13
14	2	(Canada) Philip Major	AIM Autosport	12	+32.9	14
15	28	(Romania) Andrei Harnagea	GU-Racing Motorsport Team	12	+1:21.2	15
Ret	5	(Netherlands) Nick de Bruijn	ASL Team Mücke Motorsport	0	+12 laps	16
EX	37	(Switzerland) Fabio Leimer	Matson Motorsport	12	+14.2	21
EX	35	(United Kingdom) Tom Dunstan	Team Loctite	12	+32.4	21

=== Heat 3 (A vs C) ===
Pos	No	Name	Team	Laps	Time/Retired	Points
1	9	(Finland) Mika Mäki	Eifelland Racing	12	20:12.031	0
2	12	(Canada) Robert Wickens	EuroInternational	12	+7.9	2
3	11	(Monaco) Stefano Coletti	EuroInternational	12	+7.9	3
4	8	(Germany) Jens Klingmann	Eifelland Racing	12	+8.5	4
5	21	(Australia) Daniel Ricciardo	Fortec Motorsport	12	+11.9	5
6	40	(United Kingdom) Jonathan Legris	Motaworld Racing	12	+13.3	6
7	39	(United Kingdom) Matt Hamilton	Motaworld Racing	12	+17.0	7
8	15	(Republic of Ireland) Daniel Murray	Filsell Motorsport	12	+22.6	8
9	26	(United States) Ryan Phinny	Gelles Racing	12	+22.9	9
10	29	(Germany) Jens Höing	GU-Racing Motorsport Team	12	+25.9	10
11	24	(Canada) Adrien Herberts	Gelles Racing	12	+38.6	11
12	6	(Germany) Christian Engelhart	ASL Team Mücke Motorsport	12	+42.7	12
13	17	(Republic of Ireland) Niall Breen	Fortec Motorsport	12	+44.0	13
14	22	(United Kingdom) Ross Curnow	Gelles Racing	12	+44.8	14
15	28	(Romania) Andrei Harnagea	GU-Racing Motorsport Team	12	+1:31.0	15
Ret	10	(Austria) Martin Ragginger	Eifelland Racing	6	+6 laps	16
Ret	30	(Germany) Max Wissel	GU-Racing Motorsport Team	6	+6 laps	17
Ret	18	(United Kingdom) Jack Clarke	Fortec Motorsport	0	+12 laps	18

=== Heat 4 (B vs D) ===
Pos	No	Name	Team	Laps	Time/Retired	Points
1	34	(Germany) Christian Vietoris	Josef Kaufmann Racing	12	20:09.251	0
2	33	(Czech Republic) Josef Král	Josef Kaufmann Racing	12	+3.3	2
3	5	(Netherlands) Nick de Bruijn	ASL Team Mücke Motorsport	12	+5.7	3
4	19	(United Kingdom) Euan Hankey	Fortec Motorsport	12	+7.1	4
5	36	(United Kingdom) Oliver Turvey	Team Loctite	12	+7.6	5
6	3	(Canada) Daniel Morad	AIM Autosport	12	+16.9	6
7	4	(Republic of Ireland) Niall Quinn	AM-Holzer Rennsport GmbH	12	+17.6	7
8	32	(Spain) Daniel Campos-Hull	Josef Kaufmann Racing	12	+18.1	8
9	7	(United States) Matt Lee	Team Autotecnica	12	+18.3	9
10	41	(Germany) Tobias Hegewald	AM-Holzer Rennsport GmbH	12	+19.6	10
11	20	(United Kingdom) Daniel McKenzie	Fortec Motorsport	12	+19.8	11
12	37	(Switzerland) Fabio Leimer	Matson Motorsport	12	+20.1	12
13	27	(Colombia) Sebastián Saavedra	Gelles Racing	12	+22.2	13
14	25	(Canada) Maxime Pelletier	Gelles Racing	12	+22.4	14
15	31	(United States) Frankie Muniz	Jensen MotorSport	12	+29.9	15
16	35	(United Kingdom) Tom Dunstan	Team Loctite	12	+34.3	16
17	16	(United Kingdom) Henry Arundel	Fortec Motorsport	12	+40.7	17
EX	2	(Canada) Philip Major	AIM Autosport	12	+30.3	22

=== Heat 5 (A vs D) ===
Pos	No	Name	Team	Laps	Time/Retired	Points
1	33	(Czech Republic) Josef Král	Josef Kaufmann Racing	12	19:58.140	0
2	9	(Finland) Mika Mäki	Eifelland Racing	12	+2.1	2
3	19	(United Kingdom) Euan Hankey	Fortec Motorsport	12	+3.7	3
4	5	(Netherlands) Nick de Bruijn	ASL Team Mücke Motorsport	12	+9.9	4
5	40	(United Kingdom) Jonathan Legris	Motaworld Racing	12	+11.0	5
6	21	(Australia) Daniel Ricciardo	Fortec Motorsport	12	+11.9	6
7	39	(United Kingdom) Matt Hamilton	Motaworld Racing	12	+14.0	7
8	37	(Switzerland) Fabio Leimer	Matson Motorsport	12	+14.6	8
9	32	(Spain) Daniel Campos-Hull	Josef Kaufmann Racing	12	+17.2	9
10	10	(Austria) Martin Ragginger	Eifelland Racing	12	+20.2	10
11	7	(United States) Matt Lee	Team Autotecnica	12	+21.1	11
12	29	(Germany) Jens Höing	GU-Racing Motorsport Team	12	+24.3	12
13	8	(Germany) Jens Klingmann	Eifelland Racing	12	+24.5	13
14	25	(Canada) Maxime Pelletier	Gelles Racing	12	+24.5	14
15	2	(Canada) Philip Major	AIM Autosport	12	+29.7	15
16	24	(Canada) Adrien Herberts	Gelles Racing	12	+34.2	16
17	35	(United Kingdom) Tom Dunstan	Team Loctite	11	+1 lap	17
EX	18	(United Kingdom) Jack Clarke	Fortec Motorsport	12	+48.7	21

=== Heat 6 (B vs C) ===
Pos	No	Name	Team	Laps	Time/Retired	Points
1	34	(Germany) Christian Vietoris	Josef Kaufmann Racing	12	19:56.727	0
2	11	(Monaco) Stefano Coletti	EuroInternational	12	+6.1	2
3	3	(Canada) Daniel Morad	AIM Autosport	12	+6.9	3
4	36	(United Kingdom) Oliver Turvey	Team Loctite	12	+7.5	4
5	4	(Republic of Ireland) Niall Quinn	AM-Holzer Rennsport GmbH	12	+10.5	5
6	41	(Germany) Tobias Hegewald	AM-Holzer Rennsport GmbH	12	+11.4	6
7	6	(Germany) Christian Engelhart	ASL Team Mücke Motorsport	12	+11.9	7
8	16	(United Kingdom) Henry Arundel	Fortec Motorsport	12	+13.4	8
9	17	(Republic of Ireland) Niall Breen	Fortec Motorsport	12	+13.7	9
10	22	(United Kingdom) Ross Curnow	Gelles Racing	12	+18.3	10
11	27	(Colombia) Sebastián Saavedra	Gelles Racing	12	+20.9	11
12	20	(United Kingdom) Daniel McKenzie	Fortec Motorsport	12	+21.9	12
13	15	(Republic of Ireland) Daniel Murray	Filsell Motorsport	12	+26.0	13
14	31	(United States) Frankie Muniz	Jensen MotorSport	12	+41.7	14
15	28	(Romania) Andrei Harnagea	GU-Racing Motorsport Team	12	+1:20.4	15
16	26	(United States) Ryan Phinny	Gelles Racing	10	+2 laps	16
Ret	30	(Germany) Max Wissel	GU-Racing Motorsport Team	6	+6 laps	17
DNS	12	(Canada) Robert Wickens	EuroInternational	Did not start	Did not start	18

=== Summary ===
Pos	No	Name	Team	Points
1	34	(Germany) Christian Vietoris	Josef Kaufmann Racing	0
2	33	(Czech Republic) Josef Král	Josef Kaufmann Racing	2
3	9	(Finland) Mika Mäki	Eifelland Racing	5
4	11	(Monaco) Stefano Coletti	EuroInternational	7
5	19	(United Kingdom) Euan Hankey	Fortec Motorsport	12
6	3	(Canada) Daniel Morad	AIM Autosport	13
7	36	(United Kingdom) Oliver Turvey	Team Loctite	16
8	40	(United Kingdom) Jonathan Legris	Motaworld Racing	17
9	21	(Australia) Daniel Ricciardo	Fortec Motorsport	19
10	8	(Germany) Jens Klingmann	Eifelland Racing	22
11	4	(Republic of Ireland) Niall Quinn	AM-Holzer Rennsport GmbH	22
12	12	(Canada) Robert Wickens	EuroInternational	23
13	5	(Netherlands) Nick de Bruijn	ASL Team Mücke Motorsport	23
14	32	(Spain) Daniel Campos-Hull	Josef Kaufmann Racing	24
15	15	(Republic of Ireland) Daniel Murray	Filsell Motorsport	25
16	6	(Germany) Christian Engelhart	ASL Team Mücke Motorsport	25
17	41	(Germany) Tobias Hegewald	AM-Holzer Rennsport GmbH	25
18	39	(United Kingdom) Matt Hamilton	Motaworld Racing	26
19	10	(Austria) Martin Ragginger	Eifelland Racing	28
20	7	(United States) Matt Lee	Team Autotecnica	29
21	17	(Republic of Ireland) Niall Breen	Fortec Motorsport	32
22	26	(United States) Ryan Phinny	Gelles Racing	33
23	22	(United Kingdom) Ross Curnow	Gelles Racing	35
24	16	(United Kingdom) Henry Arundel	Fortec Motorsport	36
25	29	(Germany) Jens Höing	GU-Racing Motorsport Team	36
26	27	(Colombia) Sebastián Saavedra	Gelles Racing	37
27	20	(United Kingdom) Daniel McKenzie	Fortec Motorsport	38
28	37	(Switzerland) Fabio Leimer	Matson Motorsport	41
29	25	(Canada) Maxime Pelletier	Gelles Racing	41
30	24	(Canada) Adrien Herberts	Gelles Racing	44
31	31	(United States) Frankie Muniz	Jensen MotorSport	45
32	28	(Romania) Andrei Harnagea	GU-Racing Motorsport Team	45
33	30	(Germany) Max Wissel	GU-Racing Motorsport Team	46
34	2	(Canada) Philip Major	AIM Autosport	51
35	35	(United Kingdom) Tom Dunstan	Team Loctite	54
36	18	(United Kingdom) Jack Clarke	Fortec Motorsport	62

== Final Race ==
Pos	No	Driver	Team	Laps	Time/Retired	Grid
1	34	(Germany) Christian Vietoris	Josef Kaufmann Racing	18	30:07.362	1
2	9	(Finland) Mika Mäki	Eifelland Racing	18	+4.6	3
3	11	(Monaco) Stefano Coletti	EuroInternational	18	+13.2	4
4	3	(Canada) Daniel Morad	AIM Autosport	18	+13.9	6
5	21	(Australia) Daniel Ricciardo	Fortec Motorsport	18	+14.7	9
6	36	(United Kingdom) Oliver Turvey	Team Loctite	18	+17.8	7
7	8	(Germany) Jens Klingmann	Eifelland Racing	18	+19.5	10
8	12	(Canada) Robert Wickens	EuroInternational	18	+20.1	12
9	10	(Austria) Martin Ragginger	Eifelland Racing	18	+21.9	19
10	19	(United Kingdom) Euan Hankey	Fortec Motorsport	18	+24.2	5
11	5	(Netherlands) Nick de Bruijn	ASL Team Mücke Motorsport	18	+27.7	13
12	4	(Republic of Ireland) Niall Quinn	AM-Holzer Rennsport GmbH	18	+30.0	11
13	7	(United States) Matt Lee	Team Autotecnica	18	+31.2	20
14	40	(United Kingdom) Jonathan Legris	Motaworld Racing	18	+33.5	8
15	39	(United Kingdom) Matt Hamilton	Motaworld Racing	18	+35.5	18
16	16	(United Kingdom) Henry Arundel	Fortec Motorsport	18	+36.9	24
17	22	(United Kingdom) Ross Curnow	Gelles Racing	18	+40.8	23
18	29	(Germany) Jens Höing	GU-Racing Motorsport Team	18	+41.6	25
19	37	(Switzerland) Fabio Leimer	Matson Motorsport	18	+42.1	28
20	20	(United Kingdom) Daniel McKenzie	Fortec Motorsport	18	+42.2	27
21	30	(Germany) Max Wissel	GU-Racing Motorsport Team	18	+43.0	33
22	6	(Germany) Christian Engelhart	ASL Team Mücke Motorsport	18	+43.1	16
23	26	(United States) Ryan Phinny	Gelles Racing	18	+47.9	22
24	25	(Canada) Maxime Pelletier	Gelles Racing	18	+48.8	29
25	18	(United Kingdom) Jack Clarke	Fortec Motorsport	18	+55.2	36
26	35	(United Kingdom) Tom Dunstan	Team Loctite	18	+56.3	35
27	2	(Canada) Philip Major	AIM Autosport	18	+57.9	34
28	17	(Republic of Ireland) Niall Breen	Fortec Motorsport	18	+1:00.4	21
29	31	(United States) Frankie Muniz	Jensen MotorSport	18	+1:02.8	31
30	28	(Romania) Andrei Harnagea	GU-Racing Motorsport Team	15	+3 laps	32
Ret	32	(Spain) Daniel Campos-Hull	Josef Kaufmann Racing	10	+8 laps	14
Ret	27	(Colombia) Sebastián Saavedra	Gelles Racing	5	+13 laps	26
Ret	41	(Germany) Tobias Hegewald	AM-Holzer Rennsport GmbH	3	+15 laps	17
Ret	24	(Canada) Adrien Herberts	Gelles Racing	3	+15 laps	30
Ret	15	(Republic of Ireland) Daniel Murray	Filsell Motorsport	0	+18 laps	15
EX	33	(Czech Republic) Josef Král	Josef Kaufmann Racing	18	+0.7	2
