= Henry Clarke (racing driver) =

American racing driver

Henry Clarke born in 1989, is an American racing driver from Villa Park, California.

Clarke began racing in the USAC National Sprint Car Series in 2008 and won Rookie of the Year honors in 2009, finishing twelfth in overall points. On July 2, 2010, he captured his first National Sprint Car win at Toledo Speedway. On September 24, 2010, he completed a Firestone Indy Lights rookie test for Davey Hamilton Racing at Kentucky Speedway. He signed on with the team to make his series debut at Homestead-Miami Speedway and finished eleventh while his teammate Brandon Wagner captured his first series victory.

== Indy Lights ==
Year	Team	1	2	3	4	5	6	7	8	9	10	11	12	13	Rank	Points
2010	Davey Hamilton Racing	STP	ALA	LBH	INDY	IOW	WGL	TOR	EDM	MOH	SNM	CHI	KTY	HMS; 11	32nd	19
