= Nic LeDuc =

American racing driver

Nic LeDuc (born November 25, 1988) is an American racing driver from Novato, California.

An accomplished karter, LeDuc was the 2007 SCCA Formula Russell champion in 2007, finishing on the podium in every race. He was the runner up the following year and won five of the first 8 races in 2009 before leaving the series. He made a significant step to the Firestone Indy Lights series for its second race of the 2010 season driving for Team PBIR in what so far has been his only start.

== Indy Lights ==
Year	Team	1	2	3	4	5	6	7	8	9	10	11	12	13	Rank	Points
2010	Team PBIR	STP	ALA	LBH; 11	INDY	IOW	WGL	TOR	EDM	MOH	SNM	CHI	KTY	HMS	31st	19
