= Rodrigo Barbosa =

Brazilian racing driver from São Paulo

- Nationality: (Brazil) Brazilian
- Born: September 30, 1988 (age 38) São Paulo, Brazil

Firestone Indy Lights Series
- Years active: 2009-2010
- Teams: ELFF Racing; PDM Racing
- Starts: 27
- Wins: 0
- Poles: 0
- Best finish: 12th in 2010

Previous series
- 2007 2005-2006: SCCA Formula Atlantic; Brazilian Formula Renault 2.0

Rodrigo Barbosa (born September 30, 1988) is a Brazilian racing driver from São Paulo.

After karting, Barbosa began racing in Brazilian Formula Renault 2.0 in 2005 and continued in the series in 2006, finishing nineteenth in points. In 2007, he competed in amateur SCCA Formula Atlantic in the United States and finished ninth at the SCCA Runoff National Championships at Heartland Park Topeka. In 2009, he competed in the Firestone Indy Lights Series for the ELFF Racing team, which returned to the series for the first time since 1993, using a car acquired from Guthrie Meyer Racing. Barbosa struggled to find speed throughout the 2009 season and was constantly in the back of the field, never qualifying ahead of the last row and only managing a best finish of 1tenth, at Chicagoland Speedway where he was still the last place car running at the finish.

At the season's end, Barbosa tested with PDM Racing at Barber Motorsports Park and was able to run four seconds per lap faster with the team than he had with ELFF during the open test at Barber earlier that season. He signed on with PDM to contest the 2010 season. Barbosa completed the season in twelfth place, again last amongst full-time competitors, but did score four top-ten finishes, and managed to not qualify last in a number of oval races.

In 2012, Barbosa scored two podiums in three races in the Brazilian Endurance Championship.

== American open–wheel results ==
(key)

=== Indy Lights ===
Year	Team	1	2	3	4	5	6	7	8	9	10	11	12	13	14	15	Rank	Points	Ref
2009	ELFF Racing	STP; 23	STP; 13	LBH; 25	KAN; 21	INDY; 20	MIL; 12	IOW; DNS	WGL; 17	TOR; 17	EDM; 14	KTY; 13	MOH; 19	SNM; 17	CHI; 10	HMS; 15	15th	190	
2010	PDM Racing	STP; 9	ALA; 16	LBH; 16	INDY; 12	IOW; 10	WGL; 10	TOR; 9	EDM; 12	MOH; 12	SNM; 12	CHI; 10	KTY; 11	HMS; 14			12th	241	
