= 2010 Indy Lights =

2010 Indy Lights season
- Firestone Indy Lights

Season
- Races: 13
- Start date: March 28
- End date: October 2

Awards
- Drivers' champion: (France) Jean-Karl Vernay
- Teams' champion: (United States) Sam Schmidt Motorsports
- Rookie of the Year: (France) Jean-Karl Vernay

The 2010 Indy Racing League Firestone Indy Lights season was the 25th Indy Lights season. It was contested over thirteen races beginning on March 28 on the streets of St. Petersburg, Florida, and ended on October 2 at Homestead-Miami Speedway.

Jean-Karl Vernay became the first European to win the championship title since Alex Lloyd in 2007, after taking five victories and ten top-five placings at the wheel of his Sam Schmidt Motorsports car. His championship title, guaranteed by just starting the final race at Homestead, also garnered him with the Rookie of the Year award, having moved into the series from Europe and the Formula 3 Euro Series. Another driver with ten top-fives, James Hinchcliffe finished second in the title race for Team Moore Racing, a race winner at Long Beach, Edmonton and Chicagoland Speedway.

Third place was fought between AFS Racing/Andretti Autosport team-mates Martin Plowman and Charlie Kimball, with Plowman coming out on top by six points; Plowman won a race at Mid-Ohio, while Kimball finished four races in second place including three in succession early in the season. Other drivers to take wins were Wade Cunningham – winning the Firestone Freedom 100 for the third time – and Sebastián Saavedra at Iowa Speedway, while two drivers visited victory lane for the first time; Pippa Mann at Kentucky Speedway and Brandon Wagner at Homestead in their second seasons in the formula.

== Team and driver chart ==
- All drivers competed in Firestone Firehawk–shod, Dallara chassis.

Team	No.	Drivers	Rounds
(United States) AFS Racing/Andretti Autosport	26	(United States) Charlie Kimball	All
(United States) AFS Racing/Andretti Autosport	27	(United Kingdom) Martin Plowman	All
(United States) Sam Schmidt Motorsports	7	(France) Jean-Karl Vernay	All
(United States) Sam Schmidt Motorsports	11	(United Kingdom) Pippa Mann	1-8, 10-13
(United States) Sam Schmidt Motorsports	49	(Canada) Philip Major	All
(United States) Sam Schmidt Motorsports	77	(United Kingdom) James Winslow	1-3, 6-9
(United States) Sam Schmidt Motorsports	77	(New Zealand) Wade Cunningham	4, 13
(United States) Sam Schmidt Motorsports	77	(Canada) Alex Ellis	10
(United States) Andersen Racing	4	(Spain) Carmen Jordá	1-3, 7-8
(United States) Andersen Racing	4	(Netherlands) Arie Luyendyk Jr.	4
(United States) Andersen Racing	4	(Norway) Anders Krohn	6
(United States) Andersen Racing	4	(Brazil) Giancarlo Vilarinho	9-10
(United States) Andersen Racing	4	(United States) Sean Guthrie	13
(United States) Andersen Racing	5	(United States) Joel Miller	3
(United States) Andersen Racing	5	(Estonia) Tõnis Kasemets	7
(United States) Bryan Herta Autosport	28	(United Kingdom) Stefan Wilson	1-9, 11-12
(United States) Bryan Herta Autosport	28	(United States) Joel Miller	10
(United States) Bryan Herta Autosport	29	(Colombia) Sebastián Saavedra	1-11
(United States) Bryan Herta Autosport	29	(United States) Daniel Herrington	12
(United States) Bryan Herta Autosport	29	(United Kingdom) Dillon Battistini	13
(United States) Team PBIR	35	(United States) Nic LeDuc	2
(United States) Team PBIR	35	(Estonia) Tõnis Kasemets	3
(United States) Team PBIR	35	(United Kingdom) Dillon Battistini	11
(United States) Team PBIR	37	(Republic of Ireland) Niall Quinn	2-3
(United States) Team Moore Racing	2	(Canada) James Hinchcliffe	All
(United States) Team Moore Racing	22	(Spain) Adrián Campos Jr.	All
(United States) Alliance Motorsports	24	(Netherlands) Arie Luyendyk Jr.	11-13
(United States) PDM Racing	18	(Brazil) Rodrigo Barbosa	All
(United States) Walker Racing	40	(United States) Jonathan Summerton	1
(United States) Walker Racing	40	(United Kingdom) Dan Clarke	2-13
(United States) Davey Hamilton Racing	32	(United States) Brandon Wagner	4-5, 11-13
(United States) Davey Hamilton Racing	34	(United States) Henry Clarke	13
(United States) Genoa Racing (United States) O2 Racing Technology	36	(Mexico) David Martínez	9-10
(United States) Genoa Racing (United States) O2 Racing Technology	36	(United States) Daniel Herrington	13
(United States) HVM Racing	6	(Netherlands) Junior Strous	1-3
(United States) Cape Motorsports with Wayne Taylor Racing	10	(Colombia) Gustavo Yacamán	All
(United States) Team E	17	(Belgium) Jan Heylen	1
(United States) Team E	17	(United States) Jeff Simmons	4
(United States) Michael Crawford Motorsports	8	(Mexico) Juan Pablo Garcia	9-10

== Schedule ==
Rnd	Date	Race Name	Track	Location
1	March 28	(United States) Firestone Indy Lights Grand Prix of St. Petersburg	Streets of St. Petersburg	St. Petersburg, FL
2	April 11	(United States) Firestone Indy Lights Grand Prix of Alabama	Barber Motorsports Park	Birmingham, AL
3	April 18	(United States) Firestone Indy Lights Grand Prix of Long Beach	Streets of Long Beach	Long Beach, CA
4	May 28	(United States) Firestone Freedom 100	Indianapolis Motor Speedway	Speedway, IN
5	June 19	(United States) AvoidTheStork.com 100	Iowa Speedway	Newton, IA
6	July 4	(United States) Corning 100	Watkins Glen International	Watkins Glen, NY
7	July 18	(Canada) Toronto 100	Streets of Toronto	Toronto, ON
8	July 25	(Canada) Edmonton 100	Edmonton City Centre Airport	Edmonton, AB
9	August 8	(United States) Mid-Ohio 100	Mid-Ohio Sports Car Course	Lexington, OH
10	August 22	(United States) Carneros 100	Infineon Raceway	Sonoma, CA
11	August 28	(United States) Chicagoland 100	Chicagoland Speedway	Joliet, IL
12	September 4	(United States) Drive Smart Buckle-Up Kentucky 100	Kentucky Speedway	Sparta, KY
13	October 2	(United States) Fuzzy's Ultra Premium Vodka 100	Homestead-Miami Speedway	Homestead, FL

Oval/Speedway
Street/Temporary Circuit
Road Course

== Open Testing ==
=== Firestone Indy Lights Barber Open Test ===
- Friday February 26, 2010
- Barber Motorsports Park, Birmingham, AL
- Testing weather: 52 °F (11 °C), Sunny
- Testing Summary:

Top Three Drivers
Pos	Car No.	Driver	Team	Total Laps	Best Time	Best Speed	In Lap	Practice Session
1	2	(Canada) James Hinchcliffe	(United States) Team Moore Racing	73	1:14.9604	110.458	29	1
2	27	(United Kingdom) Martin Plowman	(United States) AFS Racing/Andretti Autosport	93	1:15.0832	110.278	39	1
3	26	(United States) Charlie Kimball	(United States) AFS Racing/Andretti Autosport	73	1:15.1716	110.148	30	2
Average speed: 108.346 mph (174.366 km/h)

=== Indianapolis Open Test – Indy Lights ===
- Friday May 14, 2010
- Indianapolis Motor Speedway, Speedway, IN
- Testing weather:
- Testing Summary:

Top Three Drivers
Pos	Car No.	Driver	Team	Total Laps	Best Time	Best Speed	In Lap	Practice Session
1	10	(Colombia) Gustavo Yacamán	(United States) Cape Motorsports with Wayne Taylor Racing	105	47.2413	190.511	48	2
2	11	(United Kingdom) Pippa Mann	(United States) Sam Schmidt Motorsports	103	47.3125	190.225	35	2
3	26	(United States) Charlie Kimball	(United States) AFS Racing/Andretti Autosport	36	47.3486	190.080	10	1
Average speed: 0.0 mph (0 km/h)

== Race results ==
Rd.	Race	Pole position	Fastest lap	Most laps led	Winning driver	Winning team
1	(United States) St. Pete	(Canada) James Hinchcliffe	(Colombia) Sebastián Saavedra	(France) Jean-Karl Vernay	(France) Jean-Karl Vernay	Sam Schmidt Motorsports
2	(United States) Barber	(France) Jean-Karl Vernay	(France) Jean-Karl Vernay	(France) Jean-Karl Vernay	(France) Jean-Karl Vernay	Sam Schmidt Motorsports
3	(United States) Long Beach	(Canada) James Hinchcliffe	(Canada) James Hinchcliffe	(Canada) James Hinchcliffe	(Canada) James Hinchcliffe	Team Moore Racing
4	(United States) Indianapolis	(United Kingdom) Pippa Mann	(United States) Jeff Simmons	(New Zealand) Wade Cunningham	(New Zealand) Wade Cunningham	Sam Schmidt Motorsports
5	(United States) Iowa	(Colombia) Sebastián Saavedra	(Canada) Philip Major	(Colombia) Sebastián Saavedra	(Colombia) Sebastián Saavedra	Bryan Herta Autosport
6	(United States) Watkins Glen	(Canada) James Hinchcliffe	(Canada) James Hinchcliffe	(Canada) James Hinchcliffe	(France) Jean-Karl Vernay	Sam Schmidt Motorsports
7	(Canada) Toronto	(France) Jean-Karl Vernay	(United Kingdom) Stefan Wilson	(France) Jean-Karl Vernay	(France) Jean-Karl Vernay	Sam Schmidt Motorsports
8	(Canada) Edmonton	(Canada) James Hinchcliffe	(Canada) James Hinchcliffe	(Canada) James Hinchcliffe	(Canada) James Hinchcliffe	Team Moore Racing
9	(United States) Mid-Ohio	(United Kingdom) Martin Plowman	(Canada) James Hinchcliffe	(United Kingdom) Martin Plowman	(United Kingdom) Martin Plowman	AFS Racing/Andretti Autosport
10	(United States) Sonoma	(France) Jean-Karl Vernay	(France) Jean-Karl Vernay	(France) Jean-Karl Vernay	(France) Jean-Karl Vernay	Sam Schmidt Motorsports
11	(United States) Chicagoland	(United Kingdom) Martin Plowman	(Canada) James Hinchcliffe	(United Kingdom) Pippa Mann	(Canada) James Hinchcliffe	Team Moore Racing
12	(United States) Kentucky	(United Kingdom) Pippa Mann	(Spain) Adrián Campos Jr.	(United Kingdom) Pippa Mann	(United Kingdom) Pippa Mann	Sam Schmidt Motorsports
13	(United States) Homestead	(United Kingdom) Pippa Mann	(Canada) James Hinchcliffe	(United States) Brandon Wagner	(United States) Brandon Wagner	Davey Hamilton Racing

== Race summaries ==
=== Round 1: Streets of St. Petersburg ===
- Sunday March 28, 2010 – 12:58 p.m. EDT
- Streets of St. Petersburg – St. Petersburg, Florida; Temporary street circuit, 1.800 miles (2.897 km)
- Distance: 45 laps / 81.000 miles (130.357 km); reduced to 35 laps / 63.000 miles (101.389 km) due to rain.
- Race weather: 71 °F (22 °C), overcast at start with rain falling later.
- Pole position winner: #2 James Hinchcliffe, 1:06.3496 sec, 97.664 mph (157.175 km/h)
- Most laps led: #7 Jean-Karl Vernay, 31
- Race report: On turn one of the first lap, Philip Major divebombed the field, making contact with polesitter James Hinchcliffe, taking both out of the race. Later that lap, Adrián Campos Jr. who had made contact with Pippa Mann during the start nosed into the wall in turn 8. Mann retired from the race, after spinning under caution. On the lap four restart Jean-Karl Vernay passed Sebastián Saavedra for the lead and was later spun by Charlie Kimball in turn four, bringing out another caution. The race was red flagged on lap six during that caution period due to moisture, allowing the teams to pit and change to full wet tires. The race went back to green on lap nine. On the restart, leader Vernay pulled out to a 9-second lead over Junior Strous who had climbed to second. However, on lap 17 Strous spun in turn 1, handing Vernay a 17-second lead over new second-place Jan Heylen. On lap 25 Saavedra hit the wall bringing out the caution and erasing Vernay's 20 second lead over Heylen. However, on the resultant restart with 8 minutes remaining (the race had become a timed race due to the rain), Vernay was able to pull away and win by 11 seconds over Heylen. Jonathan Summerton spun in the final corner of the last lap and fell from fourth to eighth.

Top Five Finishers
Fin. Pos	St. Pos	Car No.	Driver	Team	Laps	Time	Laps Led
1	2	7	(France) Jean-Karl Vernay	Sam Schmidt Motorsports	35	1:02:02.6848	31
2	4	17	(Belgium) Jan Heylen	Team E	35	+11.2338	0
3	14	28	(United Kingdom) Stefan Wilson	Bryan Herta Autosport	35	+11.5785	0
4	7	26	(United States) Charlie Kimball	AFS Racing/Andretti Autosport	35	+20.4041	0
5	10	10	(Colombia) Gustavo Yacamán	Cape Motorsports with Wayne Taylor Racing	35	+21.8013	0
Race average speed: 60.924 mph (98.048 km/h)
Lead changes: 1 between 2 drivers
Cautions: 4 for 10 laps

=== Round 2: Barber Motorsports Park ===
- Sunday April 11, 2010 – 1:13 p.m. EDT / 12:13 p.m. CDT
- Barber Motorsports Park – Birmingham, Alabama; Permanent road course, 2.300 miles (3.701 km)
- Distance: 40 laps / 92.000 miles (148.060 km)
- Race weather: 76 °F (24 °C), clear skies
- Pole position winner: #7 Jean-Karl Vernay, 1:14.8726 sec, 110.588 mph (177.974 km/h)
- Most laps led: #7 Jean-Karl Vernay, 39
- Race report: At the start, Charlie Kimball moved into the lead ahead of Jean-Karl Vernay but was deemed to have jumped the start. On lap two, Kimball conceded the lead to Vernay and the Sam Schmidt Motorsports driver would not relinquish the lead en route to his second consecutive victory. Kimball finished second ahead of Sebastián Saavedra, Martin Plowman and James Hinchcliffe. Two drivers did not finish the race: Rodrigo Barbosa suffered a mechanical failure, while Carmen Jordá retired after a spin.

Top Five Finishers
Fin. Pos	St. Pos	Car No.	Driver	Team	Laps	Time	Laps Led
1	1	7	(France) Jean-Karl Vernay	Sam Schmidt Motorsports	40	57:07.6033	39
2	2	26	(United States) Charlie Kimball	AFS Racing/Andretti Autosport	40	+1.1542	1
3	4	29	(Colombia) Sebastián Saavedra	Bryan Herta Autosport	40	+5.7970	0
4	3	27	(United Kingdom) Martin Plowman	AFS Racing/Andretti Autosport	40	+9.0794	0
5	5	2	(Canada) James Hinchcliffe	Team Moore Racing	40	+10.2997	0
Race average speed: 96.627 mph (155.506 km/h)
Lead changes: 1 between 2 drivers
Cautions: 2 for 4 laps

=== Round 3: Streets of Long Beach ===
- Sunday April 18, 2010 – 1:40 p.m. EDT / 10:40 a.m. PDT
- Streets of Long Beach – Long Beach, California; Temporary street circuit, 1.968 miles (3.167 km)
- Distance: 45 laps / 88.560 miles (142.524 km)
- Race weather: 64 °F (18 °C), clear skies
- Pole position winner: #2 James Hinchcliffe, 1:14.6261 sec, 94.937 mph (152.786 km/h)
- Most laps led: #2 James Hinchcliffe, 45
- Race report: Starting from his second pole of the season, James Hinchcliffe led the field through Turn 1 on the opening lap as Charlie Kimball overhauled Jean-Karl Vernay for second place. The three drivers then held their respective positions for the duration of the race, as the other drivers battled behind. Sebastián Saavedra and Martin Plowman rounded out the top five placings. Dan Clarke and Junior Strous both ran into early trouble, with Clarke suffering a mechanical problem and Strous running into the barriers on Lap 9. Clarke returned to the race six laps down, and wound up thirteenth at the end of the race. Stefan Wilson suffered an electrical problem, Rodrigo Barbosa was parked after causing two of the race's four full course cautions with spins and Adrián Campos Jr. crashed heavily at Turn 1 on Lap 34, causing the third caution. Almost immediately after the race returned to green after the Campos crash, the yellow flags flew again after Gustavo Yacamán and Niall Quinn were both involved in incidents at the track's Fountain section; Yacamán having been punted from behind by Quinn's team-mate Tõnis Kasemets, while Quinn spun by himself. On the penultimate lap, Sam Schmidt Motorsports' Philip Major ran into his team-mate James Winslow, forcing the British driver into the barrier and was eventually scored in twelfth position.

Top Five Finishers
Fin. Pos	St. Pos	Car No.	Driver	Team	Laps	Time	Laps Led
1	1	2	(Canada) James Hinchcliffe	Team Moore Racing	45	1:03:41.4082	45
2	3	26	(United States) Charlie Kimball	AFS Racing/Andretti Autosport	45	+0.8370	0
3	2	7	(France) Jean-Karl Vernay	Sam Schmidt Motorsports	45	+1.2291	0
4	4	29	(Colombia) Sebastián Saavedra	Bryan Herta Autosport	45	+2.9126	0
5	5	27	(United Kingdom) Martin Plowman	AFS Racing/Andretti Autosport	45	+4.4735	0
Race average speed: 83.429 mph (134.266 km/h)
Lead changes: None
Cautions: 4 for 8 laps

=== Round 4: Firestone Freedom 100 ===
- Friday May 28, 2010 – 12:30 p.m. EDT / 11:30 a.m. CDT
- Indianapolis Motor Speedway – Speedway, Indiana; Permanent racing facility, 2.500 miles (4.023 km)
- Distance: 40 laps / 100.000 miles (160.934 km)
- Race weather: 79 °F (26 °C), clear skies
- Pole position winner: #11 Pippa Mann, 1:35.7505 sec, 187.989 mph (302.539 km/h) (2-lap)
- Most laps led: #77 Wade Cunningham, 38
- Race report: Pippa Mann led the field to the green flag, but was immediately overtaken by Wade Cunningham, with Charlie Kimball, series returnee Jeff Simmons and Martin Plowman all getting ahead of Mann by the end of the first lap. Mann's race ended at Turn 1 of lap three, being an innocent victim in an accident with Simmons, producing the race's only caution period. Championship leader Jean-Karl Vernay hit trouble early in the race, making a lengthy pit-stop on lap one, returning to the field several laps down. When the race returned to green on lap nine, Cunningham led from Kimball, Plowman, Dan Clarke and Philip Major. Kimball took the lead on lap ten before Cunningham repassed him on lap eleven. James Hinchcliffe progressed through the field, and ran as high as second place for the middle portion of the race, before Kimball reasserted himself in the position. He once again took the lead from Cunningham before the New Zealander took the lead for good on lap 34. Cunningham held his rivals off for the remaining laps, as he took his third Freedom 100 victory by 0.4368 seconds from Kimball, with Hinchcliffe, Clarke and Plowman rounding out the top five positions. Along with Simmons and Mann, Arie Luyendyk Jr. retired from the race due to mechanical gremlins. With Vernay finishing down the field, his championship lead over Kimball was trimmed to just five points.

Top Five Finishers
Fin. Pos	St. Pos	Car No.	Driver	Team	Laps	Time	Laps Led
1	2	77	(New Zealand) Wade Cunningham	Sam Schmidt Motorsports	40	39:55.4552	38
2	3	26	(United States) Charlie Kimball	AFS Racing/Andretti Autosport	40	+0.4368	2
3	8	2	(Canada) James Hinchcliffe	Team Moore Racing	40	+2.3638	0
4	10	40	(United Kingdom) Dan Clarke	Walker Racing	40	+2.6459	0
5	4	27	(United Kingdom) Martin Plowman	AFS Racing/Andretti Autosport	40	+3.7024	0
Race average speed: 150.285 mph (241.860 km/h)
Lead changes: 4 between 2 drivers
Cautions: 1 for 6 laps

=== Round 5: AvoidTheStork.com 100 ===
- Saturday June 19, 2010 – 9:40 p.m. EDT / 8:40 p.m. CDT
- Iowa Speedway – Newton, Iowa; Permanent racing facility, 0.894 miles (1.439 km)
- Distance: 115 laps / 102.810 miles (165.457 km)
- Race weather: 77 °F (25 °C), clear skies
- Pole position winner: #29 Sebastián Saavedra, 40.0594 sec, 160.681 mph (258.591 km/h) (2-lap)
- Most laps led: #29 Sebastián Saavedra, 115
- Race report:

Top Five Finishers
Fin. Pos	St. Pos	Car No.	Driver	Team	Laps	Time	Laps Led
1	1	29	(Colombia) Sebastián Saavedra	Bryan Herta Autosport	115	46:10.0471	115
2	2	27	(United Kingdom) Martin Plowman	AFS Racing/Andretti Autosport	115	+0.4820	0
3	3	7	(France) Jean-Karl Vernay	Sam Schmidt Motorsports	115	+1.3682	0
4	5	22	(Spain) Adrián Campos Jr.	Team Moore Racing	115	+5.8468	0
5	9	2	(Canada) James Hinchcliffe	Team Moore Racing	115	+7.4975	0
Race average speed: 133.614 mph (215.031 km/h)
Lead changes: None
Cautions: 2 for 15 laps

=== Round 6: Corning 100 ===
- Sunday July 4, 2010 – 1:30 p.m. EDT
- Watkins Glen International – Watkins Glen, New York; Permanent racing facility, 3.370 miles (5.423 km)
- Distance: 30 laps / 101.100 miles (162.705 km)
- Race weather: 85 °F (29 °C), clear skies
- Pole position winner: #2 James Hinchcliffe, 1:37.3593 sec, 124.610 mph (200.540 km/h)
- Most laps led: #2 James Hinchcliffe, 18
- Race report: Charlie Kimball suffered problems even before the start of the race, stalling his car at Turn 7. His stall forced the start to be waved off a lap. When the race did eventually get under way, James Hinchcliffe led Stefan Wilson into Turn 1. Wilson would be demoted to fourth by the end of the lap, as both championship leader Jean-Karl Vernay and Sebastián Saavedra found a way past the British driver. The first of two cautions flew on lap two as Dan Clarke was tipped into a spin by Pippa Mann and both cars found the wall at Turn 9. After the restart, Wilson was demoted yet further, as debutant Anders Krohn found a way by. Krohn would fall to tenth position by the race's conclusion. Wilson's engine blew at the beginning of lap fourteen, causing the second and final caution due to fluid leaking out of his Bryan Herta Autosport car all the way along the front straight. Vernay found a way past Hinchcliffe on lap nineteen, using the Canadian's slipstream to full effect, passing him into the Inner Loop. Vernay held the lead to the end, as he won his third race of the season to extend his championship lead. Hinchcliffe finished in close proximity to Vernay in second, with Saavedra, Martin Plowman and James Winslow – returning to the series, and starting last out of the 14-car grid – rounded out the top five placings.

Top Five Finishers
Fin. Pos	St. Pos	Car No.	Driver	Team	Laps	Time	Laps Led
1	3	7	(France) Jean-Karl Vernay	Sam Schmidt Motorsports	30	58:48.4946	12
2	1	2	(Canada) James Hinchcliffe	Team Moore Racing	30	+0.2135	18
3	4	29	(Colombia) Sebastián Saavedra	Bryan Herta Autosport	30	+3.9635	0
4	6	27	(United Kingdom) Martin Plowman	AFS Racing/Andretti Autosport	30	+19.0729	0
5	14	77	(United Kingdom) James Winslow	Sam Schmidt Motorsports	30	+23.3294	0
Race average speed: 103.149 mph (166.002 km/h)
Lead changes: 1 between 2 drivers
Cautions: 2 for 6 laps

=== Round 7: Toronto 100 ===
- Sunday July 18, 2010 – 10:25 a.m. EDT
- Streets of Toronto – Toronto, Ontario; Temporary street circuit, 1.755 miles (2.824 km)
- Distance: 50 laps / 87.750 miles (141.220 km)
- Race weather: 72 °F (22 °C), clear skies
- Pole position winner: #7 Jean-Karl Vernay, 1:05.2989 sec, 96.755 mph (155.712 km/h)
- Most laps led: #7 Jean-Karl Vernay, 50
- Race report: Jean-Karl Vernay dominated en route to his fourth victory of the season, leading every lap of the race from pole position. After fending off sufficient pressure from James Hinchcliffe, Vernay extended his lead despite two full course cautions for incidents at Turn 8. Hinchcliffe was due to finish second behind Vernay but made a mistake into Turn 3 and allowed Dan Clarke and Gustavo Yacamán to fill the remaining podium slots. Charlie Kimball also looked for the pass into Turn 5, but ended up colliding with Hinchcliffe sending him into the wall and a tenth-place classification. Kimball finished fourth ahead of a recovering Stefan Wilson, who set the fastest lap after earlier going down the escape road due to an error. Other retirees from the race were Sebastián Saavedra who lost fourth gear, and Carmen Jordá who spun at Turn 8.

Top Five Finishers
Fin. Pos	St. Pos	Car No.	Driver	Team	Laps	Time	Laps Led
1	1	7	(France) Jean-Karl Vernay	Sam Schmidt Motorsports	50	58:52.0083	50
2	3	40	(United Kingdom) Dan Clarke	Walker Racing	50	+1.7469	0
3	4	10	(Colombia) Gustavo Yacamán	Cape Motorsports with Wayne Taylor Racing	50	+2.7446	0
4	7	26	(United States) Charlie Kimball	AFS Racing/Andretti Autosport	50	+3.5688	0
5	10	28	(United Kingdom) Stefan Wilson	Bryan Herta Autosport	50	+4.2667	0
Race average speed: 89.439 mph (143.938 km/h)
Lead changes: None
Cautions: 2 for 4 laps

=== Round 8: Edmonton 100 ===
- Sunday July 25, 2010 – 2:57 p.m. EDT / 12:57 p.m. MDT
- Edmonton City Centre Airport – Edmonton, Alberta; Temporary airport course, 1.973 miles (3.175 km)
- Distance: 50 laps / 98.650 miles (158.762 km)
- Race weather: 69 °F (21 °C), clear skies
- Pole position winner: #2 James Hinchcliffe, 1:06.2160 sec, 107.267 mph (172.630 km/h)
- Most laps led: #2 James Hinchcliffe, 50
- Race report: James Hinchcliffe led from start to finish, as he cut Jean-Karl Vernay's championship lead by thirteen to 55, in a race which lacked overtaking moves. The top five qualifiers – Hinchcliffe, Vernay, Martin Plowman, Charlie Kimball and Dan Clarke – claimed the top five placings, with only Carmen Jordá failing to finish out of the 13-car grid.

Top Five Finishers
Fin. Pos	St. Pos	Car No.	Driver	Team	Laps	Time	Laps Led
1	1	2	(Canada) James Hinchcliffe	Team Moore Racing	50	58:33.2721	50
2	2	7	(France) Jean-Karl Vernay	Sam Schmidt Motorsports	50	+1.2273	0
3	3	27	(United Kingdom) Martin Plowman	AFS Racing/Andretti Autosport	50	+9.5605	0
4	4	26	(United States) Charlie Kimball	AFS Racing/Andretti Autosport	50	+11.6991	0
5	5	40	(United Kingdom) Dan Clarke	Walker Racing	50	+12.5320	0
Race average speed: 101.085 mph (162.681 km/h)
Lead changes: None
Cautions: 1 for 3 laps

=== Round 9: Mid-Ohio 100 ===
- Sunday August 8, 2010 – 12:30 p.m. EDT
- Mid-Ohio Sports Car Course – Lexington, Ohio; Permanent racing facility, 2.258 miles (3.634 km)
- Distance: 40 laps / 90.320 miles (145.356 km)
- Race weather: 83 °F (28 °C), clear skies
- Pole position winner: #27 Martin Plowman, 1:12.8624 sec, 111.564 mph (179.545 km/h)
- Most laps led: #27 Martin Plowman, 40
- Race report: Martin Plowman became an Indy Lights victor after leading from start-to-finish to tie James Hinchcliffe for second in the championship. Plowman held off the challenge of Hinchcliffe during the race, with the Canadian driver running wide midway through the race. British drivers claimed a 1-2 as Dan Clarke finished second ahead of Plowman's team-mate Charlie Kimball and the Bryan Herta Autosport cars of Stefan Wilson and Sebastián Saavedra. Championship leader Jean-Karl Vernay struggled all weekend and finished in eighth, just behind Hinchcliffe.

Top Five Finishers
Fin. Pos	St. Pos	Car No.	Driver	Team	Laps	Time	Laps Led
1	1	27	(United Kingdom) Martin Plowman	AFS Racing/Andretti Autosport	40	50:28.5067	40
2	3	40	(United Kingdom) Dan Clarke	Walker Racing	40	+0.8443	0
3	6	26	(United States) Charlie Kimball	AFS Racing/Andretti Autosport	40	+4.1734	0
4	5	28	(United Kingdom) Stefan Wilson	Bryan Herta Autosport	40	+7.6215	0
5	4	29	(Colombia) Sebastián Saavedra	Bryan Herta Autosport	40	+7.8045	0
Race average speed: 107.364 mph (172.786 km/h)
Lead changes: None
Cautions: None

=== Round 10: Carneros 100 ===
- Sunday August 22, 2010 – 2:45 p.m. EDT / 11:45 a.m. PDT
- Infineon Raceway – Sonoma, California; Permanent racing facility, 2.303 miles (3.706 km)
- Distance: 40 laps / 92.120 miles (148.253 km)
- Race weather: 67 °F (19 °C), clear skies
- Pole position winner: #7 Jean-Karl Vernay, 1:23.5582 sec, 99.222 mph (159.682 km/h)
- Most laps led: #7 Jean-Karl Vernay, 40
- Race report:

Top Five Finishers
Fin. Pos	St. Pos	Car No.	Driver	Team	Laps	Time	Laps Led
1	1	7	(France) Jean-Karl Vernay	Sam Schmidt Motorsports	40	1:02:21.4252	40
2	2	26	(United States) Charlie Kimball	AFS Racing/Andretti Autosport	40	+3.4245	0
3	3	2	(Canada) James Hinchcliffe	Team Moore Racing	40	+10.5583	0
4	4	10	(Colombia) Gustavo Yacamán	Cape Motorsports with Wayne Taylor Racing	40	+15.2115	0
5	7	11	(United Kingdom) Pippa Mann	Sam Schmidt Motorsports	40	+23.2599	0
Race average speed: 88.638 mph (142.649 km/h)
Lead changes: None
Cautions: 2 for 5 laps

=== Round 11: Chicagoland 100 ===
- Saturday August 28, 2010 – 5:15 p.m. EDT / 4:15 p.m. CDT
- Chicagoland Speedway – Joliet, Illinois; Permanent racing facility, 1.520 miles (2.446 km)
- Distance: 67 laps / 101.840 miles (163.896 km)
- Race weather: 93 °F (34 °C), clear skies
- Pole position winner: #27 Martin Plowman, 57.7510 sec, 189.503 mph (304.976 km/h) (2-lap)
- Most laps led: #11 Pippa Mann, 35
- Race report:

Top Five Finishers
Fin. Pos	St. Pos	Car No.	Driver	Team	Laps	Time	Laps Led
1	13	2	(Canada) James Hinchcliffe	Team Moore Racing	67	42:30.9080	3
2	2	11	(United Kingdom) Pippa Mann	Sam Schmidt Motorsports	67	+0.0159	35
3	4	49	(Canada) Philip Major	Sam Schmidt Motorsports	67	+0.0557	0
4	5	7	(France) Jean-Karl Vernay	Sam Schmidt Motorsports	67	+0.1271	0
5	11	40	(United Kingdom) Dan Clarke	Walker Racing	67	+0.2061	0
Race average speed: 143.723 mph (231.300 km/h)
Lead changes: 4 between 3 drivers
Cautions: 4 for 17 laps

=== Round 12: Drive Smart Buckle-Up Kentucky 100 ===
- Saturday September 4, 2010 – 5:30 p.m. EDT
- Kentucky Speedway – Sparta, Kentucky; Permanent racing facility, 1.480 miles (2.382 km)
- Distance: 67 laps / 99.160 miles (159.583 km)
- Race weather: 76 °F (24 °C), scattered clouds
- Pole position winner: #11 Pippa Mann, 55.9447 sec, 190.474 mph (306.538 km/h) (2-lap)
- Most laps led: #11 Pippa Mann, 67
- Race report: Pippa Mann led from start to finish to join Ana Beatriz as female winners in Indy Lights, as she pulled away from her rivals to a winning margin of nearly seven seconds. Jean-Karl Vernay had a chance to wrap up the title with a round to spare, but with James Hinchcliffe finishing ahead of him, his 48-point championship lead meant that Vernay will only need to start the final race on October 2 to become champion. Adrián Campos Jr. equalled his best finish to place fourth, a car length behind Vernay while Gustavo Yacamán finished fifth after starting on the back row. Daniel Herrington returned to the series as a raceday replacement at Bryan Herta Autosport for Sebastián Saavedra who parted company with the team but only made it as far as lap two, when he was involved in a three-car crash with team-mate Stefan Wilson and Philip Major, which brought out the only caution of the race, before the race was halted for 15 minutes to sweep the circuit of debris. All three drivers were unhurt in the incident.

Top Five Finishers
Fin. Pos	St. Pos	Car No.	Driver	Team	Laps	Time	Laps Led
1	1	11	(United Kingdom) Pippa Mann	Sam Schmidt Motorsports	67	34:04.7529	67
2	6	2	(Canada) James Hinchcliffe	Team Moore Racing	67	+6.8372	0
3	4	7	(France) Jean-Karl Vernay	Sam Schmidt Motorsports	67	+9.7137	0
4	7	22	(Spain) Adrián Campos Jr.	Team Moore Racing	67	+9.7924	0
5	13	10	(Colombia) Gustavo Yacamán	Cape Motorsports with Wayne Taylor Racing	67	+13.9245	0
Race average speed: 174.581 mph (280.961 km/h)
Lead changes: None
Cautions: 1 for 3 laps

=== Round 13: Fuzzy's Ultra Premium Vodka 100 ===
- Saturday October 2, 2010 – 3:45 p.m. EDT
- Homestead-Miami Speedway – Homestead, Florida; Permanent racing facility, 1.485 miles (2.390 km)
- Distance: 67 laps / 99.495 miles (160.122 km)
- Race weather: 88 °F (31 °C), clear skies
- Pole position winner: #11 Pippa Mann, 57.2999 sec, 186.597 mph (300.299 km/h) (2-lap)
- Most laps led: #32 Brandon Wagner, 66
- Race report:

Top Five Finishers
Fin. Pos	St. Pos	Car No.	Driver	Team	Laps	Time	Laps Led
1	3	32	(United States) Brandon Wagner	Davey Hamilton Racing	67	40:38.3036	66
2	6	2	(Canada) James Hinchcliffe	Team Moore Racing	67	+0.7006	1
3	5	77	(New Zealand) Wade Cunningham	Sam Schmidt Motorsports	67	+9.0836	0
4	10	22	(Spain) Adrián Campos Jr.	Team Moore Racing	67	+10.1335	0
5	1	11	(United Kingdom) Pippa Mann	Sam Schmidt Motorsports	67	+10.9261	0
Race average speed: 146.898 mph (236.409 km/h)
Lead changes: 2 between 2 drivers
Cautions: 1 for 9 laps

== Driver standings ==
Pos	Driver	STP (United States)	BAR (United States)	LBH (United States)	INDY (United States)	IOW (United States)	WGL (United States)	TOR (Canada)	EDM (Canada)	MOH (United States)	SNM (United States)	CHI (United States)	KTY (United States)	HMS (United States)	Pts
1	(France) Jean-Karl Vernay RY	1*	**1***	3	13	3	1	**1***	2	8	**1***	4	3	15	494
2	(Canada) James Hinchcliffe	**15**	5	**1***	3	5	**2***	10	**1***	7	3	1	2	2	471
3	(United Kingdom) Martin Plowman	6	4	5	5	2	4	7	3	**1***	16	**13**	7	6	392
4	(United States) Charlie Kimball	4	2	2	2	13	11	4	4	3	2	14	6	13	388
5	(United Kingdom) Pippa Mann	13	12	8	**16**	8	14	8	11		5	2*	**1***	**5**	313
6	(Spain) Adrián Campos Jr. R	16	13	15	10	4	7	13	8	6	7	8	4	4	307
7	(United Kingdom) Dan Clarke R		7	13	4	9	13	2	5	2	13	5	10	17	304
8	(Colombia) Sebastián Saavedra	12	3	4	9	**1***	3	14	6	5	15	11			303
9	(Canada) Philip Major R	14	10	7	6	6	6	12	10	10	11	3	13	8	299
10	(Colombia) Gustavo Yacamán	5	9	14	11	11	8	3	9	15	4	15	5	16	293
11	(United Kingdom) Stefan Wilson R	3	6	17	7	7	12	5	7	4		6	14		278
12	(Brazil) Rodrigo Barbosa	9	16	16	12	10	9	9	12	12	12	10	11	14	241
13	(United States) Brandon Wagner				8	12						12	8	1*	136
14	(United Kingdom) James Winslow R	7	15	12			5	11		9					130
15	(New Zealand) Wade Cunningham				1*									3	87
16	(Spain) Carmen Jordá R	11	17	10	Wth			15	13						84
17	(Netherlands) Arie Luyendyk Jr.				14							7	9	12	82
18	(Estonia) Tõnis Kasemets R			6				6							56
19	(Netherlands) Junior Strous	10	8	18											56
20	(Mexico) Juan Pablo Garcia									11	6				47
21	(United States) Daniel Herrington												12	7	44
22	(United Kingdom) Dillon Battistini											9		9	44
23	(United States) Joel Miller R			11							9				41
24	(Belgium) Jan Heylen R	2													40
25	(Mexico) David Martínez									14	8				40
26	(Republic of Ireland) Niall Quinn R		14	9											38
27	(Brazil) Giancarlo Vilarinho R									13	10				37
28	(United States) Jonathan Summerton	8													24
29	(Norway) Anders Krohn R						10								20
30	(United States) Sean Guthrie													10	20
31	(United States) Nic LeDuc R		11												19
32	(United States) Henry Clarke R													11	19
33	(Canada) Alex Ellis R										14				16
34	(United States) Jeff Simmons				15										15
Pos	Driver	STP (United States)	BAR (United States)	LBH (United States)	INDY (United States)	IOW (United States)	WGL (United States)	TOR (Canada)	EDM (Canada)	MOH (United States)	SNM (United States)	CHI (United States)	KTY (United States)	HMS (United States)	Pts

Color	Result
Gold	Winner
Silver	2nd place
Bronze	3rd place
Green	4th & 5th place
Light Blue	6th–10th place
Dark Blue	Finished (Outside Top 10)
Purple	Did not finish
Red	Did not qualify (DNQ)
Brown	Withdrawn (Wth)
Black	Disqualified (DSQ)
White	Did not start (DNS)
Blank	Did not participate (DNP)
Blank	Not competing

**In-line notation**
**Bold**	Pole position (1 point)
Italics	Ran fastest race lap
*	Led most race laps (2 points)
^{1}	Qualifying cancelled no bonus point awarded
Rookie of the Year
Rookie

Position	1	2	3	4	5	6	7	8	9	10	11	12	13	14	15	16	17	18	19	20	21	22	23	24	25	26	27	28	29	30	31	32	33
Points	50	40	35	32	30	28	26	24	22	20	19	18	17	16	15	14	13	12	11	10	9	8	7	6	5	4	3	3	3	3	3	3	3

- Ties in points broken by number of wins, or best finishes.
