= Niall Quinn (racing driver) =

Irish racing driver

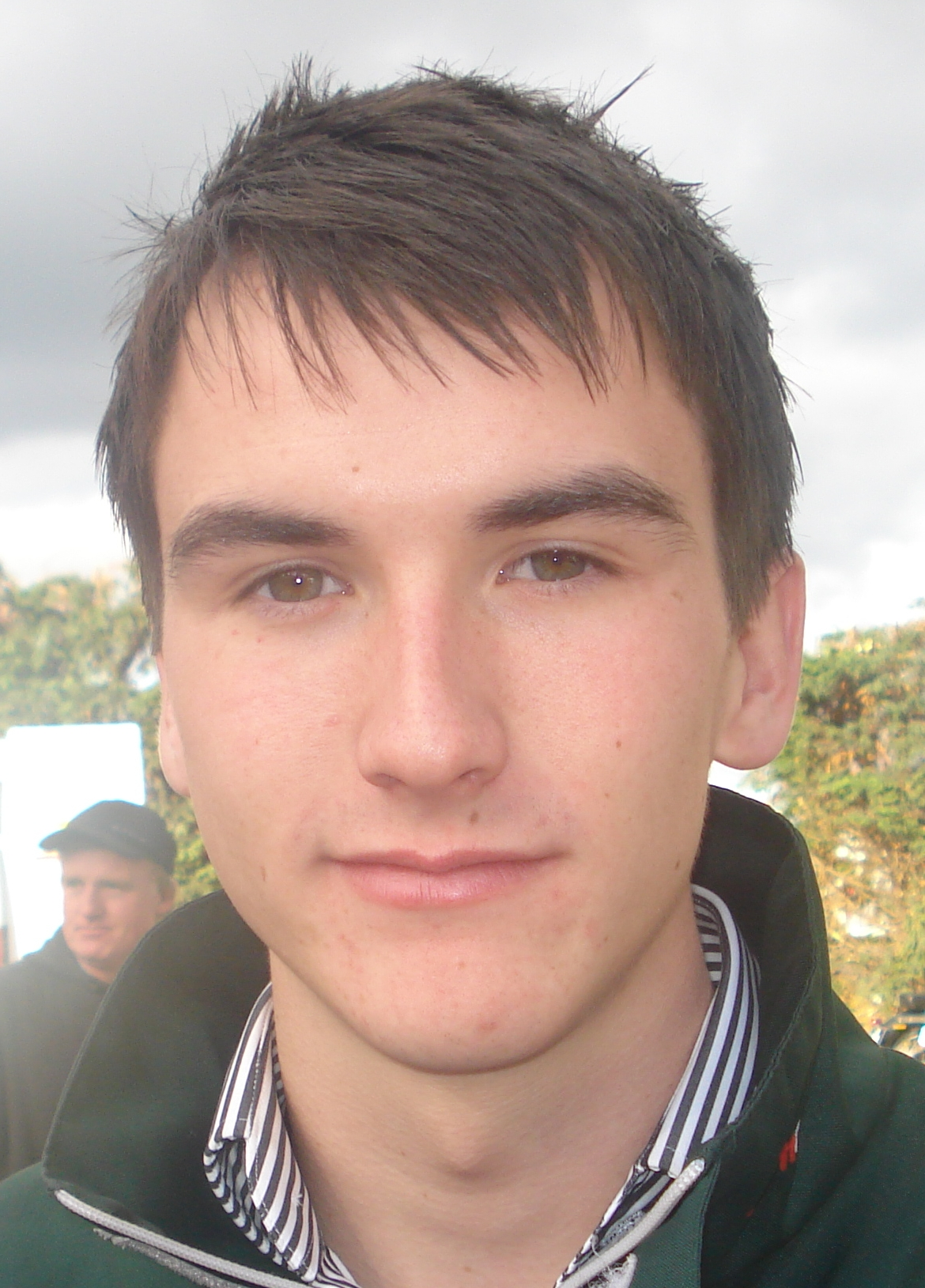
- Niall Quinn
- Nationality: Irish
- Born: 22 August 1988 (age 38) Dunboyne, Ireland

Previous series
- 2010 2008 2007 2006: Firestone Indy Lights; British Formula 3 Championship; Formula BMW ADAC; Formula BMW UK

Championship titles
- 2008: Formula Palmer Audi Autumn Trophy Champion

Awards
- 2007: Motorsport Ireland Young Racing Driver of the Year

Niall Quinn (born 22 August 1988 in Dunboyne) is an Irish motor racing driver who currently lives in County Meath, Ireland.

== Early career ==
1999- third place in Irish Karting Championship in Cadet
2000- first place in Irish Karting Championship in Cadet
2002- third place in Irish Karting Championship in Junior Intercontinental "A" (JICA)
2003- first place in Irish Karting Championship in Junior Intercontinental "A" (JICA)
2004- fifth place in Irish Karting Championship in Formula A
2005- first place in Irish Karting Championship in Formula A

Quinn is the only driver in Irish karting history to win Cadet, JICA, and Formula "A", the three premier categories in Irish Karting. Quinn was also a junior kart champion, awarded the title in late 2003.

At the end of 2005, Quinn won a worldwide driver shoot-out to win a contract to drive in the Red Bull Junior team.

== 2006 ==
In 2006, Quinn raced in the Formula BMW UK Championship as a Red Bull Junior driver. With Carlin Motorsport, he was the early leader in the Rookie Cup Championship for first-time car racers. Quinn finished third in the Rookie Cup Standings, and an eleventh position and fifth place in the Formula BMW World Finals (the end of year world championship) with Holzer RennSport was a highlight of the year.

After being dropped by Red Bull, Quinn came third in the 2006 Motorsport Ireland Young Racing Driver of the Year awards.

== 2007 ==
In 2007, Quinn raced in the Formula BMW Germany Series with Holzer RennSport. He finished seventh in the standings and scored two podium finishes.

Quinn was named Motorsport Ireland Young Racing Driver of the Year in November 2007. As part of this award, he won the chance to drive for A1GP Team Ireland in the Australian race at Eastern Creek, Sydney in February 2008.

== 2008–2010 ==
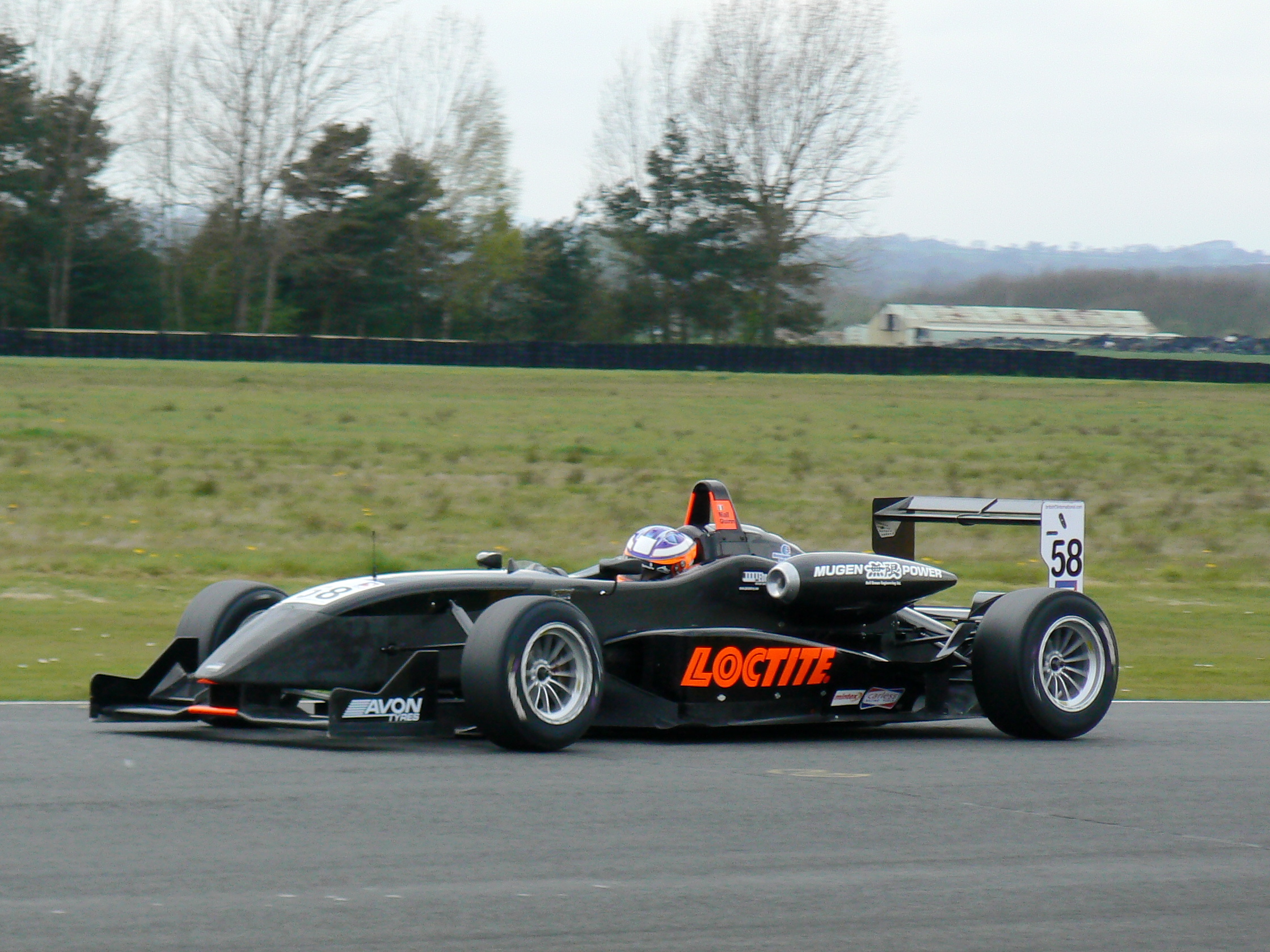
Quinn driving for Team Loctite at the Croft round of the 2008 British Formula 3 season.

In January 2008, Quinn competed in four rounds of the Asian Formula Three series in Batangas, Philippines with Aran Racing, scoring two second-place finishes on his Formula Three debut.

Quinn drove as Rookie driver for Team Ireland in A1GP World Cup of Motorsport, season 3, for the Australian, South African, Mexican, Chinese, and Great British rounds of the series. He was signed again signed up for season 4 as rookie driver.

Quinn competed in early rounds of the British Formula 3 series in the National class with Team Loctite in a Dallara Mugen-Honda. Later in the season, he raced in the German F3 championship for one round at Oschersleben with Van Amersfoort Racing in a Dallara Volkswagen.

Quinn won the Formula Palmer Audi Autumn Trophy, with two wins and four podiums.

Despite the success in 2008, Quinn did not race full-time in 2009, only testing for A1 Team Ireland and appearing in a few exhibition events such as the Goodwood Festival of Speed and the Dublin Grand Prix.

Quinn signed with Team PBIR to race in the Firestone Indy Lights series beginning with the inaugural race at Barber Motorsports Park in April 2010.

== Racing results ==
=== American open-wheel racing results ===
(key)

==== Indy Lights ====
Year	Team	1	2	3	4	5	6	7	8	9	10	11	12	13	Rank	Points	Ref
2010	Team PBIR	STP	ALA; 14	LBH; 9	INDY	IOW	WGL	TOR	EDM	MOH	SNM	CHI	KTY	HMS	26th	38	
