= Mika Mäki =

Finnish former racing driver (born 1988)

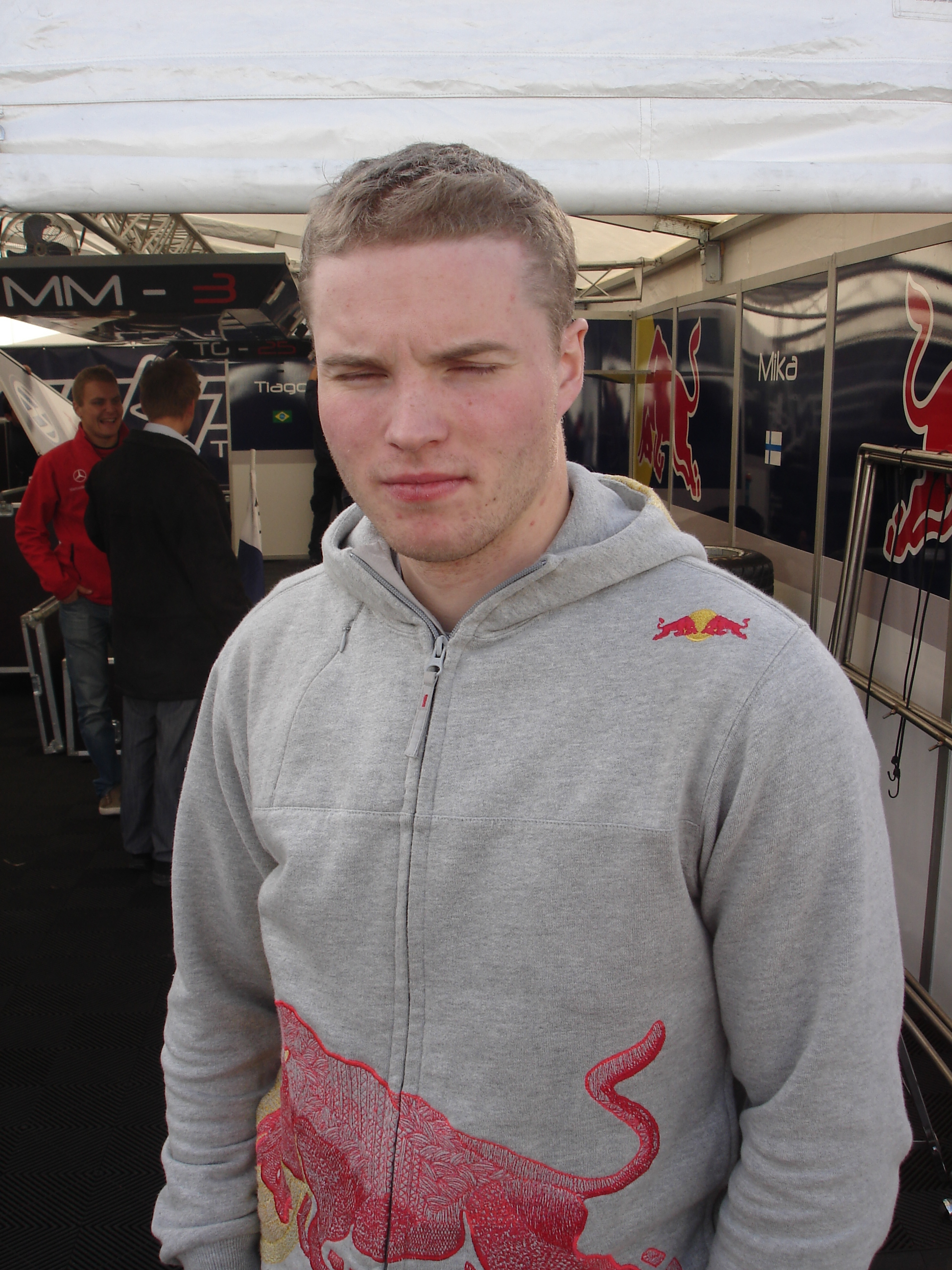
- Nationality: (Finland) Finnish
- Born: 27 February 1988 (age 38) Pirkkala, Finland

Previous series
- 2008-10 2008–09 2007 2007 2005–06: Formula 3 Euro Series; GP2 Asia Series; Formula Renault 2.0 Eurocup; Formula Renault 2.0 Italia; Formula BMW ADAC

Championship titles
- 2007: Formula Renault 2.0 Italia

Mika Mäki (born February 27, 1988) is a Finnish former racing driver.

== Career ==
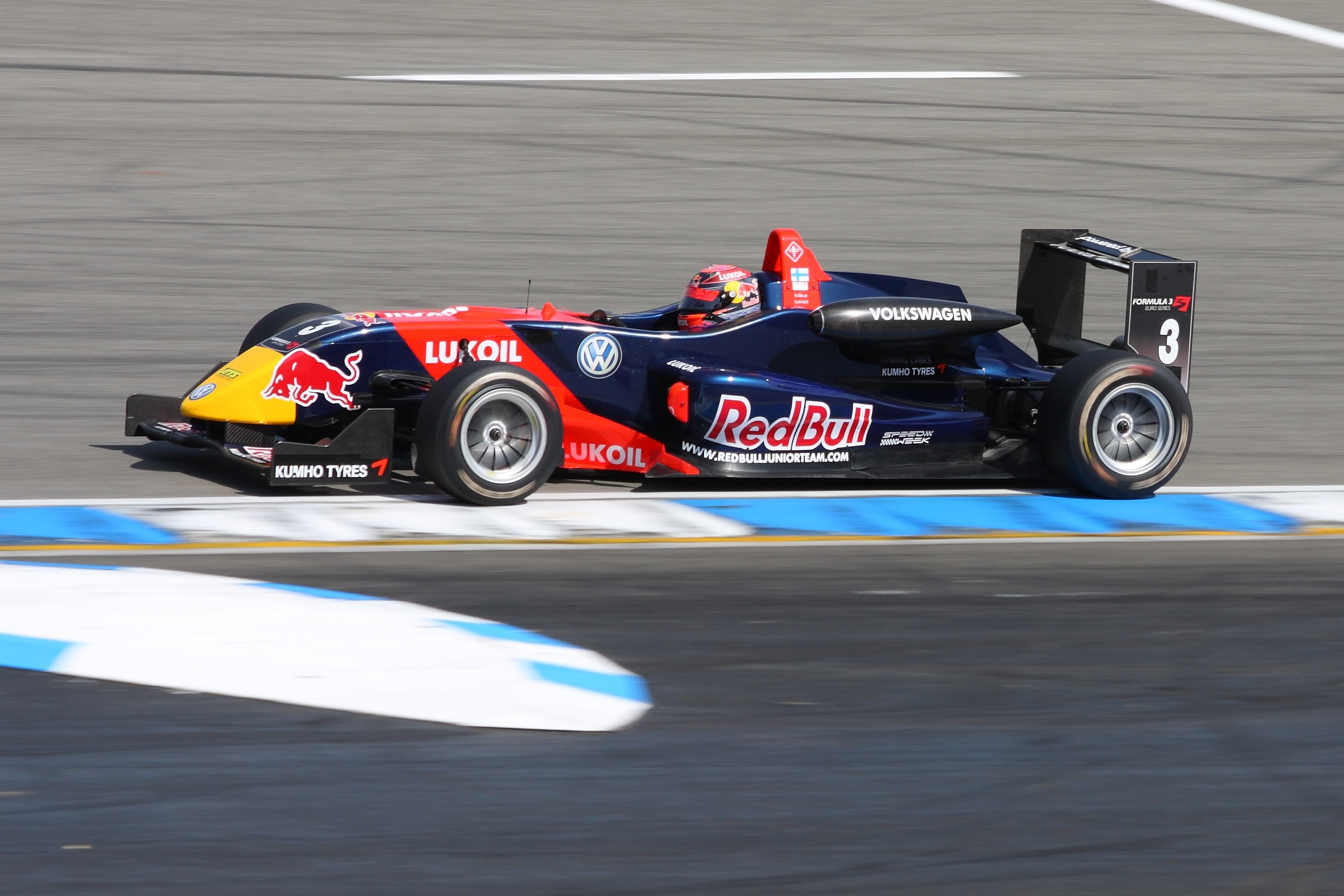
Mäki during the opening round of the 2009 Formula Three Euroseries season at Hockenheim.

Mäki started in karting, and competed for five years before heading to Germany and its Formula BMW ADAC series in 2005, finishing fourth in the Rookie Cup, and took his first victory at the Norisring. He moved to the Eifelland Racing Team for the 2006 season, finishing as runner-up with nine podiums.

In 2007, Mäki got a seat in the Red Bull Junior Team. He was one of eighteen drivers selected for the programme of developing young talented drivers towards Formula One. During the season, he won five rounds and gained the title of Italian Formula Renault Champion.

For the 2008 season, Mäki signed with Mücke Motorsport to compete in the F3 Euroseries. He opened the season with a victory in Hockenheimring. He finished the season fifth in the results with two wins and five podiums.

On June 15, 2008, Mäki had a serious accident at the city of Tampere, driving a Nissan 350Z. He lost control of the car at the entrance of a tunnel, where the speed limit is 40 km/h (25 mph), According to local press a number of pedestrians were also thought to have been caught up in the incident and suffered bruising due to flying debris. Reports quoted local police as suggesting that Mäki may have been involved in a street race.

Mäki also made his GP2 Series début in 2008 by competing in the first round of the 2008–09 GP2 Asia Series season for the Arden team. However, he was then replaced by Renger van der Zande.

Mäki returned to the F3 Euroseries for the 2009 season, having signed a deal with the Signature-Plus team. Mäki finished on the podium four times, including a win at Brands Hatch, and finished sixth in the championship.

== Racing record ==
=== Career summary ===
Season	Series	Team name	Races	Wins	Poles	F.L.	Podiums	Points	Position
2005	Formula BMW ADAC	KDF Motorsport	20	1	0	0	2	44	12th
2006	Formula BMW ADAC	Eifelland Racing	18	2	4	4	9	182	**2nd**
2006	Formula Renault 2.0 NEC	Koiranen Bros. Motorsport	2	0	0	0	0	12	32nd
2006	Formula BMW World Final	Eifelland Racing	1	0	0	0	1	N/A	**2nd**
2007	Formula Renault 2.0 Eurocup	Epsilon Red Bull Team	14	0	0	0	3	46	9th
2007	Formula Renault 2.0 Italy	Epsilon Red Bull Team	14	5	2	3	7	274	**1st**
2008	Formula 3 Euro Series	Mücke Motorsport	20	2	0	2	5	46	5th
2008	Macau Grand Prix	Signature-Plus	1	0	0	0	0	N/A	4th
2008	Masters of Formula 3	Mücke Motorsport	1	0	0	0	0	N/A	4th
2008–09	GP2 Asia Series	Trust Team Arden	2	0	0	0	0	0	29th
2009	Formula 3 Euro Series	Signature-Plus	20	1	0	1	4	43	6th
2009	Macau Grand Prix	Hitech Racing	1	0	0	0	0	N/A	8th
2009	Masters of Formula 3	Signature-Plus	1	0	0	0	1	N/A	**2nd**
2010	Formula 3 Euro Series	Motopark Academy	6	0	0	0	0	0	17th

=== Complete Formula Renault 2.0 NEC results ===
(key) (Races in bold indicate pole position) (Races in italics indicate fastest lap)

Year	Entrant	1	2	3	4	5	6	7	8	9	10	11	12	13	14	15	16	DC	Points
2006	Koiranen Bros. Motorsport	OSC; 1	OSC; 2	SPA; 1	SPA; 2	NÜR; 1	NÜR; 2	ZAN; 1	ZAN; 2	OSC; 1	OSC; 2	ASS; 1	ASS; 2	AND; 1 Ret	AND; 2; 11	SAL; 1	SAL; 2	33rd	12

=== Complete Eurocup Formula Renault 2.0 results ===
(key) (Races in bold indicate pole position; races in italics indicate fastest lap)

Year	Entrant	1	2	3	4	5	6	7	8	9	10	11	12	13	14	DC	Points
2007	Epsilon Red Bull Team	ZOL; 1 Ret	ZOL; 2; 13	NÜR; 1; 3	NÜR; 2; 2	HUN; 1; 10	HUN; 2 Ret	DON; 1; 13	DON; 2; 5	MAG; 1; 15	MAG; 2; 20	EST; 1; 6	EST; 2; 2	CAT; 1; 32	CAT; 2; 6	9th	46

Sporting positions
Preceded by Dani Clos	Italian Formula Renault 2.0 winner 2007	Succeeded by Pål Varhaug
