= 2006 Formula BMW UK season =

Seasons
- ← 2005 2007 →

The 2006 Formula BMW UK season was the third Formula BMW season based in United Kingdom whose mission was to develop talented young drivers and introduce them to auto racing using full-size cars. The series was part of the support race package for the BTCC.

== Teams and drivers ==
All cars were Mygale FB02 chassis powered by BMW engines. Guest drivers in italics.

Team	No	Driver	Class	Rounds
(United Kingdom) Fortec Motorsport	1	(Republic of Ireland) Niall Breen		All
(United Kingdom) Fortec Motorsport	2	(United Kingdom) Euan Hankey		All
(United Kingdom) Fortec Motorsport	3	(United Kingdom) Henry Arundel	R	All
(United Kingdom) Team Loctite Yamaha	4	(United Kingdom) Oliver Turvey		4-10
(United Kingdom) Carlin Motorsport	5	(Republic of Ireland) Niall Quinn	R	All
(United Kingdom) Carlin Motorsport	6	(United Kingdom) Oliver Oakes		1-9
(United Kingdom) Carlin Motorsport	6	(Austria) Philipp Eng		10
(United Kingdom) Master Motorsport	7	(United Kingdom) Michael Meadows		All
(United Kingdom) Rowan Motorsport	8	(Japan) Kimiya Sato	R	All
(United Kingdom) Nexa Racing	9	(United Kingdom) Ross Curnow		All
(United Kingdom) Nexa Racing	10	(United Kingdom) Tom Dunston	R	All
(United Kingdom) Nexa Racing	11	(United Kingdom) Jack Clarke	R	All
(United Kingdom) Mackie Motorsport	13	(United Kingdom) Chris Holmes		All
(Republic of Ireland) Filsell Motorsport	14	(United Kingdom) Matt Howson		3-4, 7
(Republic of Ireland) Filsell Motorsport	15	(Republic of Ireland) Daniel Murray	R	All
(Republic of Ireland) Filsell Motorsport	16	(United Kingdom) Roger Orgee	R	1-7
(United Kingdom) Coles Racing	16	(United Kingdom) Roger Orgee	R	8-10
(United Kingdom) Coles Racing	18	(United Kingdom) Paul Rees		1-2
(United Kingdom) Coles Racing	18	(United Kingdom) Richard Singleton		3, 7, 9
(United Kingdom) Coles Racing	42	(United Kingdom) Joe Osborne		1-2, 4-5
(United Kingdom) Coles Racing	98	(United Kingdom) Matthew Hamilton	R	All
(United Kingdom) Promatecme-RPM	20	(United Kingdom) Daniel McKenzie		All
(United Kingdom) Promatecme-RPM	40	(United Kingdom) Marcus Weller		1-6, 8-10
(United Kingdom) Motaworld Racing	26	(Australia) Daniel Ricciardo		8
(United Kingdom) Motaworld Racing	27	(Australia) Charlie Noble-Mundin		1-6
(United Kingdom) Motaworld Racing	28	(United Kingdom) Jonathan Legris		3, 5-10
(United Kingdom) Motaworld Racing	29	(Australia) Michael Patrizi		All
(United Kingdom) Team SWR (United Kingdom) Mansell Motorsport	44	(United Kingdom) Leo Mansell	R	All
(United Kingdom) Team SWR (United Kingdom) Mansell Motorsport	50	(United Kingdom) Greg Mansell	R	All

Icon	Class
R	Rookie Cup

== 2006 Race calendar and winners ==
=== Races ===
Round	Circuit	Date	Pole position	Fastest lap	Winning driver	Winning team
1	Brands Hatch Indy	April 9	(United Kingdom) Oliver Oakes	(United Kingdom) Euan Hankey	(United Kingdom) Oliver Oakes	(United Kingdom) Carlin Motorsport
2	Brands Hatch Indy	April 9	(United Kingdom) Euan Hankey	(United Kingdom) Euan Hankey	(United Kingdom) Euan Hankey	(United Kingdom) Fortec Motorsports
3	Mondello Park	April 23	(Republic of Ireland) Niall Breen	(United Kingdom) Ross Curnow	(Republic of Ireland) Niall Breen	(United Kingdom) Fortec Motorsports
4	Mondello Park	April 23	(United Kingdom) Oliver Oakes	(United Kingdom) Michael Meadows	(Republic of Ireland) Niall Breen	(United Kingdom) Fortec Motorsports
5	Oulton Park	May 13	(United Kingdom) Jonathan Legris	(United Kingdom) Euan Hankey	(United Kingdom) Euan Hankey	(United Kingdom) Fortec Motorsports
6	Oulton Park	May 14	(United Kingdom) Ross Curnow	(United Kingdom) Ross Curnow	(United Kingdom) Ross Curnow	(United Kingdom) Nexa Racing
7	Brands Hatch GP	May 20	(Republic of Ireland) Niall Breen	(United Kingdom) Ross Curnow	(United Kingdom) Oliver Turvey	(United Kingdom) Team Loctite Yamaha
8	Brands Hatch GP	May 21	(United Kingdom) Oliver Turvey	(United Kingdom) Matt Howson	(United Kingdom) Matt Howson	(United Kingdom) Filsell Motorsport
9	Thruxton Circuit	June 4	(Republic of Ireland) Niall Breen	(Republic of Ireland) Niall Breen	(Republic of Ireland) Niall Breen	(United Kingdom) Fortec Motorsports
10	Thruxton Circuit	June 4	(Republic of Ireland) Niall Breen	(Republic of Ireland) Niall Breen	(Republic of Ireland) Niall Breen	(United Kingdom) Fortec Motorsports
11	Croft Circuit	July 16	(Republic of Ireland) Niall Breen	(United Kingdom) Oliver Turvey	(Republic of Ireland) Niall Breen	(United Kingdom) Fortec Motorsports
12	Croft Circuit	July 16	(Republic of Ireland) Niall Breen	(United Kingdom) Oliver Turvey	(Republic of Ireland) Niall Breen	(United Kingdom) Fortec Motorsports
13	Donington Park	July 30	(Republic of Ireland) Niall Breen	(United Kingdom) Oliver Oakes	(United Kingdom) Oliver Turvey	(United Kingdom) Team Loctite Yamaha
14	Donington Park	July 30	(Republic of Ireland) Niall Breen	(United Kingdom) Oliver Oakes	(Republic of Ireland) Niall Breen	(United Kingdom) Fortec Motorsports
15	Snetterton Motor Racing Circuit	August 13	(United Kingdom) Oliver Turvey	(Republic of Ireland) Niall Breen	(United Kingdom) Ross Curnow	(United Kingdom) Nexa Racing
16	Snetterton Motor Racing Circuit	August 13	(United Kingdom) Oliver Turvey	(United Kingdom) Ross Curnow	(Republic of Ireland) Niall Breen	(United Kingdom) Fortec Motorsports
17	Knockhill Racing Circuit	September 3	(United Kingdom) Oliver Turvey	(United Kingdom) Euan Hankey	(United Kingdom) Oliver Turvey	(United Kingdom) Team Loctite Yamaha
18	Knockhill Racing Circuit	September 3	(United Kingdom) Oliver Turvey	(United Kingdom) Euan Hankey	(United Kingdom) Oliver Turvey	(United Kingdom) Team Loctite Yamaha
19	Silverstone Circuit	October 15	(United Kingdom) Oliver Turvey	(Republic of Ireland) Niall Breen	(United Kingdom) Oliver Turvey	(United Kingdom) Team Loctite Yamaha
20	Silverstone Circuit	October 15	(United Kingdom) Oliver Turvey	(United Kingdom) Henry Arundel	(Republic of Ireland) Niall Breen	(United Kingdom) Fortec Motorsports

=== Drivers ===
Pos	Driver	BHI (United Kingdom)		MON (Republic of Ireland)		OUL (United Kingdom)		BHGP (United Kingdom)		THR (United Kingdom)		CRO (United Kingdom)		DON (United Kingdom)		SNE (United Kingdom)		KNO (United Kingdom)		SIL (United Kingdom)		Pts
1	(Republic of Ireland) Niall Breen	Ret	2	1	1	4	16	3	3	1	1	1	1	3	1	2	1	2	4	2	1	304
2	(United Kingdom) Oliver Turvey							1	2	5	4	5	3	1	2	7	2	1	1	1	2	209
3	(United Kingdom) Ross Curnow	6	6	2	3	2	1	5	6	9	7	2	2	5	4	1	3	6	6	4	6	203
4	(United Kingdom) Euan Hankey	3	1	4	Ret	1	5	4	21	3	3	7	4	2	5	6	4	8	2	5	7	188
5	(United Kingdom) Michael Meadows	2	3	3	4	Ret	Ret	2	5	2	2	6	5	8	19	9	6	Ret	11	3	3	151
6	(United Kingdom) Oliver Oakes	1	4	6	2	10	4	7	4	4	6	4	7	7	6	14	7	3	3			148
7	(United Kingdom) Jonathan Legris					3	3			6	5	8	12	4	3	4	13	10	7	Ret	4	89
8	(Australia) Michael Patrizi	4	7	5	5	6	7	10	Ret	8	19	3	6	12	Ret	5	11	15	Ret	8	Ret	73
9	(United Kingdom) Henry Arundel (R)	7	9	Ret	6	9	11	8	12	Ret	10	9	8	19	11	3	9	4	5	15	5	63
10	(United Kingdom) Chris Holmes	18	Ret	Ret	15	8	2	21	8	15	11	Ret	Ret	10	Ret	Ret	5	7	9	10	10	38
11	(Japan) Kimiya Sato (R)	10	5	14	17	15	17	12	10	7	8	11	10	6	7	10	19	5	13	9	11	37
12	(Republic of Ireland) Niall Quinn (R)	5	11	7	7	7	Ret	6	7	12	9	12	Ret	20	8	11	12	12	10	Ret	13	36
13	(United Kingdom) Matt Howson					19	6	9	1					11	DNS							28
14	(United Kingdom) Greg Mansell (R)	8	8	9	8	12	12	Ret	11	17	Ret	Ret	9	16	13	8	10	11	Ret	7	8	24
15	(United Kingdom) Richard Singleton					5	8							9	10			9	15			16
16	(United Kingdom) Matthew Hamilton (R)	14	14	11	12	13	9	20	13	18	16	14	15	15	12	13	15	13	12	6	9	10
17	(United Kingdom) Joe Osborne	9	10	10	9			Ret	9	13	12											8
18	(United Kingdom) Paul Rees	Ret	13	8	10																	4
19	(Republic of Ireland) Daniel Murray (R)	16	16	Ret	13	20	14	15	Ret	14	14	Ret	Ret	Ret	16	Ret	21	Ret	8	11	12	3
20	(Australia) Daniel Ricciardo															Ret	8					3
21	(United Kingdom) Daniel McKenzie	11	12	12	11	11	10	11	14	11	Ret	13	14	13	9	12	14	14	14	14	16	3
22	(United Kingdom) Jack Clarke (R)	12	15	19	14	Ret	13	13	15	10	13	10	11	14	17	Ret	22	Ret	19	12	15	2
23	(United Kingdom) Tom Dunstan (R)	15	20	16	16	14	Ret	17	19	22	20	18	Ret	18	14	Ret	18	16	16	13	17	0
24	(Austria) Philipp Eng																			Ret	14	0
25	(United Kingdom) Leo Mansell	19	17	13	Ret	Ret	Ret	18	18	20	15	15	Ret	17	15	16	16	18	20	18	20	0
26	(Australia) Charlie Noble-Mundin	Ret	Ret	18	18	16	15	19	20	21	18	20	18									0
27	(United Kingdom) Roger Orgee (R)	17	18	17	Ret	18	Ret	16	16	16	17	17	16	Ret	18	17	20	17	17	16	19	0
28	(United Kingdom) Marcus Weller	13	19	15	Ret	17	Ret	14	17	19	Ret	19	17			Ret	17	19	18	17	18	0
Pos	Driver	BHI (United Kingdom)		MON (Republic of Ireland)		OUL (United Kingdom)		BHGP (United Kingdom)		THR (United Kingdom)		CRO (United Kingdom)		DON (United Kingdom)		SNE (United Kingdom)		KNO (United Kingdom)		SIL (United Kingdom)		Pts

Colour	Result
Gold	Winner
Silver	Second place
Bronze	Third place
Green	Points classification
Blue	Non-points classification
Blue	Non-classified finish (NC)
Purple	Retired, not classified (Ret)
Red	Did not qualify (DNQ)
Red	Did not pre-qualify (DNPQ)
Black	Disqualified (DSQ)
White	Did not start (DNS)
White	Withdrew (WD)
White	Race cancelled (C)
Blank	Did not practice (DNP)
Blank	Did not arrive (DNA)
Blank	Excluded (EX)
