= Dillon Battistini =

British racing driver

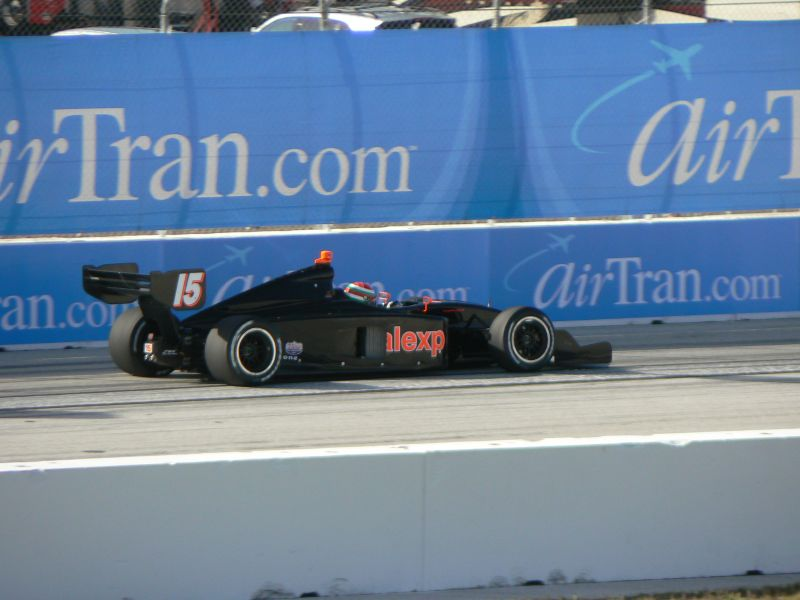
- Battistini driving in Indy Lights at St. Petersburg in 2008
- Nationality: (United Kingdom) British
- Born: 3 December 1977 (age 48) Ewell, England

Firestone Indy Lights Series
- Categorisation: FIA Silver (until 2018); FIA Bronze (2019–)
- Years active: 2008–2010
- Teams: Panther Racing; Team Moore Racing; Genoa Racing; Team PBIR; Bryan Herta Autosport
- Starts: 19
- Wins: 4
- Poles: 1
- Best finish: 6th in 2008

Previous series
- 2006–2007 2003: Asian Formula Three Championship; Caterham R400 Challenge

Championship titles
- 2007: Asian Formula Three Championship

Dillon Matthew Battistini (born 3 December 1977) is a British racecar driver.

== Career ==
Battistini competed in various classes of karting, finishing third in the Junior European Championship and becoming the British Open Champion before moving to cars. In the Caterham R400 challenge in 2003, he won the most races and the driver of the year award, finishing second in the Championship after being taken out from behind in the penultimate race at Brands Hatch which cost him the points lead considering his track position at the time. In 2006 and 2007, he raced in the Asian Formula Three Championship, finishing fourth his first year and winning the 2007 series championship and the most races on five race wins. After testing a Champ Car for Minardi Team USA and the subsequent unification of American Open Wheel Racing, Battistini signed to race in the Firestone Indy Lights Series (formerly the Indy Pro Series) for Panther Racing less than ten days before the season was set to begin. Battistini won his first race in the series which was also his first race on an oval track at Homestead-Miami Speedway on 29 March 2008.

On 24 May, Battistini won the Firestone Freedom 100 at the Indianapolis Motor Speedway from the pole for his second win of the season. Later that week he revealed that he and his team are preparing for him to make his IndyCar Series debut later in 2008. He won two further races at Iowa and Kentucky. For the final race of the year, Battistini left the Panther team to race for Team Moore Racing. Battistini was presented with the Gregory and Appel 'Securing Tomorrow' Award for winning the most races in the season at the 2008 IRL Awards Evening in Las Vegas. He competed in the fourth race of the 2009 season in a one-off for Genoa Racing and has been attempting to find a ride in the IndyCar Series. Having been unable to do so, he made two Indy Lights oval race appearances in 2010 for Team PBIR and Bryan Herta Autosport.

Battistini participated in an IndyCar test with Conquest Racing at Kentucky Speedway on 23 September 2011 and made his IndyCar Series debut with the team in the 2011 season's race at Kentucky. He retired on lap 124 out of 200 due to fatigue.

== Racing record ==
=== American open–wheel racing results ===
(key)

==== Indy Lights Series ====
Year	Team	1	2	3	4	5	6	7	8	9	10	11	12	13	14	15	16	Rank	Points	Ref
2008	Panther Racing	HMS; 1	STP1; 21	STP2; 4	KAN; 4	INDY; 1	MIL; 14	IOW; 1	WGL1; 17	WGL2; 20	NSH; 19	MOH1; 18	MOH2; 19	KTY; 1	SNM1; 18	SNM2; 15		6th	385	
2008	Team Moore Racing																CHI; 23	6th	385	
2009	Genoa Racing	STP1	STP2	LBH	KAN; 15	INDY	MIL	IOW	WGL	TOR	EDM	KTY	MOH	SNM	CHI	HMS		29th	15	
2010	Team PBIR	STP	ALA	LBH	INDY	IOW	WGL	TOR	EDM	MOH	SNM	CHI; 9	KTY					22nd	44	
2010	Bryan Herta Autosport													HMS; 9				22nd	44	

==== IndyCar Series ====
Year	Team	No.	Chassis	Engine	1	2	3	4	5	6	7	8	9	10	11	12	13	14	15	16	17	18	Rank	Points	Ref
2011	Conquest Racing	34	Dallara	Honda	STP	ALA	LBH	SAO	INDY	TXS1	TXS2	MIL	IOW	TOR	EDM	MOH	NHM	SNM	BAL	MOT	KTY; 28	LVS^{1}	46th	10	

^{1} Cancelled after Dan Wheldon died from injuries sustained in a 15-car crash on lap 11.

Sporting positions
Preceded by James Winslow	Asian Formula Three Champion; 2007	Succeeded by Frédéric Vervisch
