= Philip Major =

Canadian racing driver (born 1988)

- Born: December 8, 1988 (age 37) Ottawa, Ontario, Canada

Firestone Indy Lights Series
- Years active: 2010
- Teams: Sam Schmidt Motorsports
- Starts: 13
- Wins: 0
- Poles: 0
- Fastest laps: 1
- Best finish: 9th in 2010

Previous series
- 2008-2009 2006-2007: British F3; Formula BMW USA

Philip Major (born December 8, 1988) is a Canadian retired racing driver.

After karting and amateur racing, Major began professional racing in 2006 in Formula BMW USA. He returned in 2007 and finished tenth in points with a pole and a podium finish. He raced in the British Formula Three Championship in 2008 in the Championship Class for Fortec Motorsport. He completed the full season with three top-ten finishes and finished eighteenth in points, last among Championship Class participants that competed in the full schedule. He joined Carlin Motorsport at nearly the midpoint of the 2009 season and competed in twelve of the twenty races for the team and finished seventeenth in points.

For 2010, Major returned to North America to race in the Firestone Indy Lights Series for Sam Schmidt Motorsports. He finished 9th in points with a best finish of third at Chicagoland Speedway. He also had the fastest lap at Iowa Speedway.

In 2018, Major started a new career path in the fintech industry, working at the leading Canadian online investment platform, FrontFundr, as a Due Diligence Analyst.

== Indy Lights ==
Year	Team	1	2	3	4	5	6	7	8	9	10	11	12	13	Rank	Points	Ref
2010	Sam Schmidt Motorsports	STP; 14	ALA; 10	LBH; 7	INDY; 6	IOW; 6	WGL; 6	TOR; 12	EDM; 10	MOH; 10	SNM; 11	CHI; 3	KTY; 13	HMS; 8	9th	299	
