= Niall Breen (racing driver) =

Irish racing driver (born 1986)

- Nationality: (Republic of Ireland) Irish
- Born: 8 May 1986 (age 40) Dundalk, Ireland

Niall Breen (born 8 May 1986 in Dundalk) is an Irish former racing driver. He competed in karting and auto racing, including in the Formula Three Euroseries, the British F3 Championship, and Formula BMW UK where he was 2006 driver's champion.

Following his racing career, Breen became a solicitor.

Sporting positions
Preceded by Dean Smith	Formula BMW UK; Champion; 2006	Succeeded by Marcus Ericsson
