= Brandon Wagner (racing driver) =

American racing driver (born 1987)

- Nationality: American
- Born: April 3, 1987 (age 39) Lafayette, Indiana, U.S.

Firestone Indy Lights
- Years active: 2008–2012
- Former teams: Wagner Racing; Davey Hamilton Racing; Team Moore Racing; Team E
- Starts: 19
- Wins: 1
- Poles: 1
- Best finish: 13th in 2010

Previous series
- 2004–2007: USAC National Midget Division

Brandon Wagner (born April 3, 1987) is an American former racing driver from Lafayette, Indiana. He is a graduate of Central Catholic High School and graduate of Purdue University.

Beginning in karting in 1999, Wagner moved to USAC Midgets in 2004, competing for his father John's team. The family purchased a Firestone Indy Lights Series Dallara chassis in mid-2008 and he made his debut in the final race of the season at Chicagoland Speedway. He competed part-time in the 2009 season with the team being run in conjunction with Davey Hamilton and Kingdom Racing. He captured his first pole with Kingdom Racing on August 29, 2009, at Chicagoland Speedway but was involved in an early race accident and did not finish. Wagner made his 2010 debut in the Freedom 100 with Davey Hamilton/Kingdom Racing where he captured his best Indy Lights finish of eighth. The team continued running a partial season of ovals, similar to the schedule they ran in 2009. On October 2, 2010, Wagner captured his first win in the Firestone Indy Lights Series at Homestead Miami Speedway after passing polesitter Pippa Mann at the start and dueling with James Hinchcliffe for much of the race. Wagner continued part-time on ovals in 2011 with a best finish of fourth at Kentucky Speedway and finished fifteenth in points. He drove in the 2012 Freedom 100 for Team E, his only race of the season to round out his career in Indy Lights.

Wagner has since retired from racing and is a Chiropractor in Zionsville, Indiana.

== Racing record ==
=== American open–wheel racing results ===
(key)

==== Indy Lights ====
Year	Team	1	2	3	4	5	6	7	8	9	10	11	12	13	14	15	16	Rank	Points
2008	Alliance-Wagner Motorsports	HMS	STP1	STP2	KAN	INDY	MIL	IOW	WGL1	WGL2	NSH	MOH1	MOH2	KTY	SNM1	SNM2	CHI; 15	37th	15
2009	Davey Hamilton/Kingdom Racing	STP1; 20	STP2; 18	LBH	KAN	INDY; 11	MIL	IOW; 16	WGL	TOR	EDM	KTY; 11	MOH	SNM	CHI; 15	HMS; 17		24th	103
2010	Davey Hamilton Racing	STP	ALA	LBH	INDY; 8	IOW; 12	WGL	TOR	EDM	MOH	SNM	CHI; 12	KTY; 8	HMS; 1				13th	136
2011	Davey Hamilton Racing	STP	ALA	LBH	INDY; 14	MIL; 11	IOW; DNS	TOR	EDM1	EDM2	TRO							15th	134
2011	Team Moore Racing											NHM; 9	BAL	KTY; 4	LVS; 6			15th	134
2012	Team E	STP	ALA	LBH	INDY; 16	DET	MIL	IOW	TOR	EDM	TRO	BAL	FON					28th	14
