= Jonathan Legris =

British racing driver

- Nationality: (United Kingdom) British
- Born: Jonathan Sean Legris; 5 November 1987 (age 39) Bournemouth (United Kingdom)

Previous series
- 2009, 2013; 2008; 2008; 2007; 2005-2007; 2006: European F3 Open; British Formula 3; Spanish Formula 3; Formula Palmer Audi; Formula BMW UK; Formula 3 Asia

Jonathan Sean Legris (born 5 November 1987) is a British former racing driver. He previously competed in series such as Formula BMW UK, the British Formula Three Championship and the European F3 Open Championship.

== Career ==
Legris competed in karting from age six, including in notable series such as Super 1 and the FIA European Karting championship alongside contemporaries including Sam Bird, Romain Grosjean and Paul di Resta. Legris and was awarded a £35,000 BMW scholarship before joining the Formula BMW UK grid in 2005. After completing the 20 race season, Legris competed in three races of the 2005 Formula 3 Asia series. Despite strong running on his debut, Legris retired from the top three and would go on to score a total of four points in the championship.

Legris returned to Formula BMW UK with Motaworld Racing in 2006 and 2007. His first, and only, Formula BMW UK victory came at Donington Park in July 2007. He competed in the 2007 Formula Palmer Audi autumn trophy, scoring a podium finish on his first race weekend at Brands Hatch, but ultimately finishing 6th overall. For 2008, Legris joined Team West-tech in Spanish F3 and scored a number of podium finishes for the team on his way to 11th in the overall championship. As his car the older Dallara chassis, Legris qualified for classification in the Copa championship, a category he would finish third in with three race victories. The championship ran at the Valencia Street Circuit as a support race to the 2008 European Grand Prix weekend, where Legris showed strong pace but ultimately crashed out of the race. Following his performances in Spain, Legris was signed by Litespeed F3 to compete in the final rounds of the 2008 British F3. Legris secured a podium finish at Brands Hatch.

For 2009, Legris raced for De Vilotta Motorsport, completing two races and taking a single victory in class at Valencia. Legris would not race again until 2013, when he returned to European F3 with West-tec.

== Personal life ==
In 2003, Legris was diagnosed with Hodgkins Lymphoma, subsequently missing the entire 2004 motor racing season.

=== Criminal conviction ===
In February 2015, Legris was sentenced to two years in prison after being convicted of assisting an offender. His father, Pierre, had murdered his second wife Rui Li and Legris subsequently moved the body for his father in the boot of his own Fiat Punto. Li's body was found in the Fiat owned by Legris. Legris was tried at Winchester Crown Court, represented by Bernard Tetlow KC. Whilst convicted on one count, Legris was acquitted of conspiracy to murder. His father, Pierre, was sentenced to life imprisonment and his mother three years imprisonment for her role in the crime.

== Career summary ==
Season	Series	Team	Races	Wins	Poles	F/Laps	Podiums	Points	Position
2005	Formula BMW UK	Pegasus Motorsport	20	0	0	1	0	22	16th
2005	Formula 3 Asia	Tuason Racing School	3	0	0	0	0	4	16th
2006	Formula BMW UK	Motaworld Racing	14	0	1	0	3	89	7th
2007	Formula BMW UK	Motaworld Racing	18	1	0	1	4	480	7th
2007	Formula Palmer Audi - Autumn Trophy	MSV	6	0	0	3	1	77	6th
2008	Spanish Formula 3	Team West-Tec	17	0	0	1	3	48	11th
2008	British Formula 3	Litespeed F3	6	0	0	0	1	38	9th
2009	European F3 Open	Emilio de Villota	10	1	0	2	3	47	7th
2013	European F3 Open	Team West-Tec	2	0	0	0	0	1	29th
