= Freedom 100 =

Automobile race

Indy Lights
- Venue: Indianapolis Motor Speedway
- First race: 2003
- First Lights race: 2003
- Last race: 2019
- Distance: 100 miles (160 km)
- Laps: 40
- Previous names: Firestone Freedom 100 (2008–2013); Futaba Freedom 100 (2004–2005)
- Most wins (driver): Wade Cunningham (3)
- Most wins (team): Sam Schmidt Motorsports (7)

The Freedom 100 was an automobile race held annually at the Indianapolis Motor Speedway in Speedway, Indiana, as part of the Indy Lights. The event was a support race for the IndyCar Series Indianapolis 500, and since 2005, it was held on the Friday preceding the Indianapolis 500, the day known as "Carb Day".

The Freedom 100 was the second race annually at the Indianapolis Motor Speedway, the other being the Grand Prix on the combined road course.

== Race history ==
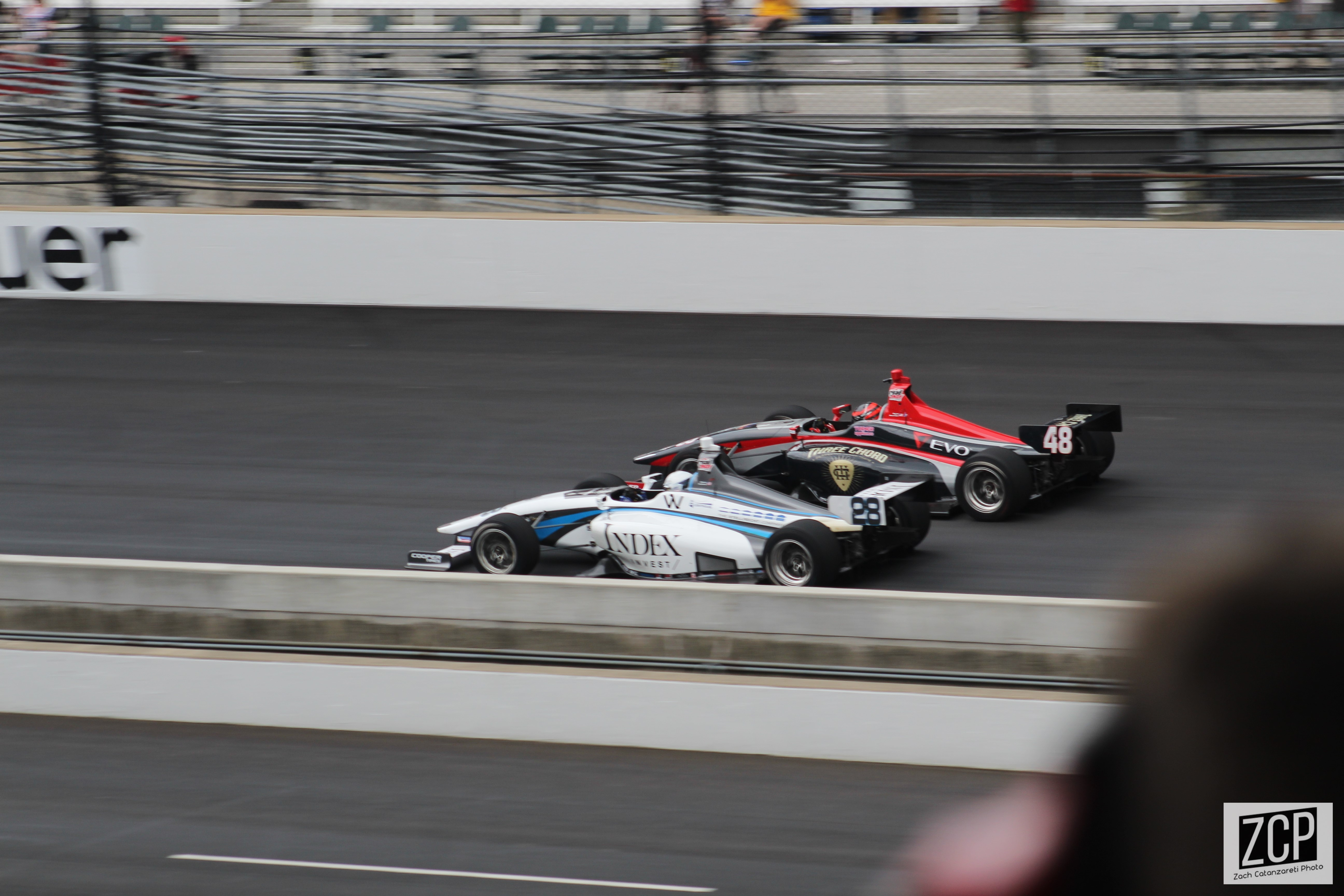
2019 Freedom 100

The Freedom 100 has its origins in both USAC's Mini Indy series and CART's ARS/Indy Lights series. None of those support series ever raced at the Indianapolis Motor Speedway. Typically the support series would take the month of May off while the top-level Indy cars were at the Indianapolis 500. In 1979, USAC's Mini-Indy series scheduled a support race on the oval at nearby Indianapolis Raceway Park, but it was held only once.

When the IRL started the Indy Pro Series in 2002, officials began exploring the possibility of holding a support race at Indianapolis in the days leading up to the Indianapolis 500. It was an attempt to fill an otherwise slow part of the month, and an opportunity for exposure for up-and-coming drivers and teams. The race was added to the calendar for 2003.

For the first two years, the race was held during the second weekend of Indianapolis 500 time trials, scheduled for Saturday which was at the time, used only for Indy 500 practice. The date proved to be unpopular and drew small crowds. In 2005, Carb Day, the traditional final day of practice for the Indy 500, was moved from Thursday before the Indy 500 to Friday. Series officials moved the Freedom 100 to Carb Day, immediately following the final Indy 500 practice session. The move proved popular with fans and competitors.

In 2008, in the wake of the merger between IRL and Champ Car, the series was renamed from Indy Pro Series to the Firestone Indy Lights Series, taking the name of Champ Car's former development series which had ceased in 2001. The new sponsorship extended to this race, renaming it the Firestone Freedom 100.

In the first nine runnings, the race was won six times from the pole and three times from second starting position. Therefore, the race had always been won from the front row until Esteban Guerrieri won in 2012 from the 18th starting position. In 2013, Peter Dempsey, who started third, won the Freedom 100 in what was then the closest finish in Speedway history (0.0026 secs) in a four-wide finish over Gabby Chaves, Sage Karam, and Carlos Muñoz. Dempsey went from fourth to first on the final straightaway.

In 2016, the field lined up in order of points, as qualifying has been rained out. Pole sitter and series point leader, Carlin's Ed Jones, traded the lead with Andretti Autosport's Dean Stoneman until a caution on lap 36 slowed the field. The green flag flew with one lap to go and Stoneman pulled alongside Jones going into Turn Three. The pair held their positions through the North Short Chute and into Turn Four; as they crossed the line, Stoneman held the lead by the slimmest possible margin, winning by 0.0024 seconds – a new Indianapolis Motor Speedway Record.

Carlin's Matheus Leist took the race victory from pole position in 2017, while Colton Herta earned the win in 2018. Herta's Freedom 100 victory made it a clean sweep of the month of May for the young second-generation driver, who won both Indy Lights races on the road course at the INDYCAR Grand Prix.

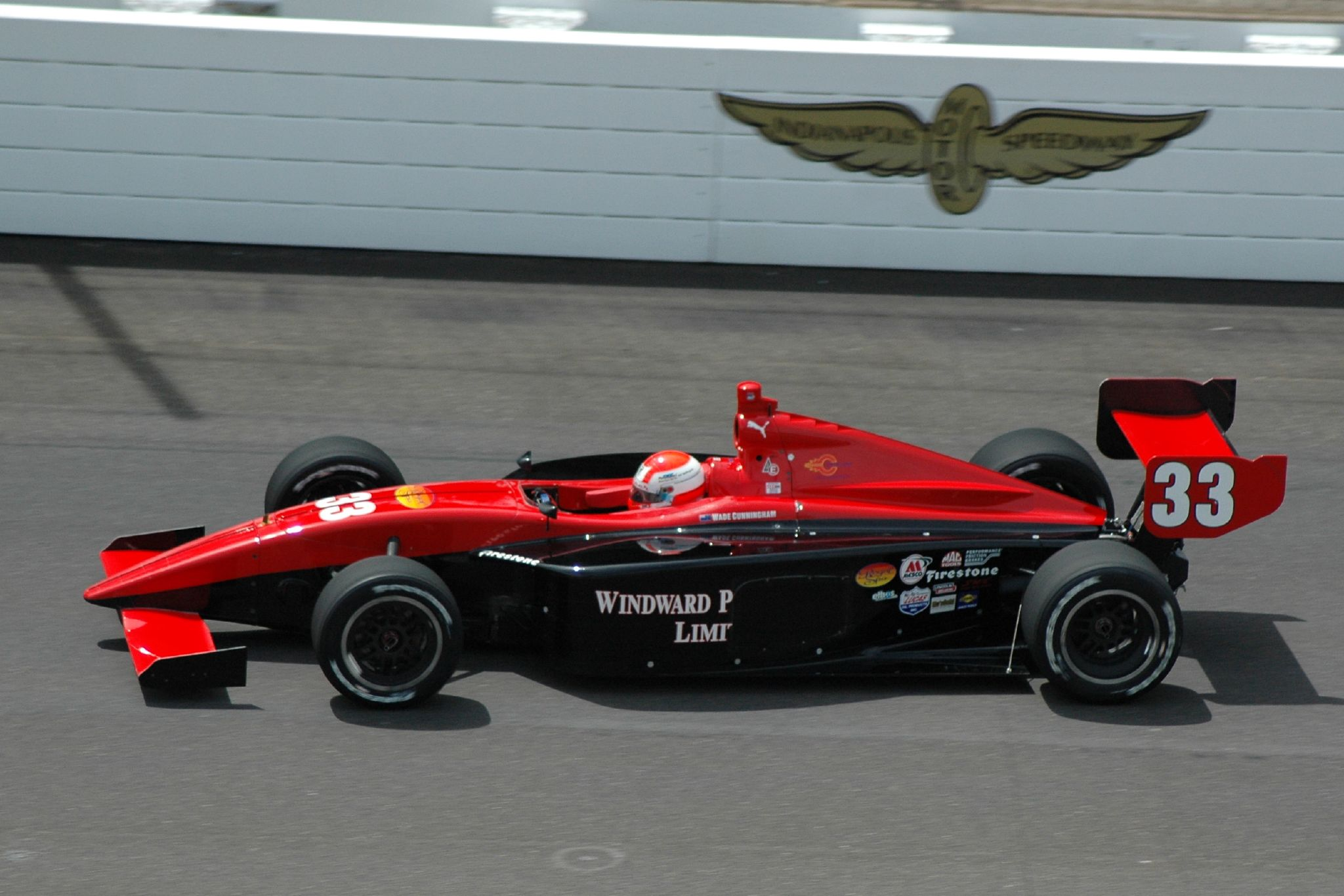
Wade Cunningham (pictured in 2008) won the race three times

In 2019, Andretti Autosport's Oliver Askew took the race win in typically dramatic fashion, passing teammate Ryan Norman at the line by a mere 0.0067 seconds – the fourth closest finish in the history of the Indianapolis Motor Speedway. There were 12 official lead changes at the start/finish line, but nearly 100 passes for position throughout the 40-lap race. The race starting order was altered post-qualifying when five cars failed post-qualifying technical inspection and were relegated to the back of the field, though this number did not include pole sitter Robert Megennis.

The 2020 edition of the race was cancelled after the Indy Lights season was also cancelled. The race was axed from Lights' 2021 calendar. IndyCar took responsibility for the move, claiming it was to ensure for a smooth Indianapolis 500 weekend.

== Race results ==
Year	Date	Day	Winning Driver	Race Distance		Time of Race	Winning Speed	Starting Cars	Lead Changes	Ref
Year	Date	Day	Winning Driver	Miles	Laps	Time of Race	Winning Speed	Starting Cars	Lead Changes	Ref
2003	May 17–18 ^{a}	Sat.–Sun.	(United States) Ed Carpenter	100	40	55:02.1661	109.019 mph (175.449 km/h)	19	2	
2004	May 22	Saturday	(Brazil) Thiago Medeiros	100	40	42:16.4388	141.931 mph (228.416 km/h)	17	2	
2005	May 27	Friday	(Brazil) Jaime Camara	100	40	40:52.6390	146.780 mph (236.220 km/h)	18	7	
2006	May 26	Friday	(New Zealand) Wade Cunningham	100	40	32:29.3233	184.679 mph (297.212 km/h)	19	0	
2007	May 25	Friday	(United Kingdom) Alex Lloyd	100	40	46:39.6029	128.590 mph (206.946 km/h)	24	0	
2008	May 24 ^{b}	Saturday	(United Kingdom) Dillon Battistini	100	40	39:46.9495	150.820 mph (242.721 km/h)	27	4	
2009	May 22	Friday	(New Zealand) Wade Cunningham	100	40	50:42.2548	118.333 mph (190.439 km/h)	22	9	
2010	May 28	Friday	(New Zealand) Wade Cunningham	100	40	39:55.4552	150.285 mph (241.860 km/h)	16	4	
2011	May 27	Friday	(United States) Josef Newgarden	100	40	55:38.9881	107.817 mph (173.515 km/h)	18	6	
2012	May 25	Friday	(Argentina) Esteban Guerrieri	100	40	40:09.1965	149.427 mph (240.479 km/h)	19 ^{c}	3	
2013	May 24	Friday	(Republic of Ireland) Peter Dempsey	100	40	36:48.6540	162.995 mph (262.315 km/h)	11	2	
2014	May 23	Friday	(Colombia) Gabby Chaves	100	40	41:46.9680	143.600 mph (231.102 km/h)	11	9	
2015	May 22	Friday	(United Kingdom) Jack Harvey	100	40	33:21.2712	179.886 mph (289.498 km/h)	11	6	
2016	May 27	Friday	(United Kingdom) Dean Stoneman	100	40	41:08.6299	145.830 mph (234.691 km/h)	16	3	
2017	May 26	Friday	(Brazil) Matheus Leist	100	40	36:36.6934	163.883 mph (263.744 km/h)	14	0	
2018	May 25	Friday	(United States) Colton Herta	100	40	31:20.6650	191.422 mph (308.064 km/h)	8	20	
2019	May 24	Friday	(United States) Oliver Askew	100	40	42:02.6912	142.705 mph (229.661 km/h)	11	12	

^{a} In 2003 the race started on Saturday May 17, but was halted by rain. It was completed the following day.
^{b} The 2008 race was scheduled for Friday May 23 but postponed one day due to rain.
^{c} In 2012, Anders Krohn qualified for the race, but was unable to start due to mechanical problems. He was credited with the 19th-place finish. Therefore, only 18 cars took the green flag.

== Qualification results ==
Year	Date	Day	Pole Sitter / Fast Qualifier	Pole 2-Lap Qualifying Time	Pole Speed	Number of Qualifiers	Slow Qualifier Speed	Mean Qualifying Speed
2003	May 16	Friday	(United States) Ed Carpenter	1:35.4958	188.490 mph (303.345 km/h)	18	179.550 mph (288.958 km/h)	184.460 mph (296.860 km/h)
2004	May 21	Friday	(Brazil) Thiago Medeiros	1:35.1000	189.274 mph (304.607 km/h)	17	178.100 mph (286.624 km/h)	186.302 mph (299.824 km/h)
2005	May 26	Thursday	(Brazil) Jaime Camara	1:34.8018	189.870 mph (305.566 km/h)	17	168.816 mph (271.683 km/h)	184.892 mph (297.555 km/h)
2006	May 25	Thursday	(New Zealand) Wade Cunningham	1:36.5546	186.423 mph (300.019 km/h)	18	171.844 mph (276.556 km/h)	181.753 mph (292.503 km/h)
2007	May 24	Thursday	(Canada) Ken Losch	1:35.6271	188.231 mph (302.928 km/h)	24	183.436 mph (295.212 km/h)	186.052 mph (299.422 km/h)
2008	May 22	Thursday	(United Kingdom) Dillon Battistini	1:35.5430	188.397 mph (303.196 km/h)	27	178.497 mph (287.263 km/h)	186.196 mph (299.653 km/h)
2009	May 21	Thursday	(New Zealand) Wade Cunningham	1:34.6485	190.177 mph (306.060 km/h)	22	185.269 mph (298.162 km/h)	187.749 mph (302.153 km/h)
2010	May 27	Thursday	(United Kingdom) Pippa Mann	1:35.7505	187.989 mph (302.539 km/h)	15	183.479 mph (295.281 km/h)	185.988 mph (299.319 km/h)
2011	May 26	Thursday	(United States) Bryan Clauson	Grid set by entrant points due to rain.				
2012	May 24	Thursday	(Colombia) Gustavo Yacamán	1:35.9913	187.517 mph (301.779 km/h)	19	184.494 mph (296.914 km/h)	185.828 mph (299.061 km/h)
2013	May 23	Thursday	(United States) Sage Karam	1:35.1160	189.243 mph (304.557 km/h)	11	185.967 mph (299.285 km/h)	187.412 mph (301.610 km/h)
2014	May 22	Thursday	(Brazil) Luiz Razia	1:35.8926	187.710 mph (302.090 km/h)	11	182.697 mph (294.022 km/h)	185.056 mph (297.819 km/h)
2015	May 21	Thursday	(United States) Ethan Ringel	1:31.0545	197.684 mph (318.142 km/h)	12	194.404 mph (312.863 km/h)	195.909 mph (315.285 km/h)
2016	May 26	Thursday	(United Arab Emirates) Ed Jones	Grid set by entrant points due to rain.				
2017	May 25	Thursday	(Brazil) Matheus Leist	1:30.3625	199.198 mph (320.578 km/h)	14	195.445 mph (314.538 km/h)	196.984 mph (317.015 km/h)
2018	May 24	Thursday	(Canada) Dalton Kellett	1:32.2947	195.027 mph (313.866 km/h)	8	193.269 mph (311.036 km/h)	194.054 mph (312.300 km/h)
2019	May 23	Thursday	(United States) Robert Megennis	1:32.6851	194.206 mph (312.544 km/h)	11	191.304 mph (307.874 km/h)	192.462 mph (309.738 km/h)^{1}

1. Five cars in the field had their qualifying runs disallowed for failing technical inspection, leaving only six official times.

== Event records ==
	Year	Driver	Time	Speed	Distance	Laps
Fastest race	2018	(United States) Colton Herta	31:20.6650	191.422 mph (308.064 km/h)	100 mi (160 km)	40
Fastest qualification run	2017	(Brazil) Matheus Leist	01:30.3625	199.198 mph (320.578 km/h)	5 mi (8.0 km)	2
Fastest qualifying lap	2017	(Brazil) Matheus Leist	00:45.1654	199.268 mph (320.691 km/h)	2.5 mi (4.0 km)	1
Fastest race lap	2017	(Uruguay) Santiago Urrutia	00:45.4307	198.104 mph (318.817 km/h)	2.5 mi (4.0 km)	1
Most wins by a driver	2006; 2009; 2010	(New Zealand) Wade Cunningham	3 Wins			
Most starts by a driver	2005–2010	(New Zealand) Wade Cunningham	6 Starts			
Most participants	2008	27 Starting Drivers				

== Drivers ==
In the first seventeen years that this race has been contested, 166 drivers have participated:

drivers who went on to race in the Indianapolis 500, after first participating in the Freedom 100.
drivers who had already driven in the Indianapolis 500, before participating in the Freedom 100.
drivers who attempted unsuccessfully to race in the Indianapolis 500

Driver	Nation	Starts	First	Latest	Best Finishing Position	Best Finish Year	Laps led
Mishael Abbott	USA	2	2005	2006	11	2005	0
Neil Alberico	USA	2	2016	2017	4	2017	0
Cyndie Allemann	Switzerland	1	2008	2008	26	2008	0
Scott Anderson	USA	2	2014	2015	3	2015	0
Jarett Andretti	USA	1	2019	2019	6	2019	0
Marco Andretti	USA	1	2005	2005	16	2005	0
Richard Antinucci	USA	1	2008	2008	2	2008	0
Oliver Askew	USA	1	2019	2019	1	2019	3
Chase Austin	USA	4	2011	2014	8	2013	0
Rodrigo Barbosa	Brazil	2	2009	2010	12	2010	0
Alexandre Baron	France	1	2014	2014	7	2014	0
Dillon Battistini	United Kingdom	1	2008	2008	1	2008	38
Matt Beardsley	USA	2	2003	2004	8	2004	0
Ana Beatriz Figueiredo	Brazil	2	2008	2009	5	2008	0
Shelby Blackstock	USA	3	2015	2017	4	2016	0
Matthew Brabham	USA	1	2014	2014	2	2014	28
Jon Brownson	USA	2	2007	2008	9	2007	0
Nick Bussell	USA	2	2006	2006	10	2006	0
Jaime Camara	Brazil	3	2005	2007	1	2005	33
Adrian Campos, Jr.	Spain	1	2010	2010	10	2010	0
Victor Carbone	Brazil	2	2011	2012	6	2012	25
Tyce Carlson	USA	1	2006	2006	15	2006	0
Ed Carpenter	USA	1	2003	2003	1	2003	39
Cole Carter	USA	1	2005	2005	18	2005	0
Gabby Chaves	Colombia	2	2013	2014	1	2014	6
James Chesson	USA	1	2006	2006	18	2006	0
Heamin Choi	South Korea	1	2016	2016	12	2016	0
Marco Cioci	Italy	1	2003	2003	9	2003	0
Dan Clarke	United Kingdom	1	2010	2010	4	2010	0
Bryan Clauson	USA	1	2011	2011	5	2011	0
Wade Cunningham	New Zealand	6	2005	2010	1	2006; 2009; 2010	99
Paul Dana	USA	2	2003	2004	7	2003	0
Nicolas Dapero	Argentina	1	2017	2017	12	2017	0
James Davison	Australia	2	2008	2009	6	2009	1
Alon Day	Israel	1	2012	2012	8	2012	0
Zachary Claman DeMelo	Canada	2	2016	2017	6	2017	0
Peter Dempsey	Ireland	3	2011	2013	1	2013	1
Geoff Dodge	USA	1	2006	2006	8	2006	0
Craig Dollansky	USA	1	2003	2003	17	2003	0
Pablo Donoso	Chile	2	2008	2009	9	2009	0
Jay Drake	USA	2	2004	2005	3	2005	0
Armaan Ebrahim	India	1	2012	2012	13	2012	0
R. C. Enerson	USA	2	2015	2016	4	2015	0
Brandon Erwin	USA	1	2003	2003	11	2003	0
Duarte Ferreira	Angola	1	2011	2011	13	2011	0
Chris Festa	USA	4	2005	2008	2	2007	0
Aaron Fike	USA	1	2003	2003	6	2003	0
Taylor Fletcher	USA	2	2004	2005	9	2005	0
Victor Franzoni	Brazil	1	2018	2018	8	2018	2
Juan Pablo Garcia	Mexico	4	2011	2014	6	2014	0
Victor Garcia	Spain	1	2011	2011	3	2011	0
Phil Giebler	USA	2	2004	2006	5	2004	0
Micky Gilbert	USA	2	2007	2008	15	2007	0
Logan Gomez	USA	2	2007	2008	7	2008	0
Jorge Goncalvez	Venezuela	3	2011	2013	6	2013	0
Travis Gregg	USA	1	2005	2005	6	2005	0
Mikael Grenier	Canada	1	2011	2011	10	2011	0
Esteban Guerrieri	Argentina	2	2011	2012	1	2012	5
Sean Guthrie	USA	3	2006	2008	11	2006	0
Davey Hamilton Jr.	USA	1	2018	2018	7	2018	0
Matthew Hamilton	New Zealand	1	2006	2006	13	2006	0
Scott Hargrove	Canada	1	2016	2016	5	2016	0
Scott Harrington	USA	1	2003	2003	12	2003	0
Jack Harvey	United Kingdom	2	2014	2015	1	2015	10
Jack Hawksworth	United Kingdom	1	2013	2013	10	2013	0
Jon Herb	USA	3	2004	2006	13	2005	1
Daniel Herrington	USA	1	2009	2009	7	2009	0
Colton Herta	USA	2	2017	2018	1	2018	10
J. R. Hildebrand	USA	2	2008	2009	2	2009	23
James Hinchcliffe	Canada	2	2009	2010	3	2010	0
João Victor Horto	Brazil	1	2012	2012	7	2012	0
Jay Howard	United Kingdom	2	2006	2009	2	2006	0
Imran Husain	India	1	2005	2005	14	2005	0
Alistair Jackson	United Kingdom	1	2009	2009	19	2009	0
Brad Jaeger	USA	1	2007	2007	21	2007	0
Nico Jamin	France	1	2017	2017	10	2017	0
Shane Jantzi	Canada	1	2007	2007	18	2007	0
Matt Jaskol	USA	1	2007	2007	7	2007	0
Ronnie Johncox	USA	1	2003	2003	8	2003	0
Ed Jones	UAE	2	2015	2016	2	2016	10
Ryan Justice	USA	1	2007	2007	13	2007	0
Kyle Kaiser	USA	3	2015	2017	5	2015	0
Sage Karam	USA	1	2013	2013	3	2013	12
Dalton Kellett	Canada	4	2016	2019	3	2016; 2017; 2018	17
Charlie Kimball	USA	2	2009	2010	2	2010	2
Jonathan Klein	USA	2	2006	2007	6	2006	0
Lucas Kohl	Brazil	1	2019	2019	7	2019	0
Anders Krohn	Norway	2	2011	2012	12	2011	7
Mike Larrison	USA	1	2012	2012	9	2012	0
Matheus Leist	Brazil	1	2017	2017	1	2017	40
Alex Lloyd	United Kingdom	2	2006	2007	1	2007	40
Ken Losch	Canada	1	2007	2007	24	2007	0
Arie Luyendyk Jr.	Netherlands	4	2003	2010	3	2004	0
Leonardo Maia	Brazil	1	2004	2004	6	2004	0
Philip Major	Canada	1	2010	2010	6	2010	0
David Malukas	USA	1	2019	2019	11	2019	0
Pippa Mann	United Kingdom	2	2009	2010	16	2010	0
Jesse Mason	Canada	2	2004	2009	8	2009	0
Raphael Matos	Brazil	1	2008	2008	10	2008	0
Thiago Medeiros	Brazil	2	2003	2004	1	2004	35
Robert Megennis	USA	1	2019	2019	8	2019	2
Zack Meyer	Canada	1	2014	2014	10	2014	0
Rusty Mitchell	USA	1	2011	2011	7	2011	0
Rocky Moran Jr.	USA	1	2005	2005	17	2005	0
Carlos Muñoz	Colombia	2	2012	2013	2	2012	27
Hideki Mutoh	Japan	1	2007	2007	5	2007	0
André Negrão	Brazil	1	2016	2016	15	2016	0
Josef Newgarden	USA	1	2011	2011	1	2011	30
Emerson Newton-John	USA	1	2012	2012	17	2012	0
Ryan Norman	USA	3	2017	2019	2	2019	29
Kyle O'Gara	USA	1	2013	2013	11	2013	0
Patricio O'Ward	Mexico	1	2018	2018	2	2018	3
Mark Olson	USA	1	2008	2008	25	2008	0
David Ostella	Canada	2	2011	2012	8	2011	0
Robbie Pecorari	USA	2	2007	2008	4	2008	0
Gary Peterson	USA	2	2003	2004	13	2004	0
Juan Piedrahita	Colombia	4	2014	2017	7	2015	0
Spencer Pigot	USA	1	2015	2015	9	2015	0
Martin Plowman	United Kingdom	2	2009	2010	5	2010	0
Brad Pollard	USA	1	2004	2004	11	2004	0
Mike Potekhen	USA	3	2007	2009	6	2007	0
Andrew Prendeville	USA	3	2007	2009	4	2007	0
Rolando Quintanilla	Mexico	2	2003	2004	10	2003	0
German Quiroga	Mexico	1	2005	2005	10	2005	0
Sean Rayhall	USA	1	2015	2015	6	2015	0
Luiz Razia	Brazil	1	2014	2014	4	2014	5
Jonny Reid	New Zealand	1	2008	2008	20	2008	0
Garth Rickards	USA	1	2017	2017	7	2017	0
Ethan Ringel	USA	1	2015	2015	2	2015	30
Billy Roe	USA	2	2003	2004	9	2004	0
Mario Romancini	Brazil	1	2009	2009	3	2009	0
Felix Rosenqvist	Sweden	1	2016	2016	9	2016	0
Marty Roth	Canada	2	2004	2005	5	2005	0
Sebastián Saavedra	Colombia	3	2009	2012	5	2009; 2012	3
Joey Scarallo	Australia	1	2007	2007	20	2007	0
Félix Serrallés	Puerto Rico	2	2015	2016	6	2016	0
Brent Sherman	USA	1	2008	2008	16	2008	0
Jeff Simmons	USA	5	2003	2010	2	2004	5
Jimmy Simpson	USA	1	2013	2013	7	2013	0
Stephen Simpson	South Africa	1	2007	2007	14	2007	0
Jake Slotten	USA	1	2008	2008	23	2008	0
Toby Sowery	United Kingdom	1	2019	2019	4	2019	0
Dean Stoneman	United Kingdom	1	2016	2016	1	2016	30
Junior Strous	Netherlands	1	2009	2009	10	2009	0
Jonathan Summerton	USA	1	2009	2009	12	2009	0
Mark Taylor	United Kingdom	1	2003	2003	3	2003	1
Aaron Telitz	USA	3	2017	2019	2	2017	0
Al Unser III	USA	3	2005	2008	4	2005	0
Jonathan Urlin	USA	1	2003	2003	5	2003	0
Santiago Urrutia	Uruguay	3	2016	2018	4	2018	8
Brett Van Blankers	Canada	1	2006	2006	14	2006	0
Tristan Vautier	France	1	2012	2012	3	2012	11
Zach Veach	USA	3	2013	2016	3	2014	1
Rinus VeeKay	Netherlands	1	2019	2019	3	2019	6
Jean-Karl Vernay	France	1	2010	2010	13	2010	0
Brandon Wagner	USA	4	2009	2012	8	2010	0
Oliver Webb	United Kingdom	1	2012	2012	15	2012	0
Tom Wieringa	USA	3	2006	2008	12	2006	0
Marc Williams	New Zealand	2	2007	2008	15	2008	0
Bobby Wilson	USA	3	2006	2008	6	2008	0
Stefan Wilson	United Kingdom	2	2010	2011	4	2011	1
Chris Windom	USA	1	2019	2019	10	2019	0
James Winslow	United Kingdom	1	2011	2011	17	2011	0
Cory Witherill	USA	2	2003	2004	2	2003	0
Tom Wood	Canada	3	2003	2006	9	2006	0
Gustavo Yacaman	Colombia	4	2009	2012	4	2012	1

=== Freedom 100 and Indianapolis 500 "Double" ===
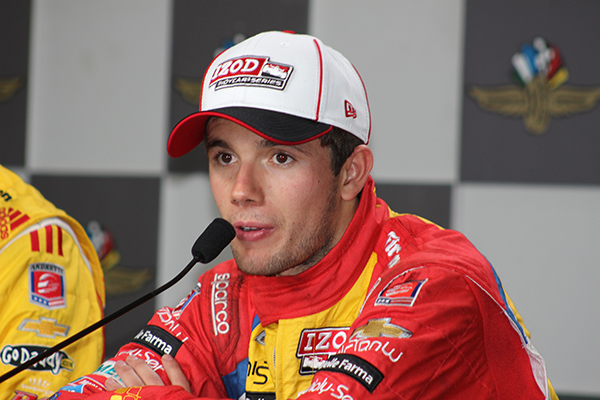
Carlos Muñoz finished 2nd at the 2013 Indianapolis 500, his first ever IndyCar Series race

Since the Freedom 100 began in 2003, four different drivers have competed both in this race and in the Indianapolis 500, during the same month.

Year	Driver	Freedom 100 Finish	Indianapolis 500 finish
2004	(Canada) Marty Roth	16	24
2004	(United States) Jeff Simmons	2	16
2005	(Canada) Marty Roth	5	31
2008	(United States) Jeff Simmons	8	28
2010	(Colombia) Sebastián Saavedra	9	23
2012	(Colombia) Sebastián Saavedra	5	26
2013	(Colombia) Carlos Muñoz	4	2

== Sources ==
- Firestone Indy Lights stats
- Champ Car Stats – Indy Lights/Indy Pro Series
