= Andersen Racing =

- Founded: 1998
- Base: Palmetto, Florida
- Team principal(s): Dan Andersen
- Current series: Karting
- Former series: Formula Continental; USF2000; Star Mazda; Indy Lights; F2000 Championship Series; Formula SCCA
- Drivers' Championships: 2008 F2000 Championship Series
- Website: Official website

Andersen Racing was a professional auto racing team that competed in Firestone Indy Lights and Star Mazda competition. It was owned by Dan Andersen, who founded the U.S. F2000 National Championship in 1991 and his brother John Andersen. The team was formed in 1999 and competed in amateur SCCA Formula Continental and the similar F2000 Championship pro series.

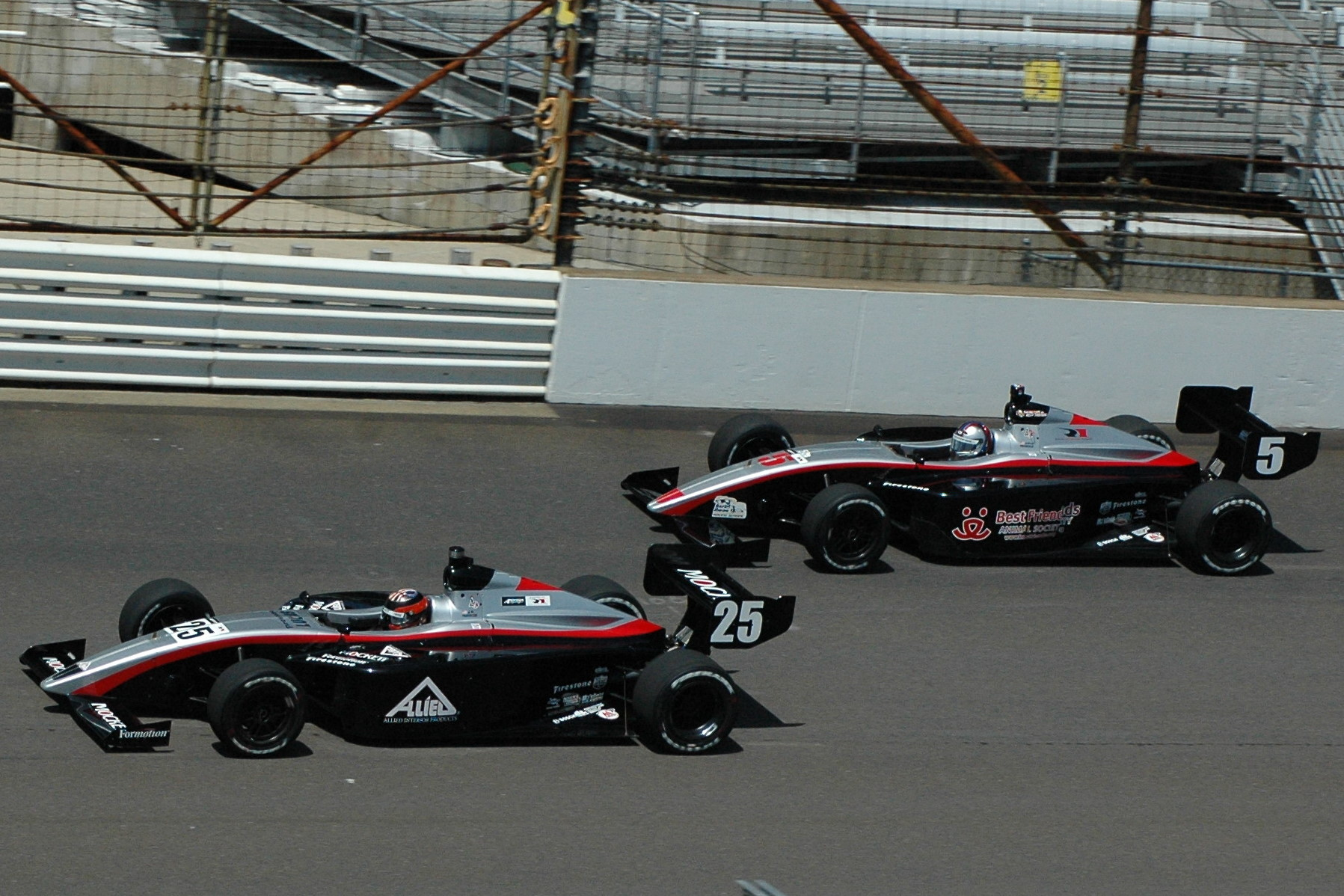
The team's cars in 2008 driven by J. R. Hildebrand (left) and Andrew Prendeville (right)

In 2006 the team began racing in Star Mazda and they began racing in Indy Lights in 2007 fielding a car for Andrew Prendeville and Joey Scarallo who was replaced by J. R. Hildebrand for the last three races of the season. The Indy Lights team was in partnership with Rahal Letterman Racing. Hildebrand joined the team full-time in 2008 and the second car was shared by Prendeville who left the team mid-season and Daniel Herrington who stepped in to replace him. Hildebrand captured the team's first Indy Lights win at Kansas Speedway and finished 5th in points. The team also won the 2008 Star Mazda Team Championship.

Mario Romancini drove the team's primary car full-time in 2009 and won two races on his way to 6th in the championship. The team also fielded up to two additional cars for four more drivers on a part-time basis. They fielded three cars (for Conor Daly, Joel Miller, and Richard Kent) in Star Mazda that won three races and finished 3rd, 5th, and 7th in the drivers championship respectively.

The team was unable to field a car full-time in 2010 as the team's initial full-time driver Spaniard Carmen Jordá suffered from a lack of funding and other drivers had to be drafted into the car on a race-by-race basis. Seven different drivers took the wheel of Andersen's Indy Lights cars in 2010. Andersen driver Anders Krohn placed second in the 2010 Star Mazda Championship season and the team's four drivers combined to win a second team championship for Andersen. The team shut down operations in Indy Lights and Star Mazda prior to the 2011 season for financial reasons as well as for Andersen to focus on his revived U.S. F2000 National Championship series that he promotes, and in 2013 took over the Pro Mazda Championship.

The team owns and operates the Andersen Racepark karting facility at their headquarters in Palmetto, Florida.

== Motorsports results ==
(key) (Races in bold indicate pole position) (Races in italics indicate fastest lap)

=== Complete USF2000 results ===
USF2000
Year	Nr.	Driver	1	2	3	4	5	6	7	8	9	10	11	12	13	14	15	16	Pos	Points
1998	12	(United States) Mike Andersen	(United States); WDW	(United States); PIR	(United States); HMS1	(United States); HMS2	(United States); WGI	(United States); WGI	(United States); MOH1	(United States); MIN	(United States); CHA1	(United States); CHA2	(United States); MOH2; 12	(United States); ATL	(United States); PPI	(United States); PPI			-	0
2000	11	(United States) Mike Andersen	(United States); PIR	(Canada); MOS1	(Canada); MOS2	(United States); IRP1	(United States); ROA1	(United States); ROA1	(Canada); TRR	(Canada); MOS3	(United States); WGI1; 7	(United States); WGI2; 3	(United States); IRP2	(United States); ATL1	(United States); ATL1				-	0
2001	9	(United States) Mike Andersen	(United States); HMS1	(United States); HMS2	(United States); HMS3	(United States); WGI1; 24	(United States); WGI2; 4	(United States); IRP	(United States); MOH1	(United States); MOH2	(United States); ROA1	(United States); ROA2	(United States); MOH3	(United States); SEB1	(United States); SEB2				-	0
2003	24	(United States) Doug Prendeville	(United States); SEB1; 24	(United States); SEB2; 16	(United States); LRP1; 12	(United States); LRP1; Ret	(United States); MOH1; 16	(United States); MOH2; 8	(United States); ROA1; 26	(United States); ROA2; 6	(United States); MOH3; 11	(United States); MOH4; 7	(United States); ATL1; 9	(United States); ATL2; 25					13th	85
2003	25	(United States) Andrew Prendeville	(United States); SEB1; 12	(United States); SEB2; 5	(United States); LRP1; 4	(United States); LRP1; 4	(United States); MOH1; 4	(United States); MOH2; 23	(United States); ROA1; 7	(United States); ROA2; 5	(United States); MOH3; 6	(United States); MOH4; 25	(United States); ATL1; 6	(United States); ATL2; 5					5th	161
2003	28	(United States) Robbie Pecorari	(United States); SEB1	(United States); SEB2	(United States); LRP1	(United States); LRP1	(United States); MOH1	(United States); MOH2	(United States); ROA1	(United States); ROA2	(United States); MOH3	(United States); MOH4	(United States); ATL1; 23	(United States); ATL2; 23					-	0
2003	28	(United States) Adam Pecorari	(United States); SEB1	(United States); SEB2	(United States); LRP1; 8	(United States); LRP1; 7	(United States); MOH1; 9	(United States); MOH2; 9	(United States); ROA1; 4	(United States); ROA2; 28	(United States); MOH3; 24	(United States); MOH4; 2	(United States); ATL1; 4	(United States); ATL2; 21					8th	134
2004	9	(United States) Mike Andersen	(United States); SEB1	(United States); SEB2	(United States); ATL1; 4	(United States); ATL2; 17													22nd	23
2004	9	(United States) Robbie Pecorari					(United States); LS1; 5	(United States); LS2; 8	(Canada); MOS1	(Canada); MOS2	(United States); MOH1	(United States); MOH2	(United States); SON1	(United States); SON2	(United States); MOH3	(United States); MOH4	(United States); ROA1	(United States); ROA2	-	0
2004	24	(United States) Doug Prendeville	(United States); SEB1; 6	(United States); SEB2; 5	(United States); ATL1	(United States); ATL2	(United States); LS1	(United States); LS2	(Canada); MOS1	(Canada); MOS2	(United States); MOH1	(United States); MOH2	(United States); SON1	(United States); SON2	(United States); MOH3	(United States); MOH4	(United States); ROA1	(United States); ROA2	-	0
2004	25	(United States) Andrew Prendeville	(United States); SEB1; 14	(United States); SEB2; 1	(United States); ATL1; 2	(United States); ATL2; 2	(United States); LS1; 3	(United States); LS2; 4	(Canada); MOS1; 1	(Canada); MOS2; 2	(United States); MOH1; 1	(United States); MOH2; 2	(United States); SON1; 2	(United States); SON2; 4	(United States); MOH3; 5	(United States); MOH4; 4	(United States); ROA1; 33	(United States); ROA2; 8	2nd	317
2004	28	(United States) Adam Pecorari	(United States); SEB1; 2	(United States); SEB2; 4	(United States); ATL1; 16	(United States); ATL2; 7	(United States); LS1; 10	(United States); LS2; 7	(Canada); MOS1; 2	(Canada); MOS2; 4	(United States); MOH1; 17	(United States); MOH2; 1	(United States); SON1; 4	(United States); SON2; 5	(United States); MOH3; 1	(United States); MOH4; 1	(United States); ROA1; 1	(United States); ROA2; 4	3rd	308

=== Complete Formula SCCA results ===
Formula SCCA
Year	No.	Drivers	1	2	3	4	5	6	7	8	Pos.	Pts
2004	26	(United States) Jonathan Klein	(United States); SEB; 12	(United States); SEB; 11	(United States); ATL; 10	(United States); ATL; 4	(Canada); MOS	(Canada); MOS	(United States); LRP	(United States); LRP	11th	32
2004	77	(United States) Daniel Abbale	(United States); SEB; 14	(United States); SEB; 6	(United States); ATL; 11	(United States); ATL; 7	(Canada); MOS	(Canada); MOS	(United States); LRP; 10	(United States); LRP; 6	9th	57
2004	79	(United States) Chris Meredith	(United States); SEB; 3	(United States); SEB; 5	(United States); ATL; 8	(United States); ATL; 5	(Canada); MOS; DNS	(Canada); MOS	(United States); LRP	(United States); LRP	7th	69

=== Complete Star Mazda results ===
Star Mazda
Year	No.	Drivers	1	2	3	4	5	6	7	8	9	10	11	12	13	Pos.	Pts
2004	97	(United States) Jonathan Klein	(United States); SEB	(United States); MOH; 18	(United States); LRP; 4	(United States); SON; 11	(United States); POR; 18	(Canada); MOS; 5	(United States); ROA; 7	(United States); ATL; 26	(United States); PIR; DSQ	(United States); LAG; 6				15th	201
2004	98	(United States) Mike Andersen	(United States); SEB	(United States); MOH; 37	(United States); LRP; 7	(United States); SON	(United States); POR	(Canada); MOS	(United States); ROA; 16							34th	53
2004	98	(United States) Robbie Pecorari								(United States); ATL; 4	(United States); PIR	(United States); LAG; 38				34th	53
2005	12	(United States) Graham Rahal	(United States); SEB; 3	(United States); ATL1; 9	(United States); MOH; 10	(United States); MON; 2	(United States); PPR; 2	(United States); SON1; 31	(United States); SON2; 17	(United States); POR; 1	(United States); ROA; 31	(Canada); MOS; 5	(United States); ATL2; 2	(United States); LAG; 3		4th	370
2005	15	(United States) Mike Andersen	(United States); SEB	(United States); ATL1	(United States); MOH; 12	(United States); MON	(United States); PPR	(United States); SON1	(United States); SON2	(United States); POR	(United States); ROA; 4	(Canada); MOS	(United States); ATL2	(United States); LAG		35th	59
2005	22	(Chile) Pablo Donoso	(United States); SEB; 39	(United States); ATL1; 18	(United States); MOH; 2	(United States); MON; 7	(United States); PPR; 7	(United States); SON1; 1	(United States); SON2; 3	(United States); POR; 6	(United States); ROA; 32	(Canada); MOS; 7	(United States); ATL2; 7	(United States); LAG; 37		9th	275
2005	23	(United States) Robbie Pecorari	(United States); SEB; 6	(United States); ATL1; 11	(United States); MOH; 3	(United States); MON; 3	(United States); PPR; 1	(United States); SON1; 5	(United States); SON2; 4	(United States); POR; 3	(United States); ROA; 2	(Canada); MOS; 2	(United States); ATL2; 1	(United States); LAG; 4		2nd	441
2005	26	(United States) Jonathan Klein	(United States); SEB; 9	(United States); ATL1; 13	(United States); MOH; 6	(United States); MON; 14	(United States); PPR; 6	(United States); SON1; 32	(United States); SON2; 39	(United States); POR; 8	(United States); ROA; 29	(Canada); MOS; 30	(United States); ATL2; 8	(United States); LAG; 2		13th	237
2006	2	(United States) Brad Jaeger	(United States); SEB; 33	(United States); HOU; 19	(United States); MOH; 12	(United States); MIL; 11	(Canada); MON; 32	(United States); MMP	(United States); POR	(Canada); TRR			(United States); ATL; 33	(United States); LAG; 35		28th	115
2006	2	(Chile) Pablo Donoso									(United States); ROA; 12	(Canada); MOS				-	0
2006	4	(United States) Charlie Hollings	(United States); SEB; 14	(United States); HOU	(United States); MOH	(United States); MIL	(Canada); MON									-	0
2006	4	(United States) Doug Prendeville						(United States); MMP; 14	(United States); POR; 12	(Canada); TRR	(United States); ROA	(Canada); MOS				-	0
2006	4	(United States) Chris Meredith											(United States); ATL; 35			-	0
2006	4	(United States) Mickey Gilbert												(United States); LAG; 18		-	0
2006	9	(United States) Gerardo Bonilla	(United States); SEB; 1	(United States); HOU; 35	(United States); MOH; 6	(United States); MIL; 12	(Canada); MON; 29	(United States); MMP; 6	(United States); POR; 6	(Canada); TRR; 18	(United States); ROA; 4	(Canada); MOS; 2	(United States); ATL2; 7	(United States); LAG; 34		6th	324
2006	22	(Chile) Ramiro Scuncio	(United States); SEB; 9	(United States); HOU; 24	(United States); MOH; 13	(United States); MIL; 19	(Canada); MON; 24	(United States); MMP; 12	(United States); POR; 21	(Canada); TRR; 7	(United States); ROA; 35	(Canada); MOS; 14	(United States); ATL	(United States); LAG		18th	212
2006	99	(United States) Phil Saville	(United States); SEB	(United States); HOU	(United States); MOH	(United States); MIL	(Canada); MON	(United States); MMP	(United States); POR	(Canada); TRR	(United States); ROA; 20	(Canada); MOS; 8	(United States); ATL; 25	(United States); LAG		-	0
2007	6	(United Kingdom) Jonny Baker	(United States); SEB; 23	(United States); HOU; 23	(United States); VIR; 9	(United States); MMP; 25	(United States); POR; 29	(United States); CLE; 14	(Canada); TOR; 9	(United States); ROA; 26	(Canada); TRR; 6	(Canada); MOS; 4	(United States); ATL; 23	(United States); LAG; 13		12th	270
2007	14	(United States) Jonathan Goring	(United States); SEB; 10	(United States); HOU; 3	(United States); VIR; 16	(United States); MMP; 3	(United States); POR; 10	(United States); CLE; 1	(Canada); TOR; 16	(United States); ROA; 24	(Canada); TRR; 20	(Canada); MOS; 7	(United States); ATL; 4	(United States); LAG; 6		5th	346
2007	22	(United States) Phil Saville	(United States); SEB; 14	(United States); HOU	(United States); VIR; 19	(United States); MMP	(United States); POR	(United States); CLE; 12	(Canada); TOR	(United States); ROA; 15	(Canada); TRR; 23	(Canada); MOS	(United States); ATL	(United States); LAG		-	0
2007	25	(Venezuela) Ricardo Vassmer	(United States); SEB; 7	(United States); HOU; DSQ	(United States); VIR; 25	(United States); MMP	(United States); POR	(United States); CLE	(Canada); TOR	(United States); ROA	(Canada); TRR	(Canada); MOS	(United States); ATL	(United States); LAG		29th	42
2007	34	(Canada) Yannick Hofman	(United States); SEB	(United States); HOU	(United States); VIR	(United States); MMP	(United States); POR	(United States); CLE	(Canada); TOR	(United States); ROA	(Canada); TRR; 5	(Canada); MOS	(United States); ATL; 25	(United States); LAG		-	0
2007	99	(United States) Mike Fitzgerald	(United States); SEB; 21	(United States); HOU	(United States); VIR	(United States); MMP	(United States); POR	(United States); CLE	(Canada); TOR	(United States); ROA	(Canada); TRR	(Canada); MOS	(United States); ATL	(United States); LAG		-	0
2008	00	(Canada) Yannick Hofman	(United States); SEB; 25	(United States); UTA	(United States); WGI	(United States); POR	(United States); POR	(United States); ROA	(Canada); TRR	(Canada); MOS	(United States); NJ1	(United States); NJ2	(United States); ATL	(United States); LAG		34th	11
2008	5	(United Kingdom) Tom Gladdis	(United States); SEB; 5	(United States); UTA; 5	(United States); WGI	(United States); POR; 1	(United States); POR; 2	(United States); ROA; 5	(Canada); TRR; 8	(Canada); MOS; 3	(United States); NJ1; 5	(United States); NJ2; 13	(United States); ATL; 8			6th	334
2008	5	(United Kingdom) Jonny Baker												(United States); LAG; 23		-	0
2008	11	(Mexico) Juliana Gonzalez	(United States); SEB; 15													28th	21
2008	11	(United Kingdom) Jonny Baker		(United States); UTA; 12	(United States); WGI; 9	(United States); POR	(United States); POR	(United States); ROA	(Canada); TRR	(Canada); MOS	(United States); NJ1	(United States); NJ2	(United States); ATL	(United States); LAG		-	0
2008	21	(Republic of Ireland) Peter Dempsey	(United States); SEB; 3	(United States); UTA; 4	(United States); WGI; 4	(United States); POR; 24	(United States); POR; 27	(United States); ROA; 1	(Canada); TRR; 1	(Canada); MOS; 1	(United States); NJ1; 3	(United States); NJ2; 1	(United States); ATL; 19	(United States); LAG; 3		3rd	398
2008	22	(United Kingdom) Charles Hall	(United States); SEB; 2													5th	342
2008	77	(United Kingdom) Charles Hall		(United States); UTA; 2	(United States); WGI; 1	(United States); POR; 29	(United States); POR; 4	(United States); ROA; 3	(Canada); TRR; 5	(Canada); MOS; 19	(United States); NJ1; 6	(United States); NJ2; 5	(United States); ATL; 22	(United States); LAG		5th	342
2008	77	(United Kingdom) Richard Kent												(United States); LAG; 1		-	0
2008	33	(Poland) Natalia Kowalska	(United States); SEB	(United States); UTA	(United States); WGI	(United States); POR	(United States); POR	(United States); ROA; 13	(Canada); TRR; 13							-	0
2008	34	(Poland) Natalia Kowalska								(Canada); MOS; 10	(United States); NJ1	(United States); NJ2	(United States); ATL	(United States); LAG		-	0
2008	31	(Finland) Valle Mäkelä	(United States); SEB	(United States); UTA	(United States); WGI	(United States); POR	(United States); POR	(United States); ROA	(Canada); TRR	(Canada); MOS	(United States); NJ1; 4	(United States); NJ2; 7	(United States); ATL; 21	(United States); LAG		-	0
2009	2	(United States) Joel Miller	(United States); SEB	(United States); VIR	(United States); MMP	(United States); NJ1	(United States); NJ2	(United States); MIL	(United States); IOW; 19ret	(United States); ILL; 8	(United States); ILL; 4	(Canada); TRR; 3	(Canada); MOS; 12	(United States); ATL; 4	(United States); LAG; 17	5th	390
2009	5	(United States) Joe D'Agostino	(United States); SEB; 7	(United States); VIR	(United States); MMP	(United States); NJ1	(United States); NJ2	(United States); WIS	(United States); IOW	(United States); ILL	(United States); ILL	(Canada); TRR	(Canada); MOS	(United States); ATL	(United States); LAG	31st	29
2009	17	(Canada) Mikaël Grenier	(United States); SEB	(United States); VIR; 8	(United States); MMP; 7	(United States); NJ1; 3	(United States); NJ2; 3	(United States); WIS; 12	(United States); IOW	(United States); ILL	(United States); ILL	(Canada); TRR; 4	(Canada); MOS	(United States); ATL	(United States); LAG	18th	189
2009	21	(Brazil) Denis Navarro	(United States); SEB; 15	(United States); VIR; 19	(United States); MMP; 8	(United States); NJ1; 19	(United States); NJ2; 9	(United States); WIS; 13	(United States); IOW; 16	(United States); ILL; 7	(United States); ILL; 11	(Canada); TRR; 10	(Canada); MOS; 10	(United States); ATL; 7	(United States); LAG; 7	11th	321
2009	22	(United States) Conor Daly	(United States); SEB; 3	(United States); VIR; 5	(United States); MMP; 24	(United States); NJ1; 1	(United States); NJ2; 8	(United States); WIS; 22	(United States); IOW; 2	(United States); ILL; 3	(United States); ILL; 5	(Canada); TRR; 14	(Canada); MOS; 2	(United States); ATL; 2	(United States); LAG; 4	3rd	416
2009	33	(United Kingdom) Richard Kent	(United States); SEB; 2	(United States); VIR	(United States); MMP; 4	(United States); NJ1; 8	(United States); NJ2; 1	(United States); WIS; 21	(United States); IOW; 18	(United States); ILL; 4	(United States); ILL; 3	(Canada); TRR; 19	(Canada); MOS; 1	(United States); ATL; 6	(United States); LAG; 6	7th	377
2010	17	(Canada) Mikaël Grenier	(United States); SEB; 4	(United States); STP; 6	(United States); LAG; 3	(United States); ORP; 2	(United States); IOW; 15	(United States); NJ1; 5	(United States); NJ2; 21	(United States); ACC; 1	(United States); ACC; 4	(Canada); TRO; 10	(United States); ROA; 16	(Canada); MOS; 6	(United States); ATL	8th	366
2010	27	(United States) Court Vernon	(United States); SEB; 21	(United States); STP; 13	(United States); LAG	(United States); ORP	(United States); IOW	(United States); NJ1	(United States); NJ2	(United States); ACC	(United States); ACC	(Canada); TRO	(United States); ROA	(Canada); MOS	(United States); ATL	22nd	64
2010	37	(United States) Dom Bastien	(United States); SEB; 15	(United States); STP	(United States); LAG	(United States); ORP	(United States); IOW	(United States); NJ1; 18	(United States); NJ2; 19	(United States); ACC; 18	(United States); ACC; 21	(Canada); TRO	(United States); ROA; 15	(Canada); MOS	(United States); ATL; 15	19th	141
2010	38	(France) Tristan Vautier	(United States); SEB; 1	(United States); STP; 9	(United States); LAG; 15	(United States); ORP; 6	(United States); IOW; 8	(United States); NJ1; 6	(United States); NJ2; 1	(United States); ACC; 23	(United States); ACC; 2	(Canada); TRO; 11	(United States); ROA; 13	(Canada); MOS; 4	(United States); ATL; 5	5th	400
2010	47	(Norway) Anders Krohn	(United States); SEB; 5	(United States); STP; 4	(United States); LAG; 2	(United States); ORP; 5	(United States); IOW; 5	(United States); NJ1; 2	(United States); NJ2; 3	(United States); ACC; 6	(United States); ACC; 3	(Canada); TRO; 4	(United States); ROA; 4	(Canada); MOS; 5	(United States); ATL; 2	2nd	460
2010	81	(United States) Nick Andries	(United States); SEB	(United States); STP; 21	(United States); LAG	(United States); ORP	(United States); IOW; 6	(United States); NJ1; 12	(United States); NJ2; 12	(United States); ACC; 9	(United States); ACC; 10	(Canada); TRO; 18	(United States); ROA; 14	(Canada); MOS; 11	(United States); ATL; 7	15th	231

=== Complete Indy Lights results ===
Indy Lights
Year	No.	Drivers	1	2	3	4	5	6	7	8	9	10	11	12	13	14	15	16	Pos.	Pts
2007	5	(United States) Andrew Prendeville	(United States); HMS; 5	(United States); STP; 13	(United States); STP; 17	(United States); INDY; 4	(United States); MIL; 20	(United States); IMS; 21	(United States); IMS; 20	(United States); IOW; 14	(United States); WGL; 10	(United States); WGL; 8	(United States); NAS; 20	(United States); MOH; 4	(United States); KTY; 17	(United States); SNM; 7	(United States); SNM; 3	(United States); CHI; 21	11th	306
2007	15	(Australia) Joey Scarallo	(United States); HMS; 21	(United States); STP; 15	(United States); STP; 9	(United States); INDY; 20	(United States); MIL; 8	(United States); IMS; 18	(United States); IMS; 13	(United States); IOW; 13	(United States); WGL; 16	(United States); WGL; 20	(United States); NAS; 18	(United States); MOH; 18	(United States); KTY; 20				18th	184
2007	15	(United States) J. R. Hildebrand														(United States); SNM; 22	(United States); SNM; 20	(United States); CHI	37th	18
2008	5	(United States) Andrew Prendeville	(United States); HMS; 6	(United States); STP; 7	(United States); STP; 20	(United States); KAN; 23	(United States); INDY; 9	(United States); MIL; 4	(United States); IOW; 12	(United States); WGL; 11	(United States); WGL; 13	(United States); NAS; 9	(United States); MOH; 9	(United States); MOH; 8					15th	247
2008	5	(United States) Daniel Herrington													(United States); KTY; 11	(United States); SNM; 7	(United States); SNM; 8	(United States); CHI; 10	20th	152
2008	15	(United States) J. R. Hildebrand	(United States); HMS; 10	(United States); STP; 5	(United States); STP; 2	(United States); KAN; 1	(United States); INDY; 24	(United States); MIL; 5	(United States); IOW; 8	(United States); WGL; 19	(United States); WGL; 9	(United States); NAS; 4	(United States); MOH; 5	(United States); MOH; 6	(United States); KTY; 18	(United States); SNM; 4	(United States); SNM; 4	(United States); CHI; 22	5th	409
2009	5	(Brazil) Mario Romancini	(United States); STP; 9	(United States); STP; 6	(United States); LBH; 24	(United States); KAN; 3	(United States); INDY; 3	(United States); MIL; 1	(United States); IOW; 4	(United States); WGL; 20	(Canada); TOR; 6	(Canada); EDM; 8	(United States); KTY; 10	(United States); MOH; 17	(United States); SNM; 9	(United States); CHI; 16	(United States); HMS; 1		6th	392
2009	6	(United Kingdom) Alistair Jackson					(United States); INDY; 19			(United States); WGL; 15									16th	172
2009	6	(Chile) Pablo Donoso											(United States); KTY; 16						19th	147
2009	9	(United States) Jonathan Summerton	(United States); STP; 2	(United States); STP; 4	(United States); LBH; 4	(United States); KAN; 7	(United States); INDY; 12	(United States); MIL; 16											17th	162
2009	9	(Chile) Pablo Donoso							(United States); IOW; 12	(United States); WGL; 8									19th	147
2009	9	(United Kingdom) Alistair Jackson									(Canada); TOR; 11	(Canada); EDM; 15	(United States); KTY; 14	(United States); MOH; 16	(United States); SNM; 15				16th	172
2009	9	(United States) Sean Guthrie															(United States); HMS; 11		27th	65
2010	4	(Spain) Carmen Jordá	(United States); STP; 11	(United States); BAR; 17	(United States); LBH; 10				(Canada); TOR; 15	(Canada); EDM; 13									16th	84
2010	4	(Netherlands) Arie Luyendyk Jr.				(United States); INDY; 14	(United States); IOW												17th	82
2010	4	(Norway) Anders Krohn						(United States); WGL; 10											29th	20
2010	4	(Brazil) Giancarlo Vilarinho									(United States); MOH; 13	(United States); SNM; 10	(United States); CHI	(United States); KTY					27th	37
2010	4	(United States) Sean Guthrie													(United States); HMS; 10				30th	20
2010	5	(United States) Joel Miller			(United States); LBH; 11														16th	84
2010	5	(Estonia) Tõnis Kasemets							(Canada); TOR; 6										23rd	41
