= Pablo Donoso =

Chilean former professional racing driver

Pablo Donoso Prado
- Nationality: (Chile) Chilean
- Born: December 3, 1984 (age 41) Santiago de Chile

Firestone Indy Lights Series
- Years active: 2008-2009
- Teams: SWE Racing; Team Moore Racing; Brian Stewart Racing; Genoa Racing; Team PBIR; RLR-Andersen Racing
- Starts: 25
- Wins: 1
- Poles: 1
- Best finish: 7th in 2008

Previous series
- 2006-2007 2005 2004 2003 2002: USAC Silver Crown; Star Mazda Series; World Series by Nissan; World Series Light by Nissan; Argentine Formula Renault

Pablo Donoso Prado (born December 3, 1984) is a Chilean former professional racing driver. He began racing at nine years of age. He raced in the Firestone Indy Lights Series and passed the Rookie Test for the Indy Racing League IndyCar Series on February 29, 2008 at Homestead-Miami Speedway.

== Career ==
In 1994, Donoso began his racing career, in karting, moved by his father, Jorge Donoso, who was also a race driver in Chile.

Since that year and until 1999, Donoso raced karting in the Chilean and Argentine championships with a total of eighteen wins and 32 podiums, with two sub-championships and the 1996 title.

== Development in Argentina ==
Donoso moved to Argentina where he raced in the prestigious Fórmula Renault until 2002. In 2002, he became the second Chilean driver to win a race in Argentina after Eliseo Salazar who won in the 1978 Formula 4. That year, his results took him to the fight for the championship against the Argentine Juan Cruz Álvarez up to the final round, finally with a second place overall.

== Europe ==
Donoso then moved to Europe, racing in European Formula BMW Junior with a total of four wins, two poles, and four podiums. Again, he matched Salazar to be the second Chilean to win a European race since the Eliseo's 1980 win in the British Formula One Championship.

In 2003, Donoso raced in the World Series Light by Nissan with the Chilean beer brand Cristal as his main sponsor and backed by his manager, former race driver, Cristián Mackenna. That year, Donoso got one win at the EuroSpeedway Lausitz circuit with the Vergani Racing Team.

In 2004, Donoso moved to the World Series by Nissan. In this series, he was the teammate of Enrique Bernoldi, a former F1 driver. At this level, he didn't succeed and he was forced to leave his seat in the middle of the season due to budget issues.

== Early career in the United States ==
In 2004, Donoso finished his contract with Mackenna and got in touch with Eliseo Salazar to redirect his career to the US. Looking for a small racing series to compete in with specified equipment and lower budgets, he joined the Star Mazda Series in 2005. He raced in the series with Andersen Walko Racing, competing against drivers like Marco Andretti, Graham Rahal, Jonathan Klein and Raphael Matos among others.

Donoso won at Infineon Raceway from the pole position, his only victory of the season, with several podiums.

In a very criticized decision in his native Chile, Donoso joined the USAC Silver Crown Series for the 2006 season; one of the oldest open-wheel series in the United States. He believed that this series could be a step to finally get to a world-class category like NASCAR or the IndyCar Series. That, and additional financial problems made Silver Crown an attractive option in spite of other series like the Infiniti Pro Series or the Champ Car Atlantic Series possibly being better suited to his goals.

== USAC career ==
With new more formula style cars, Donoso joined the struggling series driving for Vance Racing owned by Johnny Vance. At the first races of 2006, he was able to show his potential but suffered from mechanical problems. The criticism in Chile was rising, meanwhile, many oval specialists congratulated him for this natural ability to handle the somewhat unusual cars.

The IndyCar team Hemelgarn Racing fielded a car for him in two rounds of the 2006 USAC Silver Crown season and Donoso delivered two second places at the Iowa Speedway and Kansas Speedway.

== IndyCar Series test and Indy Lights ride ==
With the goal of getting closer to the main series, in 2007, Donoso joined the team of the legendary A. J. Foyt, A. J. Foyt Enterprises. He raced the 2007 series with Tracy Hines as his teammate.

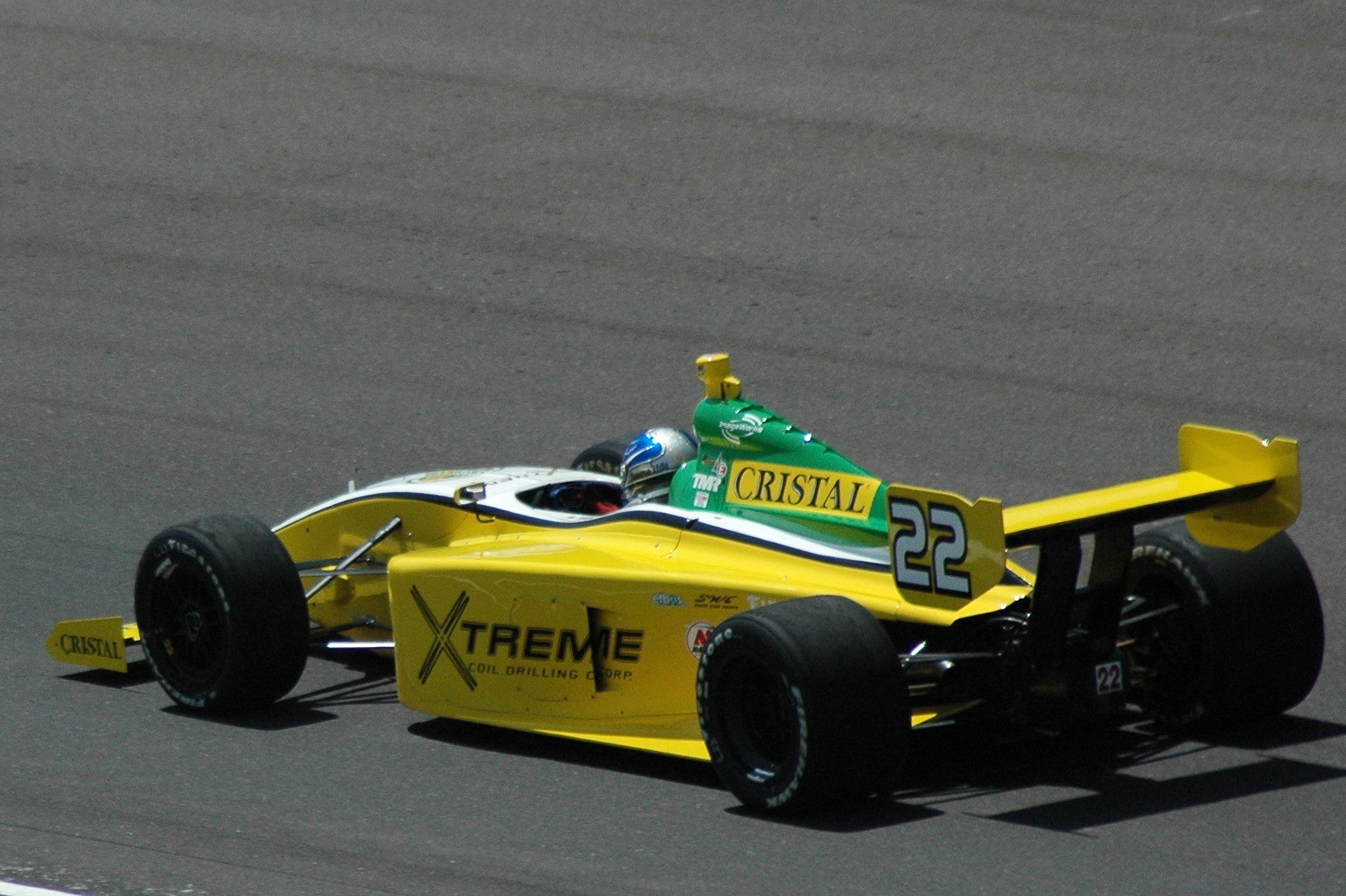
Donoso driving in the 2008 Firestone Freedom 100 for Team Moore Racing

On Friday 29th, Donoso passed the IndyCar Series rookie test at Homestead Miami Speedway using Darren Manning's car under Johnny Rutherford's supervision. After that, Foyt said that Donoso would become his second driver for the 2008 IndyCar Series season. However, he would start the season racing in the Firestone Indy Lights Series for SWE Racing, signing with the team for four races. Donoso was not entered in the Indianapolis 500 with Foyt's team, the seat instead going to Jeff Simmons. Donoso continued in Indy Lights with Team Moore Racing beginning with the Freedom 100. At the race after the Freedom 100, Donoso won his first series pole at the Milwaukee Mile.

Donoso scored his first podium finish in Indy Lights competition in the time-shortened second Mid Ohio 100 race. He finished third in a race won by James Davison. However, he parted ways with Team Moore after that race and was entered in Brian Stewart Racing's No. 3 car for the following race. He returned to Team Moore for the next pair of races at Infineon Raceway and captured his first series win in the weekend's second race as he started from the pole due to the field inversion from race 1.

Donoso signed to race in the Indy Lights in 2009 with Brian Stewart Racing. However, after the Kansas Speedway race he switched to Genoa Racing for the Freedom 100 and then Team PBIR for the Milwaukee race. He drove for his fourth team in as many races when he competed for RLR-Andersen Racing at Iowa Speedway and continued with RLR-Andersen on a part-time basis through the August race at Kentucky Speedway, which was his last start in the series.

== Racing record ==
=== Indy Lights ===
Year	Team	1	2	3	4	5	6	7	8	9	10	11	12	13	14	15	16	Rank	Points	Ref
2008	SWE Racing	HMS; 21	STP1; 14	STP2; 17	KAN; 12													8th	358	
2008	Team Moore Racing					INDY; 19	MIL; 7	IOW; 5	WGL1; 5	WGL2; 5	NSH; 10	MOH1; 10	MOH2; 3		SNM1; 8	SNM2; 1	CHI; 13	8th	358	
2008	Brian Stewart Racing													KTY; 22				8th	358	
2009	Brian Stewart Racing	STP 1; 14	STP 2; 26	LBH; 11	KAN; 19													19th	147	
2009	Genoa Racing					INDY; 9												19th	147	
2009	Team PBIR						MIL; 11											19th	147	
2009	RLR Andersen Racing							IOW; 12	WGL; 8	TOR	EDM	KTY; 16	MOH	SNM	CHI	HMS		19th	147	
