= 2004 Formula SCCA season =

The 2004 Formula SCCA season was the first season of the Formula SCCA Pro series. Elivan Goulart won the inaugural championship. After this season the series went on a five-year hiatus to return in 2010. All drivers competed in Cooper Tire shod, Mazda powered Van Diemen chassis.

== Race calendar and results ==
Round	Circuit	Location	Date	Pole position	Fastest lap	Winner
1	Sebring International Raceway	(United States) Sebring, Florida	17 March	(United States) Franklin Futrelle	(United States) Elivan Goulart	(United States) Elivan Goulart
2	Sebring International Raceway	(United States) Sebring, Florida	18 March	(United States) Elivan Goulart	(United States) Elivan Goulart	(United States) Elivan Goulart
3	Road Atlanta	(United States) Braselton, Georgia	24 April	(United States) Elivan Goulart	(United States) Elivan Goulart	(United States) Elivan Goulart
4	Road Atlanta	(United States) Braselton, Georgia	25 April	(United States) Elivan Goulart	(United States) Jonathan Klein	(United States) Franklin Futrelle
5	Mosport International Raceway	(Canada) Bowmanville, Ontario	22 May	(United States) Franklin Futrelle	(United States) Elivan Goulart	(United States) Elivan Goulart
6	Mosport International Raceway	(Canada) Bowmanville, Ontario	23 May	(United States) Elivan Goulart	(Venezuela) Enzo Potolicchio	(United States) Franklin Futrelle
7	Lime Rock Park	(United States) Lakeville, Connecticut	4 July	(United States) Elivan Goulart	(United States) Elivan Goulart	(United States) Elivan Goulart
8	Lime Rock Park	(United States) Lakeville, Connecticut	5 July	(United States) Franklin Futrelle	(United States) Franklin Futrelle	(United States) Robbie Pecorari

== Final standings ==
Color	Result
Gold	Winner
Silver	2nd place
Bronze	3rd place
Green	4th & 5th place
Light Blue	6th–10th place
Dark Blue	11th place or lower
Purple	Did not finish
Red	Did not qualify (DNQ)
Brown	Withdrawn (Wth)
Black	Disqualified (DSQ)
White	Did not start (DNS)
Blank	Did not participate (DNP)
Blank	Driver replacement (Rpl)
Blank	Injured (Inj)
Blank	No race held (NH)

Rank	Driver	(United States) SEB1	(United States) SEB2	(United States) ATL1	(United States) ATL2	(Canada) MOS1	(Canada) MOS2	(United States) LRP1	(United States) LRP2	Points
1	(United States) Elivan Goulart	1	1	1	2	1	7	1	4	214
2	(United States) Franklin Futrelle	11	2	2	1	2	1	12	2	168
3	(United States) David Jurca	2	3			3	2	3	3	133
4	(Venezuela) Enzo Potolicchio	5	4	3	3	4	4			118
5	(United States) Kristoffer Szekeres	8	8	5	8	6	3	5	10	111
6	(United States) Anthony Gigliotti	7	9	6	9	7	5	8	9	109
7	(United States) Chris Meredith	3	5	8	5	DNS				69
8	(United States) Justin Pritchard			4	6			4	8	66
9	(United States) Daniel Abbale	14	6	11	7			9	7	57
10	(United States) Keegan van Sicklen	13	7	7	11			10	6	56
11	(United States) Jonathan Klein	12	11	10	4					32
12	(United States) Desiderio Sartelli	4	10							30
13	(United States) Tim Dunn	10	12							12
	(United States) Ray Dona							7	11	
	(United States) Ken Dromm	6	DNS							
	(United States) Shawn Morrison					5	6	6	DNS	
	(United States) Robbie Pecorari							2	1	
	(United States) Lee Shumosic							11	5	
	(United States) Jerry Streckert			9	10					
	(United States) David Webb	9	DNS							
