= Andrew Prendeville =

American professional automobile racer (born 1981)

- Nationality: American
- Born: October 5, 1981 (age 45) Morristown, New Jersey, U.S.

Firestone Indy Lights Series
- Years active: 2007-2009
- Teams: RLR/Andersen Racing; Team Moore Racing
- Starts: 43
- Wins: 0
- Poles: 0
- Fastest laps: 0
- Best finish: 9th in 2009

Previous series
- 2006 2003-2004: Star Mazda; U.S. F2000

Andrew Prendeville (born October 5, 1981) is an American professional automobile racer.

In 2004, Prendeville took second place in the Cooper Tires Formula Ford 2000 national championship. In 2002, at the Valvoline Runoffs, he won the SCCA Formula Continental national championship, sharing the position as SCCA's Rookie of the Year.

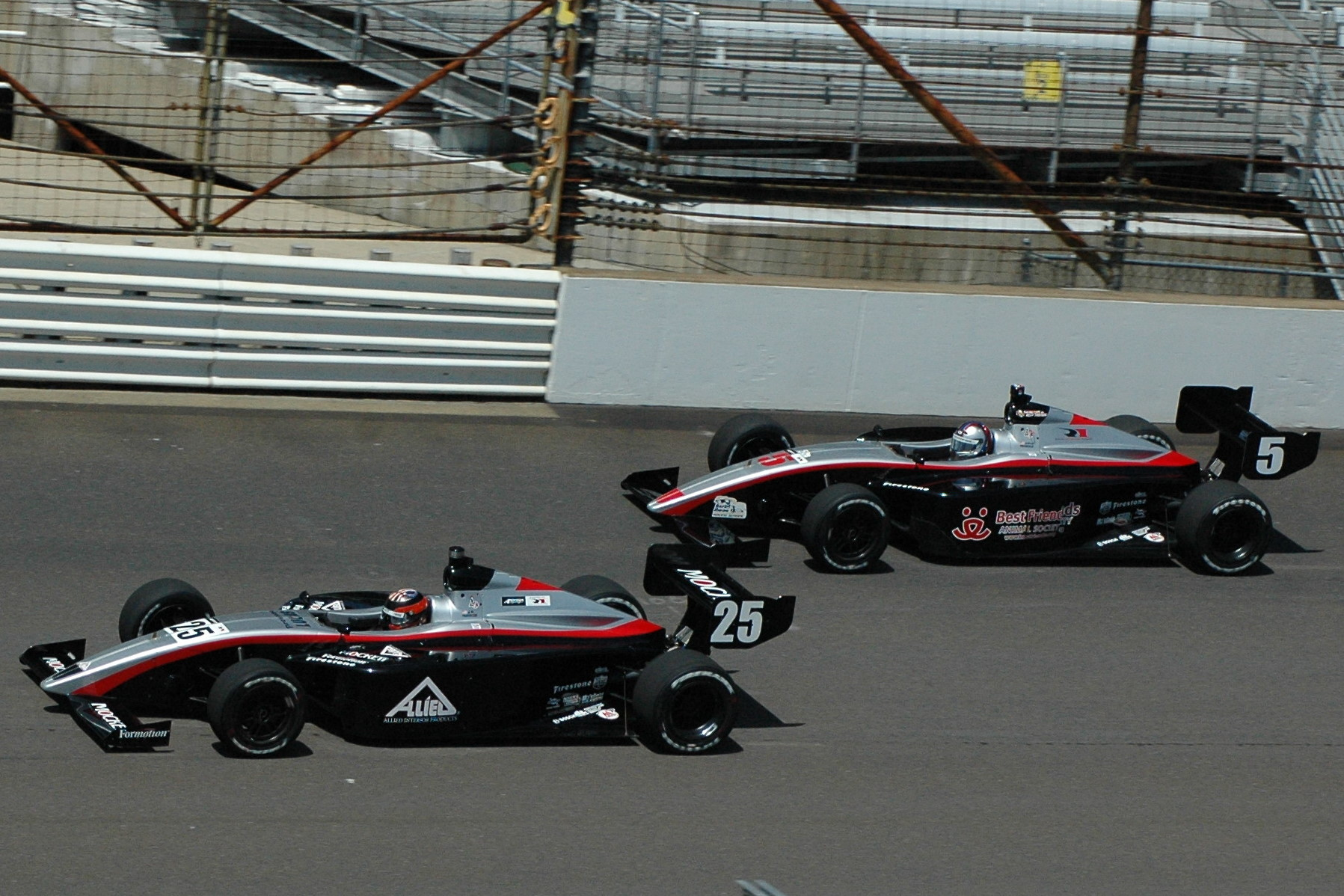
Prendeville (outside) races alongside teammate J. R. Hildebrand in the 2008 Firestone Freedom 100

Based in Las Vegas, Prendeville raced in the Indy Pro Series for Andersen Racing from the start of the 2007 season until the middle of the 2008 season. Until departing to "pursue other opportunities", Prendeville drove car No. 5, with signage dedicated to Best Friends Animal Society. In 2007, in coordination with the no-kill animal sanctuary, Prendeville launched "Racing Laps for Best Friends", a fundraising initiative that included a website for donation and promotional appearances. In July 2007, Prendeville was named an honorary citizen of Indianapolis in response to his fundraising efforts. He was replaced in car No. 5 by Daniel Herrington. He returned to the series for 2009, driving for Team Moore Racing. He finished a career-best ninth in points with a best finish of third at Chicagoland Speedway.

A resident of Chatham Township, New Jersey, Prendeville, who graduated from Chatham High School in 2000, is the younger brother of Doug Prendeville, who is also a professional driver.

== Racing results ==
=== Indy Lights ===
Year	Team	1	2	3	4	5	6	7	8	9	10	11	12	13	14	15	16	Rank	Points
2007	RLR Andersen Racing	HMS; 5	STP1; 13	STP2; 17	INDY; 4	MIL; 20	IMS1; 21	IMS2; 20	IOW; 14	WGL1; 10	WGL2; 8	NSH; 20	MOH; 4	KTY; 17	SNM1; 7	SNM2; 3	CHI; 21	11th	306
2008	RLR Andersen Racing	HMS; 6	STP1; 7	STP2; 20	KAN; 23	INDY; 9	MIL; 4	IOW; 12	WGL1; 11	WGL2; 13	NSH; 9	MOH1; 9	MOH2; 8	KTY	SNM1	SNM2	CHI	15th	247
2009	Team Moore Racing	STP1; 17	STP2; 15	LBH; 16	KAN; 9	INDY; 15	MIL; 8	IOW; 11	WGL; 13	TOR; 10	EDM; 7	KTY; 5	MOH; 7	SNM; 13	CHI; 3	HMS; 10		9th	313
