= Joey Scarallo =

Australian racing driver

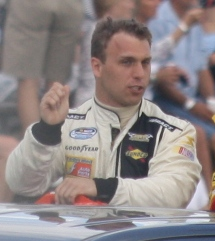
- Scarallo at 2010 Nationwide Road America race
- Born: 29 November 1978 (age 47) (South Australia) Adelaide, Australia

NASCAR O'Reilly Auto Parts Series career
- 2 races run over 1 year
- Best finish: 141st (2010)
- First race: 2010 Bucyrus 200 (Road America)
- Last race: 2010 Zippo 200 at the Glen (Watkins Glen)
Wins	Top tens	Poles
0	0	0

Joey Scarallo (born 29 November 1978 in Adelaide, Australia) is a professional racing driver. At the age of three his family moved to Long Island, New York, where he currently still lives.

Scarallo started karting at age eleven, winning multiple championships. It was around this time that he graduated from the Jim Hall Kart School. When he was thirteen years old, he was diagnosed with a brain tumor and had to put his racing aspirations on hold. After undergoing brain surgery he became a two-time national karting champion, winning two Duffy trophies, in the International Karting Federation (IKF.)

== Open-wheel racing ==
After being emancipated as a minor, Scarallo started his car racing career in the open-wheel ranks in the US Formula Ford 2000 Championship Series in 1996. The first race was at the newly built Walt Disney World Speedway in a family owned 1995 Van Diemen. After a surprise outside pole qualifying position, he led the first nine laps of the race. Chris Economaki of Speed Sport News dubbed Scarallo the next Jeff Gordon.

Scarallo ran in the USFF2000 Series in 1996, a part of 1997, and in 1998. In 2000, he ran six races in the Toyota Atlantic Championship before making the jump to race in the Trans-Am Series in 2001. In 2007, he made the switch back to open wheel racing for one year, racing in the Indy Lights Series for a startup team.

== Stock car racing ==
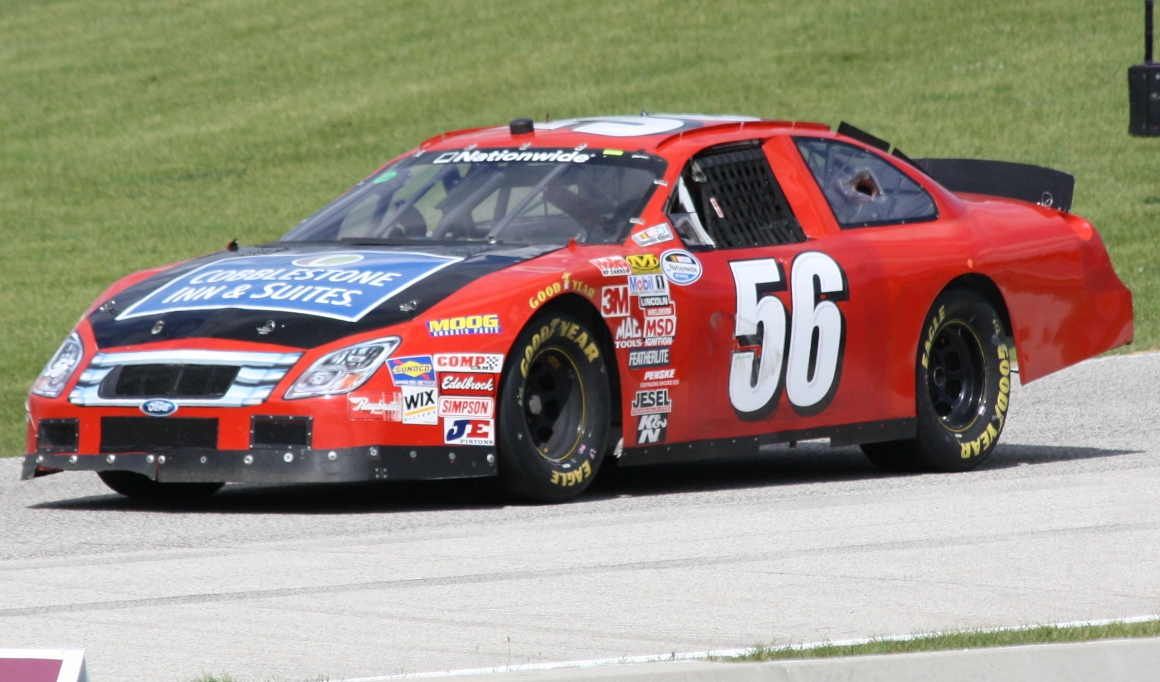
Nationwide car at 2010 Road America race

It wasn't until 2002 that Scarallo joined the North American Trans-Am Championship. In February of that year, Scarallo was invited to drive for K&N Air Filters in a company development car, in the 24 Hours of Daytona. The car was an Ultima GTR. After breaking many times throughout the race, the car was finally retired during the night portion of the race. In 2004, Scarallo was hired to race in the 3-Hour Endurance race of Puerto Rico with teammate Jorge Diaz, another Trans-Am competitor. After qualifying on pole and leading every lap of the race Scarallo, became the very first American to win the event. 2005 was a very competitive year with many laps led, and a fifth place championship finish. The Trans-Am Championship went on hiatus after 2006 and Scarallo moved over to run in the SCCA World Challenge in the GT class with a Pontiac GTO.

In 2010, Scarallo made his NASCAR debut in the Nationwide Series when he was hired by a team to run on the Road America and Watkins Glen road courses helping them collect base prize money for qualifying and pulling out of the races early. Many lower budget NASCAR teams do this as a full-time revenue source, deriving the term "Start and Park".

== Career results ==
Season	Series	Position	Car	Team
1996	US Formula Ford 2000 Championship	20th	Van Diemen - Ford	
2000	Toyota Atlantic Championship	NC	Swift - Toyota	Condor Motorsport
2003	North American Transam	12th	Chevrolet Corvette	Baucom Motorsports
2004	North American Transam	7th	Chevrolet Corvette	Baucom Motorsports
2005	North American Transam	5th	Chevrolet Corvette	Tony Ave Racing
2007	Firestone Indy Lights	18th	Dallara	RLR Andersen Racing
2008	SCCA World Challenge - GT	16th	Chevrolet Corvette	Tony Ave Racing
2009	SCCA World Challenge - GT	20th	Pontiac GTO	Group A Racing
2010	North American Transam	23rd	Chevrolet Corvette	Group A Racing
2010	NASCAR Nationwide Series	141st	Ford	Means Racing

=== Indy Lights ===
Year	Team	1	2	3	4	5	6	7	8	9	10	11	12	13	14	15	16	Rank	Points	Ref
2007	RLR Andersen Racing	HMS; 21	STP1; 15	STP2; 9	INDY; 20	MIL; 8	IMS1; 18	IMS2; 13	IOW; 13	WGL1; 13	WGL2; 20	NSH; 18	MOH; 18	KTY; 20	SNM1	SNM2	CHI	**18th**	**184**	

=== NASCAR ===
(key) (Bold – Pole position awarded by qualifying time. Italics – Pole position earned by points standings or practice time. * – Most laps led.)

==== Nationwide Series ====
NASCAR Nationwide Series results
Year	Team	No.	Make	1	2	3	4	5	6	7	8	9	10	11	12	13	14	15	16	17	18	19	20	21	22	23	24	25	26	27	28	29	30	31	32	33	34	35	NNSC	Pts	Ref
2010	Mac Hill Motorsports	56	Ford	DAY	CAL	LVS	BRI	NSH	PHO	TEX	TAL	RCH	DAR	DOV	CLT	NSH	KEN	ROA; 39	NHA	DAY	CHI	GTY	IRP	IOW															141st	46	
2010	Means Racing	52	Ford																						GLN; 38	MCH	BRI	CGV	ATL	RCH	DOV	KAN	CAL	CLT	GTY	TEX	PHO	HOM	141st	46	
