= Team Moore Racing =

- Owner(s): Mark Moore; Tom Wood
- Base: Pittsboro, Indiana
- Series: Firestone Indy Lights

Career
- Debut: 2007 Indy Pro Series season Miami 100
- Latest race: 2014 Indy Lights season Sonoma race 2
- Races competed: 0
- Race victories: 6
- Pole positions: 6

Team Moore Racing was an auto racing team that competed in the Firestone Indy Lights series. It was owned by former racer Tom Wood and Mark Moore and is based in Pittsboro, Indiana.

The team was formed in 2007 with Wood driving. However, after the first race of the season Wood retired and Jonathan Klein took over driving duties for the rest of the season (with Travis Gregg filing in for Klein due to injury for one race). Klein finished 12th in points, driving in 14 of the 16 races. In 2008 the team returned initially with IndyCar veteran Jeff Simmons in its primary car. The team expanded to a second car for a few races, primarily with driver Pablo Donoso who drove for several different teams that season. Donoso captured the team's first win at Infineon Raceway in August. Simmons left the team late in the season and was replaced by a returning Jonathan Klein. In 2009 the team fielded a single car for Andrew Prendeville for all 15 races. Prendeville finished 9th in points with a best finish of 3rd at Infineon Raceway. In 2010 the team expanded to two full-time cars for Canadian James Hinchcliffe and Spaniard Adrian Campos, Jr. Hinchcliffe won 3 races and 2 poles and finished runner-up in the championship to rookie Jean-Karl Vernay. Campos had a poor start to the season but improved to 6th in points by season's end on a string of six straight top-10 finishes, winning the "Most Improved Driver" award.

For the 2011 season they signed third-year driver Gustavo Yacamán to drive their #2 car and Spanish rookie Víctor García to drive the #22. García won the second race of the season at Barber Motorsports Park but left the series after the Toronto race due to funding issues involving his backers in Spain. García sat fourth in the championship at the time and was replaced for the Edmonton race by Canadian Daniel Morad. Québécois driver Mikaël Grenier drove the #22 car at Circuit Trois-Rivières and Tõnis Kasemets drove in Baltimore. Brandon Wagner drove the #22 car in association with his regular team, Davey Hamilton Racing, in the three remaining oval events. The best finish the #22 achieved after García's departure was a fourth place at Kentucky Speedway by Wagner. Gustavo Yacamán captured his first series win in Baltimore, and had three other podium finishes. He finished fourth in points, his best points result. García finished 11th in points, competing in seven of the fourteen races.

2012 saw the return of Yacamán in the #2 car for TMR. Joining the Colombian was second year Firestone Indy Lights driver David Ostella. Yacamán improved one spot over his 2011 result to finish third in points with two wins and Ostella finished in eighth with a best finish of second in the season finale at Auto Club Speedway.

In 2013 the team has signed veteran Mexican driver Juan Pablo García for the #2 car. Garcia left the team after ten races and went to Belardi Auto Racing. Peter Dempsey replaced García in Houston and the team did not participate in the season finale at Auto Club Speedway. Five different drivers competed in five races in the #22 car. Conor Daly drove the #22 to a season-best finish of third place at Houston for the team. García finished eighth in points, last among full-time drivers, with a best finish of fourth in the season-opener in St. Pete.

In 2014 Canadian Zack Meyer drove in twelve of the fourteen races in the #2 car. He had a best finish of fourth on the Indianapolis Motor Speedway road course and finished ninth in the championship. Italian Vittorio Ghirelli began the season in the #22 but left the series after four races with a best finish of fourth in the season opener at St. Pete. American Jimmy Simpson drove the #22 in the Mid-Ohio Sports Car Course double-header.

Team Moore announced that they had signed Mexican driver Picho Toledano to a part-time schedule for the 2015 season. However, the entry never materialized and Team Moore shut down in the mid-summer of 2015.

== Complete Racing Results ==
=== Infiniti Pro Series/Indy Pro Series/Indy Lights ===
(key)

Indy Lights results
Year	Chassis	Engine	Drivers	No.	1	2	3	4	5	6	7	8	9	10	11	12	13	14	15	16	Points		Position	
2007					HMS	STP		INDY	MIL	IMS		IOW	WGL		NSH	MOH	KTY	SNM		CHI	D.C.	T.C.	D.C.	T.C.
2007	Dallara	Nissan VRH	(Canada) Tom Wood	2	17																13	—	38th	—
2007	Dallara	Nissan VRH	(United States) Jonathan Klein	2		3	14	10	3	19	7	18	11	9	4	19		9	6	15	304	—	12th	—
2007	Dallara	Nissan VRH	(United States) Travis Gregg	2													10			16	34	—	32nd	—
2008					HMS	STP		KAN	INDY	MIL	IOW	WGL		NAS	MOH		KTY	SNM		CHI	D.C.	T.C.	D.C.	T.C.
2008	Dallara	Nissan VRH	(United States) Jeff Simmons	2		4	19	7	8	2	6	3	6	15	6	21	23				285	—	13th	—
2008	Dallara	Nissan VRH	(United States) Jonathan Klein	2														16	10	6	86	—	27th	—
2008	Dallara	Nissan VRH	(United States) Jonathan Klein	22													8				86	—	27th	—
2008	Dallara	Nissan VRH	(Chile) Pablo Donoso (R)	22					19	7	5	5	5	10	10	3		8	1		358	—	8th	—
2008	Dallara	Nissan VRH	(United Kingdom) Dillon Battistini (R)	22																23	385	—	6th	—
2009					STP		LBH	KAN	INDY	MIL	IOW	WGL	TOR	EDM	KTY	MOH	SNM	CHI	HMS		D.C.	T.C.	D.C.	T.C.
2009	Dallara	Nissan VRH	(United States) Andrew Prendeville	2	17	15	16	9	15	8	11	13	10	7	5	7	13	3	10		313	—	9th	—
2010					STP	ALA	LBH	INDY	IOW	WGL	TOR	EDM	MOH	SNM	CHI	KTY	HMS				D.C.	T.C.	D.C.	T.C.
2010	Dallara	Nissan VRH	(Canada) James Hinchcliffe	2	15	5	1*	3	5	2*	10	1*	7	3	1	2	2				471	—	2nd	—
2010	Dallara	Nissan VRH	(Spain) Adrián Campos Jr. (R)	22	16	13	15	10	4	7	13	8	6	7	8	4	4				307	—	6th	—
2011					STP	ALA	LBH	INDY	MIL	IOW	TOR	EDM		TRO	NHA	BAL	KTY	LSV			D.C.	T.C.	D.C.	T.C.
2011	Dallara	Nissan VRH	(Colombia) Gustavo Yacamán	2	14	12	4	15	5	2	3	5	16	2	4	1	11	5			401	—	4th	—
2011	Dallara	Nissan VRH	(Spain) Víctor García (R)	22	15	1*	12	3	10	4	7										199	—	11th	—
2011	Dallara	Nissan VRH	(Canada) Daniel Morad (R)	22								15	11								34	—	26th	—
2011	Dallara	Nissan VRH	(Canada) Mikaël Grenier (R)	22										11							121	—	16th	—
2011	Dallara	Nissan VRH	(United States) Brandon Wagner	22											9		4	6			134	—	15th	—
2011	Dallara	Nissan VRH	(Estonia) Tõnis Kasemets (R)	22												8					24	—	27th	—
2012					STP	ALA	LBH	INDY	DET	MIL	IOW	TOR	EDM	TRO	BAL	FON					D.C.	T.C.	D.C.	T.C.
2012	Dallara	Nissan VRH	(Colombia) Gustavo Yacamán	2	6	4	10	4	1	8	2	1*	7	2	2	11					394	—	3rd	—
2012	Dallara	Nissan VRH	(Canada) David Ostella	22	15	9	8	18	13	4	5	7	10	6	4	2					298	—	8th	—
2013					STP	ALA	LBH	INDY	MIL	IOW	POC	TOR	MOH	BAL	HOU	FON					D.C.	T.C.	D.C.	T.C.
2013	Dallara	Nissan VRH	(Mexico) Juan Pablo García	2	4	8	6	9	5	6	6	5	6	DNS							312	—	8th	—
2013	Dallara	Nissan VRH	(Republic of Ireland) Peter Dempsey	2											9						360	—	5th	—
2013	Dallara	Nissan VRH	(United States) Ethan Ringel (R)	22	9																22	—	18th	—
2013	Dallara	Nissan VRH	(Brazil) Victor Carbone	22		7															26	—	14th	—
2013	Dallara	Nissan VRH	(Canada) Mikaël Grenier	22			7														26	—	15th	—
2013	Dallara	Nissan VRH	(United States) Jimmy Simpson (R)	22				7													26	—	16th	—
2013	Dallara	Nissan VRH	(United States) Conor Daly	22											3						35	—	13th	—
2014					STP	LBH	ALA		IMS		INDY	POC	TOR	MOH		MIL	SNM				D.C.	T.C.	D.C.	T.C.
2014	Dallara	Nissan VRH	(Canada) Zack Meyer (R)	2	8	10	9	8	4	10	10		10	7	10		9	8			274	111	9th	5th
2014	Dallara	Nissan VRH	(Italy) Vittorio Ghirelli (R)	22	4	12	8	11													90	111	13th	5th
2014	Dallara	Nissan VRH	(United States) Jimmy Simpson	22										11	8						42	111	15th	5th
