= Logan Gomez =

American racing driver

- Nationality: (United States) American
- Born: December 16, 1988 (age 37) Crown Point, Indiana, U.S.

Firestone Indy Lights Series
- Years active: 2006-2009
- Teams: Sam Schmidt Motorsports; Guthrie Racing; Alliance Motorsports
- Starts: 36
- Wins: 1
- Poles: 0
- Best finish: 7th in Championship in 2007 & 2008

Previous series
- 2006: Star Mazda

Logan Gomez (born December 16, 1988) is an American former race car driver from Crown Point, Indiana who most notably competed in the Firestone Indy Lights Series (formerly the Indy Pro Series).

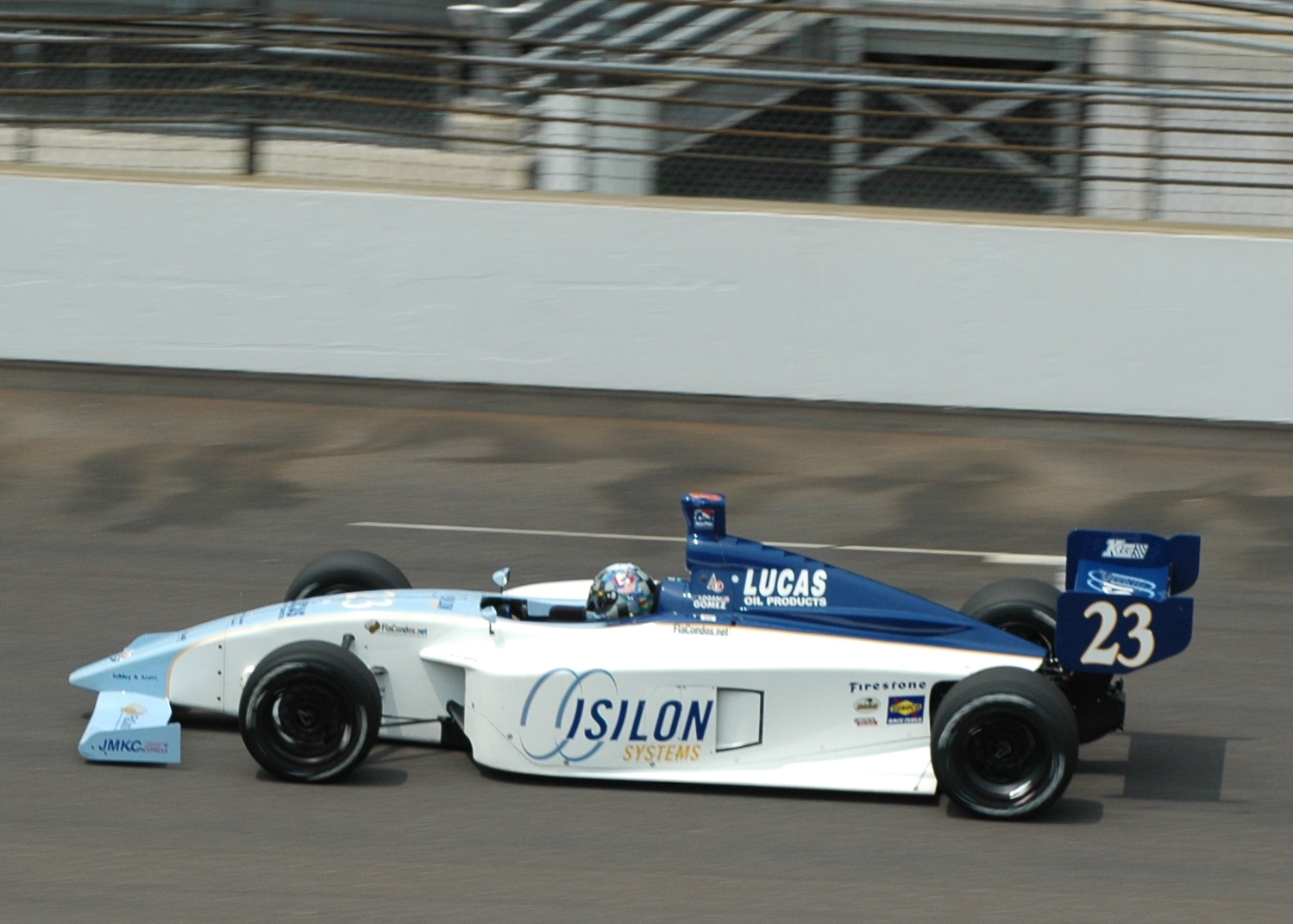
Gomez racing in the 2007 Freedom 100

Gomez made his debut at the 2006 Liberty Challenge at the Indianapolis Motor Speedway road course while competing in the Star Mazda series full-time. He moved full-time to the Indy Pro Series in 2007 by bringing iSilon Systems backing to fund a ride at Sam Schmidt Motorsports. Gomez finished seventh in points and captured one win in the final race of the season at Chicagoland Speedway by a mere 0.0005 seconds over teammate and series champion Alex Lloyd, a margin which the league claims is the smallest margin of victory in racing history. He returned to Guthrie Racing, the team that he made his debut with in 2006 for the 2008 season, finishing seventh in points with a best finish of second in the second race at Infineon Raceway. For the 2009 Indy Lights season, he ran the first two races of the season (the St. Pete double-header) for Alliance Motorsports but the team did not arrive at the second race weekend in Long Beach.

== Indy Lights ==
Year	Team	1	2	3	4	5	6	7	8	9	10	11	12	13	14	15	16	Rank	Points
2006	Guthrie Racing	HMS	STP1	STP2	INDY	WGL	IMS; 10	NSH	MIL	KTY	SNM1	SNM2	CHI					35th	20
2007	Sam Schmidt Motorsports	HMS; 16	STP1; 14	STP2; 18	INDY; 12	MIL; 18	IMS1; 9	IMS2; 6	IOW; 6	WGL1; 14	WGL2; 15	NSH; 2	MOH; 10	KTY; 13	SNM1; 6	SNM2; 4	CHI; 1	7th	368
2008	Guthrie Racing	HMS; 12	STP1; 23	STP2; 3	KAN; 15	INDY; 7	MIL; 9	IOW; 14	WGL1; 6	WGL2; 4	NSH; 6	MOH1; 20	MOH2; 16	KTY; 12	SNM1; 5	SNM2; 2	CHI; 8	7th	361
2009	Alliance Motorsports	STP 1; 24	STP 2; 25	LBH	KAN	INDY	MIL	IOW	WGL	TOR	EDM	KTY	MOH	SNM	CHI			28th	33
2009	Sam Schmidt Motorsports															HMS; 9		28th	33
