= Anders Krohn =

Norwegian racing driver (born 1987)

- Nationality: (Norway) Norwegian
- Born: 15 November 1987 (age 38) Stavanger

Firestone Indy Lights Series career
- Debut season: 2010
- Current team: Bryan Herta Autosport
- Car number: 28
- Former teams: Andersen Racing; Belardi Auto Racing
- Starts: 17
- Wins: 0
- Poles: 0
- Fastest laps: 0
- Best finish: 7th in 2011

Previous series
- 2009–10 2008 2007: Star Mazda Championship; F2000 Championship Series; Formula Ford

Championship titles
- 2008: F2000 Championship Series

Anders Krohn (born 15 November 1987) is a Norwegian racing driver from Stavanger.

== Racing career ==
After a youth in karting, Krohn moved to cars in the Swedish Junior Touring Car Championship in 2006. In 2007, he primarily raced in Benelux Formula Ford series but made a few appearances in other Formula Ford series and participated in the Formula Ford Festival, finishing eleventh in Duratec class. In 2008, he moved to the United States and competed in the F2000 Championship Series for Andersen Racing where he won the championship. In 2009, he competed for Mundill in the Star Mazda Championship, winning at the Milwaukee Mile and finishing sixth in points. For the 2010 season, he stayed in Star Mazda but returned to Andersen Racing. He made his Firestone Indy Lights debut for Andersen Racing on July 4 at Watkins Glen International. He finished second in Star Mazda points despite not winning a race thanks to finishing sixth or better in every race. He raced full-time in Firestone Indy Lights in 2011 for Belardi Auto Racing in the team's first season in Indy Lights. He finished seventh in points with a best finish of fifth (twice). In 2012, he made two Indy Lights starts (including the Freedom 100) for Bryan Herta Autosport. He finished twentieth in points.

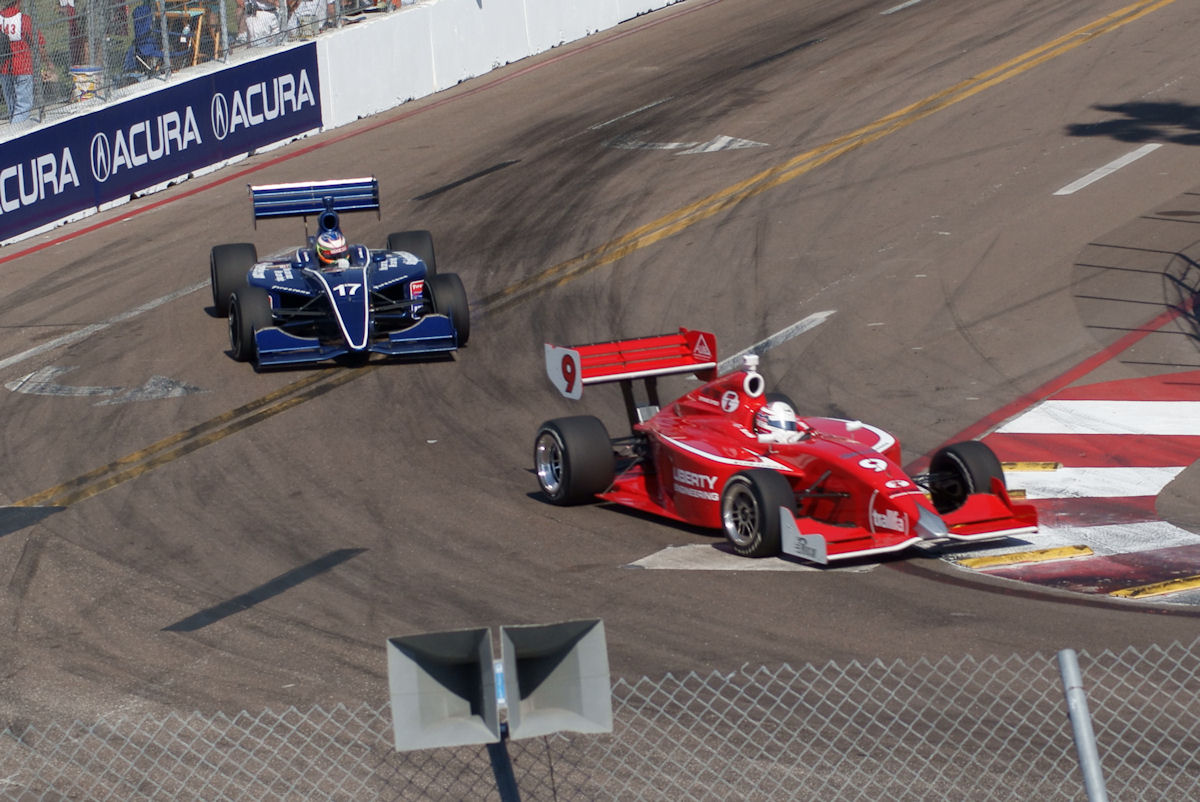
Krohn (red car) driving in Indy Lights for Belardi Auto Racing at St. Petersburg in 2011

== Announcing ==
In 2017, Krohn announced he had accepted a role with NBCSN doing reports and interviews trackside at IndyCar events. As from 2019 he is also a contributor in the Viasat Motor F1 pod focusing on the Indy Car section of the show.

== Personal life ==
Krohn currently resides in Houston, Texas. Since he began racing in the United States, he has earned the nickname "The Viking" due to his Norwegian heritage.

== Racing record ==
=== American open–wheel racing results ===
(key)

==== Star Mazda Championship / Pro Mazda Championship ====
Year	Team	1	2	3	4	5	6	7	8	9	10	11	12	13	14	Rank	Points
2009	Mundill	SEB; 17	VIR; 6	MMP; 12	NJ1; 12	NJ2; 6	WIS; 1	IOW; 6	ILL; 10	ILL; 12	QUE; 6	ONT; 5	ATL; 9	LAG; 3		6th	380
2010	Andersen Racing	SEB; 5	STP; 4	LAG; 2	ORP; 5	IOW; 5	NJ1; 2	NJ2; 3	ACC; 6	ACC; 3	TRO; 4	ROA; 4	MOS; 5	ATL; 2		2nd	460
2014	Team Pelfrey	STP	STP	BAR	BAR	IMS	IMS	LOR; 5	HOU	HOU	MOH	MOH	MIL	SON	SON	25th	17

==== Indy Lights ====
Year	Team	1	2	3	4	5	6	7	8	9	10	11	12	13	14	Rank	Points	Ref
2010	Andersen Racing	STP	ALA	LBH	INDY	IOW	WGL; 10	TOR	EDM	MOH	SNM	CHI	KTY	HMS		29th	20	
2011	Belardi Auto Racing	STP; 5	ALA; 9	LBH; 8	INDY; 12	MIL; 9	IOW; 11	TOR; 5	EDM1; 13	EDM2; 6	TRO; 6	NHM; 11	BAL; 6	KTY; 13	LVS; 7	7th	328	
2012	Bryan Herta Autosport	STP	ALA	LBH	INDY; 19	DET	MIL	IOW; 9	TOR	EDM	TRO	BAL	FON			20th	34	
