= 2008 Indy Lights =

2008 Indy Lights season
- Firestone Indy Lights

Season
- Races: 16
- Start date: March 29
- End date: September 7

Awards
- Drivers' champion: (Brazil) Raphael Matos
- Teams' champion: (United States) Andretti Green-AFS Racing
- Rookie of the Year: (Brazil) Ana Beatriz

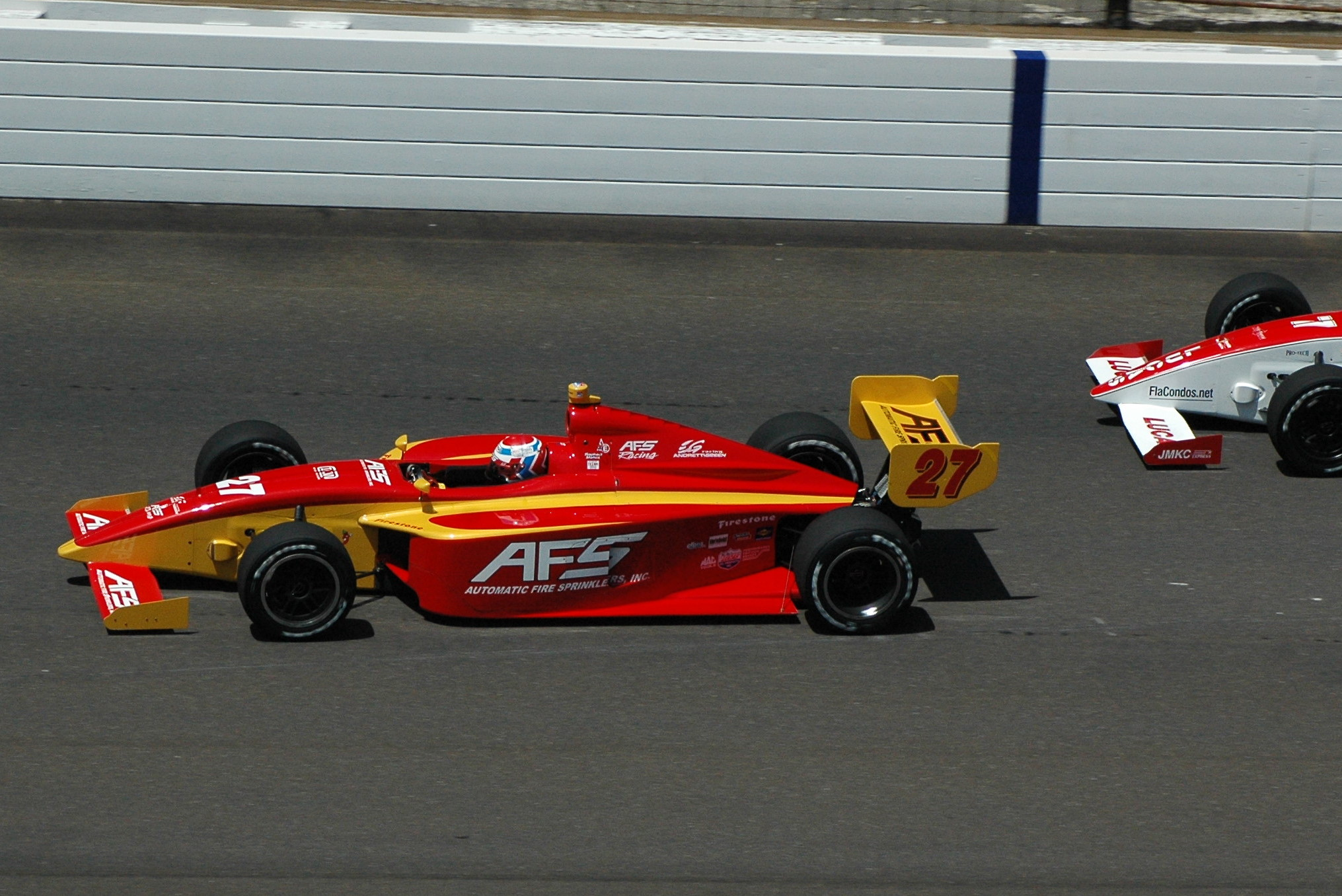
Brazilian driver Raphael Matos won the series championship.

The 2008 IRL Firestone Indy Lights Series, formerly the Indy Pro Series, was the seventh season of the developmental open-wheel racing series under the Indy Racing League ownership, and the 23rd in Indy NXT combined history.

As part of the unification with Champ Car in February 2008, all previous seasons of the Indy Pro Series from its inaugural season in 2002 were combined with the historical records of the old Indy Lights development series, which ran under CART management from 1986 to 2001. On March 22, 2008, Firestone signed on to be the title sponsor, and thus the Indy Pro Series was retitled into Firestone Indy Lights Series. The link between both series was further established within the Firestone Firehawk Cup, which was awarded to the champion between 2002 and 2013.

After passing on his scholarship for winning the Atlantic Championship before the IndyCar-Champ Car unification, Raphael Matos won the Indy Lights championship driving for Andretti Green/AFS Racing. Matos reached the finale at Chicagoland Speedway with a three point lead over Richard Antinucci, who was racing for Sam Schmidt Motorsports and lost all chances after crashing halfway through the race. Matos scored three wins against Antinucci's two, all of them on road courses, with both drivers splitting the St. Petersburg and Watkins Glen doubleheaders.

Rookie of the Year honors went to one of Antinucci's teammates, Ana Beatriz, who finished third in points and won in Nashville, becoming the first woman in history to win an Indy Lights race. She finished 21 points clear of series veteran Arie Luyendyk Jr, Matos' teammate for his first full season since 2004, who finally got his first win at the final round in Chicagoland in his 62nd attempt.

Despite his complete lack of oval background, British driver Dillon Battistini surprised by being the class of the field on this discipline for Panther Racing. He won in his first race at Homestead-Miami Speedway and at the Freedom 100, for a total of four oval wins. However, his lack of pace on the road courses and multiple issues during the year dropped Battistini to 6th in the points behind rookie J. R. Hildebrand, the winner at Kansas. Wins were also achieved by Pablo Donoso, James Davison, Bobby Wilson and demoted IndyCar driver Franck Perera for a total of 10 different winners during the season, which as of 2023 stands as the all-time Indy NXT record.

After one year with an in-house operation, Chip Ganassi Racing partnered for the 2008 season with Apex Racing, which would run the operation under the new name of Integra Motorsports with CGRT. The alliance between American Spirit Racing and Atlantic Racing Team that gave birth to Team KMA was dissolved, as American Spirit kept on running the rebranded team. Kenn Hardley Racing left the series and sold their equipment to new team Alliance Motorsports, while Team E also entered the series in place of departing teams Cheever Racing and SpeedWorks. A new venture called FuZion Autosports by former team owner Dave McMillan registered an entry for driver Adam Andretti, but neither the team or the driver made an appearance during the year, after McMillan joined Integra Motorsports as team manager.

Strong grids continued for the second year in a row, with 20 drivers at least in each round, up to 23-24 drivers at most rounds and 27 starters for the Freedom 100, which stands as the all-time record for the event. This would filter into the start of the 2009 season, right before the economic downturn in auto racing. 12 drivers contested all sixteen races, and a total of 40 drivers competed during the season.

== Drivers and teams ==
Team	No	Drivers	Rounds
(United States) Team Moore Racing	2	(United States) Jeff Simmons	2–13
(United States) Team Moore Racing	2	(United States) Jonathan Klein	14–16
(United States) Team Moore Racing	22	(Chile) Pablo Donoso	5–12, 14–15
(United States) Team Moore Racing	22	(United States) Jonathan Klein	13
(United States) Team Moore Racing	22	(United Kingdom) Dillon Battistini	16
(United States) Brian Stewart Racing	3	(Peru) Juan Manuel Polar	1–4
(United States) Brian Stewart Racing	3	(New Zealand) Marc Williams	5–6
(United States) Brian Stewart Racing	3	(Chile) Pablo Donoso	13, 16
(United States) Brian Stewart Racing	33	(New Zealand) Wade Cunningham	1, 4–6
(United States) Brian Stewart Racing	33	(New Zealand) Mitch Cunningham	2–3, 8–9, 11–12, 14–15
(United States) Guthrie Racing	4	(United States) Sean Guthrie	All
(United States) Guthrie Racing	9	(United States) Tom Wieringa	1
(United States) Guthrie Racing	23	(United States) Logan Gomez	All
(United States) Guthrie Racing	44	(United States) Robbie Pecorari	13–16
(United States) Guthrie Racing	54	(United States) Micky Gilbert	5–7, 10, 13, 16
(United States) Guthrie Racing	54	(United States) Matt Lee	8–9
(United States) Guthrie Racing	54	(United States) Robbie Pecorari	11–12
(United States) Guthrie Racing	54	(Peru) Juan Manuel Polar	14–15
(United States) Guthrie Racing	55	(United States) Robbie Pecorari	4
(United States) Guthrie Racing	55	(United States) Tom Wieringa	5, 16
(United States) Guthrie Racing	55	(France) Franck Perera	7–15
(United States) RLR Andersen Racing	5	(United States) Andrew Prendeville	1–12
(United States) RLR Andersen Racing	5	(United States) Daniel Herrington	13–16
(United States) RLR Andersen Racing	25	(United States) J. R. Hildebrand	All
(United States) Michael Crawford Motorsports	6	(United States) Jake Slotten	1, 4–5
(United States) Michael Crawford Motorsports	6	(United States) Robbie Pecorari	2–3
(United States) Michael Crawford Motorsports	6	(United States) Daniel Herrington	8–9, 11–12
(United States) Michael Crawford Motorsports	6	(United States) C. R. Crews	13
(United States) Michael Crawford Motorsports	6	(United States) Tom Dyer	14–16
(United States) Michael Crawford Motorsports	8	(United Kingdom) Nathan Freke	1–3
(United States) Michael Crawford Motorsports	8	(United States) Mark Olson	4–9, 11–12, 14–15
(United States) Michael Crawford Motorsports	8	(United States) P. J. Abbott	13
(United States) Sam Schmidt Motorsports	7	(United States) Richard Antinucci	All
(United States) Sam Schmidt Motorsports	11	(Australia) James Davison	All
(United States) Sam Schmidt Motorsports	20	(Brazil) Ana Beatriz	All
(United States) Sam Schmidt Motorsports	34	(United States) Jon Brownson	1, 4–6
(United States) Sam Schmidt Motorsports	34	(United States) Travis Gregg	7, 13
(United States) Sam Schmidt Motorsports	77	(New Zealand) Jonny Reid	14–15
(United States) Integra Motorsports w/ CGRT	9	(New Zealand) Marc Williams	2–3
(United States) Integra Motorsports w/ CGRT	9	(New Zealand) Jonny Reid	5–12
(United States) Integra Motorsports w/ CGRT	9	(New Zealand) Wade Cunningham	16
(United States) Panther Racing	15	(United Kingdom) Dillon Battistini	1–15
(United States) Panther Racing	15	(United States) Bobby Wilson	16
(United States) Panther Racing	16	(United States) Brent Sherman	All
(United States) Team E	17	(United States) Bobby Wilson	1–13
(United States) American Spirit Racing	18	(Switzerland) Cyndie Allemann	All
(United States) Playa Del Racing	21	(United States) Al Unser III	1–5
(United States) Alliance Motorsports	24	(United States) Chris Festa	1–6, 10
(United States) Alliance Motorsports	24	(New Zealand) Marc Williams	7
(United States) Alliance Motorsports	24	(New Zealand) Wade Cunningham	11–12
(United States) Alliance Motorsports	24	(New Zealand) Christina Orr	13–16
(United States) Andretti Green-AFS Racing	26	(Netherlands) Arie Luyendyk Jr.	All
(United States) Andretti Green-AFS Racing	27	(Brazil) Raphael Matos	All
(United States) SWE Racing	43	(Chile) Pablo Donoso	1–4
(United States) SWE Racing	43	(United States) Robbie Pecorari	5, 7, 10
(United States) SWE Racing	43	(United States) Mike Potekhen	13–16
(United States) SWE Racing	92	(United States) Mike Potekhen	5
(United States) Mile High Motorsports	54	(United States) Micky Gilbert	1–4

== Schedule ==
The biggest change within the schedule came with the discontinuation of the Liberty Challenge at the Indianapolis Motor Speedway road course, after the United States Grand Prix entered into a hiatus. Its two races were replaced with a return to Kansas Speedway, where the series had not raced since 2004, and a second race at Mid-Ohio, which meant that all road course events had been turned into doubleheaders. With the return of Kansas, most IndyCar races on U.S. ovals were supported by Indy Lights, with the exception of Texas and Richmond.

Rd.	Date	Race name	Track	Location
1	March 29	Miami 100	O Homestead–Miami Speedway	Homestead, Florida
2	April 5–6	Grand Prix of St. Petersburg	R Streets of St. Petersburg	St. Petersburg, Florida
3	April 5–6	Grand Prix of St. Petersburg	R Streets of St. Petersburg	St. Petersburg, Florida
4	April 27	Hard Rock 100	O Kansas Speedway	Kansas City, Kansas
5	May 23	Firestone Freedom 100	O Indianapolis Motor Speedway	Speedway, Indiana
6	June 1	Milwaukee 100	O Milwaukee Mile	West Allis, Wisconsin
7	June 21	Jeld-Wen 100	O Iowa Speedway	Newton, Iowa
8	July 5	Corning Duels at Watkins Glen	R Watkins Glen International	Watkins Glen, New York
9	July 5	Corning Duels at Watkins Glen	R Watkins Glen International	Watkins Glen, New York
10	July 12	Sun Belt Rentals 100	O Nashville Superspeedway	Lebanon, Tennessee
11	July 19–20	Mid-Ohio 100	R Mid-Ohio Sports Car Course	Lexington, Ohio
12	July 19–20	Mid-Ohio 100	R Mid-Ohio Sports Car Course	Lexington, Ohio
13	August 9	Kentucky 100	O Kentucky Speedway	Sparta, Kentucky
14	August 23–24	Carneros 100	R Infineon Raceway	Sonoma, California
15	August 23–24	Valley of the Moon 100	R Infineon Raceway	Sonoma, California
16	September 7	SunRichGourmet.com 100	O Chicagoland Speedway	Joliet, Illinois

O Oval/Speedway
R Road/Street course

== Race results ==
Round	Race	Pole position	Fastest lap	Most laps led	Race Winner	
Round	Race	Pole position	Fastest lap	Most laps led	Driver	Team
1	Homestead–Miami Speedway	(Brazil) Raphael Matos	(United States) Sean Guthrie	(United States) Richard Antinucci	(United Kingdom) Dillon Battistini	Panther Racing
2	Streets of St. Petersburg	(Brazil) Raphael Matos	(Brazil) Raphael Matos	(Brazil) Raphael Matos	(Brazil) Raphael Matos	Andretti Green-AFS Racing
3	Streets of St. Petersburg	(United States) Jeff Simmons (Note: No qualifying sessions were held for Race 2 of doubleheader weekends. The grid was decided by the results of Race 1, with the top 4 finishers in reverse order, and no bonus point was awarded for pole position.)	(Brazil) Raphael Matos	(United States) Jeff Simmons	(United States) Richard Antinucci	Sam Schmidt Motorsports
4	Kansas Speedway	(United States) Richard Antinucci (Note: Qualifying for Kansas was cancelled due to rain. The grid was set by entrant points entering the race, and no bonus point was awarded for pole position.)	(Brazil) Ana Beatriz	(United States) J. R. Hildebrand	(United States) J. R. Hildebrand	RLR Andersen Racing
5	Indianapolis Motor Speedway	(United Kingdom) Dillon Battistini	(United States) Bobby Wilson	(United Kingdom) Dillon Battistini	(United Kingdom) Dillon Battistini	Panther Racing
6	Milwaukee Mile	(Chile) Pablo Donoso	(United States) Bobby Wilson	(United States) Bobby Wilson	(United States) Bobby Wilson	Team E
7	Iowa Speedway	(Netherlands) Arie Luyendyk Jr.	(United Kingdom) Dillon Battistini	(Netherlands) Arie Luyendyk Jr.	(United Kingdom) Dillon Battistini	Panther Racing
8	Watkins Glen International	(France) Franck Perera	(Brazil) Raphael Matos	(Brazil) Raphael Matos	(Brazil) Raphael Matos	Andretti Green-AFS Racing
9	Watkins Glen International	(United States) Logan Gomez (Note: No qualifying sessions were held for Race 2 of doubleheader weekends. The grid was decided by the results of Race 1, with the top 6 finishers in reverse order, and no bonus point was awarded for pole position.)	(Brazil) Raphael Matos	(United States) Richard Antinucci	(United States) Richard Antinucci	Sam Schmidt Motorsports
10	Nashville Superspeedway	(Australia) James Davison	(Netherlands) Arie Luyendyk Jr.	(Brazil) Ana Beatriz	(Brazil) Ana Beatriz	Sam Schmidt Motorsports
11	Mid-Ohio Sports Car Course	(Brazil) Raphael Matos	(Brazil) Raphael Matos	(Brazil) Raphael Matos	(Brazil) Raphael Matos	Andretti Green-AFS Racing
12	Mid-Ohio Sports Car Course	(New Zealand) Jonny Reid	(New Zealand) Mitch Cunningham	(New Zealand) Jonny Reid	(Australia) James Davison	Sam Schmidt Motorsports
13	Kentucky Speedway	(Brazil) Raphael Matos	(Netherlands) Arie Luyendyk Jr.	(United Kingdom) Dillon Battistini	(United Kingdom) Dillon Battistini	Panther Racing
14	Infineon Raceway	(France) Franck Perera	(France) Franck Perera	(France) Franck Perera	(France) Franck Perera	Guthrie Racing
15	Infineon Raceway	(Chile) Pablo Donoso (Note: No qualifying sessions were held for Race 2 of doubleheader weekends. The grid was decided by the results of Race 1, with the top 8 finishers in reverse order, and no bonus point was awarded for pole position.)	(France) Franck Perera	(Chile) Pablo Donoso	(Chile) Pablo Donoso	Team Moore Racing
16	Chicagoland Speedway	(Brazil) Raphael Matos	(United States) Brent Sherman	(Brazil) Raphael Matos	(Netherlands) Arie Luyendyk Jr.	Andretti Green-AFS Racing

== Race summaries ==
=== Miami 100 ===
- Saturday March 29, 2008
- Homestead-Miami Speedway, Homestead, Florida
- Race weather: 82 °F, fair skies
- Pole position winner: #27 Raphael Matos 57.2075 sec (2 laps) 186.899 mph (300.785 km/h)
- Race Summary: As opposed to the previous year's race which was repeatedly slowed by major incidents, the 2008 season opener ran free of any major incidents. Polesitter Raphael Matos was passed in the opening laps by a hard-charging Richard Antinucci who started fifth. Antinucci dominated the middle portion of the race, but when he started to reach lapped traffic, rookie Dillon Battistini was able to catch him and the two battled for the remainder of the race. Following a caution flag with less than 10 laps to go, Battistini was able to find his way around Antinucci to take his first series win in his first race, which was also his first race on an oval track. The 23 cars running at the finish is a series record.

Top Five Finishers
Fin. Pos	St. Pos	Car No.	Driver	Team	Laps	Time	Laps Led	Points
1	2	15	(United Kingdom) Dillon Battistini	Panther Racing	67	0:38:07.8215	4	50
2	5	7	(United States) Richard Antinucci	Sam Schmidt Motorsports	67	+1.6848	45	42
3	13	16	(United States) Brent Sherman	Panther Racing	67	+4.0942	0	35
4	11	26	(Netherlands) Arie Luyendyk Jr.	AGR-AFS Racing	67	+4.1484	0	32
5	15	24	(United States) Chris Festa	Alliance Motorsports	67	+4.1992	0	30
Race average speed: 156.560 mph (251.959 km/h)
Lead changes: 4 between 3 drivers
Cautions: 2 for 7 laps

=== St. Pete 100 Race 1 ===
- Saturday April 5, 2008
- Streets of St. Petersburg, St. Petersburg, Florida
- Race weather: 84 °F, fair skies
- Pole position winner: #27 Raphael Matos 1:06.4669 sec, 97.492 mph (156.898 km/h)
- Race Summary: Raphael Matos dominated the race and captured his third win at St. Pete in 3 races. The race was slowed 3 times early in the race by caution flags caused by two spins by Bobby Wilson and Mitchell Cunningham going off course, but the final 26 laps were run without a full-course caution. Matos drew the number four following the race, meaning that the top four positions would be inverted and Jeff Simmons would start race 2 from the pole.

Top Five Finishers
Fin. Pos	St. Pos	Car No.	Driver	Team	Laps	Time	Laps Led	Points
1	1	27	(Brazil) Raphael Matos	AGR-AFS Racing	40	0:49:25.5158	40	51
2	2	7	(United States) Richard Antinucci	Sam Schmidt Motorsports	40	+3.1577	0	40
3	3	20	(Brazil) Ana Beatriz	Sam Schmidt Motorsports	40	+10.8371	0	35
4	5	2	(United States) Jeff Simmons	Team Moore Racing	40	+15.2206	0	32
5	6	25	(United States) J. R. Hildebrand	RLR-Andersen Racing	40	+15.6018	0	30
Race average speed: 87.405 mph (140.665 km/h)
Lead changes: none
Cautions: 3 for 6 laps

=== St. Pete 100 Race 2 ===
- Sunday April 6, 2008
- Streets of St. Petersburg, St. Petersburg, Florida
- Race weather: 79 °F, overcast
- Pole position winner: #2 Jeff Simmons (4th place in race 1)
- Race Summary: Jeff Simmons led the first half of the race from the pole, which was slowed many times by caution flags. On a restart on lap 25, the fastest car on the track Raphael Matos tried to pass Simmons, but the two banged wheels and Ana Beatriz passed both of them and took the lead. Simmons would eventually retire from the race due to the damage incurred and Matos had to pit to replace a flattened tire. Beatriz would lead until a restart on lap 30 when she and her teammate came together in the middle of turn 1. Beatriz spun and attempted to rejoin the race right in front of the car of Pablo Donoso. The two made heavy contact and were out of the race. Antinucci continued on to the victory. He was later penalized 10 points for making avoidable contact with Beatriz.

Top Five Finishers
Fin. Pos	St. Pos	Car No.	Driver	Team	Laps	Time	Laps Led	Points
1	3	7	(United States) Richard Antinucci	Sam Schmidt Motorsports	40	0:56:59.4231	8	40
2	5	25	(United States) J. R. Hildebrand	RLR-Andersen Racing	40	+1.5415	0	40
3	23	23	(United States) Logan Gomez	Guthrie Racing	40	+2.4302	0	35
4	21	15	(United Kingdom) Dillon Battistini	Panther Racing	40	+5.8187	0	32
5	15	4	(United States) Sean Guthrie	Guthrie Racing	40	+8.8457	0	30
Race average speed: 75.802 mph (121.991 km/h)
Lead changes: 2 between 3 drivers
Cautions: 5 for 16 laps

=== Kansas Lottery 100 ===
- Sunday April 27, 2008
- Kansas Speedway, Kansas City, Kansas
- Race weather: 56 °F, sunny
- Pole position winner: #7 Richard Antinucci (entrant points)
- Race Summary: Qualifying was scheduled for the morning of the race but low temperatures caused it to be canceled and the field lined up based on entrant points, giving points leader Richard Antinucci the pole.

Antinucci was passed shortly after the start by a gaggle of cars including Dillon Battistini, Arie Luyendyk Jr., Raphael Matos, and J. R. Hildebrand. Hildebrand took the lead from Battistini on lap 20. On lap 56 Raphael Matos who was running in 6th made contact with Jeff Simmons and shot into the wall, knocking him out of the race and dropping him from second to fourth in points. Hildebrand was able to hold off a hard-charging Robbie Pecorari who started 23rd because he competed for a part-time team to capture his first Indy Lights victory in just his second race on an oval. Hildebrand also took the points lead by two points over Antinucci.

Top Five Finishers
Fin. Pos	St. Pos	Car No.	Driver	Team	Laps	Time	Laps Led	Points
1	4	25	(United States) J. R. Hildebrand	RLR-Andersen Racing	67	0:49:51.2368	47	52
2	23	55	(United States) Robbie Pecorari	Guthrie Racing	67	+0.0553	0	40
3	6	26	(Netherlands) Arie Luyendyk Jr.	AGR-AFS Racing	67	+0.2102	1	35
4	3	15	(United Kingdom) Dillon Battistini	Panther Racing	67	+0.3456	5	32
5	17	33	(New Zealand) Wade Cunningham	Brian Stewart Racing	67	+0.6222	0	30
Race average speed: 122.566 mph (197.251 km/h)
Lead changes: 8 between 4 drivers
Cautions: 5 for 30 laps

=== Firestone Freedom 100 ===
- Friday May 23, 2008
- Indianapolis Motor Speedway, Speedway, Indiana
- Race weather:
- Pole position winner: #15 Dillon Battistini 188.397 mph (303.196 km/h)
- Race Summary: Dillon Battistini led at the start and was consistently hounded by the cars of James Davison and Wade Cunningham throughout the race. The most spectacular moment of the race came when Davison and J. R. Hildebrand's cars came together on the backstretch, forcing nearby cars to go four-wide and Jeff Simmons to drop two tires into the grass to avoid the slowing pair of cars that sustained slight damage. During the final ten laps of the race, Richard Antinucci was able to catch a draft behind Battistini, but reported that when he pulled out of the draft to pass, he was unable to maintain enough speed to complete the maneuver and Battistini was able to cruise to his second win of the season.

Top Five Finishers
Fin. Pos	St. Pos	Car No.	Driver	Team	Laps	Time	Laps Led	Points
1	1	15	(United Kingdom) Dillon Battistini	Panther Racing	40	0:39:46.9495	38	53
2	6	7	(United States) Richard Antinucci	Sam Schmidt Motorsports	40	+0.2458	0	40
3	3	33	(New Zealand) Wade Cunningham	Brian Stewart Racing	40	+0.5033	1	35
4	13	43	(United States) Robbie Pecorari	SWE Racing	40	+0.7977	0	32
5	4	20	(Brazil) Ana Beatriz	Sam Schmidt Motorsports	40	+1.2230	0	30
Race average speed: 150.820 mph (242.721 km/h)
Lead changes: 4 between 3 drivers
Cautions: 3 for 9 laps

=== Milwaukee 100 ===
- Sunday June 1, 2008
- Milwaukee Mile, West Allis, Wisconsin
- Race weather: 65 °F (18 °C), sunny
- Pole position winner: #22 Pablo Donoso 145.699 mph (234.480 km/h)
- Race Summary: Pablo Donoso captured the first pole of his Indy Lights career. The race was slowed three times early on by incidents resulting in light contact with the wall by Ana Beatriz and Marc Williams and heavy contact by Mark Olson. After the third caution ended on lap 29 the race went green for the final 71 laps. Bobby Wilson, who took the lead from Donoso on lap 13 drove away from the field and, although challenged late by Jeff Simmons, held on for his third series victory. The win was the first for his team (Team E) and Wilson's first of the season and first on an oval.

Top Five Finishers
Fin. Pos	St. Pos	Car No.	Driver	Team	Laps	Time	Laps Led	Points
1	2	17	(United States) Bobby Wilson	Team E	100	0:54:14.9446	88	52
2	3	2	(United States) Jeff Simmons	Team Moore Racing	100	+0.0893	0	40
3	7	27	(Brazil) Raphael Matos	AGR-AFS Racing	100	+16.3217	0	35
4	6	5	(United States) Andrew Prendeville	RLR-Andersen Racing	100	+17.3626	0	32
5	14	25	(United States) J. R. Hildebrand	RLR-Andersen Racing	100	+17.7737	0	30
Race average speed: 112.260 mph (180.665 km/h)
Lead changes: 1 between 2 drivers
Cautions: 3 for 17 laps

=== Jeld-Wen 100 ===
- Saturday June 21, 2008
- Iowa Speedway, Newton, Iowa
- Race weather: 80 °F (27 °C), Mostly Cloudy
- Pole position winner: #26 Arie Luyendyk Jr. 160.397 mph (258.134 km/h)
- Race Summary: The cars of Arie Luyendyk Jr. and Dillon Battistini dominated the race, with Luyendyk leading the first 101 laps from the pole and building an approximate 0.5 second lead on Battistini who built a several second lead on the rest of the field. On lap 102 Luyendyk came up on the nearly lap-down cars of Robbie Pecorari and James Davison running side by side and had to lift off the throttle to avoid, running over them. This allowed Battistini to squeeze by the slowed car of Luyendyk. Shortly thereafter on lap 106, Jonny Reid spun coming out of turn four and made moderate contact with the outside wall in what was the largest incident of the day. After cleanup, the green flag waved with one lap to go but Battistini was able to hold off Luyendyk, capturing his third win of the season and denying Luyendyk his first series win in 53 starts. Battistini also captured the points lead over prior leader Richard Antinucci who struggled to a 9th-place finish.

Top Five Finishers
Fin. Pos	St. Pos	Car No.	Driver	Team	Laps	Time	Laps Led	Points
1	2	15	(United Kingdom) Dillon Battistini	Panther Racing	115	0:47:05.6124	14	50
2	1	26	(Netherlands) Arie Luyendyk Jr.	AGR-AFS Racing	115	+0.4948	101	43
3	6	20	(Brazil) Ana Beatriz	Sam Schmidt Motorsports	115	+2.7089	0	35
4	5	16	(United States) Brent Sherman	Panther Racing	115	+2.8920	0	32
5	10	22	(Chile) Pablo Donoso	Team Moore Racing	115	+2.9664	0	30
Race average speed: 130.986 mph (210.802 km/h)
Lead changes: 1 between 2 drivers
Cautions: 4 for 18 laps

=== Corning Duels Race 1 ===
- Saturday July 5, 2008
- Watkins Glen International, Watkins Glen, New York
- Race weather: 72°, Sunny
- Pole position winner: #55 Franck Perera 1:37.8651 sec, 123.967 mph (199.506 km/h)
- Race summary: The race started under caution as James Davison stalled on track and Matt Lee spun during the pace laps. Once the green flag flew, Raphael Matos and Richard Antinucci passed polesitter Franck Perera in turn 4. Later that lap, Perera spun in the "toe" of the "boot" while J. R. Hildebrand and Bobby Wilson spun in the very next corner. The race was slowed one more time by a solo spin by points leader Dillon Battistini who had struggled all weekend. Matos dominated the remaining laps and won the race by over 2 seconds in front of his closest pursuer Antinucci. The race was ended 1 lap prior to the scheduled length because of the series imposed 1 hour time limit.

Top Five Finishers
Fin. Pos	St. Pos	Car No.	Driver	Team	Laps	Time	Laps Led	Points
1	2	27	(Brazil) Raphael Matos	AGR-AFS Racing	28	1:01:18.6862	26	53
2	4	7	(United States) Richard Antinucci	Sam Schmidt Motorsports	28	+2.1290	0	40
3	3	2	(United States) Jeff Simmons	Team Moore Racing	28	+9.3592	0	35
4	6	20	(Brazil) Ana Beatriz	Sam Schmidt Motorsports	28	+15.4980	0	32
5	8	22	(Chile) Pablo Donoso	Team Moore Racing	28	+16.6814	0	30
Race average speed: 92.342 mph (148.610 km/h)
Lead changes: 1 between 2 drivers
Cautions: 3 for 8 laps

=== Corning Duels Race 2 ===
- Saturday July 5, 2008
- Watkins Glen International, Watkins Glen, New York
- Race weather: 76°, Sunny
- Pole position winner: #23 Logan Gomez (6th place in race 1)
- Race summary: The number six was drawn meaning that the top 6 positions from the first race would be inverted for race two and Logan Gomez would start from the pole. Ana Beatriz who started third took the lead from Gomez on lap 1 as Jonny Reid crashed, bringing out an early caution. After the restart Richard Antinucci climbed through the field to pass his teammate Beatriz for the lead on lap 10. Raphael Matos eventually found his way around Beatriz and began closing on Antinucci in the lead. Cyndie Allemann made heavy contact bringing out a full course caution and eliminating Antinucci's lead. However, Antinucci had a tremendous restart and was able to build his lead back to over 1 second and capture his second win of the season and regain the points lead.

Top Five Finishers
Fin. Pos	St. Pos	Car No.	Driver	Team	Laps	Time	Laps Led	Points
1	5	7	(United States) Richard Antinucci	Sam Schmidt Motorsports	29	0:59:43.9195	20	53
2	6	27	(Brazil) Raphael Matos	AGR-AFS Racing	29	+0.7209	0	40
3	3	20	(Brazil) Ana Beatriz	Sam Schmidt Motorsports	29	+8.9378	9	35
4	1	23	(United States) Logan Gomez	Guthrie Racing	29	+11.4922	0	32
5	2	22	(Chile) Pablo Donoso	Team Moore Racing	29	+12.0037	0	30
Race average speed: 98.168 mph (157.986 km/h)
Lead changes: 1 between 2 drivers
Cautions: 3 for 8 laps

=== Sunbelt Rentals 100 ===
- Saturday July 12, 2008
- Nashville Superspeedway, Lebanon, Tennessee
- Race weather: 88 °F (31 °C), Mostly Cloudy
- Pole position winner: #11 James Davison 51.8844 sec 180.401 mph (290.327 km/h) 2 lap average
- Race summary: The race was delayed approximately 90 minutes by rain. At the start, Raphael Matos spun, but his car was not damaged and he was able to continue the race from the back of the field. On lap 32 Ana Beatriz passed teammate polesitter James Davison to take the lead. On lap 45 Jonny Reid and Davison made contact with Reid's car nearly getting airborne, however both drivers were uninjured. On the restart Beatriz was able to pull away from second place Bobby Wilson to capture her first Indy Lights series win, the first by a female driver.

Top Five Finishers
Fin. Pos	St. Pos	Car No.	Driver	Team	Laps	Time	Laps Led	Points
1	2	20	(Brazil) Ana Beatriz	Sam Schmidt Motorsports	77	0:40:38.5208	45	53
2	8	17	(United States) Bobby Wilson	Team E	77	+1.2392	0	40
3	5	26	(Netherlands) Arie Luyendyk Jr.	AGR-AFS Racing	77	+3.5627	0	35
4	10	25	(United States) J. R. Hildebrand	RLR-Andersen Racing	77	+10.2598	0	32
5	4	27	(Brazil) Raphael Matos	AGR-AFS Racing	77	+11.9599	0	30
Race average speed: 147.778 mph (237.826 km/h)
Lead changes: 1 between 2 drivers
Cautions: 2 for 11 laps

=== Mid-Ohio 100 Race 1 ===
- Saturday July 19, 2008
- Mid-Ohio Sports Car Course, Lexington, Ohio
- Race weather:
- Pole position winner: #27 Raphael Matos 1:13.1434 sec, 111.135 mph (178.854 km/h)
- Race summary: Raphael Matos drove away from the field as he assumed the points lead and Dillon Battistini's bad luck continued. Matos led every lap of the race that was not slowed by any caution flags. The most significant incident occurred during the first lap when Wade Cunningham and Daniel Herrington made contact but were able to continue after dropping back, although Herrington's car required serious repair. Cunningham would recover to finish 12th while Herrington finished 21st after repairs. Another incident involved Battistini spinning off after light contact with Logan Gomez. He would finish 18th. Matos continued to stretch his lead over Perera late into the race and was essentially unchallenged for his third win of the year while Perera scored his first series podium finish.

Top Five Finishers
Fin. Pos	St. Pos	Car No.	Driver	Team	Laps	Time	Laps Led	Points
1	1	27	(Brazil) Raphael Matos	AGR-AFS Racing	40	0:51:00.9047	40	53
2	2	55	(France) Franck Perera	Guthrie Racing	40	+4.2603	0	40
3	4	7	(United States) Richard Antinucci	Sam Schmidt Motorsports	40	+11.0992	0	35
4	3	9	(New Zealand) Jonny Reid	Integra Motorsports w/ CGRT	40	+30.3922	0	32
5	9	25	(United States) J. R. Hildebrand	RLR-Andersen Racing	40	+32.2972	0	30
Race average speed: 106.227 mph (170.956 km/h)
Lead changes: none
Cautions: none

=== Mid-Ohio 100 Race 2 ===
- Sunday July 20, 2008
- Mid-Ohio Sports Car Course, Lexington, Ohio
- Race weather: Rain
- Pole position winner: #9 Jonny Reid (4th place in Race 1)
- Race summary: The race was delayed because of heavy downpours causing standing water on the track. As a result of the delay, the race's time limit was shortened to 40 minutes from the usual 60. Virtually every driver in the field spun at least once and 10 of the 20 laps run were run under caution. Polesitter Jonny Reid led the first 16 laps until he was passed by Mitch Cunningham as the track finally started to dry. However, two laps later, Cunningham spun, handing the lead back to Reid. On the final lap of the race, Richard Antinucci, Robbie Pecorari, and Logan Gomez tangled, bringing out yet another full course caution and the race was to end under yellow with Reid all but assured his first series victory. However, Reid pulled into the pits, following the pace car as he thought the race was over, handing the win to James Davison, which was his first in the series. Points leader Raphael Matos had crashed early in the race and finished 18th. Reid was credited with 9th place.

Top Five Finishers
Fin. Pos	St. Pos	Car No.	Driver	Team	Laps	Time	Laps Led	Points
1	7	11	(Australia) James Davison	Sam Schmidt Motorsports	20	0:41:52.5298	1	50
2	12	24	(New Zealand) Wade Cunningham	Alliance Motorsports	20	+1.7928	0	40
3	10	22	(Chile) Pablo Donoso	Team Moore Racing	20	+1.9196	0	35
4	17	18	(Switzerland) Cyndie Allemann	American Spirit Racing	20	+2.4603	0	32
5	9	20	(Brazil) Ana Beatriz	Sam Schmidt Motorsports	20	+3.3957	0	30
Race average speed: 64.706 mph (104.134 km/h)
Lead changes: 3 among 3 drivers
Cautions: 5 for 10 laps

=== Kentucky 100 ===
- Sunday August 9, 2008
- Kentucky Speedway, Sparta, Kentucky
- Race weather: Partly cloudy
- Pole position winner: #27 Raphael Matos 55.9064 sec, 190.604 mph (2 lap average)
- Race summary: Dillon Battistini, who started 4th, took the lead from Ana Beatriz on lap 2 and led the rest of the way for his fourth win of the season. 20 of the race's final 29 laps were run under caution due to three separate incidents that took out Jeff Simmons, Pablo Donoso, Christina Orr and C. R. Crews.

Top Five Finishers
Fin. Pos	St. Pos	Car No.	Driver	Team	Laps	Time	Laps Led	Points
1	4	15	(United Kingdom) Dillon Battistini	Panther Racing	67	0:48:02.5443	66	53
2	5	11	(Australia) James Davison	Sam Schmidt Motorsports	67	+0.0814	0	40
3	3	26	(Netherlands) Arie Luyendyk Jr.	AGR-AFS Racing	67	+0.3057	0	35
4	10	7	(United States) Richard Antinucci	Sam Schmidt Motorsports	67	+0.4001	0	32
5	6	16	(United States) Brent Sherman	Panther Racing	67	+0.6670	0	30
Race average speed: 123.841 mph (199.303 km/h)
Lead changes: 1 among 2 drivers
Cautions: 4 for 27 laps

=== Carneros 100 ===
- Saturday August 23, 2008
- Infineon Raceway, Sonoma, California
- Race weather: Sunny
- Pole position winner: #55 Franck Perera 1:23.2851 sec, 99.547 mph (160.205 km/h)
- Race summary: Polesitter Franck Perera led every lap to capture his first Indy Lights victory and Guthrie Racing's first win of the season. Richard Antinucci had passed outside front row starter Raphael Matos, his closest pursuer in the championship, at the start of the race for the second position, but was penalized and put back behind Matos. Matos took the points lead by a single point on points earned from this race.

Top Five Finishers
Fin. Pos	St. Pos	Car No.	Driver	Team	Laps	Time	Laps Led	Points
1	1	55	(France) Franck Perera	Guthrie Racing	30	0:47:40.8370	30	53
2	2	27	(Brazil) Raphael Matos	AGR-AFS Racing	30	+3.7395	0	40
3	3	7	(United States) Richard Antinucci	Sam Schmidt Motorsports	30	+7.4447	0	35
4	6	25	(United States) J. R. Hildebrand	RLR-Andersen Racing	30	+15.3659	0	32
5	4	23	(United States) Logan Gomez	Guthrie Racing	30	+15.9528	0	30
Race average speed: 86.940 mph (139.916 km/h)
Lead changes: 0 among 0 drivers
Cautions: 2 for 4 laps

=== Valley of the Moon 100 ===
- Sunday August 24, 2008
- Infineon Raceway, Sonoma, California
- Race weather: Sunny
- Pole position winner: #22 Pablo Donoso (8th place in first race)
- Race summary: Due to a random draw, the first eight finishing positions from the Carneros 100 were used to determine the starting lineup for the Valley of the Moon 100, putting Pablo Donoso on the pole and Richard Antinucci, Raphael Matos, and Franck Perera in 6th, 7th, and 8th respectively. On the first lap, Mitch Cunningham made contact with another car and ran off track with his car coming to rest upside down and Logan Gomez was able to find his way from fourth to second. After the restart, Donoso was able to pull away from Gomez and led every lap as the race was not again slowed by caution. On lap 27, Matos had a run on Antinucci coming into turn 10, however, Antinucci slammed the door and Matos was forced to dive off track to avoid contact. Coming into turn 11, as both were under pressure from Perera who had gained on them after the theatrics in the previous turn, Matos bumped Antinucci from behind, sending him wide while both drivers were passed by Perera. The incident is under review by race officials. Donoso's win is his as well as his team's first in the series and he becomes the record 9th different driver to win in a single season.

Top Five Finishers
Fin. Pos	St. Pos	Car No.	Driver	Team	Laps	Time	Laps Led	Points
1	1	22	(Chile) Pablo Donoso	Team Moore Racing	30	0:46:30.5168	30	51
2	4	23	(United States) Logan Gomez	Guthrie Racing	30	+2.0001	0	40
3	3	20	(Brazil) Ana Beatriz	Sam Schmidt Motorsports	30	+8.3966	0	35
4	5	25	(United States) J. R. Hildebrand	RLR-Andersen Racing	30	+9.3983	0	32
5	8	55	(France) Franck Perera	Guthrie Racing	30	+10.5459	0	30
Race average speed: 89.132 mph (143.444 km/h)
Lead changes: 0 among 0 drivers
Cautions: 1 for 3 laps

=== SunRichGourmet.com 100 ===
- Sunday September 7, 2008
- Chicagoland Speedway, Joliet, Illinois
- Race weather: Sunny
- Pole position winner: #27 Raphael Matos 57.5243 sec, 190.250 mph (2 lap average)
- Race summary: The Team AGR-AFS Racing cars of Raphael Matos and Arie Luyendyk Jr. led 1-2 throughout the race, quickly followed by Ana Beatriz and Bobby Wilson who battled for third. A pivotal crash involving Richard Antinucci and Sean Guthrie on lap 26 sealed the 2008 Series Championship for Rafael Matos when Antinucci was unable to continue. Matos led his teammate entering the final lap. Luyendyk challenged and both Luyendyk and Beatriz passed Matos. Beatriz challenged for the lead but was unable to pass Luyendyk at the wire. Luyendyk won his first race after 62 starts in the series.

Top Five Finishers
Fin. Pos	St. Pos	Car No.	Driver	Team	Laps	Time	Laps Led	Points
1	3	26	(Netherlands) Arie Luyendyk Jr.	AGR-AFS Racing	67	0:46:46.7364	1	50
2	2	20	(Brazil) Ana Beatriz	Sam Schmidt Motorsports	67	+0.0817	0	40
3	1	27	(Brazil) Raphael Matos	AGR-AFS Racing	67	+0.1700	66	38
4	12	15	(United States) Bobby Wilson	Panther Racing	67	+0.2726	0	32
5	6	11	(Australia) James Davison	Sam Schmidt Motorsports	67	+0.4281	0	30
Race average speed: 130.623 mph (210.172 km/h)
Lead changes: 1 among 2 drivers
Cautions: 4 for 19 laps

== Championship standings ==
=== Drivers' Championship ===
Scoring system

Position	**1st**	**2nd**	**3rd**	**4th**	**5th**	**6th**	**7th**	**8th**	**9th**	**10th**	**11th**	**12th**	**13th**	**14th**	**15th**	**16th**	**17th**	**18th**	**19th**	**20th**	**21st**	**22nd**	**23rd**	**24th**	**+25th**
Points	50	40	35	32	30	28	26	24	22	20	19	18	17	16	15	14	13	12	11	10	9	8	7	6	5

- The driver who starts on pole is awarded one point (except for Race 2 of doubleheader weekends)
- The driver who leads the most laps in a race is awarded two additional points.

Pos	Driver	HMS	STP		KAN	INDY	MIL	IOW	WGL		NAS	MOH		KTY	SNM		CHI	Points
1	(Brazil) Raphael Matos	**8**	**1***	12	19	10	3	7	1*	2	5	**1***	18	**6**	2	6	**3***	510
2	(United States) Richard Antinucci	2*	2	1	**13^{1}**	2	16	9	2	1*	12	3	14	4	3	7	21	478
3	(Brazil) Ana Beatriz RY	7	3	16	14	5	19	3	4	3	1*	14	5	16	6	3	2	449
4	(Netherlands) Arie Luyendyk Jr.	4	6	22	3	14	8	**2***	7	7	3	8	11	3	17	16	1	428
5	(United States) J. R. Hildebrand R	10	5	2	1*	24	5	8	19	9	4	5	6	18	4	4	22	409
6	(United Kingdom) Dillon Battistini R	1	21	4	4	**1***	14	1	17	20	19	18	19	1*	18	15	23	385
7	(United States) Logan Gomez	12	23	3	15	7	9	14	6	**4^{i}**	6	20	16	12	5	2	8	361
8	(Chile) Pablo Donoso R	21	14	17	12	19	**7**	5	5	5	10	10	3	22	8	**1*^{i}**	13	358
9	(Australia) James Davison R	22	13	14	11	17	6	15	DNS	11	16	7	1	2	14	13	5	333
10	(United States) Sean Guthrie	11	15	5	6	12	10	20	13	10	8	13	7	7	13	9	17	322
11	(United States) Brent Sherman R	3	17	13	8	16	11	4	14	14	11	16	10	5	19	21	19	300
12	(United States) Bobby Wilson	17	22	21	9	6	1*	16	20	19	2	11	22	9			4	288
13	(United States) Jeff Simmons		4	**19*^{i}**	7	8	2	6	3	6	15	6	21	23				285
14	(Switzerland) Cyndie Allemann R	16	8	10	22	26	18	18	9	18	13	17	4	13	22	11	14	250
15	(United States) Andrew Prendeville	6	7	20	23	9	4	12	11	13	9	9	8					247
16	(United States) Robbie Pecorari		10	23	2	4		17			14	22	13	10	10	14	7	235
17	(France) Franck Perera							11	**18**	17	7	2	20	14	**1***	5		220
18	(New Zealand) Jonny Reid R					20	15	19	10	21	17	4	**9*^{i}**		9	19	11	186
19	(New Zealand) Wade Cunningham	9			5	3	12					12	2				24	169
20	(United States) Daniel Herrington								8	15		21	15	11	7	8	10	152
21	(United States) Micky Gilbert	15	16	11	20	21	17	13			20			15			12	140
22	(United States) Chris Festa	5	11	15	16	18	13				18							119
23	(New Zealand) Mitch Cunningham R		19	18					12	12		15	12		11	23		118
24	(United States) Mark Olson R				18	25	20	22	15	16		19	17		23	20		105
25	(United States) Al Unser III	13	12	6	10	11												102
26	(Peru) Juan Manuel Polar R	14	9	7	DNS										15	12		100
27	(United States) Jonathan Klein													8	16	10	6	86
28	(New Zealand) Marc Williams		18	9		15	21	10										78
29	(United States) Mike Potekhen					13								17	12	22	9	78
30	(New Zealand) Christina Orr R													21	20	18	16	45
31	(United Kingdom) Nathan Freke R	20	20	8														44
32	(United States) Matt Lee R								16	8								38
33	(United States) Tom Dyer R														21	17	20	32
34	(United States) Tom Wieringa	18				22											18	32
35	(United States) Jake Slotten R	19			17	23												31
36	(United States) Jon Brownson	23			21	27	DNS											23
37	(United States) Brandon Wagner R																15	15
38	(United States) Travis Gregg							21						24				15
39	(United States) P. J. Abbott													19				11
40	(United States) C. R. Crews													20				10
Pos	Driver	HMS	STP		KAN	INDY	MIL	IOW	WGL		NAS	MOH		KTY	SNM		CHI	Points

Color	Result
Gold	Winner
Silver	2nd place
Bronze	3rd place
Green	4th & 5th place
Light Blue	6th–10th place
Dark Blue	Finished (Outside Top 10)
Purple	Did not finish
Red	Did not qualify (DNQ)
Brown	Withdrawn (Wth)
Black	Disqualified (DSQ)
White	Did not start (DNS)
Blank	Did not participate (DNP)
Blank	Not competing

**In-line notation**
**Bold**	Pole position (1 point)
Italics	Ran fastest race lap
*	Led most race laps (2 points)
^{1}	Qualifying cancelled no bonus point awarded
^{i}	Partially inverted field no bonus point awarded
Rookie of the Year
Rookie

- Ties in points broken by number of wins, or best finishes.
