= Bobby Wilson (racing driver) =

American racing driver

- Nationality: American
- Born: October 6, 1981 (age 45) Oconomowoc, Wisconsin, U.S.

Firestone Indy Lights Series
- Years active: 2005-2008
- Teams: Michael Crawford Motorsports; Kenn Hardley Racing; Brian Stewart Racing; Team E
- Starts: 46
- Wins: 3
- Poles: 0
- Best finish: 4th in 2006 & 2007

Previous series
- 2004: Formula Ford 2000 Zetec

Awards
- 2003 2003: Jim Trueman Scholarship; Shifter Kart Illustrated driver of the year

Bobby Wilson (born October 6, 1981 in Oconomowoc, Wisconsin) is an American former racing driver.

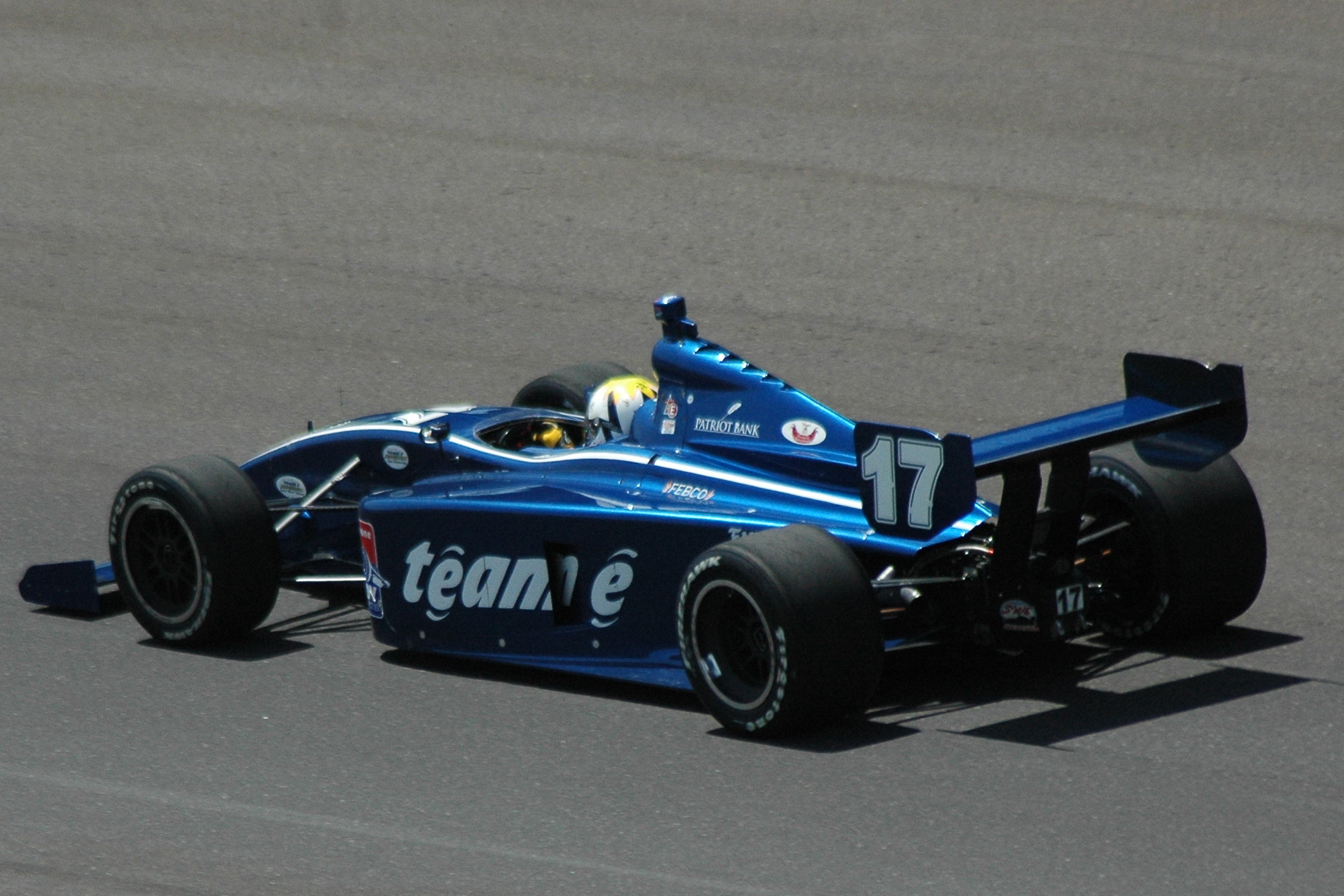
Wilson driving in the 2008 Firestone Freedom 100

An accomplished karter, Wilson won the "Stars of Tomorrow" championship and the Jim Trueman Scholarship in 2003 and was Shifter Kart Illustrated's driver of the year. He moved up to cars the following year and won the Formula Ford 2000 Zetec championship with four wins in his rookie season. In 2005, he made his Indy Pro Series debut with three starts for Brian Stewart Racing. In 2006, running for Michael Crawford and Kenn Hardley, he finished fourth in the Pro Series standings, capturing his first win from the pole at Watkins Glen International. For the 2007 season, he returned to Brian Stewart and won in Liberty Challenge Race 2 on the Indianapolis Motor Speedway road course. In 2008, he continued in the series, then known as the Firestone Indy Lights Series and for the new Team E outfit. He captured his first oval victory at the Milwaukee Mile on June 1.

The 2008 Indy Lights season was his last professional race appearance.

== Racing record ==
=== American open–wheel racing results ===
(key) (Races in bold indicate pole position)

==== SCCA National Championship Runoffs ====
Year	Track	Car	Engine	Class	Finish	Start	Status
2001	Mid-Ohio	Van Diemen RF01	Ford	Formula Continental	24	5	DNF

==== Indy Lights ====
Year	Team	1	2	3	4	5	6	7	8	9	10	11	12	13	14	15	16	Rank	Points
2005	Brian Stewart Racing	HMS	PHX	STP	INDY	TXS	IMS	NSH	MIL	KTY	PPIR	SNM; 11	CHI; 8	WGL; 9	FON; 13			14th	82
2006	Michael Crawford Motorsports	HMS; 5	STP1; 8	STP2; 6														4th	343
2006	Kenn Hardley Racing				INDY; 7	**WGL**; 1	IMS; 9	NSH; 7	MIL; 4	KTY; 7	SNM1; 5	SNM2; 2	CHI; 17					4th	343
2007	Brian Stewart Racing	HMS; 6	STP1; 6	**STP2**; 3	INDY; 22	MIL; 5	IMS1; 7	IMS2; 1	IOW; 9	WGL1; 5	WGL2; 12	NSH; 15	MOH; 6	KTY; 18	SNM1; 17	SNM2; 14	CHI; 4	4th	393
2008	Team E	HMS; 17	STP1; 22	STP2; 21	KAN; 9	INDY; 6	MIL; 1	IOW; 16	WGL1; 20	WGL2; 19	NSH; 2	MOH1; 11	MOH2; 22	KTY; 9	SNM1	SNM2		12th	288
2008	Panther Racing																CHI; 4	12th	288
