= Daniel Herrington =

American racing driver and entrepreneur

- Nationality: American
- Born: July 12, 1986 (age 40) Baltimore, Maryland, U.S.

Firestone Indy Lights Series
- Years active: 2007–2011
- Teams: SpeedWorks; Michael Crawford Motorsports; Bryan Herta Autosport; Genoa Racing; Sam Schmidt Motorsports
- Starts: 33
- Wins: 1
- Poles: 0
- Best finish: 7th in 2009

Previous series
- 2006 2004–2005: Star Mazda Series; Formula BMW USA

Daniel Herrington (born July 12, 1986) is an American racing driver from Baltimore, Maryland.

Herrington began his professional racing career in Formula BMW USA in 2004 with a partial schedule. He competed full-time in 2005 for Jensen Motorsport and finished twelfth in points. In 2006, he moved to the Star Mazda Series and finished tenth in points with one victory. In 2007, he made his Firestone Indy Lights Series (then called the Indy Pro Series) debut for SpeedWorks, competing in five road course races and placing 23rd in points. He drove another partial season in 2008, competing in eight races for Michael Crawford Motorsports and finishing twentieth in points. In 2009, he was announced to compete full-time for the new Bryan Herta Autosport team. Daniel captured his first FILS victory at the Chicagoland 100 and finished seventh in points. Herrington returned to the series for the penultimate race of 2010 at Kentucky, stepping into BHA's No. 29 car when Sebastián Saavedra quit mid-race weekend. He competed in the following race for Genoa Racing. In 2011, he competed in the Sam Schmidt Motorsports No. 77 car in Toronto while both the car's regular drivers, Conor Daly and Bryan Clauson, were unavailable due to other commitments. He also drove the car in the double-header in Edmonton.

Herrington currently resides in Raleigh, North Carolina.

== Racing record ==
=== American open–wheel racing results ===
(key)

==== Star Mazda Championship ====
Year	Team	1	2	3	4	5	6	7	8	9	10	11	12	Rank	Points
2006	AIM Autosport	SEB; 2	HOU; 1	MOH; 7	MIL; 2	MON; 28	MMP; 7	POR; 26	TRR	ROA	MOS	ATL; 34	LAG; 10	10th	252

==== Indy Lights ====
Year	Team	1	2	3	4	5	6	7	8	9	10	11	12	13	14	15	16	Rank	Points
2007	SpeedWorks	HMS	STP1	STP2	INDY	MIL	IMS1; 22	IMS2; 10	IOW	WGL1; 6	WGL2; 3	NSH	MOH; 20	KTY	SNM1	SNM2	CHI	23rd	101
2008	Michael Crawford Motorsports	HMS	STP1	STP2	KAN	INDY	MIL	IOW	WGL1; 8	WGL2; 15	NSH	MOH1; 21	MOH2; 15					20th	152
2008	RLR/Andersen Racing													KTY; 11	SNM1; 7	SNM2; 8	CHI; 10	20th	152
2009	Bryan Herta Autosport	STP1; 7	STP2; 5	LBH; 10	KAN; 6	INDY; 7	MIL; 14	IOW; 9	WGL; 6	TOR; 9	EDM; 9	KTY; 6	MOH; 6	SNM; 11	CHI; 1	HMS; 12		7th	383
2010	Bryan Herta Autosport	STP	ALA	LBH	INDY	IOW	WGL	TOR	EDM	MOH	SNM	CHI	KTY; 12					21st	44
2010	Genoa Racing													HMS; 7				21st	44
2011	Sam Schmidt Motorsports	STP	ALA	LBH	INDY	MIL	IOW	TOR; 12	EDM1; 9	EDM2; 7	TRO	NHM	BAL	KTY	LVS			21st	66
