= Robbie Pecorari =

American racing driver

- Nationality: American
- Full name: Roberto Pecorari
- Born: May 12, 1987 (age 39) Aston, Pennsylvania, U.S.

Firestone Indy Lights Series
- Years active: 2007–2008
- Teams: Guthrie Racing; SWE Racing; Michael Crawford Motorsports; Team KMA Racing
- Starts: 28
- Wins: 1
- Poles: 0
- Best finish: 8th in 2007

Previous series
- 2006 2004–2005 2004: Champ Car Atlantic Series; Star Mazda; Skip Barber Formula Dodge

Roberto "Robbie" Pecorari (born May 12, 1987) is an American racing driver from Aston, Pennsylvania.

== Career ==
One of America's most successful young karters, Pecorari won numerous regional and national World Karting Association and Stars of Karting championships before moving up to cars in late 2003. In 2004, he competed in numerous open-wheel developmental series, including Skip Barber Formula Dodge, where he finished fifth in series points, and the Star Mazda Series. In 2005, he competed in Star Mazda full-time and finished second in the championship, winning two races and rookie of the year honors.

In 2006, Pecorari competed in the Champ Car Atlantic Series for Gelles Racing, winning at Toronto and finishing eleventh in points. In 2007, he moved to the rival Indy Pro Series driving for Team KMA Racing, where he finished eighth in points with one win at Nashville Superspeedway. The series changed names to the Firestone Indy Lights Series for 2008 and Pecorari was left without a full-time ride. After missing the first race, Pecorari drove for three different teams on a part-time schedule, making twelve starts with a runner-up finish at Kansas Speedway and finished sixteenth in points.

In April 2009, Pecorari participated in an A1 Grand Prix Rookie Driver test session for A1 Team USA.

== Complete motorsports results ==
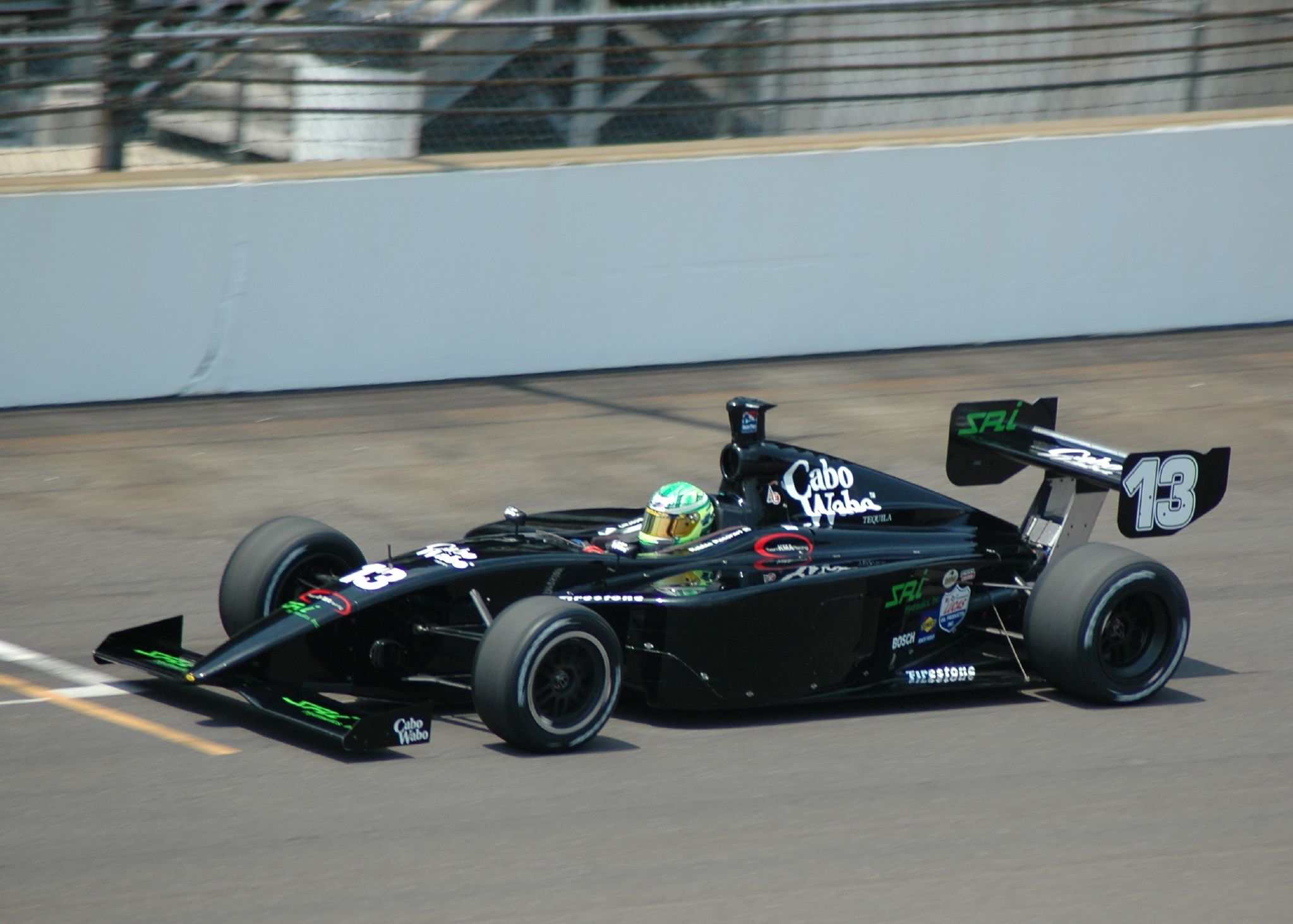
Pecorari practicing for the Freedom 100 in 2007

=== American Open-Wheel racing results ===
(key) (Races in bold indicate pole position, races in italics indicate fastest race lap)

==== USF2000 National Championship results ====
Year	Entrant	1	2	3	4	5	6	7	8	9	10	11	12	13	14	15	16	Pos	Points
2003	Andersen Walko Racing	SEB1	SEB2	LRP1	LRP1	MOH1	MOH2	ROA1	ROA2	MOH3	MOH4	ATL1; 23	ATL2; 23					**N.C.**	**N.C.**
2004	Andersen Walko Racing	SEB1	SEB2	ATL1	ATL2	LS1; 5	LS2; 8	MOS1	MOS2	MOH1	MOH2	SON1	SON2	MOH3	MOH4	ROA1	ROA2	**N.C.**	**N.C.**

==== Star Mazda Championship ====
Year	Team	1	2	3	4	5	6	7	8	9	10	11	12	Rank	Points
2004	Andersen Walko Racing	SEB	MOH	LRP	SON	POR	MOS	ROA	ATL; 4	PIR	LAG; 38			**N.C.**	**N.C.**
2005	Andersen Walko Racing	SEB; 6	ATL1; 11	MOH; 3	MON; 3	PPR; 1	SON1; 5	SON2; 4	POR; 3	RAM; 2	MOS; 2	**ATL2**; 1	LAG; 4	**2nd**	**441**
2006	John Walko Racing	SEB	HOU	MOH	MIL; 3	MON	MMP	POR	TRR	RAM	MOS	RAT	LAG	**N.C.**	**N.C.**

==== Atlantic Championship ====
Year	Team	1	2	3	4	5	6	7	8	9	10	11	12	Rank	Points
2006	Gelles Racing	LBH; 7	HOU; 18	MTY; 18	POR; 15	CLE1; 24	CLE2; 4	TOR; 1	EDM; 10	SJO; 21	DEN; 6	MTL; 11	ROA; 4	**11th**	**147**

==== Indy Lights ====
Year	Team	1	2	3	4	5	6	7	8	9	10	11	12	13	14	15	16	Rank	Points
2007	Team KMA Motorsports	HMS; 8	STP1; 7	STP2; 5	INDY; 11	MIL; 14	IMS1; 24	IMS2; 19	IOW; 5	WGL1; 22	WGL2; 11	NSH; 1	MOH; 7	KTY; 8	SNM1; 18	SNM2; 22	CHI; 3	**8th**	**344**
2008	Michael Crawford Racing	HMS	STP1; 10	STP2; 23														**16th**	**235**
2008	Guthrie Racing				KAN; 2							MOH1; 22	MOH2; 13	KTY; 10	SNM1; 10	SNM2; 14	CHI; 7	**16th**	**235**
2008	SWE Racing					INDY; 4	MIL	IOW; 17	WGL1	WGL2	NSH; 14							**16th**	**235**
