= Jonathan Klein (racing driver) =

American racing driver

Jonathan Klein (born June 23, 1987) is an American racing driver from Long Grove, Illinois.

After racing Formula Atlantic cars in the SCCA, Klein moved up to professional racing in 2005 in Star Mazda, finishing thirteenth for Andersen Walko Racing. In 2006, he moved to the Indy Pro Series driving for Andretti Green Racing. At the time, one of Andretti Green's IndyCar entries was sponsored by Klein Tools which at the time was headed by Jonathan Klein's father, Rick Klein. Klein finished second in Indy Pro Series points despite not winning, but did capture a pole at Kentucky Speedway, finishing second, and finished second in the season closer at Chicagoland Speedway. Klein returned to the series in 2007 driving for Team Moore Racing. Klein finished twelfth in points with a best finish of third (twice). He returned to the series (then called Firestone Indy Lights) and Team Moore for four late season races in 2008 in what were, as of 2010, his last professional race appearances.

== Racing results ==
=== American open-wheel results ===
==== Indy Lights ====
Year	Team	1	2	3	4	5	6	7	8	9	10	11	12	13	14	15	16	Rank	Points
2006	Andretti Green Racing	HMS; 15	STP1; 5	STP2; 5	INDY; 6	WGL; 5	IMS; 3	NSH; 3	MIL; 3	KTY; 2	SNM1; 4	SNM2; 3	CHI; 2					2nd	386
2007	Team Moore Racing	HMS	STP1; 3	STP2; 14	INDY; 10	MIL; 3	IMS1; 19	IMS2; 7	IOW; 18	WGL1; 11	WGL2; 9	NSH; 5	MOH; 19	KTY	SNM1; 9	SNM2; 6	CHI; 15	12th	304
2008	Team Moore Racing	HMS	STP1	STP2	KAN	INDY	MIL	IOW	WGL1	WGL2	NSH	MOH1	MOH2	KTY; 8	SNM1; 16	SNM2; 10	CHI; 6	27th	86
