= 2016 Atlantic Championship =

2016 Atlantic Championship Series season

Season
- Races: 16
- Start date: February 11
- End date: October 9

Awards
- Drivers' champion: (United States) Ryan Norman

The 2016 Atlantic Championship Series season was the fourth season of the revived Atlantic Championship. The series was organised by Formula Race Promotions under the sanctioning of SCCA Pro Racing.

American Ryan Norman won the championship winning eight of the fourteen races. Keith Grant had eight second-place finishes but only a single win and finished second in the championship. His brother David joined the series after four races, but captured five wins in the last ten races and finished third in points. American Bob Corliss won a tight battle over Bruce Hamilton to win the title of the Atlantic Challenge class for older cars.

Norman was granted a Road to Indy Shootout seat for a USF2000 drive in 2017, but after the Road to Indy Chris Griffis Memorial Test, was signed to Andretti Autosport to race in Indy Lights.

== Race calendar and results ==
Round	Circuit	Location	Date	Pole position	Fastest lap	Winning driver
	Winter Exhibition @ (Florida) Palm Beach International Raceway	(United States) Jupiter, Florida	February 13	(United States) Ryan Norman	(United States) Ryan Norman	(United States) Ryan Norman
	Winter Exhibition @ (Florida) Sebring International Raceway	(United States) Sebring, Florida	February 21	(United States) Ryan Norman	(United States) Ryan Norman	(United States) Ryan Norman
1	(Georgia (U.S. state)) Road Atlanta	(United States) Braselton, Georgia	April 9	(United States) Ryan Norman	(United States) Ryan Norman	(United States) Ryan Norman
2	(Georgia (U.S. state)) Road Atlanta	(United States) Braselton, Georgia	April 10	(United States) Ryan Norman	(United States) Ryan Norman	(United States) Keith Grant
3	(New York (state)) Watkins Glen International	(United States) Watkins Glen, New York	May 14	(United States) Keith Grant	(United States) Ryan Norman	(United States) Ryan Norman
4	(New York (state)) Watkins Glen International	(United States) Watkins Glen, New York	May 15	(United States) Keith Grant	(United States) Ryan Norman	(United States) Ryan Norman
5	Virginia International Raceway	(United States) Alton, Virginia	June 4	(United States) Ryan Norman	(United States) Ryan Norman	(United States) Ryan Norman
6	Virginia International Raceway	(United States) Alton, Virginia	June 5	(United States) Ryan Norman	(United States) Ryan Norman	(United States) Ryan Norman
7	Mid-Ohio Sports Car Course	(United States) Lexington, Ohio	July 2	(United States) David Grant	(United States) David Grant	(United States) David Grant
8	Mid-Ohio Sports Car Course	(United States) Lexington, Ohio	July 3	(United States) Keith Grant	(United States) Keith Grant	(United States) Ryan Norman
9	(Pennsylvania) Pittsburgh International Race Complex	(United States) Wampum, Pennsylvania	August 6	(United States) Ryan Norman	(United States) Ryan Norman	(United States) David Grant
10	(Pennsylvania) Pittsburgh International Race Complex	(United States) Wampum, Pennsylvania	August 7	(United States) Ryan Norman	(United States) David Grant	(United States) David Grant
11	New Jersey Motorsports Park	(United States) Millville, New Jersey	August 27	(United States) Ryan Norman	(United States) Ryan Norman	(United States) Ryan Norman
12	New Jersey Motorsports Park	(United States) Millville, New Jersey	August 28	(United States) Ryan Norman	(United States) David Grant	(United States) David Grant
13	Virginia International Raceway	(United States) Alton, Virginia	October 1	(United States) David Grant	(United States) Keith Grant	(United States) Ryan Norman
14	Virginia International Raceway	(United States) Alton, Virginia	October 2	(United States) David Grant	(United States) Keith Grant	(United States) David Grant

== Championship standings ==
Pos	Driver	(Florida) PBI^{EX}	(Florida) SEB^{EX}	(Georgia (U.S. state)) ATL		(New York (state)) WGL		(Virginia) VIR1		(Ohio) MOH		(Pennsylvania) PIT		(New Jersey) NJMP		(Virginia) VIR2		Points
1	(United States) Ryan Norman	**1**	**1**	**1**	6	1	1	**1**	**1**	3	1	**9**	**5**	**1**	**2**	1	2	586
2	(United States) Keith Grant			9	**1**	3	2	2	2	2	2	2	2	3	5	2	3	511
3	(United States) David Grant							9	3	**1**	3	1	1	2	1	**3**	**1**	423
4	(United States) Richard Zober			7	5	7	5	4	8	4	4	DNS		10	9	5	4	388
5	(United States) Chris Ash			6	8	8	10	3	5	6	6	4	6	11	6			318
6	(United States) Lewis Cooper Jr.			5	9	DNS	9	7	6	5	5					8	6	246
7	(United States) Lee Alexander			2	10	5	4	DNS				3	DNS	8	7			216
8	(United States) Kirk Kindsfater			8	4	12	6					5	8					137
9	(United States) Dudley Fleck					2	11									6	5	129
10	(United States) JohnPaul Ciancimino			4	7													68
11	(United States) Theodoros Zorbas											8	9					58
12	(United States) Lee Brahin													9	10			32
**Atlantic Challenge**
1	(United States) Bob Corliss			10	2	6	8	6	4	7	7	7	4	5	11	4	8	539
2	(United States) Bruce Hamilton	2	2	3	3	4	3	8	7	8	8	DNS	7	6	3	7	7	529
3	(United States) John Burke					11	12	5				6	DNS	7	8			206
4	(United States) Connor Burke					10	13	DNS	9			10	3	4	4			179
5	(United States) Mark Sherwood					9	7											79
Pos	Driver	(Florida) PBI^{EX}	(Florida) SEB^{EX}	(Georgia (U.S. state)) ATL		(New York (state)) WGL		(Virginia) VIR1		(Ohio) MOH		(Pennsylvania) PIT		(New Jersey) NJMP		(Virginia) VIR2		Points

Color	Result
Gold	Winner
Silver	2nd place
Bronze	3rd place
Green	4th & 5th place
Light Blue	6th–10th place
Dark Blue	Finished (Outside Top 10)
Purple	Did not finish
Red	Did not qualify (DNQ)
Brown	Withdrawn (Wth)
Black	Disqualified (DSQ)
White	Did not start (DNS)
Blank	Did not participate (DNP)
Blank	Not competing

**In-line notation**
**Bold**	Pole position (3 points)
Italics	Ran fastest race lap (2 points)

This list only contains drivers who registered for the championship.
Atlantic Challenge competitors are scored separately from main championship competitors for season standings.
