= Grand Prix of Road America =

IndyCar Series Race at Road America

Coordinates: 43°47′51″N 87°59′38″W

XPEL Grand Prix at Road America

IndyCar Series
- Venue: Road America
- Corporate sponsor: XPEL
- First race: 1982
- First ICS race: 2016
- Distance: 222.64 miles (358.304 km)
- Laps: 55
- Previous names: Road America 200 (1982); Provimi Veal 200 (1983–1985); Race for Life 200 (1986); LivingWell/Provimi 200 (1987); Briggs & Stratton 200 (1988); Texaco/Havoline 200 (1989–1990); The Chicago Tribune Presents the Texaco/Havoline 200 (1991–1999); Motorola 220 (2000–2002); Mario Andretti Grand Prix at Road America Presented by Briggs & Stratton (2003); Champ Car Grand Prix of Road America (2004); Grand Prix of Road America (2006); Generac Grand Prix (2007); Kohler Grand Prix (2016–2018); REV Group Grand Prix at Road America (2019–2021); Sonsio Grand Prix at Road America (2022–2023)
- Most wins (driver): Mario Andretti; Emerson Fittipaldi; Michael Andretti; Álex Palou (3)
- Most wins (team): Newman/Haas Racing (10)
- Most wins (manufacturer): Chassis: Lola; Dallara (12); Engine: Chevrolet (11)

The Grand Prix of Road America (known as the XPEL Grand Prix at Road America for sponsorship reasons) is an IndyCar Series race held at Road America in Elkhart Lake, Wisconsin. Christian Lundgaard is the defending winner of the event, having won it in 2026.

For twenty-five years, the event was part of CART/Champ Car World Series, with the first race being held in 1982. The event was put on hiatus in 2008 after the unification of Champ Car into the Indy Racing League. On August 8, 2015, it was announced that the race would return beginning in 2016. The race weekend typically includes all three series under the Road to Indy and the GT World Challenge America as support races.

== Race history ==
The first major open wheel racing at Road America was a USAC/SCCA Formula 5000 (SCCA Continental Championship) held from 1974 to 1976.

The CART Indy Car Series first visited Road America in 1982. Road America was one of several road and street races that were added to the series during the 1980s. Immediately, the race became a popular event, owing much to the challenging, competitive, and picturesque nature of the course. Along with Milwaukee, the CART series for many years featured two stops annually in the state of Wisconsin.

Since its inception, Road America has been the longest track utilized on the Indy car circuit. At 4.048 miles (6.515 km), fuel mileage has been a deciding factor in many races. On more than one occasion, competitors have run out of fuel within sight of victory, occasionally leading to surprise winners. In some years, rain has been a factor, again adding a difficult challenge to even the most experienced drivers.

Throughout nearly its entire history as part of the CART/CCWS series calendar, the race was scheduled for either August or September, usually late in the season. The race was oftentimes a pivotal race in the championship hunt. The race began as a 50-lap/200-mile race, but was later lengthened. In 2007 only, the race was paired in a double-header weekend with the ALMS Road America 500.

The high speeds obtained on the course have seen several major crashes. A. J. Foyt went off in turn one in 1990, and nearly ended his career due to severe leg and ankle injuries. During a test session in 2006, Cristiano da Matta hit a deer, suffering a subdural hematoma. Katherine Legge suffered one of the most severe crashes during the 2006 race. the car lost a rear wing going into the Turn 11 Kink, and flipped into the catchfence.

=== Race revival ===
In February 2003, CART officials filed a lawsuit against the promoters of the race, stating they had failed to pay sanctioning fees due from the previous year's race, and failed to make payments due for the 2003 race. On March 11, series officials cancelled the race outright.

The reaction among media and fans was very negative, as many believed the series was dropping one of its marquee events. A few weeks later, the track issued a countersuit against CART, stating that the sanctioning body broke the contract by cancelling the race. Mario Andretti stepped in to mediate, and in April the two sides came together to reinstate the event. The race was renamed the "Mario Andretti Grand Prix" in his honor.

After coming back for two more seasons, Road America was left off the 2005 Champ Car schedule due to lack of sponsorship and declining attendance. Promoters, however, were able to bring the race back for 2006 and 2007. The track was to be part of the 2008 Champ Car schedule, but it became a casualty of the 2008 open wheel unification. The event went on hiatus for nearly a decade.

In 2016, after several years of speculation, the race was revived as part of the IndyCar Series. The event was considered a rousing success, and reestablished the circuit as a marquee race on the IndyCar schedule. The race at Milwaukee had been put on hiatus after 2015, and Road America effectively replaced that event on the schedule. In 2024, Milwaukee returned to schedule, and the series once again makes two stops annually in the state of Wisconsin.

=== First wins ===
Despite the demanding and challenging nature of the course, Road America has been the site of the first career win for several drivers in Indy car racing. In early years, Héctor Rebaque and "Uncle" Jacques Villeneuve both scored their first and only wins in the Indy cars. In 1986, Emerson Fittipaldi won his second-career CART series race at Road America, but it was notably his first such win on a road course.

In the 1990s, Paul Tracy won his first career pole position at Road America, and Jacques Villeneuve followed in the footsteps of his uncle in winning his first Indy car race here as well.

Dario Franchitti, Christian Fittipaldi, Bruno Junqueira, and Alex Tagliani also all scored their first-career CART/Champ Car series wins at Road America. In 2020, Felix Rosenqvist won his first career IndyCar Series race, while Pato O'Ward (who finished second, and had led the most laps) scored his first pole position and first podium finish.

=== Unser Jinx ===
The father and son duo of Al Unser Sr. and Al Unser Jr., both champions in the CART series and multiple time Indianapolis 500 winners, notably failed to ever win a race at Road America. On numerous occasions, Unser Sr. or Unser Jr. were well on their way to victory, only for their race to come to a sudden end. This is in stark contrast to the rival Andretti family, which scored six victories at Road America but only one win (1969) at Indianapolis.

Al Sr. ran out of fuel on the final lap while leading in 1982. Al Jr. was leading handily in 1985 until he lost control in a sudden rain shower, crashed and broke his ankle. Unser Jr. crashed again in 1986, and ran out of fuel in 1988. In 1991, Michael Andretti narrowly beat out Unser Jr. in the final two laps. In 1996, Unser Jr. blew his engine on the final lap, two corners short of victory.

Al Unser Jr. also started on the pole in a Can-Am race at Road America, but broke the transmission on the second lap.

== Race results ==
Season	Date	Driver	Team	Chassis	Engine	Race Distance		Race Time	Average Speed (mph)	Report
Season	Date	Driver	Team	Chassis	Engine	Laps	Miles (km)	Race Time	Average Speed (mph)	Report
USAC/SCCA Formula 5000
1974	July 28	(United States) Mario Andretti	Vel's Parnelli Jones Racing	Lola	Chevrolet	25	100 (160.93)	0:53:02	124.741	Report
1975	July 27	(United States) Mario Andretti	Vel's Parnelli Jones Racing	Lola	Chevrolet	25	100 (160.93)	0:54:22	110.355	Report
1976	July 25	(United Kingdom) Jackie Oliver	Phoenix Racing	Shadow	Dodge	25	100 (160.93)	0:58:29	102.590	Report
1976	Aug 28	(United Kingdom) Brian Redman	Haas/Hall Racing	Lola	Chevrolet	20	80 (128.75)	0:42:59	111.640	Report
1976	Aug 29	(Australia) Vern Schuppan	Jorgensen Steel	Lola	Chevrolet	25	100 (160.93)	0:54:38	109.816	Report
1977 – 1981	Not held									
CART/Champ Car
1982	Sep 19	(Mexico) Héctor Rebaque	Forsythe Racing	March	Cosworth	50	200 (321.868)	1:49:56	109.156	Report
1983	July 31	(United States) Mario Andretti	Newman/Haas Racing	Lola	Cosworth	50	200 (321.868)	2:00:42	99.41	Report
1984	Aug 5	(United States) Mario Andretti (2)	Newman/Haas Racing (2)	Lola	Cosworth	50	200 (321.868)	1:43:08	116.347	Report
1985	Aug 4	(Canada) Jacques Villeneuve (Sr.)	Canadian Tire Racing	March	Cosworth	50	200 (321.868)	1:45:12	114.066	Report
1986	Sep 21/ Oct 4*	(Brazil) Emerson Fittipaldi	Patrick Racing	March	Cosworth	50	200 (321.868)	2:26:42	81.8	Report
1987	Aug 30	(United States) Mario Andretti (3)	Newman/Haas Racing (3)	Lola	Chevrolet	50	200 (321.868)	1:39:52	120.155	Report
1988	Sep 11	(Brazil) Emerson Fittipaldi (2)	Patrick Racing (2)	Lola	Chevrolet	50	200 (321.868)	1:38:11	122.215	Report
1989	Sep 10	(United States) Danny Sullivan	Penske Racing	Penske	Chevrolet	50	200 (321.868)	1:37:43	123.05	Report
1990	Sep 23	(United States) Michael Andretti	Newman/Haas Racing (4)	Lola	Chevrolet	50	200 (321.868)	1:53:00	106.192	Report
1991	Sep 22	(United States) Michael Andretti (2)	Newman/Haas Racing (5)	Lola	Chevrolet	50	200 (321.868)	1:35:05	126.205	Report
1992	Aug 23	(Brazil) Emerson Fittipaldi (3)	Penske Racing (2)	Penske	Chevrolet-Ilmor	50	200 (321.868)	1:48:26	110.656	Report
1993	Aug 22	(Canada) Paul Tracy	Penske Racing (3)	Penske	Chevrolet-Ilmor	50	200 (321.868)	1:41:20	118.408	Report
1994	Sep 11	(Canada) Jacques Villeneuve	Forsythe/Green Racing (2)	Reynard	Ford-Cosworth	50	200 (321.868)	1:42:37	116.922	Report
1995	July 9	(Canada) Jacques Villeneuve (2)	Team Green	Reynard	Ford-Cosworth	50	200 (321.868)	1:55:29	103.901	Report
1996	Aug 18	(United States) Michael Andretti (3)	Newman/Haas Racing (6)	Lola	Ford-Cosworth	50	200 (321.868)	1:56:33	102.947	Report
1997	Aug 17	(Italy) Alex Zanardi	Chip Ganassi Racing	Reynard	Honda	50	202.4 (325.731)	1:57:54	102.995	Report
1998	Aug 16	(United Kingdom) Dario Franchitti	Team KOOL Green (2)	Reynard	Honda	50	202.4 (325.731)	1:35:30	127.145	Report
1999	July 11	(Brazil) Christian Fittipaldi	Newman/Haas Racing (7)	Swift	Ford-Cosworth	55	222.64 (358.304)	1:37:00	137.697	Report
2000	Aug 20	(Canada) Paul Tracy (2)	Team Green (3)	Reynard	Honda	55	222.64 (358.304)	1:37:53	136.457	Report
2001	Aug 19	(Brazil) Bruno Junqueira	Chip Ganassi Racing (2)	Lola	Toyota	45*	182.16 (293.158)	2:00:28	90.721	Report
2002	Aug 18	(Brazil) Cristiano da Matta	Newman/Haas Racing (8)	Lola	Toyota	60	242.88 (390.877)	1:56:43	124.856	Report
2003	Aug 3	(Brazil) Bruno Junqueira (2)	Newman/Haas Racing (9)	Lola	Ford-Cosworth	34*	137.632 (221.497)	1:35:28	86.493	Report
2004	Aug 8	(Canada) Alex Tagliani	Rocketsports	Lola	Ford-Cosworth	48*	194.304 (312.701)	1:45:07	110.903	Report
2005	Not held									
2006	Sep 23	(United States) A. J. Allmendinger	Forsythe Racing (3)	Lola	Ford-Cosworth	51	206.448 (332.245)	1:54:43	107.967	Report
2007	Aug 12	(France) Sébastien Bourdais	Newman/Haas/Lanigan Racing (10)	Panoz	Cosworth	53	214.544 (345.275)	1:40:58	127.481	Report
2008 – 2015	Not held									
IndyCar Series
2016	Jun 26	(Australia) Will Power	Team Penske (4)	Dallara	Chevrolet	50	202.4 (325.731)	1:39:10	121.426	Report
2017	Jun 25	(New Zealand) Scott Dixon	Chip Ganassi Racing (3)	Dallara	Honda	55	222.64 (358.304)	1:47:19	123.431	Report
2018	Jun 24	(United States) Josef Newgarden	Team Penske (5)	Dallara	Chevrolet	55	222.64 (358.304)	1:40:16	132.101	Report
2019	Jun 23	(United States) Alexander Rossi	Andretti Autosport	Dallara	Honda	55	222.64 (358.304)	1:39:40	132.894	Report
2020	July 11	(New Zealand) Scott Dixon (2)	Chip Ganassi Racing (4)	Dallara	Honda	55	222.64 (358.304)	1:54:09	116.027	Report
2020	July 12	(Sweden) Felix Rosenqvist	Chip Ganassi Racing (5)	Dallara	Honda	55	222.64 (358.304)	1:51:22	118.942	Report
2021	Jun 20	(Spain) Álex Palou	Chip Ganassi Racing (6)	Dallara	Honda	55	222.64 (358.304)	1:50:55	119.424	Report
2022	Jun 12	(United States) Josef Newgarden (2)	Team Penske (6)	Dallara	Chevrolet	55	222.64 (358.304)	1:53:02	117.174	Report
2023	Jun 18	(Spain) Álex Palou (2)	Chip Ganassi Racing (7)	Dallara	Honda	55	220.55 (354.94)	1:50:04	120.335	Report
2024	Jun 9	(Australia) Will Power (2)	Team Penske (7)	Dallara	Chevrolet	55	220.55 (354.94)	1:45:00	126.154	Report
2025	Jun 22	(Spain) Álex Palou (3)	Chip Ganassi Racing (8)	Dallara	Honda	55	220.55 (354.94)	1:53:30	116.696	Report
2026	Jun 21	(Denmark) Christian Lundgaard	Arrow McLaren	Dallara	Chevrolet	55	220.55 (354.94)	1:51:06	119.220	Report

- 1986: Race started on September 21 but stopped after 3 laps due to rain. The remainder of the race ran on October 4.
- 2001 & 2004: Race shortened due to time limit.
- 2003: Race shortened due to darkness after 2 rain delays.
- 2020: Race postponed and was made into a doubleheader

=== Support race winners ===
Atlantic Championship
Season	Date	Winning driver
1978	July 23	(United States) Howdy Holmes
1979	July 22	(United States) Bob Earl
1980	July 19	(United States) Bob Earl
1981	July 26	(United States) Whitney Ganz
1982	July 24	(United States) John David Briggs
1983	July 16	(Brazil) Roberto Moreno
1986	July 26	(Canada) Scott Goodyear
1987	August 29	(United States) Ted Prappas
1988	July 17	(United States) Colin Trueman
1989	September 10	(Canada) Claude Bourbonnais
1990	September 23	(United States) Jimmy Vasser
1996	August 17	(Canada) Patrick Carpentier
1997	August 17	(United States) Alex Barron
1998	August 16	(United States) Anthony Lazzaro
1999	July 11	(Canada) Andrew Bordin
2000	August 20	(United States) Buddy Rice
2001	August 19	(Brazil) Hoover Orsi
2002	August 18	(Mexico) Luis Díaz
2004	August 8	(United Kingdom) Ryan Dalziel
2005	August 21	(Estonia) Tõnis Kasemets
2006	September 24	(United States) Jonathan Bomarito
2007	August 12	(France) Franck Perera
2008	August 9	(United States) Jonathan Bomarito
2008	August 10	(United States) Jonathan Summerton

American Racing Series
Season	Date	Winning driver
1986	September 20	(United States) Mike Groff
1988	September 11	(Argentina) Juan Manuel Fangio II
1989	September 10	(Republic of Ireland) Tommy Byrne
1990	September 23	(Canada) Paul Tracy
1991 – 2015	Not held	
Indy Lights
2016	June 25	(United States) Zach Veach
2016	June 26	(Uruguay) Santiago Urrutia
2017	June 24	(Brazil) Matheus Leist
2017	June 25	(Canada) Zachary Claman DeMelo
2018	June 23	(United States) Colton Herta
2018	June 24	(Brazil) Victor Franzoni
2019	June 22	(United States) Ryan Norman
2019	June 23	(Netherlands) Rinus VeeKay
2020	Not held	
2021	June 19	(United States) Kyle Kirkwood
2021	June 20	(United States) David Malukas
2022	June 12	(Denmark) Christian Rasmussen
Indy NXT
2023	June 18	(United States) Nolan Siegel
2024	June 9	(United Kingdom) Jamie Chadwick
2025	June 22	(Brazil) Caio Collet
2026	June 20	(Australia) Lochie Hughes
2026	June 21	(Italy) Matteo Nannini

Star Mazda Championship
Season	Date	Winning driver
2002	July 6	(United States) Guy Cosmo
2003	August 23	(United States) Michael McDowell
2004	August 21	(United States) Michael McDowell
2005	August 20	(Canada) James Hinchcliffe
2006	August 19	(United States) Ron White
2007	August 11	(United States) Ron White
2008	August 9	(Republic of Ireland) Peter Dempsey
2009 – 2015	Not held	
Pro Mazda Championship
2016	June 25	(United States) Aaron Telitz
2016	June 25	(United States) Aaron Telitz
2017	June 25	(Brazil) Victor Franzoni
2017	June 26	(Australia) Anthony Martin
2018	June 23	(United States) David Malukas
2018	June 24	(United States) David Malukas
Indy Pro 2000 Championship
2019	June 22	(United States) Kyle Kirkwood
2019	June 23	(United States) Kyle Kirkwood
2020	July 10	(Singapore) Danial Frost
2020	July 10	(Russia) Artem Petrov
2021	June 19	(Mexico) Manuel Sulaimán
2021	June 20	(Denmark) Christian Rasmussen
2022	June 11	(United Kingdom) Louis Foster
2022	June 12	(United States) Braden Eves
USF Pro 2000 Championship
2023	June 17	(United States) Michael d'Orlando
2023	June 18	(Albania) Lirim Zendeli
2024	June 7	(Australia) Lochie Hughes
2024	June 8	(Australia) Lochie Hughes
2024	June 9	(Australia) Lochie Hughes
2025	June 21	(United States) Max Garcia
2025	June 21	(United States) Max Garcia
2025	June 22	(United States) Max Taylor
2026	June 20	(United States) G3 Argyros
2026	June 21	(United States) G3 Argyros

Formula Ford 2000
Season	Date	Winning driver
1993	July 11	(United States) Chris Simmons
1994 – 1999	Not held	
2000	July 8	(United States) Aaron Justus
2000	July 9	(Canada) Marc-Antoine Camirand
2001	July 8	(Estonia) Tõnis Kasemets
2001	July 8	(Estonia) Tõnis Kasemets
2002	Not held	
2003	August 2	(United States) Charlie Kimball
2003	August 3	(United States) Charlie Kimball
2004	August 21	(United States) Bobby Wilson
2004	August 22	(United States) Jason Bowles
2005	August 6	(United Kingdom) Joey Foster
2005	August 7	(United Kingdom) Jay Howard
2006	September 23	(United States) Dane Cameron
2006	September 24	(United States) J. R. Hildebrand
2006 – 2010	Not held	
U.S. F2000 National Championship
2010	August 21	(United States) Sage Karam
2010	August 22	(United States) Sage Karam
2011	August 19	(United States) Spencer Pigot
2011	August 20	(Finland) Petri Suvanto
2012	August 17	(New Zealand) Matthew Brabham
2012	August 17	(New Zealand) Matthew Brabham
2012	August 18	(United States) Scott Anderson
2013 – 2015	Not held	
2016	June 25	(Australia) Anthony Martin
2016	June 25	(Australia) Anthony Martin
2017	June 23	(Netherlands) Rinus VeeKay
2017	June 24	(Netherlands) Rinus VeeKay
2018	June 23	(United States) Kyle Kirkwood
2018	June 24	(United States) Kyle Kirkwood
2019	June 22	(New Zealand) Hunter McElrea
2019	June 23	(United States) Braden Eves
2020	July 10	(Denmark) Christian Rasmussen
2020	July 10	(Denmark) Christian Rasmussen
2021	June 19	(Brazil) Kiko Porto
2021	June 20	(Canada) Thomas Nepveu
2022	June 11	(United States) Jace Denmark
2022	June 11	(United States) Michael d'Orlando
2023	June 17	(United States) Simon Sikes
2023	June 18	(Australia) Lochie Hughes
2024	June 8	(United States) Sam Corry
2024	June 9	(Australia) Max Taylor
2025	June 21	(United States) Thomas Schrage
2025	June 21	(United States) Teddy Musella
2026	June 20	(Australia) Eddie Beswick
2026	June 20	(Canada) Anthony Martella
2026	June 21	(Australia) Brad Majman

== Race summaries ==
=== CART PPG Indy Car World Series ===
- 1982: The first CART Indy car race at Road America saw a wild second half and a surprise winner. Mario Andretti and Bobby Rahal battled for the lead early in the first half. Andretti eventually pulled out to a 28-second lead until gearbox problems put him out on lap 29. Rahal took the lead on lap 30, and was leading when rain began to fall on lap 38. With Al Unser Sr. and rookie Héctor Rebaque in second and third, Rahal shockingly ran out of fuel on lap 45. Unser took the lead, but he too was low on fuel. Unser ran out of fuel on the final lap just after taking the white flag. Rebaque led the final lap and scored his first and only win in Indy car competition. Polesitter Rick Mears ran a steady fifth, and secured enough points to clinch the 1982 CART Championship.
- 1983: Josele Garza's car failed to crank on the grid due to a faulty kill switch. He joined the field dead last, and charged to fourth place by lap 38. In spectacular fashion, Garza passed Mario Andretti, Bobby Rahal, and Al Unser Jr. to take the lead on lap 40. Unser Jr. went to the grass as Garza passed him, causing Andretti and Rahal to take evasive action. Four laps later, however, Garza spun out, handing the lead to Rahal. For the second year in a row Rahal was in sight of victory, but ran low on fuel, this time dropping out on lap 47. Mario Andretti, despite clutch and gearbox issues, took the victory, his first in Indy car competition since 1981.
- 1984: Mario Andretti won the pole position, led 34 of the 50 laps, and dominated the race to win for the second consecutive year. Andretti's nearest competitors all suffered trouble, allowing Andretti to cruise to victory. Danny Sullivan suffered an engine fire, Bobby Rahal experienced fuel pickup problems, and Roberto Guerrero twice spun off course. Andretti won by a margin of over 1 minute and 14 seconds and the race went caution-free. Tom Sneva led the points standings going into the race, but blew an engine on lap 33. Andretti took over the points lead, and would go on to win the 1984 CART championship.
- 1985: Al Unser Jr. took the lead on lap 16 and was leading the race when rain started falling on lap 35. Unser Jr. was headed for the pits to put on rain tires, but lost control in the wet conditions and crashed in turn 13. Unser suffered a fractured ankle and wound up 17th. Jacques Villeneuve took the lead on lap 37, but moments later spun out in turn 5. He kept the engine running, and pulled away without losing the lead. Villeneuve led the final 14 laps to score his first and only Indy car win. It was the second time in four years a driver had scored their first career win at Road America. Substituting for the injured Mario Andretti, Alan Jones finished third, his one and only Indy car start.
- 1986: The race was scheduled for Sunday September 21. Morning rain made the track damp, but the race was started on time with all cars utilizing rain tires. Just seconds after the green flag fell, a huge downpour flooded the track and brought visibility down to near zero. Al Unser Jr. and Raul Boesel crashed in turn 11, Roberto Guerrero spun out, and Dominic Dobson hit a guardrail. Officials red flagged the race on lap 3, and postponed the resumption for Saturday October 4. After the two-week delay, the race picked up on lap 3. A light rain and cold temperatures made for difficult conditions. Of the 23 cars that restarted the race, 19 were involved in crashes or spins. Danny Sullivan was leading the race on lap 32 when he spun out in turn 5. Moments later, the yellow came out for a heavy rain shower. Eighth place runner Emerson Fittipaldi quickly ducked into the pits for fuel. As the rest of the field shuffled through pits stops during the yellow, Fittipaldi, Roberto Moreno, and Jacques Villeneuve, moved to the front of the field. Moreno and Villeneuve dueled for the lead until they collided on lap 44. Fittipaldi drove by to take the win, his first Indy car win on a road course. Michael Andretti charged on the final restart from sixth place, and tried to pass for the lead on the final lap, but Fittipaldi held him off by 0.33 seconds.
- 1987: Mario Andretti won the pole position and led all 50 laps en route to victory. It was Andretti's third win at Road America. Geoff Brabham finished second in the Judd AV machine, 41 seconds behind.
- 1988: Front row starters and Penske teammates Danny Sullivan and Rick Mears both ran out of fuel on the track, as did Al Unser Jr. later on, putting all three of those drivers out of contention. Emerson Fittipaldi dominated the race, and won over second place Bobby Rahal by 9 seconds. Third place finisher Mario Andretti ran out of fuel on the cool down lap.
- 1989: Michael Andretti led Danny Sullivan in the closing laps, but both cars were running low on fuel. With two laps to go, Sullivan ducked into the pits for a splash-and-go stop for fuel only. Andretti stayed out and held a 7-second lead at the white flag. Sullivan charged to catch Andretti, while Andretti was desperately conserving fuel. As they approached the Kink on the final lap, Andretti suddenly ran out of fuel. Sullivan dove to the grass to make the pass for the lead, and took the victory. Teo Fabi limped across the finish line, running out of fuel as he finished second. Michael Andretti dropped to 6th. Mario Andretti, who also ran out of fuel on the final lap, dropped from 5th to 7th.
- 1990: A. J. Foyt lost his brakes going into turn one on lap 26, and went off the course, crashing through an embankment and into a ravine. Foyt suffered serious injuries to his legs and feet, and would require months of rehabilitation. After a lengthy red flag, Danny Sullivan was the leader of the race, with Michael Andretti second, and Emerson Fittipaldi third. Suddenly, on lap 39 Sullivan's gearbox failed, putting Michael Andretti into the lead. Andretti held off Fittipaldi over the final ten laps to win for the first time at Road America.
- 1991: Michael Andretti held a 19-second lead over Al Unser Jr. with two laps to go. Andretti ducked into the pits for a splash-and-go stop for fuel, and shockingly came out of the pits just ahead of Unser who was flying down the frontstretch to catch him. The two cars were nose-to-tail with a lap and a half to go when a light rain shower doused the track. Unser's car got loose in the wet conditions, and he nearly spun out in the carousel. Unser backed off the fight and Andretti held on for the victory.
- 1992: Paul Tracy qualified for the pole position, his first career pole in Indy car racing, and the 100th Indy car pole position for Penske Racing, but suffered a huge crash moments later. The car went off course in turn 13, went airborne, then crashed head on into two guardrails. Tracy was unhurt. Emerson Fittipaldi led 41 of the 50 laps, but in the closing laps it was a three-car battle for the lead. Fittipaldi led Al Unser Jr. and Bobby Rahal across the finish line. The first three cars were separated by only 1.093 seconds.
- 1993: Paul Tracy won the pole position for the second year in a row, but again suffered a serious practice crash. Tracy raced with a sore ankle, a sore neck, and bruises on his legs and feet. Tracy led 49 of the 50 laps, and beat second place Nigel Mansell by 27 seconds.
- 1994: CART series rookie Jacques Villeneuve started on the front row and won his first career Indy car victory. Paul Tracy was leading his Penske teammate Al Unser Jr. and Villeneuve when a caution came out on lap 31. On the lap 36 restart, Villeneuve made a daring pass down to the inside to pass both Unser and Tracy going into turn one. Tracy bumped Villeneuve, and then Villeneuve and Unser touched, but all three cars raced away unscathed. Tracy blew his engine on lap 44, and Villeneuve drove to victory. Al Unser Jr.'s second-place finish was enough to clinch the 1994 CART championship.
- 1995: Jacques Villeneuve started from the pole and led 46 of the 50 laps for a dominating victory. A slippery track saw many cars go off-course, but no serious crashes. Villeneuve became the third driver to win back to back races at Road America.
- 1996: A wild race from start to finish. On the opening lap, polesitter Alex Zanardi touched wheels with Gil de Ferran in turn two. Zanardi slid into the grass, and de Ferran slid through a sand barrier. André Ribeiro was involved in two major incidents. On lap 14, he collided with Greg Moore, sending Moore hard into a concrete barrier, then sliding fast into a tire barrier. Six laps later, Ribeiro was battling Mark Blundell, the two cars bumped, and Maurício Gugelmin tried to pass them. He touched wheels with Gugelmin's car, and Gugelmin cut across and took out Blundell. Under a full-course yellow, Davy Jones lost control, hit a tire barrier, and the car flipped over. Parker Johnstone also went off course and flipped over. Al Unser Jr. was leading the race on the final lap when he blew his engine with two corners remaining. Michael Andretti inherited the win, holding off Bobby Rahal at the finish line.
- 1997: Heavy rain delayed the start by two hours, and soaked the track. At the start, Gualter Salles spun at the exit of turn one, and clipped wheels with Paul Tracy. Tracy's car spun and rammed into a tire barrier, landing upside-down. Mark Blundell led the race early with Alex Zanardi in second. On lap 36, Blundell and Zanardi pitted for fuel under a caution. Zanardi had the faster pit stop, and came out of the pits first to take the lead. Zanardi led the final 15 laps, with Blundell close behind until his engine blew with two laps to go.

=== CART FedEx Championship series ===
- 1998: Swift pit work during the second round of pit stops put Dario Franchitti in the lead on lap 30. Franchitti took the lead from polesitter Michael Andretti, and led the rest of the way. Andretti lost second place on the final lap when he blew a tire and crashed hard in turn 3. It was Franchitti's first career Indy car win, and the first win for car owner Barry Green since 1995. Bryan Herta narrowly escaped injury after spinning out on lap 10, and Alex Barron crashed and landed on top of his car.
- 1999: The race was lengthened from 50 to 55 laps. Juan Pablo Montoya led 46 laps, but suffered a broken gearbox with only seven laps to go. Christian Fittipaldi took the lead and won his first-career CART series race.
- 2000: Paul Tracy started seventh, but an electrical glitch shut the engine off on the first lap. He was able to get the engine restarted, but dropped to the tail end of the field. Without the benefit of a full course caution, Tracy remarkably charged back to the front of the field. Tracy took the lead on lap 38 after Alex Tagliani suffered a seized gearbox. Tracy ran out of fuel on the cool down lap and had to be towed to victory lane.
- 2001: Rain on Saturday and Sunday morning left the track drenched with standing water. Down the backstretch toward Canada Corner, a steady stream of runoff water was cascading over the track. The race was started as scheduled, but on lap 5 Max Wilson crashed over top of Bryan Herta. The red flag was put out on lap 14, and the race would be shortened to 45 laps due to the two-hour time limit. Michael Andretti attempted to pass Christian Fittipaldi for the lead in turn five with nine laps remaining, but the two cars collided and slid high. Bruno Junqueira slipped by both cars, and drove to victory - his first in the CART series. Memo Gidley survived a horrendous crash when his car hit one of the bridge abutments.
- 2002: The race distance was lengthened for the second time, to 60 laps (240 miles). Cristiano da Matta took the lead on lap 39 during a sequence of pit stops, and led to the finish. It was de Matta's sixth victory of the season, and broke a three-race slump. It served as an important turning point towards winning the 2002 CART championship.
- 2003: A dispute between the series officials and the promoters nearly cancelled the race. However, Mario Andretti stepped in as a mediator, and the race was reinstated. Rain delayed the race twice, including a two and a half hour red flag. Ultimately, the race was shortened from 60 laps to 34 laps due to darkness. Bruno Junqueira took the lead from the pole position and led all 34 laps to win. Only 19 laps were run under green flag conditions. Points leader Paul Tracy spun out on lap 11, and was unable to continue.

=== Champ Car World Series ===
- 2004: Alex Tagliani started 13th and gambled on track position by pitting under green early in the race. The gamble paid off as a caution came out on lap 12, allowing Tagliani to shuffle closer to the front of the field. A controversial restart on lap 14 saw race leader Sébastien Bourdais held up behind the pace car, allowing second place Paul Tracy to get the jump going into turn one. The two cars touched, causing a bent suspension on Bourdais' car. In the closing laps, Alex Tagliani passed Rodolfo Lavín to take the win, his first Champ Car victory. The race was shortened from 52 laps to 48 laps due to a 1:45 time limit.
- 2006: The race returned after a one-year absence. In the closing laps, Sébastien Bourdais was leading Bruno Junqueira and A. J. Allmendinger. Bourdais was looking to win the race and clinch his third straight Champ Car championship, but he needed one final pit stop. With 7 laps to go, Bourdais ducked into the pits, and came out on the track just ahead of Allmendinger. But going into turn five, Allmendinger made the pass for the lead and pulled away. Just moments later, Katherine Legge suffered a violent crash near the Kink. The car lost part of the rear wing, sending the car into a spin and to the concrete wall at about 180 mph. The car flipped into the catch fence, broke apart, then tumbled down the track. Legge was not seriously injured, but the race was red-flagged for 42 minutes to clean up the incident. The race resumed for a two-lap sprint to the finish. A. J. Allmendinger pulled away, and Bruno Junqueira came home second.
- 2007: After coming close three previous times, Sébastien Bourdais finally won at Road America. Bourdais had just announced he was departing Champ Car at the end of the season to join Scuderia Toro Rosso in Formula One for 2008. Bourdais led 51 of the 53 laps. His closest competitors Robert Doornbos and Will Power both suffered trouble, allowing Bourdais to overpower the field. It would end up being the final Champ Car race at Road America.
- 2008: The 2008 race was scheduled for August 10, but was cancelled in the wake of the open-wheel unification.

=== IndyCar Series ===
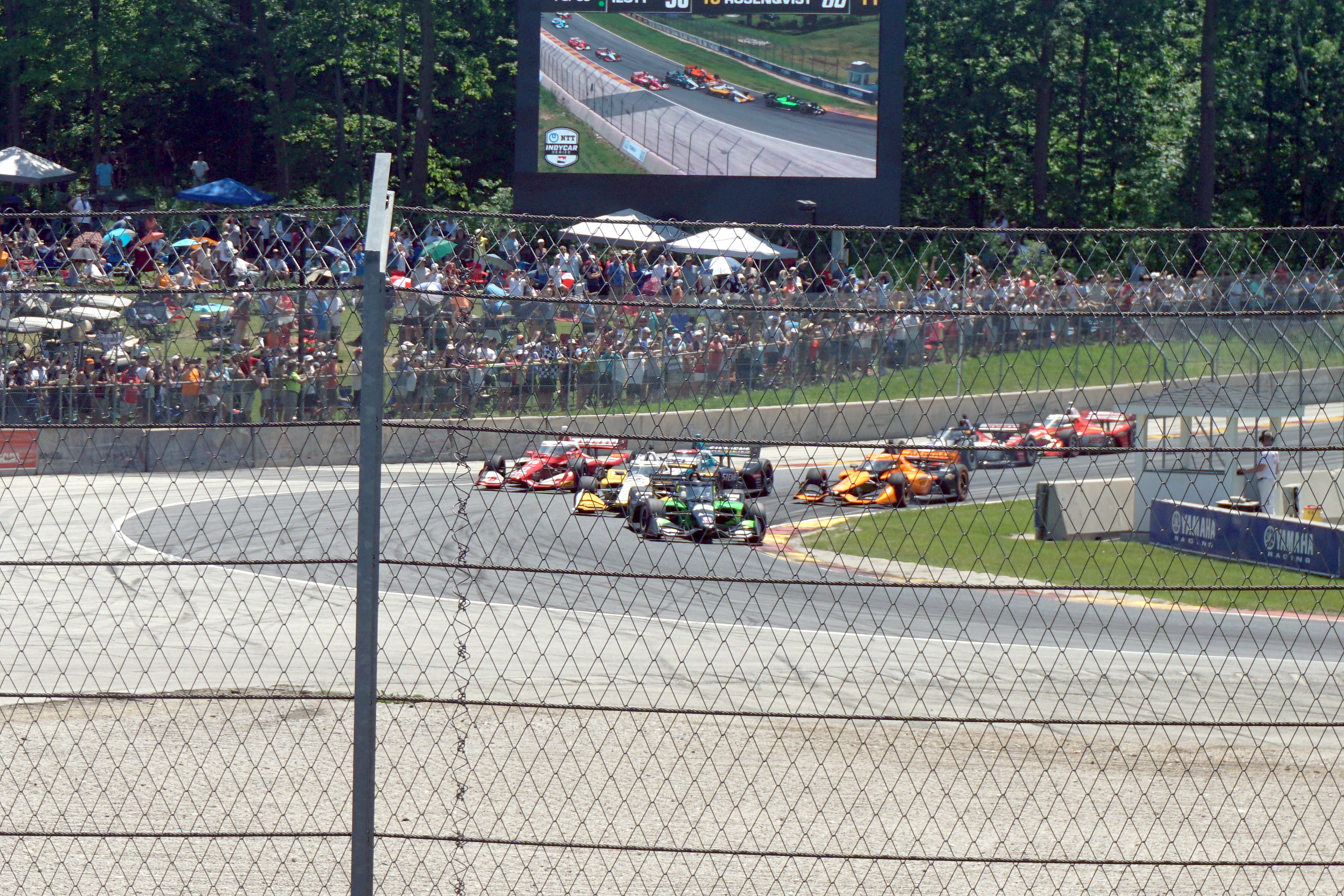
In-race action from 2025

- 2016: After a hiatus of eight years, Road America returns to the open wheel schedule as part of the IndyCar Series. Will Power won the pole position, beating out Scott Dixon and Tony Kanaan. Championship leader Simon Pagenaud qualified fourth. Dixon would drop out on lap 7 with engine failure. Power would lead most of the race, with Kanaan, Graham Rahal, and Pagenaud all battling for second. On lap 40, the only caution period came out after the rear suspension on Conor Daly's car failed, sending him off course and into the wall in turn one. On the restart on lap 44, Power held his lead, while Kanaan took second. Pagenaud dropped in the standings with a misfire, and Power held on to win.
- 2017: Hélio Castroneves started on the pole and took the lead at the start. Josef Newgarden took second position. The race saw some teams elect to use a four pit stop strategy, while others chose a three-stop strategy. After the first round of stops, Castroneves held a narrow lead over Newgarden, with Scott Dixon third. On lap 20, Newgarden passed Castroneves for the lead and began to pull away. Takuma Sato brought out the first yellow after a spin and contact in turn 11 on lap 29. On the ensuing restart, Dixon swung to the outside of Newgarden through turn 1 and grabbed the lead. Castroneves moved past Newgarden a few turns later. After the final round of pit stops, Dixon maintained his lead, while Newgarden was able to move past Castroneves to take back second. The second caution came after Tony Kanaan crashed in turn 11 after breaking his front wing in an attempt to pass Alexander Rossi. After one final restart, Dixon drove to victory, holding off Newgarden in second.
- 2018: Josef Newgarden started on the pole and led 53 of the 55 laps to victory. Though Newgarden dominated most of the race up front, the battle among the rest of the top five was heated all day. Ryan Hunter-Reay and Alexander Rossi took second and third at the start, battling much of the race, although Rossi would suffer a late tire puncture and a disappointing 16th-place finish. On the final round of pit stops, running third, Scott Dixon pitted on lap 42, while leader Newgarden and second place Hunter-Reay pitted a lap later on lap 43. Dixon on warmer tires went on a charge to try and catch the leaders while they pitted. The leaders managed to come out just ahead of Dixon, and a bobble by Dixon in turn 14, allowed them to hold off his challenge. Hunter-Reay finished second, and Dixon third.
- 2019: Rookie Colton Herta started on the pole, but Alexander Rossi grabbed the lead at the start. Rossi dominated the race, leading 54 of the 55 laps, and won by a commanding margin of 28.4391 seconds over second place Will Power. Rossi gave up the lead only once for one lap during his final pit stop. The race went caution-free with only one car dropping out, Marco Andretti, with mechanical problems. Polesitter Herta finished 8th.
- 2020 (Saturday): Due to the COVID-19 pandemic, the race was rescheduled from June 21 to the weekend of July 11–12, and became a doubleheader. In the first race, polesitter Josef Newgarden led 25 of the first 27 laps, but stalled his engine during a pit stop on 28. He fell back and would finish 14th. Will Power inherited the lead on lap 30. A full-course caution on lap 38 brought Power to the pits, where he too suffered problems. Power's crew had trouble dropping the jack, which allowed Scott Dixon to take the lead. Dixon led the final sixteen laps, scoring his third straight IndyCar win to start the 2020 season.
- 2020 (Sunday): The second race of the doubleheader saw Patricio O'Ward start from the pole position. At the start, Will Power made contact with the back of Ryan Hunter-Reay's car, which sent Hunter-Reay spinning and crashing in turn one. Then in turn three, Power made contact side by side with Graham Rahal. Rahal lost control and spun to the grass, making hard contact with a concrete barrier. Then on lap 6, Power would spin out on his own in turn 13, bringing out the second of two yellows. Power recovered to finish 11th after placing second on Saturday. O'Ward dominated most of the race, leading 43 laps, and pulling out to as much as a 9-second lead at one point. O'Ward and Felix Rosenqvist were running 1st-2nd when they made the final pits stops on laps 41 and 43, respectively. O'Ward, running the alternate red tires, held about a 5-second lead with ten laps to go. Rosenqvist began closing the gap, as O'Ward's tires were beginning to go away. Rosenqvist caught O'Ward with two laps to go, and the two cars battled side by side into turn 6 on lap 54. Rosenqvist took the lead, and led the final two laps to score his first career IndyCar win.
- 2021: Josef Newgarden secured his second consecutive pole, achieving the unlikely feat of qualifying on pole with harder compound primary tires. Newgarden let Alex Palou, Colton Herta, and Will Power for most of the race before his gearbox gave out on the third to last lap, handing the victory to Palou.
- 2022: Alexander Rossi qualified on pole. After an early series of cautions Josef Newgarden beat Rossi off pit road in the first series of green flag pit stops. Newgarden would dominate the race from that point on, holding the lead despite some late cautions. Reigning Indianapolis 500 champion Marcus Ericsson took second while Rossi rounded out the podium.
- 2023: Colton Herta qualified on pole. Herta led throughout the majority of the race before his team made a critical mistake on the last pitstop, pitting a lap earlier than the rest of the leaders. This forced Herta into a fuel save for the remainder of the race. Alex Palou overtook Herta for the race lead with seven laps to go and won the race with a commanding lead. Herta faded from the front and allowed Josef Newgarden and Pato O'Ward to take second and third place respectively.
- 2024: Linus Lundqvist qualified on pole, earning his first IndyCar pole position. Lundqvist lost the lead on the first lap after being rear ended by his teammate Marcus Armstrong and spun out in the first corner. After Lundqvist and Armstrong's incident, Kyle Kirkwood and Scott McLaughlin traded the lead until Lap 17, when the first green flag pit stops were made. From then on it became a Team Penske 1–2–3, with McLaughlin and Josef Newgarden trading the lead based on further green flag pit stops around lap 32. Newgarden, who had started the race on the softer alternate tires, was able to get primaries in his second pitstop while McLaughlin and Will Power had to take alternates. On lap 42, McLaughlin pitted to get off the alternate tires while Newgarden and Power stayed out. This proved to be detrimental to Newgarden, as he was caught by the lapped car of Nolan Siegel and was forced to pit to get clean air on the next lap while Power stayed out. On lap 44 Power made his final pitstop and successfully executed an overcut. Having conserved his push to pass throughout, Power held onto the lead for the remainder of the race and won with a commanding lead, ending a nearly two year long winless streak. Josef Newgarden and Scott McLaughlin finished second and third respectively, giving Team Penske their first 1-2-3 finish in six years.

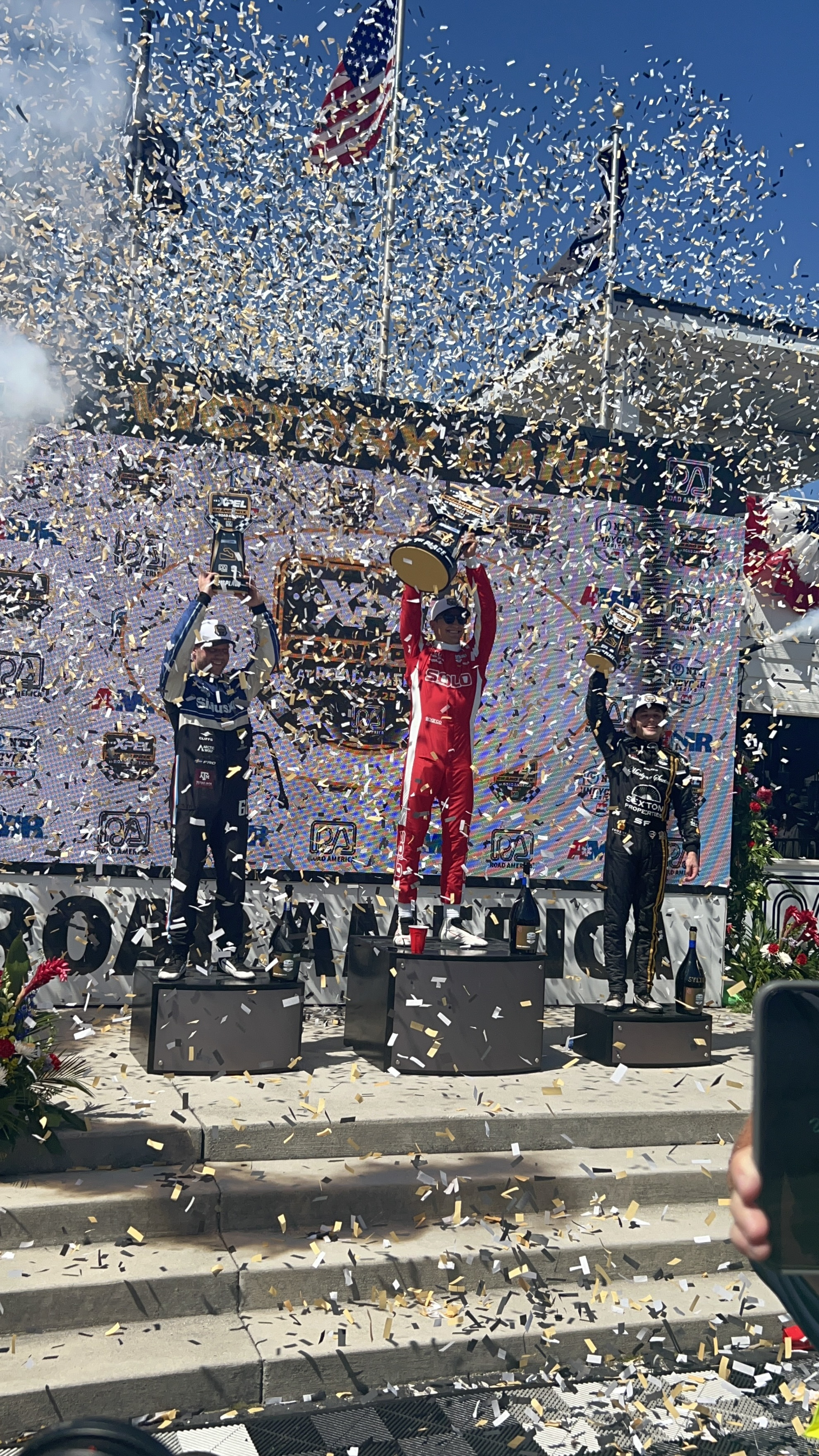
The podium from the 2025 event

- 2025: Louis Foster qualified on pole, earning his first IndyCar pole position. Foster lost the lead early on to Scott McLaughlin. Towards the end of the race, Chip Ganassi Racing teammates Scott Dixon and Álex Palou battled until Dixon needed to pit for fuel. Palou ended up winning the race.
- 2026: Defending race winner Álex Palou earned his fifth consecutive IndyCar pole position. He lead early on but was penalized for speeding in the pits. Felix Rosenqvist led most of the race but lost ground with an untimely caution. His teammate Marcus Armstrong was leading late in the race and on course for a maiden IndyCar victory, only for his engine to fail with three laps remaining. Christian Lundgaard picked up damage in an opening corner incident and dropped to the rear of the field, but worked his way through the pack to inherit the lead following Armstrong’s demise, and held off David Malukas over a two lap shootout for victory. On the final lap, Graham Rahal and Will Power collided battling for third place, putting Rahal in the wall whilst Power held on to the podium.

== Footnotes ==
=== Works cited ===
- UltimateRacingHistory.com - Road America
- RacingReference.info - Road America
- IndyCar.com - Road America

=== References ===
Preceded by Bommarito Automotive Group 500	IndyCar Series; Grand Prix of Road America	Succeeded by Indy 200 at Mid-Ohio
