= 2015 Atlantic Championship =

2015 Atlantic Championship Series season

Season
- Races: 15
- Start date: February 12
- End date: October 18

Awards

The 2015 Atlantic Championship Series season is the third season of the revived Atlantic Championship. The series was organised by Formula Race Promotions under the sanctioning of SCCA Pro Racing.

== Drivers and teams ==
Team	No.	Drivers	Chassis	Engine
(United States) Company Motorsports	19	(United States) Connor Burke	Swift 014.a	Toyota 4AGE
(United States) Company Motorsports	55	(United States) John Burke	Swift 016.a	Mazda-Cosworth MZR
(United States) Comprent Motorsports	17	(United States) Bob Corliss	Swift 014.a	Toyota 4AGE
(United States) Comprent Motorsports	66	(United States) Richard Zober	Swift 016.a	Mazda-Cosworth MZR
(United States) Comprent Motorsports	67	(United States) Chris Ash	Swift 016.a	Mazda-Cosworth MZR
(United States) K-Hill Motorsports	3	(United States) Mark Sherwood	Ralt RT41	Toyota 4AGE
(United States) K-Hill Motorsports	4	(United States) Bruce Crockett	Swift 014.a	Toyota 4AGE
(United States) K-Hill Motorsports	6	(United States) Bruce Hamilton	Swift 016.a	Mazda-Cosworth MZR
(United States) K-Hill Motorsports	36	(United States) Dudley Fleck	Swift 016.a	Mazda-Cosworth MZR
(United States) K-Hill Motorsports	47	(Germany) Keyvan Andres	Swift 016.a	Mazda-Cosworth MZR
(United States) K-Hill Motorsports	54	(United States) Mike Jacques	Swift 016.a	Mazda-Cosworth YDX
(United States) K-Hill Motorsports	56	(United States) Conner Kearby	Swift 014.a	Toyota 4AGE
(United States) K-Hill Motorsports	69	(United States) Gaston Kearby	Swift 016.a	Mazda-Cosworth MZR
(United States) Lochmoor Promotions	70	(United States) Lewis Cooper, Jr.	Swift 016.a	Toyota 4AGE
(United States) Polestar Racing Group	40	(United States) Keith Grant	Swift 016.a	Mazda-Cosworth MZR

== Race calendar and results ==
Round	Circuit	Location	Date	Pole position	Fastest lap	Winning driver
1	Winter Exhibition @ (Florida) Palm Beach International Raceway	(United States) Jupiter, Florida	February 14	(Estonia) Tõnis Kasemets	(Estonia) Tõnis Kasemets	(Estonia) Tõnis Kasemets
2	(Georgia (U.S. state)) Road Atlanta	(United States) Braselton, Georgia	April 11	(United States) Keith Grant	(United States) Keith Grant	(United States) Keith Grant
3	(Georgia (U.S. state)) Road Atlanta	(United States) Braselton, Georgia	April 12	(United States) Keith Grant	(United States) Keith Grant	(United States) Conner Kearby
4	(New York (state)) Watkins Glen International	(United States) Watkins Glen, New York	May 16	(United States) Conner Kearby	(United States) Keith Grant	(Germany) Keyvan Andres Soori
5	(New York (state)) Watkins Glen International	(United States) Watkins Glen, New York	May 17	(Germany) Keyvan Andres Soori	(United States) Keith Grant	(Germany) Keyvan Andres Soori
6	Virginia International Raceway	(United States) Alton, Virginia	June 6	(United States) Keith Grant	(United States) Garth Rickards	(Germany) Keyvan Andres Soori
7	Virginia International Raceway	(United States) Alton, Virginia	June 7	(United States) Keith Grant	(United States) Keith Grant	(United States) Keith Grant
8	Mid-Ohio Sports Car Course	(United States) Lexington, Ohio	July 4	(United States) Keith Grant	(United States) Conner Kearby	(United States) Conner Kearby
9	Mid-Ohio Sports Car Course	(United States) Lexington, Ohio	July 5	(United States) Keith Grant	(United States) Conner Kearby	(United States) Keith Grant
10	(Pennsylvania) Pittsburgh International Race Complex	(United States) Wampum, Pennsylvania	August 1	(United States) Keith Grant	(United States) Keith Grant	(United States) Keith Grant
11	(Pennsylvania) Pittsburgh International Race Complex	(United States) Wampum, Pennsylvania	August 2	(United States) Keith Grant	(United States) Keith Grant	(United States) Keith Grant
12	New Jersey Motorsports Park	(United States) Millville, New Jersey	August 29	(United States) Keith Grant	(Germany) Keyvan Andres Soori	(Germany) Keyvan Andres Soori
13	New Jersey Motorsports Park	(United States) Millville, New Jersey	August 30	(Germany) Keyvan Andres Soori	(Germany) Keyvan Andres Soori	(Germany) Keyvan Andres Soori
14	(Pennsylvania) Pittsburgh International Race Complex	(United States) Wampum, Pennsylvania	October 16	(United States) Keith Grant	(United States) Connor Burke	(United States) Garth Rickards
15	(Pennsylvania) Pittsburgh International Race Complex	(United States) Wampum, Pennsylvania	October 18	Cancelled	(Estonia) Tõnis Kasemets	(Estonia) Tõnis Kasemets

== Championship standings ==
Pos	Driver	(Florida) PBI	(Georgia (U.S. state)) ATL		(New York (state)) WGL		(Virginia) VIR		(Ohio) MOH		(Pennsylvania) PIT1		(New Jersey) NJMP		(Pennsylvania) PIT2		Points
1	(United States) Keith Grant		**1**	2	4	2	**3**	**1**	**10**	**1**	**1**	**1**	**2**	4	**3**	DNS	561
2	(United States) Conner Kearby		2	1	2	13	4	4	1	2	2	3	12	3	2	2	519
3	(United States) Gaston Kearby		4	3	5	15	12	5	2	3	3	2	5	5	6	4	446
4	(United States) Bob Corliss		11	4	14	10	8	8	6	10	7	5	8	10	8	6	345
5	(Germany) Keyvan Andres Soori				1	**1**	1	2				6	1	**1**			331
6	(United States) Garth Rickards				3	3	2	3					3	2	1	3	321
7	(United States) Richard Zober		3	9	9	5	5	13	DNS	6	4	7	4	11	5	7	303
8	(United States) Chris Ash		7	6	10	6	11	10	9		5	4	11	7			280
9	(United States) Lewis Cooper, Jr.	6	5	10	15	11	6	7	7	7					7	8	224
10	(United States) John Burke				8	7	7	9	4	8			10	DNS	DNS	5	213
11	(United States) Conner Burke				16	4	9	12	3	4			13		4	9	206
12	(United States) Bruce Hamilton	2	6	5	7	13	13	6					7	6			190
13	(United States) Andy Schaufelberger				13	8							6	8			94
14	(United States) Dudley Fleck				6	15			5	5							92
15	(United States) Mike Jacques	5	9	7	12	9											90
16	(United States) Brian Novak								8	9	6	DNS					77
17	(United States) Bruce Crockett		10	11	17	DNS	10	11									63
18	(Estonia) Tõnis Kasemets	**1**													10	1	53
19	(United States) J.R. Smart	3	8	8													50
20	(United States) Lee Brahin												9	9			46
21	(United States) Matt Miller														9	DNS	23
22	(United States) Mark Sherwood				11	16											20
-	(Canada) Ryan Verra	4															0
Pos	Driver	(Florida) PBI	(Georgia (U.S. state)) ATL		(New York (state)) WGL		(Virginia) VIR		(Ohio) MOH		(Pennsylvania) PIT1		(New Jersey) NJMP		(Pennsylvania) PIT2		Points

Color	Result
Gold	Winner
Silver	2nd place
Bronze	3rd place
Green	4th & 5th place
Light Blue	6th–10th place
Dark Blue	Finished (Outside Top 10)
Purple	Did not finish
Red	Did not qualify (DNQ)
Brown	Withdrawn (Wth)
Black	Disqualified (DSQ)
White	Did not start (DNS)
Blank	Did not participate (DNP)
Blank	Not competing

**In-line notation**
**Bold**	Pole position (3 points)
Italics	Ran fastest race lap (2 points)

This list only contains drivers who registered for the championship.

== See also ==
- 2015 F1600 Championship Series season
- 2015 F2000 Championship Series season
