= Adam Pecorari =

American racing driver

- Born: November 28, 1984 (age 41) Aston, Pennsylvania, U.S.
- Relatives: Robbie Pecorari (brother)

Previous series
- 2007, 2009 2006 2003–2004: American Le Mans Series; IMSA Lites; USF2000

Championship titles
- 2006: IMSA Lites

Adam Pecorari (born November 28, 1984, in Aston, Pennsylvania) is a former racing driver. Pecorari won races in the USF2000 and later competed in the Atlantic Championship, IMSA Lites and other series.

== Racing career ==
Pecorari was a successful kart racer with the World Karting Association and the International Kart Federation. Pecorari won his first IKF Grand National Championship in 1996. He scored two second places in the WKA championship in 1999 and 2001. Pecorari also competed in the Formula A class at the Junior Monaco Kart Cup.

For 2003, Pecorari joined Andersen Walko Racing in the USF2000 Ford Zetec championship. He scored one podium finish, at Mid-Ohio Sports Car Course, and finished seventh in the championship standings. Pecorari improved for 2004, as he won four races, three at Mid-Ohio and another at Road America. He finished third in the championship, behind teammate Andrew Prendeville. Pecorari also made two starts in the Atlantic Championship with Jensen Motorsport. His best result was a ninth place Circuit Gilles Villeneuve. Pecorari returned in the Atlantic Championship for one race in 2005, he retired with technical difficulties.

For 2006, Pecorari joined Cape Motorsports in the IMSA Lites L1 class. At Road Atlanta, Pecorari won the inaugural event of the series beating John Bender and Duncan Ende. Pecorari went on to win the championship in dominant fashion, winning nine out of ten races. His success in the IMSA Lites prototype class landed him a seat in the American Le Mans Series with Van der Steur Racing in the LMP2 class. Pecorari made his debut for the team at the 2006 Monterey Sports Car Championships. The team, with Pecorari, Gunnar van der Steur and Ben Devlin failed to finish the race. Pecorari returned for the 2007 Northeast Grand Prix. Pecorari finished the Radical SR9 in tenth place overall, seventh in class. This was the best result for Pecorari at Van der Steur Racing. At the 2009 Northeast Grand Prix, Pecorari and Van der Steur finished fifteenth overall, but third in class.

== Complete motorsports results ==
=== American Open-Wheel racing results ===
(key) (Races in bold indicate pole position, races in italics indicate fastest race lap)

==== Complete USF2000 National Championship results ====
Year	Entrant	1	2	3	4	5	6	7	8	9	10	11	12	13	14	15	16	Pos	Points
2003	Andersen Walko Racing	SEB1; 14	SEB2; 9	LRP1; 8	LRP1; 7	MOH1; 9	MOH2; 9	ROA1; 4	ROA2; 28	MOH3; 24	MOH4; 2	ATL1; 4	ATL2; 21					**7th**	**116**
2004	Andersen Walko Racing	SEB1; 2	SEB2; 4	ATL1; 16	ATL2; 7	LS1; 10	LS2; 7	MOS1; 2	MOS2; 4	**MOH1**; 17	MOH2; 1	**SON1**; 4	SON2; 5	**MOH3**; 1	**MOH4**; 1	**ROA1**; 1	ROA2; 4	**3rd**	**308**
2005	Andersen Walko Racing	ATL1	ATL2	MOH1	MOH2	CLE1	CLE2	ROA1	ROA2	MOH3; 6	MOH4; 28	VIR1	VIR2					**N.C.**	**N.C.**

==== Atlantic Championship ====
Year	Team	1	2	3	4	5	6	7	8	9	10	11	12	Rank	Points
2004	Jensen Motorsport	LBH	MTY	MIL	POR1	POR2	CLE	TOR	VAN	ROA	DEN	MTL; 9	LS; 14	**17th**	**21**
2005	Polestar Racing Group	LBH	MTY; 13	POR1	POR2	CLE1	CLE2	TOR	EDM	SJO	DEN	ROA	MTL	**25th**	**11**

==== Star Mazda Championship ====
Year	Team	1	2	3	4	5	6	7	8	9	10	11	12	Rank	Points
2007	Hickham Motorsports	SEB	HOU; DSQ	VIR	MMP	POR	CLE	TOR	RAM	TRR	MOS	RAT	LAG	**N.C.**	**N.C.**
