= Bob Beers (politician, born 1951) =

American politician

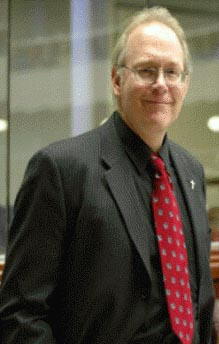
Former Nevada Assemblyman Beers

Bob L. Beers (born 1951) is an American politician who was a member of the Nevada Assembly representing District 21 in Clark County, Nevada. Prior to his election in 2006, he was an author involved in graphic arts and illustration.

Originally from Eureka, California, Beers attended Arcata High School and Humboldt State College. He currently resides in Henderson, Nevada with his wife and son.

== Political career ==
Beers was first elected to the Nevada Assembly in November 2006.

It was remarked that he won the Republican primary spending only $153.

As a Republican, he quickly generated controversy when he came to the aid of Nevada's tip-earning workers when Casino Mogul Steve Wynn instituted a program to retain 20% of his dealers' tips in violation of existing Nevada law.

The controversy over Assemblyman Beers' bill, AB357 created an atmosphere that culminated in the first ever dealers union being formed on a strip property. During a hearing on AB357, the vice president of the Las Vegas chapter of the NAACP stated an endorsement supporting Assemblyman Beers continuation as a Nevada legislator.

Other issues Assemblyman Beers took up included the creation of an Armed Services club at McCarran International Airport in Las Vegas. McCarran was the only airport of its size without such a facility. A USO facility was installed through the efforts of Harry Reid’s office after Assemblyman Beers created public awareness of the issue.

In 2008 Assemblyman Bob Beers was nominated to be a recipient of the JFK Profiles in Courage Award.

Born March 11, 1951, Beers is a recipient of the Bank of America Award in Art and was the Humboldt-Del Norte champion in the high hurdles in 1969.

In August 2008, Beers lost the 2008 Republican party primary to challenger Jon Ozark. Ozark eventually lost to Ellen Spiegel in the general election by 366 votes.

After leaving office, Bob Beers became a licensed mediator for the Nevada Supreme Court’s Foreclosure Mediation Program.

Currently Beers is working as a mediator, consultant and as a published author for the Australian Publisher Writers Exchange Epublishing where he is listed as one of their best-selling authors.
