= Derek Armstrong (politician) =

American politician (born 1980)

Derek Wayne Armstrong

Member of the Nevada Assembly from the 21st district
- In office November 5, 2014 – November 9, 2016
- Preceded by: Andy Eisen
- Succeeded by: Ozzie Fumo

Personal details
- Born: August 17, 1980 (age 46) Las Vegas, Nevada, Nevada, U.S.
- Party: Republican
- Education: University of Nevada, Las Vegas
- Profession: Lawyer and Accountant
- Website: Official website

Derek W. Armstrong (born August 17, 1980) is an American Republican politician and a former member of the Nevada Assembly representing District 21. He won the 2014 Republican primary against Andrew Coates. Armstrong defeated incumbent Andy Eisen. He lost reelection in 2016.

Armstrong is a lawyer and veteran of the United States Marine Corps.
