= Ryan Norman =

American racing driver (born 1998)

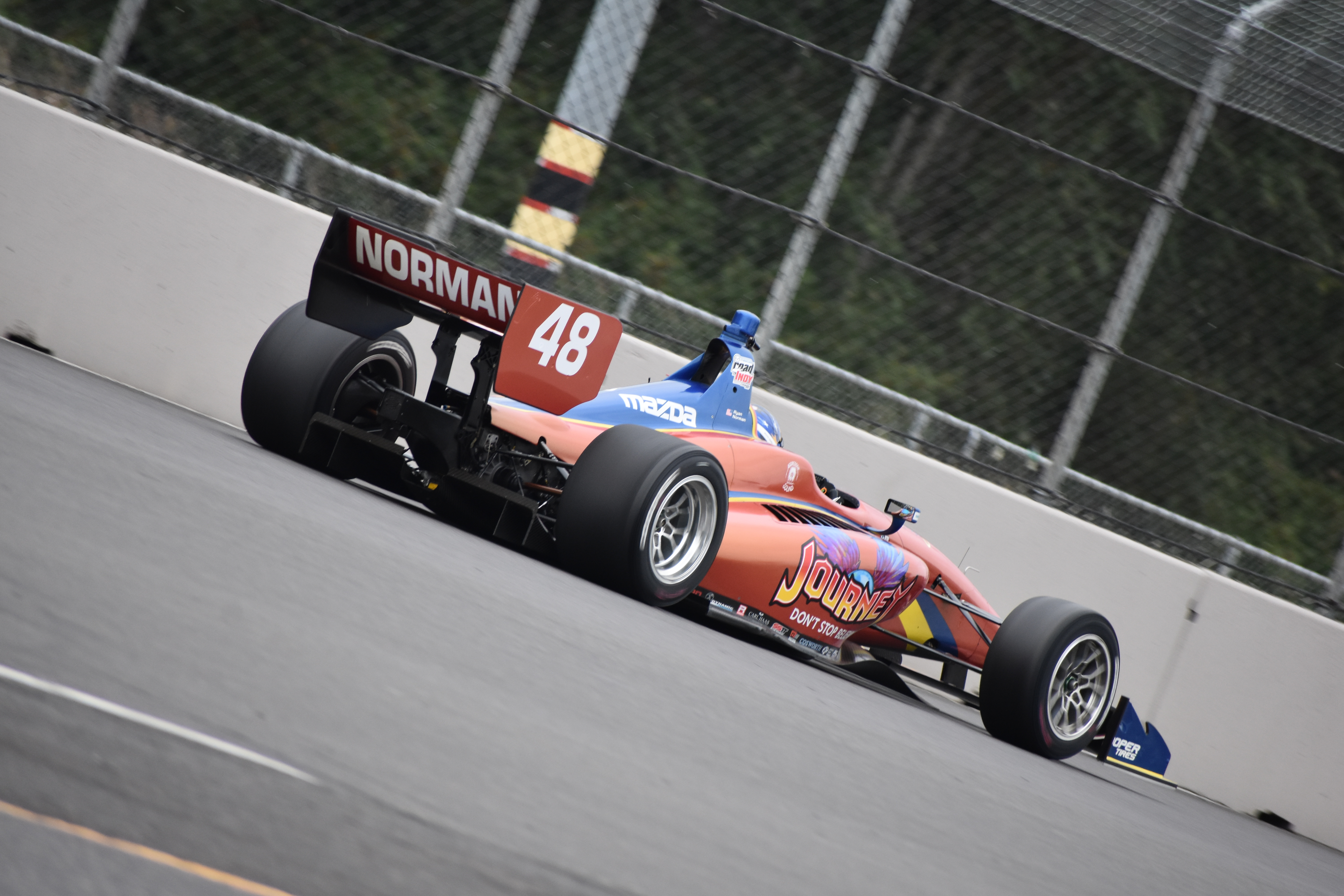
- Norman during Indy Lights qualifying at Portland in 2018
- Born: March 19, 1998 (age 28) Aurora, Ohio, U.S.

Michelin Pilot Challenge career
- Current team: Bryan Herta Autosport
- Categorisation: FIA Silver
- Car number: 88

Previous series
- 2016 2014-2015: Atlantic Championship; Formula Enterprises; Skip Barber Winter Series

Championship titles
- 2016 2020: Formula Atlantic Champion; IMSA Michelin Pilot TCR Champion

IndyCar Series career
- 1 race run over 1 year
- Team: No. 52 (Dale Coyne Racing)
- First race: 2021 Honda Indy 200 (Mid-Ohio)
- Last race: 2021 Honda Indy 200 (Mid-Ohio)
Wins	Podiums	Poles
0	0	0

Ryan Norman (born March 19, 1998, in Aurora, Ohio) is an American racing driver. Norman is a former motocross rider and is currently competing in the Michelin Pilot Challenge, driving for Bryan Herta Autosport and won the 2020 IMSA TCR Championship for the team. He formerly drove for Andretti Autosport in Indy Lights with multiple wins and podiums, and ran a race in the IndyCar Series in 2021 with Dale Coyne Racing.

== Career ==
Norman started in motocross when he obtained an AMA at the age of twelve. When turning sixteen Norman's father invited Ryan for a three-day course at the Skip Barber Racing School. Norman joined the Skip Barber Winter Series for the first two rounds of the championship. In November 2015, Norman finished seventh in his debut race, at Road Atlanta.

With driving coach Franklin Futrelle, Norman joined the SCCA Formula Enterprises class in 2015. In his debut season, Norman won the second race at Sebring International Raceway in the U.S. Majors Tour Southeastern Conference. After winning more races at Road Atlanta and Virginia International Raceway, he secured a second place finish in the championship. Comprent Motorsports driver Norman finished second at the prestigious June Sprints, behind multiple class champion Scott Rettich. Norman again finished second to Rettich at the prestigious SCCA National Championship Runoffs at Daytona International Speedway. At the end of the season, Norman made his debut in a Formula Atlantic Swift 016.a. racing in the Historic Sportscar Racing organisation. At Sebring, the racing driver won his class.

For the 2016 season, Norman stepped up to the Atlantic Championship joining K-Hill Motorsports coached by former ChampCar driver Tõnis Kasemets. Norman won both the Pro Atlantic Championship and the SCCA National Runoffs.

Norman raced with the SVRA organisation at selected events. At Mid-Ohio Norman made his debut in a 2007 Dallara Indy Lights racing car winning the race.

For 2017, Norman stepped up to the Indy Lights Championship driving for Andretti Autosport. After driving with the team in 2017, 2018 and 2019, with multiple race wins and podiums, Norman had his first IndyCar test with Andretti at Mid-Ohio Sports Car Course on June 25, 2019.

In 2020, Norman signed with Bryan Herta Autosport for a drive in the Michelin Pilot Challenge as a co-driver to Gabby Chaves and they both grabbed the 2020 IMSA Pilot TCR Championship.

2023 saw Norman pivot to the Lamborghini Super Trofeo North America, driving for WTR Andretti in the Pro class.

== Racing record ==
=== Career summary ===
Season	Series	Team	Races	Wins	Poles	F/Laps	Podiums	Points	Position
2016	Atlantic Championship	K-Hill Motorsports	14	8	8	8	11	586	**1st**
2017	Indy Lights	Andretti Autosport	16	0	0	0	0	200	11th
2018	Indy Lights	Andretti Autosport	17	1	1	1	4	345	4th
2019	Indy Lights	Andretti Autosport	18	1	0	0	4	359	4th
2020	Michelin Pilot Challenge - TCR	Bryan Herta Autosport with Curb-Agajanian	10	3	1	0	5	289	**1st**
2021	IndyCar Series	Dale Coyne Racing with Rick Ware Racing	1	0	0	0	0	10	39th
2021	Michelin Pilot Challenge - TCR	Bryan Herta Autosport with Curb-Agajanian	9	1	2	1	4	2410	8th
2021	IMSA SportsCar Championship - LMP3	Forty7 Motorsports	2	0	0	0	1	0	NC†
2022	Michelin Pilot Challenge - TCR	Bryan Herta Autosport with Curb-Agajanian	10	0	0	0	1	2180	11th
2023	Lamborghini Super Trofeo North America - Pro	Wayne Taylor Racing with Andretti Autosport	12	2	3	4	10	135	**2nd**
2024	Lamborghini Super Trofeo North America - Pro	Wayne Taylor Racing with Andretti Autosport							

† As he was a guest driver, Norman was ineligible to score points

=== SCCA National Championship Runoffs ===
Year	Track	Car	Engine	Class	Finish	Start	Status
2015	Daytona	Van Diemen DP06	Mazda	Formula Enterprises	2	2	Running
2016	Mid-Ohio	Swift 016.a	Mazda-Cosworth	Formula Atlantic	1	1	Running

=== American Open-Wheel racing results ===
(key) (Races in bold indicate pole position, races in italics indicate fastest race lap)

==== Atlantic Championship ====
Year	Team	1	2	3	4	5	6	7	8	9	10	11	12	13	14	15	16	Rank	Points
2016	K-Hill Motorsports	**PBI**; 1	**SEB**; 1	**ATL**; 1	ATL; 6	WGL; 1	WGL; 1	**VIR**; 1	**VIR**; 1	MOH; 3	MOH; 1	PIT; 9	PIT; 5	NJMP; 1	NJMP; 2	DOM; 1	DOM; 2	1st	586

==== Indy Lights ====
Year	Team	1	2	3	4	5	6	7	8	9	10	11	12	13	14	15	16	17	18	Rank	Points
2017	Andretti Autosport	STP; 10	STP; 9	ALA; 12	ALA; 9	IMS; 8	IMS; 7	INDY; 14	ROA; 4	ROA; 7	IOW; 8	TOR; 10	TOR; 6	MOH; 9	MOH; 7	GMP; 8	WGL; 10			11th	200
2018	Andretti Autosport	STP; 6	STP; 3	ALA; 5	ALA; 7	IMS; 5	IMS; 5	INDY; 5	ROA; 6	ROA; 5	IOW; 4	TOR; 3	TOR; 4	MOH; 5	MOH; 3	GTW; 1	POR; 5	**POR**; 8		4th	345
2019	Andretti Autosport	STP; 7	STP; 6	COA; 6	COA; 8	IMS; 4	IMS; 8	INDY; 2	RDA; 1	RDA; 2	TOR; 4	TOR; 4	MOH; 2	MOH; 4	GTW; 4	POR; 7	POR; 4	LAG; 7	LAG; 5	4th	359

* Season still in progress

==== IndyCar Series ====
(key)

Year	Team	No.	Chassis	Engine	1	2	3	4	5	6	7	8	9	10	11	12	13	14	15	16	Rank	Points	Ref
2021	Dale Coyne Racing with Rick Ware Racing	52	Dallara DW12	Honda	ALA	STP	TXS	TXS	IMS	INDY	DET	DET	ROA	MOH; 20	NSH	IMS	GTW	POR	LAG	LBH	39th	10	

* Season still in progress.
