= Ozzie Fumo =

American politician

Osvaldo Fumo

Member of the Nevada Assembly from the 21st district
- In office November 9, 2016 – November 4, 2020
- Preceded by: Derek Armstrong
- Succeeded by: Elaine Marzola

Personal details
- Born: July 27, 1965 (age 60) Arlington County, Virginia, U.S.
- Party: Democratic
- Spouse: Ellen Fumo
- Children: 5

Osvaldo E. Fumo (born July 27, 1965) is an American politician and former Democratic member of the Nevada Assembly. He represented the 21st district, which covers parts of the southern Las Vegas Valley. He is currently a candidate for District attorney of Clark County, Nevada.

== Biography ==
Fumo was born in Arlington, Virginia in 1965, the son of an Italian immigrant, and moved to Nevada in 1976. He graduated from Bishop Gorman High School in 1983 and from the University of San Diego in 1987. Fumo received his Juris Doctor from Whittier Law School in 1995, and practices law with the firm Pitaro & Fumo.

Fumo ran for the Assembly in 2016, prevailing in a three-candidate Democratic primary and defeating incumbent Derek Armstrong.

On November 3, 2020, Fumo unsuccessfully ran to become a justice on the Nevada Supreme Court.

== Personal life ==
Fumo and his wife, Ellen, have 5 children: Genevieve, Veronica, Gabriella, Scott, and Stephanie.

== Political positions ==
Fumo supports raising the minimum wage to at least $12.

He supports ending Capital punishment in Nevada, and ending the school-to-prison pipeline. He cites the disproportionate use against people of color and high fiscal impact of capital punishment as reasons for its abolition.

== Electoral history ==
Nevada Assembly District 21 Democratic primary, 2016
Party	Candidate	Votes	%
Democratic	Ozzie Fumo	1,423	57.6%
Democratic	Vinny Spotleson	854	34.6%
Democratic	Ben Nakhaima	192	7.8%
Total votes		2,469	100.0%

Nevada Assembly District 21 election, 2016
Party	Candidate	Votes	%
Democratic	Ozzie Fumo	13,373	52.4%
Republican	Derek Armstrong	12,158	47.6%
Total votes		25,531	100.0%
