= Elaine Marzola =

American politician

Member of the Nevada Assembly from the 21st District
- Incumbent
- Assumed office November 4, 2020
- Preceded by: Ozzie Fumo

Personal details
- Born: Rio de Janeiro, Brazil
- Party: Democratic
- Children: 1
- Education: University of Nevada at Las Vegas Lansing community college Lansing Michigan

Elaine Marzola is an American politician currently serving in the Nevada Assembly from Nevada's 21st district. She was elected to the seat after incumbent Democrat Ozzie Fumo decided to run for Nevada Supreme Court instead of re–election. She won election in 2020, defeating Republican Cherlyn Arrington, winning 52% to 48%.
