= Andy Eisen =

American politician (born 1969)

Member of the Nevada Assembly from the 21st district
- In office November 7, 2012 – November 5, 2014
- Preceded by: Mark Sherwood
- Succeeded by: Derek Armstrong

Personal details
- Born: 1969 (age 56–57) Las Vegas, Nevada
- Party: Democratic
- Education: Northwestern University Medical School
- Website: andyeisen.com

Andrew 'Andy' Mark Eisen, (born in 1969 in Las Vegas, Nevada) is an American politician and a Democratic former member of the Nevada Assembly from 2012 until 2014, representing District 21.

== Education ==
Eisen earned his BS and MD from Northwestern University Medical School (now Feinberg School of Medicine).

== Elections ==
- 2012 When Republican Assemblyman Mark Sherwood left the legislature after one term and left the District 21 seat open, Eisen won the three-way June 12, 2012 Democratic Primary with 684 votes (39.54%) and won the three-way November 6, 2012 General election with 12,123 votes (50.07%) against Republican nominee Becky Harris and Independent American candidate Les McKay (who had run for the seat in 2008).
- Eisen was defeated by Republican Derek Armstrong 50-46% in 2014.
