= Ellen Spiegel =

American politician (born 1962)

Member of the Nevada Assembly from the 20th district
- In office November 6, 2012 – November 4, 2020
- Preceded by: Cresent Hardy
- Succeeded by: David Orentlicher

Member of the Nevada Assembly from the 21st district
- In office November 2008 – November 2010
- Preceded by: Bob Beers
- Succeeded by: Mark Sherwood

Personal details
- Born: Ellen Beth Barre; 1962 (age 63–64) Jericho, New York, U.S.
- Party: Democratic
- Spouse: Bill Spiegel
- Education: Cornell University (BS)
- Website: Campaign website

Ellen Beth Barre Spiegel (born in 1962 in New York City, New York) is an American politician and businesswoman. A member of the Democratic Party, she served as a member of the Nevada Assembly from 2008 to 2010, and again from 2012 to 2020.

Spiegel is a small-business owner, was a longtime Board member of Easter Seals Nevada, and the winner of awards from organizations including the Multiple Sclerosis Society (2020 Legislator of the Year), the March of Dimes (2015 Peggy Pierce Advocacy Award), the Urban Chamber of Commerce (2016 Women in Politics Award), the Nevada Women's Lobby (2020 Woman of Impact and 2010 Rising Star Award), and others. Spiegel was Chair of the Assembly Committee on Commerce and Labor (2019), Assistant Majority Whip in the 79th Legislative Session (2017), and when in office was one of fewer than twenty Democratic Party women to ever hold an Assembly leadership position in Nevada. She also served on the board of directors of the bipartisan National Association of Jewish Legislators (NAJL), where she was Secretary for four years and spearheaded efforts to create the NAJL Alumni Group.

== Legislative Session Committees ==
2019 Legislative Session: Commerce and Labor (Chair); Taxation (Vice Chair); Ways & Means (subcommittee Vice Chair). 2017 Legislative Session: Ways & Means; Taxation; Transportation (Vice Chair). 2015 Legislative Session: Health & Human Services; Government Affairs; Transportation. 2013 Legislative Session: Health & Human Services (Vice Chair); Judiciary; Transportation. 2009 Legislative Session: Health & Human Services; Government Affairs; Transportation.

== Education ==
Spiegel earned her BS in Consumer Economics and Public Policy from Cornell University.

== Elections ==
- 2022 Spiegel was the Democratic nominee for Nevada State Controller, having won the Democratic primary with 67.29%. She had the support of incumbent Controller Catherine Byrne, who chose to not seek reelection. The Republican candidate was Assemblyman Andy Matthews, who won the race with 50.06% of the vote.
- 2020 Spiegel gave up her Assembly seat to run in the June 9, 2020 Democratic Primary for the open Senate District 7 seat, which was also contested by fellow Assembly member Richard Carrillo and former Nevada Democratic Party Chair Roberta Lange. Lange won the race with 3,672 votes (38.3%) to Spiegel's 3,540 votes (36.9%), with Carrillo getting 2,384 votes (24.8%).
- 2018 Spiegel was unopposed for the June 12, 2018 Democratic Primary, and won the November 6, 2018 General election with 12,029 votes (62.1%) against Republican nominee Michael McDonald.
- 2016 Spiegel was challenged in the Democratic Primary by real estate attorney Darren Welsh. Spiegel prevailed, garnering 76.98% of the vote to Welsh's 23.02%. Spiegel then defeated Republican Carol Linton, who also was her 2014 opponent, in the general election, winning this time by a margin of 13,548 (60.60%) to 8,807 (39.40%).
- 2014 Spiegel was unopposed for the June 10, 2014 Democratic Primary, and won the November 4, 2014 General election with 5,664 votes (54.26%) against Republican nominee Carol Linton.
- 2012 Redistricted to District 20, and with Republican Assemblyman Cresent Hardy redistricted to District 19, Spiegel won the three-way June 12, 2012 Democratic Primary with 52.75% of the vote, Nevada State Board of Education member Gloria Bonaventura came in second with 26.29%. Spiegel won the November 6, 2012 General election with 12,894 votes (61.07%) against Republican nominee Eric Mendoza.
- 2010 Spiegel was unopposed for the June 8, 2010 Democratic Primary, but lost the November 2, 2010 General election to Republican nominee Mark Sherwood.
- 2008 Challenging incumbent Republican Assemblyman Bob L. Beers for the District 21 seat, a seat that had a Republican-registration majority and had never been won by a Democratic woman, Spiegel was unopposed for the August 12, 2008 Democratic Primary, and won the November 4, 2008 General election with 10,719 votes (50.87%) against Republican nominee Jon Ozark, who had defeated Beers in the Republican Primary.
