= Ian Baas =

American race car driver

- Nationality: (United States) American
- Born: January 9, 1983 (age 43) Noblesville, Indiana, U.S.

Ian Baas (born January 9, 1983) is an American race car driver.

Baas raced in the American Le Mans Series in 2005 for the Alex Job Finishing Second twice in the No. 24 GT class Porsche 996 RSR The first podium came at Mosport and the second at the prestigious Petit Le Mans. He has previously raced in US Formula Ford (2003–2004).

In January 2006, Baas won the GT class in the Rolex 24 Hours of Daytona with TPC racing in the No. 36 Ajilon Consulting Porsche 911 GT3 cup alongside Randy Pobst, Spencer Pumpelly and Michael Levitas. The team finished a remarkable ninth overall out of the 70-car field.

For 2007, Baas drove at Speed Porsche 997 in Rolex GT with co-driver Bob Miller. Also that season, he drove in the Stasis Audi A4 in Speed World Challenge Touring Car, racing against old teammate Randy Pobst.

In the 2009 KONI Challenge Series, while driving a Volkswagen GTI for APR Motorsport, Baas Finished fifth in Street Tuner points standings, winning first career KONI race at Barber Motorsports Park with co-driver Josh Hurley and APR Motorsport. Overall, four podiums two top-tens, led season-high 189 of 919 laps (more than 20 percent) and earned class-high three pole positions.

In 2010, Baas once again competed for APR Motorsport, this time in the Continental Tire Sports Car Challenge GS class in the all new 2010 Audi S4.

== Complete motorsports results ==
=== American Open-Wheel racing results ===
(key) (Races in bold indicate pole position, races in italics indicate fastest race lap)

==== Complete USF2000 National Championship results ====
| Year | Entrant | 1 | 2 | 3 | 4 | 5 | 6 | 7 | 8 | 9 | 10 | 11 | 12 | 13 | 14 | 15 | 16 | Pos | Points |
|---|---|---|---|---|---|---|---|---|---|---|---|---|---|---|---|---|---|---|---|
| 2003 | Cape Motorsports | SEB1 | SEB2 | LRP1 | LRP1 | MOH1 | MOH2 | ROA1; 19 | ROA2; 9 | MOH3; 14 | MOH4; 11 | ATL1; 11 | ATL2; 8 | | | | | 16th | 54 |
| 2004 | Cape Motorsports | SEB1; 5 | SEB2; 20 | ATL1; 17 | ATL2; 9 | LS1; 7 | LS2; 9 | MOS1; 13 | MOS2; 7 | MOH1; 19 | MOH2; 5 | SON1; 7 | SON2; 6 | MOH3; 8 | MOH4; 8 | ROA1; 30 | ROA2; 7 | 8th | 158 |
