= 2022 Nevada State Controller election =

- November 8, 2022
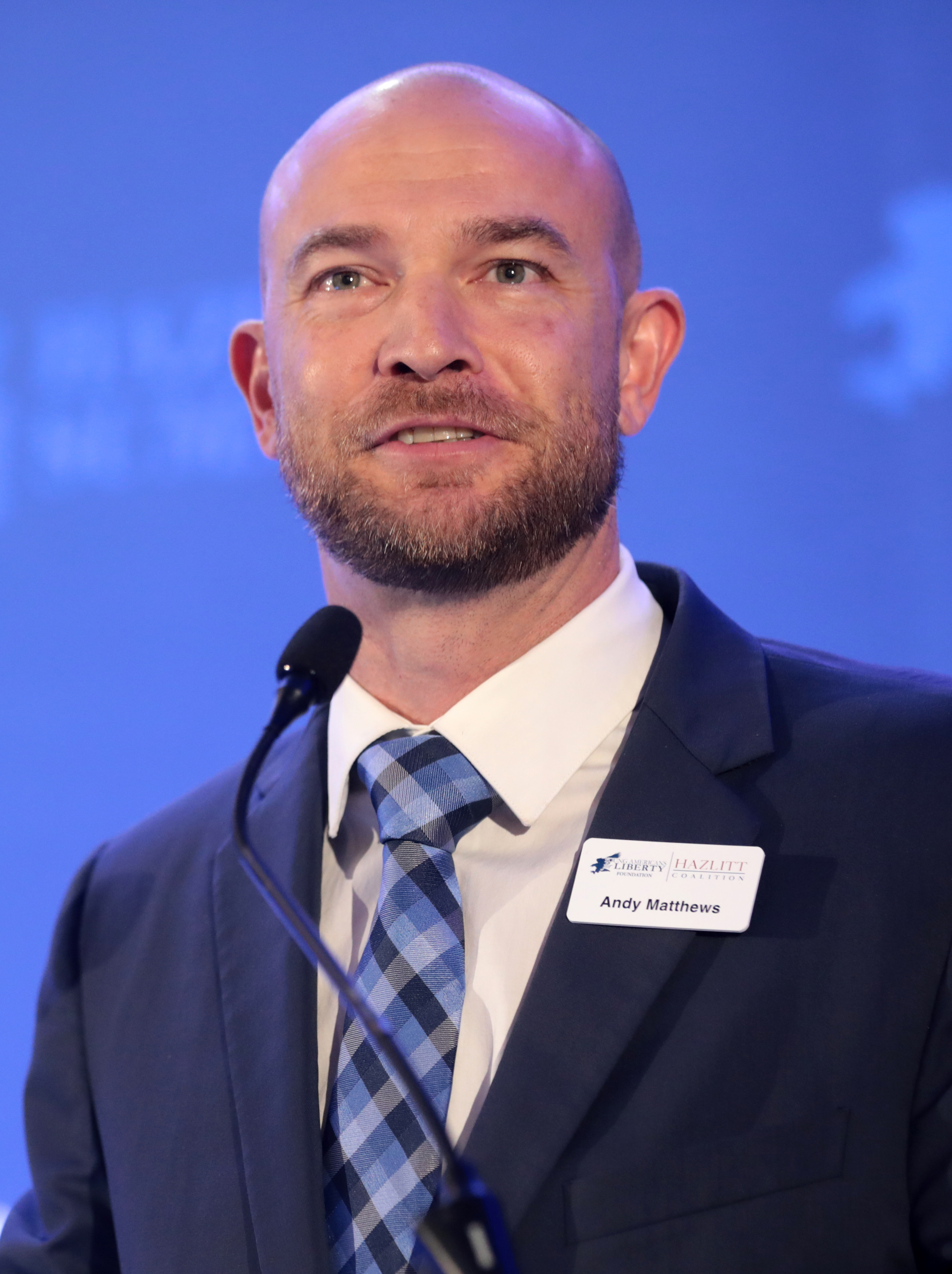

Nominee	Andy Matthews	Ellen Spiegel
Party	Republican	Democratic
Popular vote	504,703	463,092
Percentage	50.06%	45.93%
- Matthews: 40–50% 50–60% 60–70% 70–80% 80–90% >90% Spiegel: 40–50% 50–60% 60–70% 70–80% 80–90% >90% Tie: 40–50% 50% No votes
State Controller before election
Catherine Byrne
Democratic
Elected State Controller
Andy Matthews
Republican

The 2022 Nevada State Controller election took place on November 8, 2022, to elect the next Nevada State Controller. Incumbent Democratic Controller Catherine Byrne did not seek re-election to a second term. Republican candidate Andy Matthews won the election, flipping the seat and marking the best performance for a Nevada Republican in a statewide race in 2022, as all other successful Republican candidates for statewide races won with pluralities of the vote.

== Democratic primary ==
=== Candidates ===
==== Nominee ====
- Ellen Spiegel, former state assemblywoman (2012–2020)

==== Eliminated in primary ====
- Alex Costa, investor

=== Results ===
Democratic primary results
Party	Candidate	Votes	%
Democratic	Ellen Spiegel	111,989	67.26%
Democratic	Alex Costa	40,664	24.42%
None of These Candidates		13,841	8.31%
Total votes		166,494	100.0%

== Republican primary ==
=== Candidates ===
==== Nominee ====
- Andy Matthews, state assemblyman

== Independents and third-party candidates ==
=== Candidates ===
==== Nominees ====
- Jed Profeta (Libertarian)

== General election ==
=== Polling ===
Poll source	Date(s) administered	Sample size (Note: Key: A – all adults RV – registered voters LV – likely voters V – unclear)	Margin of error	Ellen Spiegel (D)	Andy Matthews (R)	None of These Candidates	Other	Undecided
OH Predictive Insights	September 20–29, 2022	741 (LV)	± 3.6%	31%	39%	6%	4% (Note: Profeta (L) with 4%)	21%

=== Results ===
2022 Nevada State Controller election
Party	Candidate	Votes	%	±%
Republican	Andy Matthews	504,703	50.06%	+3.82%
Democratic	Ellen Spiegel	463,092	45.93%	−4.67%
None of These Candidates		25,029	2.48%	-0.69%
Libertarian	Jed Profeta	15,375	1.52%	N/A
Total votes		1,008,199	100.00%	N/A
Republican gain from Democratic				

==== By county ====
County	Ellen Spiegel Democratic		Andy Matthews Republican		Various candidates Other parties		Margin		Total votes cast
County	#	%	#	%	#	%	#	%	Total votes cast
Carson City	9,410	40.07%	13,034	55.50%	1,040	4.43%	3,624	15.43%	23,484
Churchill	2,094	21.39%	7,203	73.58%	492	5.03%	5,109	52.19%	9,789
Clark	336,094	49.86%	312,102	46.30%	25,896	3.84%	−23,992	−3.56%	674,092
Douglas	8,419	29.25%	19,317	67.11%	1,047	3.64%	10,898	37.86%	28,783
Elko	2,859	17.84%	12,384	77.26%	787	4.91%	9,525	59.42%	16,030
Esmeralda	59	13.08%	357	79.16%	35	7.76%	298	66.08%	451
Eureka	51	6.58%	686	88.52%	38	4.90%	635	81.94%	775
Humboldt	1,140	18.79%	4,592	75.70%	334	5.51%	3,452	56.91%	6,066
Lander	312	14.19%	1,730	78.71%	156	7.10%	1,418	64.51%	2,198
Lincoln	253	11.85%	1,773	83.04%	109	5.11%	1,520	71.19%	2,135
Lyon	5,687	24.36%	16,541	70.85%	1,120	4.80%	10,854	46.49%	23,348
Mineral	563	30.07%	1,154	61.65%	155	8.28%	591	31.57%	1,872
Nye	5,508	26.65%	14,117	68.31%	1,042	5.04%	8,609	41.66%	20,667
Pershing	357	20.19%	1,283	72.57%	128	7.24%	926	52.38%	1,768
Storey	645	25.42%	1,751	69.02%	141	5.56%	1,106	43.59%	2,537
Washoe	89,023	46.66%	94,036	49.29%	7,719	4.05%	5,013	2.63%	190,778
White Pine	618	18.04%	2,643	77.15%	165	4.82%	2,025	59.11%	3,426
Totals	463,092	45.93%	504,703	50.06%	40,404	4.01%	41,611	4.13%	1,008,199

Counties that flipped from Democratic to Republican

- Washoe (largest municipality: Reno)

==== By congressional district ====
Despite losing the state, Spiegel won three of four congressional districts.

District	Spiegel	Matthews	Representative
1st	50%	46%	Dina Titus
2nd	39%	57%	Mark Amodei
3rd	49%	47%	Susie Lee
4th	48%	47%	Steven Horsford
