= 2005 Formula Ford Zetec Championship Series =

Car racing competition

2005 Formula Ford Zetec Cooper Tires Championship Series season

Seasons
- ← 2004 2006 →

The 2005 Formula Ford Zetec Cooper Tires Championship Series was the fifth the USF2000 Ford Zetec championship. Aiken Racing driver Jay Howard took the title in a Van Diemen RF03. He was the second Brit to win the championship, after Dan Wheldon in 1999.

== Race calendar and results ==
Round	Circuit	Location	Date	Pole position	Fastest lap	Winner
1	Road Atlanta	(United States) Braselton, Georgia	April 16	(United Kingdom) Jay Howard	(United States) Jason Bowles	(United Kingdom) Jay Howard
2	Road Atlanta	(United States) Braselton, Georgia	April 17	(United States) Jason Bowles	(United Kingdom) Jay Howard	(United Kingdom) Jay Howard
3	Mid-Ohio Sports Car Course	(United States) Lexington, Ohio	May 22	(United Kingdom) Jay Howard	(United Kingdom) Joey Foster	(United Kingdom) Jay Howard
4	Mid-Ohio Sports Car Course	(United States) Lexington, Ohio	May 22	(United Kingdom) Joey Foster	(United Kingdom) Joey Foster	(United Kingdom) Jay Howard
5	Grand Prix of Cleveland	(United States) Cleveland, Ohio	June 25	(Canada) Mike Forest	(United Kingdom) Jay Howard	(United Kingdom) Jay Howard
6	Grand Prix of Cleveland	(United States) Cleveland, Ohio	June 26	(United Kingdom) Jay Howard	(United Kingdom) Jay Howard	(United Kingdom) Jay Howard
7	Road America	(United States) Elkhart Lake, Wisconsin	August 6	(United Kingdom) Jay Howard	(United Kingdom) Joey Foster	(United Kingdom) Joey Foster
8	Road America	(United States) Elkhart Lake, Wisconsin	August 7	(United Kingdom) Joey Foster	(United Kingdom) Joey Foster	(United Kingdom) Jay Howard
9	Mid-Ohio Sports Car Course	(United States) Lexington, Ohio	August 27	(United Kingdom) Joey Foster	(United Kingdom) Jay Howard	(United Kingdom) Joey Foster
10	Mid-Ohio Sports Car Course	(United States) Lexington, Ohio	August 28	(United Kingdom) Joey Foster	(United Kingdom) Jay Howard	(United Kingdom) Jay Howard
11	Virginia International Raceway	(United States) Alton, Virginia	October 9	(United Kingdom) Jay Howard	(United States) Alan Sciuto	(United States) Alan Sciuto
12	Virginia International Raceway	(United States) Alton, Virginia	October 9	(United States) Alan Sciuto	(United States) Alan Sciuto	(United Kingdom) Jay Howard

== Final standings ==
Rank	Driver	(United States) ATL1	(United States) ATL2	(United States) MOH1	(United States) MOH2	(United States) CLE1	(United States) CLE2	(United States) ROA1	(United States) ROA2	(United States) MOH3	(United States) MOH4	(United States) VIR1	(United States) VIR2	Points
1	(United Kingdom) Jay Howard	1	1	1	1	1	1	26	1	2	1	22	1	307
2	(United Kingdom) Joey Foster	32	3	2	2	33	2	1	2	1	2	21	21	215
3	(Canada) Chris Guerrieri	28	5	5	24	3	4	7	5	4	4	6	4	180
4	(United States) Jason Byers	5	9	24	13	6	6	2	3	8	5	8	6	164
5	(United States) Chris Meredith	10	8	25	6	8	7	10	8	9	12	4	9	133
6	(United States) Doug Smith	6	11	9	5	9	11	23	9	10	10	7	5	132
7	(United States) Matt McDonough	9	29	3	3	7	8			3	3			128
8	(United States) Gerry Kraut	11	13	8	16	30	12	3	6	11	24	9	11	116
9	(United States) Nick Haye	4	4	27	14	36	13	25	25	7	6	5	7	116
10	(United States) Nicholas Boulle	26	30	7	11	10	16	29	15	5	9	3	8	113
11	(United States) John Lombardo	12	14	26	19	11	10	6	27	12	8			79
12	(Venezuela) Enzo Potolicchio	3	7	6	4									72
13	(United States) Chuck Lessick	16	19	11	8	34	34	15	14	16	25	15	14	64
14	(United States) Scott Rubenzer	7	10	10	28	18	17			27	11			56
15	(United States) Noah Bystrom					37	20	4	4			18	10	54
16	(Canada) Brian Graham	30	12	31	15	13	9	13	13					54
17	(United States) Jason Bowles	2	2											51
18	(United States) Dwight Rider	15	21	14	26	38	32			29	26	10	12	41
19	(United States) Chris Hundley	19	16			16	35	8	7					40
20	(United States) Ira Fierberg	33	18	28	17	15	15			15	17	20	20	34
21	(Italy) Fiorenzo Tirinnanzi	14	15					12	16	30	29			28
22	(United States) Franklin Futrelle	34	6	12	27									27
23	(United States) Cole Morgan	8	20			17	38			18	16			27
24	(United States) David Clarke	31	DNS	DNS	DNS	25	36	28	17	24	15	11	DNS	25
25	(United States) Rich Zober	21	28	DNS	DNS	21	25					12	13	21
26	(United States) John Gluckin	24	25	17	17	31	22	24	21					15
27	(United States) Dick Rose			18	25	32	29			19	19			11
28	(United States) Chris Dona			15	DNS	19	23							10
29	(United States) Slade Miller	36	17											4
30	(United States) Scott Dick			18	25	32	29			19	19			3
31	(United States) Brian Tomasi	35	DNS					27	28					2
32	(United States) Kevin Hartwig			22	DNS									1
	(United States) Jim Belay	DNS	DNS											
	(United States) Bryan Blair					23	28							
	(United States) Dan Bruggeman	17	DNS					16	26					
	(United States) Brian Burke	23	26	20	21	27	33	22	19	20	23			
	(United States) Craig Clawson									21	20	13	15	
	(United States) Brian Cleary							20	22					
	(Canada) Olivier Comeau							9	18					
	(United States) Mark Defer					35	14							
	(United States) Dan Denison							21	20	26	18			
	(United States) Mark Dickens					24	24							
	(Canada) Mike Forest			4	7	5	37							
	(United States) Peter Gonzalez	25	31	19	20	DNS	DNS							
	(United States) Barry Haynie	27	27	23	23	39	39			23	22			
	(United States) J.R. Hildebrand					2	3					17	3	
	(United States) Brad Jaeger					4	5							
	(United States) Bill Jordan	18	DNS			22	30					14	18	
	(United States) Doug Kniffin	20	24	16	12	14	21			28	30	16	17	
	(United States) Philip Metzger							19	10					
	(United States) Adam Pecorari									6	28			
	(United States) Greg Pizzo	DNS	DNS											
	(United States) Robert Podlesni											2	19	
	(United States) Brendan Puderbach					26	26			22	21	19	16	
	(United States) Seth Ravndal					20	18							
	(United States) Glennon Reidler	29	DNS	21	22									
	(United States) Al Salvo			14	9	39	27							
	(United States) Alan Sciuto											1	2	
	(Venezuela) Ricardo Vassmer	13	23	29	10	12	19	11	11	14	14			
	(United States) Walter Vollrath							18	23					
	(United States) William Wald					28	31							
	(United States) Mike Wettstein							17	29					
	(United States) Browning Williams	DNS	DNS											
