= 2004 Formula Ford Zetec Championship Series =

Car racing competition

2004 Formula Ford Zetec Cooper Tires Championship Series season

Seasons
- ← 2003 2005 →

The 2004 Formula Ford Zetec Cooper Tires Championship Series was the fourth the USF2000 Ford Zetec championship. Cape Motorsports driver Bobby Wilson took the title in a Van Diemen RF03. Jason Bowles won the rookie of the year title.

== Race calendar and results ==
| Round | Circuit | Location | Date | Pole position | Fastest lap | Winner |
|---|---|---|---|---|---|---|
| 1 | Sebring International Raceway | (United States) Sebring, Florida | 18 March | (New Zealand) Wade Cunningham | (United States) Bobby Wilson | (United States) Jason Bowles |
| 2 | Sebring International Raceway | (United States) Sebring, Florida | 19 March | (United States) Jason Bowles | (United States) Adam Pecorari | (United States) Andrew Prendeville |
| 3 | Road Atlanta | (United States) Braselton, Georgia | 24 April | (New Zealand) Wade Cunningham | (United States) Bobby Wilson | (United States) Bobby Wilson |
| 4 | Road Atlanta | (United States) Braselton, Georgia | 25 April | (United States) Bobby Wilson | (United States) Bobby Wilson | (United States) Bobby Wilson |
| 5 | Mazda Raceway Laguna Seca | (United States) Monterey, California | 1 May | (New Zealand) Wade Cunningham | (New Zealand) Wade Cunningham | (United States) Ian Lacy |
| 6 | Mazda Raceway Laguna Seca | (United States) Monterey, California | 2 May | (New Zealand) Wade Cunningham | (United States) Ron White | (United States) Ian Lacy |
| 7 | Mosport International Raceway | (Canada) Bowmanville, Ontario | 22 May | (United States) Ian Lacy | (United States) Andrew Prendeville | (United States) Andrew Prendeville |
| 8 | Mosport International Raceway | (Canada) Bowmanville, Ontario | 22 May | (United States) Andrew Prendeville | (United States) Jason Bowles | (United States) Ian Lacy |
| 9 | Mid-Ohio Sports Car Course | (United States) Lexington, Ohio | 26 June | (United States) Adam Pecorari | (United States) Andrew Prendeville | (United States) Andrew Prendeville |
| 10 | Mid-Ohio Sports Car Course | (United States) Lexington, Ohio | 27 June | (United States) Andrew Prendeville | (United States) Adam Pecorari | (United States) Adam Pecorari |
| 11 | Infineon Raceway | (United States) Sonoma, California | 17 July | (United States) Adam Pecorari | (United States) Bobby Wilson | (United States) Bobby Wilson |
| 12 | Infineon Raceway | (United States) Sonoma, California | 18 July | | | (United Kingdom) Jay Howard |
| 13 | Mid-Ohio Sports Car Course | (United States) Lexington, Ohio | 7 August | (United States) Adam Pecorari | (United States) Adam Pecorari | (United States) Adam Pecorari |
| 14 | Mid-Ohio Sports Car Course | (United States) Lexington, Ohio | 8 August | (United States) Adam Pecorari | (United States) Adam Pecorari | (United States) Adam Pecorari |
| 15 | Road America | (United States) Elkhart Lake, Wisconsin | 21 August | (United States) Adam Pecorari | (United States) Bobby Wilson | (United States) Adam Pecorari |
| 16 | Road America | (United States) Elkhart Lake, Wisconsin | 22 August | (United States) Bobby Wilson | (United States) Jason Bowles | (United States) Bobby Wilson |

== Final standings ==
| Rank | Driver | (United States) SEB1 | (United States) SEB2 | (United States) ATL1 | (United States) ATL2 | (United States) LS1 | (United States) LS2 | (Canada) MOS1 | (Canada) MOS2 | (United States) MOH1 | (United States) MOH2 | (United States) SON1 | (United States) SON2 | (United States) MOH3 | (United States) MOH4 | (United States) ROA1 | (United States) ROA2 | Points |
|---|---|---|---|---|---|---|---|---|---|---|---|---|---|---|---|---|---|---|
| 1 | (United States) Bobby Wilson | 4 | 2 | 1 | 1 | 4 | 3 | 3 | 5 | 3 | 4 | 1 | 14 | 4 | 5 | 2 | 1 | 333 |
| 2 | (United States) Andrew Prendeville | 14 | 1 | 2 | 2 | 3 | 4 | 1 | 2 | 1 | 2 | 2 | 4 | 5 | 4 | 33 | 8 | 317 |
| 3 | (United States) Adam Pecorari | 2 | 4 | 16 | 7 | 10 | 7 | 2 | 4 | 17 | 1 | 4 | 5 | 1 | 1 | 1 | 4 | 308 |
| 4 | (United States) Jason Bowles | 1 | 3 | 3 | 3 | 20 | 2 | 12 | 3 | 5 | 6 | 8 | 3 | 6 | 3 | 5 | 5 | 283 |
| 5 | (New Zealand) Wade Cunningham | 3 | 6 | 15 | 4 | 2 | 6 | DNS | DNQ | 2 | 7 | 6 | 2 | 3 | 2 | 4 | 2 | 271 |
| 6 | (United States) Ian Lacy | | | | | 1 | 1 | 4 | 1 | 18 | 18 | 5 | 15 | 2 | 18 | 3 | 3 | 217 |
| 7 | (United States) Steve Welk | 8 | 10 | 9 | 10 | 6 | 10 | 7 | 8 | 6 | 3 | 11 | 9 | 7 | 6 | 7 | 9 | 193 |
| 8 | (United States) Ian Baas | 5 | 20 | 17 | 9 | 7 | 9 | 13 | 7 | 19 | 5 | 7 | 6 | 8 | 8 | 30 | 7 | 158 |
| 9 | (United States) Scott Rubenzer | 10 | 8 | 5 | 6 | | | 8 | 10 | 11 | 19 | | | | | 10 | 11 | 112 |
| 10 | (Canada) Chris Guerrieri | | | | | | | 6 | 12 | 8 | 12 | 10 | 16 | 12 | 9 | 6 | 6 | 109 |
| 11 | (United States) Jason Byers | 9 | 19 | 8 | 8 | | | | | 4 | 8 | | | 9 | 7 | 27 | 14 | 105 |
| 12 | (United States) John Lombardo | | | | | 13 | 11 | | | | | 9 | 7 | 11 | 10 | 9 | 29 | 78 |
| 13 | (United States) Marshall Aiken | 18 | 11 | 6 | 16 | 9 | 12 | 10 | 9 | | | | | | | | | 77 |
| 14 | (United States) Gerald Kraut | | | 12 | 13 | | | | | 15 | 11 | | | 17 | 12 | 8 | 10 | 70 |
| 15 | (United States) Ron White | 16 | 18 | 7 | 5 | 8 | 5 | | | | | | | | | | | 69 |
| 16 | (United States) Erick Hansen | | | 13 | 14 | | | | | 9 | 10 | | | 10 | 15 | 28 | 13 | 64 |
| 17 | (United States) Chris Dona | 12 | 12 | | | | | 5 | 6 | | | | | | | 14 | 17 | 61 |
| 18 | (United States) Darren Brown | 13 | 15 | 14 | 15 | | | | | 10 | 13 | | | | | 16 | 33 | 52 |
| 19 | (United States) Ira Fierberg | | | | | 18 | 14 | | | 13 | 16 | 18 | 19 | 13 | 14 | 19 | 31 | 41 |
| 20 | (United States) Dick Rose | 15 | 17 | | | | | | | 14 | 17 | | | 16 | 16 | | | 31 |
| 21 | (United States) Jerry Szykulski | | | 11 | 11 | 19 | 13 | | | | | | | | | 11 | 19 | 29 |
| 22 | (United States) Mike Andersen | | | 4 | 17 | | | | | | | | | | | | | 23 |
| 23 | (United States) Kevin Hartwig | | | | | | | | | | | | | | | 22 | 21 | 2 |
| | (Canada) Greg Beresford | | | | | | | 9 | 13 | | | | | | | | | |
| | (United States) David Burkett | 17 | 9 | 10 | 12 | | | | | | | | | | | | | |
| | (United States) Chris Carlson | | | | | | | | | | | | | | | 17 | 27 | |
| | (United States) Thomas Copeland | | | | | | | | | | | 17 | 13 | | | | | |
| | (United States) Doug DaCosta | | | | | 15 | 19 | | | | | | | | | | | |
| | (United States) Geoff Fickling | | | | | | | | | | | | | 14 | 13 | | | |
| | (Canada) Mike Forest | | | | | 11 | 17 | | | | | | | | | | | |
| | (United States) David Glassman | 20 | DNS | | | | | | | | | | | | | | | |
| | (United States) Alan D. Guibord | 11 | 14 | | | | | | | | | | | | | | | |
| | (United States) Alan R. Guibord | 19 | 16 | | | | | | | | | | | | | | | |
| | (United Kingdom) Jay Howard | | | | | | | | | | | 3 | 1 | | | | | |
| | (United States) Brad Jaeger | | | | | 17 | 20 | | | | | | | | | | | |
| | (United States) Bill Jordan | | | | | | | | | | | | | | | 13 | 25 | |
| | (United States) David Jurca | | | | | | | | | | | | | 19 | 11 | | | |
| | (United States) Peter LeSueur | | | | | | | | | | | | | | | 26 | 23 | |
| | (United States) Russ Lindemann | | | | | | | | | 12 | 14 | | | | | | | |
| | (Canada) Roberto Mancino | | | | | | | 11 | 11 | | | | | | | | | |
| | (United States) Robbie Pecorari | | | | | 5 | 8 | | | | | | | | | | | |
| | (United States) Greg Pizzo | | | | | 16 | 18 | | | | | 16 | 12 | 18 | 19 | 34 | 34 | |
| | (Venezuela) Enzo Potolicchio | | | | | | | | | 7 | 9 | | | | | | | |
| | (United States) Doug Prendeville | 6 | 5 | | | | | | | | | | | | | | | |
| | (United States) Glennon Reidler | | | | | | | | | | | | | 15 | 17 | 25 | 28 | |
| | (United States) Dwight Rider | | | | | 12 | 16 | | | | | 15 | 17 | | | 20 | 20 | |
| | (United States) Brian Shepard | | | | | | | | | | | | | | | 32 | 26 | |
| | (United States) Doug Smith | 7 | 7 | | | | | | | | | | | | | | | |
| | (United States) Tony Smith | | | | | | | | | | | | | | | 23 | 22 | |
| | (United States) Ron Thomas, II | | | | | | | | | 16 | 15 | | | | | | | |
| | (United States) Fiorenzo Tirinnanzi | | | | | 14 | 15 | | | | | 12 | 10 | | | | | |
| | (United States) Jim Victor | | | | | | | | | | | | | | | 18 | 32 | |
| | (United States) Mike Wettstein | | | | | | | | | | | | | | | 29 | 24 | |
| | (United States) Bob Wright | 21 | 13 | | | | | | | | | | | | | | | |
