= 2003 Formula Ford Zetec Championship Series =

Car racing competition

2003 Formula Ford Zetec Cooper Tires Championship Series season

Seasons
- ← 2002 2004 →

The 2003 Formula Ford Zetec Championship Series was the third USF2000 Ford Zetec championship. PR1 Motorsports driver Jonathan Bomarito took the title in a Van Diemen RF03.

== Race calendar and results ==
| Round | Circuit | Location | Date | Pole position | Fastest lap | Winner |
|---|---|---|---|---|---|---|
| 1 | Sebring International Raceway | (United States) Sebring, Florida | March 13 | (United Kingdom) Westley Barber | (United Kingdom) Westley Barber | (United Kingdom) Westley Barber |
| 2 | Sebring International Raceway | (United States) Sebring, Florida | March 14 | (United Kingdom) Westley Barber | (United Kingdom) Westley Barber | (United Kingdom) Westley Barber |
| (Note: The race 4th Annual Spring Racing Invitational at Phoenix International Raceway was a non-championship race.) | Phoenix International Raceway | (United States) Avondale, Arizona | April 5 | (United States) Jonathan Bomarito | (United States) Charlie Kimball | (United States) Charlie Kimball |
| (Note: The race 4th Annual Spring Racing Invitational at Phoenix International Raceway was a non-championship race.) | Phoenix International Raceway | (United States) Avondale, Arizona | April 6 | (United States) Charlie Kimball | (United States) Charlie Kimball | (United States) Charlie Kimball |
| 3 | Lime Rock Park | (United States) Lakeville, Connecticut | May 24 | (United States) Jonathan Bomarito | (United Kingdom) Westley Barber | (United States) Jonathan Bomarito |
| 4 | Lime Rock Park | (United States) Lakeville, Connecticut | May 26 | (United States) Lawson Aschenbach | (United States) Lawson Aschenbach | (United States) Lawson Aschenbach |
| 5 | Mid-Ohio Sports Car Course | (United States) Lexington, Ohio | June 29 | (United Kingdom) Westley Barber | (Estonia) Tõnis Kasemets | (Estonia) Tõnis Kasemets |
| 6 | Mid-Ohio Sports Car Course | (United States) Lexington, Ohio | June 29 | (United Kingdom) Westley Barber | (United Kingdom) Lawson Aschenbach | (United Kingdom) Westley Barber |
| 7 | Road America | (United States) Elkhart Lake, Wisconsin | August 2 | (United Kingdom) Westley Barber | (Estonia) Tõnis Kasemets | (United States) Charlie Kimball |
| 8 | Road America | (United States) Elkhart Lake, Wisconsin | August 3 | (United Kingdom) Westley Barber | (Estonia) Tõnis Kasemets | (United States) Charlie Kimball |
| 9 | Mid-Ohio Sports Car Course | (United States) Lexington, Ohio | August 9 | (United States) Jonathan Bomarito | (United States) Andrew Prendeville | (United States) Jonathan Bomarito |
| 10 | Mid-Ohio Sports Car Course | (United States) Lexington, Ohio | August 10 | (United States) Andrew Prendeville | (United States) Jonathan Bomarito | (United States) Jonathan Bomarito |
| 11 | Road Atlanta | (United States) Braselton, Georgia | October 16 | (United Kingdom) Westley Barber | (United States) Jonathan Bomarito | (United States) Jonathan Bomarito |
| 12 | Road Atlanta | (United States) Braselton, Georgia | October 17 | (United States) Jonathan Bomarito | (United States) Jonathan Bomarito | (United States) Jonathan Bomarito |

== Final standings ==
| Rank | Driver | (United States) SEB1 | (United States) SEB2 | (United States) PIR1 | (United States) PIR2 | (United States) LRP1 | (United States) LRP2 | (United States) MOH1 | (United States) MOH2 | (United States) ROA1 | (United States) ROA2 | (United States) MOH3 | (United States) MOH4 | (United States) ATL1 | (United States) ATL2 | Points |
|---|---|---|---|---|---|---|---|---|---|---|---|---|---|---|---|---|
| 1 | (United States) Jonathan Bomarito | 2 | 7 | 2 | 2 | 1 | 3 | 3 | 5 | 3 | 4 | 1 | 1 | 1 | 1 | 267 |
| 2 | (United Kingdom) Westley Barber | 1 | 1 | 3 | 13 | 2 | 2 | 2 | 1 | 23 | 3 | 4 | 3 | DSQ | 2 | 262 |
| 3 | (United States) Charlie Kimball | 27 | 3 | 1 | 1 | 11 | DNS | 6 | 2 | 1 | 1 | 2 | 8 | 2 | 3 | 219 |
| 4 | (Estonia) Tõnis Kasemets | 7 | 13 | | | 3 | 15 | 1 | 3 | 2 | 22 | 3 | 26 | 8 | 6 | 177 |
| 5 | (United States) Andrew Prendeville | 12 | 5 | | | 4 | 4 | 4 | 23 | 7 | 5 | 6 | 25 | 6 | 5 | 161 |
| 6 | (United States) Lawson Aschenbach | 5 | 4 | 4 | 3 | 24 | 1 | 8 | 4 | 22 | 2 | 5 | 22 | 22 | 9 | 156 |
| 7 | (United States) Andy Brumbaugh | 3 | 19 | | | 7 | 6 | 5 | 7 | 6 | 26 | 7 | 20 | 3 | 4 | 154 |
| 8 | (United States) Adam Pecorari | 14 | 9 | | | 8 | 7 | 9 | 9 | 4 | 28 | 24 | 2 | 4 | 21 | 134 |
| 9 | (United States) James Gue | 25 | 14 | | | 26 | 8 | 11 | 20 | 5 | 7 | 17 | 4 | 5 | 7 | 116 |
| 10 | (United States) Steve Welk | 11 | 8 | | | 10 | 17 | 12 | 12 | 8 | 11 | 8 | 9 | 13 | 13 | 108 |
| 11 | (United States) Chris Festa | 15 | 11 | 6 | 4 | 9 | 16 | 10 | 10 | 9 | 25 | 9 | 5 | 10 | 24 | 107 |
| 12 | (United States) Craig Baltzer | 9 | 6 | | | 5 | 19 | 7 | 6 | 11 | 21 | 26 | 6 | | | 102 |
| 13 | (United States) Doug Prendeville | 24 | 16 | | | 12 | 20 | 16 | 8 | 26 | 6 | 11 | 7 | 9 | 25 | 85 |
| 14 | (United States) Matt McDonough | 6 | 12 | | | 6 | 5 | 21 | 11 | | | 12 | 17 | | | 80 |
| 15 | (United States) Scott Rubenzer | 26 | 17 | | | | | 13 | 21 | 10 | 10 | 10 | | | | 56 |
| 16 | (United States) Ian Baas | | | | | | | | | 19 | 9 | 14 | 11 | 11 | 8 | 54 |
| 17 | (United States) Doug Smith | 18 | 26 | | | 14 | 13 | | | | | 15 | 12 | 14 | 20 | 42 |
| 18 | (United States) Ira Fierberg | | | 10 | 8 | 21 | 18 | 17 | 13 | 14 | 24 | 18 | 13 | 17 | 18 | 42 |
| 19 | (United States) Tony Loniewski | 13 | 2 | | | | | | | | | | | | | 33 |
| 20 | (United States) Josh Hunt | | | | | | | | | | | 13 | 18 | 12 | 10 | 31 |
| 21 | (United States) Ricardo Imery | 8 | 10 | | | | | | | | | | | | | 24 |
| 22 | (United States) Al Salvo | | | 12 | 12 | | | | | 20 | 18 | 22 | 15 | 16 | 16 | 21 |
| 23 | (United States) Jason Kritikos | 4 | 24 | | | | | | | | | | | | | 20 |
| 24 | (United States) Dustin Hodges | 17 | 20 | | | 25 | 9 | 24 | 24 | | | | | | | 18 |
| 25 | (United States) Geoff Fickling | | | 5 | 5 | | | | | 13 | 20 | 16 | 24 | | | 15 |
| 26 | (Austria) Walter Lechner, Jr. | 10 | DNS | | | | | | | | | | | | | 11 |
| 27 | (United States) Dick Rose | 21 | 22 | | | | | 18 | 18 | | | 20 | 19 | | | 11 |
| 28 | (United States) Romeo Kapudija | 16 | 25 | | | | | | | | | | | | | 6 |
| 29 | (United States) Jeff Sakowicz | 23 | 18 | | | | | | | | | | | | | 4 |
| 30 | (United States) David Burkett | 22 | 23 | | | | | | | | | | | | | 2 |
| | (United States) Marshall Aiken | | | | | | | | | | | | | 24 | 11 | |
| | (United States) Dan Bruggeman | | | | | | | | | 17 | 17 | | | | | |
| | (United States) Kyle Burts | | | | | | | | | 18 | 16 | DNS | DNS | | | |
| | (United States) Jason Byers | | | | | | | | | 27 | 8 | | | | | |
| | (United States) Chris Carlson | | | | | | | | | 16 | 27 | | | | | |
| | (United States) Andy Chu | | | | | 17 | 11 | 20 | 17 | | | | | 21 | 19 | |
| | (United States) Johnnie Crean | | | | | | | 19 | 22 | | | 19 | 14 | | | |
| | (United States) Mark Cruz | | | | | 18 | DNS | | | | | | | | | |
| | (United States) Matthew DiRenzo | | | | | | | | | | | | | 20 | 14 | |
| | (United States) Chris Dona | 19 | 15 | | | 13 | 12 | 23 | 14 | | | | | 18 | 15 | |
| | (United States) Alan D. Guibord | | | | | 15 | DNS | | | | | | | | | |
| | (United States) Alan R. Guibord | | | | | 22 | DNS | | | | | | | | | |
| | (United States) Nick Fanelli | 20 | 21 | | | | | | | | | | | | | |
| | (United States) Scott Foutch | | | 9 | 9 | | | | | | | | | | | |
| | (United States) John Gluckin | | | | | | | | | DNS | 23 | | | | | |
| | (United States) Erick Hansen | | | | | 16 | 14 | 14 | 15 | DNQ | DNQ | 25 | 16 | 19 | 17 | |
| | (United States) Peter Hastrup | | | 8 | 7 | | | | | | | | | | | |
| | (United States) Barry Haynie | | | | | | | 22 | 19 | | | | | | | |
| | (United States) Jessie Houser | | | 11 | 11 | | | | | | | | | | | |
| | (United States) Sean Kelly | | | 7 | 6 | | | | | | | | | | | |
| | (Estonia) Philip Klaar | | | | | | | | | | | | | 15 | 12 | |
| | (United States) Douglas Kniffin | | | | | 19 | 10 | | | | | | | | | |
| | (United States) Gerald Kraut | | | | | | | | | 24 | 12 | | | | | |
| | (United States) Eric Langbein | | | | | 15 | 16 | | | | | | | | | |
| | (United States) John Levy | | | | | 20 | DNS | | | | | | | | | |
| | (United States) Les Phillips | | | 13 | 10 | | | | | | | | | | | |
| | (United States) Ken Reinders | | | | | | | | | 21 | 19 | | | | | |
| | (United States) Mike Rodney | | | | | | | | | 15 | 15 | | | | | |
| | (United States) Jerry Szykulski | | | | | | | | | 25 | 14 | | | | | |
| | (United States) Ron Thomas, II | | | | | | | | | | | 21 | 21 | | | |
| | (United States) Steve Thomson | | | | | | | | | 10 | 13 | | | | | |
| | (United States) Browning Williams | | | | | | | | | | | 23 | 23 | | | |
| | (United States) Bob Wright | | | | | 23 | DNS | | | | | | | | | |
