= Keith Grant =

British sound engineer

- Born: Keith Robertson Grant; 16 February 1941; Norfolk, England
- Died: 18 June 2012 (aged 71); Sunbury-on-Thames, England
- Occupation: Sound engineer

Keith Robertson Grant (16 February 1941 – 18 June 2012) was a British sound engineer. He won a British Academy Film Award in the category Best Soundtrack for the film Jesus Christ Superstar.

Grant died on 18 June 2012 in Sunbury-on-Thames, at the age of 71.

== Selected filmography ==
- Jesus Christ Superstar (1973; co-won with Les Wiggins and Gordon McCallum)
