= Mark Sherwood =

American politician (born 1970)

Member of the Nevada Assembly from the 21st district
- In office 2010–2012
- Preceded by: Ellen Spiegel
- Succeeded by: Andy Eisen

Personal details
- Born: 1970 (age 55–56)
- Party: Republican
- Education: Brigham Young University

Mark Sherwood (born 1970) is an American Republican politician who represented District 21 in the Nevada Assembly from 2010 to 2012.

He graduated from Brigham Young University. Sherwood endorsed Mitt Romney in the 2012 United States presidential election.
