= Gabby Chaves =

Colombian-American racing driver

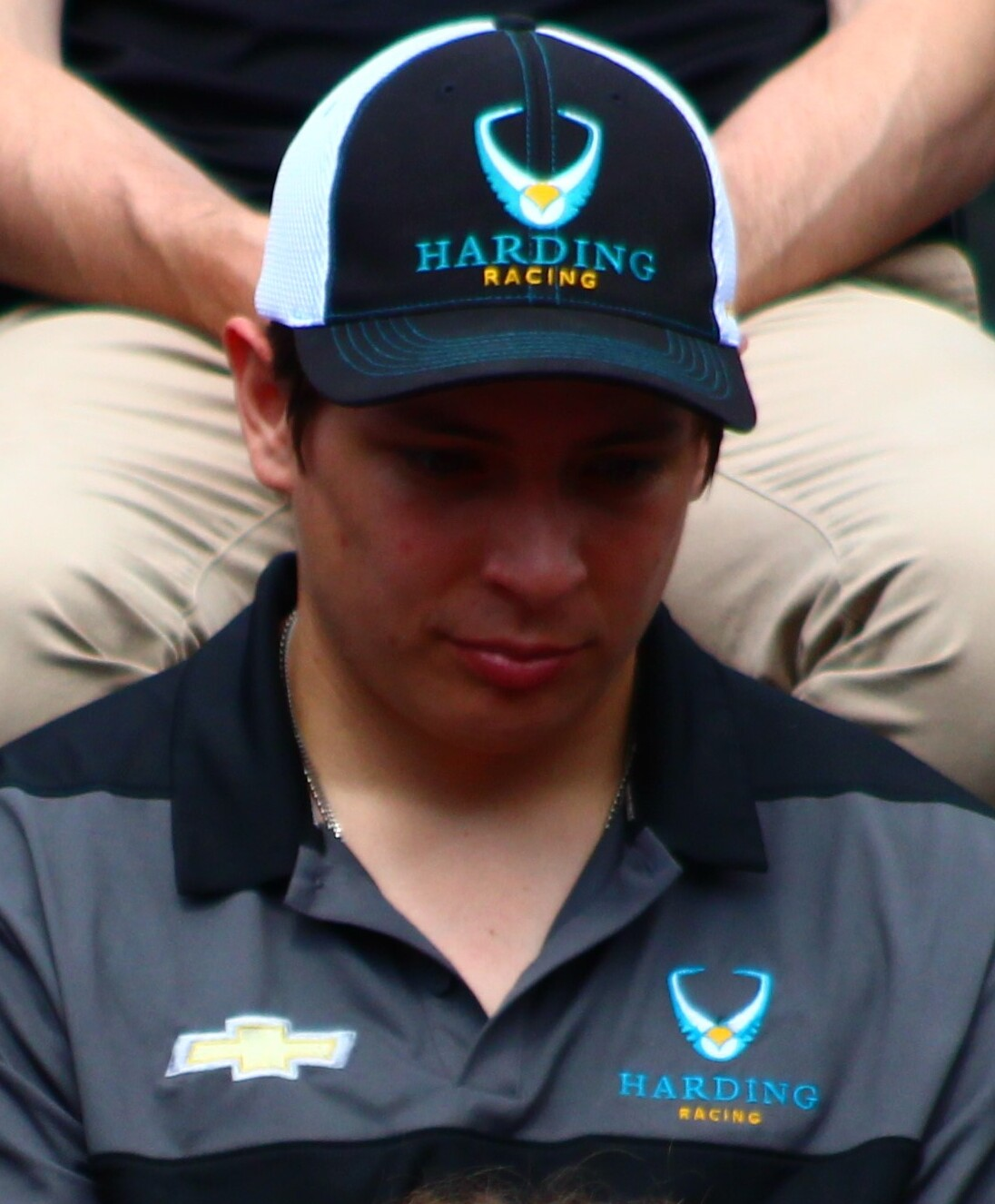
- Chaves at the Indianapolis Motor Speedway in 2018
- Nationality: (Colombia) Colombian
- Born: Gabriel Chaves; 7 July 1993 (age 33) Bogotá, Colombia
- Categorisation: FIA Gold
- Achievements: 2014 Indy Lights Champion
- Awards: 2015 IndyCar Series Rookie of the Year; 2015 Indianapolis 500 Rookie of the Year

IndyCar Series career
- 31 races run over 4 years
- 2016 position: 22nd
- Best finish: 15th (2015)
- First race: 2015 Firestone Grand Prix of St. Petersburg (St. Petersburg)
- Last race: 2018 Grand Prix of Portland (Portland)
Wins	Podiums	Poles
0	0	0
- Statistics up to date as of April 23, 2018.

Gabriel Chaves (born 7 July 1993) is a Colombian-American racing driver, currently competing in the WeatherTech SportsCar Championship and the Michelin Pilot Challenge. He raced in the IndyCar Series and is the 2014 Indy Lights Champion.

== Racing career ==
=== Early career ===
After winning several karting titles, Chaves began racing cars in 2007 in Skip Barber series in the United States. In 2008, he made his pro debut in Formula BMW Americas and finished fourth in Formula BMW Pacific and finished fourteenth in the Formula BMW World Finals. In 2009, he competed in a full season of Formula BMW Americas for Eurointernational and won the title, capturing five wins and three poles.

Chaves brought his career to Europe in 2010, where he raced in the Italian Formula Three Championship with Eurointernational. He finished tenth in points and captured rookie of the year honors. In 2011, he signed to race with the Addax Team in the GP3 Series. Chaves finished nineteenth in points with a best finish of fourth at the Valencia Street Circuit.

=== American open-wheel racing ===
In 2012, Chaves return to the United States and signed with JDC MotorSports to race in the Star Mazda Championship. Chaves finished second in points with wins at the final two races of the season at Mazda Raceway Laguna Seca and Road Atlanta. The driver climbed to the Indy Lights in 2013, having signed for Schmidt Peterson Motorsports. He was runner-up with one win and ten podiums, and was part of the closest finish in the history of the Indianapolis Motor Speedway (when Peter Dempsey grabbed the Freedom 100 victory as part of a four-wide photo finish. Dempsey finished ahead of Chaves by a mere 0.0026 seconds).

Chaves signed on with Belardi Auto Racing for the 2014 Indy Lights season and won the championship, capturing four wins (including the Freedom 100) and eleven podiums in fourteen races.

Chaves signed with Bryan Herta Autosport to race full-time at the IndyCar Series in 2015. Chaves led 31 laps at Pocono Raceway and had assumed the lead after leader and fellow rookie Sage Karam crashed, fatally injuring Justin Wilson in the process. Chaves led when the race was restarted with six laps to go but was passed for the lead. He was still on pace for his first podium finish when his engine let go with three laps remaining, bringing out a caution flag and effectively ending the race. The race was both Chaves' first laps led and only DNF of the season. Chaves captured the Rookie of the Year title by 78 points over Stefano Coletti. However, due to a sponsor default, the team was unable to retain him for the next season. The team would confirm former Caterham and Manor Racing driver Alexander Rossi to drive the No. 98 for the season.

Chaves drove part-time for Dale Coyne Racing in the 2016 season, with a best result of twelfth at Detroit race 1. In 2017, Chaves joined Harding Racing for the Indianapolis 500, Texas and Pocono races.

Chaves was appointed as driver coach for the USF Juniors, an entry-level series for the Road to Indy, ahead of the inaugural season in 2022.

=== Sports car racing ===
Chaves joined the DeltaWing entry at the four endurance races of the United SportsCar Championship in 2014. He led fifteen laps of the 10-hour finale at Road Atlanta, the Petit Le Mans, helping the team to a season-high fourth-place finish.

In 2020, Chaves joined Bryan Herta Autosport for a full season drive in the Michelin Pilot Challenge as a co-driver with Ryan Norman.

== Personal life ==
Chaves' father is a Colombian JetBlue airline pilot and Chaves has raced under both the American and Colombian flags.

== Racing record ==
=== Complete GP3 Series results ===
(key) (Races in bold indicate pole position) (Races in italics indicate fastest lap)

Year	Entrant	1	2	3	4	5	6	7	8	9	10	11	12	13	14	15	16	DC	Points
2011	Addax Team	IST; FEA; 10	IST; SPR; 12	CAT; FEA; 13	CAT; SPR; 6	VAL; FEA; 4	VAL; SPR; 5	SIL; FEA; Ret	SIL; SPR; 14	NÜR; FEA; 27†	NÜR; SPR; 17	HUN; FEA; 23	HUN; SPR; Ret	SPA; FEA; 16	SPA; SPR; 16	MNZ; FEA; 17	MNZ; SPR; 7	19th	8

=== Star Mazda Championship ===
Year	Team	1	2	3	4	5	6	7	8	9	10	11	12	13	14	15	16	17	Rank	Points
2012	JDC MotorSports	STP; 3	STP; 4	BAR; 3	BAR; 5	IND; 9	IOW; 5	TOR; 3	TOR; 4	EDM; 3	EDM; 3	TRO; 5	TRO; 2	BAL; 3	BAL; 8	LAG; 2	LAG; 1	ATL; 1	2nd	360

=== Indy Lights ===
Year	Team	1	2	3	4	5	6	7	8	9	10	11	12	13	14	Rank	Points	Ref
2013	Schmidt Peterson Motorsports	STP; 8	ALA; 3	LBH; 2	INDY; 2	MIL; 4	IOW; 2	POC; 3	TOR; 3	**MOH**; 1*	BAL; 3	HOU; 2	FON; 2			2nd	449	
2014	Belardi Auto Racing	**STP**; 2	LBH; 1	ALA; 6	ALA; 1	IND; 11	IND; 8	INDY; 1	POC; 1	TOR; 2	MOH; 2	MOH; 3	MIL; 3	SNM; 2	SNM; 2	1st	547	

=== IndyCar Series ===
(key)

Year	Team	No.	Chassis	Engine	1	2	3	4	5	6	7	8	9	10	11	12	13	14	15	16	17	Rank	Points	Ref
2015	Bryan Herta Autosport	98	Dallara DW12	Honda	STP; 17	NLA; 15	LBH; 16	ALA; 16	IMS; 15	INDY; 16	DET; 18	DET; 9	TXS; 10	TOR; 15	FON; 20	MIL; 11	IOW; 16	MOH; 12	POC; 11	SNM; 14		15th	281	
2016	Dale Coyne Racing	19	Dallara DW12	Honda	STP	PHX	LBH	ALA	IMS; 17	INDY; 20	DET; 12	DET; 13	RDA; 19	IOW; 17	TOR	MOH	POC	TXS; 14	WGL	SNM		22nd	121	
2017	Harding Racing	88	Dallara DW12	Chevrolet	STP	LBH	ALA	PHX	IMS	INDY; 9	DET	DET	TXS; 5	RDA	IOW	TOR	MOH	POC; 15	GTW	WGL	SNM	23rd	98	
2018	Harding Racing	88	Dallara DW12	Chevrolet	STP; 14	PHX; 15	LBH; 19	ALA; 17	IMS; 17	INDY; 14	DET; 18	DET; 19	TXS; 15	ROA; 19	IOW; 21	TOR	MOH	POC	GTW; 18	POR; 13	SNM	21st	187	

^{*} Season still in progress.

==== Indianapolis 500 ====
Year	Chassis	Engine	Start	Finish	Team
2015	Dallara	Honda	26	16	Bryan Herta Autosport
2016	Dallara	Honda	21	20	Dale Coyne Racing
2017	Dallara	Chevrolet	25	9	Harding Racing
2018	Dallara	Chevrolet	22	14	Harding Racing

=== IMSA SportsCar Championship ===
(key) (Races in bold indicate pole position)

Year	Entrant	Class	Make	Engine	1	2	3	4	5	6	7	8	9	10	11	Rank	Points
2014	DeltaWing Racing Cars	P	DeltaWing DWC13	Élan (Mazda) 1.9 L I4 Turbo	DAY; 16	SEB; 15	LBH	LGA	DET	WGL; 12	MOS	IMS	ELK	COA	PET; 4	25th	82
2015	DeltaWing Racing Cars with Claro/TracFone	P	DeltaWing DWC13	Élan (Mazda) 1.9 L I4 Turbo	DAY; 15	SEB	LBH	LGA	DET	WGL	MOS	ELK	COA	PET		34th	17
2016	Panoz DeltaWing Racing	P	DeltaWing DWC13	Élan (Mazda) 1.9 L I4 Turbo	DAY	SEB	LBH	LGA	DET	WGL; 7	MOS	ELK	COA	PET		30th	25
2018	Mustang Sampling Racing	P	Cadillac DPi-V.R	Cadillac 5.5 L V8	DAY	SEB	LBH	MOH	DET	WGL; 6	MOS	ELK	LGA			37th	48
2018	Whelen Engineering Racing	P	Cadillac DPi-V.R	Cadillac 5.5 L V8										PET; 8		37th	48
2020	Whelen Engineering Racing	DPi	Cadillac DPi-V.R	Cadillac 5.5 L V8	DAY	DAY; 5	SEB	ELK	ATL	MOH	PET	LGA	SEB; 6			21st	51
2021	Forty7 Motorsports	LMP3	Duqueine M30 - D08	Nissan VK56DE 5.6 L V8	DAY; 7†	SEB	MOH	WGL	WGL	ELK	PET					NC†	0†
2022	Andretti Autosport	LMP3	Ligier JS P320	Nissan VK56DE 5.6 L V8	**DAY**; 4†	SEB; 10	**MOH**; 3	WGL; 11	MOS; 2	ELK; 8	PET; 1					5th	1764
2023	Andretti Autosport	LMP3	Ligier JS P320	Nissan VK56DE 5.6 L V8	DAY; 7†	**SEB**; 9			WGL; 4	MOS					**PET**; 7	18th	810
2023	Andretti Autosport	GTD	Aston Martin Vantage AMR GT3	Aston Martin 4.0 L Turbo V8			LBH	LGA; 16			LIM; 15	ELK	VIR	IMS; 12		41st	555
2024	Andretti Motorsports	GTD	Porsche 911 GT3 R (992)	Porsche 4.2 L Flat-6	DAY; 9	SEB; 8	LBH; 9	LGA; 10	WGL; 10	MOS	ELK	VIR	IMS; 14	PET		23rd	1357

^{†} Points only counted towards the Michelin Endurance Cup, and not the overall LMP3 Championship.

Sporting positions
Preceded by Alexander Rossi	Formula BMW Americas; Champion; 2009	Succeeded by Championship disbanded
Preceded by Sage Karam	Indy Lights Champion; 2014	Succeeded by Spencer Pigot
Preceded by Carlos Muñoz	IndyCar Series; Rookie of the Year; 2015	Succeeded by Alexander Rossi
