= Ashley Freiberg =

American racing driver

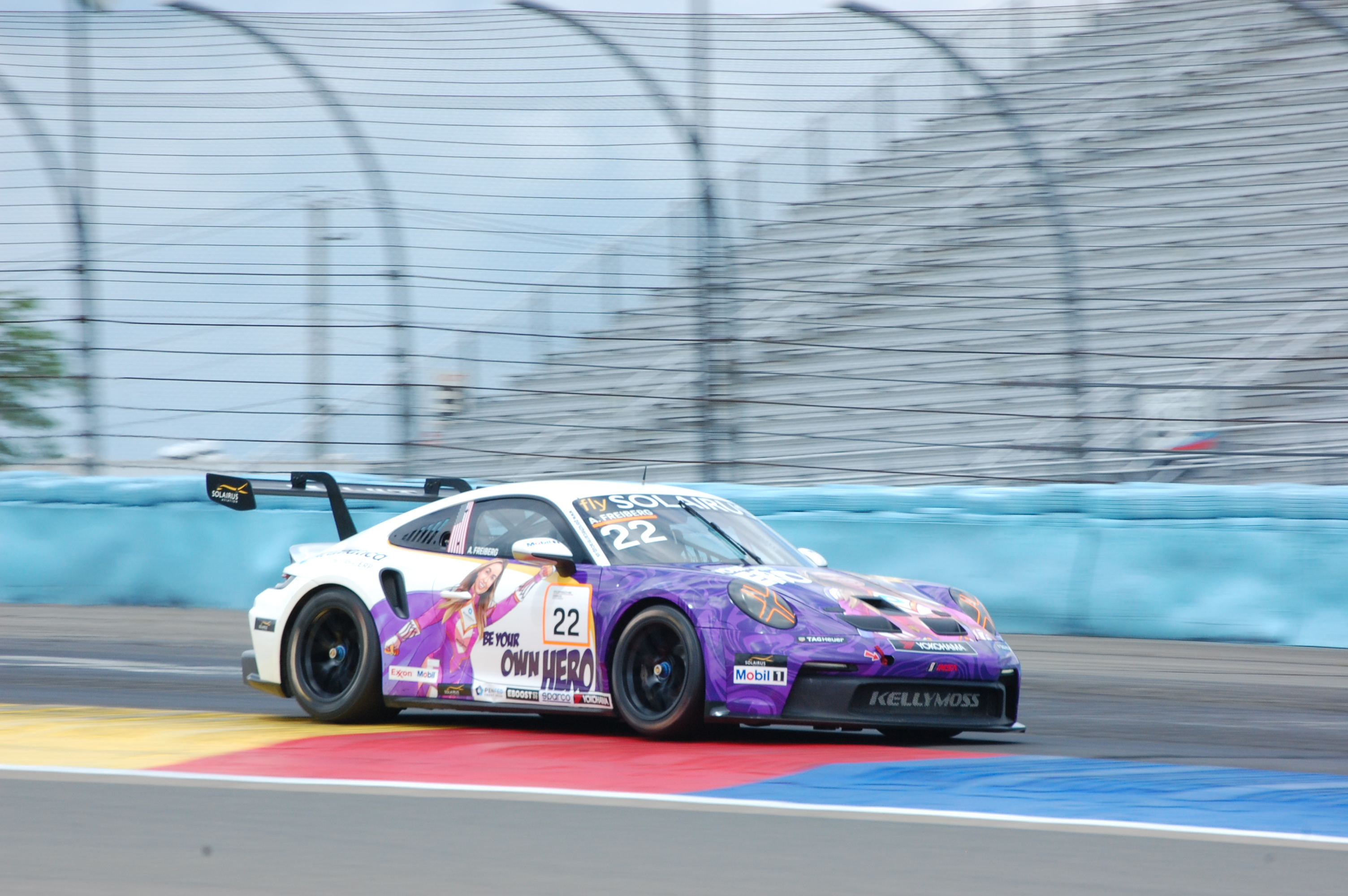
- Freiberg during the Watkins Glen round of the 2025 Porsche Carrera Cup North America
- Nationality: American
- Born: Ashley Lynn Freiberg; November 22, 1991 (age 34) Homer Glen, Illinois, U.S.

IMSA SportsCar Championship career
- Debut season: 2016
- Starts: 6
- Championships: 0
- Wins: 0
- Podiums: 1
- Poles: 0
- Fastest laps: 0

Previous series
- 2014–2015, 2018 2017 2013 2010–2012 2008–2011: Continental Tire SportsCar Challenge; Lamborghini Super Trofeo North America; IMSA GT3 Cup Challenge; Star Mazda Championship; Skip Barber Racing

Ashley Lynn Freiberg (born November 22, 1991) is an American racing driver who has competed in open-wheel, sports car and endurance racing. She became the first woman to win a Skip Barber Racing championship title in 2010, and the first female to claim outright race victories in the IMSA GT3 Cup Challenge and the Continental Tire SportsCar Challenge in 2013 and 2014, respectively.

After working as a timing and scoring official at her local kart track, Freiberg began karting at 13, achieving early success by winning five championships. She later progressed to car racing in Skip Barber and Formula Mazda, winning 25 races and two series titles in the former in 2010. Funding issues caused Freiberg to drop out of Skip Barber after four wins in 2011, but she later drove for JDC MotorSports in the 2012 Star Mazda Championship, finishing ninth in the points standings.

Freiberg moved to sports car racing in 2013, entering the IMSA GT3 Cup Challenge before moving to the Continental Tire SportsCar Challenge in 2014 and 2015, earning two outright victories. She debuted in the IMSA SportsCar Championship in 2016, running a partial schedule in the Prototype Challenge and Grand Touring Daytona (GTD) categories. Her best finish was second in GTD at the 12 Hours of Sebring, taking class and outright podiums for DAC Motorsports in the 2017 Lamborghini Super Trofeo North America Championship.

== Personal life ==
Freiberg was born on November 22, 1991, and raised in Homer Glen, Illinois. She is the daughter of Chuck and Donna Freiberg; no members of her family had any prior involvement in auto racing. Freiberg is a 2010 graduate of Lockport Township High School; she graduated early due to a good academic performance. Freiberg does cyclo-cross, hiking, rock climbing, and skate skiing in the mountains of Vermont to prepare herself for auto racing events.

== Biography ==
=== Karting (2004–2008) ===
Freiberg's earliest racing experience came at the age of ten, when both her elder brothers took up the hobby. At the time, she did not believe girls could compete, but after skateboarding, playing basketball and soccer and studying karate, she was attracted to racing. At the age of 11, she acted as a timing and scoring official at a local kart track. Freiberg made her go-karting debut at the age of 13, and her father took her to the Jim Hall Karting School in Ventura, California in 2004. In December 2004, Freiberg made her national debut in a World Karting Association (WKA) event at Daytona International Speedway's road course. Her father supported her financially. In her first season, Freiberg finished fourth overall in the regional Championship Enduro Series (CES) and seventh overall in the national WKA points standings in 2005. In 2006, she raced in the Junior Sprint category because she was too young to progress to other classes. Freiberg took her first race wins in regional and national karting series, and went undefeated in CES, winning two championship titles. She also won her first WKA title in 2006 and two more karting championships over the next two years.

=== Junior open-wheel racing (2007–2012) ===
Freiberg's achievements in karting led to her enrollment in both the two and three-day Advanced Skip Barber Race Schools in Daytona, beginning her open-wheel racing career. Soon after, she also joined Lyn St. James's Women in the Winner's Circle Driver Development Academy in Phoenix, Arizona, setting for herself the goal of reaching the IndyCar Series. In 2007, Freiberg finished fourth in her debut Skip Barber race, finishing six times in the podium and taking nine more top-five finishes during the 2008 Skip Barber season. Freiberg placed fourth in her debut Formula Mazda race in 2008, and Mazda Motorsports invited her to enter a round of the Skip Barber National Championship, in which she finished sixth. In 2009, Freiberg won the races held at Sebring International Raceway, Road America, Road Atlanta and the Carolina Motorsports Park. Freiberg also raced in the 2009 Skip Barber National Championship, becoming the first woman to claim a podium finish in that race and placing sixth overall in the points standings.

In mid-2009, Freiberg drove in both of the Autobahn Country Club races in the Star Mazda Championship for Team GDT. She won 25 Skip Barber races and two series championships in 2010, making her the first woman to win an overall Barber Series title and a Skip Barber National Championship race. In addition, Freiberg was the first woman to win a Skip Barber National Series feature race at the New Jersey Motorsports Park, and the first to take a race victory in the Skip Barber Mazda MX-5 Sedan Championship. She also finished fifth for Team GDT in the 2010 Star Mazda Championship race at Autobahn Country Club. Freiberg's results over the course of the season led to her receiving the Coach's Choice Award as "the best all-round driver in the series." She was also the second woman after Danica Patrick to earn a nomination for the Team USA Scholarship that year.

Freiberg won four races in 2011 before she was required to withdraw from racing due to funding issues. As a result, she visited race tracks and spoke to team owners who declared an interest in her through various channels because she was unable to employ a publicist. Towards the end of 2011, Freiberg was contacted by an official from TrueStar's driver development program Women Empowered Initiative, which had watched her compete in the Skip Barber championship season. This led to JDC MotorSports signing her for the full 2012 Star Mazda Championship, partnering her with Juan Piedrahita. Although she entered the series with the goal of finishing in the top-five or on the podium, Freiberg frequently changed her expectations over the course of the season. She took six top-ten finishes, with a sixth place at the Grand Prix of Baltimore being her best result of the season. Freiberg was 11th in the final points standings.

=== Sports car and endurance racing (2013–present) ===
Although she desired another season in the Star Mazda Championship before switching to Indy Lights, Freiberg researched the possibility of driving sports cars, and competed for EFFORT Racing in the 2013 GT3 Cup Challenge. At the season-opening round at Sebring, she twice finished in the overall top-five, and took second place outright in the first Laguna Seca race, tying Madison Snow for the championship lead. On June 29, Freiberg became the first woman to win a North American GT3 Cup Challenge race outright in the Platinum Cup class, leading every lap of the Watkins Glen International round. She was also the second female class winner after Melanie Snow at the 2009 Sebring race. The victory allowed Freiberg to break her tie with Madison Snow for the championship, leading by four points. After an accident during a qualifying race at the Canadian Tire Motorsport Park, EFFORT Racing terminated her contract for unspecified reasons. Frieberg was named a Faces in the Crowd by Sports Illustrated that year.

Freiberg began competing on a race-by-race basis in the Continental Tire SportsCar Challenge in 2014, sharing the No. 48 Fall-Line Motorsports BMW M3 Grand Sport (GS) car with Shelby Blackstock as she struggled to find sponsorship for a full-time seat. Freiberg and Blackstock won the season-opening BMW Performance 200 after the International Motor Sports Association (IMSA) disqualified the No. 96 Turner Motorsport BMW M3 for a technical infringement. This made her the first woman in series history to win a race overall, and the first outright at Daytona International Speedway. Freiberg participated in four more races until her sponsorship money ran out. She was named a BMW North America Scholarship Driver in 2015 and rejoined Fall-Line Motorsports, who partnered her with Trent Hindman in the No. 46 BMW M3 GS car in the Continental Tire SportsCar Challenge. After poor results in the season's first three events, the duo finished second at the rain-affected Watkins Glen round, finishing third overall at Road America, and winning outright at the season-ending Road Atlanta race. Freiberg was eighth in the GS drivers' championship, garnering 226 points.

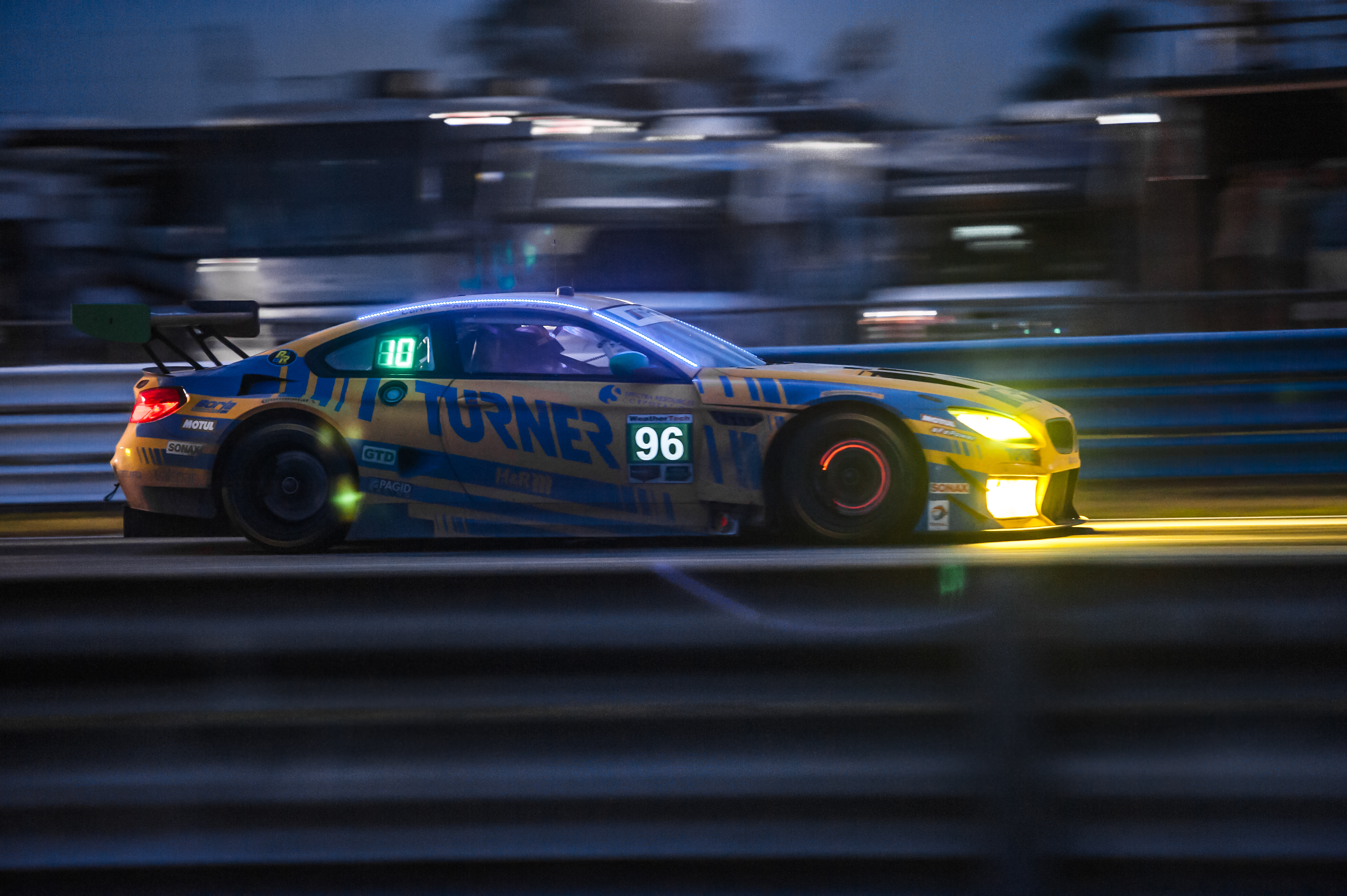
The No. 96 Turner Motorsports BMW that Freiberg shared with Jens Klingmann and Bret Curtis en route to second in her class at the 2016 12 Hours of Sebring.

Freiberg co-drove Turner Motorsport's No. 96 BMW M3 Grand Touring Daytona (GTD) car in the 2016 IMSA SportsCar Championship North American Endurance Cup, and shared the No. 88 Starworks Motorsport Oreca FLM09 Prototype Challenge (PC) car with Mark Kvamme for the sprint races. She debuted at the season-opening 24 Hours of Daytona alongside Jens Klingmann, Bret Curtis and Marco Wittmann, finishing 22nd in the GTD class and 48th overall after multiple technical problems. During the Daytona race weekend, Freiberg earned support from the FIA Women in Motorsport Commission, making her the first North American female driver to receive recognition from the racing governing body. Two months later, she, Klingmann and Curtis finished a season-high second in the GTD class and 23rd overall at the 12 Hours of Sebring. Freiberg and Kvamme finished seventh in the PC class at both Long Beach and Laguna Seca and fifth at Belle Isle. After sitting out the mid-season races, she returned to drive for Turner Motorsports alongside Klingmann and Curtis at the season-ending Petit Le Mans, retiring before the race ended and being classified 10th in class.

After spending months locating sponsors to fund her career, Freiberg signed for DAC Motorsports to drive select races of the 2017 Lamborghini Super Trofeo North America Championship after she was contacted by the team in May that year. She took two consecutive third-place pro class finishes at the Circuit of the Americas, and was third overall at Watkins Glen. This achievement made Freiberg the first woman to stand on the overall podium in any of Lamborghini's Super Trofeo global series. In the opening round of the 2018 Continental Tire SportsCar Challenge, the BMW Endurance at Daytona, she and Audi Sport TT Cup driver Gosia Rdest formed the first all-female team in the GS class. The duo drove the No. 50 RHC-GMG Racing Audi R8 LMS GT4, finishing 23rd overall after Freiberg's progress into the top five was halted by Austin Cindric, who hit the car early in the race. In December 2018, Freiberg shared a Shift Up Now-entered BMW E30 with Lynn Kehoe, Kristina Esposito, Mandy McGee, and Karen Salvaggio in an all-female team at the 2018 25 Hours of Thunderhill, finishing second in class and 25th overall. (Note: She was initially due to drive a 2016 Mazda MX-5 with Pippa Mann, Sarah Montgomery, Amy Dilks, and Shea Holbrook.)

Freiberg competed in the second endurance race of the 2020 Michelin Pilot Challenge alongside co-driver Ryan Nash in the GS-class M1 Racing McLaren 570S GT4 at Road Atlanta in September 2020. Freiberg retired after completing 88 laps. For the season-ending round at Road Atlanta, Freiberg and Nash drove a Porsche 718 Cayman GT4 sourced by M1 Racing from Volt Racing after their McLaren was damaged beyond repair following an accident caused by brake failure. The pair finished the race in 14th position. She was enrolled onto the All-In program that aimed to promote diversity and inclusiveness in auto racing by tire maker Yokohama and she drove the No. 122 MDK Motorsports Porsche 991 GT3 Cup car in the 991 category during the 2023 Porsche Sprint Challenge North America. Freiberg won the class title with seven victories and twelve podiums for a points total of 671 over the 14-race season.

Freiberg returned to Porsche Sprint Challenge North America for the 2024 season, staying at MDK Motorsports before joining the Kellymoss team midway through the campaign. Freiberg completed the season in third place in the 992 Pro-Am championship standings with 604 points and six podium finishes that included one victory at the Circuit of the Americas. She progressed to the highest-tier in the one make Porsche racing series ladder, the Porsche Carrera Cup North America, remaining with the Kellymoss team for the 2025 season. Freiberg became a member of the Porsche Female Driver Program.

== In the media ==
Freiberg is the subject of the three-part MAVTV documentary series "In the Machine: Ashley Freiberg" in 2024.

== Racing record ==
=== Star Mazda Championship ===
(key) (Small number denotes finishing position; † indicates that the driver was ineligible to score points)

Year	Team	1	2	3	4	5	6	7	8	9	10	11	12	13	14	15	16	17	Rank	Points	Ref
2009	Team GDT	SEB	VIR	MMP	NJ1	NJ2	WIS	IOW	ILL; 20	ILL; 18	QUE	ONT	ATL	LAG					N/A	N/A†	
2010	Team GDT	SEB	STP	LAG	IRP	IOW	NJ1	NJ2	ACC; 5	ACC; 19	TRO	ROA	MOS	ATL					N/A	N/A†	
2012	JDC MotorSports	STP; 9	STP; 19	BAR; 11	BAR; 11	IND; 15	IOW; 10	TOR; 13	TOR; 13	EDM; 15	EDM; 7	TRO; 12	TRO; 9	BAL; 6	BAL; 10	LAG; 12	LAG; 18	ATL; 11	11th	162	

==== IMSA SportsCar Championship ====
(key) (Small numbers denotes finishing position; † indicates that the driver was ineligible to score points for not completing enough laps of a race)

Year	Entrant	Class	Make	Engine	1	2	3	4	5	6	7	8	9	10	11	Pos.	Pts
2016	Turner Motorsport	GTD	BMW M6 GT3	BMW 4.4 L V8	DAY; 22	SEB; 2†									PET; 9†	62nd	12
2016	Starworks Motorsport	PC	Oreca FLM09	Chevrolet LS3 6.2 L V8			LBH; 5	LGA; 7	DET; 6	WGL	MOS	LIM	ELK	COA		16th	78

==== 24 Hours of Daytona ====
24 Hours of Daytona results
Year	Class	No.	Team	Car	Co-drivers	Laps	Position	Class Pos.
2016	GTD	96	Turner Motorsports	BMW 4.4 L Turbo V8	Jens Klingmann; Bret Curtis; Marco Wittmann	628	22nd	48th

==== 12 Hours of Sebring ====
Year	Team	Co-Drivers	Car	Class	Laps	Pos.	Class Pos.
2016	Turner Motorsports	Jens Klingmann; Bret Curtis	BMW 4.4 L Turbo V8	GTD	229	23rd	2nd
