= 2012 Star Mazda Championship =

Seasons
- ← 2011 2013 →

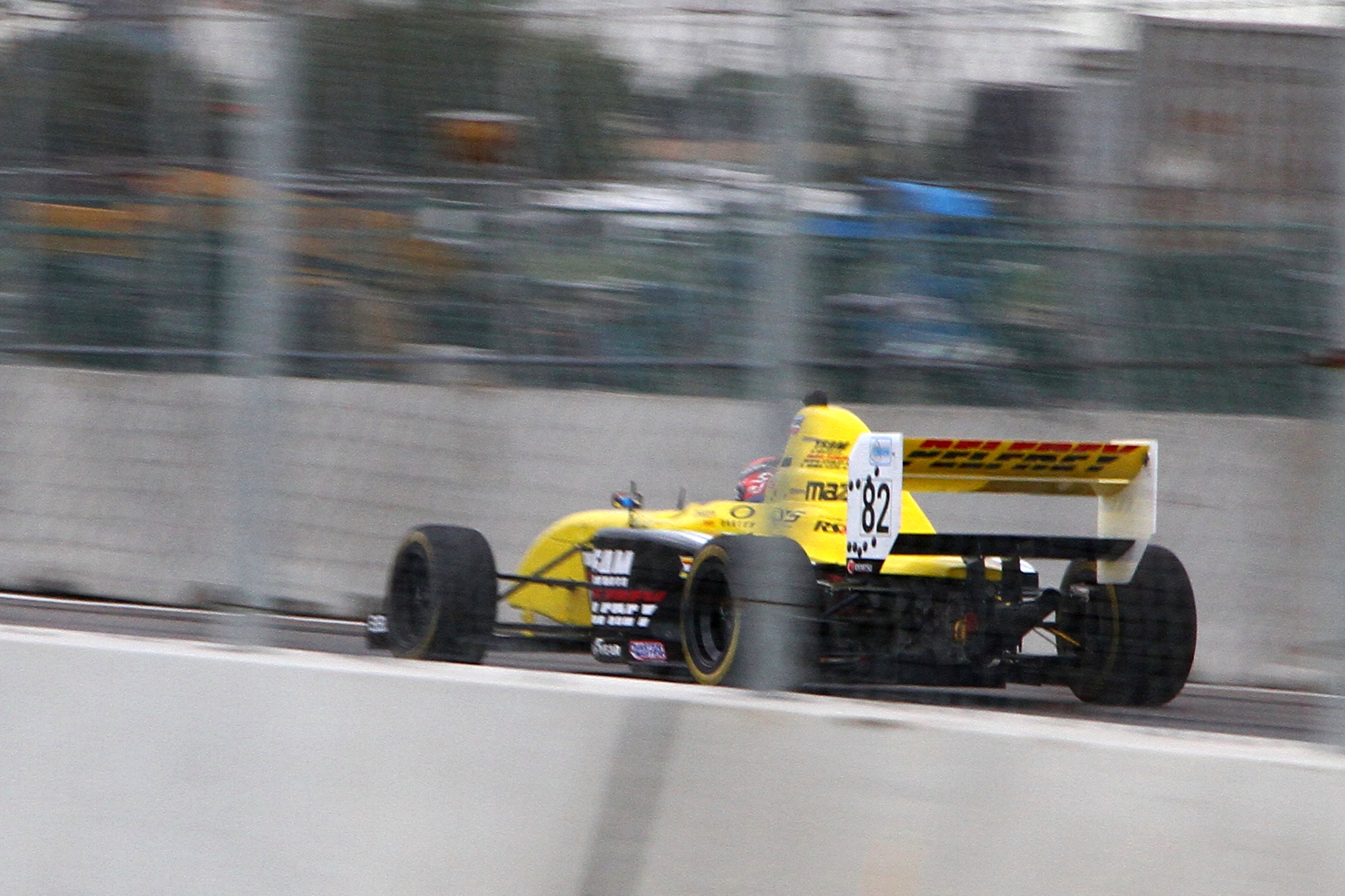
2012 champion Jack Hawksworth

The 2012 Star Mazda Championship was the 14th season of the Star Mazda Championship, an American-based open-wheel racing series sanctioned by IndyCar as part of the Road to Indy program. It featured 17 races held over 10 race weekends. Five race weekends were held on temporary street courses, three on permanent road courses, and two on ovals. The series increased the number of double-header weekends to reduce the costs per race for competitors. Fastest lap times in race 1 determined the starting grid for race 2 on double-header race weekends.

The championship consisted of a main championship as well as a Star Mazda Expert Series for drivers over 30 years old. The expert class consists of a driver's best 10 races, enabling an Expert Series competitor to complete a full complement of races in just five race weekends.

21-year-old Englishman Jack Hawksworth driving for Team Pelfrey dominated the championship, winning eight of the 17 races and four of the eight poles awarded, setting a series record for wins in a season. He sat out the final race of the year but still won the championship over Colombian-American Gabby Chaves by 37 points. Chaves won the final two races of the season. American Sage Karam won three races and finished third in points in a tie-breaker over fellow American Connor De Phillippi who won two races after finishing second in points a year ago. Finn Petri Suvanto finished fifth in points, in his first season in Star Mazda, winning the seat by winning the Road to Indy's U.S. F2000 National Championship the year before. Other race winners were Chile's Martin Scuncio and Venezuela's Camilo Schmidt, who won a bizarre wet-dry race in Edmonton.

American Walt Bowlin won the Expert series championship by virtue of being the only Expert series competitor to participate in more than two race weekends.

== Drivers and teams ==
Team	No.	Drivers	Notes
(United States) Juncos Racing	2	(United States) Connor De Phillippi	
(United States) Juncos Racing	15	(Venezuela) Bruno Palli	
(United States) Juncos Racing	22	(Chile) Martin Scuncio	Skipped Road Atlanta
(United States) Juncos Racing	57	(Venezuela) Diego Ferreira	
(United States) JDC MotorSports	9	(Colombia) Juan Piedrahita	
(United States) JDC MotorSports	16	(United States) Lloyd Read	Laguna Seca only
(United States) JDC MotorSports	16	(United States) Scott Anderson	Road Atlanta only
(United States) JDC MotorSports	19	(Colombia) Gabby Chaves	
(United States) JDC MotorSports	91	(United States) Ashley Freiberg	
(United States) JDC MotorSports	99	(Canada) Stefan Rzadzinski	Skipped Indianapolis, Iowa, Trois-Rivières, Laguna Seca, and Road Atlanta
(Canada) The Racing Company	10	(Canada) Jérimy Daniel	Skipped Indianapolis, Iowa and Edmonton
(United States) World Speed Motorsports	18	(United States) Kyle Kaiser	Laguna Seca only
(Venezuela) Linares Racing	20	(Venezuela) Carlos Linares	
(Venezuela) Linares Racing	21	(Venezuela) Camilo Schmidt	Skipped Trois-Rivières
(Canada) AIM Autosport	23	(United States) Walt Bowlin	Expert series; skipped Indianapolis, Iowa, Edmonton and Trois-Rivières
(Canada) AIM Autosport	66	(Canada) Zack Meyer	
(Canada) AIM Autosport	72	(United States) Larry Pegram	Expert series; St. Pete and Barber only
(United States) Team GDT	33	(United States) Ryan Tveter	Skipped Barber, Indianapolis, and Iowa
(United States) Team GDT	39	(United States) Cory Lewis	Toronto only
(United States) Team GDT	51	(United States) Alex Ardoin	Trois-Rivières only
(United States) Team GDT	53	(Colombia) Andrés Méndez	
(United States) Team GDT	65	(United States) J. W. Roberts	Expert series; St. Pete only
(United States) Team GDT	97	(Colombia) Juan Camilo Acosta	Road Atlanta only
(Canada) Robertshaw Racing	42	(Canada) Blair Robertshaw	Expert series; Edmonton only
(United States) Andretti Autosport	77	(United States) Zach Veach	
(United States) Andretti Autosport	88	(United States) Sage Karam	
(United States) Team Pelfrey	81	(Finland) Petri Suvanto	
(United States) Team Pelfrey	82	(United Kingdom) Jack Hawksworth	Skipped Road Atlanta
(United States) Team Pelfrey	82	(United States) Ryan Tveter	Road Atlanta only
(United States) Team Pelfrey	83	(United States) Gustavo Menezes	

== Race calendar and results ==
The series schedule was announced December 1, 2011. Two race weekends were listed on the schedule with the location yet to be determined. The season finale was later confirmed to be held at Road Atlanta, supporting the Petit Le Mans sportscar event.

Rnd	Circuit	Location	Date	Pole position	Fastest lap	Winning driver	Winning team	Supporting
1	Streets of St. Petersburg	St. Petersburg, Florida	March 24	(United States) Connor De Phillippi	(United Kingdom) Jack Hawksworth	(United States) Connor De Phillippi	(United States) Juncos Racing	IndyCar Series
2	Streets of St. Petersburg	St. Petersburg, Florida	March 25		(United Kingdom) Jack Hawksworth	(United Kingdom) Jack Hawksworth	(United States) Team Pelfrey	IndyCar Series
3	Barber Motorsports Park	Birmingham, Alabama	April 1	(United Kingdom) Jack Hawksworth	(United Kingdom) Jack Hawksworth	(United Kingdom) Jack Hawksworth	(United States) Team Pelfrey	IndyCar Series
4	Barber Motorsports Park	Birmingham, Alabama	April 1		(United Kingdom) Jack Hawksworth	(Chile) Martin Scuncio	(United States) Juncos Racing	IndyCar Series
5	Lucas Oil Raceway at Indianapolis	Brownsburg, Indiana	May 26	(United States) Connor De Phillippi	(United States) Connor De Phillippi	(United States) Connor De Phillippi	(United States) Juncos Racing	USAC Midgets
6	Iowa Speedway	Newton, Iowa	June 23	(United States) Sage Karam	(United States) Sage Karam	(United States) Sage Karam	(United States) Andretti Autosport	IndyCar Series
7	Streets of Toronto	Toronto, Ontario	July 7	(United Kingdom) Jack Hawksworth	(United Kingdom) Jack Hawksworth	(United Kingdom) Jack Hawksworth	(United States) Team Pelfrey	IndyCar Series
8	Streets of Toronto	Toronto, Ontario	July 8		(United Kingdom) Jack Hawksworth	(United Kingdom) Jack Hawksworth	(United States) Team Pelfrey	IndyCar Series
9	Edmonton City Centre Airport	Edmonton, Alberta	July 21	(United States) Sage Karam	(United Kingdom) Jack Hawksworth	(Venezuela) Camilo Schmidt	(Venezuela) Linares Racing	IndyCar Series
10	Edmonton City Centre Airport	Edmonton, Alberta	July 22		(United Kingdom) Jack Hawksworth	(United Kingdom) Jack Hawksworth	(United States) Team Pelfrey	IndyCar Series
11	Circuit Trois-Rivières	Trois-Rivières, Quebec	August 4	(United Kingdom) Jack Hawksworth	(United Kingdom) Jack Hawksworth	(United Kingdom) Jack Hawksworth	(United States) Team Pelfrey	Indy Lights
12	Circuit Trois-Rivières	Trois-Rivières, Quebec	August 5		(United Kingdom) Jack Hawksworth	(United States) Sage Karam	(United States) Andretti Autosport	Indy Lights
13	Streets of Baltimore	Baltimore, Maryland	September 1	Qualifying abandoned	(United Kingdom) Jack Hawksworth	(United Kingdom) Jack Hawksworth	(United States) Team Pelfrey	IndyCar Series
14	Streets of Baltimore	Baltimore, Maryland	September 2		(United States) Sage Karam	(United States) Sage Karam	(United States) Andretti Autosport	IndyCar Series
15	Mazda Raceway Laguna Seca	Monterey, California	September 8	(United Kingdom) Jack Hawksworth	(Colombia) Gabby Chaves	(United Kingdom) Jack Hawksworth	(United States) Team Pelfrey	Rolex Sports Car Series
16	Mazda Raceway Laguna Seca	Monterey, California	September 9		(Colombia) Gabby Chaves	(Colombia) Gabby Chaves	(United States) JDC MotorSports	Rolex Sports Car Series
17	Road Atlanta	Braselton, Georgia	October 19	(Colombia) Gabby Chaves	(United States) Sage Karam	(Colombia) Gabby Chaves	(United States) JDC MotorSports	American Le Mans Series

== Championship standings ==
=== Drivers' ===
Pos	Driver	STP (United States)		BAR (United States)		IND (United States)	IOW (United States)	TOR (Canada)		EDM (Canada)		TRO (Canada)		BAL (United States)		LAG (United States)		ATL (United States)	Points
Overall
1	(United Kingdom) Jack Hawksworth	2	**1**	**1**	**2**	7	15	**1**	**1**	7	**1**	**1**	**12**	**1**	**2**	**1**	2		397
2	(Colombia) Gabby Chaves	3	4	3	5	9	5	3	4	3	3	5	2	3	8	2	**1**	**1**	360
3	(United States) Sage Karam	8	7	2	12	2	**1**	21	3	**2**	2	2	1	15	1	7	19	2	325
4	(United States) Connor De Phillippi	**1**	5	5	3	**1**	3	7	16	6	13	3	13	2	3	3	3	3	325
5	(Finland) Petri Suvanto	5	3	6	6	5	4	6	8	19	4	14	4	4	4	5	5	6	271
6	(Venezuela) Diego Ferreira	7	9	9	7	10	8	5	5	10	11	16	15	5	5	4	4	4	235
7	(Colombia) Juan Piedrahita	4	2	8	4	8	14	4	2	8	16	9	11	19	9	8	9	9	234
8	(Chile) Martin Scuncio	6	6	4	1	4	2	17	7	4	15	6	5	18	17	9	11		232
9	(United States) Gustavo Menezes	13	10	7	16	6	13	8	6	13	5	7	6	7	16	6	8	7	208
10	(United States) Zach Veach	17	11	15	10	3	6	2	17	9	17	8	8	8	6	11	17	8	199
11	(United States) Ashley Freiberg	9	19	11	11	15	10	13	13	15	7	12	9	6	10	12	18	11	162
12	(Venezuela) Bruno Palli	14	15	13	20	14	7	10	15	18	12	10	17	10	7	20	10	5	146
13	(Venezuela) Camilo Schmidt	12	18	17	9	13	12	19	18	1	9			17	14	19	6	16	129
14	(Colombia) Andrés Méndez	15	14	14	17	12	11	18	10	11	DSQ	13	7	12	18	15	15	15	128
15	(Canada) Zack Meyer	19	13	19	19	16	9	9	9	16	18	15	18	13	15	18	12	10	114
16	(Canada) Stefan Rzadzinski	10	8	10	8			11	12	17	6			9	11				108
17	(Venezuela) Carlos Linares	20	12	12	14	11	DNS	15	14	14	8	11	16	16	19	14	20		106
18	(United States) Ryan Tveter	21	21					20	20	5	10	18	10	11	12	16	14	14	91
19	(United States) Walt Bowlin	18	17	18	18			16	19					14	13	17	16	17	55
20	(Canada) Jérimy Daniel	11	20	20	15			14	11			17	14						49
21	(United States) Larry Pegram	16	16	16	13														23
22	(Canada) Blair Robertshaw									12	14								16
	(United States) J. W. Roberts	DNS	DNS																0
Ineligible drivers
	(United States) Alex Ardoin											4	3						0
	(United Kingdom) Lloyd Read															10	7		0
	(United States) Corey Lewis							12	21										0
	(United States) Scott Anderson																	12	0
	(United States) Kyle Kaiser															13	13		0
	(Colombia) Juan Camilo Acosta																	13	0
Expert Series
1	(United States) Walt Bowlin	18	17	18	18			16	19					14	13	17	16	17	142
2	(United States) Larry Pegram	16	16	16	14														56
3	(Canada) Blair Robertshaw									12	14								28
	(United States) J. W. Roberts	DNS	DNS																0
Pos	Driver	STP (United States)		BAR (United States)		IND (United States)	IOW (United States)	TOR (Canada)		EDM (Canada)		TRO (Canada)		BAL (United States)		LAG (United States)		ATL (United States)	Points

Color	Result
Gold	Winner
Silver	2nd place
Bronze	3rd place
Green	4th & 5th place
Light Blue	6th–10th place
Dark Blue	Finished (Outside Top 10)
Purple	Did not finish
Red	Did not qualify (DNQ)
Brown	Withdrawn (Wth)
Black	Disqualified (DSQ)
White	Did not start (DNS)
Blank	Did not participate (DNP)
Blank	Not competing

**In-line notation**
**Bold**	Pole position (1 point)
Italics	Ran fastest race lap (1 point)

Position	1	2	3	4	5	6	7	8	9	10	11	12	13	14	15	16	17	18	19	20
Overall points	29	25	22	19	17	15	14	13	12	11	10	9	8	7	6	5	4	3	2	1

=== Teams' ===
Pos	Team	Points
1	(United States) Team Pelfrey	451
2	(United States) Juncos Racing	416
3	(United States) JDC MotorSports	401
4	(United States) Andretti Autosport	349
5	(United States) Team GDT	195
6	(Venezuela) Linares Racing	188
7	(Canada) AIM Autosport	161
8	(Canada) The Racing Company	76
9	(United States) World Speed Motorsports	24
