= Zack Meyer =

Canadian racing driver from Toronto (born 1992)

Zack Meyer (born August 4, 1992) is a Canadian racing driver from Toronto.

After karting, Meyer moved straight into the Star Mazda Championship for a one-off appearance in 2010. He made two appearances in 2011 for AIM Autosport. He raced a full season for AIM Autosport in 2012 and finished 15th in points with a best finish of ninth (three times). He returned to the series in 2013, which had changed its name to the Pro Mazda Championship. Meyer moved to JDC MotorSports and improved to sixth in the championship with a best finish of fourth in his hometown Toronto race. Meyer will move up the Indy Lights competition in 2014 driving for Team Moore Racing.

== Racing record ==
=== Star Mazda Championship / Pro Mazda Championship ===
Year	Team	1	2	3	4	5	6	7	8	9	10	11	12	13	14	15	16	17	Rank	Points
2011	AIM Autosport	STP; 12	BAR; 12	IND	MIL	IOW	MOS	TRO	TRO	SON	BAL	LAG							18th	48
2012	AIM Autosport	STP; 19	STP; 13	BAR; 19	BAR; 19	IND; 16	IOW; 9	TOR; 9	TOR; 9	EDM; 16	EDM; 18	TRO; 15	TRO; 18	BAL; 13	BAL; 15	LAG; 18	LAG; 12	ATL; 10	15th	114
2013	JDC MotorSports	COA; 7	COA; 7	STP; 6	STP; 7	LOR; 8	MIL; 8	TOR; 11	TOR; 4	MOS; 7	MOS; 5	MOH; 13	MOH; 7	TRO; 11	TRO; 6	HOU; 10	HOU; 13		6th	209

=== Indy Lights ===
Year	Team	1	2	3	4	5	6	7	8	9	10	11	12	13	14	Rank	Points	Ref
2014	Team Moore Racing	STP; 8	LBH; 10	ALA; 9	ALA; 8	IND; 4	IND; 10	INDY; 10	POC	TOR; 10	MOH; 7	MOH; 10	MIL	SNM; 9	SNM; 8	9th	274	

^{*} Season still in progress.
