= 2014 Indy Lights =

29th season of the Indy Lights racing series

2014 Indy Lights season
- Indy Lights

Season
- Races: 14
- Start date: March 30
- End date: August 24

Awards
- Drivers' champion: (Colombia) Gabby Chaves
- Teams' champion: (United States) Schmidt Peterson Motorsports
- Rookie of the Year: (United Kingdom) Jack Harvey

The 2014 Indy Lights season, named Indy Lights Presented by Cooper Tires, was a season of open wheel motor racing. It was the 29th season of the Indy Lights series and the 13th sanctioned by IndyCar, acting as the primary support series for the IndyCar Series. It began March 30, 2014 in St. Petersburg. The 2014 season was the first promoted by Andersen Promotions, who also promotes the other steps on the Mazda Road to Indy.

It was the final season for the Dallara IPS/Infiniti V8 chassis and engine package that debuted in 2002. A new chassis, to be built by Dallara, will be introduced for 2015 along with an AER turbocharged 4-cylinder engine. 2014 was also the first season with Cooper Tire as the sole tire supplier, replacing Firestone who had supplied tires to the series for its entire previous existence.

It was a season with a very low number of entries, with the Grand Prix races having between 8 and 12 drivers at most.

Colombian-American Gabby Chaves, driving for Belardi Auto Racing captured the championship on the second tie-breaker over Schmidt Peterson Motorsports rookie Jack Harvey.

Early on, the season appeared to be a two-horse race between Chaves and Andretti Autosport's Zach Veach. However, a late-season charge by Harvey put him within striking distance of the championship. Harvey did not capture his first win until the tenth race of the season. However, Chaves managed a second-place finish in the final race of the season behind Harvey in first. Chaves and Harvey tied on points and on the first tie-breaker number of wins with four each. Chaves captured the championship by having five second-place finishes to Harvey's one. Despite a season of low car-counts where only eight drivers competed in all 14 races, six different drivers captured victories. In addition to Chaves, Harvey, and Veach, other winners included Matthew Brabham and Luiz Razia who each captured their first and only wins of the season on the Indianapolis Motor Speedway road course and Belardi's Alexandre Baron – a race-winner in Toronto – who was in the championship hunt until reported visa issues forced him to leave the series.

== Team and driver chart ==
- All drivers competed in Cooper Tire–shod Dallara chassis.

Team	No.	Drivers	Rounds
Andretti Autosport	26	(United States) Zach Veach	All
Andretti Autosport	83	(Australia) Matthew Brabham	All
Belardi Auto Racing	0	(United States) Chase Austin	7
Belardi Auto Racing	4	(France) Alexandre Baron	1–7, 9
Belardi Auto Racing	4	(Zimbabwe) Axcil Jefferies	10–11
Belardi Auto Racing	4	(United States) Ryan Phinny	13–14
Belardi Auto Racing	5	(Colombia) Gabby Chaves	All
Bryan Herta Autosport; Jeffrey Mark Motorsport	28	(United Kingdom) Lloyd Read	1–6
Bryan Herta Autosport; Jeffrey Mark Motorsport	28	(United States) Ryan Phinny	9–11
Fan Force United	24	(United States) Scott Anderson	All
MDL Racing	56	(Canada) Matthew Di Leo	9
Schmidt Peterson Motorsports	7	(Brazil) Luiz Razia	All
Schmidt Peterson Motorsports	10	(Mexico) Juan Pablo García	All
Schmidt Peterson Motorsports	42	(United Kingdom) Jack Harvey	All
Schmidt Peterson Motorsports	77	(Colombia) Juan Piedrahita	All
Team Moore Racing	2	(Canada) Zack Meyer	1–7, 9–11, 13–14
Team Moore Racing	22	(Italy) Vittorio Ghirelli	1–4
Team Moore Racing	22	(United States) Jimmy Simpson	10–11

== Schedule ==
Andersen Promotions announced the 2014 Indy Lights schedule on October 24, 2013. The season consisted of 14 races held over 10 race weekends, consisting of three street circuits, three ovals, and four permanent road courses. All race weekends on permanent road courses were double-race weekends. The series returned to Sonoma Raceway for the first time since 2010. It also raced on the Indianapolis Motor Speedway road course for the first time since 2007 in support of the new Grand Prix of Indianapolis, although the track was in a different configuration than the one raced in 2007. The series did not return to Iowa Speedway, Auto Club Speedway, or Houston despite IndyCar returning to those tracks in 2014 and did not race at the Baltimore Grand Prix as that race was cancelled for 2014.

Rnd	Date	Race Name	Track	Location
1	March 30	(United States) St. Petersburg 100	Streets of St. Petersburg	St. Petersburg, Florida
2	April 13	(United States) Long Beach 100	Streets of Long Beach	Long Beach, California
3	April 26	(United States) Legacy Indy Lights 100	Barber Motorsports Park	Birmingham, Alabama
4	April 27	(United States) Legacy Indy Lights 100	Barber Motorsports Park	Birmingham, Alabama
5	May 9	(United States) Liberty Challenge	Indianapolis Motor Speedway road course	Speedway, Indiana
6	May 10	(United States) Liberty Challenge	Indianapolis Motor Speedway road course	Speedway, Indiana
7	May 23	(United States) Freedom 100	Indianapolis Motor Speedway oval	Speedway, Indiana
8	July 6	(United States) Pocono Indy Lights 100	Pocono Raceway	Long Pond, Pennsylvania
9	July 20	(Canada) Grand Prix of Toronto	Exhibition Place	Toronto, Ontario
10	August 2	(United States) Grand Prix of Mid-Ohio	Mid-Ohio Sports Car Course	Lexington, Ohio
11	August 3	(United States) Grand Prix of Mid-Ohio	Mid-Ohio Sports Car Course	Lexington, Ohio
12	August 17	(United States) Milwaukee Race	Milwaukee Mile	West Allis, Wisconsin
13	August 23	(United States) Grand Prix of Sonoma	Sonoma Raceway	Sonoma, California
14	August 24	(United States) Grand Prix of Sonoma	Sonoma Raceway	Sonoma, California

== Race results ==
Round	Race	Pole position	Fastest lap	Most laps led	Race Winner	
Round	Race	Pole position	Fastest lap	Most laps led	Driver	Team
1	St. Petersburg	(Colombia) Gabby Chaves	(Colombia) Gabby Chaves	(United States) Zach Veach	(United States) Zach Veach	Andretti Autosport
2	Long Beach	(United States) Zach Veach	(United States) Zach Veach	(Colombia) Gabby Chaves	(Colombia) Gabby Chaves	Belardi Auto Racing
3	Birmingham 1	(United States) Zach Veach	(United States) Zach Veach	(United States) Zach Veach	(United States) Zach Veach	Andretti Autosport
4	Birmingham 2	(Colombia) Gabby Chaves	(Colombia) Gabby Chaves	(Colombia) Gabby Chaves	(Colombia) Gabby Chaves	Belardi Auto Racing
5	Indianapolis GP 1	(Australia) Matthew Brabham	(Brazil) Luiz Razia	(Australia) Matthew Brabham	(Australia) Matthew Brabham	Andretti Autosport
6	Indianapolis GP 2	(Brazil) Luiz Razia	(Australia) Matthew Brabham	(Brazil) Luiz Razia	(Brazil) Luiz Razia	Schmidt Peterson Motorsports
7	Indianapolis	(Brazil) Luiz Razia	(Australia) Matthew Brabham	(Australia) Matthew Brabham	(Colombia) Gabby Chaves	Belardi Auto Racing
8	Pocono	(United States) Zach Veach	(Colombia) Gabby Chaves	(Colombia) Gabby Chaves	(Colombia) Gabby Chaves	Belardi Auto Racing
9	Toronto	(France) Alexandre Baron	(United Kingdom) Jack Harvey	(France) Alexandre Baron	(France) Alexandre Baron	Belardi Auto Racing
10	Mid-Ohio 1	(United Kingdom) Jack Harvey	(United Kingdom) Jack Harvey	(United Kingdom) Jack Harvey	(United Kingdom) Jack Harvey	Schmidt Peterson Motorsports
11	Mid-Ohio 2	(United Kingdom) Jack Harvey	(United Kingdom) Jack Harvey	(United Kingdom) Jack Harvey	(United Kingdom) Jack Harvey	Schmidt Peterson Motorsports
12	Milwaukee	(United States) Zach Veach	(United States) Zach Veach	(Australia) Matthew Brabham	(United States) Zach Veach	Andretti Autosport
13	Sonoma 1	(United Kingdom) Jack Harvey	(Colombia) Gabby Chaves	(United Kingdom) Jack Harvey	(United Kingdom) Jack Harvey	Schmidt Peterson Motorsports
14	Sonoma 2	(United Kingdom) Jack Harvey	(United Kingdom) Jack Harvey	(United Kingdom) Jack Harvey	(United Kingdom) Jack Harvey	Schmidt Peterson Motorsports

== Championship standings ==
=== Drivers' championship ===
Points system

Position	1	2	3	4	5	6	7	8	9	10	11	12
Points	50	40	35	32	30	28	26	24	22	20	18	16

- Drivers had to complete 50% of the race distance in order to score full points, otherwise 1 point was awarded.

Pos	Driver	STP (United States)	LBH (United States)	ALA (United States)		IND (United States)		INDY (United States)	POC (United States)	TOR (Canada)	MOH (United States)		MIL (United States)	SNM (United States)		Pts
1	(Colombia) Gabby Chaves	**2**^{1}	1*	6	**1***	11	8	1	1*	2	2	3	3	2	2	547
2	(United Kingdom) Jack Harvey RY	3	4	3	5	3	2	5	3	3	**1***	**1***	5	**1***	**1***	547
3	(United States) Zach Veach	1*	**2**	**1***	3	9	7	3	**2**	5	4	2	**1**	7	3	520
4	(Australia) Matthew Brabham R	9	3	4	12	**1***	4	2*	5	4	5	12	2*	6	5	424
5	(Brazil) Luiz Razia R	5	5	2	4	2	**1***	**4**	8	12	3	11	8	3	4	403
6	(Mexico) Juan Pablo García	7	8	7	6	6	6	6	4	8	10	6	7	4	9	372
7	(Colombia) Juan Piedrahita R	6	7	10	7	8	11	8	7	7	9	5	6	5	7	337
8	(United States) Scott Anderson R	12	9	12	10	7	5	9	6	9	8	9	4	8	10	309
9	(Canada) Zack Meyer R	8	10	9	8	4	10	10		10	7	10		9	8	274
10	(France) Alexandre Baron R	10	6	5	2	5	3	7		**1***						261
11	(United Kingdom) Lloyd Read R	11	11	11	9	10	9									101
12	(United States) Ryan Phinny R									11	12	7		10	6	91
13	(Italy) Vittorio Ghirelli R	4	12	8	11											90
14	(Zimbabwe) Axcil Jefferies R										6	4				60
15	(United States) Jimmy Simpson R										11	8				42
16	(Canada) Matthew Di Leo									6						28
17	(United States) Chase Austin							11								1
Pos	Driver	STP (United States)	LBH (United States)	ALA (United States)		IND (United States)		INDY (United States)	POC (United States)	TOR (Canada)	MOH (United States)		MIL (United States)	SNM (United States)		Pts

Color	Result
Gold	Winner
Silver	2nd place
Bronze	3rd place
Green	4th & 5th place
Light Blue	6th–10th place
Dark Blue	Finished (Outside Top 10)
Purple	Did not finish
Red	Did not qualify (DNQ)
Brown	Withdrawn (Wth)
Black	Disqualified (DSQ)
White	Did not start (DNS)
Blank	Did not participate (DNP)
Blank	Not competing

**In-line notation**
**Bold**	Pole position (1 point)
Italics	Ran fastest race lap (1 point)
*	Led most race laps (1 point)
^{1}	Qualifying cancelled no bonus point awarded
Rookie

- Ties in points broken by number of wins, or best finishes.

=== Teams' championship ===
Pos	Team	Points
1	(United States) Schmidt Peterson Motorsports	403
2	(United States) Andretti Autosport	370
3	(United States) Belardi Auto Racing	357
4	(United States) Fan Force United	122
5	(United States) Team Moore Racing	111
6	(United States) Bryan Herta Autosport/Jeffrey Mark Motorsport	56
7	(Canada) MDL Racing	11
