= Petri Suvanto =

Finnish racing driver

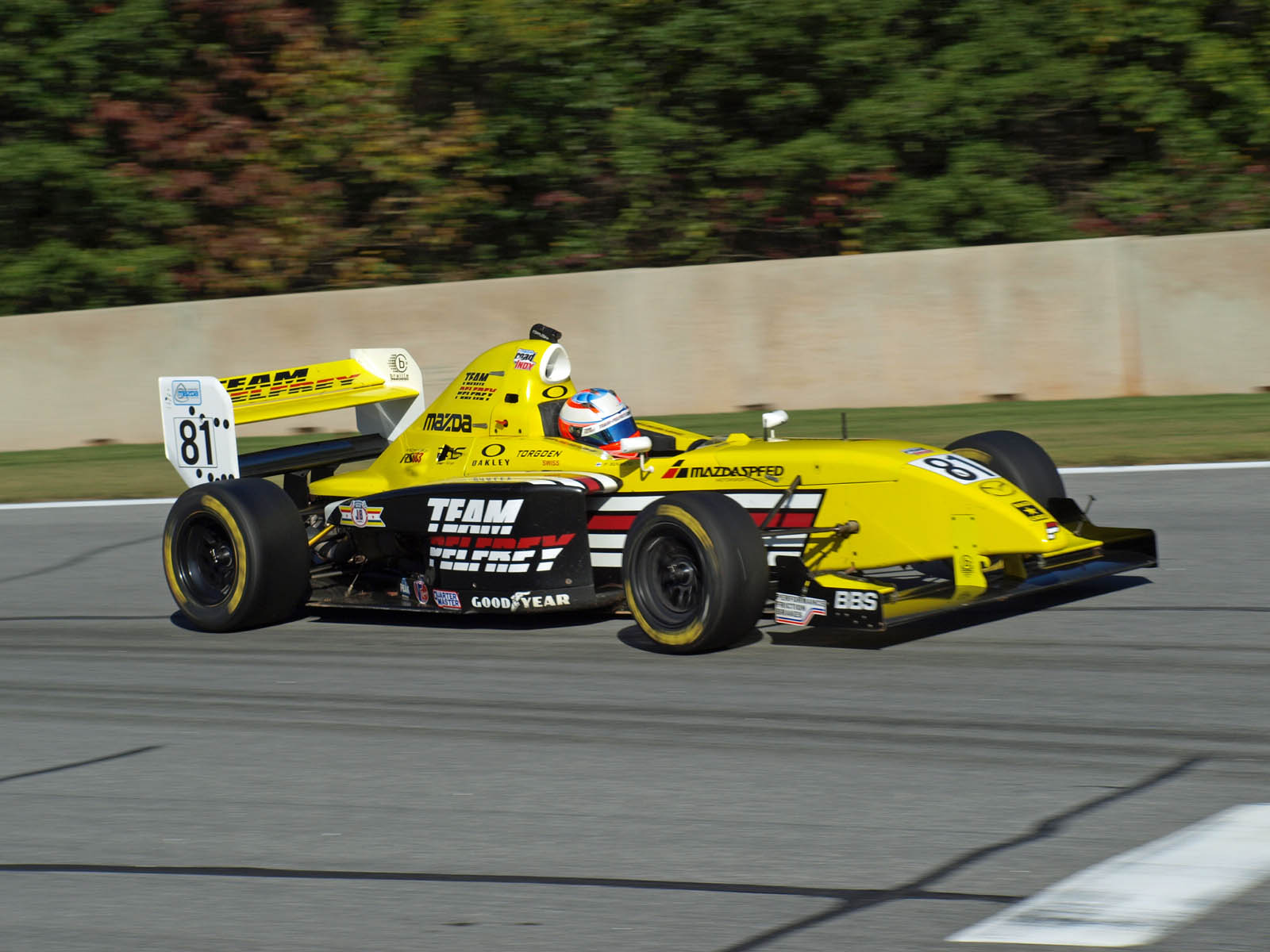
- Petri Suvanto during the 2012 Road Atlanta Star Mazda round
- Nationality: (Finland) Finnish
- Born: 13 November 1992 (age 34) Nurmo, Finland

Star Mazda Championship career
- Years active: 2012–13
- Starts: 21
- Wins: 0
- Poles: 0
- Fastest laps: 0
- Best finish: 5th in 2012

Previous series
- 2011 2010: U.S. F2000 National Championship; Formula BMW Europe

Championship titles
- 2011: U.S. F2000 National Championship
- Statistics up to date as of 11 December 2016.

Petri Suvanto (born 13 November 1992) is a Finnish former racing driver from Seinäjoki.

After winning and placing highly in several Finnish karting championships and finishing fourth in 2008 CIK-FIA KF2 European Championships, Suvanto moved to car racing in 2010 in Formula BMW Europe for Josef Kaufmann Racing. He finished eleventh in points with a best finish of sixth at Zandvoort and Silverstone. Seeking a change of venue for 2011, Suvanto entered the American Road to Indy ladder in the U.S. F2000 National Championship. Suvanto captured four poles, five wins, and finished on the podium in all but one of the season's twelve races. He secured the championship in the first race of the final race weekend of the season over American Spencer Pigot by 47 points. By winning the championship, he secured full funding to compete in the Star Mazda Championship in 2012. He signed to race with Team Pelfrey for the 2012 Star Mazda Championship season. Suvanto finished fifth in points with only a single podium finish but also only a single DNF on the season. He returned to the series, now called the Pro Mazda Championship, and Team Pelfrey for 2013, however, his season ended after four races due to lack of funding.

== Racing record ==
=== Career summary ===
Season	Series	Team	Races	Wins	Poles	F/Laps	Podiums	Points	Position
2010	Formula BMW Europe	Josef Kaufmann Racing	16	0	0	0	0	100	11th
2011	U.S. F2000 National Championship	Cape Motorsports with Wayne Taylor Racing	12	5	5	6	11	328	1st
2012	Star Mazda Championship	Team Pelfrey	17	0	0	0	1	271	5th
2013	Pro Mazda Championship	Team Pelfrey	4	0	0	0	0	57	10th

=== U.S. F2000 National Championship results ===
Year	Team	1	2	3	4	5	6	7	8	9	10	11	12	Rank	Points
2011	Cape Motorsports Wayne Taylor Racing	SEB; 2	SEB; 3	STP; 2	STP; 1	ORP; 1	MIL; 5	MOH; 1	MOH; 1	ROA; 2	ROA; 1	BAL; 2	BAL; 2	1st	328

=== Star Mazda Championship results ===
Year	Team	1	2	3	4	5	6	7	8	9	10	11	12	13	14	15	16	17	Rank	Points
2012	Team Pelfrey	STP; 5	STP; 3	BAR; 6	BAR; 6	IND; 5	IOW; 4	TOR; 6	TOR; 8	EDM; 19	EDM; 4	TRO; 14	TRO; 4	BAL; 4	BAL; 4	LAG; 5	LAG; 5	ATL; 6	5th	271
2013	Team Pelfrey	COA; 5	COA; 5	STP; 11	STP; 8	IND	IOW	TOR	TOR	MOS	MOS	MOH	MOH	TRO	TRO	HOU	HOU		10th	57
