= Ryan Phinny =

American racing driver

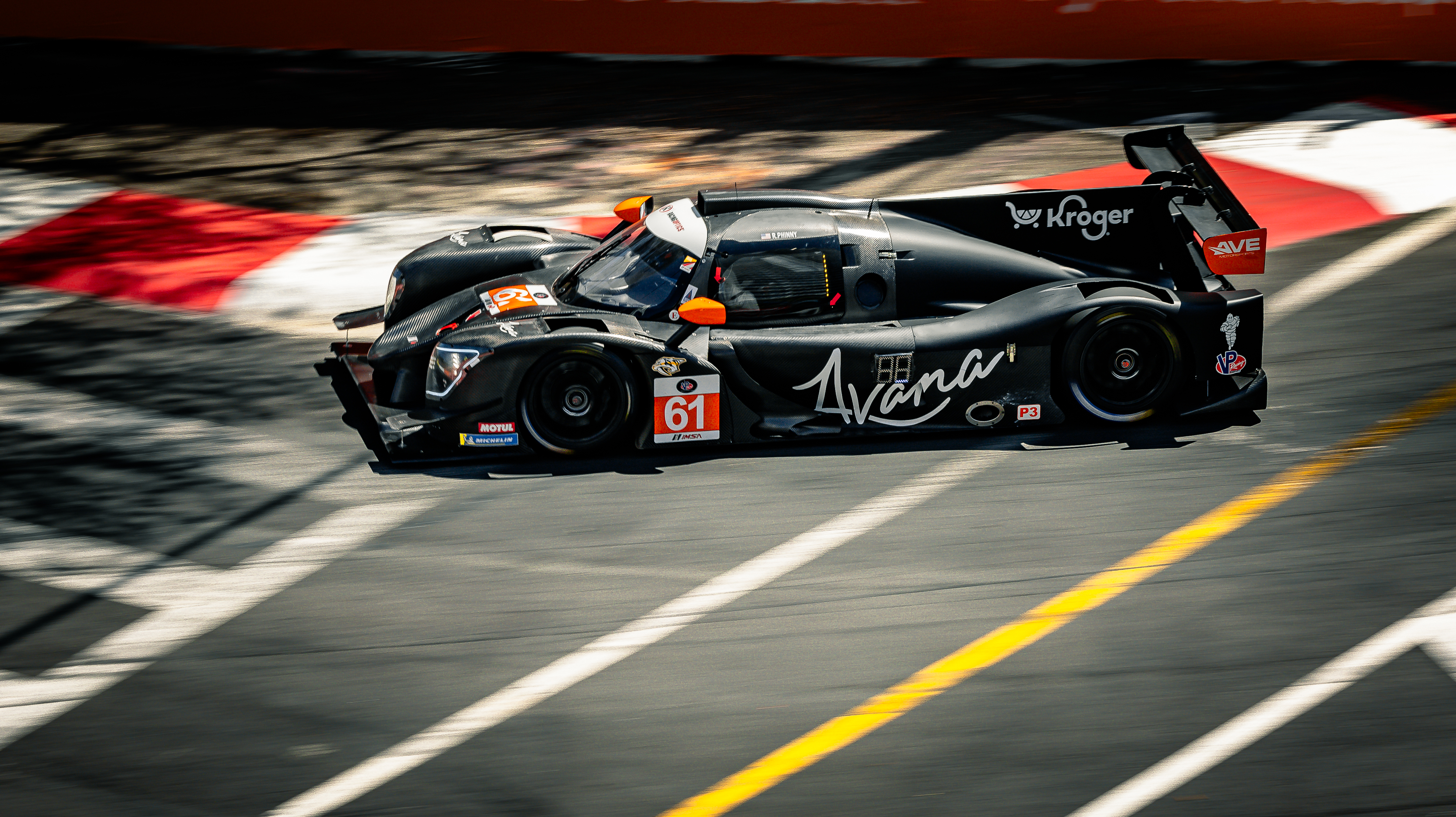
- Phinny at the Grand Prix of St. Petersburg in 2024
- Nationality: (United States) American
- Born: October 31, 1989 (age 37); Los Angeles, California, U.S.

Indy Lights career
- 10 races run over 3 years
- Best finish: 12th (2014)
- First race: 2011 Long Beach 100 (Long Beach)
- Last race: 2022 Indy Lights Detroit Grand Prix (Detroit)
Wins	Podiums	Poles
0	0	0

Ryan Phinny (born October 31, 1989) is an American racing driver from Los Angeles, California who races the No. 51 Ligier LMP3 for Rick Ware Racing.

== Career ==
After karting, Phinny made his Formula BMW USA debut in 2005 for Gelles Racing for two races and competed full-time in 2006 for Hearn Motorsports. He finished ninth in points with one podium finish. He also drove in the Formula BMW World Final for Gelles and finished 23rd. He was away from racing in 2007. In 2008, he made six starts in the Rolex Sports Car Series' GT class for Matt Connolly Motorsports in their Pontiac GTO.R and finished 22nd in points. In 2009, he made two starts for the same team. He also drove in the American Le Mans Series' 2009 Sports Car Challenge of St. Petersburg with Panoz Team PTG. In 2010 he only participated in karting races. In 2011, he made a surprise appearance in Indy Lights driving for Brooks Associates Racing at the Long Beach Grand Prix.

His father, Pat Phinny, was also a racing driver who competed in Formula Super Vee and made one Indy Lights start in 1987.

== Racing Record ==
=== Career summary ===
Season	Series	Team	Races	Wins	Poles	F/Laps	Podiums	Points	Position
2005	Formula BMW USA	Gelles Racing	2	0	0	0	0	0	24th
2006	Formula BMW USA	Hearn Motorsports	14	0	0	1	1	43	10th
2006	Formula BMW World Final	Gelles Racing	1	0	0	0	0	N/A	23rd
2008	Rolex Sports Car Series - GT	Matt Connolly Motorsports	6	0	0	0	2	155	26th
2009	Rolex Sports Car Series - GT	Battery Tender/MCM Racing	2	0	0	0	0	17	80th
2011	Indy Lights	Brooks Associates Racing	1	0	0	0	0	14	30th
2014	Indy Lights	Bryan Herta Autosport Jeffrey Mark Motorsport	3	0	0	0	0	91	12th
2014	Indy Lights	Belardi Auto Racing	2	0	0	0	0	91	12th
2022	Indy Lights	Abel Motorsports	4	0	0	0	0	77	14th
2024	IMSA VP Racing SportsCar Challenge - LMP3	Ave Motorsports	10	0	0	0	0	2220	6th

=== American open-wheel results ===
Indy Lights

(key) (Races in bold indicate pole position) (Races in italics indicate fastest lap) (Races with * indicate most race laps led)

Year	Team	1	2	3	4	5	6	7	8	9	10	11	12	13	14	Rank	Points
2011	Brooks Associates Racing	STP	ALA	LBH; 16	INDY	MIL	IOW	TOR	EDM; 1	EDM; 2	TRO	NHM	BAL	KTY	LVS	**30th**	**14**
2014	Bryan Herta Autosport	STP	LBH	ALA; 1	ALA; 2	IMS; 1	IMS; 2	INDY	POC	TOR; 11	MOH; 1; 12	MOH; 2; 7	MIL			**12th**	**91**
2014	Belardi Auto Racing													SNM; 1; 10	SNM; 2; 6	**12th**	**91**
2022	Abel Motorsports	STP	ALA	IMS; 14	IMS; 12	DET; 8	DET; 11	RDA	MOH	IOW	NSH	GTW	POR	LAG	LAG	14th	77
