= 2013 Pro Mazda Championship =

Seasons
- ← 2012 2014 →

The 2013 Pro Mazda Championship was the 15th season in series history and first under new promoter Andersen Promotions.

Andretti Autosport driver Matthew Brabham won the championship with two races remaining capturing a series-record 11th win in his rookie season. Brabham's championship secured a scholarship to compete in Indy Lights in 2014. Brabham won 13 of the season's 16 races, shattering the series record. Juncos Racing's Diego Ferreira won the season opener and finished second in points with eleven podium finishes. Brabham's Andretti Autosport teammate Shelby Blackstock won a single race and two poles and finished third in points. Team Pelfrey's Spencer Pigot also won a single race and finished fourth in points.

Andretti Autosport also captured the team championship with two races remaining, their first in Pro Mazda.

There were no full-time Expert class participants (a class for drivers age 35 and older). American Jay Horak won the championship with eight race starts by a narrow margin over Bobby Eberle, who also completed a partial schedule.

While only nine drivers competed in all sixteen rounds of the championship, 27 different drivers made appearances in a Pro Mazda car over the course of the season.

== Drivers and teams ==
All teams were American-registered.

Team	No.	Drivers	Notes
Andretti Autosport	28	(United States) Shelby Blackstock	
Andretti Autosport	83	(Australia) Matthew Brabham	
Garibotti Racing	75	(United States) Jeff Garibotti	Expert class; Austin only
JDC MotorSports	9	(Colombia) Juan Piedrahita	
JDC MotorSports	16	(United Kingdom) Lloyd Read	
JDC MotorSports	19	(United States) Nick Andries	Austin and St. Pete only
JDC MotorSports	66	(Canada) Zack Meyer	
Juncos Racing	2	(Mexico) Jose Gutierrez	Austin and Mid-Ohio only
Juncos Racing	3	(Argentina) Julia Ballario	Mid-Ohio and Trois-Rivieres only
Juncos Racing	44	(United States) Scott Anderson	
Juncos Racing	57	(Venezuela) Diego Ferreira	
M1 Racing	11	(Colombia) Juan Camilo Acosta	Austin and St. Pete only
M1 Racing	23	(United States) Walt Bowlin	Expert class; Toronto and Mid-Ohio only
M1 Racing	29	(United States) Jason Rabe	Houston only
M1 Racing	37	(United States) Jay Horak	Expert class; Austin, Mid-Ohio, Trois-Rivieres, and Houston
M1 Racing	91	(United States) Kyle Connery	Mid-Ohio only
PRL Motorsports	48	(United States) Patrick Linn	Austin only
Team Pelfrey	80	(Canada) Dalton Kellett	CTMP only
Team Pelfrey	81	(United States) Spencer Pigot	
Team Pelfrey	82	(Finland) Petri Suvanto	Austin and St. Pete only
Team Pelfrey	82	(Norway) Anders Krohn	Indianapolis and Milwaukee only
Team Pelfrey	82	(Brazil) Nicolas Costa	Toronto, CTMP, Mid-Ohio, and Houston
Team Pelfrey	83	(Canada) Stefan Rzadzinski	Trois-Rivieres only
World Speed Motorsports	6	(Philippines) Michele Bumgarner	Houston only
World Speed Motorsports	13	(United States) Bobby Eberle	Expert class; Mid-Ohio, Trois-Rivieres, and Houston
World Speed Motorsports	18	(United States) Kyle Kaiser	
World Speed Motorsports	24	(United States) Michael Whelden	Houston only

== Race calendar and results ==
Rnd	Circuit	Location	Date	Pole position	Fastest lap	Winning driver	Winning team	Supporting
1	Circuit of the Americas	Austin, Texas	March 1	(Venezuela) Diego Ferreira	(Venezuela) Diego Ferreira	(Venezuela) Diego Ferreira	Juncos Racing	Rolex Sports Car Series
2	Circuit of the Americas	Austin, Texas	March 2		(Australia) Matthew Brabham	(Australia) Matthew Brabham	Andretti Autosport	Rolex Sports Car Series
3	Streets of St. Petersburg	St. Petersburg, Florida	March 23	(United States) Shelby Blackstock	(Australia) Matthew Brabham	(Australia) Matthew Brabham	Andretti Autosport	IndyCar Series
4	Streets of St. Petersburg	St. Petersburg, Florida	March 24		(Australia) Matthew Brabham	(Australia) Matthew Brabham	Andretti Autosport	IndyCar Series
5	Lucas Oil Raceway at Indianapolis	Clermont, Indiana	May 25	(Australia) Matthew Brabham	(Australia) Matthew Brabham	(Australia) Matthew Brabham	Andretti Autosport	USAC Midgets
6	Milwaukee Mile	West Allis, Wisconsin	June 15	(Australia) Matthew Brabham	(Australia) Matthew Brabham	(Australia) Matthew Brabham	Andretti Autosport	IndyCar Series
7	Streets of Toronto	Toronto, Ontario	July 13	(Australia) Matthew Brabham	(Australia) Matthew Brabham	(Australia) Matthew Brabham	Andretti Autosport	IndyCar Series
8	Streets of Toronto	Toronto, Ontario	July 14		(Australia) Matthew Brabham	(Australia) Matthew Brabham	Andretti Autosport	IndyCar Series
9	Canadian Tire Motorsport Park	Bowmanville, Ontario	July 20	(United States) Shelby Blackstock	(United States) Spencer Pigot	(United States) Spencer Pigot	Team Pelfrey	American Le Mans Series
10	Canadian Tire Motorsport Park	Bowmanville, Ontario	July 21		(Australia) Matthew Brabham	(United States) Shelby Blackstock	Andretti Autosport	American Le Mans Series
11	Mid-Ohio Sports Car Course	Lexington, Ohio	August 3	(Australia) Matthew Brabham	(Australia) Matthew Brabham	(Australia) Matthew Brabham	Andretti Autosport	IndyCar Series
12	Mid-Ohio Sports Car Course	Lexington, Ohio	August 4		(Venezuela) Diego Ferreira	(Australia) Matthew Brabham	Andretti Autosport	IndyCar Series
13	Circuit Trois-Rivières	Trois-Rivières, Quebec	August 10	(Australia) Matthew Brabham	(Australia) Matthew Brabham	(Australia) Matthew Brabham	Andretti Autosport	NASCAR Canadian Tire Series
14	Circuit Trois-Rivières	Trois-Rivières, Quebec	August 11	(Australia) Matthew Brabham	(Australia) Matthew Brabham	(Australia) Matthew Brabham	Andretti Autosport	NASCAR Canadian Tire Series
15	Reliant Park	Houston, Texas	October 5	(Australia) Matthew Brabham	(Australia) Matthew Brabham	(Australia) Matthew Brabham	Andretti Autosport	IndyCar Series
16	Reliant Park	Houston, Texas	October 6		(Australia) Matthew Brabham	(Australia) Matthew Brabham	Andretti Autosport	IndyCar Series

== Championship standings ==
=== Drivers' ===
Pos	Driver	AUS (United States)		STP (United States)		IND (United States)	MIL (United States)	TOR (Canada)		MOS (Canada)		MOH (United States)		TRO (Canada)		HOU (United States)		Points
Overall
1	(Australia) Matthew Brabham	3	1*	1*	1*	**1***	**1***	**1***	**1***	3	9	**1***	**1***	**1***	1*	**1***	1*	466
2	(Venezuela) Diego Ferreira	**1***	2	3	2	6	6	2	2	6	3	3	2	2	2	5	4	357
3	(United States) Shelby Blackstock	9	3	**2**	3	3	7	6	7	**2**	1	2	4	6	11	4	6	297
4	(United States) Spencer Pigot	2	16	4	4	2	3	9	11	1*	4*	4	5	5	5	2	5	297
5	(United States) Scott Anderson	6	4	8	7	5	5	10	9	4	2	16	6	4	4	6	7	245
6	(Canada) Zack Meyer	7	7	7	6	8	8	11	4	7	5	13	7	11	6	10	13	209
7	(United States) Kyle Kaiser	8	6	5	10	7	10	5	5	8	6	6	8	10	13	8	8	209
8	(United Kingdom) Lloyd Read	11	9	9	9	9	9	4	10	9	7	7	9	7	10	7	14	198
9	(Colombia) Juan Piedrahita	16	15	6	12	10	2	7	3	11	DNS	5	16	3	3	13	3	182
10	(Finland) Petri Suvanto	5	5	11	8													57
11	(United States) Jay Horak	14^{1}	13^{1}									14	14	13	9	12	10	54
12	(United States) Bobby Eberle											11	13	12	8	DNS	12	49
13	(Colombia) Juan Acosta	4	14	10	11													45
14	(United States) Nick Andries	15	8	12	5													40
Expert class
1	(United States) Jay Horak	14^{1}	13^{1}									14	14	13	9	12	10	110
2	(United States) Bobby Eberle											11	13	12	8	DNS	12	102
Unregistered drivers
	(Brazil) Nicolas Costa							3	6	5	10	15	3			3	2	
	(Norway) Anders Krohn					4	4											
	(Argentina) Julia Ballario											9	11	9	7			
	(United States) Walt Bowlin							8	8			12	12					
	(Canada) Dalton Kellett									10	8							
	(Canada) Stefan Rzadzinski													8	12			
	(United States) Kyle Connery											8	15					
	(Philippines) Michele Bumgarner															14	9	
	(United States) Michael Whelden															9	15	
	(Mexico) Jose Gutierrez	10	10									10	10					
	(United States) Jason Rabe															11	11	
	(United States) Patrick Linn	13	11															
	(United States) Jeff Garibotti	12	12															
Pos	Driver	AUS (United States)		STP (United States)		IND (United States)	MIL (United States)	TOR (Canada)		MOS (Canada)		MOH (United States)		TRO (Canada)		HOU (United States)		Points

Color	Result
Gold	Winner
Silver	2nd place
Bronze	3rd place
Green	4th & 5th place
Light Blue	6th–10th place
Dark Blue	Finished (Outside Top 10)
Purple	Did not finish
Red	Did not qualify (DNQ)
Brown	Withdrawn (Wth)
Black	Disqualified (DSQ)
White	Did not start (DNS)
Blank	Did not participate (DNP)
Blank	Not competing

**In-line notation**
**Bold**	Pole position (1 point)
Italics	Ran fastest race lap (1 point)
*	Led most race laps (1 point)

Position	1	2	3	4	5	6	7	8	9	10	11	12	13	14	15	16	17	18	19	20
Overall points	30	25	22	19	17	15	14	13	12	11	10	9	8	7	6	5	4	3	2	1

- Drivers must complete 50% race distance to score main points, otherwise 1 point is awarded.
- ^{1}: Jay Horak was not registered for the championship at Austin.

=== Teams' ===
Pos	Team	Points
1	Andretti Autosport	513
2	Juncos Racing	377
3	Team Pelfrey	332
4	JDC MotorSports	263
5	M1 Racing	62
