= Juan Piedrahita =

Colombian racing driver

- Nationality: (Colombia) Colombian
- Born: Juan Diego Piedrahita Cortes; July 27, 1992 (age 34) Bogotá, Colombia

Indy Lights career
- Debut season: 2014
- Current team: Team Pelfrey
- Categorisation: FIA Silver
- Car number: 2
- Starts: 58
- Podiums: 1
- Best finish: 7th in 2014

Previous series
- 2010, 2012-2013 2011 2009: Pro Mazda Championship; U.S. F2000 National Championship; LATAM Challenge Series

Juan Diego Piedrahita Cortes (born July 27, 1992) is a Colombian racing driver. Piedrahita began his driving career aged seven, karting in Mexico. Piedrahita transitioned to auto racing in 2009 competing in the LATAM Challenge Series where he gained two podiums, finished seventh in overall points and 2nd in the rookie standings.

In 2010, Piedrahita competed in Star Mazda Championship for Team Apex where he competed in eight of the thirteen races and collected one top-five and four top-ten finishes. In 2011, he competed in the U.S. F2000 National Championship for JDC MotorSports as part of the Road to Indy. Piedrahita finished seventh in the championship, capturing two podium finishes at the series' two oval races at Lucas Oil Raceway at Indianapolis and the Milwaukee Mile.

For the 2012 season, Piedrahita returned to Star Mazda full-time staying with the JDC MotorSports team. He finished seventh in points and captured a career-best second-place finish in race two in Toronto. He returned for another season in the series, now called Pro Mazda, in 2013, again with JDC. Piedrahita fell to ninth in points, suffering six DNF's, but did capture a second-place finish at the Milwaukee Mile and four third-place finishes.

For the 2014, Piedrahita moved up the Road to Indy to Indy Lights, signing with defending series champion team Schmidt Peterson Motorsports.

== Racing record ==
=== American open–wheel racing ===
(key) (Races in bold indicate pole position; races in italics indicate fastest lap)

==== Star Mazda Championship / Pro Mazda Championship ====
| Year | Team | 1 | 2 | 3 | 4 | 5 | 6 | 7 | 8 | 9 | 10 | 11 | 12 | 13 | 14 | 15 | 16 | 17 | Rank | Points |
|---|---|---|---|---|---|---|---|---|---|---|---|---|---|---|---|---|---|---|---|---|
| 2010 | Team Apex | SEB; 19 | STP; 11 | LAG; 5 | ORP | IOW | NJ1; 10 | NJ2; 13 | ACC | ACC | TRO | ROA; 6 | MOS; 15 | ATL; 13 | | | | | **16th** | **199** |
| 2012 | JDC MotorSports | STP; 4 | STP; 2 | BAR; 8 | BAR; 4 | IND; 8 | IOW; 14 | TOR; 4 | TOR; 2 | EDM; 8 | EDM; 16 | TRO; 9 | TRO; 11 | BAL; 19 | BAL; 9 | LAG; 8 | LAG; 9 | ATL; 9 | **7th** | **234** |
| 2013 | JDC MotorSports | AUS; 16 | AUS; 15 | STP; 6 | STP; 12 | IND; 10 | IOW; 2 | TOR; 7 | TOR; 3 | MOS; 11 | MOS; DNS | MOH; 5 | MOH; 16 | TRO; 3 | TRO; 3 | HOU; 13 | HOU; 3 | | **9th** | **182** |

==== U.S. F2000 National Championship ====
| Year | Team | 1 | 2 | 3 | 4 | 5 | 6 | 7 | 8 | 9 | 10 | 11 | 12 | Rank | Points |
|---|---|---|---|---|---|---|---|---|---|---|---|---|---|---|---|
| 2011 | JDC MotorSports | SEB; 6 | SEB; 5 | STP; 12 | STP; 9 | ORP; 3 | MIL; 3 | MOH; 7 | MOH; 8 | ROA; 6 | ROA; 15 | BAL; 16 | BAL; 14 | **7th** | **145** |

==== Indy Lights ====
| Year | Team | 1 | 2 | 3 | 4 | 5 | 6 | 7 | 8 | 9 | 10 | 11 | 12 | 13 | 14 | 15 | 16 | 17 | 18 | Rank | Points | Ref |
|---|---|---|---|---|---|---|---|---|---|---|---|---|---|---|---|---|---|---|---|---|---|---|
| 2014 | Schmidt Peterson Motorsports | STP; 6 | LBH; 7 | ALA; 10 | ALA; 7 | IND; 8 | IND; 11 | INDY; 8 | POC; 7 | TOR; 7 | MOH; 9 | MOH; 5 | MIL; 6 | SNM; 5 | SNM; 7 | | | | | **7th** | **337** | |
| 2015 | Belardi Auto Racing | STP; 6 | STP; 9 | LBH; 8 | ALA; 7 | ALA; 8 | IMS; 11 | IMS; 7 | INDY; 7 | TOR; 10 | TOR; 4 | MIL; 3 | IOW; 7 | MOH; 6 | MOH; 12 | LAG; 7 | LAG; 7 | | | 8th | 223 | |
| 2016 | Team Pelfrey | STP; 9 | STP; 8 | PHX; 12 | ALA; 7 | ALA; 16 | IMS; 15 | IMS; 11 | INDY; 8 | RDA; 12 | RDA; 7 | IOW; 7 | TOR; 14 | TOR; 12 | MOH | MOH | WGL | LAG | LAG | 13th | 135 | |
| 2017 | Team Pelfrey | STP; 14 | STP; 10 | ALA; 11 | ALA; 11 | IMS; DNS | IMS; 5 | INDY; 8 | RDA; 5 | RDA; 10 | IOW; 10 | TOR; 6 | TOR; 4 | MOH; 10 | MOH; 11 | **GMP**; 2 | WGL; 9 | | | 9th | 208 | |

=== Complete WeatherTech SportsCar Championship results ===
(key) (Races in bold indicate pole position) (Races in italics indicate fastest lap)

| Year | Entrant | Class | Make | Engine | 1 | 2 | 3 | 4 | 5 | 6 | 7 | 8 | 9 | 10 | Pos. | Pts | Ref |
|---|---|---|---|---|---|---|---|---|---|---|---|---|---|---|---|---|---|
| 2019 | JDC-Miller MotorSports | DPi | Cadillac DPi-V.R | Cadillac 5.5L V8 | DAY; 10 | SEB; 7 | LBH | MOH | DET | WGL; 10 | MOS | ELK | LGA | PET; 9 | 19th | 88 | |
| 2020 | JDC-Miller MotorSports | DPi | Cadillac DPi-V.R | Cadillac 5.5 L V8 | DAY; 5 | DAY | SEB | ELK | ATL | MOH | ATL | LGA | SEB | | 25th | 26 | |
