= 2016 12 Hours of Sebring =

Sports car endurance race

Sebring International Raceway

The 64th Mobil 1 12 Hours of Sebring Fueled by Fresh from Florida was an endurance sports car racing event held at Sebring International Raceway near Sebring, Florida, from 16 to 19 March 2016. The event was the second round of the 2016 IMSA SportsCar Championship, as well as the second round of the North American Endurance Cup. It was the final time that the original Daytona Prototypes participated in the race, as, for 2017, they were replaced with the new DPi cars.

The race was won by Tequila Patrón ESM's Honda HPD-Ligier JS P2 driven by Scott Sharp, Johannes van Overbeek, Ed Brown, and Pipo Derani after completing a pass for the lead in the final moments of the race. It was the first overall 12 Hours of Sebring win for both ESM and Honda. The Prototype Challenge class was won by the No. 54 CORE Autosport entry driven by Colin Braun, Mark Wilkins, and Jon Bennett. GT Le Mans was won by the No. 4 Chevrolet Corvette C7.R from Corvette Racing, driven by Oliver Gavin, Tommy Milner, and Marcel Fässler. The GT Daytona class was won by the No. 63 Ferrari 488 GT3 from Scuderia Corsa, driven by Christina Nielsen, Alessandro Balzan, and Jeff Segal. The race saw a stoppage of roughly two hours and 15 minutes due to heavy rain and lightning just before the halfway-point of the event.

== Background ==
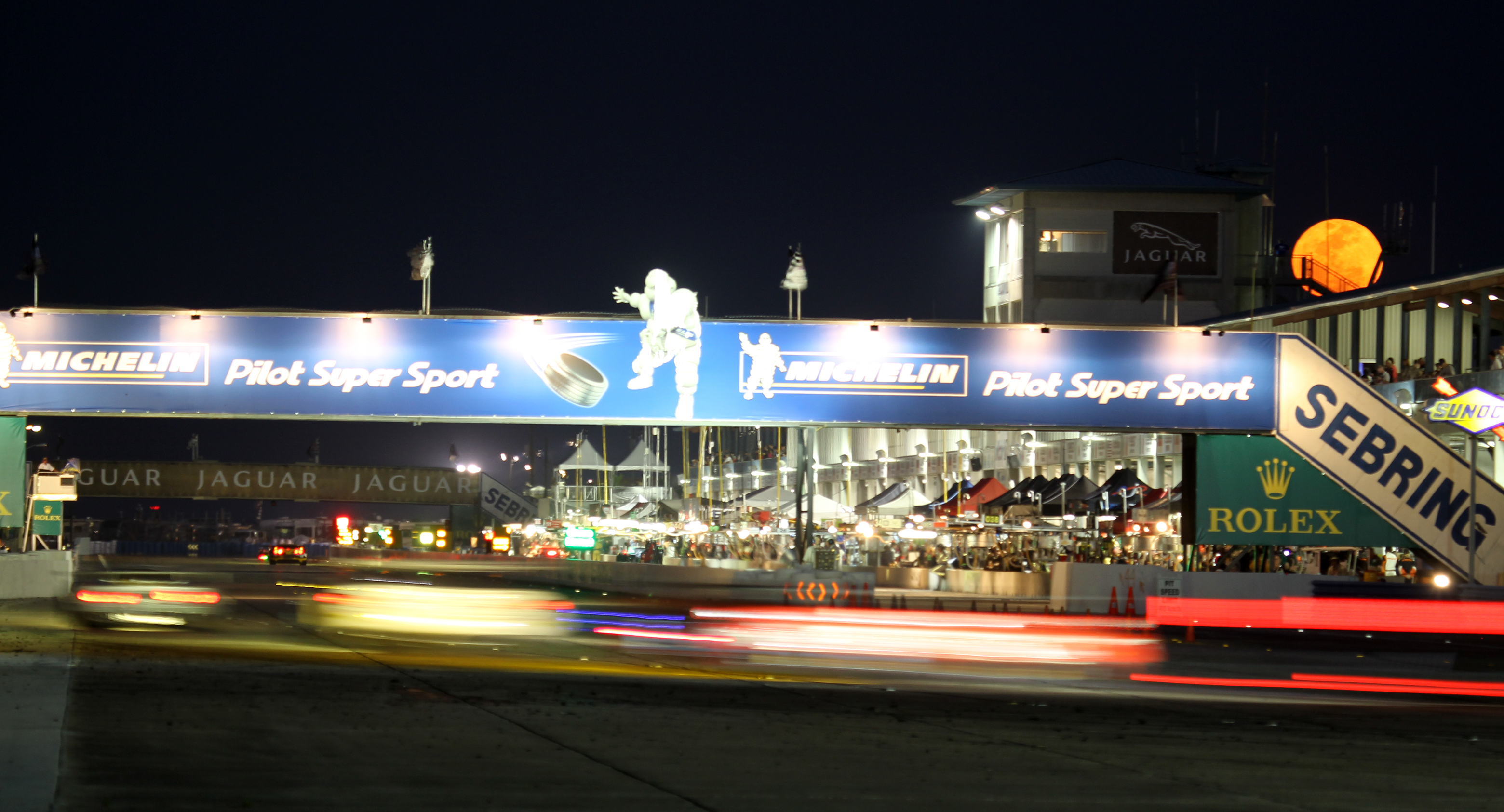
Sebring International Raceway, where the race was held.

International Motor Sports Association (IMSA) president Scott Atherton confirmed the race was part of the schedule for the 2016 IMSA SportsCar Championship (IMSA SCC) in August 2015. It was the third consecutive year the event was held as part of the WeatherTech SportsCar Championship, and the 64th 12 Hours of Sebring. The 12 Hours of Sebring was the second of twelve scheduled automobile endurance races of 2016 by IMSA, and the second in the four round North American Endurance Cup (NAEC). It was held at the 17-turn, 3.741-mile (6.021 km) Sebring International Raceway in Sebring, Florida on March 19, 2016.

Before the race, Ed Brown, Pipo Derani, Johannes van Overbeek, and Scott Sharp were leading the Prototype Drivers' Championship with 36 points. With 36 points, Misha Goikhberg, Kenton Koch, Chris Miller, and Stephen Simpson led the PC Drivers' Championship. GTLM was led by Marcel Fässler, Oliver Gavin, and Tommy Milner with a three-point advantage over Antonio García, Jan Magnussen, and Mike Rockenfeller. In GTD, the Drivers' Championship was led by Andy Lally, John Potter, René Rast, and Marco Seefried with 36 points. Honda, Chevrolet, and Audi were leading their respective Manufacturers' Championships, while Tequila Patrón ESM, JDC-Miller MotorSports, Corvette Racing, Magnus Racing each led their own Teams' Championships.

== Practice ==
There were four practice sessions preceding the start of the race on Saturday, three on Thursday and one on Friday. The first two one-hour sessions were on Thursday morning and afternoon. The third held later that evening ran for 90 minutes; the fourth on Friday morning lasted an hour.

=== Practice 1 ===
The first practice session took place at 10:00 am ET on Thursday and ended with Dane Cameron topping the charts for Action Express Racing, with a lap time of 1:52.447.

Pos.	Class	No.	Team	Driver	Time	Gap
1	P	31	Action Express Racing	Dane Cameron	1:52.447	_
2	P	5	Action Express Racing	Scott Pruett	1:53.226	+0.779
3	P	2	Tequila Patrón ESM	Johannes van Overbeek	1:53.312	+0.865

=== Practice 2 ===
The second practice session took place at 2:25 pm ET on Thursday and ended with Christian Fittipaldi topping the charts for Action Express Racing, with a lap time of 1:53.850.

Pos.	Class	No.	Team	Driver	Time	Gap
1	P	5	Action Express Racing	Christian Fittipaldi	1:53.850	_
2	P	31	Action Express Racing	Scott Pruett	1:54.283	+0.433
3	P	24	Alegra Motorsports	Daniel Morad	1:54.334	+0.484

=== Night Practice ===
The night practice session took place at 7:30 pm ET on Thursday and ended with Filipe Albuquerque topping the charts for Action Express Racing, with a lap time of 1:52.832.

Pos.	Class	No.	Team	Driver	Time	Gap
1	P	5	Action Express Racing	Filipe Albuquerque	1:52.832	_
2	P	55	Mazda Motorsports	Jonathan Bomarito	1:53.882	+1.050
3	P	10	Wayne Taylor Racing	Jordan Taylor	1:54.088	+1.256

=== Final Practice ===
The fourth and final practice session took place at 10:15 am ET on Friday and ended with Dane Cameron topping the charts for Action Express Racing, with a lap time of 1:52.135.

Pos.	Class	No.	Team	Driver	Time	Gap
1	P	31	Action Express Racing	Dane Cameron	1:52.135	_
2	P	5	Action Express Racing	Filipe Albuquerque	1:52.228	+0.093
3	P	60	Michael Shank Racing with Curb/Agajanian	Olivier Pla	1:53.067	+0.932

== Qualifying ==
In Friday afternoon's 90-minute four-group qualifying, each category had separate 15-minute sessions. Regulations stipulated that teams nominate one qualifying driver, with the fastest laps determining each class' starting order. IMSA arranged the grid to put Prototypes ahead of the PC, GTLM and GTD cars.

=== Qualifying results ===
Pole positions in each class are indicated in bold and by ‡. All Prototype and Prototype Challenge cars were grouped together on the starting grid, regardless of qualifying position.

Pos.	Class	No.	Team	Driver	Time	Gap	Grid
1	**P**	**60**	**(United States) Michael Shank Racing with Curb/Agajanian**	**(France) Olivier Pla**	**1:51.217**	**_**	1 ‡
2	P	2	(United States) Tequila Patrón ESM	(Brazil) Pipo Derani	1:51.391	+0.174	2
3	P	31	(United States) Action Express Racing	(United States) Dane Cameron	1:51.943	+0.726	3
4	P	5	(United States) Action Express Racing	(Brazil) Christian Fittipaldi	1:52.205	+0.988	4
5	P	55	(United States) Mazda Motorsports	(United States) Tristan Nunez	1:52.951	+1.734	5
6	P	90	(United States) VisitFlorida Racing	(Belgium) Marc Goossens	1:53.185	+1.968	6
7	P	70	(United States) Mazda Motorsports	(United States) Tom Long	1:53.513	+2.296	7
8	P	10	(United States) Wayne Taylor Racing	(Brazil) Rubens Barrichello	1:53.576	+2.359	8
9	P	81	(United States) DragonSpeed	(France) Nicolas Minassian	1:54.171	+2.954	9
10	P	24	(United States) Alegra Motorsports	(Canada) Daniel Morad	1:54.193	+2.976	10
11	P	0	(United States) Panoz DeltaWing Racing	(United Kingdom) Andy Meyrick	1:54.274	+3.057	11
12	**PC**	**54**	**(United States) CORE Autosport**	**(United States) Colin Braun**	**1:54.910**	**+3.693**	12‡
13	PC	52	(United States) PR1/Mathiasen Motorsports	(United Kingdom) Tom Kimber-Smith	1:55.843	+4.626	13
14	PC	20	(United States) BAR1 Motorsports	(United Kingdom) Johnny Mowlem	1:56.661	+5.444	14
15	PC	38	(United States) Performance Tech Motorsports	(United States) James French	1:57.189	+5.972	15
16	PC	8	(United States) Starworks Motorsport	(Venezuela) Alex Popow	1:57.241	+6.024	16
17	P	50	(United States) Highway to Help	(United States) Jim Pace	1:57.422	+6.205	17
18	PC	85	(United States) JDC-Miller MotorSports	(Canada) Misha Goikhberg	1:57.630	+6.413	18
19	PC	88	(United States) Starworks Motorsport	(United States) Sean Johnston	1:58.218	+7.001	19
20	**GTLM**	**25**	**(United States) BMW Team RLL**	**(United States) Bill Auberlen**	**1:58.402**	**+7.185**	20‡
21	GTLM	100	(United States) BMW Team RLL	(United States) John Edwards	1:58.592	+7.375	21
22	GTLM	68	(United States) Scuderia Corsa	(Brazil) Daniel Serra	1:58.637	+7.420	22
23	GTLM	67	(United States) Ford Chip Ganassi Racing	(United Kingdom) Richard Westbrook	1:58.708	+7.491	23
24	GTLM	3	(United States) Corvette Racing	(Spain) Antonio García	1:58.856	+7.639	24
25	GTLM	4	(United States) Corvette Racing	(United Kingdom) Oliver Gavin	1:58.878	+7.661	25
26	GTLM	911	(United States) Porsche North America	(France) Patrick Pilet	1:59.009	+7.792	26
27	GTLM	62	(United States) Risi Competizione	(Finland) Toni Vilander	1:59.020	+7.803	27
28	GTLM	66	(United States) Ford Chip Ganassi Racing	(Germany) Dirk Müller	1:59.053	+7.836	28
29	GTLM	912	(United States) Porsche North America	(France) Frédéric Makowiecki	1:59.170	+7.953	29
30	**GTD**	**63**	**(United States) Scuderia Corsa**	**(United States) Jeff Segal**	**2:02.350**	**+11.133**	30‡
31	GTD	33	(United States) Riley Motorsports	(Netherlands) Jeroen Bleekemolen	2:02.386	+11.169	31
32	GTD	96	(United States) Turner Motorsport	(Germany) Jens Klingmann	2:02.660	+11.443	32
33	GTD	23	(United States) Team Seattle/Alex Job Racing	(Germany) Mario Farnbacher	2:03.037	+11.820	33
34	GTD	22	(United States) Alex Job Racing	(United States) Leh Keen	2:03.241	+12.024	34
35	GTD	73	(United States) Park Place Motorsports	(United States) Patrick Lindsey	2:03.284	+12.067	35
36	GTD	51	(Italy) Spirit of Race	(Italy) Raffaele Giammaria	2:03.340	+12.123	36
37	GTD	16	(United States) Change Racing	(United States) Spencer Pumpelly	2:03.455	+12.238	37
38	GTD	97	(United States) Turner Motorsport	(Finland) Markus Palttala	2:03.625	+12.408	38
39	GTD	21	(Austria) Konrad Motorsport	(Austria) Christopher Zöchling	2:03.822	+12.605	39
40	GTD	9	(United States) Stevenson Motorsports	(United States) Lawson Aschenbach	2:03.856	+12.639	40
41	GTD	11	(United States) Change Racing	(United States) Townsend Bell	2:03.861	+12.644	41
42	GTD	27	(United States) Dream Racing	(Italy) Fabio Babini	2:03.933	+12.716	42
43	GTD	98	(United Kingdom) Aston Martin Racing	(Canada) Paul Dalla Lana	2:04.204	+12.987	43
44	GTD	48	(United States) Paul Miller Racing	(United States) Bryce Miller	2:04.260	+13.043	44
45	GTD	28	(Austria) Konrad Motorsport	(Germany) Christopher Brück	2:04.302	+13.085	45
46	GTD	44	(United States) Magnus Racing	(United States) John Potter	2:04.857	+13.640	46
47	GTD	540	(United States) Black Swan Racing	(United States) Tim Pappas	2:07.095	+15.878	47
48	GTD	45	(United States) Flying Lizard Motorsports	(United States) Tracy Krohn	2:07.338	+16.121	48
49	GTD	6	(United States) Stevenson Motorsports	No Time Established			49

== Post-race ==
=== Race results ===
Class winners are denoted in bold. P stands for Prototype, PC (Prototype Challenge), GTLM (Grand Touring Le Mans) and GTD (Grand Touring Daytona).

Final race classification
Pos	Class	No.	Team	Drivers	Chassis	Tire	Laps	Time/Retired
Pos	Class	No.	Team	Drivers	Engine	Tire	Laps	Time/Retired
1	**P**	**2**	**(United States) Tequila Patrón ESM**	**(United States) Scott Sharp (United States) Ed Brown (United States) Johannes van Overbeek (Brazil) Pipo Derani**	**Ligier JS P2**	C	**238**	**12:00:59.881**
1	**P**	**2**	**(United States) Tequila Patrón ESM**	**(United States) Scott Sharp (United States) Ed Brown (United States) Johannes van Overbeek (Brazil) Pipo Derani**	**Honda HR35TT 3.5 L V6 Turbo**	C	**238**	**12:00:59.881**
2	P	31	(United States) Action Express Racing	(United States) Dane Cameron (United States) Eric Curran (United States) Scott Pruett	Corvette Daytona Prototype	C	238	+2.926
2	P	31	(United States) Action Express Racing	(United States) Dane Cameron (United States) Eric Curran (United States) Scott Pruett	Chevrolet 5.5 L V8	C	238	+2.926
3	P	5	(United States) Action Express Racing	(Portugal) João Barbosa (Brazil) Christian Fittipaldi (Portugal) Filipe Albuquerque	Corvette Daytona Prototype	C	238	+3.940
3	P	5	(United States) Action Express Racing	(Portugal) João Barbosa (Brazil) Christian Fittipaldi (Portugal) Filipe Albuquerque	Chevrolet 5.5 L V8	C	238	+3.940
4	P	81	(United States) DragonSpeed	(Sweden) Henrik Hedman (France) Nicolas Lapierre (France) Nicolas Minassian	Oreca 05	C	238	+4.339
4	P	81	(United States) DragonSpeed	(Sweden) Henrik Hedman (France) Nicolas Lapierre (France) Nicolas Minassian	Nissan VK45DE 4.5 L V8	C	238	+4.339
5	P	90	(United States) VisitFlorida Racing	(Belgium) Marc Goossens (United Kingdom) Ryan Dalziel (United States) Ryan Hunter-Reay	Corvette Daytona Prototype	C	238	+18.078
5	P	90	(United States) VisitFlorida Racing	(Belgium) Marc Goossens (United Kingdom) Ryan Dalziel (United States) Ryan Hunter-Reay	Chevrolet 5.5 L V8	C	238	+18.078
6	P	55	(United States) Mazda Motorsports	(United States) Jonathan Bomarito (United States) Tristan Nunez (United States) Spencer Pigot	Mazda Prototype	C	238	+29.735
6	P	55	(United States) Mazda Motorsports	(United States) Jonathan Bomarito (United States) Tristan Nunez (United States) Spencer Pigot	Mazda MZ2.0T 2.0 L I4 Turbo	C	238	+29.735
7 DNF	P	60	(United States) Michael Shank Racing with Curb/Agajanian	(United States) John Pew (Brazil) Oswaldo Negri Jr. (France) Olivier Pla	Ligier JS P2	C	237	Rear Suspension
7 DNF	P	60	(United States) Michael Shank Racing with Curb/Agajanian	(United States) John Pew (Brazil) Oswaldo Negri Jr. (France) Olivier Pla	Honda HR35TT 3.5 L V6 Turbo	C	237	Rear Suspension
8	P	70	(United States) Mazda Motorsports	(United States) Tom Long (United States) Joel Miller (United Kingdom) Ben Devlin (Japan) Keiko Ihara	Mazda Prototype	C	237	+1 Lap
8	P	70	(United States) Mazda Motorsports	(United States) Tom Long (United States) Joel Miller (United Kingdom) Ben Devlin (Japan) Keiko Ihara	Mazda MZ2.0T 2.0 L I4 Turbo	C	237	+1 Lap
9	**PC**	**54**	**(United States) CORE Autosport**	**(United States) Jon Bennett (United States) Colin Braun (Canada) Mark Wilkins**	**Oreca FLM09**	C	**236**	**+2 Laps**
9	**PC**	**54**	**(United States) CORE Autosport**	**(United States) Jon Bennett (United States) Colin Braun (Canada) Mark Wilkins**	**Chevrolet LS3 6.2 L V8**	C	**236**	**+2 Laps**
10	PC	52	(United States) PR1/Mathiasen Motorsports	(United Kingdom) Tom Kimber-Smith (Mexico) José Gutiérrez (United States) Robert Alon	Oreca FLM09	C	236	+2 Laps
10	PC	52	(United States) PR1/Mathiasen Motorsports	(United Kingdom) Tom Kimber-Smith (Mexico) José Gutiérrez (United States) Robert Alon	Chevrolet LS3 6.2 L V8	C	236	+2 Laps
11	**GTLM**	**4**	**(United States) Corvette Racing**	**(United Kingdom) Oliver Gavin (United States) Tommy Milner (Switzerland) Marcel Fässler**	**Chevrolet Corvette C7.R**	MI	**235**	**+3 Laps**
11	**GTLM**	**4**	**(United States) Corvette Racing**	**(United Kingdom) Oliver Gavin (United States) Tommy Milner (Switzerland) Marcel Fässler**	**Chevrolet 5.5 L V8**	MI	**235**	**+3 Laps**
12	GTLM	25	(United States) BMW Team RLL	(United States) Bill Auberlen (Germany) Dirk Werner (Canada) Bruno Spengler	BMW M6 GTLM	MI	235	+3 Laps
12	GTLM	25	(United States) BMW Team RLL	(United States) Bill Auberlen (Germany) Dirk Werner (Canada) Bruno Spengler	BMW 4.4 L Turbo V8	MI	235	+3 Laps
13	GTLM	912	(United States) Porsche North America	(New Zealand) Earl Bamber (France) Frédéric Makowiecki (Denmark) Michael Christensen	Porsche 911 RSR	MI	235	+3 Laps
13	GTLM	912	(United States) Porsche North America	(New Zealand) Earl Bamber (France) Frédéric Makowiecki (Denmark) Michael Christensen	Porsche 4.0 L Flat-6	MI	235	+3 Laps
14	GTLM	62	(United States) Risi Competizione	(Italy) Giancarlo Fisichella (Finland) Toni Vilander (Italy) Davide Rigon	Ferrari 488 GTE	MI	235	+3 Laps
14	GTLM	62	(United States) Risi Competizione	(Italy) Giancarlo Fisichella (Finland) Toni Vilander (Italy) Davide Rigon	Ferrari F154CB 3.9 L Turbo V8	MI	235	+3 Laps
15	GTLM	67	(United States) Ford Chip Ganassi Racing	(Australia) Ryan Briscoe (United Kingdom) Richard Westbrook (New Zealand) Scott Dixon	Ford GT	MI	235	+3 Laps
15	GTLM	67	(United States) Ford Chip Ganassi Racing	(Australia) Ryan Briscoe (United Kingdom) Richard Westbrook (New Zealand) Scott Dixon	Ford 3.5 L EcoBoost V6	MI	235	+3 Laps
16	GTLM	100	(United States) BMW Team RLL	(United States) John Edwards (Germany) Lucas Luhr (Canada) Kuno Wittmer	BMW M6 GTLM	MI	235	+3 Laps
16	GTLM	100	(United States) BMW Team RLL	(United States) John Edwards (Germany) Lucas Luhr (Canada) Kuno Wittmer	BMW 4.4 L Turbo V8	MI	235	+3 Laps
17	PC	8	(United States) Starworks Motorsport	(Venezuela) Alex Popow (Netherlands) Renger van der Zande (Denmark) David Heinemeier Hansson	Oreca FLM09	C	233	+5 Laps
17	PC	8	(United States) Starworks Motorsport	(Venezuela) Alex Popow (Netherlands) Renger van der Zande (Denmark) David Heinemeier Hansson	Chevrolet LS3 6.2 L V8	C	233	+5 Laps
18	GTLM	68	(United States) Scuderia Corsa	(Italy) Alessandro Pier Guidi (Brazil) Daniel Serra (Italy) Andrea Bertolini	Ferrari 488 GTE	MI	233	+5 Laps
18	GTLM	68	(United States) Scuderia Corsa	(Italy) Alessandro Pier Guidi (Brazil) Daniel Serra (Italy) Andrea Bertolini	Ferrari F154CB 3.9 L Turbo V8	MI	233	+5 Laps
19	PC	85	(United States) JDC-Miller MotorSports	(Canada) Misha Goikhberg (United States) Chris Miller (South Africa) Stephen Simpson (United States) Kenton Koch	Oreca FLM09	C	232	+6 Laps
19	PC	85	(United States) JDC-Miller MotorSports	(Canada) Misha Goikhberg (United States) Chris Miller (South Africa) Stephen Simpson (United States) Kenton Koch	Chevrolet LS3 6.2 L V8	C	232	+6 Laps
20	PC	38	(United States) Performance Tech Motorsports	(United States) James French (Canada) Kyle Marcelli (United States) Josh Norman	Oreca FLM09	C	231	+7 Laps
20	PC	38	(United States) Performance Tech Motorsports	(United States) James French (Canada) Kyle Marcelli (United States) Josh Norman	Chevrolet LS3 6.2 L V8	C	231	+7 Laps
21 DNF	P	0	(United States) Panoz DeltaWing Racing	(United Kingdom) Katherine Legge (United States) Sean Rayhall (United Kingdom) Andy Meyrick	DeltaWing DWC13	C	229	Steering
21 DNF	P	0	(United States) Panoz DeltaWing Racing	(United Kingdom) Katherine Legge (United States) Sean Rayhall (United Kingdom) Andy Meyrick	Élan (Mazda) 1.9 L I4 Turbo	C	229	Steering
22	**GTD**	**63**	**(United States) Scuderia Corsa**	**(Denmark) Christina Nielsen (Italy) Alessandro Balzan (United States) Jeff Segal**	**Ferrari 488 GT3**	C	**229**	**+9 Laps**
22	**GTD**	**63**	**(United States) Scuderia Corsa**	**(Denmark) Christina Nielsen (Italy) Alessandro Balzan (United States) Jeff Segal**	**Ferrari F154CB 3.9 L Turbo V8**	C	**229**	**+9 Laps**
23	GTD	96	(United States) Turner Motorsport	(United States) Bret Curtis (Germany) Jens Klingmann (United States) Ashley Freiberg	BMW M6 GT3	C	229	+9 Laps
23	GTD	96	(United States) Turner Motorsport	(United States) Bret Curtis (Germany) Jens Klingmann (United States) Ashley Freiberg	BMW 4.4 L Turbo V8	C	229	+9 Laps
24	GTD	44	(United States) Magnus Racing	(United States) John Potter (United States) Andy Lally (Germany) Marco Seefried	Audi R8 LMS	C	229	+9 Laps
24	GTD	44	(United States) Magnus Racing	(United States) John Potter (United States) Andy Lally (Germany) Marco Seefried	Audi 5.2 L V10	C	229	+9 Laps
25	GTD	23	(United States) Team Seattle/Alex Job Racing	(Germany) Mario Farnbacher (Spain) Alex Riberas (United Kingdom) Ian James	Porsche 911 GT3 R	C	229	+9 Laps
25	GTD	23	(United States) Team Seattle/Alex Job Racing	(Germany) Mario Farnbacher (Spain) Alex Riberas (United Kingdom) Ian James	Porsche 4.0 L Flat-6	C	229	+9 Laps
26	GTLM	66	(United States) Ford Chip Ganassi Racing	(United States) Joey Hand (Germany) Dirk Müller (France) Sébastien Bourdais	Ford GT	MI	229	+9 Laps
26	GTLM	66	(United States) Ford Chip Ganassi Racing	(United States) Joey Hand (Germany) Dirk Müller (France) Sébastien Bourdais	Ford 3.5 L EcoBoost V6	MI	229	+9 Laps
27	GTD	22	(United States) Alex Job Racing	(United States) Cooper MacNeil (United States) Leh Keen (United States) Gunnar Jeannette	Porsche 911 GT3 R	C	229	+9 Laps
27	GTD	22	(United States) Alex Job Racing	(United States) Cooper MacNeil (United States) Leh Keen (United States) Gunnar Jeannette	Porsche 4.0 L Flat-6	C	229	+9 Laps
28	GTD	48	(United States) Paul Miller Racing	(United States) Bryce Miller (United States) Bryan Sellers (United States) Madison Snow	Lamborghini Huracán GT3	C	229	+9 Laps
28	GTD	48	(United States) Paul Miller Racing	(United States) Bryce Miller (United States) Bryan Sellers (United States) Madison Snow	Lamborghini 5.2 L V10	C	229	+9 Laps
29	GTD	97	(United States) Turner Motorsport	(United States) Michael Marsal (Finland) Markus Palttala (Finland) Jesse Krohn	BMW M6 GT3	C	229	+9 Laps
29	GTD	97	(United States) Turner Motorsport	(United States) Michael Marsal (Finland) Markus Palttala (Finland) Jesse Krohn	BMW 4.4 L Turbo V8	C	229	+9 Laps
30	GTD	6	(United States) Stevenson Motorsports	(United Kingdom) Robin Liddell (United States) Andrew Davis (United States) Connor De Phillippi	Audi R8 LMS	C	229	+9 Laps
30	GTD	6	(United States) Stevenson Motorsports	(United Kingdom) Robin Liddell (United States) Andrew Davis (United States) Connor De Phillippi	Audi 5.2 L V10	C	229	+9 Laps
31	GTD	51	(Italy) Spirit of Race	(Italy) Matteo Cressoni (Italy) Raffaele Giammaria (United States) Peter Mann	Ferrari 488 GT3	C	229	+9 Laps
31	GTD	51	(Italy) Spirit of Race	(Italy) Matteo Cressoni (Italy) Raffaele Giammaria (United States) Peter Mann	Ferrari F154CB 3.9 L Turbo V8	C	229	+9 Laps
32	GTD	98	(United Kingdom) Aston Martin Racing	(Canada) Paul Dalla Lana (Portugal) Pedro Lamy (Austria) Mathias Lauda (New Zealand) Richie Stanaway	Aston Martin Vantage GT3	C	229	+9 Laps
32	GTD	98	(United Kingdom) Aston Martin Racing	(Canada) Paul Dalla Lana (Portugal) Pedro Lamy (Austria) Mathias Lauda (New Zealand) Richie Stanaway	Aston Martin 6.0 L V12	C	229	+9 Laps
33	PC	20	(United States) BAR1 Motorsports	(United Kingdom) Johnny Mowlem (United States) Marc Drumwright (United Kingdom) Ryan Lewis (United States) Don Yount	Oreca FLM09	C	228	+10 Laps
33	PC	20	(United States) BAR1 Motorsports	(United Kingdom) Johnny Mowlem (United States) Marc Drumwright (United Kingdom) Ryan Lewis (United States) Don Yount	Chevrolet LS3 6.2 L V8	C	228	+10 Laps
34	GTD	16	(United States) Change Racing	(United States) Spencer Pumpelly (United States) Corey Lewis (United States) Al Carter	Lamborghini Huracán GT3	C	227	+11 Laps
34	GTD	16	(United States) Change Racing	(United States) Spencer Pumpelly (United States) Corey Lewis (United States) Al Carter	Lamborghini 5.2 L V10	C	227	+11 Laps
35	GTD	33	(United States) Riley Motorsports	(United States) Ben Keating (Netherlands) Jeroen Bleekemolen (United States) Marc Miller	Dodge Viper GT3-R	C	227	+11 Laps
35	GTD	33	(United States) Riley Motorsports	(United States) Ben Keating (Netherlands) Jeroen Bleekemolen (United States) Marc Miller	Dodge 8.3 L V10	C	227	+11 Laps
36	GTD	540	(United States) Black Swan Racing	(United States) Tim Pappas (Netherlands) Nick Catsburg (United States) Patrick Long (United States) Andy Pilgrim	Porsche 911 GT3 R	C	226	+12 Laps
36	GTD	540	(United States) Black Swan Racing	(United States) Tim Pappas (Netherlands) Nick Catsburg (United States) Patrick Long (United States) Andy Pilgrim	Porsche 4.0 L Flat-6	C	226	+12 Laps
37	GTD	28	(Austria) Konrad Motorsport	(Austria) Franz Konrad (United States) Terry Borcheller (Germany) Christopher Brück (United Kingdom) Josh Webster	Lamborghini Huracán GT3	C	226	+12 Laps
37	GTD	28	(Austria) Konrad Motorsport	(Austria) Franz Konrad (United States) Terry Borcheller (Germany) Christopher Brück (United Kingdom) Josh Webster	Lamborghini 5.2 L V10	C	226	+12 Laps
38	GTD	45	(United States) Flying Lizard Motorsports	(United States) Tracy Krohn (Sweden) Niclas Jönsson (Germany) Pierre Kaffer	Audi R8 LMS	C	220	+18 Laps
38	GTD	45	(United States) Flying Lizard Motorsports	(United States) Tracy Krohn (Sweden) Niclas Jönsson (Germany) Pierre Kaffer	Audi 5.2 L V10	C	220	+18 Laps
39 DNF	P	50	(United States) Highway to Help	(United States) Jim Pace (United States) Byron DeFoor (United Kingdom) David Hinton (United States) Dorsey Schroeder	Riley Mk XXVI DP	C	212	Crash
39 DNF	P	50	(United States) Highway to Help	(United States) Jim Pace (United States) Byron DeFoor (United Kingdom) David Hinton (United States) Dorsey Schroeder	Dinan (BMW) 5.0 L V8	C	212	Crash
40 DNF	PC	88	(United States) Starworks Motorsport	(United States) Sean Johnston (Germany) Maro Engel (United Kingdom) Michael Lyons	Oreca FLM09	C	209	Brakes
40 DNF	PC	88	(United States) Starworks Motorsport	(United States) Sean Johnston (Germany) Maro Engel (United Kingdom) Michael Lyons	Chevrolet LS3 6.2 L V8	C	209	Brakes
41	GTLM	3	(United States) Corvette Racing	(Spain) Antonio García (Denmark) Jan Magnussen (Germany) Mike Rockenfeller	Chevrolet Corvette C7.R	MI	202	+36 Laps
41	GTLM	3	(United States) Corvette Racing	(Spain) Antonio García (Denmark) Jan Magnussen (Germany) Mike Rockenfeller	Chevrolet 5.5 L V8	MI	202	+36 Laps
42	P	24	(United States) Alegra Motorsports	(United States) Carlos de Quesada (Canada) Daniel Morad (United States) Cameron Lawrence (Germany) Dominik Farnbacher	Riley Mk XXVI DP	C	195	+43 Laps
42	P	24	(United States) Alegra Motorsports	(United States) Carlos de Quesada (Canada) Daniel Morad (United States) Cameron Lawrence (Germany) Dominik Farnbacher	Dinan (BMW) 5.0 L V8	C	195	+43 Laps
43 DNF	P	10	(United States) Wayne Taylor Racing	(United States) Ricky Taylor (United States) Jordan Taylor (Italy) Max Angelelli (Brazil) Rubens Barrichello	Corvette Daytona Prototype	C	169	Electrical
43 DNF	P	10	(United States) Wayne Taylor Racing	(United States) Ricky Taylor (United States) Jordan Taylor (Italy) Max Angelelli (Brazil) Rubens Barrichello	Chevrolet 5.5 L V8	C	169	Electrical
44 DNF	GTD	9	(United States) Stevenson Motorsports	(United States) Lawson Aschenbach (United States) Matt Bell (South Africa) Dion von Moltke	Audi R8 LMS	C	165	Engine
44 DNF	GTD	9	(United States) Stevenson Motorsports	(United States) Lawson Aschenbach (United States) Matt Bell (South Africa) Dion von Moltke	Audi 5.2 L V10	C	165	Engine
45 DNF	GTD	73	(United States) Park Place Motorsports	(United States) Patrick Lindsey (Germany) Jörg Bergmeister (United States) Matt McMurry (Belgium) Jan Heylen	Porsche 911 GT3 R	C	145	Crash
45 DNF	GTD	73	(United States) Park Place Motorsports	(United States) Patrick Lindsey (Germany) Jörg Bergmeister (United States) Matt McMurry (Belgium) Jan Heylen	Porsche 4.0 L Flat-6	C	145	Crash
46 DNF	GTLM	911	(United States) Porsche North America	(France) Patrick Pilet (United Kingdom) Nick Tandy (France) Kévin Estre	Porsche 911 RSR	MI	116	Crash
46 DNF	GTLM	911	(United States) Porsche North America	(France) Patrick Pilet (United Kingdom) Nick Tandy (France) Kévin Estre	Porsche 4.0 L Flat-6	MI	116	Crash
47 DNF	GTD	11	(United States) Change Racing	(United States) Bill Sweedler (United States) Townsend Bell (Italy) Richard Antinucci	Lamborghini Huracán GT3	C	30	Crash
47 DNF	GTD	11	(United States) Change Racing	(United States) Bill Sweedler (United States) Townsend Bell (Italy) Richard Antinucci	Lamborghini 5.2 L V10	C	30	Crash
48 DNF	GTD	27	(United States) Dream Racing	(Italy) Paolo Ruberti (Monaco) Cédric Sbirrazzuoli (Italy) Fabio Babini (Italy) Luca Persiani	Lamborghini Huracán GT3	C	27	Did Not Finish
48 DNF	GTD	27	(United States) Dream Racing	(Italy) Paolo Ruberti (Monaco) Cédric Sbirrazzuoli (Italy) Fabio Babini (Italy) Luca Persiani	Lamborghini 5.2 L V10	C	27	Did Not Finish
DNS	GTD	21	(Austria) Konrad Motorsport	(Germany) Pierre Ehret (Austria) Christopher Zöchling (Germany) Jürgen Krebs	Lamborghini Huracán GT3	C	-	Did Not Start
DNS	GTD	21	(Austria) Konrad Motorsport	(Germany) Pierre Ehret (Austria) Christopher Zöchling (Germany) Jürgen Krebs	Lamborghini 5.2 L V10	C	-	Did Not Start

Tyre manufacturers
Key
Symbol	Tyre manufacturer
**C**	Continental
**MI**	Michelin

IMSA SportsCar Championship
Previous race: 24 Hours of Daytona	2016 season	Next race: 2016 Tequila Patrón Sports Car Showcase
