= Lloyd Read =

Welsh racing driver

- Nationality: (United Kingdom) British
- Born: November 29, 1990 (age 35) Cwmbran, Wales, Great Britain
- Debut season: 2014
- Current team: Bryan Herta Autosport

Indy Lights
- Car number: 28
- Starts: 6
- Wins: 0
- Poles: 0
- Best finish: 8th

Previous series
- 2011 2013: Formula Car Challenge; Pro Mazda Championship

Championship titles
- 2011: Formula Car Challenge Pro Formula Mazda

Lloyd Read (born November 29, 1990) is a Welsh racing driver who has lived in California since childhood.

Born in Newport, Read moved to the United States at the age of six. He raced karts in both the UK and the USA. In 2011, he began racing in Sports Car Club of America amateur competition in Formula Enterprises. He also made his Star Mazda Championship debut. In 2012, he placed second in the Formula Car Challenge driving a Star Mazda car and made two Star Mazda Championship starts. In 2013, Read competed in the Pro Mazda Championship (formerly Star Mazda) full-time for JDC MotorSports. Read placed eighth in points with a best finish of fourth in race 1 in Toronto. On November 18, 2013, Read announced that he would compete in Indy Lights in 2014 with Bryan Herta Autosport/Jeffrey Mark Motorsport.

Read attended Saint Mary's College of California and resides in Danville, California.

== Racing record ==
=== Pro Mazda Championship ===
Year	Team	1	2	3	4	5	6	7	8	9	10	11	12	13	14	15	16	Rank	Points
2013	JDC MotorSports	AUS; 11	AUS; 9	STP; 9	STP; 9	IND; 9	IOW; 9	TOR; 4	TOR; 10	MOS; 9	MOS; 7	MOH; 7	MOH; 9	TRO; 7	TRO; 10	HOU; 7	HOU; 14	8th	198

=== Indy Lights ===
Year	Team	1	2	3	4	5	6	7	8	9	10	11	12	13	14	Rank	Points	Ref
2014	Bryan Herta Autosport Jeffrey Mark Motorsport	STP; 11	LBH; 11	ALA; 11	ALA; 9	IND; 10	IND; 9	INDY	POC	TOR	MOH	MOH	MIL	SNM	SNM	11th	101	

^{*} Season still in progress.
