= Grand Prix of Baltimore =

Auto race held in Baltimore, Maryland, US

Grand Prix of Baltimore presented by SRT

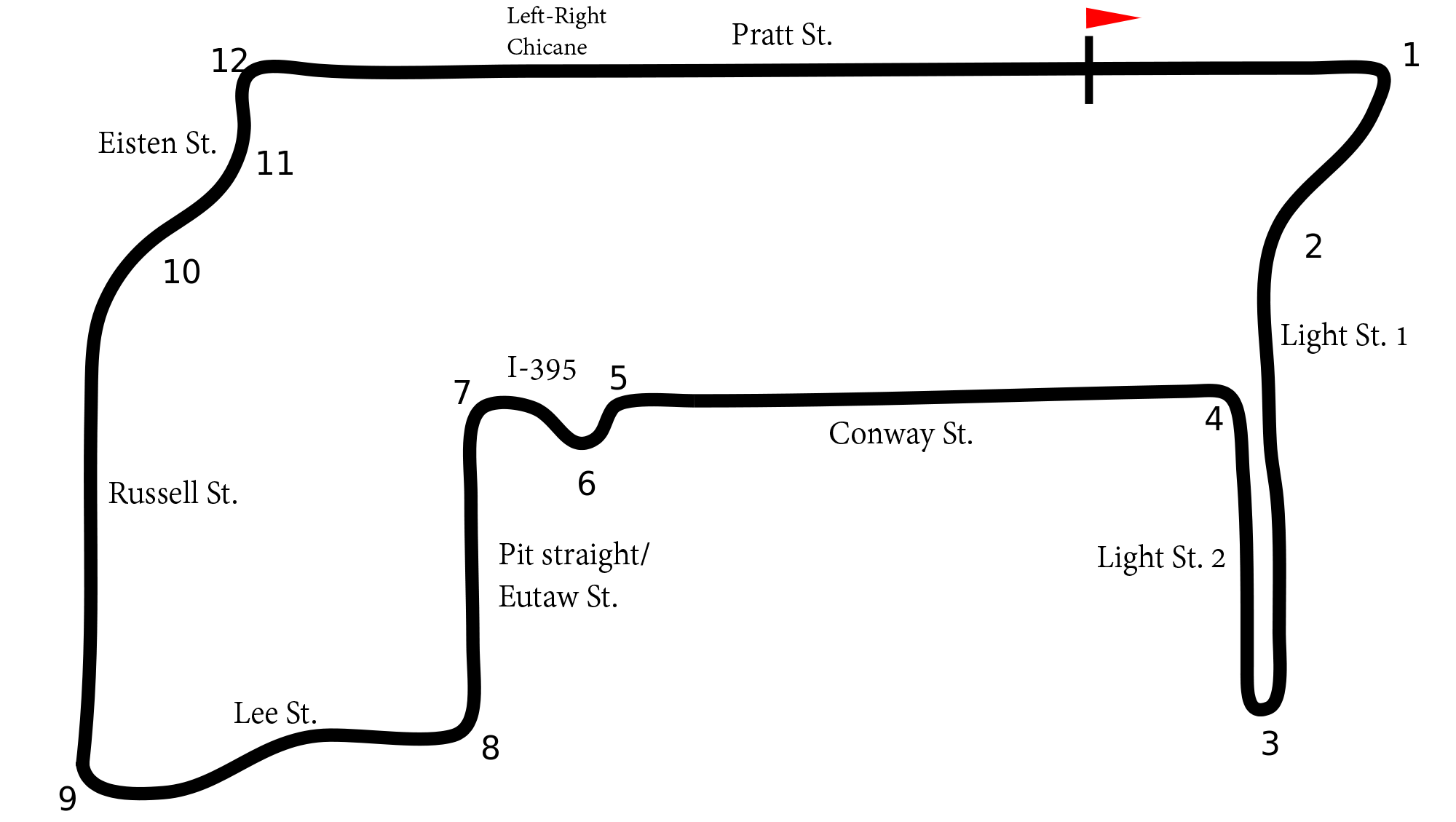

IndyCar Series
- Location: Baltimore, Maryland, USA; 39°17′N 76°37′W
- Corporate sponsor: Street and Racing Technology
- First race: 2011
- Last race: 2013

Circuit information
- Surface: Asphalt/Concrete
- Length: 2.040 mi (3.283 km)
- Turns: 12
- Lap record: 1:19.0055 ( (Australia) Will Power, Dallara DW12, 2012, IndyCar)

The Grand Prix of Baltimore presented by SRT was an IndyCar Series and American Le Mans Series race for 3 years held on a street circuit in Baltimore, Maryland. The inaugural race was held on September 4, 2011. ESPN said it was the best inaugural street race in North America in the last 30 years. The races were contested on a temporary street circuit around the Inner Harbor area of downtown Baltimore.

Baltimore Racing Development signed a multi-year contract with IndyCar and the City of Baltimore to organize the race; the city terminated its contract with BRD at the end of 2011 due to unpaid debts. On February 15, 2012, the city of Baltimore had entered into a five-year agreement with Downforce Racing to manage the race. However, Downforce failed to fulfill their obligations to the city. On May 10, 2012, Race On LLC and Andretti Sports Marketing, led by racing legend Michael Andretti, took over the organization and promotion of the event. Gregory O'Neill and J.P. Grant III own Race On LLC. On September 13, 2013, the promoters announced that they would not hold the race in 2014 or 2015 due to scheduling conflicts.

== Circuit ==
The circuit is a 2.040 mi (3.283 km) temporary street circuit that is run in a clockwise direction, with the start-finish line located on Pratt Street, passing by various Baltimore landmarks, including the Baltimore Convention Center, the Inner Harbor, and Camden Yards. The cars travel east along Pratt Street to Light Street, where they turn right and travel south along the northbound lanes to the intersection between Light and Lee Streets. This forms the slowest corner on the circuit, a right-hand hairpin turn that leads the cars back north along Light Street's southbound lanes to Conway Street. The cars turn left here and head west along Conway Street to the Camden Station. They then navigate a chicane designed to slow the cars down before the pit entry — the circuit is unusual in that the pits are not located on the main straight — and turn left again. The cars circle Oriole Park at Camden Yards stadium to Russell Street, where they turn north once more. This short straight feeds into a pair of sweepers, right and then left, that lead to Pratt Street and the 0.5-mile (0.80 km) long main straight. Finally, the cars navigate a temporary chicane at the junction of Pratt and Howard Streets as they cross train tracks.

Following the 2011 race, several drivers expressed the opinion that the temporary chicane on the main straight was unnecessary, and it was subsequently removed ahead of the 2012 race to increase entry speeds into the first corner. However, during the first practice sessions for the 2012 race, several drivers — including Simon Pagenaud and Oriol Servià — became airborne as they crossed the train tracks. IndyCar officials abandoned the practice session and reinstalled the temporary chicane.

Other changes for the 2012 race included the re-profiling of the chicane before the pit entry. In 2011, the circuit was narrowed to a single lane with several tight corners to force cars to slow down. This was simplified for 2012 and widened, slowing the cars down, but preventing the field from being forced through a bottleneck.

== Past winners ==
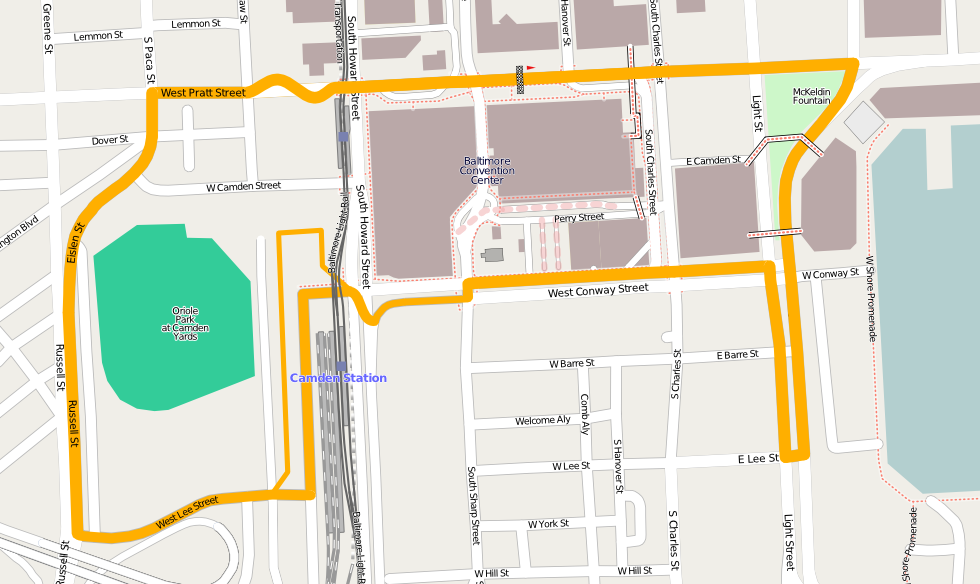
The circuit in 2011

=== IndyCar Series ===
Season	Date	Driver	Team	Chassis	Engine	Race Distance		Race Time	Average Speed (mph)	Report
Season	Date	Driver	Team	Chassis	Engine	Laps	Miles (km)	Race Time	Average Speed (mph)	Report
2011	September 4	(Australia) Will Power	Penske Racing	Dallara	Honda	75	153 (246.23)	2:02:19	75.046	Report
2012	September 2	(United States) Ryan Hunter-Reay	Andretti Autosport	Dallara	Chevrolet	75	153 (246.23)	2:09:03	71.136	Report
2013	September 1	(France) Simon Pagenaud	Schmidt Motorsports	Dallara	Honda	75	153 (246.23)	2:16:32	67.234	Report

=== American Le Mans Series ===
Season	LMP1 Winning Team	LMP2 Winning Team	LMPC Winning Team	GT Winning Team	GTC Winning Team	Results
Season	LMP1 Winning Drivers	LMP2 Winning Drivers	LMPC Winning Drivers	GT Winning Drivers	GTC Winning Drivers	Results
2011	(United States) No. 20 Oryx Dyson Racing	Did not participate	(United States) No. 37 Intersport Racing	(United States) No. 17 Team Falken Tire	(United States) No. 54 Black Swan Racing	Results
2011	(United Arab Emirates) Humaid Al-Masaood (United Kingdom) Steven Kane	Did not participate	(Canada) Kyle Marcelli (United States) Tomy Drissi	(Germany) Wolf Henzler (United States) Bryan Sellers	(United States) Tim Pappas (Netherlands) Jeroen Bleekemolen	Results
2012	(United States) No. 20 Dyson Racing Team	(United States) No. 055 Level 5 Motorsports	(United States) No. 06 CORE Autosport	(United States) No. 17 Team Falken Tire	(United States) No. 68 TRG	Results
2012	(United States) Michael Marsal (United States) Eric Lux	(United States) Scott Tucker (France) Christophe Bouchut	(Venezuela) Alex Popow (United Kingdom) Ryan Dalziel	(Germany) Wolf Henzler (United States) Bryan Sellers	(United States) Al Carter (France) Patrick Pilet	Results
2013	(United States) #6 Muscle Milk Pickett Racing	(United States) #552 Level 5 Motorsports	(United States) #18 Performance Tech Motorsports	(United States) #3 Corvette Racing	(United States) #44 Flying Lizard Motorsports	Report
2013	(Germany) Lucas Luhr (Germany) Klaus Graf	(United Kingdom) Marino Franchitti (United States) Guy Cosmo	(United States) Tristan Nunez (United States) Charlie Shears	(Denmark) Jan Magnussen (Spain) Antonio García	(South Africa) Dion von Moltke (United States) Seth Neiman	Report

=== Support races ===
Indy Lights
Season	Date	Winning driver
2011	September 4	(Colombia) Gustavo Yacamán
2012	September 2	(France) Tristan Vautier
2013	September 1	(United Kingdom) Jack Hawksworth

Star Mazda Championship
Season	Date	Winning driver
2011	September 4	(France) Tristan Vautier
2012	September 1	(United Kingdom) Jack Hawksworth
2012	September 2	(United States) Sage Karam

U.S. F2000 National Championship
Season	Date	Winning driver
2011	September 3	(United Kingdom) Wayne Boyd
2011	September 4	(United States) Spencer Pigot
2012	September 1	(United States) Spencer Pigot
2012	September 2	(Australia) Matthew Brabham

== Lap records ==
The unofficial all-time outright track record set during a race weekend is 1:17.5921, set by Will Power in a Dallara DW12 during qualifying for the 2012 Grand Prix of Baltimore. The fastest official race lap records at the Grand Prix of Baltimore are listed as:

Category	Time	Driver	Vehicle	Event
Grand Prix Circuit (2011–2013): 2.040 mi (3.283 km)
IndyCar	1:19.0055	Will Power	Dallara DW12	2012 Grand Prix of Baltimore
Indy Lights	1:23.9799	Sebastián Saavedra	Dallara IPS	2012 Baltimore Indy Lights round
LMP1	1:24.982	Lucas Luhr	HPD ARX-03a	2012 Baltimore Sports Car Challenge
LMP2	1:27.641	Christophe Bouchut	HPD ARX-03b	2012 Baltimore Sports Car Challenge
Star Mazda	1:28.860	Sage Karam	Star Formula Mazda 'Pro'	2012 Baltimore Star Mazda Championship round
LMPC	1:29.026	Bruno Junqueira	Oreca FLM09	2012 Baltimore Sports Car Challenge
GT2	1:30.313	Oliver Gavin	Chevrolet Corvette C6 ZR1	2012 Baltimore Sports Car Challenge
US F2000	1:31.645	Matthew Brabham	Van Diemen DP08	2012 Baltimore USF2000 round
GTC	1:35.312	Damien Faulkner	Porsche 911 (997) GT3 Cup	2012 Baltimore Sports Car Challenge

== Controversy ==
Along with the closing of the commercial center of downtown Baltimore for track preparation, trees were removed from city streets, spawning a court case. Also, Baltimore Brew identified $42,400 in campaign contributions over the preceding four years to Mayor Stephanie Rawlings-Blake and other political officials from investors and businesses that stood to gain from the race being held.

After its inaugural run, it was reported that the race failed to bring as much economic activity to Baltimore as had been promised and that Baltimore Racing Development has had difficulties paying monies owed to local businesses and the state, the latter resulting in a $567,000 tax lien being filed. With Baltimore Racing Development $3 million in debt, including nearly $1.2 million owed to Baltimore City, the city terminated their contract with BRD at the end of 2011. This meant the race would only take place again if both the city and IndyCar approved a new organizer. IndyCar officials have expressed hope that a new organizer will be found. The city of Baltimore announced on February 10, 2012, that a five-year deal with race organizer Downforce Racing, LLC was being finalized and would be presented to the city Board of Estimates February 22. The new contract includes provisions such as a $3 per ticket surcharge for city services to reduce the risk of unpaid fees to the city.
