= Amlin =

British insurance company

MS Amlin
- Type: Private limited company
- Industry: Insurance, (Re)Insurer
- Founded: 1998
- Headquarters: 122 Leadenhall Street, London, United Kingdom
- Key people: Roger Taylor, (chairman); Charles Philipps, (CEO)
- Revenue: £2,476.4 million (2014)
- Number of employees: 1,700 in seven countries (2013)
- Parent: MS&AD Insurance Group
- Website: www.msamlin.com

MS Amlin Ltd is an insurer operating in the Lloyd's, UK, Continental Europe and Bermudian markets. Specialising in providing insurance cover to commercial enterprises and reinsurance protection to other insurance companies around the world, MS Amlin's shares were listed on the London Stock Exchange until it was acquired by Mitsui Sumitomo Insurance Group in February 2016.

== History ==
The company was formed on 28 September 1998 through the merger of Angerstein Underwriting Trust and Murray Lawrence Group syndicate (the name was derived by combining 'A' from Angerstein, 'ML' from Murray Lawrence Group and 'IN' from Insurance). However, the oldest part of the business (K J Coles Syndicate) dates back to 1903. In 2008 it bought Anglo French Underwriters and subsequently renamed it as Amlin France in 2010. In July 2009 it acquired Fortis Corporate Insurance for €350m only to be renamed Amlin Corporate Insurance.

On 8 September 2015, it was announced that Mitsui Sumitomo Insurance Group had agreed to buy the firm for £3.5bn. The acquisition was completed in February 2016.

MS Amlin was fined £9.7 million by the Prudential Regulation Authority for risk management failures in September 2022.

== Headquarters ==
As of September 2015, MS Amlin is based at 122 Leadenhall Street.

== Operations ==
MS Amlin is organised as follows:

- Amlin Bermuda
  - A branch of Amlin AG is a specialist, reinsurance underwriting business, formed in October 2005.
- Amlin Europe
  - A specialised insurer for large and medium-sized companies in continental Europe.
- Amlin London
  - Part of Amlin Underwriting Limited and writes insurance and reinsurance business through Syndicate 2001 at Lloyd's.
- Amlin Re Europe
  - Amlin Re Europe (ARE) is the Group's Zurich based reinsurance underwriting business. ARE commenced underwriting in October 2010 as a full service reinsurance operation.
- Amlin UK
  - Operates as part of Amlin Underwriting Limited and underwrites business through Syndicate 2001 at Lloyd's.

== Financial ratings ==
The three underwriting platforms within MS Amlin are financially rated separately:

- Syndicate 2001 (Reinsurance/Insurance)
  - A. M. Best: A+ (Superior)
  - Moody's Investors Service: A2 (Stable)
  - Standard & Poor's: Lloyd's Syndicate Assessment 4+ (Stable)
- Amlin AG (Reinsurance)
  - A. M. Best: A (Excellent)
  - Moody's Investors Service: A2 (Stable)
  - Standard & Poor's: A (Stable)
  - Fitch Ratings: A+ (stable)
- Amlin Europe NV
  - Fitch Ratings: A+ (stable)
  - Standard & Poor's: A- (Stable)

== Major shareholders ==
As of January 2014 the major shareholders in Amlin were:

- Invesco Ltd: 69,519,312 (13.9%)
- Baillie Gifford & Co: 25,136,807 (5.1%)
- BlackRock, Inc.: 24,551,817 (4.9%)
- Majedie Asset Management Ltd: 23,663,478 (4.8%)
- AXA S.A.: 23,197,732 (4.7%)
- JPMorgan Chase & Co: 19,624,490 (4.0%)

The above gives the shareholder name, followed by the number of shares owned and their subsequent percentage holding.

== Research ==
In early 2014, MS Amlin teamed up with the University of Oxford to study the dangers of relying on catastrophe predictions – in the latest sign of the industry's concern over the accuracy of computer models.

== Sponsorship ==
In 2009, the company signed a sponsorship deal with Rugby Union's European Rugby Cup to partner two rugby tournaments in Europe. Amlin is the title sponsor of the Amlin Challenge Cup and a premium partner of the Heineken Cup. In 2010 Essex County Cricket Club signed Amlin as its sponsor and in early 2014 Amlin signed a three-year deal to become the platinum sponsor of Essex County Cricket Club. The company also sponsors the Eventing Grand Prix at Hickstead and the UK Youth London Art Show. Amlin announced the sponsorship of the FIA Formula E Championship racing team Amlin Aguri in 2014 and Andretti Autosport in 2015.

== Notable losses ==
On 11 September 2001 Syndicate 2001 suffered a $137.2m loss from the terrorist attacks that day. In 2011 Amlin made significant losses after £500m in claims from disasters including the Fukushima earthquake and Thai floods. In January 2012 the company paid out a small percentage of the total claims resulting from the Costa Concordia disaster.
