= Andretti Global =

American racecar team

(United States) Andretti Global
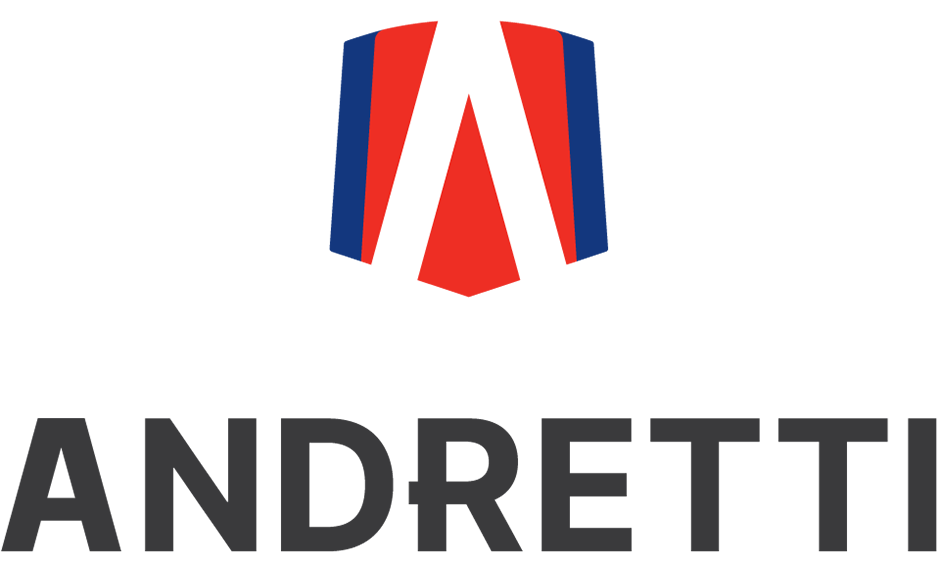
- Owner(s): TWG Motorsports; Michael Andretti
- Principal(s): Dan Towriss (CEO); Rob Edwards (COO); Jill Gregory (president)
- Base: 8278 Georgetown Road Indianapolis, Indiana 46268
- Series: IndyCar Series; Indy NXT; Formula E Supercars Championship; SuperCopa
- Race drivers: IndyCar Series; 26. (Australia) Will Power; 27. (United States) Kyle Kirkwood; 28. (Sweden) Marcus Ericsson; 98. TBA (part-time); Indy NXT; 26. (Australia) Lochie Hughes; 27. (United Kingdom) Sebastian Murray; 28. (United States) Max Taylor; 29. (United States) Josh Pierson; Formula E 27. (United Kingdom) Jake Dennis; 28. (Brazil) Felipe Drugovich; Supercars Championship; 1. (Australia) Chaz Mostert; 2. (New Zealand) Ryan Wood; SuperCopa; 9. (Mexico) Michel Jourdain Jr.
- Opened: 1993
- Website: https://andrettiglobal.com/

Career
- Drivers' Championships: Total: 20; CART: 1; 1995; IndyCar: 4; 2004, 2005, 2007, 2012; Indy Lights: 7; 2008, 2009, 2018, 2019, 2021, 2024, 2025; Indy Pro 2000: 1; 2013; USF2000: 1; 2010; Americas Rallycross: 2; 2018, 2019; Global RallyCross: 3; 2015, 2016, 2017; Formula E: 1; 2022–23
- Indy 500 victories: 6 (1995, 2005, 2007, 2014, 2016, 2017)

Andretti Global is an American motorsports organization with teams competing in the IndyCar Series, Indy NXT, Formula E, and joint entries in IMSA and the Australian Supercars Championship. Since 2026, Andretti Global's parent company TWG Motorsports has also operated the Cadillac Formula One Team in collaboration with General Motors.

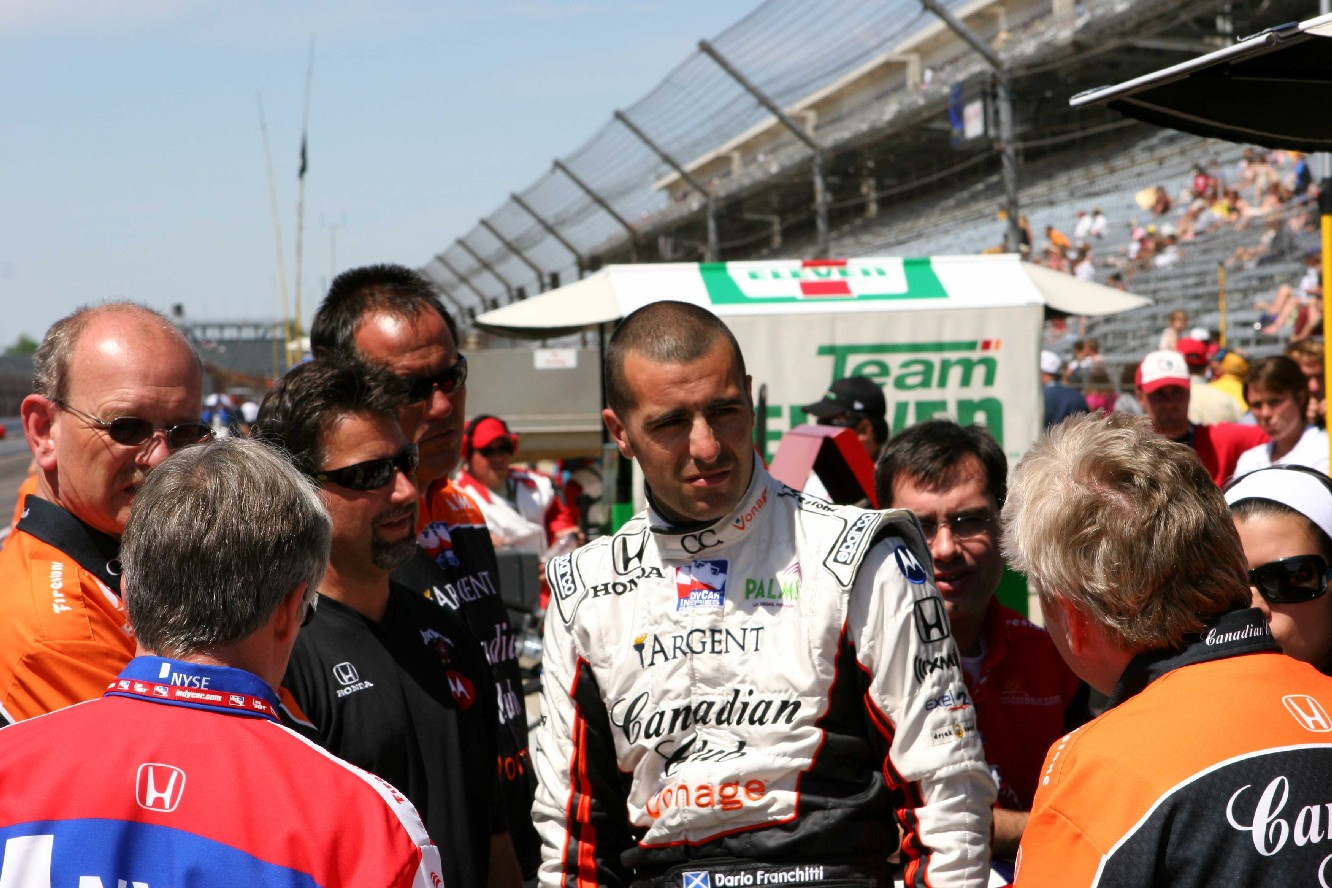
Members of Andretti Green Racing have a meeting on pit road at the Indianapolis Motor Speedway in May 2007.

The team was founded as Forsythe/Green Racing by Gerald Forsythe and Barry Green in 1993, and began competing in the CART Indy Car World Series the following year. Green and his brother Kim took over the team in 1995 and renamed it to Team Green. In 2002, the team was again renamed to Andretti Green Racing after 1991 CART champion Michael Andretti purchased a stake in the team; it began competing in the Indy Racing League in 2003. Andretti acquired full control in 2009 and rebranded the team to Andretti Autosport. The team restructured in September 2023 in pursuit of a Formula One entry and rebranded to Andretti Global, with Dan Towriss becoming a minority owner. In 2024, Andretti sold the team to Los Angeles Dodgers lead owner Mark Walter's TWG Global holding company, with Towriss staying on as co-owner and CEO.

In total, the team has won the Indianapolis 500 six times (1995, 2005, 2007, 2014, 2016, 2017), the CART championship in 1995, and the IndyCar Series championship four times (2004, 2005, 2007, 2012). The team has also won the Indy NXT championship seven times (2008, 2009, 2018, 2019, 2021, 2024, 2025) and the Formula E drivers' championship in 2022–23.

== American open-wheel racing ==
=== CART ===
The team was founded in 1993 by Barry Green and Gerald Forsythe as Forsythe Green Racing. Forsythe had previously competed in the CART series during the early 1980s under the Forsythe Racing banner and had achieved moderate success.

The new team fielded two Atlantics entries with sponsorship from Player's LTD cigarettes for Claude Bourbonnais and Jacques Villeneuve during the 1993 season. In 1994, the team moved up to the CART series with Villeneuve as the driver. The team scored ten top-ten finishes across the sixteen races, including a second place at the 1994 Indianapolis 500 and Villeneuve won one race as a rookie later in the season at Road America. Villeneuve finished sixth in the championship standings with 94 points and was named as Rookie of the Year.

In 1995, Green and Forsythe parted ways, with Barry Green renaming the outfit Team Green. The team would retain their blue and white livery from continued sponsorship from Player's LTD and Barry Green's brother Kim Green would join as team manager. The team won the 1995 Indianapolis 500 and 1995 CART championship with driver Jacques Villeneuve. Villeneuve's title winning year began with taking victory at the season-opening race in Miami before taking further wins at the aforementioned Indianapolis 500, Road America and Cleveland. The title was clinched at the final race at Laguna Seca with 172 points scored across the season, eleven more than defending champion Al Unser Jr in the Penske.

In 1996, the team became known as the Brahma Sports Team for a season after Villeneuve's defection to Formula One, with new driver Raul Boesel. In 1997, Parker Johnstone took over the seat, and KOOL cigarettes came on board as the major sponsor. The team became known as Team KOOL Green, and expanded to a two-car effort in 1998 with Paul Tracy and rising star Dario Franchitti. The two stayed on as teammates for five seasons.

In 2001, Michael Andretti joined the organization as a satellite team headed by Kim Green, known as Team Motorola. In addition to running the CART schedule, Andretti entered the 2001 Indianapolis 500. Andretti and Green competed at Indy for the first time after a five-year absence, due to the ongoing open-wheel "split." Andretti won his last race as a driver at the 2002 Grand Prix of Long Beach. During the 2002 season, the team switched from Reynard to Lola chassis due to the former's financial troubles, producing a striking new livery for Franchitti's car to coincide with the change.

In 2002, both Tracy and Franchitti joined Andretti to race at the Indianapolis 500. Due to the MSA, however, primary sponsor KOOL could not appear on the cars, and associate sponsor 7-Eleven was on the sidepods instead. Tracy placed second in a highly controversial finish. The team protested the results, and a lengthy and contentious appeals process dragged on into the summer. Ultimately, Green lost the appeal, to considerable disappointment and at considerable expense.

=== IndyCar Series ===
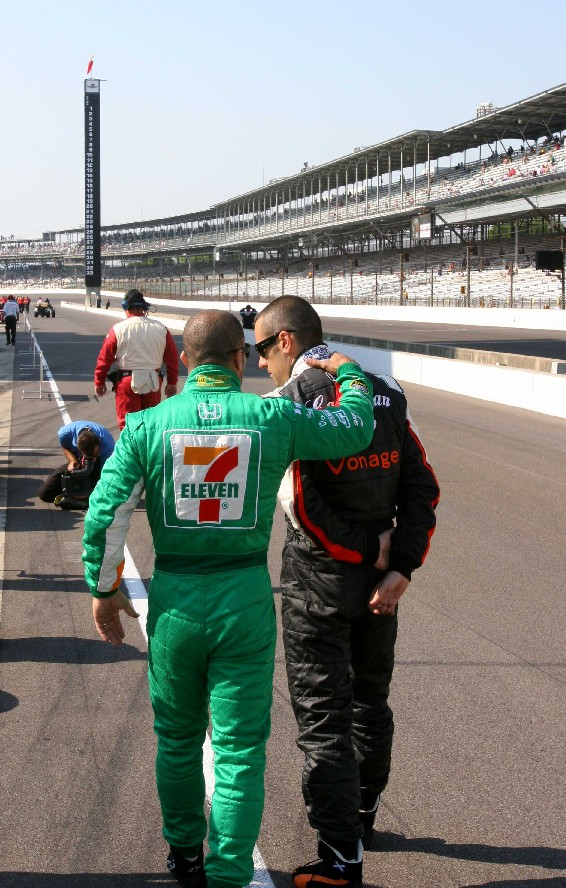
Andretti-Green Racing teammates Tony Kanaan and Dario Franchitti compare notes on Pole Day for the 2007 Indianapolis 500.

After major problems in CART surfaced, Andretti, who had purchased a majority interest in the team, switched the newly renamed Andretti Green Racing in 2003 to the rival Indy Racing League (now the NTT IndyCar Series). Paul Tracy left the team to stay in the Champ Car World Series, with Tony Kanaan joining Dario Franchitti and Andretti. Andretti retired after the 2003 Indianapolis 500, and Dan Wheldon took his place.

AGR ran four cars since the beginning of 2004, with Bryan Herta behind the wheel of the additional car. At the 2005 Grand Prix of St. Petersburg, AGR had all 4 drivers finishing 1st, 2nd, 3rd, and 4th; Wheldon led home Kanaan, Franchitti, and Herta to round out the top 4. Kanaan and Wheldon won consecutive IndyCar Series Championships in 2004 and 2005, with Wheldon winning the 2005 Indianapolis 500. Andretti referred to the win as his very own, as good as if he had won it as a driver, because of the nuances of car ownership and building his team.

Wheldon's championship was his only one before free agency, and joining Target Chip Ganassi Racing in 2006. He was replaced by Michael's son, Marco Andretti. Michael Andretti came out of retirement to qualify for the 2006 Indianapolis 500 to race with his son. The Andrettis finished second and third in "the 500" with Marco being passed just before the finish by Sam Hornish Jr. in the second-closest finish in race history. From 2001 to 2010, the team had seen at least one of their drivers finish within the top three at the race.

It was announced on July 25, 2006, that Danica Patrick would join the team for the 2007 IndyCar Series season to replace Herta, who was being transferred to AGR's new American Le Mans Series Acura LMP2 effort.

In October 2007, after winning the 2007 Indianapolis 500 and 2007 Indy Racing League championship, Franchitti announced his departure from the team to pursue a full-time career in the NASCAR Sprint Cup with Chip Ganassi Racing. Later that month, Hideki Mutoh was announced as his replacement in the 27 car. Mutoh was the runner-up in the 2007 Indy Pro Series season.

The 2008 IndyCar driver lineup returned to the team in 2009. However, for the first time since 2003, the team failed to win a race. Danica Patrick was the team's leading driver finishing 5th in points. Kanaan finished 6th with three podium finishes. The team repeated their Indy Lights championship, this time with American driver J. R. Hildebrand.

On September 25, 2009, the Indianapolis Star reported that Danica Patrick had signed a contract to stay with Andretti Green and the IndyCar Series through 2012.

On November 24, 2009, Andretti Green Racing announced that the team restructuring was complete, and the team would be renamed Andretti Autosport with Michael Andretti as the sole owner.

==== 2010 ====
It was announced on January 4, 2010, that Ryan Hunter-Reay would join the team, replacing Hideki Mutoh. Hunter-Reay earned the team its first victory since 2008 by winning the Grand Prix of Long Beach. Kanaan picked up the team's second win of the season at Iowa. Kanaan and Hunter-Reay led the team in the points standings, finishing 6th and 7th.

During the 2010 season, teammate Tony Kanaan later revealed that he sacrificed part of his salary to help Ryan Hunter-Reay remain with the team after sponsorship funding fell short.

Following the 2010 season, veteran driver Tony Kanaan was released from the team due to the lack of sponsorship. Kanaan later signed with KV Racing Technology. It was announced that the team's other three drivers – Hunter-Reay, Andretti, and Patrick – would return for the 2011 season. Hunter-Reay was signed to a two-year contract through 2012.

==== 2011 ====
The 2011 season marked a return to the victory circle for Andretti Autosport, with Mike Conway winning at Long Beach, Marco Andretti ending a personal 79 race winless drought with his second career win at Iowa, and Ryan Hunter-Reay winning at New Hampshire. Disaster struck at Indianapolis when Mike Conway failed to qualify and Marco Andretti was forced to bump teammate Ryan Hunter-Reay from the final spot in the field, forcing Michael Andretti to purchase the already qualified spot of A. J. Foyt Enterprises driver Bruno Junqueira to meet Hunter-Reay's sponsorship commitments.

In August 2011, Danica Patrick announced her departure from the IndyCar Series to move to NASCAR for the 2012 season; Patrick ran a full-schedule of Nationwide Series events and a limited schedule in the Sprint Cup Series.

At the completion of the 2011 season, Dan Wheldon was due to sign a contract to return to the team in 2012 in the car vacated by Patrick. He was killed in an accident during the season-ending 2011 IZOD IndyCar World Championship, leaving the future of the #7 GoDaddy team uncertain. In January it was announced that 2011 IndyCar rookie of the year James Hinchcliffe would drive the GoDaddy car renumbered to #27.

==== 2012 ====
In 2012, rumors started that Andretti Autosport would expand to NASCAR's Sprint Cup Series competition in 2013. Jayski's Silly Season Site stated that Andretti Autosport would field a single-car team in the Cup Series in 2013 with Dodge as the manufacturer. Two days later, Dodge reported that there was no deal with Andretti or any team for the 2013 Season. In addition to Patrick being replaced by Hinchcliffe, Mike Conway was not brought back for the 2012 season, leaving the team with three full-time cars. Two additional drivers, Sebastián Saavedra and Ana Beatriz were signed for three and two races respectively, including the Indy 500. With Honda no longer the sole engine supplier for the series, a deal was reached with Chevrolet to provide engines for the team. The team's three drivers qualified second, third, and fourth for the 500, however, the race itself proved a disappointment with only Hinchcliffe completing the full 200 laps, finishing sixth. The eighth race of the season at the Milwaukee Mile would be won by Hunter-Reay, his third podium finish of the year. Hunter-Reay would go on to win three races in a row, adding victories at Iowa and Toronto. A fourth victory in the penultimate race of the season at Baltimore left Hunter-Reay as the only challenger to Will Power for the series championship. Power, whose title had seemed inevitable after dominating the road and street courses early in the season, still had a 17-point lead. On lap 66 of the final race of the season at Fontana, with Power and Hunter-Reay racing side by side, Power spun, narrowly missing Hunter-Reay's car, and went hard into the outer wall. Hunter-Reay would finish in fourth to win the championship.

==== 2013 ====
The three main drivers for the team, Andretti, Hunter-Reay, and Hinchcliffe, all returned for 2013. In addition, E. J. Viso was added as a fourth car for the season, in conjunction with HVM Racing. Rookie driver Carlos Muñoz would also drive an entry for the team in the Indy 500. Muñoz and Zach Veach would be the team's drivers in the lower level Indy Lights series. Andretti would also have entries in the Pro Mazda Championship and the U.S. F2000 National Championship, the feeder series to IndyCar (the "Road to Indy"). The season started strong as Hinchcliffe won the season's first race, the Grand Prix of St. Petersburg, his first IndyCar Series victory. In the second race, the Grand Prix of Alabama, Hinchcliffe suffered a breakdown and would be stuck on the side for most of the race watching teammate Hunter-Reay go on to victory to make the team two for two. The streak broke in week three, with both Hinchcliffe and Hunter-Reay exiting the race early. High and low would go on to be a theme for the team that season. Hinchcliffe would go on to win two more races, but a variety of mechanical problems would see him finish the year eighth. Hunter-Reay would have a similar season, winning two races but finishing the season a disappointing seventh following his 2012 championship. Conversely, Andretti would stay near the top of the standings for most of the season after starting by finishing no worse than 7th in seven of his first eight races, but after two early third-place finishes, he would not see the podium the remainder of the year and finished the season in 5th place. Viso, meanwhile who came into the team with a reputation for being involved in collisions, showed flashes of success, including a fourth-place finish at Milwaukee, but had only two top-ten finishes, a fifth and a ninth, in his final eight races, before dropping out of the season finale stating he had food poisoning. He was replaced for the race by Carlos Muñoz. Muñoz provided a thrill for the team in the Indy 500, taking second place in his first-ever start in the IndyCar series.

==== 2014 ====
Andretti, Hunter-Reay, and Hinchcliffe were once again signed as primary drivers and the team once again began running with full-works Honda power, although GoDaddy dropped their IndyCar sponsorship program and was replaced on the Hinchcliffe car by United Fiber & Data. Viso was not brought back, with Muñoz taking over as the driver of the fourth full-time car. In the 2014 Indianapolis 500, the team fielded a fifth car for NASCAR driver Kurt Busch, who attempted Double Duty. Busch and three of the four full-time Andretti Autosport drivers finished the Indianapolis 500 in the top six, including Hunter-Reay, who won the race. (The only exception was Hinchcliffe, who crashed with 25 laps to go while fighting for 2nd position.). However, Busch, who finished in 6th on the lead-lap, fell short of completing all 1,100 miles for Double Duty when his engine expired on lap 274 of the 2014 Coca-Cola 600.

==== 2015 ====
Andretti fielded a three-car full season effort in 2015 with Marco Andretti, Ryan Hunter-Reay, and Carlos Muñoz. Additionally, Simona de Silvestro, Justin Wilson, and Oriol Servia each joined for races throughout the season. Andretti moved from the 25 team to the 27 team, in light of James Hinchcliffe's departure after 2014. Muñoz's team was renumbered from 34 to 26, while the 25 team fielded de Silvestro, Wilson, and Servia. 2015 saw the debut of the 29 team, where it was the 5th Andretti entry at Indianapolis - de Silvestro was the driver. Andretti claimed two podiums, en route to a 9th-place finish in the standings. Hunter-Reay saw a tepid start to 2015, with only 3 top-10 finishes and a best finish of 5th through the first 11 races. However, the 28 team was able to rebound to 6th in the standings after two wins in the final four races. Muñoz claimed his first and only win in IndyCar at Race 1 of the Detroit double-header. However, his worst finish to date at Indianapolis saw him finish 13th in the final standings.

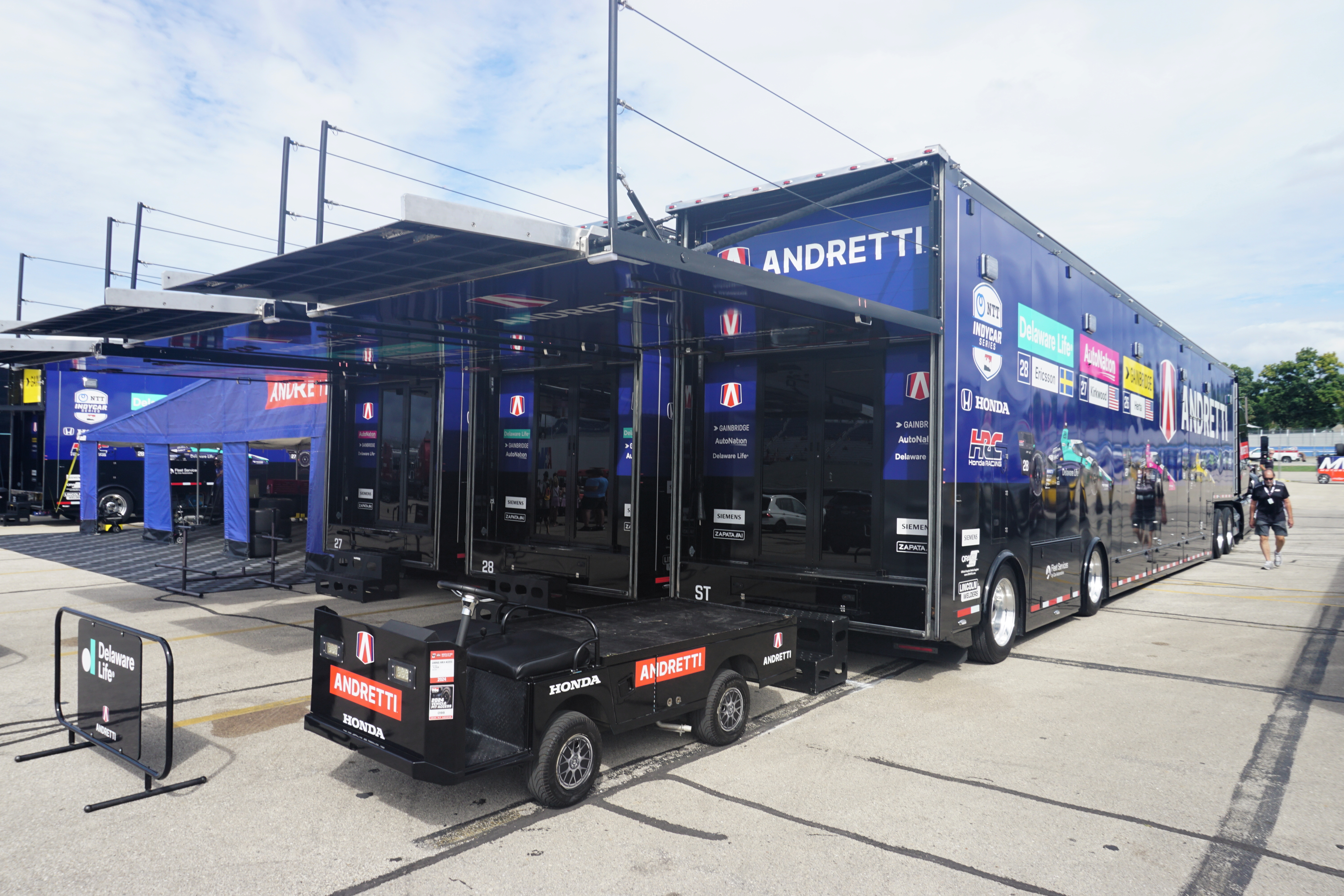
Andretti Global haulers at the 2024 Hy-Vee Milwaukee Mile 250s

==== 2026 ====
For the 2026 season, Colton Herta left IndyCar to become a Cadillac Formula 1 Team tester while running in FIA Formula 2. Andretti hired Will Power was hired to drive the No. 26 entry. Also, Rob Edwards was promoted to Chief Performance Officer of TWG Motorsports, and former Penske engineer Ron Ruzewski took his place as the IndyCar team leader.

Kyle Kirkwood sits third in points after Milwaukee, with two wins at the Indianapolis Grand Prix and at Road America, but 102 points behind Alex Palou. Marcus Ericsson won at Markham and finished second at Gateway, and is placed 8th in points. Power has claimed five podiums, all on road or street courses, and is ranked 11th.

== Other series ==
=== FIA Formula E World Championship ===
==== Andretti Formula E ====
Andretti Formula E is one of the original teams in the FIA Formula E World Championship, having competed in the series since its inaugural season in 2014–15. The American outfit claimed its first Drivers’ Championship in Season 9 (2022–23) with British driver Jake Dennis at the start of the GEN3 era. Dennis continues with the team into Season 12, joined by new teammate Felipe Drugovich.

==== Partnership with BMW ====
Andretti partnered with BMW across three campaigns, with the German manufacturer involved in Formula E from the series' inception until the conclusion of Season 7 (2020–21). Initially providing technical support, BMW officially became a full works team in partnership with Andretti from the 2018–19 season.

During the 2017–18 campaign, BMW supported Andretti with technical assistance, and Antonio Félix da Costa secured the team's best result of the season with a sixth-place finish in the opening race in Hong Kong. Despite a promising start, the team finished last in the Teams' Championship with 24 points.

With BMW becoming a manufacturer team in Season 5 (2018–19), the BMW i Andretti Motorsport team fielded Da Costa and Alexander Sims in the debut of the Gen2 car, the BMW iFE.18. The team achieved a fifth-place finish in the Teams’ Championship during its first season as a full works entry.

For Season 6 (2019–20), Da Costa departed, and Maximilian Günther joined the team alongside the returning Sims. Günther secured victories in Santiago and Berlin, finishing ninth in the Drivers’ Championship, while Sims ended the season in 13th.

==== Rise of Jake Dennis and BMW's Exit ====
In Season 7 (2020–21), Jake Dennis joined the team as a rookie and quickly became a standout performer. He took victories in Valencia and London and entered the final round with a chance to win the title. A technical issue in the season finale ended his hopes, but he finished third overall. It marked BMW's final season in Formula E, concluding the partnership on a competitive note.

Dennis remained with the team for Season 8 (2021–22), joined by American driver Oliver Askew. Dennis continued to deliver strong performances, including a win and second place at the London E-Prix, finishing the season as one of the top drivers.

==== GEN3 Success ====
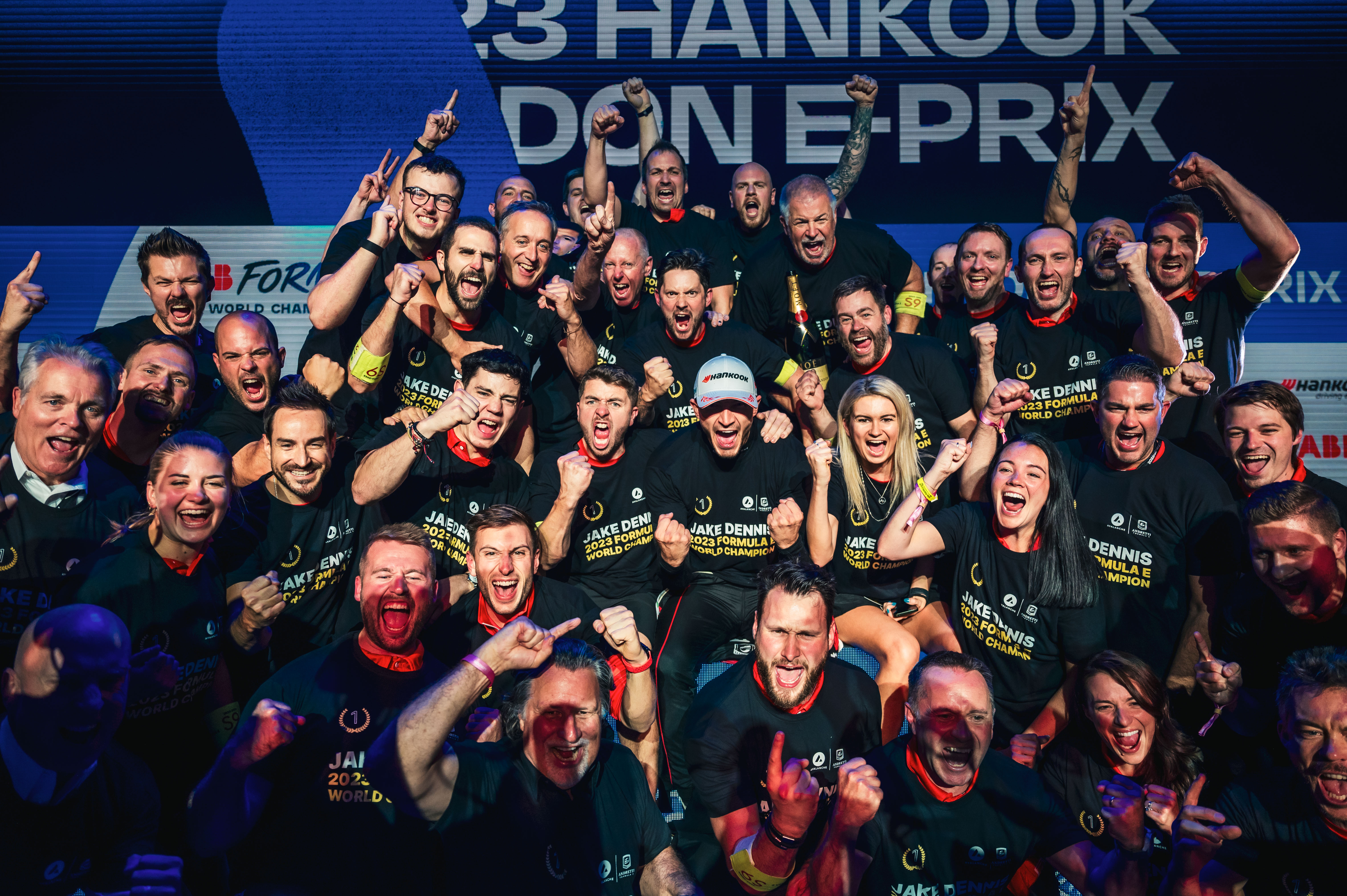
World Champion Jake Dennis, Avalanche Andretti Formula E, celebrates with his team on the podium at the 2023 London E-Prix.

For the start of the GEN3 era in Season 9 (2022–23), Dennis was partnered with experienced German driver André Lotterer. Dennis opened the season with a dominant win in Mexico City and mounted a strong title campaign with a consistent run of podium finishes. He secured the Drivers’ Championship with a record-breaking 11 podiums in 16 races, marking both his and Andretti's first title in Formula E. The occasion was the first time since 1985 in Formula 1 at Brands Hatch that the United Kingdom hosted a deciding race of an FIA-sanctioned single-seater World Championship.

==== Season 10 and Beyond ====
In Season 10 (2023–24), Norman Nato joined Andretti as Dennis's teammate. While Dennis claimed victory in Diriyah and podiums in Tokyo and Misano, the team was unable to consistently challenge the front-runners. Nato's best result came with a third-place finish in Shanghai.

For Season 11 (2024–25), Dennis continues with Andretti for a fifth consecutive season, joined by Swiss driver Nico Müller.

For Season 12 (2025–26), the team retained Dennis for a sixth consecutive season, Müller moved to Porsche and was replaced by 2022 Formula 2 champion Felipe Drugovich. It was announced on May 12 that Andretti would part ways with Porsche as a customer team, instead going with Nissan going into Gen 4.

=== Supercars Championship ===
In 2018, Andretti Autosport entered the Australian Supercars Championship after purchasing a 37.5% shareholding in Walkinshaw Andretti United.

==== Andretti Jourdain Autosport ====
In February 2021, Michael Andretti and former racecar driver Michel Jourdain Jr. announced a joint venture to establish Andretti Jourdain Autosport, a new team based in Mexico competing in the Super Copa Championship's Touring Car division with the No. 1 entry.

The collaboration marked Andretti's expansion into its seventh motorsport discipline, complementing its existing involvement in series such as IndyCar, Indy Lights, IMSA, Formula E, Extreme E, and Supercars Australia. Andretti stated that the venture offered “a great next step in our evolution” and represented “an opportunity…to foster new, diverse racing talent” within Mexico.

=== Former series ===
==== American Le Mans Series ====
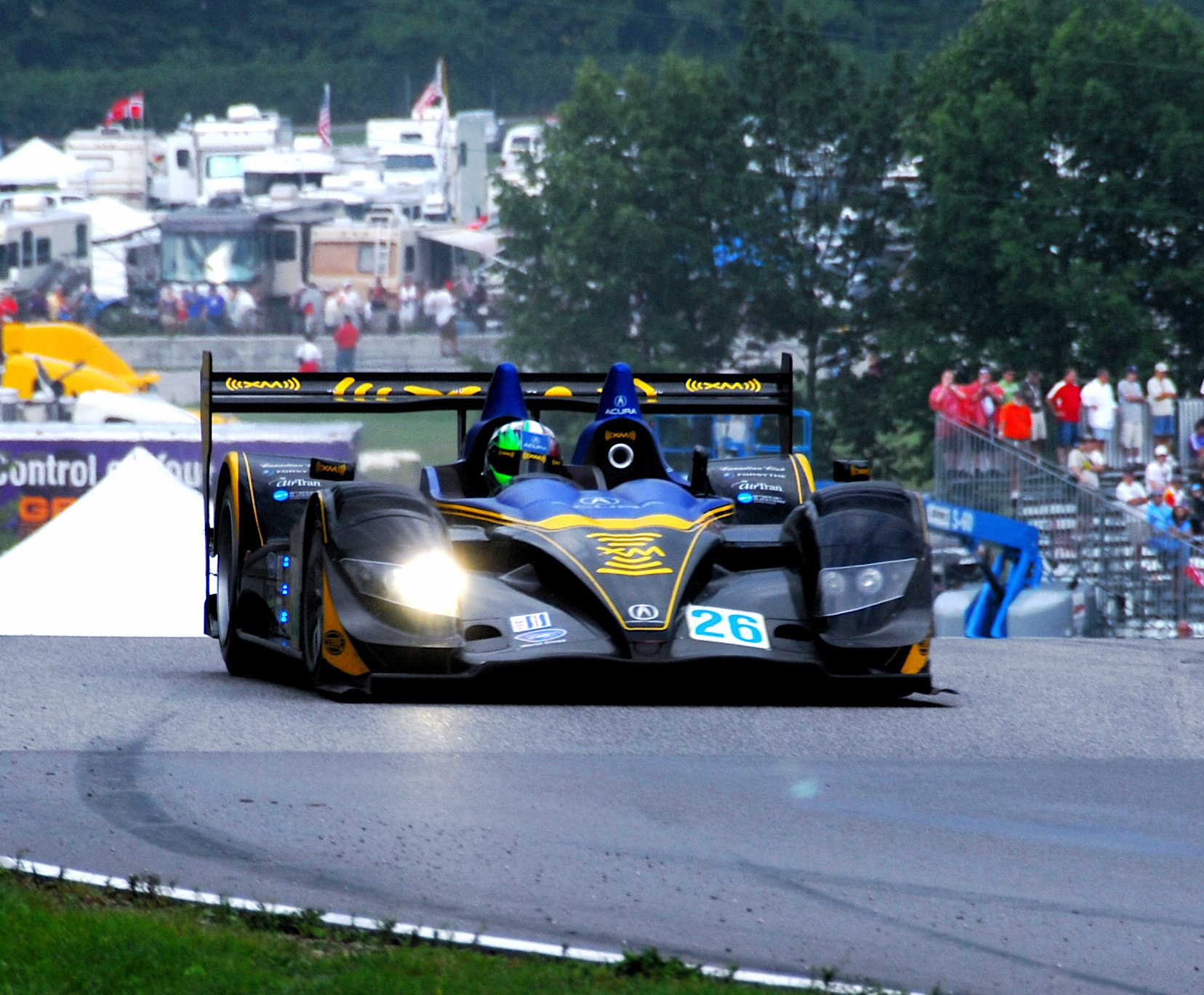
Andretti Green Racing's Acura ARX-01a at Road America

In 2006, it was announced that AGR was selected by Honda Performance Development to be one of the official works teams for the new Acura LMP program in the American Le Mans Series. The team worked with Highcroft Racing on the development of the Courage LC75 chassis. The team debuted the newly renamed Acura ARX-01 at the 2007 12 Hours of Sebring. The AGR team finished second overall, and took the maiden LMP2 win for Acura with drivers Dario Franchitti, Marino Franchitti, Bryan Herta, and Tony Kanaan. However, during the remainder of the season, the Porsche RS Spyders of Penske Racing regularly outpaced the Acuras. The team finished the season 5th in the LMP2 Teams' Championship.

For the 2008 season, the car was driven full-time by Herta and Christian Fittipaldi and occasionally driven by Kanaan at select longer distance events. the 2008 season saw fierce battles between the newly updated Acura ARX-01b, Porsche RS Spyders and the LMP1 Audi R10s. AGR claimed an overall victory at the Detroit race and finished the season with a class victory in the final race at Mazda Raceway Laguna Seca. The team finished the season 4th in the Teams' Championship.

Acura discontinued its relationship with the team for the 2009 season due to mixed results. The team did not compete in 2009.

==== U.S. F2000 National Championship ====
Andretti Autosport announced on March 4, 2010, that they would begin competing in the U.S. F2000 National Championship when they signed Sage Karam. The team was looking for a teammate for Karam and announced on March 26, 2010, that they had signed Zach Veach to join him. The two have been very active on and off the racetrack. Karam won the 2010 points championship, Veach had 10 top-five finishes despite missing two events and the team secured the team championship for the 2010 season. Off the track, Karam has spoken at Operation Smile and Veach is working with Oprah Winfrey's No Phone Zone and FocusDriven as a spokesKID for both.

Spencer Pigot replaced the departing Sage Karam for the 2011 season. Pigot finished second in standings, while teammate Veach finished fourth.

==== Extreme E ====
In April 2020, Extreme E announced that Andretti Autosport became the sixth team to join the series. Andretti Autosport would partner with United Autosport and the team entered the inaugural season as Andretti United Extreme E with Catie Munnings and Timmy Hansen signed as drivers for the team. The team won its first race in the Arctic X-Prix and finished the first season in fourth place.

In December 2021, the team announced a title sponsorship deal with American software company Genesys and entered the 2022 season as Genesys Andretti United Extreme E. The team also announced that they have retained Munnings and Hansen. The team finished the second season in fifth place.

In February 2023, the team announced a title sponsorship deal with Saudi Arabia automotive company Altawkilat and will enter the 2023 season as Andretti Altawkilat Extreme E. Despite being dropped from the new identity, United Autosport will continue to hold an equity stake in the team. The team retained Munnings and Hansen for the third season in a row, with the pair signing a multiyear extension deal with the team in November 2022. The team finished the season in seventh place.

The team entered the 2024 season with Munnings and Hansen. On September 6, a week before the scheduled Island X-Prix, Extreme E announced the cancellation of the remaining rounds in Sardinia and Phoenix.

== Formula One ==
At the end of 2021, media outlets reported that Andretti Autosport was negotiating to buy Formula One constructors Sauber or Haas, but the negotiations proved unsuccessful. Mario Andretti had previously won the 1978 Formula One World Drivers' Championship with Team Lotus.

Andretti Autosport rebranded as Andretti Global in contemplation of adding a Formula One team. In 2022, Michael Andretti filed an application with the FIA, Formula One's governing body, to enter in 2024, and struck a deal to acquire engines from Renault. However, the FIA stated that it was not seeking to increase the number of teams on the Formula One grid and some team officials, including CEO of Mercedes F1, Toto Wolff, and team principal of Alfa Romeo, Frédéric Vasseur, were against Andretti's entry, saying that Formula One needed big car manufacturers to add value, like Audi. Red Bull Racing team principal Christian Horner stressed that the problem was the distribution of profits, while owner of Aston Martin, Lawrence Stroll, was in favor of the incorporation of Andretti to Formula One, although he would later be against it. In another interview, McLaren's CEO Zak Brown showed his support for Andretti, saying other teams that were against Andretti's entry were being short-sighted.

In 2023, Michael Andretti announced that he had established a partnership with General Motors and that his Formula One bid would be branded under GM's Cadillac marque. He added that F1 teams McLaren and Renault/Alpine had agreed to support the bid. However, the announcement did not specify whether Cadillac would produce its own power unit or rebadge an existing manufacturer's unit. The move was approved by the FIA but declined by the Formula One Group, which said that it would prefer a team "with a GM power unit, either as a GM works team or as a GM customer team". FIA president Mohammed Ben Sulayem was surprised at the 'adverse reaction'.

Following the Andretti family's sale of the team to Los Angeles Dodgers lead owner and Chelsea F.C. co-owner Mark Walter's holding company TWG Global, as well as confirmation from GM that it would enter as an engine supplier at a later date, the FIA approved the Andretti-GM bid to enter Formula One in 2026. The team hired Graeme Lowdon as team principal and arranged for Ferrari to supply engines on a temporary basis.

== Drivers ==
=== CART (1994–2002) ===
- (Canada) Jacques Villeneuve (1994–1995)
- (Brazil) Raul Boesel (1996)
- (United States) Parker Johnstone (1997)
- (United Kingdom) Dario Franchitti (1998–2002)
- (Canada) Paul Tracy (1998–2002)
- (United States) Michael Andretti (2001–2002)

=== IRL / IndyCar Series (2001–present) ===
- (United States) Michael Andretti (2001–2003, 2006–07)
- (United Kingdom) Dario Franchitti (2002–2007)
- (Canada) Paul Tracy (2002)
- (Brazil) Tony Kanaan (2003–2010)
- (United States) Robby Gordon (2003)
- (United States) Bryan Herta (2003–2006)
- (United Kingdom) Dan Wheldon (2003–2005, 2012†)
- (United States) A. J. Foyt IV (2006)
- (United States) Marco Andretti (2006–2025)
- (United States) Danica Patrick (2007–2011)
- (Japan) Hideki Mutoh (2008–2009)
- (France) Franck Montagny (2009)
- (United States) Ryan Hunter-Reay (2010–2021)
- (United Kingdom) Adam Carroll (2010)
- (United States) John Andretti (2010–2011)
- (United Kingdom) Mike Conway (2011)
- (Canada) James Hinchcliffe (2012–2014, 2020–2021)
- (Colombia) Sebastián Saavedra (2012)
- (Brazil) Ana Beatriz (2012)
- (Venezuela) E. J. Viso (2013)
- (Colombia) Carlos Muñoz (2013–2016)
- (United States) Kurt Busch (2014)
- (Switzerland) Simona de Silvestro (2015)
- (United Kingdom) Justin Wilson (2015)
- (Spain) Oriol Servià (2015)
- (United States) Alexander Rossi (2016–2022)
- (United States) Townsend Bell (2016)
- (Japan) Takuma Sato (2017)
- (Spain) Fernando Alonso (2017)
- (United Kingdom) Jack Harvey (2017)
- (United States) Zach Veach (2018–2020)
- (United States) Colton Herta (2020–2025)
- (France) Romain Grosjean (2022–2023)
- (Canada) Devlin DeFrancesco (2022–2023)
- (United States) Kyle Kirkwood (2023–present)
- (Sweden) Marcus Ericsson (2024–present)
- (Australia) Will Power (2026–present)

† - Wheldon was signed to drive for Andretti in 2012, but was killed in a crash in the 2011 IndyCar season finale. Andretti chose James Hinchcliffe to drive in place of Wheldon.

=== Indy NXT / Indy Lights (1996–2000, 2005–present) ===
- (United States) Chris Simmons (1996–1997)
- (United States) Greg Ray (1996)
- (United States) Mark Hotchkis (1997)
- (Japan) Naoki Hattori (1997–1998)
- (United Kingdom) Jonny Kane (1999–2000)
- (United States) Jeff Simmons (2000)
- (United States) Marco Andretti (2005)
- (United States) Jonathan Klein (2006)
- (Brazil) Jaime Camara (2006–2007)
- (New Zealand) Wade Cunningham (2007)
- (Netherlands) Arie Luyendyk Jr. (2008)
- (Brazil) Raphael Matos (2008)
- (United States) J. R. Hildebrand (2009)
- (United States) Charlie Kimball (2010)
- (United Kingdom) Martin Plowman (2010)
- (United Kingdom) Stefan Wilson (2011)
- (United Kingdom) James Winslow (2011)
- (Republic of Ireland) Peter Dempsey (2011)
- (Colombia) Sebastián Saavedra (2009, 2012)
- (Colombia) Carlos Muñoz (2012–2013)
- (United States) Sage Karam (2013)
- (United States) Zach Veach (2013–2014)
- (Australia) Matthew Brabham (2014–2015, 2022)
- (United States) Shelby Blackstock (2015–2016)
- (Canada) Dalton Kellett (2016–2018)
- (United Kingdom) Dean Stoneman (2016)
- (United States) Colton Herta (2017–2018)
- (United States) Ryan Norman (2017–2019)
- (France) Nico Jamin (2017)
- (Mexico) Patricio O'Ward (2018)
- (United States) Jarett Andretti (2019)
- (United States) Oliver Askew (2019)
- (United States) Robert Megennis (2019–2021)
- (Canada) Devlin DeFrancesco (2021)
- (Singapore) Danial Frost (2021)
- (United States) Kyle Kirkwood (2021)
- (United States) Sting Ray Robb (2022)
- (Denmark) Christian Rasmussen (2022)
- (New Zealand) Hunter McElrea (2022–2023)
- (United Kingdom) Louis Foster (2023–2024)
- (United Kingdom) Jamie Chadwick (2023–2024)
- (Republic of Ireland) James Roe Jr. (2023–2025)
- (Norway) Dennis Hauger (2024–2025)
- (Australia) Lochie Hughes (2025–present)
- (Mexico) Salvador de Alba (2025)
- (United Kingdom) Sebastian Murray (2026)

=== ALMS (2007–2008) ===
- (United Kingdom) Dario Franchitti (2007)
- (United Kingdom) Marino Franchitti (2007)
- (United States) Bryan Herta (2007–2008)
- (Brazil) Tony Kanaan (2007–2008)
- (Brazil) Christian Fittipaldi (2008)
- (United States) Marco Andretti (2008)
- (France) Franck Montagny (2008)
- (United Kingdom) James Rossiter (2008)
- (Brazil) Raphael Matos (2008)

=== A1GP (2008–2009) ===
- (United States) Charlie Kimball (2008)
- (United States) Marco Andretti (2008–2009)
- (United Kingdom) Adam Carroll (2008–2009)
- (United States) J. R. Hildebrand (2008–2009)

=== Star Mazda Championship / Pro Mazda Championship / Indy Pro 2000 Championship (2011–2015, 2020) ===
- (United States) Sage Karam (2011–2012)
- (United States) Zach Veach (2011–2012)
- (United States) Shelby Blackstock (2013–2014)
- (Australia) Matthew Brabham (2013)
- (Canada) Garett Grist (2014)
- (Malaysia) Weiron Tan (2015)
- (Canada) Dalton Kellett (2015)
- (Canada) Devlin DeFrancesco (2020)

=== USF2000 (2010–2013) ===
- (United States) Sage Karam (2010)
- (United States) Zach Veach (2010–2011)
- (United States) Spencer Pigot (2011)
- (Canada) Thomas McGregor (2012)
- (United States) Shelby Blackstock (2012)
- (United States) Austin Cindric (2013)
- (United States) Luca Forgeois (2013)
- (Canada) Garett Grist (2013)

=== Red Bull Global RallyCross (2014–2018) ===
- (United States) Tanner Foust (2014–2018)
- (United States) Scott Speed (2014–2018)

=== Formula E (2014–present) ===
- (France) Franck Montagny (2014)
- (France) Charles Pic (2014)
- (United States) Matthew Brabham (2014)
- (France) Jean-Éric Vergne (2014–2015)
- (United States) Marco Andretti (2015)
- (United States) Scott Speed (2015)
- (United Kingdom) Justin Wilson (2015)
- (Switzerland) Simona de Silvestro (2015–2016)
- (Netherlands) Robin Frijns (2015–2017)
- (Portugal) António Félix da Costa (2016–2019)
- (United Kingdom) Alexander Sims (2017–2020)
- (Japan) Kamui Kobayashi (2017)
- (United Kingdom) Tom Blomqvist (2018)
- (France) Stéphane Sarrazin (2018)
- (Germany) Maximilian Günther (2019–2021)
- (United Kingdom) Jake Dennis (2021–present)
- (United States) Oliver Askew (2022)
- (Germany) André Lotterer (2023)
- (Germany) David Beckmann (2023)
- (France) Norman Nato (2024)
- (Switzerland) Nico Müller (2024–2025)
- (Brazil) Felipe Drugovich (2025–present)

=== Americas Rallycross (2018–2019) ===
- (United States) Scott Speed (2018)
- (United States) Cabot Bigham (2019)
- (United States) Tanner Foust (2018–2019)

=== Formula Regional Americas (2020) ===
- (Singapore) Danial Frost (2020)

=== Extreme E (2021–2024) ===
- (United Kingdom) Catie Munnings
- (Sweden) Timmy Hansen

=== IMSA (2021–present) ===
- (United States) Jarett Andretti (2021–present)
- (United States) Marco Andretti (2021)
- (United States) Oliver Askew (2021)
- (Australia) Josh Burdon (2021–2022)
- (Colombia) Gabby Chaves (2022–present)
- (Sweden) Rasmus Lindh (2022–present)
- (United States) Dakota Dickerson (2023–present)
- (Portugal) Filipe Albuquerque (2023–present)
- (United States) Ricky Taylor (2023–present)
- (Switzerland) Louis Deletraz (2023–present)
- (New Zealand) Brendon Hartley (2023–present)

== Driver development program ==
As of January 2025, the following drivers are members of Andretti Global's Driver Development Program:

Driver	Years	Current Series	Titles as Andretti Junior
(United States) Sebastian Wheldon	2023–	Italian F4 Championship; Euro 4 Championship	Skip Barber Formula Race Series (2023)
(United States) Oliver Wheldon	2023–	USF Juniors	Skip Barber Formula Race Series (2024)
(United States) (Jamaica) Zayne Burgess	2025–	Karting	Italian Karting Championship Mini Gr3 U10 (2026)

== Racing results ==
=== Indy Car World Series/CART (as Team Green) ===
(key)

Indy Car World Series/CART results
Year	Chassis	Engine	Tyres	Drivers	No.	1	2	3	4	5	6	7	8	9	10	11	12	13	14	15	16	17	18	19	20	21	Pts Pos	Pos
1994						SFR	PHX	LBH	INDY	MIL	DET	POR	CLE	TOR	MCH	MOH	NHA	VAN	ROA	NAZ	LAG							
1994	Reynard 94i	Ford XB V8 t	G	(Canada) Jacques Villeneuve (R)	12	17	25	15	2	9	7	6	4	9	20	9	26	24	1	7	3						6th	94
1995						MIA	SFR	PHX	LBH	NAZ	INDY	MIL	DET	POR	ROA	TOR	CLE	MCH	MOH	NHA	VAN	LAG						
1995	Reynard 95i	Ford XB V8 t	G	(Canada) Jacques Villeneuve	27	1	20	5	25	2*	1	6	9	20	1*	3	1	10	3	4	12	11					1st	172
1996						MIA	RIO	SFR	LBH	NAZ	500	MIL	DET	POR	CLE	TOR	MCH	MOH	ROA	VAN	LAG							
1996	Reynard 96i	Ford XD V8 t	G	(Brazil) Raul Boesel	1	14	7	13	16	21	24	26	8	28	26	24	7	22	14	23	20						22nd	17
1997						MIA	SFR	LBH	NAZ	RIO	GAT	MIL	DET	POR	CLE	TOR	MCH	MOH	ROA	VAN	LAG	FON						
1997	Reynard 97i	Honda HRR V8 t	F	(United States) Parker Johnstone	27	8	21	5	17	12	7	25	20	9	10	12	25	12	23	11	12	11					16th	36
1998						MIA	MOT	LBH	NAZ	RIO	GAT	MIL	DET	POR	CLE	TOR	MCH	MOH	ROA	VAN	LAG	HOU	SFR	FON				
1998	Reynard 98i	Honda HRK V8 t	F	(Canada) Paul Tracy	26	27	5	25	5	25	26	7	7	28	19	14	9	5	6	11	8	20	23	14			13th	61
1998	Reynard 98i	Honda HRK V8 t	F	(United Kingdom) Dario Franchitti	27	9	8	2	21	19	27	4	4	21	3	20*	21	26	1*	1*	4	1*	2	22			3rd	160
1999						MIA	MOT	LBH	NAZ	RIO	GAT	MIL	POR	CLE	ROA	TOR	MCH	DET	MOH	CHI	VAN	LAG	HOU	SRF	FON			
1999	Reynard 99i	Honda HRS V8 t	F	(Brazil) Raul Boesel	26	27																					32nd	1
1999	Reynard 99i	Honda HRS V8 t	F	(Canada) Paul Tracy	26		11	21	3	15	19	1	5	4	11	2	3	2	2	23	18	4	1*	7	18		3rd	161
1999	Reynard 99i	Honda HRS V8 t	F	(United Kingdom) Dario Franchitti	27	3	22	2	8	2	3	7	3	25	18	1*	5	1	3*	2	10	25	2	1*	10		2nd	212
2000						MIA	LBH	RIO	MOT	NAZ	MIL	DET	POR	CLE	TOR	MCH	CHI	MOH	ROA	VAN	LAG	GAT	HOU	SRF	FON			
2000	Reynard 2Ki	Honda HR-0 V8 t	F	(Canada) Paul Tracy	26	3	1	3	6	10	15	20	18	19	3	7	19	16	1	1	11	18	4	17	24		5th	134
2000	Reynard 2Ki	Honda HR-0 V8 t	F	(United Kingdom) Dario Franchitti	27	11	23	11	2	23	6	4	9	13	25	3	20	22	12	2*	3	24	25	25	23		13th	92
2001						MTY	LBH	TEX	NAZ	MOT	MIL	DET	POR	CLE	TOR	MCH	CHI	MOH	ROA	VAN	LAU	ROC	HOU	LAG	SRF	FON		
2001	Reynard 01i	Honda HR-1 V8 t	F	(Canada) Paul Tracy	26	3	4	C^{1}	3	18	24	14	21	24	6	7	12	4	26	26	10	6	24	18	14	24	14th	73
2001	Reynard 01i	Honda HR-1 V8 t	F	(United Kingdom) Dario Franchitti	27	9	6	C^{1}	8	17	9	2	6	1	24	2	15	16	19	9	25	9	2	19	23	23	7th	105
2001	Reynard 01i	Honda HR-1 V8 t	F	(United States) Michael Andretti	39	4	28	C^{1}	6	23	2	4	8	15	1	19	24	26	2	3	4	5	21	14	2	7	3rd	147
2002						MTY	LBH	MOT	MIL	LAG	POR	CHI	TOR	CLE	VAN	MOH	ROA	MTL	DEN	ROC	MIA	SFR	FON	MEX				
2002	Reynard 02i Lola B02/00	Honda HR-2 V8 t	B	(Canada) Paul Tracy	26	8	7	19	1*	17	17	9	16	3	2*	18	13*	4	8	19	12	3	17	16			11th	101
2002	Reynard 02i Lola B02/00	Honda HR-2 V8 t	B	(United Kingdom) Dario Franchitti	27	2	9	3	12	19	3	3	13	14	1	17	12	1*	18	1	10	7	10	5			4th	148
2002	Reynard 02i Lola B02/00	Honda HR-2 V8 t	B	(United States) Michael Andretti	39	12	1*	16	7	11	9	15	11	2	6	3	10	8	13	10	8	9	2	17			9th	110

1. The Firestone Firehawk 600 was canceled after qualifying due to excessive g-forces on the drivers.

=== Indy Racing League/IndyCar Series ===
(key)

IndyCar Series results
Year	Chassis	Engine	Drivers	No.	1	2	3	4	5	6	7	8	9	10	11	12	13	14	15	16	17	18	19	Pos	Pos
2001					PHX	HMS	ATL	INDY	TXS	PPIR	RIR	KAN	NSH	KTY	GAT	CHI	TXS								
2001	Dallara IR-01	Oldsmobile Aurora V8	(United States) Michael Andretti	39				3																34th	35
2002					HMS	PHX	FON	NAZ	INDY	TXS	PPIR	RIR	KAN	NSH	MCH	KTY	GAT	CHI	TXS						
2002	Dallara IR-02	Chevrolet Indy V8	(Canada) Paul Tracy	26					2															34th	40
2002	Dallara IR-02	Chevrolet Indy V8	(United Kingdom) Dario Franchitti	27					19															44th	11
2002	Dallara IR-02	Chevrolet Indy V8	(United States) Michael Andretti	39					7															38th	26
2003					HMS	PHX	MOT	INDY	TXS	PPIR	RIR	KAN	NSH	MCH	GAT	KTY	NAZ	CHI	FON	TXS					
2003	Dallara IR-03	Honda HI3R V8	(Brazil) Tony Kanaan	11	4	1*	14*	3	2	2	5	4	9*	16	2	6	18	6	3	14				4th	476
2003	Dallara IR-03	Honda HI3R V8	(United States) Michael Andretti	7	6	13	4	27																24th	80
2003	Dallara IR-03	Honda HI3R V8	(United Kingdom) Dan Wheldon	7																3				11th	312
2003	Dallara IR-03	Honda HI3R V8	(United Kingdom) Dan Wheldon	26				19	20	19	8	21	4	20	5	8	7	4	4					11th	312
2003	Dallara IR-03	Honda HI3R V8	(United Kingdom) Dan Wheldon	27			7																	11th	312
2003	Dallara IR-03	Honda HI3R V8	(United Kingdom) Dario Franchitti	27	7	16				4														25th	72
2003	Dallara IR-03	Honda HI3R V8	(United States) Bryan Herta	27					5		14	1	12	19	21	3	3	3	22	5				13th	277
2003	Dallara IR-03	Honda HI3R V8	(United States) Robby Gordon	27				22																33rd	8
2004					HMS	PHX	MOT	INDY	TXS	RIR	KAN	NSH	MIL	MCH	KTY	PPIR	NAZ	CHI	FON	TXS					
2004	Dallara IR-04	Honda HI4R V8	(United States) Bryan Herta	7	13	7	14	4	19	4	5	18	9	6	9	9	8	2	17	16				9th	362
2004	Dallara IR-04	Honda HI4R V8	(Brazil) Tony Kanaan	11	8	1*	2	2	1*	5	3	1	4	2*	5*	5	2	3	2	2				1st	618
2004	Dallara IR-04	Honda HI4R V8	(United Kingdom) Dan Wheldon	26	3	3	1*	3	13	1	9	13	18	3	3	3	1	4	3	3				2nd	533
2004	Dallara IR-04	Honda HI4R V8	(United Kingdom) Dario Franchitti	27	17	17	7	14	2	12*	4	20	1*	22	6	1*	3	20	6	15				6th	409
2005					HMS	PHX	STP	MOT	INDY	TXS	RIR	KAN	NSH	MIL	MCH	KTY	PPIR	SNM	CHI	WGL	FON				
2005	Dallara IR-05	Honda HI5R V8	(United States) Bryan Herta	7	14	7	4	5	3	10	8	15	22	6	1*	19	12	13	14	8	11			8th	397
2005	Dallara IR-05	Honda HI5R V8	(Brazil) Tony Kanaan	11	3	3	2	6	8	3	19	1	19*	4	4	20	3	1*	5	2	2			2nd	548
2005	Dallara IR-05	Honda HI5R V8	(United Kingdom) Dan Wheldon	26	1*	6*	1	1	1	6	5	2*	21	5	2	3*	1	18	1*	5	6			1st	628
2005	Dallara IR-05	Honda HI5R V8	(United Kingdom) Dario Franchitti	27	22	4	3	17*	6	8	2	4	1	2	8	18	7	8	12	3	1			4th	498
2006					HMS	STP	MOT	INDY	WGL	TXS	RIR	KAN	NSH	MIL	MCH	KTY	SNM	CHI							
2006	Dallara IR-05	Honda HI6R V8	(United States) Michael Andretti	1				3																24th	35
2006	Dallara IR-05	Honda HI6R V8	(United States) Bryan Herta	7	13	4	6	20	13	11	6	13	11	7	11	10	10	15						11th	289
2006	Dallara IR-05	Honda HI6R V8	(Brazil) Tony Kanaan	11	11	3	3	5	11	7	18	5	12	1*	4	5	11	7						6th	384
2006	Dallara IR-05	Honda HI6R V8	(United States) Marco Andretti (R)	26	15	15	12	2	16	14	4	9	8	5	8	17	1	18						7th	325
2006	Dallara IR-05	Honda HI6R V8	(United Kingdom) Dario Franchitti	27	4	19	11	7	14	13	3	12	6	6	12	9	2							8th	311
2006	Dallara IR-05	Honda HI6R V8	(United States) A. J. Foyt IV	27														14						26th	16
2007					HMS	STP	MOT	KAN	INDY	MIL	TXS	IOW	RIR	WGL	NSH	MOH	MCH	KTY	SNM	DET	CHI				
2007	Dallara IR-05	Honda HI7R V8	(United States) Danica Patrick	7	14	8	11	7	8	8	3	13	6	11	3	5	7	16	6	2	11			7th	424
2007	Dallara IR-05	Honda HI7R V8	(Brazil) Tony Kanaan	11	5	3	1	15	12*	1	2	16	4	4	18	4	1	1*	4	1	6			3rd	576
2007	Dallara IR-05	Honda HI7R V8	(United States) Marco Andretti	26	20	4	16	19	24	15	19	2	12	5	5	18	2	4	16	17	22			11th	350
2007	Dallara IR-05	Honda HI7R V8	(United Kingdom) Dario Franchitti	27	7	5	3	2	1	2	4	1*	1*	3	2	2	13*	8	3*	6*	1			1st	637
2007	Dallara IR-05	Honda HI7R V8	(United States) Michael Andretti	39					13															27th	17
2008					HMS	STP	MOT	LBH	KAN	INDY	MIL	TXS	IOW	RIR	WGL	NSH	MOH	EDM	KTY	SNM	DET	CHI	SRF^{1}		
2008	Dallara IR-05	Honda HI7R V8	(United States) Danica Patrick	7	6	10	1		19	22	9	10	6	6	14	5	12	18	11	5	16	10	18	6th	379
2008	Dallara IR-05	Honda HI7R V8	(Brazil) Tony Kanaan	11	8	3	5		2	29	3	5	18	1*	3	4*	7	9	8	3	3	4	21	3rd	513
2008	Dallara IR-05	Honda HI7R V8	(United States) Marco Andretti	26	2*	25	18		5	3	21	19	3	9	5	24	25	17	3	14	18	8	13	7th	363
2008	Dallara IR-05	Honda HI7R V8	(Japan) Hideki Mutoh (R)	27	24	6	11		6	7	12	6	2	13	9	14	9	27	18	13	11	22	8	10th	346
2009					STP	LBH	KAN	INDY	MIL	TXS	IOW	RIR	WGL	TOR	EDM	KTY	MOH	SNM	CHI	MOT	HMS				
2009	Dallara IR-05	Honda HI7R V8	(United States) Danica Patrick	7	19	4	5	3	5	6	9	5	11	6	11	8	19	16	12	6	19			5th	393
2009	Dallara IR-05	Honda HI7R V8	(Brazil) Tony Kanaan	11	5	3	3	27	19	8	14	6	8	17	21	3	10	8	13	11	4			6th	386
2009	Dallara IR-05	Honda HI7R V8	(France) Franck Montagny (R)	25														20						38th	12
2009	Dallara IR-05	Honda HI7R V8	(United States) Marco Andretti	26	13	6	6	30	7	4	12	7	5	8	10	10	6	14	11	7	22			8th	380
2009	Dallara IR-05	Honda HI7R V8	(Japan) Hideki Mutoh	27	15	20	8	10	8	21	3	4	18	12	14	13	5	5	23	14	6			11th	353
2010					SAO	STP	ALA	LBH	KAN	INDY	TXS	IOW	WGL	TOR	EDM	MOH	SNM	CHI	KTY	MOT	HMS				
2010	Dallara IR-05	Honda HI7R V8	(United States) Danica Patrick	7	15	7	19	16	11	6	2	10	20	6	15	21	16	14	9	5	2			10th	367
2010	Dallara IR-05	Honda HI7R V8	(Brazil) Tony Kanaan	11	10	10	8	5	3	11	6	1	21	4	12	17	7	5	4	7	3			6th	453
2010	Dallara IR-05	Honda HI7R V8	(United States) Marco Andretti	26	23	12	5*	14	13	3	3	15	13	8	11	9	12	3	6	11	7			8th	392
2010	Dallara IR-05	Honda HI7R V8	(United Kingdom) Adam Carroll (R)	27									16			19								34th	26
2010	Dallara IR-05	Honda HI7R V8	(United States) Ryan Hunter-Reay	37	2	11	12	1*	5	18	7	8	7	3	5	10	8	4	21	9	11			7th	445
2010	Dallara IR-05	Honda HI7R V8	(United States) John Andretti	43					9	30														32nd	35
2011					STP	ALA	LBH	SAO	INDY	TXS		MIL	IOW	TOR	EDM	MOH	NHM	SNM	BAL	MOT	KTY	LSV			
2011	Dallara IR-05	Honda HI7R V8	(United States) Danica Patrick	7	12	17	7	23	10	16	8	5	10	19	9	21	6	21	6	11	10	C^{2}		10th	314
2011	Dallara IR-05	Honda HI7R V8	(United States) Marco Andretti	26	24	4	26	14	9	13	6	13	1	4	14	7	24	24	25	3	27	C^{2}		8th	337
2011	Dallara IR-05	Honda HI7R V8	(United Kingdom) Mike Conway	27	23	22	1	6	DNQ	24	17	12	24	22	8	26	25	16	23	9	18	C^{2}		17th	260
2011	Dallara IR-05	Honda HI7R V8	(United States) Ryan Hunter-Reay	28	21	14	23	18	DNQ	19	9	26	8	3	7	3	1	10	8	24	5	C^{2}		7th	347
2011	Dallara IR-05	Honda HI7R V8	(United States) John Andretti	43					22															42nd	16
2012					STP	ALA	LBH	SAO	INDY	DET	TEX	MIL	IOW	TOR	EDM	MOH	SNM	BAL	FON						
2012	Dallara DW12	Chevrolet IndyCar V6 t	(Colombia) Sebastián Saavedra^{3}	17					26								15		21					27th	41
2012	Dallara DW12	Chevrolet IndyCar V6 t	(Brazil) Ana Beatriz^{4}	25				20	23															29th	28
2012	Dallara DW12	Chevrolet IndyCar V6 t	(United States) Marco Andretti	26	14	11	25	14	24*	11	17	15	2	16	14	8	25	14	8					16th	278
2012	Dallara DW12	Chevrolet IndyCar V6 t	(Canada) James Hinchcliffe	27	4	6	3	6	6	21	4	3	17	22	12	5	26	15	13					8th	353
2012	Dallara DW12	Chevrolet IndyCar V6 t	(United States) Ryan Hunter-Reay	28	3	12	6	2	27	7	21	1*	1	1*	7	24	18	1	4					1st	468
2013					STP	ALA	LBH	SAO	INDY	DET		TXS	MIL	IOW	POC	TOR		MOH	SNM	BAL	HOU		FON		
2013	Dallara DW12	Chevrolet IndyCar V6 t	(United States) Ryan Hunter-Reay	1	18	1*	24	11	3	2	18	2	1	2	20	18	19	5	6	20	20	21	9	7th	469
2013	Dallara DW12	Chevrolet IndyCar V6 t	(Venezuela) E. J. Viso	5	7	12	22	6	18	17	17	10	4	10	21	14	5	17	14	13	9	16		15th	340
2013	Dallara DW12	Chevrolet IndyCar V6 t	(Colombia) Carlos Muñoz (R)	5																			23	28th	74
2013	Dallara DW12	Chevrolet IndyCar V6 t	(Colombia) Carlos Muñoz (R)	26					2															28th	74
2013	Dallara DW12	Chevrolet IndyCar V6 t	(United States) Marco Andretti	25	3	7	7	3	4	20	6	5	20	9	10*	4	9	9	4	10	13	20	7	5th	484
2013	Dallara DW12	Chevrolet IndyCar V6 t	(Canada) James Hinchcliffe	27	1	26	26	1	21	15	19	9	5	1*	24	8	21	10	8	7	24	3	4	8th	449
2014					STP	LBH	ALA	IMS	INDY	DET		TXS	HOU		POC	IOW	TOR		MOH	MIL	SNM	FON			
2014	Dallara DW12	Honda HI14TT V6 t	(United States) Marco Andretti	25	22	8	2	14	3	10	16	22	8	9	9	18	16	8	22	13	8	11		9th	463
2014	Dallara DW12	Honda HI14TT V6 t	(France) Franck Montagny	26				22																36th	8
2014	Dallara DW12	Honda HI14TT V6 t	(United States) Kurt Busch (R)	26					6															25th	80
2014	Dallara DW12	Honda HI14TT V6 t	(Canada) James Hinchcliffe	27	19	21	7	20	28	6	5	15	5*	14	12	6	8	18	3	19	12	5		12th	456
2014	Dallara DW12	Honda HI14TT V6 t	(United States) Ryan Hunter-Reay	28	2	20*	1*	2	1*	16	19	19	7	6	18	1	21	14	10	21	2	16		6th	563
2014	Dallara DW12	Honda HI14TT V6 t	(Colombia) Carlos Muñoz	34	17	3	23	24	4	7	8	13	3	22	3	12	17	17	4	22	19	8		8th	483
2015					STP	NOL	LBH	ALA	IMS	INDY	DET		TXS	TOR	FON	MIL	IOW	MOH	POC	SNM					
2015	Dallara DW12	Honda HI15TT V6 t	(United Kingdom) Justin Wilson	25					24	21						18	17	2	15†					24th	108
2015	Dallara DW12	Honda HI15TT V6 t	(Spain) Oriol Servià	25																12				32nd	46
2015	Dallara DW12	Honda HI15TT V6 t	(Switzerland) Simona de Silvestro	25	18	4																		30th	66
2015	Dallara DW12	Honda HI15TT V6 t	(Switzerland) Simona de Silvestro	29						19														30th	66
2015	Dallara DW12	Honda HI15TT V6 t	(Colombia) Carlos Muñoz	26	14	12	9	6	13	20	1	23	6	22	12	15	5	9	5	22				13th	349
2015	Dallara DW12	Honda HI15TT V6 t	(United States) Marco Andretti	27	10	13	8	10	16	6	2*	5	5	13	3	8	7	10	18	11				9th	429
2015	Dallara DW12	Honda HI15TT V6 t	(United States) Ryan Hunter-Reay	28	7	19	13	5	11	15	13	8	18	19	15	13	1	7	1	2				6th	436
2016					STP	PHX	LBH	ALA	IMS	INDY	DET		ROA	IOW	TOR	MOH	POC	TXS	WGL	SNM					
2016	Dallara DW12	Honda HI16TT V6 t	(Colombia) Carlos Muñoz	26	8	22	12	14	12	2	6	15	10	12	17	3	7	7	11	15				10th	432
2016	Dallara DW12	Honda HI16TT V6 t	(United States) Marco Andretti	27	15	13	19	12	15	13	16	9	12	14	10	13	12	12	12	8				16th	339
2016	Dallara DW12	Honda HI16TT V6 t	(United States) Ryan Hunter-Reay	28	3	10	18	11	9	24*	7	3	4	22	12	18	3	13	14	4				12th	428
2016	Dallara DW12	Honda HI16TT V6 t	(United States) Townsend Bell	29						21														27th	55
2016	Dallara DW12	Honda HI16TT V6 t	(United States) Alexander Rossi^{5} (R)	98	12	14	20	15	10	1	10	12	15	6	16	14	20	11	8	5				11th	430
2017					STP	LBH	ALA	PHX	IMS	INDY	DET		TXS	ROA	IOW	TOR	MOH	POC	GAT	WGL	SNM				
2017	Dallara DW12	Honda HI17TT V6 t	(Japan) Takuma Sato	26	5	18	9	16	12	1	8	4	10	19	16	16	5	13	19	19	20			8th	441
2017	Dallara DW12	Honda HI17TT V6 t	(United States) Marco Andretti	27	7	20	21	18	16	8	12	13	6	18	17	4	12	11	14	16	7			12th	388
2017	Dallara DW12	Honda HI17TT V6 t	(United States) Ryan Hunter-Reay	28	4	17	11	13	3	27	13	17	19	14	3	6	8	8	15	3	8			9th	421
2017	Dallara DW12	Honda HI17TT V6 t	(Spain) Fernando Alonso^{6} (R)	29						24														29th	47
2017	Dallara DW12	Honda HI17TT V6 t	(United Kingdom) Jack Harvey^{7} (R)	50						31														28th	57
2017	Dallara DW12	Honda HI17TT V6 t	(United States) Alexander Rossi^{5}	98	11	19	5	15	8	7	5	7	22	13	11	2	6	3	6	1*	21			7th	494
2018					STP	PHX	LBH	ALA	IMS	INDY	DET		TXS	ROA	IOW	TOR	MOH	POC	GAT	POR	SNM				
2018	Dallara DW12	Honda HI18TT V6 t	(United Kingdom) Stefan Wilson (R)	25						15														34th	31
2018	Dallara DW12	Honda HI18TT V6 t	(United States) Zach Veach (R)	26	16	16	4	13	23	23	12	13	16	22	20	7	10	6	5	19	14			15th	313
2018	Dallara DW12	Honda HI18TT V6 t	(United States) Alexander Rossi	27	3	3	1*	11	5	4	3	12*	3	16	9	8	1*	1*	2	8*	7			2nd	621
2018	Dallara DW12	Honda HI18TT V6 t	(United States) Ryan Hunter-Reay	28	5	5	20	2	18	5	2	1	5	2	19	16	7	18	20	2	1*			4th	566
2018	Dallara DW12	Honda HI18TT V6 t	(Colombia) Carlos Muñoz	29						7														25th	95
2018	Dallara DW12	Honda HI18TT V6 t	(United States) Marco Andretti^{5}	98	9	12	6	10	13	12	4	9	14	11	16	10	11	7	14	25	5			9th	392
2019					STP	COA	ALA	LBH	IMS	INDY	DET		TXS	ROA	TOR	IOW	MOH	POC	GAT	POR	LAG				
2019	Dallara DW12	Honda HI19TT V6 t	(United States) Conor Daly	25						10											22			24th	149
2019	Dallara DW12	Honda HI19TT V6 t	(United States) Zach Veach	26	14	22	12	17	12	29	8	8	20	18	13	7	21	13	14	22	18			18th	271
2019	Dallara DW12	Honda HI19TT V6 t	(United States) Alexander Rossi	27	5	9	5	1*	22	2	2	5	2	1*	3	6	5	18	13	3	6			3rd	608
2019	Dallara DW12	Honda HI19TT V6 t	(United States) Ryan Hunter-Reay	28	23	3	8	5	17	8	5	4	5*	11	16	17	3	19	8	18	10			8th	420
2019	Dallara DW12	Honda HI19TT V6 t	(United States) Marco Andretti^{8}	98	13	6	14	13	13	26	16	6	10	23	10	21	15	15	10	13	14			16th	303
2020					TXS	IMS	ROA		IOW		INDY	GAT		MOH		IMS		STP							
2020	Dallara DW12	Honda HI20TT V6 t	(United States) Zach Veach	26	4	14	16	16	23	20	15	21	22	20	17									21st	166
2020	Dallara DW12	Honda HI20TT V6 t	(United States) Alexander Rossi	27	15	25	19	3	6	8	27	22	14	3	2	2	3	21						9th	317
2020	Dallara DW12	Honda HI20TT V6 t	(United States) Ryan Hunter-Reay	28	8	13	4	22	16	22	10	7	11	5	3	19	16	5						10th	315
2020	Dallara DW12	Honda HI20TT V6 t	(Canada) James Hinchcliffe	29	18	11					7					14	13	14						23rd	138
2020	Dallara DW12	Honda HI20TT V6 t	Andretti Harding Steinbrenner Autosport																						
2020	Dallara DW12	Honda HI20TT V6 t	(United States) Colton Herta	88	7	4	5	5	19	19	8	4	6	9	1*	4	2	11						3rd	421
2020	Dallara DW12	Honda HI20TT V6 t	Andretti Herta Autosport with Marco Andretti & Curb-Agajanian																						
2020	Dallara DW12	Honda HI20TT V6 t	(United States) Marco Andretti	98	14	22	22	19	22	10	13	23	15	23	20	25	22	20						20th	176
2021					ALA	STP	TXS		IMS	INDY	DET		ROA	MOH	NSH	IMS	GAT	POR	LAG	LBH					
2021	Dallara DW12	Honda HI21TT V6 t	(United States) Colton Herta	26	22	1*	22	5	13	16	14	4	2	13	19*	3	18	8	1*	1*				5th	455
2021	Dallara DW12	Honda HI21TT V6 t	(United States) Alexander Rossi	27	9	21	8	20	7	29	7	13	7	5	17	4	17	2	25	6				10th	332
2021	Dallara DW12	Honda HI21TT V6 t	(United States) Ryan Hunter-Reay	28	24	14	16	10	12	22	21	11	13	24	4	18	7	15	11	23				17th	256
2021	Dallara DW12	Honda HI21TT V6 t	(Canada) James Hinchcliffe	29	17	18	23	18	18	21	17	14	15	17	3	22	15	27	20	14				20th	220
2021	Dallara DW12	Honda HI21TT V6 t	(United States) Marco Andretti^{8}	98						19														35th	22
2022					STP	TXS	LBH	ALA	IMS	INDY	DET	ROA	MOH	TOR	IOW		IMS	NSH	GAT	POR	LAG				
2022	Dallara DW12	Honda HI22TT V6 t	(United States) Colton Herta	26	4	12	23	10	1	30	8	5	15	2	24	12	24	5	11	6	11			10th	381
2022	Dallara DW12	Honda HI22TT V6 t	(United States) Alexander Rossi	27	20	27	8	9	11	5	2	3	19	23	13	18	1*	4	25	7	10			9th	381
2022	Dallara DW12	Honda HI22TT V6 t	(France) Romain Grosjean	28	5	26	2	7	17	31	17	4	21	16	7	9	16	16	13	19	7			13th	328
2022	Dallara DW12	Honda HI22TT V6 t	(Canada) Devlin DeFrancesco (R)	29	22	24	25	17	21	20	18	18	17	18	17	15	18	22	12	16	15			23rd	206
2022	Dallara DW12	Honda HI22TT V6 t	(United States) Marco Andretti^{8}	98						22														33rd	17
2023					STP	TXS	LBH	ALA	IMS	INDY	DET	ROA	MOH	TOR	IOW		NSH	IMS	GAT	POR	LAG				
2023	Dallara DW12	Honda HI23TT V6 t	(United States) Colton Herta	26	20	7	4	14	9	9	11	5	11	3	19	7	21	13	6	13	23			10th	356
2023	Dallara DW12	Honda HI23TT V6 t	(United States) Kyle Kirkwood	27	15	27	1*	12	14	28	6	9	17	15	7	11	1*	9	15	10	25			11th	352
2023	Dallara DW12	Honda HI23TT V6 t	(France) Romain Grosjean	28	18	14	2	2*	11	30	24	25	13	22	11	12	6	18	12	27	11			13th	296
2023	Dallara DW12	Honda HI23TT V6 t	(Canada) Devlin DeFrancesco	29	25	23	16	23	17	13	12	23	14	23	22	21	26	19	19	17	22			22nd	177
2023	Dallara DW12	Honda HI23TT V6 t	(United States) Marco Andretti^{8}	98						17														35th	13
2024					STP	THE^{1}	LBH	ALA	IMS	INDY	DET	ROA	LAG	MOH	IOW		TOR	GAT	POR	MIL		NSH			
2024	Dallara DW12	Honda HI24TT V6 t	(United States) Colton Herta	26	3	4	2	8	7	23	19	6	2	4	11	5	1*	5	4	22	3	1		2nd	513
2024	Dallara DW12	Honda HI24TT V6 t	(United States) Kyle Kirkwood	27	10	DNQ	7	10	11	7	4	5	5	8	7	16	2	22	10	12	8	4*		7th	420
2024	Dallara DW12	Honda HI24TT V6 t	(Sweden) Marcus Ericsson	28	23	DNQ	5	18	16	33	2	9	10	5	9	23	18	24	6	27	5	25		15th	297
2024	Dallara DW12	Honda HI24TT V6 t	(United States) Marco Andretti^{8}	98						25														43rd	5
2025					STP	THE	LBH	ALA	IGP	INDY	DET	GAT	ROA	MOH	IOW		TOR	LAG	POR	MIL	NSH				
2025	Dallara DW12	Honda HI25TT V6 t	(United States) Colton Herta	26	16	4	7	7	25	14	3	17	16	4	13	20	4	3	10	11	11			7th	372
2025	Dallara DW12	Honda HI25TT V6 t	(United States) Kyle Kirkwood	27	5	8	1*	11	8	32	1*	1	4	8	26	18	6	16	20	12	6			4th	433
2025	Dallara DW12	Honda HI25TT V6 t	(Sweden) Marcus Ericsson	28	6	21	12	20	26	31	13	13	21	12	15	22	5	25	22	19	15			20th	234
2025	Dallara DW12	Honda HI25TT V6 t	(United States) Marco Andretti^{8}	98						29														34th	5
2026					STP	PHX	ARL	ALA	LBH	IMS	INDY	DET	GAT	ROA	MOH	NSH	POR	MAR	D.C.	MIL		LAG			
2026	Dallara DW12	Honda HI26TT V6 t	(Australia) Will Power	26	22	16	3	12	19	13	29	22	8	3	6	20	3	3	3	25	14	13		11th	368
2026	Dallara DW12	Honda HI26TT V6 t	(United States) Kyle Kirkwood	27	4	2	1*	5	4	9	16	2	6	10	3	10	5	21	1*	15	6	2		2nd	545
2026	Dallara DW12	Honda HI26TT V6 t	(Sweden) Marcus Ericsson	28	6	17	4	9	25	22	13	8	2	13	21	6	6	1	4	8	9	9		7th	429

* Season still in progress

1. Non-points-paying, exhibition race.
2. The final race at Las Vegas was canceled due to Dan Wheldon's death.
3. In conjunction with AFS Racing.
4. In conjunction with Conquest Racing.
5. In conjunction with Bryan Herta Autosport and Curb-Agajanian.
6. In conjunction with McLaren-Honda.
7. In conjunction with Michael Shank Racing.
8. In conjunction with Bryan Herta Autosport with Marco Andretti and Curb-Agajanian

==== IndyCar wins ====
IndyCar wins
#	Season	Date	Sanction	Track / Race	No.	Winning driver	Chassis	Engine	Tire	Grid	Laps Led
1	1994	September 11	CART	Road America (R)	12	(Canada) Jacques Villeneuve	Reynard 94I	Ford Ford XB V8t	Goodyear		
2	1995	March 5	CART	Bicentennial Park (S)	27	(Canada) Jacques Villeneuve (2)	Reynard 95I	Ford Ford XB V8t	Goodyear		
3	1995	May 28	CART	Indianapolis Motor Speedway (O)	27	(Canada) Jacques Villeneuve (3)	Reynard 95I	Ford Ford XB V8t	Goodyear	5	15
4	1995	July 9	CART	Road America (R)	27	(Canada) Jacques Villeneuve (4)	Reynard 95I	Ford Ford XB V8t	Goodyear	Pole	
5	1995	July 23	CART	Cleveland Burke Lakefront Airport (S)	27	(Canada) Jacques Villeneuve (5)	Reynard 95I	Ford Ford XB V8t	Goodyear		
6	1998	August 16	CART	Road America (R)	27	(United Kingdom) Dario Franchitti	Reynard 98I	Honda HRK V8t	Firestone		
7	1998	September 6	CART	Streets of Vancouver (S)	27	(United Kingdom) Dario Franchitti (2)	Reynard 98I	Honda HRK V8t	Firestone	Pole	
8	1998	October 4	CART	George R. Brown Convention Center (S)	27	(United Kingdom) Dario Franchitti (3)	Reynard 98I	Honda HRK V8t	Firestone		
9	1999	June 6	CART	Milwaukee Mile (O)	26	(Canada) Paul Tracy	Reynard 99I	Honda HRS V8t	Firestone		
10	1999	July 18	CART	Exhibition Place (S)	27	(United Kingdom) Dario Franchitti (4)	Reynard 99I	Honda HRS V8t	Firestone		
11	1999	August 8	CART	The Raceway on Belle Isle Park (S)	27	(United Kingdom) Dario Franchitti (5)	Reynard 99I	Honda HRS V8t	Firestone		
12	1999	September 26	CART	George R. Brown Convention Center (S)	26	(Canada) Paul Tracy (2)	Reynard 99I	Honda HRS V8t	Firestone		
13	1999	October 17	CART	Surfers Paradise Street Circuit (S)	27	(United Kingdom) Dario Franchitti (6)	Reynard 99I	Honda HRS V8t	Firestone	Pole	
14	2000	April 16	CART	Streets of Long Beach (S)	26	(Canada) Paul Tracy (3)	Reynard 2KI	Honda HR-0 V8t	Firestone		
15	2000	August 20	CART	Road America (R)	26	(Canada) Paul Tracy (4)	Reynard 2KI	Honda HR-0 V8t	Firestone		
16	2000	September 3	CART	Concord Pacific Place (S)	26	(Canada) Paul Tracy (5)	Reynard 2KI	Honda HR-0 V8t	Firestone		
17	2001	July 1	CART	Cleveland Burke Lakefront Airport (S)	27	(United Kingdom) Dario Franchitti (7)	Reynard 01i	Honda HR-1 V8t	Firestone		
18	2001	July 15	CART	Exhibition Place (S)	39	(United States) Michael Andretti	Reynard 01i	Honda HR-1 V8t	Firestone		
19	2002	April 14	CART	Streets of Long Beach (S)	39	(United States) Michael Andretti (2)	Reynard 02i	Honda HR-2 V8t	Bridgestone		
20	2002	June 2	CART	Milwaukee Mile (O)	26	(Canada) Paul Tracy (6)	Lola B2/00	Honda HR-2 V8t	Bridgestone		
21	2002	July 28	CART	Concord Pacific Place (S)	27	(United Kingdom) Dario Franchitti (8)	Lola B2/00	Honda HR-2 V8t	Bridgestone		
22	2002	August 25	CART	Circuit Gilles Villeneuve (S)	27	(United Kingdom) Dario Franchitti (9)	Lola B2/00	Honda HR-2 V8t	Bridgestone		
23	2002	September 14	CART	Rockingham Motor Speedway (O)	27	(United Kingdom) Dario Franchitti (10)	Lola B2/00	Honda HR-2 V8t	Bridgestone		
24	2003	March 23	IndyCar	Phoenix International Raceway (O)	11	(Brazil) Tony Kanaan	Dallara IR-03	Honda HI3R V8	Firestone	Pole	
25	2003	July 6	IndyCar	Kansas Speedway (O)	27	(United States) Bryan Herta	Dallara IR-03	Honda HI3R V8	Firestone		
26	2004	March 21	IndyCar	Phoenix International Raceway (O)	11	(Brazil) Tony Kanaan (2)	Dallara IR-04	Honda HI4R V8	Firestone		
27	2004	April 17	IndyCar	Twin Ring Motegi (O)	26	(United Kingdom) Dan Wheldon	Dallara IR-04	Honda HI4R V8	Firestone	Pole	
28	2004	June 12	IndyCar	Texas Motor Speedway (O)	11	(Brazil) Tony Kanaan (3)	Dallara IR-04	Honda HI4R V8	Firestone		
29	2004	June 26	IndyCar	Richmond International Raceway (O)	26	(United Kingdom) Dan Wheldon (2)	Dallara IR-04	Honda HI4R V8	Firestone		
30	2004	July 17	IndyCar	Nashville Superspeedway (O)	11	(Brazil) Tony Kanaan (4)	Dallara IR-04	Honda HI4R V8	Firestone		
31	2004	July 25	IndyCar	The Milwaukee Mile (O)	27	(United Kingdom) Dario Franchitti (11)	Dallara IR-04	Honda HI4R V8	Firestone		
32	2004	August 22	IndyCar	Pikes Peak International Raceway (O)	27	(United Kingdom) Dario Franchitti (12)	Dallara IR-04	Honda HI4R V8	Firestone		
33	2004	August 29	IndyCar	Nazareth Speedway (O)	26	(United Kingdom) Dan Wheldon (3)	Dallara IR-04	Honda HI4R V8	Firestone		
34	2005	March 6	IndyCar	Homestead-Miami Speedway (O)	26	(United Kingdom) Dan Wheldon (4)	Dallara IR-05	Honda HI5R V8	Firestone		
35	2005	April 3	IndyCar	Streets of St. Petersburg (S)	26	(United Kingdom) Dan Wheldon (5)	Dallara IR-05	Honda HI5R V8	Firestone		
36	2005	April 30	IndyCar	Twin Ring Motegi (O)	26	(United Kingdom) Dan Wheldon (6)	Dallara IR-05	Honda HI5R V8	Firestone		
37	2005	May 29	IndyCar	Indianapolis Motor Speedway (O)	26	(United Kingdom) Dan Wheldon (7)	Dallara IR-05	Honda HI5R V8	Firestone	16	30
38	2005	July 3	IndyCar	Kansas Speedway (O)	11	(Brazil) Tony Kanaan (5)	Dallara IR-05	Honda HI5R V8	Firestone		
39	2005	July 16	IndyCar	Nashville Superspeedway (O)	27	(United Kingdom) Dario Franchitti (13)	Dallara IR-05	Honda HI5R V8	Firestone		
40	2005	July 31	IndyCar	Michigan International Speedway (O)	7	(United States) Bryan Herta (2)	Dallara IR-05	Honda HI5R V8	Firestone	Pole	
41	2005	August 21	IndyCar	Pikes Peak International Raceway (O)	26	(United Kingdom) Dan Wheldon (8)	Dallara IR-05	Honda HI5R V8	Firestone		
42	2005	August 28	IndyCar	Infineon Raceway (R)	11	(Brazil) Tony Kanaan (6)	Dallara IR-05	Honda HI5R V8	Firestone		
43	2005	September 11	IndyCar	Chicagoland Speedway (O)	26	(United Kingdom) Dan Wheldon (9)	Dallara IR-05	Honda HI5R V8	Firestone		
44	2005	October 16	IndyCar	California Speedway (O)	27	(United Kingdom) Dario Franchitti (14)	Dallara IR-05	Honda HI5R V8	Firestone	Pole	
45	2006	July 23	IndyCar	The Milwaukee Mile (O)	11	(Brazil) Tony Kanaan (7)	Dallara IR-05	Honda HI6R V8	Firestone		
46	2006	August 27	IndyCar	Infineon Raceway (R)	26	(United States) Marco Andretti	Dallara IR-05	Honda HI6R V8	Firestone		
47	2007	April 21	IndyCar	Twin Ring Motegi (O)	11	(Brazil) Tony Kanaan (8)	Dallara IR-05	Honda HI7R V8	Firestone		
48	2007	May 27	IndyCar	Indianapolis Motor Speedway (O)	27	(United Kingdom) Dario Franchitti (15)	Dallara IR-05	Honda HI7R V8	Firestone	3	34
49	2007	June 3	IndyCar	The Milwaukee Mile (O)	11	(Brazil) Tony Kanaan (9)	Dallara IR-05	Honda HI7R V8	Firestone		
50	2007	June 24	IndyCar	Iowa Speedway (O)	27	(United Kingdom) Dario Franchitti (16)	Dallara IR-05	Honda HI7R V8	Firestone		
51	2007	June 30	IndyCar	Richmond International Raceway (O)	27	(United Kingdom) Dario Franchitti (17)	Dallara IR-05	Honda HI7R V8	Firestone	Pole	
52	2007	August 5	IndyCar	Michigan International Speedway (O)	11	(Brazil) Tony Kanaan (10)	Dallara IR-05	Honda HI7R V8	Firestone		
53	2007	August 11	IndyCar	Kentucky Speedway (O)	11	(Brazil) Tony Kanaan (11)	Dallara IR-05	Honda HI7R V8	Firestone	Pole	
54	2007	September 2	IndyCar	Belle Isle Park (S)	11	(Brazil) Tony Kanaan (12)	Dallara IR-05	Honda HI7R V8	Firestone		
55	2007	September 9	IndyCar	Chicagoland Speedway (O)	27	(United Kingdom) Dario Franchitti (18)	Dallara IR-05	Honda HI7R V8	Firestone	Pole	
56	2008	April 20	IndyCar	Twin Ring Motegi (O)	7	(United States) Danica Patrick	Dallara IR-05	Honda HI7R V8	Firestone		
57	2008	June 28	IndyCar	Richmond International Raceway (S)	11	(Brazil) Tony Kanaan (13)	Dallara IR-05	Honda HI7R V8	Firestone	Pole	
58	2010	April 18	IndyCar	Streets of Long Beach (S)	37	(United States) Ryan Hunter-Reay	Dallara IR-05	Honda HI7R V8	Firestone		
59	2010	June 20	IndyCar	Iowa Speedway (O)	11	(Brazil) Tony Kanaan (14)	Dallara IR-05	Honda HI7R V8	Firestone		
60	2011	April 17	IndyCar	Streets of Long Beach (S)	27	(United Kingdom) Mike Conway	Dallara IR-05	Honda HI7R V8	Firestone		
61	2011	June 25	IndyCar	Iowa Speedway (O)	26	(United States) Marco Andretti (2)	Dallara IR-05	Honda HI7R V8	Firestone		
62	2011	August 14	IndyCar	New Hampshire Motor Speedway (O)	28	(United States) Ryan Hunter-Reay (2)	Dallara IR-05	Honda HI7R V8	Firestone		
63	2012	June 16	IndyCar	Milwaukee Mile (O)	28	(United States) Ryan Hunter-Reay (3)	Dallara DW12	Chevrolet IndyCar V6t	Firestone		
64	2012	June 23	IndyCar	Iowa Speedway (O)	28	(United States) Ryan Hunter-Reay (4)	Dallara DW12	Chevrolet IndyCar V6t	Firestone		
65	2012	July 8	IndyCar	Exhibition Place (S)	28	(United States) Ryan Hunter-Reay (5)	Dallara DW12	Chevrolet IndyCar V6t	Firestone		
66	2012	September 2	IndyCar	Streets of Baltimore (S)	28	(United States) Ryan Hunter-Reay (6)	Dallara DW12	Chevrolet IndyCar V6t	Firestone		
67	2013	March 24	IndyCar	Streets of St. Petersburg (S)	27	(Canada) James Hinchcliffe	Dallara DW12	Chevrolet IndyCar V6t	Firestone		
68	2013	April 7	IndyCar	Barber Motorsports Park (R)	1	(United States) Ryan Hunter-Reay (7)	Dallara DW12	Chevrolet IndyCar V6t	Firestone	Pole	
69	2013	May 5	IndyCar	Streets of São Paulo (S)	27	(Canada) James Hinchcliffe (2)	Dallara DW12	Chevrolet IndyCar V6t	Firestone		
70	2013	June 15	IndyCar	Milwaukee Mile (O)	1	(United States) Ryan Hunter-Reay (8)	Dallara DW12	Chevrolet IndyCar V6t	Firestone		
71	2013	June 23	IndyCar	Iowa Speedway (O)	27	(Canada) James Hinchcliffe (3)	Dallara DW12	Chevrolet IndyCar V6t	Firestone		
72	2014	April 27	IndyCar	Barber Motorsports Park (R)	28	(United States) Ryan Hunter-Reay (9)	Dallara DW12	Honda HI14TT V6t	Firestone		
73	2014	May 25	IndyCar	Indianapolis Motor Speedway (O)	28	(United States) Ryan Hunter-Reay (10)	Dallara DW12	Honda HI14TT V6t	Firestone	19	56
74	2014	July 12	IndyCar	Iowa Speedway (O)	28	(United States) Ryan Hunter-Reay (11)	Dallara DW12	Honda HI14TT V6t	Firestone		
75	2015	May 30	IndyCar	Belle Isle (S)	26	(Colombia) Carlos Muñoz	Dallara DW12	Honda HI15TT V6t	Firestone		
76	2015	July 18	IndyCar	Iowa Speedway (O)	28	(United States) Ryan Hunter-Reay (12)	Dallara DW12	Honda HI15TT V6t	Firestone		
77	2015	August 23	IndyCar	Pocono Raceway (O)	28	(United States) Ryan Hunter-Reay (13)	Dallara DW12	Honda HI15TT V6t	Firestone		
78	2016	May 29	IndyCar	Indianapolis Motor Speedway (O)	98	(United States) Alexander Rossi	Dallara DW12	Honda HI16TT V6t	Firestone	11	14
79	2017	May 28	IndyCar	Indianapolis Motor Speedway (O)	26	(Japan) Takuma Sato	Dallara DW12	Honda HI17TT V6t	Firestone	4	17
80	2017	September 3	IndyCar	Watkins Glen International (R)	98	(United States) Alexander Rossi (2)	Dallara DW12	Honda HI17TT V6t	Firestone	Pole	
81	2018	April 15	IndyCar	Streets of Long Beach (S)	27	(United States) Alexander Rossi (3)	Dallara DW12	Honda HI18TT V6t	Firestone	Pole	
82	2018	June 3	IndyCar	Belle Isle Park (S)	28	(United States) Ryan Hunter-Reay (14)	Dallara DW12	Honda HI18TT V6t	Firestone		
83	2018	July 29	IndyCar	Mid-Ohio Sports Car Course (R)	27	(United States) Alexander Rossi (4)	Dallara DW12	Honda HI18TT V6t	Firestone	Pole	
84	2018	August 19	IndyCar	Pocono Raceway (O)	27	(United States) Alexander Rossi (5)	Dallara DW12	Honda HI18TT V6t	Firestone		
85	2018	September 16	IndyCar	Sonoma Raceway (R)	28	(United States) Ryan Hunter-Reay (15)	Dallara DW12	Honda HI18TT V6t	Firestone	Pole	
86	2019	April 14	IndyCar	Streets of Long Beach (S)	27	(United States) Alexander Rossi (6)	Dallara DW12	Honda HI19TT V6t	Firestone	Pole	
87	2019	June 23	IndyCar	Road America (R)	27	(United States) Alexander Rossi (7)	Dallara DW12	Honda HI19TT V6t	Firestone		
88	2020	September 13	IndyCar	Mid-Ohio Sports Car Course (R)	88	(United States) Colton Herta	Dallara DW12	Honda HI20TT V6t	Firestone	Pole	
89	2021	April 25	IndyCar	Streets of St. Petersburg (S)	26	(United States) Colton Herta (2)	Dallara DW12	Honda HI21TT V6t	Firestone	Pole	
90	2021	September 19	IndyCar	WeatherTech Raceway Laguna Seca (R)	26	(United States) Colton Herta (3)	Dallara DW12	Honda HI21TT V6t	Firestone	Pole	
91	2021	September 26	IndyCar	Streets of Long Beach (S)	26	(United States) Colton Herta (4)	Dallara DW12	Honda HI21TT V6t	Firestone		
92	2022	May 14	IndyCar	Indianapolis Motor Speedway (R)	26	(United States) Colton Herta (5)	Dallara DW12	Honda HI22TT V6t	Firestone	14	50
93	2022	July 30	IndyCar	Indianapolis Motor Speedway (R)	27	(United States) Alexander Rossi (8)	Dallara DW12	Honda HI22TT V6t	Firestone	2	44
94	2023	April 16	IndyCar	Streets of Long Beach (S)	27	(United States) Kyle Kirkwood	Dallara DW12	Honda HI23TT V6t	Firestone	Pole	53
95	2023	August 6	IndyCar	Nashville Street Circuit (S)	27	(United States) Kyle Kirkwood (2)	Dallara DW12	Honda HI23TT V6t	Firestone	8	34
96	2024	July 21	IndyCar	Exhibition Place (S)	26	(United States) Colton Herta (6)	Dallara DW12	Honda HI24TT V6t	Firestone	Pole	81
97	2024	September 15	IndyCar	Nashville Superspeedway (O)	26	(United States) Colton Herta (7)	Dallara DW12	Honda HI24TT V6t	Firestone	9	24
98	2025	April 13	IndyCar	Streets of Long Beach (S)	27	(United States) Kyle Kirkwood (3)	Dallara DW12	Honda HI25TT V6t	Firestone	Pole	46
99	2025	June 1	IndyCar	Streets of Detroit (S)	27	(United States) Kyle Kirkwood (4)	Dallara DW12	Honda HI25TT V6t	Firestone	3	48
100	2025	June 15	IndyCar	World Wide Technology Raceway (O)	27	(United States) Kyle Kirkwood (5)	Dallara DW12	Honda HI25TT V6t	Firestone	10	8
101	2026	March 15	IndyCar	Streets of Arlington (S)	27	(United States) Kyle Kirkwood (6)	Dallara DW12	Honda HI26TT V6t	Firestone	7	16
102	2026	August 16	IndyCar	Streets of Markham (S)	28	(Sweden) Marcus Ericsson (5)	Dallara DW12	Honda HI26TT V6t	Firestone	4	21
103	2026	August 23	IndyCar	Streets of Washington, D.C. (S)	27	(United States) Kyle Kirkwood (7)	Dallara DW12	Honda HI26TT V6t	Firestone	2	128

==== IndyCar champions ====
Year	Champion	Wins	Chassis	Engine	Tires
2004	(Brazil) Tony Kanaan	3	Dallara IR-04	Honda HI4R	Firestone
2005	(United Kingdom) Dan Wheldon	6	Dallara IR-05	Honda HI5R	Firestone
2007	(United Kingdom) Dario Franchitti	4	Dallara IR-05	Honda HI7R	Firestone
2012	(United States) Ryan Hunter-Reay	4	Dallara DW12	Chevrolet	Firestone

==== Indianapolis 500 victories ====
Year	Champion	Chassis	Engine	Tires
2005	(United Kingdom) Dan Wheldon	Dallara IR-05	Honda HI5R	Firestone
2007	(United Kingdom) Dario Franchitti	Dallara IR-05	Honda HI7R	Firestone
2014	(United States) Ryan Hunter-Reay	Dallara DW12	Honda HI14TT	Firestone
2016	(United States) Alexander Rossi	Dallara DW12	Honda HI16TT	Firestone
2017	(Japan) Takuma Sato	Dallara DW12	Honda HI17TT	Firestone

=== Infiniti Pro Series/Indy Pro Series/Indy Lights ===
(key)

Indy Lights results
Year	Chassis	Engine	Drivers	No.	1	2	3	4	5	6	7	8	9	10	11	12	13	14	15	16	17	18	Points		Position	
Andretti-Green Racing
2005					HMS	PHX	STP	INDY	TEX	IMS	NSH	MIL	KTY	PPIR	SNM	CHI	WGL	FON					D.C.	T.C.	D.C.	T.C.
2005	Dallara	Infiniti	(United States) Marco Andretti (R)	26			1	16		1			3		1		2						250	—	10th	—
2006					HMS	STP		INDY	WGL	IMS	NAS	MIL	KTY	SNM		CHI							D.C.	T.C.	D.C.	T.C.
2006	Dallara	Infiniti	(United States) Jonathan Klein (R)	27	15	5	5	6	5	3	3	3	2	4	3	2							386	—	2nd	—
Andretti-Green/AFS Racing
2007					HMS	STP		INDY	MIL	IMS		IOW	WGL		NSH	MOH	KTY	SNM		CHI			D.C.	T.C.	D.C.	T.C.
2007	Dallara	Nissan VRH	(Brazil) Jaime Camara	11	4	23	8	3	17	3	5	21	7	10	3	8	5	5	17	20			373	—	6th	—
2007	Dallara	Nissan VRH	(New Zealand) Wade Cunningham	27	24	9	2	23	12	4	21	2	1	2	4	2	3	16	11	17			423	—	3rd	—
2008					HMS	STP		KAN	INDY	MIL	IOW	WGL		NAS	MOH		KTY	SNM		CHI			D.C.	T.C.	D.C.	T.C.
2008	Dallara	Nissan VRH	(Netherlands) Arie Luyendyk Jr. (R)	26	4	6	22	3	14	8	2	7	7	3	8	11	3	17	16	1			428	—	4th	—
2008	Dallara	Nissan VRH	(Brazil) Raphael Matos (R)	27	8	1	12	19	10	3	7	1	2	5	1	18	6	2	6	3			510	—	1st	—
2009					STP		LBH	KAN	INDY	MIL	IOW	WGL	TOR	EDM	KTY	MOH	SNM	CHI	HMS				D.C.	T.C.	D.C.	T.C.
2009	Dallara	Nissan VRH	(United States) J. R. Hildebrand	26	3*	21	1*	14	2*	2	6	1*	2	1*	17	3	1*	5	2*				545	—	1st	—
2009	Dallara	Nissan VRH	(Colombia) Sebastián Saavedra (R)	27	26	2*	8	1*	5	3	15	18	1*	3	2*	18	7	6	3				446	—	3rd	—
2010					STP	ALA	LBH	INDY	IOW	WGL	TOR	EDM	MOH	SNM	CHI	KTY	HMS						D.C.	T.C.	D.C.	T.C.
2010	Dallara	Nissan VRH	(United States) Charlie Kimball	26	4	2	2	2	13	11	4	4	3	2	14	6	13						388	—	4th	—
2010	Dallara	Nissan VRH	(United Kingdom) Martin Plowman	27	6	4	5	5	2	4	7	3	1*	16	13	7	6						392	—	3rd	—
Andretti Autosport
2011					STP	ALA	LBH	INDY	MIL	IOW	TOR	EDM		TRO	NHA	BAL	KTY	LSV					D.C.	T.C.	D.C.	T.C.
2011	Dallara	Nissan VRH	(United Kingdom) Stefan Wilson	5	16	2	3	4	8	8	1*	4	2	4	12	5	1*	8					450	—	3rd	—
2011	Dallara	Nissan VRH	(United Kingdom) James Winslow (R)	26	10	10	5	17															83	—	19th	—
2011	Dallara	Nissan VRH	(Republic of Ireland) Peter Dempsey (R)	26							2	12	3	5		9							264	—	10th	—
Andretti-AFS Racing
2012					STP	ALA	LBH	INDY	DET	MIL	IOW	TOR	EDM	TRO	BAL	FON							D.C.	T.C.	D.C.	T.C.
2012	Dallara	Nissan VRH	(Colombia) Carlos Muñoz (R)	26	14	14	5	2	2	5	7	10	1*	3	11	1*							377	—	5th	—
2012	Dallara	Nissan VRH	(Colombia) Sebastián Saavedra	27	3	1*	2	5	6	2	13	2	2	9	10	14							383	—	4th	—
2013					STP	ALA	LBH	INDY	MIL	IOW	POC	TOR	MOH	BAL	HOU	FON							D.C.	T.C.	D.C.	T.C.
2013	Dallara	Nissan VRH	(United States) Zach Veach (R)	12	5	9	9	5	3*	7	4	7	5	8	10	4							333	—	7th	—
2013	Dallara	Nissan VRH	(Colombia) Carlos Muñoz	26	7	1*	1*	4*	2	8	1*	4	4	9	12	1*							441	—	3rd	—
Andretti Autosport
2014					STP	LBH	ALA		IMS		INDY	POC	TOR	MOH		MIL	SNM						D.C.	T.C.	D.C.	T.C.
2014	Dallara	Nissan VRH	(United States) Zach Veach	26	1*	2	1*	3	9	7	3	2	5	4	2	1	7	3					520	370	3rd	2nd
2014	Dallara	Nissan VRH	(Australia) Matthew Brabham (R)	83	9	3	4	12	1*	4	2*	5	4	5	12	2*	6	5					424	370	4th	2nd
2015					STP		LBH	ALA		IMS		INDY	TOR		MIL	IOW	MOH		LAG				D.C.	T.C.	D.C.	T.C.
2015	Dallara IL-15	Mazda-AER MZR-R 2.0 Turbo I4	(United States) Shelby Blackstock (R)	51	10	11	9	9	10	8	8	8	4	6	11	9	3	6	8	5			218	145	10th	6th
2015	Dallara IL-15	Mazda-AER MZR-R 2.0 Turbo I4	(Australia) Matthew Brabham	83	11	7	11																35	145	13th	6th
2016					STP		PHX	ALA		IMS		INDY	ROA		IOW	TOR		MOH		WGL	LAG		D.C.	T.C.	D.C.	T.C.
2016	Dallara IL-15	Mazda-AER MZR-R 2.0 Turbo I4	(United Kingdom) Dean Stoneman (R)	27	8	6	5	16	3	3	1*	1*	2	9	4	5	14	3	2	10	13	9	316	281	5th	4th
2016	Dallara IL-15	Mazda-AER MZR-R 2.0 Turbo I4	(Canada) Dalton Kellett (R)	28	15	10	10	9	9	16	12	3	14	12	9	8	11	11	9	11	7	13	193	281	10th	4th
2016	Dallara IL-15	Mazda-AER MZR-R 2.0 Turbo I4	(United States) Shelby Blackstock	51	14	11	14	4	5	10	7	4	13	5	12	10	9	8	5	6	10	11	227	281	8th	4th
2017					STP		ALA		IMS		INDY	ROA		IOW	TOR		MOH		GAT	LAG			D.C.	T.C.	D.C.	T.C.
2017	Dallara IL-15	Mazda-AER MZR-R 2.0 Turbo I4																								
2017	Dallara IL-15	Mazda-AER MZR-R 2.0 Turbo I4	(France) Nico Jamin (R)	27	7	14	1*	3	1*	4	10	6	14	7	14	12	3	1*	11	5			269	389	7th	2nd
2017	Dallara IL-15	Mazda-AER MZR-R 2.0 Turbo I4	(Canada) Dalton Kellett	28	12	12	6	10	13	9	3	9	9	3	12	9	7	13	7	13			198	389	12th	2nd
2017	Dallara IL-15	Mazda-AER MZR-R 2.0 Turbo I4	(United States) Ryan Norman (R)	48	10	9	12	9	8	7	14	4	7	8	10	6	9	7	8	10			200	389	11th	2nd
2017	Dallara IL-15	Mazda-AER MZR-R 2.0 Turbo I4	(United States) Colton Herta^{1} (R)	98	2	1*	10	1*	12	10	13	12	3	4	4	10*	2	6	3	3			300	389	3rd	2nd
2018					STP		ALA		IMS		INDY	ROA		IOW	TOR		MOH		GAT	POR			D.C.	T.C.	D.C.	T.C.
2018	Dallara IL-15	Mazda-AER MZR-R 2.0 Turbo I4	(Mexico) Patricio O'Ward (R)	27	1*	7*	1*	1*	4	7	2	2	4	1*	1*	2	1*	1*	3	1*	1*		491	614	1st	1st
2018	Dallara IL-15	Mazda-AER MZR-R 2.0 Turbo I4	(Canada) Dalton Kellett	28	8	6	6	6	7	6	3*	7	6	5	5	5	3	5	7	7	7		299	614	7th	1st
2018	Dallara IL-15	Mazda-AER MZR-R 2.0 Turbo I4	(United States) Ryan Norman	48	6	3	5	7	5	5	5	6	5	4	3	4	5	3	1	5	8		345	614	4th	1st
2018	Dallara IL-15	Mazda-AER MZR-R 2.0 Turbo I4	(United States) Colton Herta^{1}	98	3	8	2	3	1*	1	1	1*	2	2	7	6	2	2	2*	2	4		447	614	2nd	1st
2019					STP		COTA		IMS		INDY	ROA		TOR		MOH		GAT	POR		LAG		D.C.	T.C.	D.C.	T.C.
2019	Dallara IL-15	AER 2.0 L Turbo I4	(United States) Jarett Andretti (R)	14							6												23	581	12th	
2019	Dallara IL-15	AER 2.0 L Turbo I4	(United States) Robert Megennis (R)	27	6	9	3	2	1*	4	8	2	6	6	5	4	9	5	3	5	3	4	355	581	5th	1st
2019	Dallara IL-15	AER 2.0 L Turbo I4	(United States) Oliver Askew (R)	28	3	10	1*	1*	2	3	1	5	3	2	1	1*	1*	1	2	3	4	2	486	581	1st	1st
2019	Dallara IL-15	AER 2.0 L Turbo I4	(United States) Ryan Norman	48	7	6	6	8	4	8	2*	1*	2	4	4	2	4	4	7	4	7	5	359	581	4th	1st

1. In conjunction with Steinbrenner Racing.

=== Star Mazda/Pro Mazda Championship ===
(key)

Pro Mazda Championship results
Year	Chassis	Engine	Drivers	No.	1	2	3	4	5	6	7	8	9	10	11	12	13	14	15	16	17	Points		Position	
2011					STP	ALA	IRP	MIL	IOW	MOS	TRO		SNM	BAL	LAG							D.C.	T.C.	D.C.	T.C.
2011	Star Race Cars	Mazda Renesis	(United States) Zach Veach (R)	77									7		3							—	195	NC	4th
2011	Star Race Cars	Mazda Renesis	(United States) Sage Karam (R)	88	15	9	3	1	1	13	4	5	4	2	16							364	195	5th	4th
2012					STP		ALA		IRP	IOW	TOR		EDM		TRO		BAL		LAG		ATL	D.C.	T.C.	D.C.	T.C.
2012	Star Race Cars	Mazda Renesis	(United States) Zach Veach	77	17	11	15	10	3	6	2	17	9	17	8	8	8	6	11	17	8	199	349	10th	4th
2012	Star Race Cars	Mazda Renesis	(United States) Sage Karam	88	8	7	2	12	2	1	21	3	2	2	2	1	15	1	7	19	2	325	349	3rd	4th
2013					COTA		STP		IRP	MIL	TOR		MOS		MOH		TRO		HOU			D.C.	T.C.	D.C.	T.C.
2013	Star Race Cars	Mazda Renesis	(United States) Shelby Blackstock (R)	28	9	3	2	3	3	7	6	7	2	1	2	4	6	11	4	6		297	513	3rd	1st
2013	Star Race Cars	Mazda Renesis	(Australia) Matthew Brabham (R)	83	3	1*	1*	1*	1*	1*	1*	1*	3	9	1*	1*	1*	1*	1*	1*		466	513	1st	1st
2014					STP		ALA		IMS		IRP	HOU		MOH		MIL	SNM					D.C.	T.C.	D.C.	T.C.
2014	Star Race Cars	Mazda Renesis	(Canada) Garett Grist (R)	27	17	17	8	7	6	4	1*	6	9	9	1*	12	15	9				199	238	8th	4th
2014	Star Race Cars	Mazda Renesis	(United States) Shelby Blackstock	28	10	4	5	3	2	17	7	5	3	3	19	3	5	3				235	238	4th	4th
2015					STP		NOLA		ALA		IMS			IRP	TOR		IOW	MOH		LAG		D.C.	T.C.	D.C.	T.C.
2015	Star Race Cars	Mazda Renesis	(Malaysia) Weiron Tan (R)	22	16	15	2	C	1*	14	1*	4	21	1*	13	2	1*	6	7	5	9	282	257	4th	4th
2015	Star Race Cars	Mazda Renesis	(Canada) Dalton Kellett	28	7	7	7	C	15	6	11	13	11	13	17	DNS	2	9	8	6	5	187	257	10th	4th

=== U.S. F2000 National Championship ===
(key)

U.S. F2000 National Championship results
Year	Chassis	Engine	Drivers	No.	1	2	3	4	5	6	7	8	9	10	11	12	13	14	15	16	17	Points		Position	
2010					STP		IRP	IOW	NJMP		ACC		ROA		ATL							D.C.	T.C.	D.C.	T.C.
2010	Élan DP08	Mazda MZR	(United States) Zach Veach	7			4	5	4	5	7	6	3	3	2	4						189	358	5th	1st
2010	Élan DP08	Mazda MZR	(United States) Sage Karam	8	1*	1*	2*	1*	1*	9	2	1*	1*	1*	1*	1*						351	358	1st	1st
2011					SEB		STP		IRP	MIL	MOH		ROA		BAL							D.C.	T.C.	D.C.	T.C.
2011	Élan DP08	Mazda MZR	(United States) Zach Veach	7	1*	8	3	4	2	2	5	7	3	5	12	16						223	314	4th	1st
2011	Élan DP08	Mazda MZR	(United States) Spencer Pigot (R)	8	3	2	1*	2	4	6	3	4	1*	2*	11	1*						281	314	3rd	1st
2012					SEB		STP		IRP	MOH		ROA			BAL		VIR					D.C.	T.C.	D.C.	T.C.
2012	Élan DP08	Mazda MZR	(Canada) Thomas McGregor (R)	7	4	7	7	7	12	27	10	23	28	21	9	9	9	9				134	144	9th	4th
2012	Élan DP08	Mazda MZR	(United States) Shelby Blackstock (R)	8	7	32	6	8	18	6	5	21	8	4	21	8	6	7				153	144	8th	4th
2013					SEB		STP		IRP	TOR		MOH			LAG		HOU					D.C.	T.C.	D.C.	T.C.
2013	Élan DP08	Mazda MZR	(Canada) Garett Grist (R)	7	2	5	22	6	2	22	6	27	5	1*	4	2	6	16				215	162	3rd	4th
2013	Élan DP08	Mazda MZR	(United States) Luca Forgeois	8								8	28	14								31	162	24th	4th
2013	Élan DP08	Mazda MZR	(United States) Austin Cindric (R)	77	24	29	23	28	22	27	13	12	15	9	20	13	8	7				77	162	17	4th

=== Formula E ===
(key)

Formula E results
Year	Chassis	Powertrain	Tyres	No.	Drivers	1	2	3	4	5	6	7	8	9	10	11	12	13	14	15	16	Points	T.C.	
Andretti Autosport
2014–15	Spark SRT01-e	SRT01-e^{1}	M			BEI	PUT	PDE	BUE	MIA	LBH	MCO	BER	MSC	LDN							119	6th	
2014–15	Spark SRT01-e	SRT01-e^{1}	M	27	(France) Franck Montagny	2	DSQ															119	6th	
2014–15	Spark SRT01-e	SRT01-e^{1}	M	27	(France) Jean-Éric Vergne			14†	6	18†	2	Ret	7	4	3	16†						119	6th	
2014–15	Spark SRT01-e	SRT01-e^{1}	M	28	(France) Charles Pic	4																119	6th	
2014–15	Spark SRT01-e	SRT01-e^{1}	M	28	(United States) Matthew Brabham		13	Ret														119	6th	
2014–15	Spark SRT01-e	SRT01-e^{1}	M	28	(United States) Marco Andretti				12													119	6th	
2014–15	Spark SRT01-e	SRT01-e^{1}	M	28	(United States) Scott Speed					2	Ret	12	13									119	6th	
2014–15	Spark SRT01-e	SRT01-e^{1}	M	28	(United Kingdom) Justin Wilson									10								119	6th	
2014–15	Spark SRT01-e	SRT01-e^{1}	M	28	(Switzerland) Simona de Silvestro										11	12						119	6th	
Amlin Andretti
2015–16	Spark SRT01-e	SRT01-e^{2}	M			BEI	PUT	PDE	BUE	MEX	LBH	PAR	BER	LDN								49	7th	
2015–16	Spark SRT01-e	SRT01-e^{2}	M	27	(Netherlands) Robin Frijns	10	3	10	8	5	15	7	6	Ret	Ret							49	7th	
2015–16	Spark SRT01-e	SRT01-e^{2}	M	28	(Switzerland) Simona de Silvestro	Ret	13	11	14	14	9	15	9	11	Ret							49	7th	
MS Amlin Andretti
2016–17	Spark SRT01-e	Andretti ATEC-02	M			HKG	MRK	BUE	MEX	MCO	PAR	BER		NYC		MTL						34	7th	
2016–17	Spark SRT01-e	Andretti ATEC-02	M	27	(Netherlands) Robin Frijns	6	11	14	11	12	6	17	18	9	9	8	13					34	7th	
2016–17	Spark SRT01-e	Andretti ATEC-02	M	28	(Portugal) António Félix da Costa	5	Ret	11	Ret	11	Ret	16	11	12	15	14	15					34	7th	
MS&AD Andretti Formula E
2017–18	Spark SRT01-e	Andretti ATEC-03	M			HKG		MRK	SCL	MEX	PDE	RME	PAR	BER	ZUR	NYC						24	10th	
2017–18	Spark SRT01-e	Andretti ATEC-03	M	27	(Monaco) ^{3} Kamui Kobayashi	15	17															24	10th	
2017–18	Spark SRT01-e	Andretti ATEC-03	M	27	(United Kingdom) Tom Blomqvist			8	11	15	16	15	Ret									24	10th	
2017–18	Spark SRT01-e	Andretti ATEC-03	M	27	(France) Stéphane Sarrazin									20	14	12	12					24	10th	
2017–18	Spark SRT01-e	Andretti ATEC-03	M	28	(Portugal) António Félix da Costa	6	11	14	9	7	11	11	Ret	15	8	11	15					24	10th	
BMW i Andretti Motorsport
2018–19	Spark SRT05e	BMW iFE.18	M			ADR	MRK	SCL	MEX	HKG	SYX	RME	PAR	MCO	BER	BRN	NYC					156	5th	
2018–19	Spark SRT05e	BMW iFE.18	M	27	(United Kingdom) Alexander Sims	18	4	7	14	Ret	Ret	17	Ret	13	7	11	4	2				156	5th	
2018–19	Spark SRT05e	BMW iFE.18	M	28	(Portugal) António Félix da Costa	1	Ret	Ret	2	10	3	9	7	DSQ	4	12	3	9				156	5th	
2019–20	Spark SRT05e	BMW iFE.20	M			DIR		SCL	MEX	MRK	BER		BER		BER							118	5th	
2019–20	Spark SRT05e	BMW iFE.20	M	27	(United Kingdom) Alexander Sims	8	1	Ret	5	Ret	9	19	10	13	11	13						118	5th	
2019–20	Spark SRT05e	BMW iFE.20	M	28	(Germany) Maximilian Günther	18	11	1	11	2	DSQ	Ret	1	Ret	Ret	12						118	5th	
2020–21	Spark SRT05e	BMW iFE.21	M			DIR		RME		VLC		MCO	PUE		NYC		LDN		BER	BER		157	6th	
2020–21	Spark SRT05e	BMW iFE.21	M	27	(United Kingdom) Jake Dennis	12*	Ret	Ret	13	8	1^{G}	16	5	5^{G}	Ret	16	1	9	5	Ret		157	6th	
2020–21	Spark SRT05e	BMW iFE.21	M	28	(Germany) Maximilian Günther	Ret	Ret	9	5	Ret	12	5	12	7	1	10	18	6	8	15		157	6th	
Avalanche Andretti Formula E
2021–22	Spark SRT05e	BMW iFE.21	M			DRH		MEX	RME		MCO	BER		JAK	MRK	NYC		LDN		SEO		150	6th	
2021–22	Spark SRT05e	BMW iFE.21	M	27	(United Kingdom) Jake Dennis	3	5	10	13	Ret	9	13	13	6	7	10	8	1	2	4	3	150	6th	
2021–22	Spark SRT05e	BMW iFE.21	M	28	(United States) Oliver Askew	9	11	17	14	15	15	15	15	13	11	19	Ret	4	Ret	Ret	5	150	6th	
2022–23	Formula E Gen3	Porsche 99X Electric	H			MEX	DRH		HYD	CAP	SAP	BER		MCO	JAK		POR	RME		LDN		252	3rd	
2022–23	Formula E Gen3	Porsche 99X Electric	H	27	(United Kingdom) Jake Dennis	1	2	2	16	13	Ret	18	2	3	2	2	2	4	1	2	3	252	3rd	
2022–23	Formula E Gen3	Porsche 99X Electric	H	36	(Germany) André Lotterer	4	9	12	9	9	12	8	21	Ret			19	Ret	Ret	13	21	252	3rd	
2022–23	Formula E Gen3	Porsche 99X Electric	H	36	(Germany) David Beckmann										16	Ret						252	3rd	
Andretti Formula E
2023–24	Formula E Gen3	Porsche 99X Electric	H			MEX	DIR		SAP	TOK	MIS		MCO	BER		SHA		POR		LDN		169	5th	
2023–24	Formula E Gen3	Porsche 99X Electric	H	1	(United Kingdom) Jake Dennis	9	1	12	5	3	2	2	20	Ret	5	5	11	6	10	16	Ret	169	5th	
2023–24	Formula E Gen3	Porsche 99X Electric	H	17	(France) Norman Nato	10	6	16	17	6	7	16	10	18	19	14	3	13	7	10	12	169	5th	
2024–25	Formula E Gen3 Evo	Porsche 99X Electric	H			SAP	MEX	JED		MIA	MCO		TKO		SHA		JAK	BER		LDN		141	7th	
2024–25	Formula E Gen3 Evo	Porsche 99X Electric	H	27	(United Kingdom) Jake Dennis	Ret	4	Ret	4	9	3	9	DSQ	4	17	17	17	Ret	2	8	4	141	7th	
2024–25	Formula E Gen3 Evo	Porsche 99X Electric	H	51	(Switzerland) Nico Müller	Ret	9	Ret	11	4	5	Ret	12	11	15	6	4	8	17	15	Ret	141	7th	
2025–26	Formula E Gen3 Evo	Porsche 99X Electric	H			SAP	MEX	MIA	JED		MAD	BER		MCO		SNY	SHA		TKO		LDN		229	4th
2025–26	Formula E Gen3 Evo	Porsche 99X Electric	H	27	(United Kingdom) Jake Dennis	1	5	10	9	19	6	5	6	Ret	12	1	3	13	2	3	2	18	229	4th
2025–26	Formula E Gen3 Evo	Porsche 99X Electric	H	28	(Brazil) Felipe Drugovich	12	15	18	15	12	15	13	9	4	2	5	4	6	13	16	16	13	229	4th

Notes

- ^1 – In the inaugural season, all teams were supplied with a spec powertrain by McLaren.
- ^2 – The team opted to revert to the previous McLaren motor used in the inaugural season.
- ^3 – Kobayashi, a Japanese driver, raced under a Monégasque license.
- † – Driver did not finish the race, but was classified as he completed over 90% of the race distance.
- * - Season still in progress.

=== Global RallyCross Championship ===
(key)

Global RallyCross Championship results
Year	Entrant	Car	No	Driver	1	2	3	4	5	6	7	8	9	10	11	12	GRC	Points
2014	Volkswagen Andretti Rallycross	Volkswagen Polo	34	(United States) Tanner Foust	BAR; 11	AUS; 18	DC; 5	NY; 1	CHA; 8	DAY; 6							9th	209
2014	Volkswagen Andretti Rallycross	Volkswagen Beetle	34	(United States) Tanner Foust							LA1; 8	LA2; 13	SEA; 10	LV; 6			9th	209
2014	Volkswagen Andretti Rallycross	Volkswagen Polo	77	(United States) Scott Speed	BAR; 1	AUS; 1	DC; 6	NY; 9	CHA; 5	DAY; 10	LA1; 1	LA2; 6	SEA; 6	LV; 4			3rd	344
2015	Volkswagen Andretti Rallycross	Volkswagen Beetle	34	(United States) Tanner Foust	FTA; 5	DAY1; 1	DAY2; 5	MCAS; 12	DET1; 10	DET2; 10	DC; 5	LA1; 2	LA2; 3	BAR1; 1	BAR2; 1	LV; 9	3rd	388
2015	Volkswagen Andretti Rallycross	Volkswagen Beetle	41	(United States) Scott Speed	FTA; 2	DAY1; 11	DAY2; 9	MCAS; 11	DET1; 2	DET2; 2	DC; 7	LA1; 1	LA2; 1	BAR1; 2	BAR2; 2	LV; 3	1st	456
2016	Volkswagen Andretti Rallycross	Volkswagen Beetle	34	(United States) Tanner Foust	PHO1; 1	PHO2; 1	DAL; 3	DAY1; 5	DAY2; 1	MCAS1; 8	MCAS2; C	DC; 3	AC; 4	SEA; 1	LA1; 2	LA2; 4	2nd	565
2016	Volkswagen Andretti Rallycross	Volkswagen Beetle	41	(United States) Scott Speed	PHO; 5	PHO; 2	DAL; 4	DAY1; 7	DAY2; 2	MCAS1; 1	MCAS2; C	DC; 1	AC; 1	SEA; 4	LA1; 1	LA2; 2	1st	571
2017	Volkswagen Andretti Rallycross	Volkswagen Beetle	34	(United States) Tanner Foust	MEM; 2	LOU; 4	THO1; 1	THO2; 9	OTT1; 2	OTT2; 1	INDY; 2	AC1; 10	AC2; 9	SEA1; 1	SEA2; 1	LA; 1	2nd	807
2017	Volkswagen Andretti Rallycross	Volkswagen Beetle	41	(United States) Scott Speed	MEM; 1	LOU; 3	THO1; 2	THO2; 2	OTT1; 10	OTT2; 2	INDY; 1	AC1; 1	AC2; 1	SEA1; 2	SEA2; 2	LA; 2	1st	826

=== Complete Extreme E results ===
(key)

Extreme E results
Year	Team	Car	No	Drivers	1	2	3	4	5	6	7	8	9	10	Pos.	Points
2021	Andretti United Extreme E	Spark ODYSSEY 21	23	(United Kingdom) Catie Munnings (Sweden) Timmy Hansen	DES (Saudi Arabia); 2	OCE (Senegal); 9	ARC (Greenland); 1	ISL (Italy); 6	JUR (United Kingdom); 3						4th	117
2022	Andretti United Extreme E	Spark ODYSSEY 21	23	(United Kingdom) Catie Munnings (Sweden) Timmy Hansen	DES (Saudi Arabia); 7	ISL1 (Italy); 7	ISL2 (Italy); 3	COP (Chile); 7	ENE (Uruguay); 4						7th	45
2023	Andretti Altawkilat Extreme E	Spark ODYSSEY 21	23	(United Kingdom) Catie Munnings (Sweden) Timmy Hansen	DES (Saudi Arabia); 10	DES (Saudi Arabia); 8	ISL1 (United Kingdom); 2	ISL2 (United Kingdom); 7	ENE (Italy); 5^{H}	ENE (Italy); 3	ENE (Italy); 6*	ENE (Italy); 7	COP (Chile); DNS	COP (Chile); WD	7th	71
2024	Andretti Altawkilat Extreme E	Spark ODYSSEY 21	23	(United Kingdom) Catie Munnings (Sweden) Timmy Hansen	DES (Saudi Arabia); 5	DES (Saudi Arabia); 2^{H}	HYD (United Kingdom); 3^{H}	HYD (United Kingdom); 3							4th	62
