= Mitsui Sumitomo Insurance Group =

Japanese insurance holding company

Mitsui Sumitomo Insurance Group Holdings, Inc.
- Native name: 三井住友海上グループホールディングス株式会社
- Type: Public (K.K)
- Traded as: TYO: 8725
- Industry: Insurance
- Founded: October 21, 1918 (as Taishō Marine and Fire Insurance Co.); October 2001 (merger of Mitsui Marine & Fire Insurance Co. and The Sumitomo Marine & Fire Insurance)
- Fate: Merged
- Successor: MS&AD Insurance Group
- Headquarters: Tokyo, Japan
- Area served: Worldwide
- Key people: Yoshiaki Shin, Chairman; Toshiaki Egashira, President
- Revenue: ▲JP¥ 2,137,603 million (FY 2007)
- Net income: ▲JP¥ 40,027 million (FY 2007)
- Number of employees: 20,237 (2008)
- Subsidiaries: Ceylinco Insurance (15%)
- Website: ms-ad-hd.com/en

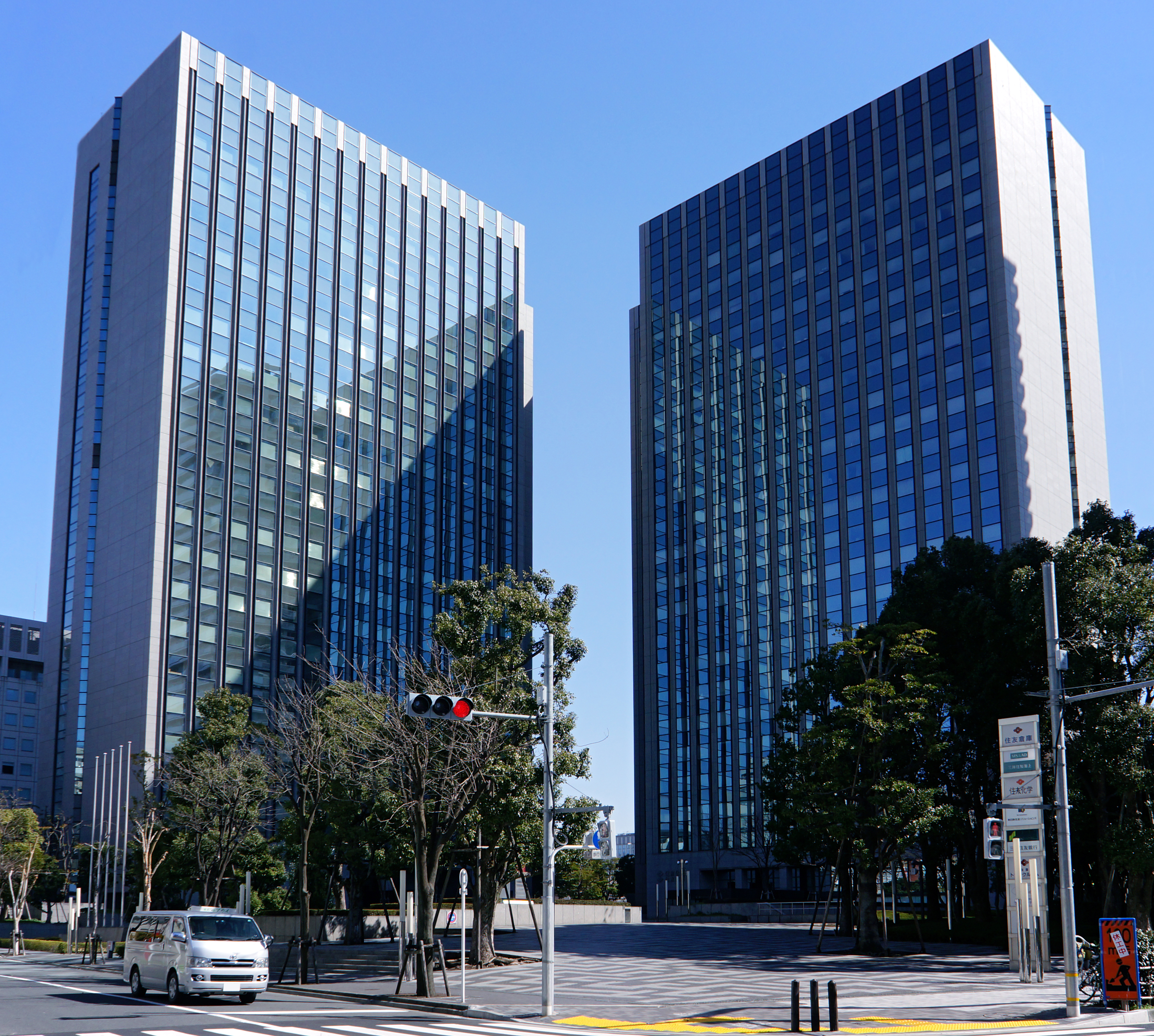
MSIG headquarters in Tokyo, Japan

Mitsui Sumitomo Insurance Group Holdings, Inc. (三井住友海上グループホールディングス株式会社, Mitsui Sumitomo Kaijō Gurūpu Hōrudingusu Kabushiki-Kaisha) was a Japanese insurance holding company headquartered in Tokyo, Japan.

MSIG was formed in 2001 from the merger of Mitsui Marine & Fire Insurance Co. (itself descended from the Taishō Marine and Fire Insurance Co. founded in 1918) and The Sumitomo Marine & Fire Insurance. In 2010, April Aioi Insurance Co., Ltd., Nissay Dowa General Insurance Co., Ltd., merged into MSIG, making the group's name changed in to MS&AD Insurance Group Holdings, Inc.. According to this business integration, MS&AD has become the largest property insurance company in Japan, with market share of 33% in 2013.

On 8 September 2015, it was announced that Mitsui Sumitomo had agreed to buy the UK insurance firm Amlin for £3.5bn.

== Group companies ==
=== Non-life insurance ===
- Mitsui Sumitomo Insurance Co

=== Life insurance ===
- Mitsui Sumitomo Kirameki Life Insurance Co
- Mitsui Sumitomo MetLife insurance Co

=== Companies not based in Japan ===
- Amlin
- Cholamandalam MS General Insurance
- MSIG Insurance Europe
- MSIG Insurance Vietnam Company
- MS Frontier Reinsurance
- MS First Capital Insurance
- Mitsui Sumitomo Reinsurance
- Mitsui Sumitomo Insurance London Management
- MSI Guaranteed Weather
- Mitsui Sumitomo Insurance
- MS Transverse Insurance

=== Financial services ===
- Sumitomo Mitsui Asset Management Co
- Venture Capital Co

=== Risk-related businesses ===
- InterRisk Research Institute & Consulting
- Mitsui Sumitomo Insurance Care Network Co
- American Appraisal Japan Co

== Annual Reports ==
- MSIG Annual Report 2008
- MSIG Annual Report 2014
