= MS&AD Insurance Group =

Japanese insurance holding company

MS&AD Insurance Group Holdings, Inc.

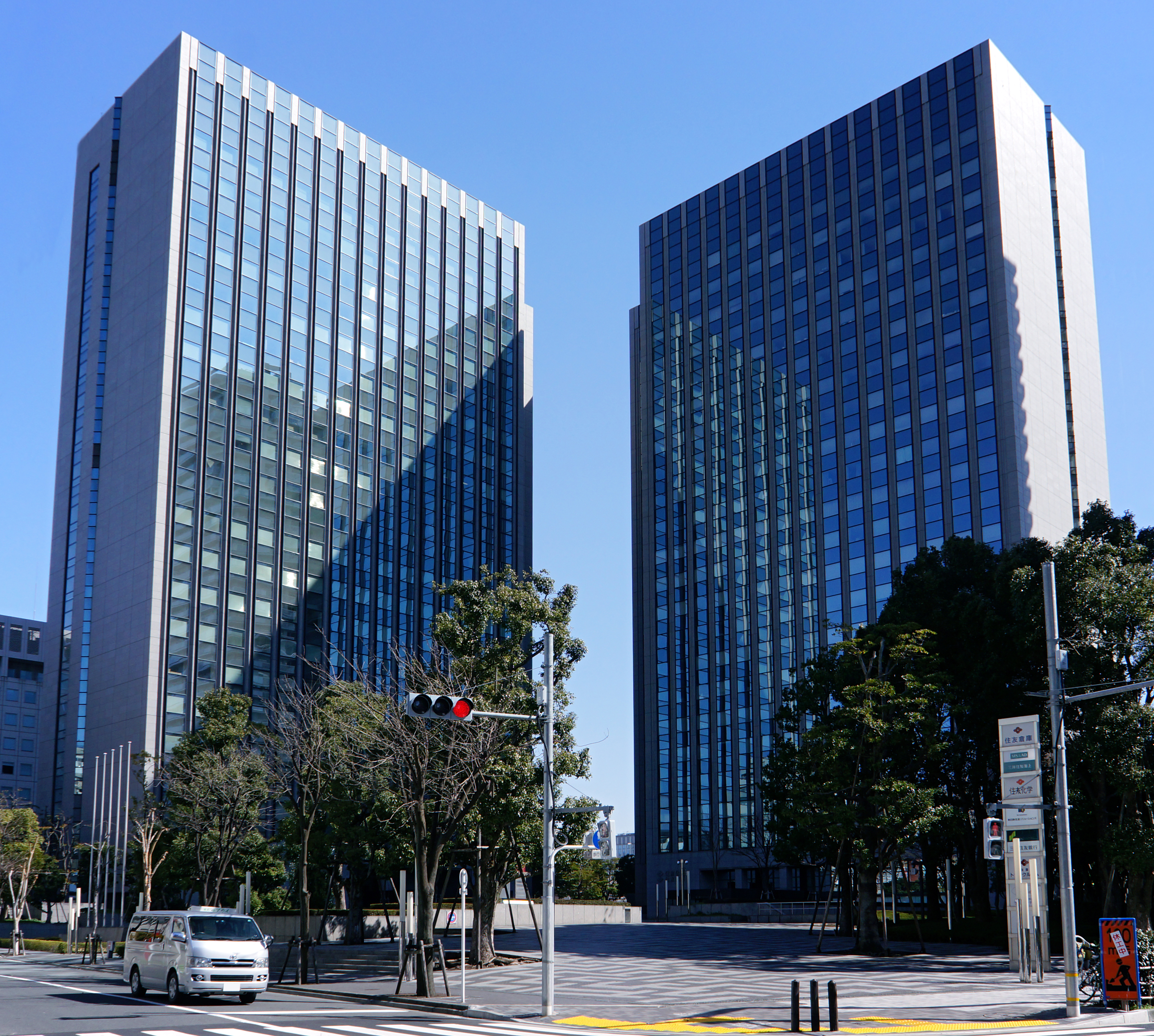
- Native name: MS&ADインシュアランスグループホールディングス株式会社
- Romanized name: Emu Esu ando Ei Dī Inshuaransu Gurūpu Horudingusu Kabushiki-gaisha
- Company type: Public KK
- Traded as: TYO: 8725
- Industry: Insurance
- Founded: 2008; 18 years ago
- Headquarters: Tokyo, Japan
- Key people: Yasuyoshi Karasawa (Chairman); Yasuzo Kanasugi (Vice Chairman); Noriyuki Hara (President and CEO)
- Revenue: JPY ¥ 5,132 billion (FY 2022)
- Net income: JPY ¥ 262.7 billion (FY 2022)
- Number of employees: 39,962 (March, 2022)
- Parent: Toyota (8.88%)
- Subsidiaries: Mitsui Sumitomo Insurance; Aioi Nissay Dowa Insurance
- Website: Official website

MS&AD Insurance Group Holdings, Inc. (MS&ADインシュアランスグループホールディングス株式会社, Emu Esu ando Ei Dī Inshuaransu Gurūpu Horudingusu Kabushiki-gaisha) (TYO: 8725) is a Japanese insurance company. Its businesses include Mitsui Sumitomo Insurance and Aioi Nissay Dowa Insurance. It is listed on the Nikkei 225.

== History ==
MS&AD Holdings, Inc.was incorporated in Apr 2008 as a holding company following; Mitsui Sumitomo Insurance Co., Ltd., Mitsui Sumitomo Kirameki Life Insurance Co., Ltd., Mitsui Sumitomo MetLife Insurance Co., Ltd. and Mitsui Direct General Insurance Co., Ltd..

In Sep 2009, MS&AD Holdings, Inc. published agreement to integrate of management between Aioi Insurance Co., Ltd., Nissay Dowa General Insurance Co., Ltd., and Mitsui Sumitomo Insurance Group Holdings, Inc..

In Apr 2010, MS&AD Holdings, Inc. was changed company name as MS&AD Insurance Group Holdings, Inc..

In Oct 2010, Aioi Insurance Co., Ltd., Nissay Dowa Insurance Co., Ltd. were integrated of management as Aioi Nissay Dowa Insurance Co., Ltd.

In Feb 2020, MS & AD Holdings announced Noriyuki Hara as its next president.
