= 2012 U.S. F2000 Winterfest =

The 2012 U.S. F2000 Cooper Tires Winterfest was the second year of the winter racing series promoted by the U.S. F2000 National Championship. It consisted of six races held during two race meets in February 2012 and served as preparation for the 2012 U.S. F2000 National Championship.

American Spencer Pigot won five of the six races on his way to dominating the championship over his closest pursuer, Cape Motorsports teammate Trent Hindman. The third Cape driver, Matthew Brabham, was the only other driver to win a race when he captured third race at Sebring and finished third in the championship. Andretti Autosport's Shelby Blackstock and JDC Motorsports' Scott Hargrove were the only other drivers to finish on the podium, with one third-place finish each as they finished fourth and sixth in the championship respectively. Andretti Autosport's Thomas McGregor finished fifth in the championship.

Canadian James Dayson won the National Class championship by one point over American Paul Alspach.

== Drivers and teams ==
The entry list for the Sebring round was announced on February 2, 2012.

Team	No.	Drivers	Notes
(United States) Cape Motorsports w/ Wayne Taylor Racing	2	(United States) Spencer Pigot	
(United States) Cape Motorsports w/ Wayne Taylor Racing	3	(United States) Trent Hindman	
(United States) Cape Motorsports w/ Wayne Taylor Racing	83	(Australia) Matthew Brabham	
(United States) Belardi Auto Racing	4	(Australia) Roman Lagudi	
(United States) Belardi Auto Racing	9	(United States) Luca Forgeois	
(United States) Belardi Auto Racing	11	(United States) Colin Thompson	
(United States) Belardi Auto Racing	14	(United States) Scott Anderson	
(United States) Pabst Racing Services	5	(Canada) Dalton Kellett	
(United States) Pabst Racing Services	6	(United States) J. R. Smart	National class
(United States) Andretti Autosport	7	(Canada) Thomas McGregor	
(United States) Andretti Autosport	8	(United States) Shelby Blackstock	
(Canada) Dayson Racing	12	(Canada) James Dayson	National class
(United States) ArmsUp Motorsports	15	(United States) Luigi Biangardi	Sebring only
(United States) JDC Motorsports	19	(United States) Neil Alberico	
(United States) JDC Motorsports	38	(Canada) Scott Hargrove	
(United States) JDC Motorsports	54	(United States) Michael Johnson	
(United States) JDC Motorsports	93	(United States) Zac Silver	
(United States) JAY Motorsports	23	(United States) Jason Wolfe	
(Canada) MDL Racing	33	(Canada) Matthew Di Leo	
(United States) Robinson Motor Sports	97	(United States) Paul Alspach	National class; Sebring only

== Race calendar and results ==
The race schedule was announced on November 2, 2011.

Rnd	Circuit	Location	Date	Pole position	Fastest lap	Most laps led	Winning driver	Winning team
1	Sebring Raceway	Sebring, Florida	February 6	(United States) Spencer Pigot	(United States) Trent Hindman	(United States) Spencer Pigot	(United States) Spencer Pigot	(United States) Cape Motorsports
2	Sebring Raceway	Sebring, Florida	February 7	(United States) Trent Hindman	(Australia) Matthew Brabham	(United States) Spencer Pigot	(United States) Spencer Pigot	(United States) Cape Motorsports
3	Sebring Raceway	Sebring, Florida	February 7	(Australia) Matthew Brabham	(Australia) Matthew Brabham	(Australia) Matthew Brabham	(Australia) Matthew Brabham	(United States) Cape Motorsports
4	Palm Beach International Raceway	Jupiter, Florida	February 11	(United States) Spencer Pigot	(United States) Spencer Pigot	(United States) Spencer Pigot	(United States) Spencer Pigot	(United States) Cape Motorsports
5	Palm Beach International Raceway	Jupiter, Florida	February 12	(United States) Spencer Pigot	(United States) Spencer Pigot	(United States) Spencer Pigot	(United States) Spencer Pigot	(United States) Cape Motorsports
6	Palm Beach International Raceway	Jupiter, Florida	February 12	(United States) Spencer Pigot	(United States) Spencer Pigot	(United States) Spencer Pigot	(United States) Spencer Pigot	(United States) Cape Motorsports

== Championship standings ==
=== Drivers' Championship ===
Pos	Driver	SEB			PBI			Points
Championship Class
1	(United States) Spencer Pigot	**1***	1*	2	**1***	**1***	**1***	187
2	(United States) Trent Hindman	3	**3**	3	2	2	3	140
3	(Australia) Matthew Brabham	2	2	**1***	4	14	2	135
4	(United States) Shelby Blackstock	5	7	5	7	3	4	103
5	(Canada) Thomas McGregor	17	4	8	6	4	8	83
6	(Canada) Scott Hargrove	7	9	15	3	9	6	81
7	(United States) Neil Alberico	15	11	10	5	5	5	78
8	(United States) Scott Anderson	4	14	11	12	7	7	73
9	(Canada) Matthew Di Leo	6	5	4	14	16	10	70
10	(Australia) Roman Lagudi	11	8	7	8	6	14	66
11	(Canada) Dalton Kellett	10	12	14	13	10	11	56
12	(United States) Jason Wolfe	13	10	12	11	11	15	49
13	(United States) Zac Silver	9	13	13	10	13	DNS	47
14	(United States) Luigi Biangardi	8	6	6				43
15	(United States) Luca Forgeois	18	DNS	DNS	9	8	12	35
16	(United States) Colin Thompson	16	15	9	DSQ	DNS	9	35
17	(United States) Michael Johnson	12	16	16	15	15	13	34
National Class
1	(Canada) James Dayson	19	DNS	DNS	17	12	DNS	45
2	(United States) Paul Alspach	DNS	17	17				44
3	(United States) J. R. Smart	14	18	DNS	DNS	DNS	DNS	40
Pos	Driver	SEB			PBI			Points

Color	Result
Gold	Winner
Silver	2nd place
Bronze	3rd place
Green	4th & 5th place
Light Blue	6th–10th place
Dark Blue	Finished (Outside Top 10)
Purple	Did not finish
Red	Did not qualify (DNQ)
Brown	Withdrawn (Wth)
Black	Disqualified (DSQ)
White	Did not start (DNS)
Blank	Did not participate

**In-line notation** Championship Class only
**Bold**	Pole position (1 point)
Italics	Ran fastest race lap (1 point)
*	Led most race laps (1 point)

=== Teams' Championship ===
Pos	Team	Points
1	(United States) Cape Motorsports w/ Wayne Taylor Racing	240
2	(United States) Andretti Autosport	100
3	(United States) JDC Motorsports	68
4	(United States) Belardi Auto Racing	54
5	(Canada) MDL Racing	33
6	(United States) ArmsUp Motorsports	20
7	(United States) Pabst Racing Services	8
8	(United States) JAY Motorsports	6
9	(Canada) Dayson Racing	3

== See also ==
- 2012 IndyCar Series season
