= Jacob Wilson (racing driver) =

American racing driver (born 1990)

Jacob Wilson (born March 17, 1990, in Crawfordsville, Indiana) is an American racing driver.

== Early life ==
Wilson began speedway karting in 2003. Between 2003 and 2006, Wilson claimed two championships, along with seven second-place and one third-place finishes in the standings across several World Karting Association divisions.

== Sprint Car & Silver Crown Racing ==
Between 2005 and 2007, Wilson competed in several USAC midget races, with six top-ten finishes over that period.

In 2008, Wilson entered his first USAC Sprint Car and Silver Crown Series races. He claimed his first USAC National Sprint Car win that year at Salem Speedway at the Joe James/Pat O'Connor Memorial Race. His best Silver Crown finish that year was 5th at the Copper World Classic at Phoenix International Raceway.

In 2009, Wilson ran a partial schedule with the USAC National Sprint Car and Silver Crown series, where he finished 21st in sprint car points and 16th in Silver Crown points. In ten races on paved tracks, he recorded three top-five and six top-ten finishes, including a second place sprint car finish at Toledo Speedway and a third place sprint car finish at Salem Speedway.

The 2010 season saw Wilson running a lighter schedule, however he did record a top-ten finish in both USAC sprint car and Silver Crown races.

In 2011, Wilson ran his heaviest schedule thus far, with races in the USAC National Midget Series, Sprint Car, and Silver Crown series, as well as the Must See Racing pavement sprint car series. In eight USAC sprint car and Silver Crown races that year, Wilson had two top-five and seven top-ten finishes.

Between 2012 and 2014, Wilson recorded several wins in winged pavement sprint car series including King of the Wing, Auto Value Super Sprints, and Must See Racing, and finished second in the 2012 Must See Racing point standings. Wilson had an exceptionally good year in 2013 where he claimed three wins with the Must See Racing series and had top-ten finishes in every race he entered but one, where he experienced mechanical issues while running in the top-ten at Anderson Speedway.

The 2014 season was the first year Wilson began venturing into dirt racing, entering Silver Crown races at tracks such as the Terre Haute Action Track, Indiana State Fairgrounds, Belleville High Banks, Illinois State Fairgrounds, and Eldora Speedway.

Wilson began the 2015 season in strong form with five top-fives and eight top-tens in his first nine races, primarily on pavement. In the second half of the season, Wilson switched focus to his dirt program, including the addition of several 410 winged sprint car dates.

In 2016, Wilson significantly expanded his schedule on dirt, running numerous sprint car and USAC Silver Crown dates.

== Indy Lights ==
Wilson made his Firestone Indy Lights debut in the series at the Kentucky Speedway on October 2, 2011, driving for Belardi Auto Racing. He started third, but spun on the opening lap. He also raced in the season finale at Las Vegas Motor Speedway where he started tenth and finished fifth. Despite only competing in two races in the 2011 Firestone Indy Lights season, he was voted Most Popular Driver.

== Little 500 ==
Wilson won the prestigious PayLess Little 500 at Anderson Speedway back-to-back in 2013 & 2014, and has recorded six top-five and seven top-ten finishes in eleven starts.

== Motorsports career results ==
(key)

=== Indy Lights ===
Year	Team	1	2	3	4	5	6	7	8	9	10	11	12	13	14	Rank	Points
2011	Belardi Auto Racing	STP	ALA	LBH	INDY	MIL	IOW	TOR	EDM	EDM	TRO	NHM	BAL	KTY; 9	LVS; 5	22nd	52

=== Little 500 ===
Year	Start	Finish	Status
2008	15	30	Wrecked
2009	5	4	Running
2010	9	5	Running
2011	9	21	Oil Pressure
2012	22	19	-
2013	9	1	Running
2014	5	1	Running
2015	4	4	Running
2016	8	26	Wrecked
2017	5	9	Running
2018	5	2	Running

=== World of Outlaws ===
Year	Races	Features	Wins	Top 5	Top 10	Rank	Points
2014	2	1	0	0	0	228th	191
2015	1	1	0	0	0	286th	112
2016	6	1	0	0	0	100th	566
2017	4	0	0	0	0	174th	270

=== All Star Circuit of Champions ===
Year	Races	Features	Wins	Top 5	Top 10	Rank	Points
2016	12	1	0	0	0	41st	908
2017	11	3	0	0	0	46th	1114

=== USAC Silver Crown ===
Year	Races	Features	Wins	Top 5	Top 10	Rank	Points
2008	4	4	0	1	0		
2009	5	5	0	0	2		
2010	4	4	0	1	2		
2011	3	3	0	1	2		
2012	4	4	0	1	10		
2013	2	2	0	1	1		
2014	9	9	0	0	4	7th	306
2015	8	8	0	1	3	13th	223
2016	5	5	0	0	1	15th	181
2017	3	2	0	0	0	38th	86
2018	2	2	0	0	1	23rd*	88*

=== USAC Sprint Car ===
Year	Races	Wins	Top 5	Top 10	Rank	Points
2009	5	0	3	5		
2010	7	0	0	3		
2011	5	0	1	5		
2015	1	0	1	1		

=== MOWA Sprint Car ===
Year	Races	Wins	Top 5	Top 10	Rank	Points
2016	7	0	0	4		
2017	2	0	0	0	41st	100

=== Must See Racing ===
Year	Races	Wins	Top 5	Top 10	Rank	Points
2010	8	0	1	0	17th	133
2011	10	0	2	2	12th	602
2012	13	0	9	13	2nd	985
2013	12	3	6	11	4th	759
2014	9	1	3	7	7th	526
2015	4	0	3	4		
