= Heamin Choi =

South Korean racing driver

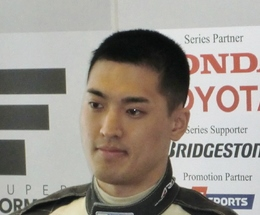
- Choi in 2013
- Born: January 11, 1984 (age 42) Busan, South Korea

Previous series
- 2016 2015 2014 2013 2012 2009, 2010 2007 2006 2004, 2005 2002, 2003 2001 2000 1999: Indy Lights Championship; Indy Lights Championship; Korean Le Mans Series; Super Race; USF2000 National Championship; Super Race; Pro Mazda Championship; Korea GT Championship; BAT Championship Formula Korea; BAT Championship Formula 1800; NTC PRD Kart race NTC Freshman Kart Race; Carman Park Cup Kart Grand Prix

Championship titles
- 2013 2006 2005: Super Race GT; Korea GT Championship GT1; Formula Korea

Awards
- 2012 2003: KMA Global Driver of the Year; KARA Rookie of the Year

Heamin Choi (born January 11, 1984) is a Korean race car driver. He is the first Korean driver to race in the American Open Wheel Series (Pro Mazda, USF2000), and the first Korean driver to participate in any race held in the United States. He has won the 2005 BAT Championship (Formula Korea), 2006 Korea GT championship (GT1), and 2013 Super Race GT driver's title. He was also the Samsung Everland scholarship driver through year 2003 to 2005. In 2016, Choi participated in IndyLights.

== Early career ==
Choi's racing career started at the age of fifteen with his debut at the 1999 Carman Park Kart Grand Prix. Also in 1999, he entered the team Redstone under Hong Suk Cho, the team director. He finished fourth at his second race. In 2000, he finished second in the Japan New Tokyo Circuit Freshman Kart Race Time Trial. By winning five times in the Korean Kart series, he started gaining attention as a Kart prodigy in the Korean motorsport community. Choi gained more experience in riding kart at various track with different conditions such as wet and street track. However, in early 2001, he was injured on his left rib at the Japanese Kart race which had forced him to temporarily stop kart races with high g-force.

== 2001–2006 ==
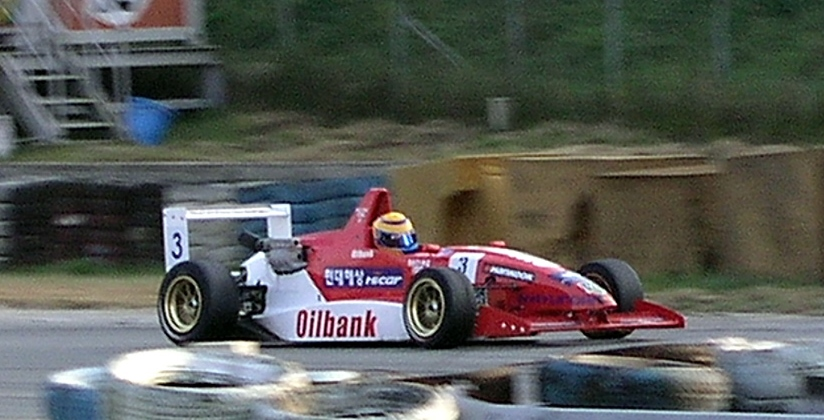
Heamin Choi Formula Korea

In 2001, Choi joined Hankook Tire's Ventus Motor Sports team, which run formula cars, touring cars, and off-road rallycross cars. He was trained by Myung Mok Lee, who is known as the champion of the Korea Touring Car Championship. In the team, Choi was given the role to test in Formula 1800.
In 2002, Choi marked his debut for the pro formula race in Korea, finishing sixth in his first race qualification and sixth in championship. In 2003, Choi was selected as the Samsung Everland Speedway Scholarship driver for the first time and finished fifth at the BAT Championship (Formula 1800). In 2004, Choi joined the Hyundai Oilbank racing team finishing as a runner-up in the Formula Korea championship. In 2005, Choi won the driver's championship title of BAT Championship (Formula Korea). In 2006, he moved to Grand Touring Race after achieving the Formula Korea Championship. Despite the difficulty in adapting to the GT car from Formula car, Choi won the championship for GT1 Class.

== 2007 ==
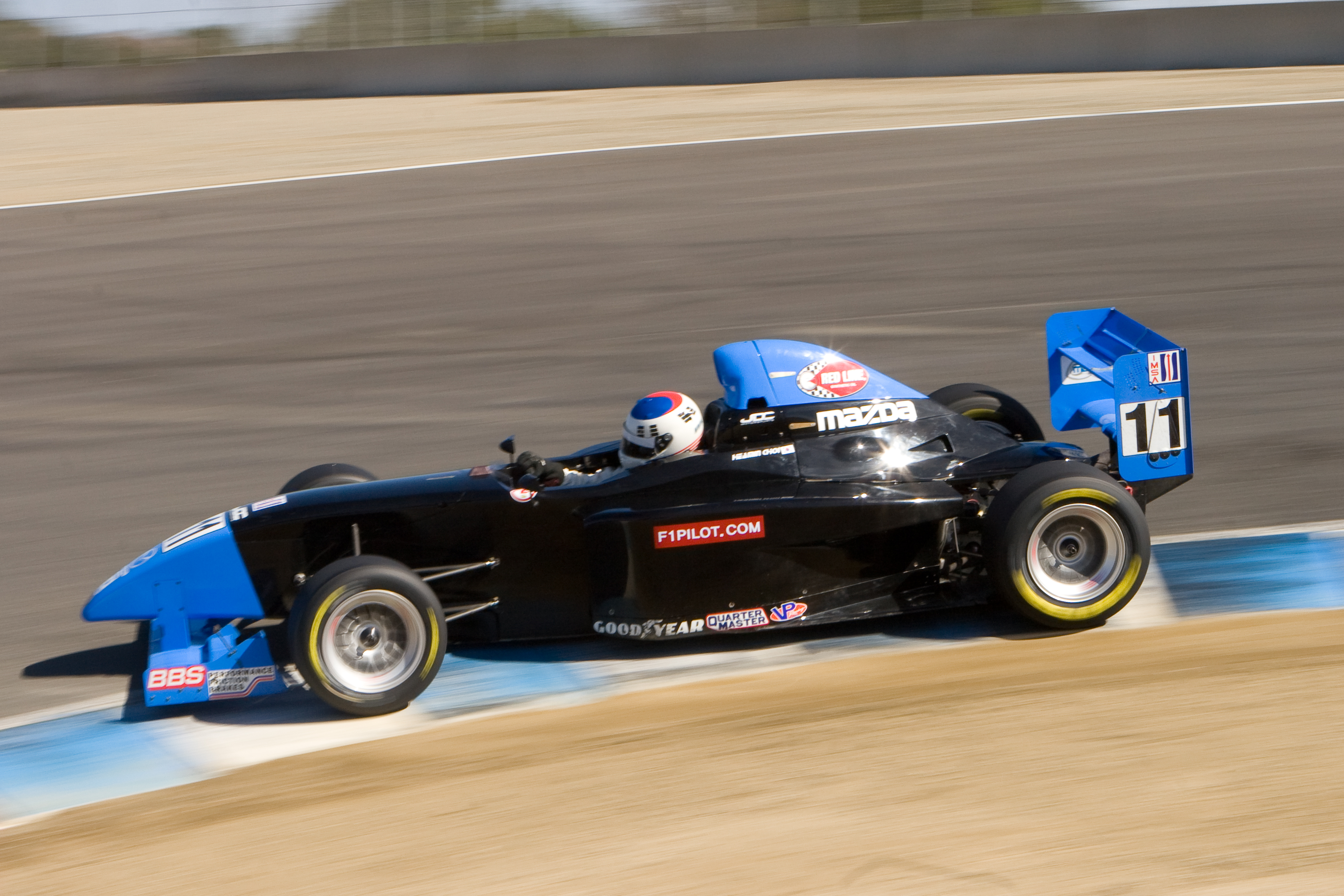
Heamin Choi Pro Mazda

After Choi won two championship titles in a row, he turned his attention to international competitions. He participated in IMSA Star Mazda Championship (Pro Mazda Championship) at Laguna Seca Race with JDC Motorsports. Choi finished 19th in the race, passing nine cars during the race.

== 2009–2011 ==
In 2009, Choi participated in the Korean Stock Car race and finished 4th. In 2010 he joined the Atlas BX racing team as a touring car driver and finished fourth in the 2010 F1 Korean GP support race.

== 2012 ==
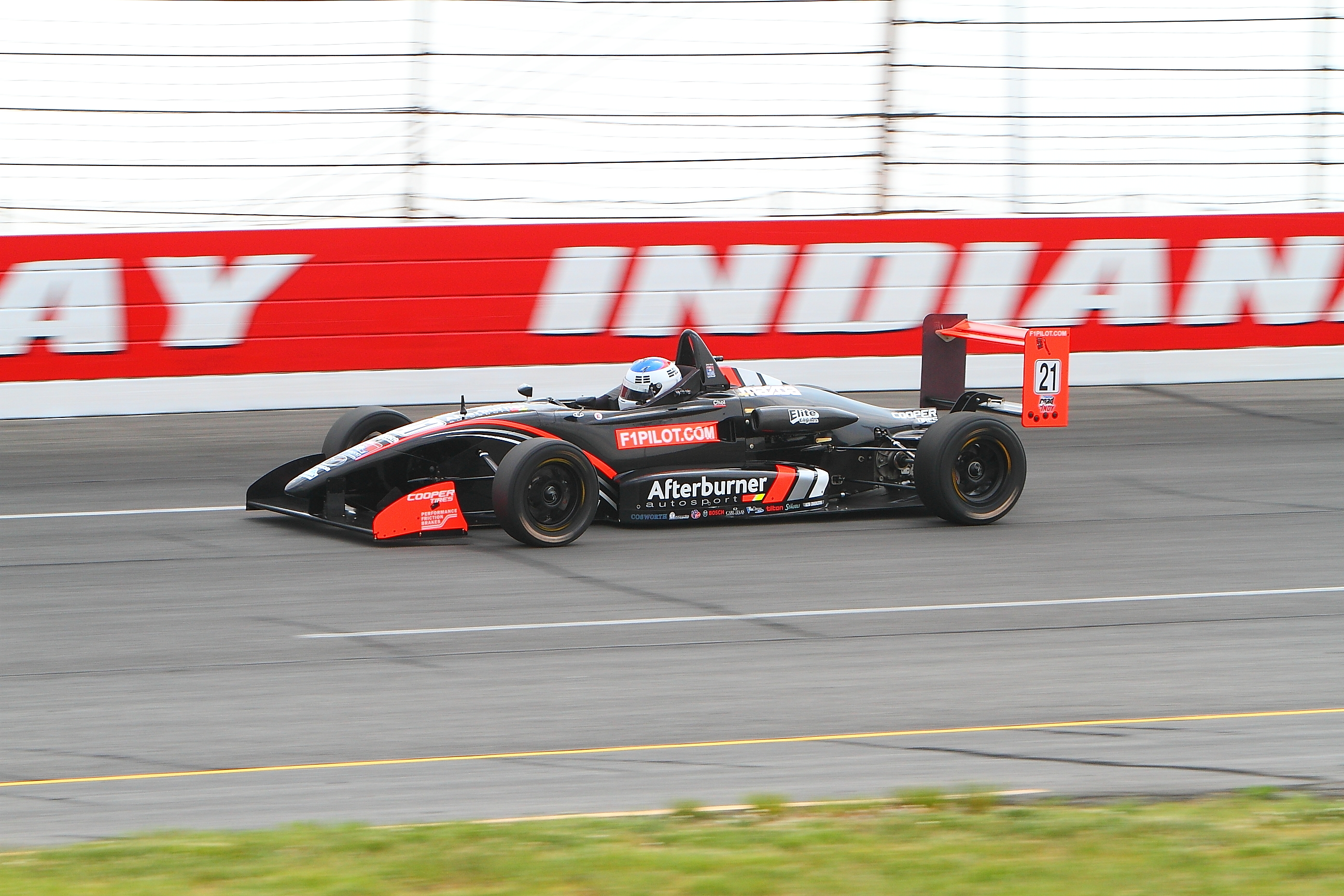
Heamin Choi USF2000

In 2012, Choi participated in the Cooper Tires USF2000 Championship. Choi finished ninth in his second event at St. Petersburg and with his continuous progress, he was ranked sixth in his first qualifying at the Lucas Oil Raceway in Indianapolis.

== 2013 ==
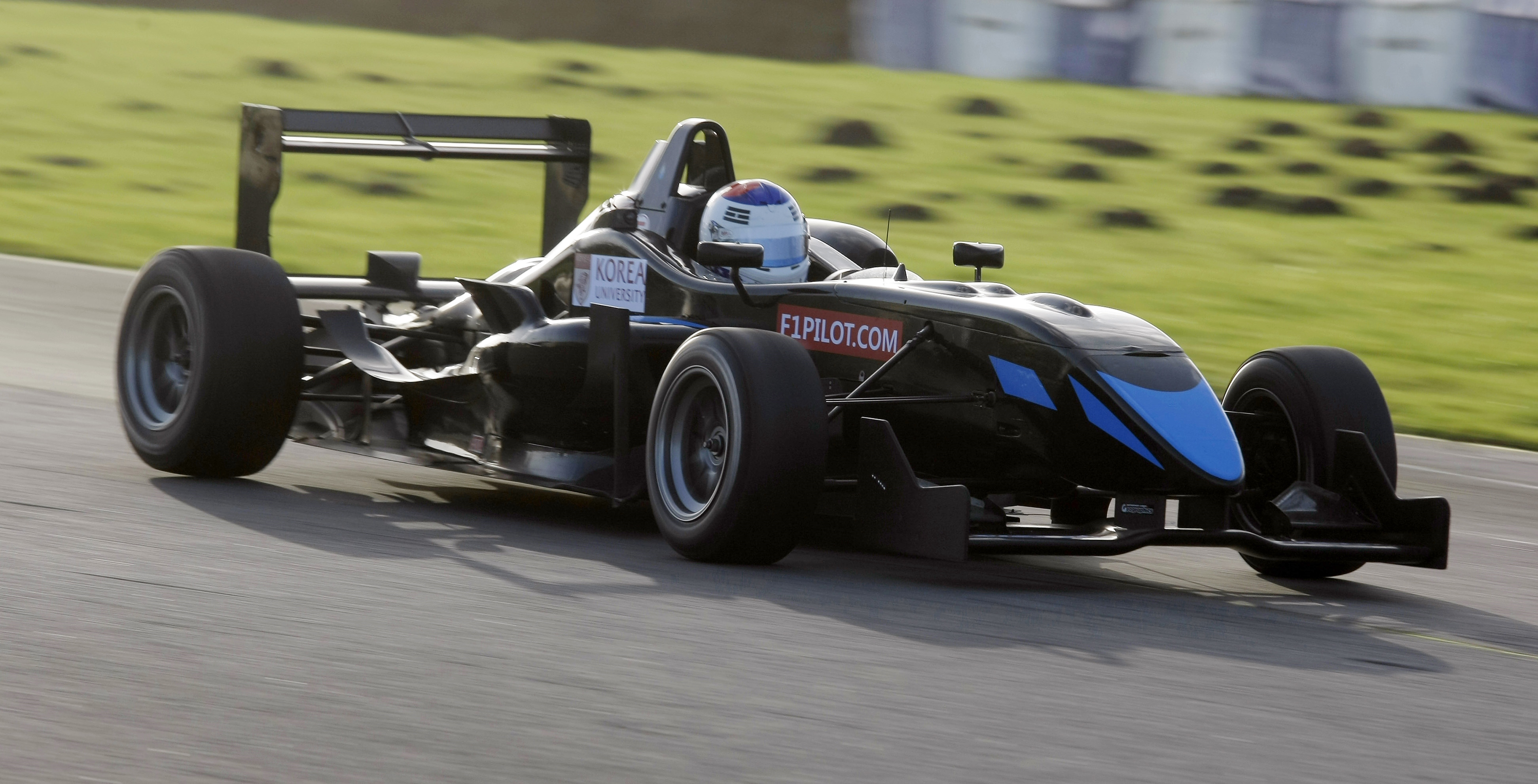
Heamin Choi Formula 3

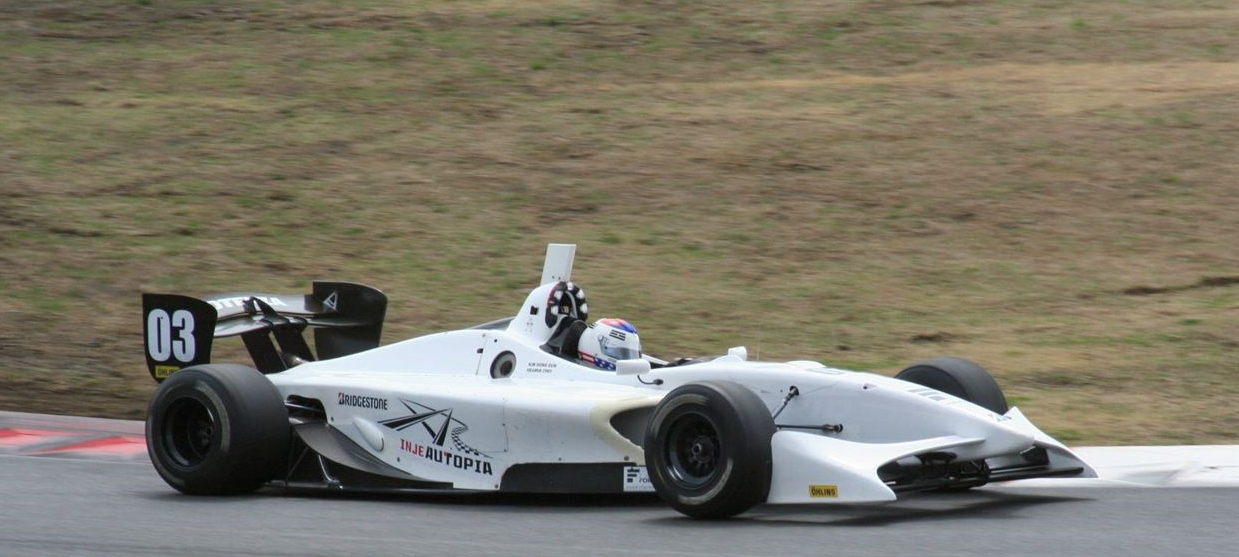
Heamin Choi Super Formula

In 2013, Choi took part in the Formula 3 test with Double R racing in England and in the Super Formula pre-season testing at Fuji Speedway in Japan. However, the sponsor company was in the trouble of operating its race track in Korea which left Choi unable to compete in Super Formula series. Therefore, Choi decided to race in Korean GT championship and achieved Driver's Title.

== 2014 ==
In 2014, Choi participated in the first Korean Le Mans series and won the race with his Korean stock car.

== 2015–2016 ==
In 2015, Choi came back to the US to participate in the Indy Lights series. He finished eleventh in his debut event at Laguna Seca. In 2016, Choi participated in all oval races of the season in Indy Lights. He finished in the top-ten at Iowa Speedway and twelfth at Laguna Seca.

== Racing record ==
=== American open-wheel racing results ===
==== U.S. F2000 National Championship ====
Year	Team	1	2	3	4	5	6	7	8	9	10	11	12	13	14	Rank	Points
2012	Afterburner Autosport	SEB; 16	SEB; 18	STP; 10	STP; 12	LOR; 15	MOH; 26	MOH; 15	ROA; 12	ROA; 27	ROA; 12	BAL	BAL	VIR	VIR	17th	55

==== Indy Lights ====
Year	Team	1	2	3	4	5	6	7	8	9	10	11	12	13	14	15	16	17	18	Rank	Points	Ref
2015	Schmidt Peterson Motorsports	STP	STP	LBH	ALA	ALA	IMS	IMS	INDY	TOR	TOR	MIL	IOW	MOH	MOH	LAG; 12	LAG; 11			16th	19	
2016	Schmidt Peterson Motorsports	STP	STP	PHX; 16	ALA	ALA	IMS	IMS	INDY; 12	RDA	RDA	IOW; 10	TOR	TOR	MOH	MOH	WGL	LAG; 15	LAG; 12	18th	40	
2018	Juncos Racing	STP	STP	ALA	ALA	IMS	IMS	INDY	RDA	RDA	IOW	TOR	TOR	MOH	MOH	GTW	POR; 8	POR; 6		10th	28	
