= Scott Anderson (racing driver) =

American racing driver

- Nationality: American
- Born: February 18, 1990 (age 36) Fort Collins, Colorado, U.S.

Previous series
- 2016–2017 2014–2016 2013 2012: GRC Lites; Indy Lights; Pro Mazda Championship; U.S. F2000 National Championship

Scott Anderson (born February 18, 1990) is an American racing driver from Fort Collins, Colorado.

Anderson began racing karts in the Colorado Sprint Championship. He made the move to cars in Sports Car Club of America Spec Racer Ford. In 2010, he made his professional debut in U.S. F2000 National Championship. In 2011, he won the Skip Barber National Championship and a scholarship for a full season of U.S. F2000 in 2012 where he finished third with two wins for Belardi Auto Racing.

In 2013, Anderson moved up the Road to Indy and raced in the Pro Mazda Championship for Juncos Racing; finished fifth in points with one podium and seven top-fives. In 2014 Anderson progressed to Indy Lights with Fan Force United, which returned to the series after a one-year hiatus. Anderson finished eighth in points with a best finish of fourth at the Milwaukee Mile. In 2015 he returned to the series, driving for Schmidt Peterson Motorsports. In 2016, he began racing in Red Bull Global Rallycross Lites with CORE Autosport beginning in Seattle. In the final race of 2016, he finished in second place behind eventual series champion, Cabot Bigham.

From 2017 to 2019, Anderson raced in Americas Rallycross (ARX).

== Racing record ==
=== SCCA National Championship Runoffs ===
Year	Track	Car	Engine	Class	Finish	Start	Status
2009	Road America	Spec Racer	Ford	Spec Racer Ford	37	11	Retired

=== U.S. F2000 National Championship ===
Year	Team	1	2	3	4	5	6	7	8	9	10	11	12	13	14	Rank	Points
2012	Belardi Auto Racing	SEB; 5	SEB; 8	STP; 28	STP; 10	LOR; 4	MOH; 2	MOH; 1	ROA; 3	ROA; 2	ROA; 1	BAL; 5	BAL; 2	VIR; 26	VIR; 6	3rd	256

=== Pro Mazda Championship ===
Year	Team	1	2	3	4	5	6	7	8	9	10	11	12	13	14	15	16	Rank	Points
2013	Juncos Racing	AUS; 6	AUS; 4	STP; 8	STP; 7	IND; 5	IOW; 5	TOR; 10	TOR; 9	MOS; 4	MOS; 2	MOH; 16	MOH; 6	TRO; 4	TRO; 4	HOU; 6	HOU; 7	5th	245

=== Indy Lights ===
Year	Team	1	2	3	4	5	6	7	8	9	10	11	12	13	14	15	16	17	18	Rank	Points
2014	Fan Force United	STP; 12	LBH; 9	ALA; 12	ALA; 10	IND; 7	IND; 5	INDY; 9	POC; 6	TOR; 9	MOH; 8	MOH; 9	MIL; 4	SNM; 8	SNM; 10					8th	309
2015	Schmidt Peterson Motorsports	STP; 7	STP; 10	LBH; 6	ALA; 11	ALA; 5	IMS; 6	IMS; 9	INDY; 3	TOR; 9	TOR; 10	MIL; 5	IOW; 6	MOH; 7	MOH; 8	LAG; 9	LAG; 13			9th	219
2016	Schmidt Peterson Motorsports	STP; 13	STP; 9	PHX	ALA; 10	ALA; 13	IMS; 12	IMS; 8	INDY	RDA	RDA	IOW	TOR	TOR	MOH	MOH	WGL	LAG	LAG	17th	61

=== Complete Global Rallycross results ===
==== GRC Lites ====
Year	Entrant	Car	1	2	3	4	5	6	7	8	9	10	11	12	GRC	Points
2016	CORE Autosport	Lites Ford Fiesta	PHO1	PHO2	DAL	DAY1	DAY2	MCAS1	MCAS2; C	DC	AC	SEA; 11	LA1; 12	LA2; 2	16th	55
2017	Olsbergs MSE X Forces	Lites Ford Fiesta	MEM	LOU	THO1	THO2	OTT1	OTT2	INDY	AC1; 6	AC2; 7	SEA1; 7	SEA1; 5	LA; 5	11th	242

== Arrest & Charges ==
In 2026 Anderson was arrested and charged with Sexual Assault of a Child in the 1st Degree in Douglas County, Nebraska. He was booked into the Douglas Country Department of Corrections Jail on the 23rd of June. During his initial appearance on June 25th, Anderson chose to waive his right to a preliminary hearing and was denied bond.
