= 2018 Indy Lights =

Motor racing season

2018 Indy Lights season
- Indy Lights

Season
- Races: 17
- Start date: March 10
- End date: September 2

Awards
- Drivers' champion: (Mexico) Patricio O'Ward
- Teams' champion: (United States) Andretti Autosport
- Rookie of the Year: (Mexico) Patricio O'Ward

The 2018 Indy Lights season was the 33rd season of the Indy Lights open wheel motor racing series and the 17th sanctioned by IndyCar, acting as the primary support series for the IndyCar Series. A 17-race schedule was announced on October 17, 2017.

Patricio O'Ward dueled the entire season with his Andretti Autosport teammate Colton Herta, ultimately clinching the title by winning the penultimate race of the season. O'Ward had nine wins with four other podium finishes while Herta captured four consecutive wins in the first half of the season, including the Freedom 100, but also finished second seven times. Belardi Auto Racing's Santiago Urrutia captured two race wins and finished third in the championship. Andretti's Ryan Norman and Juncos Racing's Victor Franzoni each had a single win and finished fourth and fifth in the championship respectively. There were only seven full-time entries. Andretti Autosport soundly won the team championship.

== Team and driver chart ==
Team	No.	Drivers	Rounds
Andretti Autosport	27	(Mexico) Patricio O'Ward	All
Andretti Autosport	28	(Canada) Dalton Kellett	All
Andretti Autosport	48	(United States) Ryan Norman	All
Andretti Steinbrenner Racing	98	(United States) Colton Herta	All
Belardi Auto Racing	5	(Uruguay) Santiago Urrutia	All
Belardi Auto Racing	9	(United States) Aaron Telitz	All
Juncos Racing	7	(Mexico) Alfonso Celis Jr.	3–4
Juncos Racing	7	(South Korea) Heamin Choi	16–17
Juncos Racing	23	(Brazil) Victor Franzoni	All
Team Pelfrey	2	(United States) Neil Alberico	1–2
Team Pelfrey	2	(United States) Davey Hamilton Jr.	7
Team Pelfrey	3	(United States) Shelby Blackstock	1–2

== Schedule ==
Rd.	Date	Race name	Track	Location
1	March 10	(United States) St. Petersburg 100	Streets of St. Petersburg	St. Petersburg, Florida
2	March 11	(United States) St. Petersburg 100	Streets of St. Petersburg	St. Petersburg, Florida
3	April 21	(United States) Legacy Indy Lights 100	Barber Motorsports Park	Birmingham, Alabama
4	April 22	(United States) Legacy Indy Lights 100	Barber Motorsports Park	Birmingham, Alabama
5	May 11	(United States) Grand Prix of Indianapolis	Indianapolis Motor Speedway road course	Speedway, Indiana
6	May 12	(United States) Grand Prix of Indianapolis	Indianapolis Motor Speedway road course	Speedway, Indiana
7	May 25	(United States) Freedom 100	Indianapolis Motor Speedway oval	Speedway, Indiana
8	June 23	(United States) Mazda Grand Prix of Road America	Road America	Elkhart Lake, Wisconsin
9	June 24	(United States) Mazda Grand Prix of Road America	Road America	Elkhart Lake, Wisconsin
10	July 8	(United States) Mazda Iowa 100	Iowa Speedway	Newton, Iowa
11	July 14	(Canada) Grand Prix of Toronto	Exhibition Place	Toronto, Ontario, Canada
12	July 15	(Canada) Grand Prix of Toronto	Exhibition Place	Toronto, Ontario, Canada
13	July 28	(United States) Grand Prix of Mid-Ohio	Mid-Ohio Sports Car Course	Lexington, Ohio
14	July 29	(United States) Grand Prix of Mid-Ohio	Mid-Ohio Sports Car Course	Lexington, Ohio
15	August 25	(United States) Illinois 100	Gateway Motorsports Park	Madison, Illinois
16	September 1	(United States) Grand Prix of Portland	Portland International Raceway	Portland, Oregon
17	September 2	(United States) Grand Prix of Portland	Portland International Raceway	Portland, Oregon

== Race results ==
Round	Race	Pole position	Fastest lap	Most laps led	Race Winner	
Round	Race	Pole position	Fastest lap	Most laps led	Driver	Team
1	St. Petersburg 1	(United States) Aaron Telitz	(United States) Colton Herta	(Mexico) Patricio O'Ward	(Mexico) Patricio O'Ward	Andretti Autosport
2	St. Petersburg 2	(Mexico) Patricio O'Ward	(Mexico) Patricio O'Ward	(Mexico) Patricio O'Ward	(Uruguay) Santiago Urrutia	Belardi Auto Racing
3	Birmingham 1	(United States) Colton Herta	(United States) Colton Herta	(Mexico) Patricio O'Ward	(Mexico) Patricio O'Ward	Andretti Autosport
4	Birmingham 2	(Mexico) Patricio O'Ward	(Mexico) Patricio O'Ward	(Mexico) Patricio O'Ward	(Mexico) Patricio O'Ward	Andretti Autosport
5	Indianapolis GP 1	(Mexico) Patricio O'Ward	(United States) Colton Herta	(United States) Colton Herta (Uruguay) Santiago Urrutia	(United States) Colton Herta	Andretti Steinbrenner Racing
6	Indianapolis GP 2	(Mexico) Patricio O'Ward	(Brazil) Victor Franzoni	(Uruguay) Santiago Urrutia	(United States) Colton Herta	Andretti Steinbrenner Racing
7	Indianapolis	(Canada) Dalton Kellett	(United States) Davey Hamilton Jr.	(Canada) Dalton Kellett	(United States) Colton Herta	Andretti Steinbrenner Racing
8	Road America 1	(Brazil) Victor Franzoni	(United States) Colton Herta	(United States) Colton Herta	(United States) Colton Herta	Andretti Steinbrenner Racing
9	Road America 2	(Mexico) Patricio O'Ward	(Brazil) Victor Franzoni	(Brazil) Victor Franzoni	(Brazil) Victor Franzoni	Juncos Racing
10	Iowa	(Mexico) Patricio O'Ward	(Brazil) Victor Franzoni	(Mexico) Patricio O'Ward	(Mexico) Patricio O'Ward	Andretti Autosport
11	Toronto 1	(United States) Colton Herta	(United States) Colton Herta	(Mexico) Patricio O'Ward	(Mexico) Patricio O'Ward	Andretti Autosport
12	Toronto 2	(Uruguay) Santiago Urrutia	(United States) Aaron Telitz	(Uruguay) Santiago Urrutia	(Uruguay) Santiago Urrutia	Belardi Auto Racing
13	Mid-Ohio 1	(Mexico) Patricio O'Ward	(United States) Colton Herta	(Mexico) Patricio O'Ward	(Mexico) Patricio O'Ward	Andretti Autosport
14	Mid-Ohio 2	(Mexico) Patricio O'Ward	(United States) Colton Herta	(Mexico) Patricio O'Ward	(Mexico) Patricio O'Ward	Andretti Autosport
15	Gateway	(United States) Colton Herta	(United States) Ryan Norman	(United States) Colton Herta	(United States) Ryan Norman	Andretti Autosport
16	Portland 1	(Mexico) Patricio O'Ward	(Mexico) Patricio O'Ward	(Mexico) Patricio O'Ward	(Mexico) Patricio O'Ward	Andretti Autosport
17	Portland 2	(United States) Ryan Norman	(Mexico) Patricio O'Ward	(Mexico) Patricio O'Ward	(Mexico) Patricio O'Ward	Andretti Autosport

== Championship standings ==
=== Drivers' Championship ===
Scoring system

Position	**1st**	**2nd**	**3rd**	**4th**	**5th**	**6th**	**7th**	**8th**	**9th**	**10th**	**11th**	**12th**	**13th**	**14th**	**15th**	**16th**	**17th**	**18th**	**19th**	**20th**
Points (R)	30	25	22	19	17	15	14	13	12	11	10	9	8	7	6	5	4	3	2	1
Points (O)	45	38	33	29	26	23	21	20	18	17	15	14	12	11	9	8	6	5	4	2

- The driver who qualified on pole was awarded one additional point.
- An additional point was awarded to the driver who led the most laps in a race.

Pos	Driver	STP		BAR		IMS		INDY	ROA		IOW	TOR		MOH		GMP	POR		Points
1	(Mexico) Patricio O'Ward RY	1*	**7***	1*	**1***	**4**	**7**	2	2	**4**	**1***	1*	2	**1***	**1***	3	**1***	1*	491
2	(United States) Colton Herta	3	8	**2**	3	1*	1	1	1*	2	2	**7**	6	2	2	**2***	2	4	447
3	(Uruguay) Santiago Urrutia	2	1	3	5	2*	4*	4	4	7	3	2	**1***	6	4	4	4	3	395
4	(United States) Ryan Norman	6	3	5	7	5	5	5	6	5	4	3	4	5	3	1	5	**8**	345
5	(Brazil) Victor Franzoni R	4	4	4	2	6	3	8	**3**	1*	6	6	7	4	6	6	3	5	341
6	(United States) Aaron Telitz	**DNS**	9	8	4	3	2	6	5	3	7	4	3	7	7	5	6	2	316
7	(Canada) Dalton Kellett	8	6	6	6	7	6	**3***	7	6	5	5	5	3	5	7	7	7	299
8	(United States) Shelby Blackstock	5	2																42
9	(United States) Neil Alberico	7	5																31
10	(South Korea) Heamin Choi																8	6	28
11	(Mexico) Alfonso Celis Jr. R			7	8														27
12	(United States) Davey Hamilton Jr. R							7											21
Pos	Driver	STP		BAR		IMS		INDY	ROA		IOW	TOR		MOH		GMP	POR		Points

Color	Result
Gold	Winner
Silver	2nd place
Bronze	3rd place
Green	4th & 5th place
Light Blue	6th–10th place
Dark Blue	Finished (Outside Top 10)
Purple	Did not finish
Red	Did not qualify (DNQ)
Brown	Withdrawn (Wth)
Black	Disqualified (DSQ)
White	Did not start (DNS)
Blank	Did not participate (DNP)
Blank	Not competing

**In-line notation**
**Bold**	Pole position (1 point)
Italics	Ran fastest race lap
*	Led most race laps (1 point)
^{1}	Qualifying cancelled no bonus point awarded
R	Rookie
RY	Rookie of the Year

- Ties in points broken by number of wins, or best finishes.

=== Teams' championship ===
Scoring system

Position	**1st**	**2nd**	**3rd**	**4th**	**5th**	**6th**	**7th**	**8th**	**9th**	**10th+**
Points	22	18	15	12	10	8	6	4	2	1

- Single car teams receive 3 bonus points as an equivalency to multi-car teams
- Only the best two results count for teams fielding more than two entries

Pos	Team	Points
1	(United States) Andretti Autosport	614
2	(United States) Belardi Auto Racing	455
3	(United States) Juncos Racing	291
4	(United States) Team Pelfrey	59

== See also ==
- 2018 IndyCar Series
- 2018 Pro Mazda Championship
- 2018 U.S. F2000 National Championship
