= Shelby Blackstock =

American racing driver

- Born: Shelby Steven McEntire Blackstock; February 23, 1990 (age 36); Nashville, Tennessee, U.S.
- Occupation: Race car driver
- Years active: 2012–present
- Spouse: Marissa Branch (m. 2022)
- Mother: Reba McEntire
- Website: www.shelbyblackstock.com

Shelby Steven McEntire Blackstock (born February 23, 1990) is an American race car driver. He is the son of country music singer Reba McEntire and her ex-husband Narvel Blackstock.

== Early life ==
Blackstock was born on February 23, 1990, in Nashville, Tennessee to Reba McEntire and Narvel Blackstock. His older half-brother, Brandon Blackstock, was formerly married to singer Kelly Clarkson. He also has two older half-sisters, Shawna and Chassidy. He moved to Los Angeles in 2001 when his mom began starring in the sitcom Reba. Blackstock attended the University of Arizona but dropped out after his freshman year to focus on racing.

== Racing career ==
Blackstock began his racing career in college when he went to a Bob Bondurant race school. He dropped out of college and decided to pursue a racing career full-time. His first significant appearances were in Skip Barber competition in 2010 and 2011. In 2011, he made his professional debut driving a Ford Mustang in the Continental Tire Sports Car Challenge. He also finished fifth in the 2011 Skip Barber National Championship. In 2012, he moved to the U.S. F2000 National Championship with Andretti Autosport. He finished eighth in points with a best finish of fourth at Road America. He moved up with Andretti Autosport to the Pro Mazda Championship in 2013, finishing third in points and capturing a win at Canadian Tire Motorsports Park among six podium finishes in 16 races. In 2014 he continued in Pro Mazda with Andretti, but fell to fourth in points, but still captured six podium finishes, but not a race victory.

In 2015, Blackstock signed to race for Andretti Autosport in the Indy Lights series. Blackstock made 50 Indy Lights starts for Andretti Autosport and Belardi Auto Racing over the next three seasons, finishing on the podium twice, both at the Mid-Ohio Sports Car Course, and had a best points finish of eighth in 2016. While he may have only had two podiums over that time, he was also consistent, registering only two DNF's. Blackstock participated in the season-opening weekend of the 2018 Indy Lights season with Team Pelfrey and finished second in the second race, his career best Indy Lights finish. However, that would be his last Indy Lights race.

In 2019, Blackstock moved to touring car racing participating in the IMSA Michelin Pilot Challenge where he finished fourth in points in the TCR class in a Honda Civic. In 2020, he competed in the GT World Challenge America in an Acura NSX. He and co-driver Trent Hindman won the series' Silver Cup for professional drivers by default as they were the only class entry to compete in every race.

== Personal life ==
In February 2022, Blackstock married his girlfriend of eight years, Marissa Branch, at Walt Disney World, and on April 14, 2026, the couple announced on Instagram that they were expecting a baby boy in October of 2026, with a Disney photoshoot.

== American open-wheel racing results ==
(key)

=== U.S. F2000 National Championship ===
Year	Team	1	2	3	4	5	6	7	8	9	10	11	12	13	14	Rank	Points	Ref
2012	Andretti Autosport	SEB; 7	SEB; 32	STP; 6	STP; 8	LOR; 18	MOH; 6	MOH; 5	ROA; 21	ROA; 8	ROA; 4	BAL; 21	BAL; 8	VIR; 6	VIR; 7	8th	153	

=== Pro Mazda Championship ===
Year	Team	1	2	3	4	5	6	7	8	9	10	11	12	13	14	15	16	Rank	Points	Ref
2013	Andretti Autosport	AUS; 9	AUS; 3	STP; 2	STP; 3	IND; 3	IOW; 7	TOR; 6	TOR; 7	MOS; 2	MOS; 1	MOH; 2	MOH; 4	TRO; 6	TRO; 11	HOU; 4	HOU; 6	3rd	297	
2014	Andretti Autosport	STP; 10	STP; 4	BAR; 5	BAR; 3	IMS; 2	IMS; 17	LOR; 7	HOU; 5	HOU; 3	MOH; 3	MOH; 19	MIL; 3	SON; 5	SON; 3			4th	235	

=== Indy Lights ===
Year	Team	1	2	3	4	5	6	7	8	9	10	11	12	13	14	15	16	17	18	Rank	Points	Ref
2015	Andretti Autosport	STP; 10	STP; 11	LBH; 9	ALA; 9	ALA; 10	IMS; 8	IMS; 8	INDY; 8	TOR; 4	TOR; 6	MIL; 11	IOW; 9	MOH; 3	MOH; 6	LAG; 8	LAG; 5			10th	218	
2016	Andretti Autosport	STP; 14	STP; 11	PHX; 14	ALA; 4	ALA; 5	IMS; 10	IMS; 7	INDY; 4	RDA; 13	RDA; 5	IOW; 12	TOR; 10	TOR; 9	MOH; 8	MOH; 5	WGL; 6	LAG; 10	LAG; 11	8th	227	
2017	Belardi Auto Racing	STP; 4	STP; 6	ALA; 7	ALA; 8	IMS; 9	IMS; 14	INDY; 11	ROA; 8	ROA; 6	IOW; 13	TOR; 11	TOR; 13	MOH; 4	MOH; 3	GMP; 9	WGL; 12			10th	207	
2018	Team Pelfrey	STP; 5	STP; 2	ALA	ALA	IMS	IMS	INDY	ROA	ROA	IOW	TOR	TOR	MOH	MOH	GTW	POR	POR		8th	42	

* Season still in progress
