= 2012 U.S. F2000 National Championship =

Car racing competition

Seasons
- ← 2011 2013 →

The 2012 U.S. F2000 National Championship is a season of the U.S. F2000 National Championship, an open wheel auto racing series that is the first step in IndyCar's Road to Indy ladder. It is the third full season of the series since its revival in 2010. Rookie Australian/American driver Matthew Brabham, son of Geoff Brabham, captured the title over is Cape Motosports teammate, second-year American Spencer Pigot by seven points in the final pair of races at Virginia International Raceway. Even though Pigot won the final two races of the season, Brabham's lead was large enough and his finishes in the final two races were high enough to capture the championship. Brabham only won four races compared to Pigot's eight wins. However, Brabham only failed to finish in the top-10 once with a single DNF while Pigot finished outside the top-10 three times in what would ultimately decide the championship. The only other driver to capture a race win during the season was Belardi Auto Racing's Scott Anderson.

Norwegian Henrik Furuseth captured the National Class championship over American R. C. Enerson in the final race of the season when Enerson was involved in an incident in the first lap of the race after passing Furuseth. The crash dropped Enerson to third in points as Mark Eaton finished second in class in the race and edged out Enerson for second place in National Class by four points.

One notable driver to compete in the championship was Michael Johnson of Flint, Michigan who is a paraplegic, having lost use of his legs in a motorcycle racing accident. Johnson finished 15th in points with a best finish of tenth at Road America.

== Drivers and teams ==
- In line with U.S. F2000 regulations, National Class cars were ineligible to compete at Lucas Oil Raceway at Indianapolis.

Team	No.	Driver(s)	Status	Round(s)
(United States) Cape Motorsports w/ Wayne Taylor Racing	2	(United States) Spencer Pigot		All
(United States) Cape Motorsports w/ Wayne Taylor Racing	3	(United States) Trent Hindman		All
(United States) Cape Motorsports w/ Wayne Taylor Racing	13	(Norway) Henrik Furuseth	N	All
(United States) Cape Motorsports w/ Wayne Taylor Racing	83	(Australia) Matthew Brabham		All
(United States) Belardi Auto Racing	4	(Australia) Roman Lagudi		All
(United States) Belardi Auto Racing	9	(United States) Luca Forgeois		1–10
(United States) Belardi Auto Racing	9	(United Kingdom) Wayne Boyd	U	11–14
(United States) Belardi Auto Racing	11	(United States) Colin Thompson		All
(United States) Belardi Auto Racing	14	(United States) Scott Anderson		All
(United States) Pabst Racing Services	5	(Canada) Dalton Kellett		All
(United States) Pabst Racing Services	6	(United States) J. R. Smart	N	3–4, 6–14
(United States) Pabst Racing Services	6	(United States) J. R. Smart	U	5
(United States) Pabst Racing Services	18	(United States) Shannon McIntosh		All
(United States) Andretti Autosport	7	(Canada) Thomas McGregor		All
(United States) Andretti Autosport	8	(United States) Shelby Blackstock		All
(United States) ZSports Midwest w/ Team E Racing	10	(United States) R. C. Enerson	N	1–4, 6–14
(United States) ZSports Midwest w/ Team E Racing	10	(United States) R. C. Enerson	U	5
(United States) Robinson Motor Sports	12	(United States) Eric Filgueiras	N U	1–2
(United States) Robinson Motor Sports	25	(United States) Joel Janco	N	3–14
(United States) Robinson Motor Sports	92	(United States) Mark Eaton	N	All
(United States) Robinson Motor Sports	97	(United States) Paul Alspach	N U	1–2, 6–7
(United States) Genoa Racing/Primus Racing	13	(United Kingdom) Isaac Lyons		1–2
(United States) ArmsUp Motorsports	15	(United States) Luigi Biangardi		All
(United States) ArmsUp Motorsports	16	(Canada) James Dayson	N U	8–14
(United States) ArmsUp Motorsports	59	(United States) Bobby Kelley	N U	1–2
(United States) Afterburner Autosport	17	(United States) Timmy Megenbier		1–5
(United States) Afterburner Autosport	17	(United States) Brian Tomasi	U	6–10
(United States) Afterburner Autosport	21	(South Korea) Heamin Choi		1–10
(United States) JDC Motorsports	19	(United States) Neil Alberico		All
(United States) JDC Motorsports	38	(Canada) Scott Hargrove		1–4, 8–14
(United States) JDC Motorsports	54	(United States) Michael Johnson		All
(United States) JDC Motorsports	85	(United States) Chris Miller		1–7
(United States) JDC Motorsports	85	(United States) Luca Forgeois		13–14
(United States) JDC Motorsports	93	(United States) Zac Silver		1–4
(United States) JAY Motorsports	23	(United States) Jason Wolfe		All
(United States) JAY Motorsports	91	(United States) Patrick Gallagher	N	All
(United States) JAY Motorsports	65	(United States) Michael Geldart	N U	1–2
(United States) JAY Motorsports	98	(United States) Jim Libecco	N	1–7, 11–14
(United States) AcceleRace Motorsports	28	(United States) Ardie Greenamyer	N	1–2
(United States) Special Addition Racing	41	(United States) Wally Osinga	N U	1–4
(United States) PRL Motorsports	48	(Poland) Patryk Tararuj	N U	11–12
(United States) PRL Motorsports	48	(United States) Patrick Linn	N	1–10, 13–14
(United States) PRL Motorsports	99	(United States) Patrick Linn	N	11–12
(Canada) MDL Racing	56	(Canada) Matthew Di Leo		All
(United States) Alliance Autosport	71	(United States) Scott Rettich	N	1–4, 6–7
(United States) One Formula Racing	77	(United States) Colette Davis	N U	1–4
(United States) Cruzinc Racing	86	(United States) Eric Cruz	N	All

Icon	Legend
N	National Class
U	Unregistered drivers

== Schedule ==
The race schedule was announced on January 11, 2012. Fourteen races were announced, all at venues that hosted the series in 2011. The final race weekend's location and date were announced on January 17, 2012.

Icon	Legend
O	Oval/Speedway
R	Road course
S	Street circuit

Rd.	Date	Race name	Track	Location	Supporting
1	March 15–16	support event for the Mobil 1 Twelve Hours of Sebring	R Sebring International Raceway	Sebring, Florida	ALMS
2	March 15–16	support event for the Mobil 1 Twelve Hours of Sebring	R Sebring International Raceway	Sebring, Florida	ALMS
3	March 24–25	USF2000 St. Petersburg Grand Prix presented by Allied Building Products	S Streets of St. Petersburg	St. Petersburg, Florida	IndyCar Series
4	March 24–25	USF2000 St. Petersburg Grand Prix presented by Allied Building Products	S Streets of St. Petersburg	St. Petersburg, Florida	IndyCar Series
5	May 26	Night Before the 500	O Lucas Oil Raceway	Clermont, Indiana	USAC Midgets
6	August 4–5	Mid-Ohio Grand Prix presented by Allied Building Products	R Mid-Ohio Sports Car Course	Lexington, Ohio	IndyCar Series
7	August 4–5	Mid-Ohio Grand Prix presented by Allied Building Products	R Mid-Ohio Sports Car Course	Lexington, Ohio	IndyCar Series
8	August 17–18	support event for the Road Race Showcase	R Road America	Elkhart Lake, Wisconsin	ALMS
9	August 17–18	support event for the Road Race Showcase	R Road America	Elkhart Lake, Wisconsin	ALMS
10	August 17–18	support event for the Road Race Showcase	R Road America	Elkhart Lake, Wisconsin	ALMS
11	September 1–2	USF2000 Baltimore Grand Prix Presented by Allied Building Products	S Streets of Baltimore	Baltimore, Maryland	IndyCar Series
12	September 1–2	USF2000 Baltimore Grand Prix Presented by Allied Building Products	S Streets of Baltimore	Baltimore, Maryland	IndyCar Series
13	September 14–15	USF2000 Grand Prix of Virginia	R Virginia International Raceway	Danville, Virginia	ALMS
14	September 14–15	USF2000 Grand Prix of Virginia	R Virginia International Raceway	Danville, Virginia	ALMS

== Race results ==
Rd.	Track	Pole position	Fastest lap	Most laps led	Race winner	
Rd.	Track	Pole position	Fastest lap	Most laps led	Driver	Team
1	Sebring International Raceway	(United States) Luigi Biangardi	(Australia) Matthew Brabham	(Australia) Matthew Brabham	(Australia) Matthew Brabham	(United States) Cape Motorsports with WTR
2	Sebring International Raceway	(Australia) Matthew Brabham	(Australia) Matthew Brabham	(Australia) Matthew Brabham	(United States) Spencer Pigot	(United States) Cape Motorsports with WTR
3	Streets of St. Petersburg	(United States) Spencer Pigot	(Australia) Matthew Brabham	(United States) Spencer Pigot	(United States) Spencer Pigot	(United States) Cape Motorsports with WTR
4	Streets of St. Petersburg	(Australia) Matthew Brabham	(Australia) Matthew Brabham	(United States) Spencer Pigot	(United States) Spencer Pigot	(United States) Cape Motorsports with WTR
5	Lucas Oil Raceway at Indianapolis	(Australia) Matthew Brabham	(Australia) Matthew Brabham	(United States) Spencer Pigot	(United States) Spencer Pigot	(United States) Cape Motorsports with WTR
6	Mid-Ohio Sports Car Course	(Australia) Matthew Brabham	(United States) Spencer Pigot	(United States) Spencer Pigot	(United States) Spencer Pigot	(United States) Cape Motorsports with WTR
7	Mid-Ohio Sports Car Course	(United States) Spencer Pigot	(Australia) Roman Lagudi	(United States) Scott Anderson	(United States) Scott Anderson	(United States) Belardi Auto Racing
8	Road America	(United States) Scott Anderson	(Australia) Matthew Brabham	(United States) Spencer Pigot (Australia) Matthew Brabham	(Australia) Matthew Brabham	(United States) Cape Motorsports with WTR
9	Road America	(Australia) Matthew Brabham	(United States) Scott Anderson	(Australia) Matthew Brabham	(Australia) Matthew Brabham	(United States) Cape Motorsports with WTR
10	Road America	(United States) Scott Anderson	(United States) Spencer Pigot	(United States) Scott Anderson	(United States) Scott Anderson	(United States) Belardi Auto Racing
11	Streets of Baltimore	Qualifying abandoned	(Australia) Matthew Brabham	(United States) Spencer Pigot	(United States) Spencer Pigot	(United States) Cape Motorsports with WTR
12	Streets of Baltimore	(Australia) Matthew Brabham	(Australia) Matthew Brabham	(Australia) Matthew Brabham	(Australia) Matthew Brabham	(United States) Cape Motorsports with WTR
13	Virginia International Raceway	(United States) Spencer Pigot	(United States) Spencer Pigot	(United States) Spencer Pigot	(United States) Spencer Pigot	(United States) Cape Motorsports with WTR
14	Virginia International Raceway	(United States) Spencer Pigot	(United States) Spencer Pigot	(United States) Spencer Pigot	(United States) Spencer Pigot	(United States) Cape Motorsports with WTR

== Championship standings ==
=== Championship Class ===
Pos	Driver	SEB		STP		LOR	MOH		RAM			BAL		VIR		Points
1	(Australia) Matthew Brabham	1*	**2***	2	**2**	**2**	**3**	25	1*	**1***	3	2	**1***	4	8	339
2	(United States) Spencer Pigot	3	1	**1***	1*	1*	1*	**23**	16*	3	2	1	24	**1***	**1***	332
3	(United States) Scott Anderson	5	8	28	10	4	2	1*	**3**	2	**1***	5	2	26	6	256
4	(Canada) Matthew Di Leo	12	4	18	3	8	7	2	2	4	5	3	6	7	21	220
5	(United States) Trent Hindman	36	30	5	4	5	4	3	4	6	8	25	12	8	3	189
6	(Australia) Roman Lagudi	2	3	3	5	3	5	16	7	9	28	7	27			173
7	(United States) Neil Alberico	9	5	17	34	16	19	6	5	5	6	13	5	2	5	170
8	(United States) Shelby Blackstock	7	32	6	8	18	6	5	21	8	4	21	8	6	7	153
9	(Canada) Thomas McGregor	4	7	7	7	12	27	10	23	28	21	9	9	9	9	134
10	(United States) Luigi Biangardi	**35**	9	4	33	11	29	4	6	7	7	4	27	24	22	129
11	(Canada) Scott Hargrove	11	11	30	32				8	13	9	6	3	5	4	128
12	(United States) Colin Thompson	8	10	31	13	14	8	28	9	10	20	12	4	10	10	103
13	(United States) Jason Wolfe	14	34	19	9	10	12	29	26	14	23	10	10	25	13	84
14	(Canada) Dalton Kellett	10	19	33	14	20	9	7	10	16	22	26	21	11	26	78
15	(United States) Michael Johnson	18	27	13	25	17	13	24	11	29	10	14	26	12	11	72
16	(United States) Luca Forgeois	33	26	26	6	6	10	22	24	12	27			23	12	66
17	(South Korea) Heamin Choi	16	18	10	12	15	26	15	12	27	12					55
18	(United States) Shannon McIntosh	15	23	11	24	13	21	18	25	21	14	24	15	16	20	54
19	(United States) Timmy Megenbier	6	6	32	11	9										53
20	(United States) Chris Miller	26	15	8	26	19	11	13	22	11	25					52
21	(United States) Zac Silver	13	12	34	19											20
22	(United Kingdom) Isaac Lyons	31	35													2
Unregistered drivers ineligible for points
	(United Kingdom) Wayne Boyd											26	11	3	2	
	(United States) R. C. Enerson					7										
	(United States) Brian Tomasi						17	DNS	13	15	DNS					
	(United States) J. R. Smart					21										
Pos	Driver	SEB		STP		LOR	MOH		RAM			BAL		VIR		Points

Color	Result
Gold	Winner
Silver	2nd place
Bronze	3rd place
Green	4th & 5th place
Light Blue	6th–10th place
Dark Blue	Finished (Outside Top 10)
Purple	Did not finish
Red	Did not qualify (DNQ)
Brown	Withdrawn (Wth)
Black	Disqualified (DSQ)
White	Did not start (DNS)
Blank	Did not participate

**In-line notation** Championship Class only
**Bold**	Pole position (1 point)
Italics	Ran fastest race lap (1 point)
*	Led most race laps (1 point); Not awarded if more than one driver leads most laps

=== National Class ===
Pos	Driver	SEB		STP		MOH		RAM			BAL		VIR		Points
1	(Norway) Henrik Furuseth	21	13	12	23	16	8	27	17	11	8	23	13	14	205
2	(United States) Mark Eaton	17	14	29	16	30	14	15	19	15	15	7	15	15	191
3	(United States) RC Enerson	29	17	9	15	14	11	14	18	13	11	28	14	25	187
4	(United States) Jim Libecco	28	22	20	20	20	9				22	13	18	16	98
5	(United States) Patrick Gallagher	22	33	15	17	18	26	17	20	24	27	14			95
6	(United States) Patrick Linn	23	31	21	22	23	17	DNS	23	17	17	16	17	19	95
7	(United States) J. R. Smart			22	21	24	20	28	22	16	16	17	19	17	85
8	(United States) Scott Rettich	19	16	14	18	15	27								79
9	(United States) Eric Cruz	32	25	25	28	25	21	18	24	18	19	18	20	24	56
10	(United States) Joel Janco			23	27	28	19	19	26	26	18	22	22	23	42
11	(Canada) James Dayson										20	19	21	18	24
12	(United States) Ardie Greenamyer			16	30										11
Unregistered drivers ineligible for points
	(United States) Paul Alspach	30	21			22	12								
	(Canada) James Dayson							20	25	19					
	(United States) Bobby Kelley	20	20												
	(Poland) Patryk Tararuj										23	20			
	(United States) Michael Geldart	25	24												
	(United States) Collete Davis	24	29	27	31										
	(United States) Wally Osinga	27	DNS	24	29										
	(United States) Eric Filgueiras	34	28												
Pos	Driver	SEB		STP		MOH		RAM			BAL		VIR		Points

=== Teams' ===
Pos	Team	Points
1	(United States) Cape Motorsports w/ Wayne Taylor Racing	491
2	(United States) Belardi Auto Racing	310
3	(United States) JDC Motorsports	165
4	(United States) Andretti Autosport	144
5	(Canada) MDL Racing	135
6	(United States) ArmsUp Motorsports	77
7	(United States) Afterburner Autosport	41
8	(United States) Pabst Racing Services	40
9	(United States) JAY Motorsports	40
10	(United States) ZSports Midwest	26
11	(United States) PRL Motorsports	14
12	(United States) Alliance Autosport	6
13	(United States) AcceleRace Motorsports	2
