= 2016 Indy Lights =

Indy Light season

2016 Indy Lights season
- Indy Lights

Season
- Races: 18
- Start date: March 12
- End date: September 11

Awards
- Drivers' champion: (United Arab Emirates) Ed Jones
- Teams' champion: (United Kingdom) Carlin
- Rookie of the Year: (Uruguay) Santiago Urrutia

The 2016 Indy Lights season was a season of open wheel motor racing. It was the 31st season of the Indy Lights series and the 15th sanctioned by IndyCar, acting as the primary support series for the IndyCar Series.

Dubai born British sophomore driver Ed Jones won the championship by a narrow two point margin over rookie Uruguayan Santiago Urrutia. Jones won two races compared to Urrutia's four wins but Jones more consistently finished on the podium. American Kyle Kaiser won twice and made few mistakes and finished third in points. Kaiser finished just ahead of American Zach Veach whose season began poorly but won three of the last ten races. Dean Stoneman and Félix Serrallés also captured two wins, but were much less consistent and finished fifth and sixth in the championship respectively. Swede Felix Rosenqvist won three races but missed much of the season due to his role as a Mercedes factory driver in Europe.

Jones' Carlin team won the teams' championship and in the final race of the season, Jones' Carlin teammate Serrallés ceded fourth place to Jones on the final lap, allowing him to win the championship.

== Team and driver chart ==
- All drivers compete in Cooper Tire–shod Dallara IL-15 chassis with Mazda AER engine.

Team	No.	Drivers	Rounds
Andretti Autosport	27	(United Kingdom) Dean Stoneman	All
Andretti Autosport	28	(Canada) Dalton Kellett	All
Andretti Autosport	51	(United States) Shelby Blackstock	All
Belardi Auto Racing	5	(United States) Zach Veach	All
Belardi Auto Racing	14	(Sweden) Felix Rosenqvist	1–8, 12–13
Belardi Auto Racing	45	(United States) James French	9–10
Carlin	4	(Puerto Rico) Félix Serrallés	All
Carlin	11	(United Arab Emirates) Ed Jones	All
Carlin	22	(United States) Neil Alberico	All
Juncos Racing	13	(Canada) Zachary Claman DeMelo	All
Juncos Racing	18	(United States) Kyle Kaiser	All
McCormack Racing	34	(United States) Davey Hamilton Jr.	17–18
Schmidt Peterson Motorsports	7	(United States) RC Enerson	1–8
Schmidt Peterson Motorsports	17	(Brazil) André Negrão	All
Schmidt Peterson Motorsports	55	(Uruguay) Santiago Urrutia	All
Schmidt Peterson Motorsports	77	(United States) Scott Anderson	1–2, 4–7
Schmidt Peterson Motorsports	77	(South Korea) Heamin Choi	3, 8, 11, 17–18
Team Pelfrey	2	(Colombia) Juan Piedrahita	1–13
Team Pelfrey	2	(United States) Sean Rayhall	17–18
Team Pelfrey	3	(Canada) Scott Hargrove	1–8
Team Pelfrey	3	(Canada) Garett Grist	9–10, 12–18

- Team Pelfrey purchased the assets of 8Star Motorsports

== Schedule ==
The 2016 schedule was released on October 27, 2015. Phoenix and Road America returned to the calendar. Long Beach was removed from the schedule, and with the IndyCar Series not returning to the Milwaukee Mile, Indy Lights will not return either.

The Grand Prix of Boston was announced in late May 2015. The race was scheduled to be run on Labor Day Weekend on September 4, 2016. The proposed street circuit was based in the Boston Seaport District. On April 29, 2016, Boston newspapers reported that the race weekend, which was to include an Indy Lights support race, had been canceled. The race was replaced by a race at Watkins Glen International, on the same weekend.

The season will expand to 18 races, two more than the previous season. All races on road courses and street circuits will be double headers with the exception of Watkins Glen, which, like the oval tracks, will have only one race.

All races will be run in support of IndyCar races except the final weekend at Mazda Raceway Laguna Seca, which will be a Mazda Road to Indy headliner weekend.

Rd.	Date	Race name	Track	Location	TV
1	March 12	Indy Lights Grand Prix of St. Petersburg Presented by Lucas School of Racing	Streets of St. Petersburg	St. Petersburg, Florida	NBCSN
2	March 13	Indy Lights Grand Prix of St. Petersburg Presented by Lucas School of Racing	Streets of St. Petersburg	St. Petersburg, Florida	NBCSN
3	April 2	Indy Lights Grand Prix of Phoenix	Phoenix International Raceway	Phoenix, Arizona	NBCSN
4	April 23	Legacy Indy Lights 100	Barber Motorsports Park	Birmingham, Alabama	NBCSN
5	April 24	Legacy Indy Lights 100	Barber Motorsports Park	Birmingham, Alabama	NBCSN
6	May 13	Mazda Indy Lights Grand Prix of Indianapolis	Indianapolis Motor Speedway road course	Speedway, Indiana	NBCSN
7	May 14	Mazda Indy Lights Grand Prix of Indianapolis	Indianapolis Motor Speedway road course	Speedway, Indiana	NBCSN
8	May 27	Mazda Freedom 100	Indianapolis Motor Speedway oval	Speedway, Indiana	NBCSN
9	June 25	Mazda Indy Lights Grand Prix of Road America	Road America	Elkhart Lake, WI	NBCSN
10	June 26	Mazda Indy Lights Grand Prix of Road America	Road America	Elkhart Lake, WI	NBCSN
11	July 10	Indy Lights Iowa Challenge	Iowa Speedway	Newton, Iowa	NBCSN
12	July 16	Cooper Tires Grand Prix of Toronto	Exhibition Place	Toronto	NBCSN
13	July 17	Cooper Tires Grand Prix of Toronto	Exhibition Place	Toronto	NBCSN
14	July 30	Cooper Tires Indy Lights Grand Prix of Mid-Ohio	Mid-Ohio Sports Car Course	Lexington, Ohio	NBCSN
15	July 31	Cooper Tires Indy Lights Grand Prix of Mid-Ohio	Mid-Ohio Sports Car Course	Lexington, Ohio	NBCSN
16	September 3	Mazda Indy Lights Grand Prix of Watkins Glen	Watkins Glen International	Watkins Glen, New York	NBCSN
17	September 10	Mazda Indy Lights Grand Prix of Monterey	Mazda Raceway Laguna Seca	Monterey, California	NBCSN
18	September 11	Mazda Indy Lights Grand Prix of Monterey	Mazda Raceway Laguna Seca	Monterey, California	NBCSN

Oval/Speedway
Road Course
Temporary Street Circuit

== Race results ==
Round	Race	Pole position	Fastest lap	Most laps led	Race Winner	
Round	Race	Pole position	Fastest lap	Most laps led	Driver	Team
1	St. Petersburg 1	(United States) Kyle Kaiser	(United States) Zach Veach	(United States) Zach Veach	(Puerto Rico) Félix Serrallés	Carlin
2	St. Petersburg 2	(Sweden) Felix Rosenqvist	(Sweden) Felix Rosenqvist	(Sweden) Felix Rosenqvist	(Sweden) Felix Rosenqvist	Belardi Auto Racing
3	Phoenix	(United States) Kyle Kaiser	(United States) Kyle Kaiser	(United States) Kyle Kaiser	(United States) Kyle Kaiser	Juncos Racing
4	Birmingham 1	(United Arab Emirates) Ed Jones	(Uruguay) Santiago Urrutia	(United Arab Emirates) Ed Jones	(United Arab Emirates) Ed Jones	Carlin
5	Birmingham 2	(United Arab Emirates) Ed Jones	(Uruguay) Santiago Urrutia	(Uruguay) Santiago Urrutia	(Uruguay) Santiago Urrutia	Schmidt Peterson Motorsports
6	Indianapolis GP 1	(United Arab Emirates) Ed Jones	(Canada) Zachary Claman DeMelo	(United Arab Emirates) Ed Jones	(United Arab Emirates) Ed Jones	Carlin
7	Indianapolis GP 2	(United Arab Emirates) Ed Jones	(Sweden) Felix Rosenqvist	(United Kingdom) Dean Stoneman	(United Kingdom) Dean Stoneman	Andretti Autosport
8	Indianapolis	(United Arab Emirates) Ed Jones	(United States) Neil Alberico	(United Kingdom) Dean Stoneman	(United Kingdom) Dean Stoneman	Andretti Autosport
9	Road America 1	(United States) Zach Veach	(Canada) Zachary Claman DeMelo	(United States) Zach Veach	(United States) Zach Veach	Belardi Auto Racing
10	Road America 2	(United Arab Emirates) Ed Jones	(United Kingdom) Dean Stoneman	(Uruguay) Santiago Urrutia	(Uruguay) Santiago Urrutia	Schmidt Peterson Motorsports
11	Iowa	(United Arab Emirates) Ed Jones	(United States) Zach Veach	(United Arab Emirates) Ed Jones	(Puerto Rico) Félix Serrallés	Carlin
12	Toronto 1	(Sweden) Felix Rosenqvist	(Sweden) Felix Rosenqvist	(Sweden) Felix Rosenqvist	(Sweden) Felix Rosenqvist	Belardi Auto Racing
13	Toronto 2	(Sweden) Felix Rosenqvist	(Puerto Rico) Félix Serrallés	(Sweden) Felix Rosenqvist	(Sweden) Felix Rosenqvist	Belardi Auto Racing
14	Mid-Ohio 1	(Uruguay) Santiago Urrutia	(Uruguay) Santiago Urrutia	(Uruguay) Santiago Urrutia	(Uruguay) Santiago Urrutia	Schmidt Peterson Motorsports
15	Mid-Ohio 2	(Uruguay) Santiago Urrutia	(Puerto Rico) Félix Serrallés	(Uruguay) Santiago Urrutia	(Uruguay) Santiago Urrutia	Schmidt Peterson Motorsports
16	Watkins Glen	(Uruguay) Santiago Urrutia	(United Kingdom) Dean Stoneman	(United States) Zach Veach	(United States) Zach Veach	Belardi Auto Racing
17	Laguna Seca 1	(United States) Kyle Kaiser	(United States) Kyle Kaiser	(United States) Kyle Kaiser	(United States) Kyle Kaiser	Juncos Racing
18	Laguna Seca 2	(United Arab Emirates) Ed Jones	(United States) Zach Veach	(United States) Zach Veach	(United States) Zach Veach	Belardi Auto Racing

== Championship standings ==
=== Drivers' championship ===
Scoring system

Position	**1st**	**2nd**	**3rd**	**4th**	**5th**	**6th**	**7th**	**8th**	**9th**	**10th**	**11th**	**12th**	**13th**	**14th**	**15th**	**16th**	**17th**	**18th**	**19th**	**20th**
Points	30	25	22	19	17	15	14	13	12	11	10	9	8	7	6	5	4	3	2	1

- The driver who qualified on pole was awarded one additional point.
- An additional point was awarded to the driver who led the most laps in a race.
- The driver who obtained the fastest lap in a race was awarded one additional point.

Pos	Driver	STP		PHX	ALA		IND		INDY	RDA		IOW	TOR		MOH		WGL	LAG		Pts
1	(United Arab Emirates) Ed Jones	10	7	2	**1***	**2**	**1***	**4**	**2**^{1}	4	**13**	**3**^{1}	6	5	6	11	2	2	**4**	363
2	(Uruguay) Santiago Urrutia RY	4	13	4	11	1*	2	2	14	9	1*	5	4	4	**1***	**1***	**12**	5	2	361
3	(United States) Kyle Kaiser	**3**	2	**1***	15	6	6	3	16	6	6	6	3	3	9	6	4	**1***	3	334
4	(United States) Zach Veach	16*	3	8	3	10	5	10	10	**1***	3	2*	9	6	5	4	1*	3	1*	332
5	(United Kingdom) Dean Stoneman R	8	6	5	16	3	3	1*	1*	2	9	4	5	14	3	2	10	13	9	316
6	(Puerto Rico) Félix Serrallés	1	4	7	2	15	7	5	6	3	14	1	2	10	4	10	7	8	5	311
7	(Brazil) André Negrão R	6	5	6	8	11	9	16	15	10	2	13	11	2	2	3	3	9	6	268
8	(United States) Shelby Blackstock	14	11	14	4	5	10	7	4	13	5	12	10	9	8	5	6	10	11	227
9	(Canada) Zachary Claman DeMelo R	11	16	11	5	7	13	14	13	5	4	8	13	13	7	7	9	12	7	199
10	(Canada) Dalton Kellett R	15	10	10	9	9	16	12	3	14	12	9	8	11	11	9	11	7	13	193
11	(United States) Neil Alberico R	12	15	9	12	14	11	13	7	11	11	11	12	8	12	8	5	6	10	193
12	(Sweden) Felix Rosenqvist R	7	**1***	15	14	8	4	6	9				**1***	**1***						185
13	(Colombia) Juan Piedrahita	9	8	12	7	16	15	11	8	12	7	7	14	12						135
14	(United States) RC Enerson	5	12	3	6	4	8	15	11											111
15	(Canada) Garett Grist R									7	10		7	7	10	12	8	11	15	103
16	(Canada) Scott Hargrove R	2	14	13	13	12	14	9	5											93
17	(United States) Scott Anderson	13	9		10	13	12	8												61
18	(South Korea) Heamin Choi R			16					12			10						15	12	40
19	(United States) Sean Rayhall																	4	8	32
20	(United States) James French R									8	8									26
21	(United States) Davey Hamilton Jr. R																	14	14	14
Pos	Driver	STP		PHX	ALA		IND		INDY	RDA		IOW	TOR		MOH		WGL	LAG		Pts

Color	Result
Gold	Winner
Silver	2nd place
Bronze	3rd place
Green	4th & 5th place
Light Blue	6th–10th place
Dark Blue	Finished (Outside Top 10)
Purple	Did not finish
Red	Did not qualify (DNQ)
Brown	Withdrawn (Wth)
Black	Disqualified (DSQ)
White	Did not start (DNS)
Blank	Did not participate (DNP)
Blank	Not competing

**In-line notation**
**Bold**	Pole position (1 point)
Italics	Ran fastest race lap (1 point)
*	Led most race laps (1 point)
^{1}	Qualifying cancelled no bonus point awarded
Rookie

- Ties in points broken by number of wins, or best finishes.

=== Teams' championship ===
Pos	Team	Points
1	(United Kingdom) Carlin	413
2	(United States) Schmidt Peterson Motorsports w/ Curb-Agajanian	384
3	(United States) Belardi Auto Racing	322
4	(United States) Andretti Autosport	281
5	(United States) Juncos Racing	275
6	(United States) Team Pelfrey	135

== See also ==
- 2016 IndyCar Series season
- 2016 Pro Mazda Championship season
- 2016 U.S. F2000 National Championship
