= 2015 Indy Lights =

2015 Indy Lights season
- Indy Lights

Season
- Races: 16
- Start date: March 28
- End date: September 13

Awards
- Drivers' champion: (United States) Spencer Pigot
- Teams' champion: (United States) Schmidt Peterson Motorsports
- Rookie of the Year: (United States) Spencer Pigot

The 2015 Indy Lights season was the 30th season of the Indy Lights open wheel motor racing series and the 14th sanctioned by IndyCar, acting as the primary support series for the IndyCar Series. The 2015 season was the second promoted by Andersen Promotions, who also promote the other steps on the Mazda Road to Indy. It was the first season for the Dallara IL-15 along with a Mazda MZR-R turbocharged 4-cylinder engine, developed by Advanced Engine Research. 2015 was the second season with Cooper Tire as the sole tire supplier. The championship was contested over 16 races, starting on March 28 at St. Petersburg, Florida and ending on September 13 at Mazda Raceway Laguna Seca.

== Team and driver chart ==
- All drivers competed in Cooper Tire–shod Dallara chassis with Mazda AER engine.

Team	No.	Drivers	Rounds
8 Star Motorsports	8	(Canada) Scott Hargrove	1–2
8 Star Motorsports	8	(United States) Sean Rayhall	4–8, 13–16
Andretti Autosport	51	(United States) Shelby Blackstock	All
Andretti Autosport	83	(Australia) Matthew Brabham	1–3
Belardi Auto Racing	4	(Puerto Rico) Félix Serrallés	All
Belardi Auto Racing	5	(Colombia) Juan Piedrahita	All
Carlin	11	(United Arab Emirates) Ed Jones	All
Carlin	14	(United Kingdom) Max Chilton	1–8, 11–16
Carlin	14	(Brazil) Nelson Piquet Jr.	9–10
Juncos Racing	12	(United States) Spencer Pigot	All
Juncos Racing	18	(United States) Kyle Kaiser	All
Schmidt Peterson Motorsports	7	(United States) RC Enerson	All
Schmidt Peterson Motorsports	21	(South Korea) Heamin Choi	15–16
Schmidt Peterson Motorsports	42	(United Kingdom) Jack Harvey	All
Schmidt Peterson Motorsports	71	(United States) Ethan Ringel	All
Schmidt Peterson Motorsports	77	(United States) Scott Anderson	All

== Schedule ==
The 2015 schedule was released on November 3, 2014. Iowa was added in place of Pocono, whereas Sonoma was replaced by a standalone round at Laguna Seca. The rounds at St. Petersburg and Toronto were expanded to double-headers, therefore the number of races increased to 16.

Rd.	Date	Race name	Track	Location
1	March 28	(United States) St. Petersburg 100	Streets of St. Petersburg	St. Petersburg, Florida
2	March 29	(United States) St. Petersburg 100	Streets of St. Petersburg	St. Petersburg, Florida
3	April 19	(United States) Long Beach 100	Streets of Long Beach	Long Beach, California
4	April 25	(United States) Legacy Indy Lights 100	Barber Motorsports Park	Birmingham, Alabama
5	April 26	(United States) Legacy Indy Lights 100	Barber Motorsports Park	Birmingham, Alabama
6	May 8	(United States) Grand Prix of Indianapolis	Indianapolis Motor Speedway road course	Speedway, Indiana
7	May 9	(United States) Grand Prix of Indianapolis	Indianapolis Motor Speedway road course	Speedway, Indiana
8	May 22	(United States) Freedom 100	Indianapolis Motor Speedway oval	Speedway, Indiana
9	June 13	(Canada) Grand Prix of Toronto	Exhibition Place	Toronto
10	June 14	(Canada) Grand Prix of Toronto	Exhibition Place	Toronto
11	July 12	(United States) Milwaukee Race 100	Milwaukee Mile	West Allis, Wisconsin
12	July 18	(United States) Iowa Corn Indy 100	Iowa Speedway	Newton, Iowa
13	August 1	(United States) Grand Prix of Mid-Ohio	Mid-Ohio Sports Car Course	Lexington, Ohio
14	August 2	(United States) Grand Prix of Mid-Ohio	Mid-Ohio Sports Car Course	Lexington, Ohio
15	September 12	(United States) Grand Prix of Monterey	Mazda Raceway Laguna Seca	Monterey, California
16	September 13	(United States) Grand Prix of Monterey	Mazda Raceway Laguna Seca	Monterey, California

Oval/Speedway
Road Course
Temporary Street Circuit

== Race results ==
Round	Race	Pole position	Fastest lap	Most laps led	Race Winner	
Round	Race	Pole position	Fastest lap	Most laps led	Driver	Team
1	St. Petersburg 1	(United Arab Emirates) Ed Jones	(Australia) Matthew Brabham	(United Arab Emirates) Ed Jones	(United Arab Emirates) Ed Jones	Carlin
2	St. Petersburg 2	(United Arab Emirates) Ed Jones	(United Arab Emirates) Ed Jones	(United Arab Emirates) Ed Jones	(United Arab Emirates) Ed Jones	Carlin
3	Long Beach	(United Kingdom) Jack Harvey	(Puerto Rico) Félix Serrallés	(United Arab Emirates) Ed Jones	(United Arab Emirates) Ed Jones	Carlin
4	Birmingham 1	(United States) Spencer Pigot	(United States) Sean Rayhall	(United States) Spencer Pigot	(United States) Spencer Pigot	Juncos Racing
5	Birmingham 2	(United States) Spencer Pigot	(United Arab Emirates) Ed Jones	(United States) Spencer Pigot	(United States) Spencer Pigot	Juncos Racing
6	Indianapolis GP 1	(United Kingdom) Jack Harvey	(United Kingdom) Jack Harvey	(United Kingdom) Jack Harvey	(United Kingdom) Jack Harvey	Schmidt Peterson Motorsports
7	Indianapolis GP 2	(United Arab Emirates) Ed Jones	(United Kingdom) Max Chilton	(United States) Sean Rayhall	(United States) Sean Rayhall	8 Star Motorsports
8	Indianapolis	(United States) Ethan Ringel	(Puerto Rico) Félix Serrallés	(United States) Ethan Ringel	(United Kingdom) Jack Harvey	Schmidt Peterson Motorsports
9	Toronto 1	(Brazil) Nelson Piquet Jr.	(United Kingdom) Jack Harvey	(United States) Spencer Pigot	(United States) Spencer Pigot	Juncos Racing
10	Toronto 2	(United States) Spencer Pigot	(United States) Kyle Kaiser	(United States) Spencer Pigot	(United States) Spencer Pigot	Juncos Racing
11	Milwaukee	(United States) Spencer Pigot	(United States) Spencer Pigot	(United States) RC Enerson	(Puerto Rico) Félix Serrallés	Belardi Auto Racing
12	Iowa	(United Kingdom) Max Chilton	(United Arab Emirates) Ed Jones	(United Kingdom) Max Chilton	(United Kingdom) Max Chilton	Carlin
13	Mid-Ohio 1	(United States) RC Enerson	(United Kingdom) Jack Harvey	(United States) RC Enerson	(United States) RC Enerson	Schmidt Peterson Motorsports
14	Mid-Ohio 2	(United Kingdom) Jack Harvey	(United States) Scott Anderson	(United Arab Emirates) Ed Jones	(United States) Sean Rayhall	8 Star Motorsports
15	Laguna Seca 1	(United Kingdom) Max Chilton	(United States) Sean Rayhall	(United States) Spencer Pigot	(United States) Spencer Pigot	Juncos Racing
16	Laguna Seca 2	(United Kingdom) Max Chilton	(United Kingdom) Max Chilton	(United States) Spencer Pigot	(United States) Spencer Pigot	Juncos Racing

== Championship standings ==
=== Drivers' championship ===
Scoring system

Position	**1st**	**2nd**	**3rd**	**4th**	**5th**	**6th**	**7th**	**8th**	**9th**	**10th**	**11th**	**12th**	**13th**	**14th**	**15th**	**16th**	**17th**	**18th**	**19th**	**20th**
Points	30	25	22	19	17	15	14	13	12	11	10	9	8	7	6	5	4	3	2	1

- The driver who qualified on pole was awarded one additional point.
- An additional point was awarded to the driver who led the most laps in a race.
- The driver who obtained the fastest lap in a race was awarded one additional point.

Pos	Driver	STP (United States)		LBH (United States)	ALA (United States)		IND (United States)		INDY (United States)	TOR (Canada)		MIL (United States)	IOW (United States)	MOH (United States)		LAG (United States)		Pts
1	(United States) Spencer Pigot RY	3	3	2	**1***	**1***	7	12	9	1*	**1***	**7**	8	8	3	1*	1*	357
2	(United Kingdom) Jack Harvey	2	2	**10**	2	2	**1***	5	1	2	2	4	5	11	**10**	5	9	330
3	(United Arab Emirates) Ed Jones R	**1***	**1***	1*	4	11	3	**4**	10	5	3	8	2	9	9*	3	4	324
4	(United States) RC Enerson R	9	13	4	3	7	5	2	4	8	5	2*	3	**1***	4	6	6	295
5	(United Kingdom) Max Chilton R	12	4	5	5	3	4	3	DNS			6	**1***	2	2	**11**	**3**	258
6	(United States) Kyle Kaiser R	5	5	12	8	12	12	6	5	3	9	9	4	4	11	2	10	237
7	(Puerto Rico) Félix Serrallés R	13	8	3	6	4	9	11	11	DSQ	7	1	10	10	5	13	8	225
8	(Colombia) Juan Piedrahita	6	9	8	7	8	11	7	7	10	4	3	7	6	12	7	7	223
9	(United States) Scott Anderson	7	10	6	11	5	6	9	3	9	10	5	6	7	8	9	13	219
10	(United States) Shelby Blackstock R	10	11	9	9	10	8	8	8	4	6	11	9	3	6	8	5	218
11	(United States) Ethan Ringel R	8	12	7	10	9	10	10	**2***	6	11	10	11	12	7	10	12	197
12	(United States) Sean Rayhall R				12	6	2	1*	6					5	1	4	2	188
13	(Australia) Matthew Brabham	11	7	11														35
14	(Canada) Scott Hargrove R	4	6															34
15	(Brazil) Nelson Piquet Jr. R									**7**	8							28
16	(South Korea) Heamin Choi R															12	11	19
Pos	Driver	STP (United States)		LBH (United States)	ALA (United States)		IND (United States)		INDY (United States)	TOR (Canada)		MIL (United States)	IOW (United States)	MOH (United States)		LAG (United States)		Pts

Color	Result
Gold	Winner
Silver	2nd place
Bronze	3rd place
Green	4th & 5th place
Light Blue	6th–10th place
Dark Blue	Finished (Outside Top 10)
Purple	Did not finish
Red	Did not qualify (DNQ)
Brown	Withdrawn (Wth)
Black	Disqualified (DSQ)
White	Did not start (DNS)
Blank	Did not participate (DNP)
Blank	Not competing

**In-line notation**
**Bold**	Pole position (1 point)
Italics	Ran fastest race lap (1 point)
*	Led most race laps (1 point)
^{1}	Qualifying cancelled no bonus point awarded
Rookie

- Ties in points broken by number of wins, or best finishes.

=== Teams' championship ===
Pos	Team	Points
1	(United States) Schmidt Peterson Motorsports w/ Curb-Agajanian	407
2	(United Kingdom) Carlin	363
3	(United States) Juncos Racing	344
4	(United States) Belardi Auto Racing	202
5	(United States) 8Star Motorsports	176
6	(United States) Andretti Autosport	145
