= Santiago Urrutia =

Uruguayan racing driver

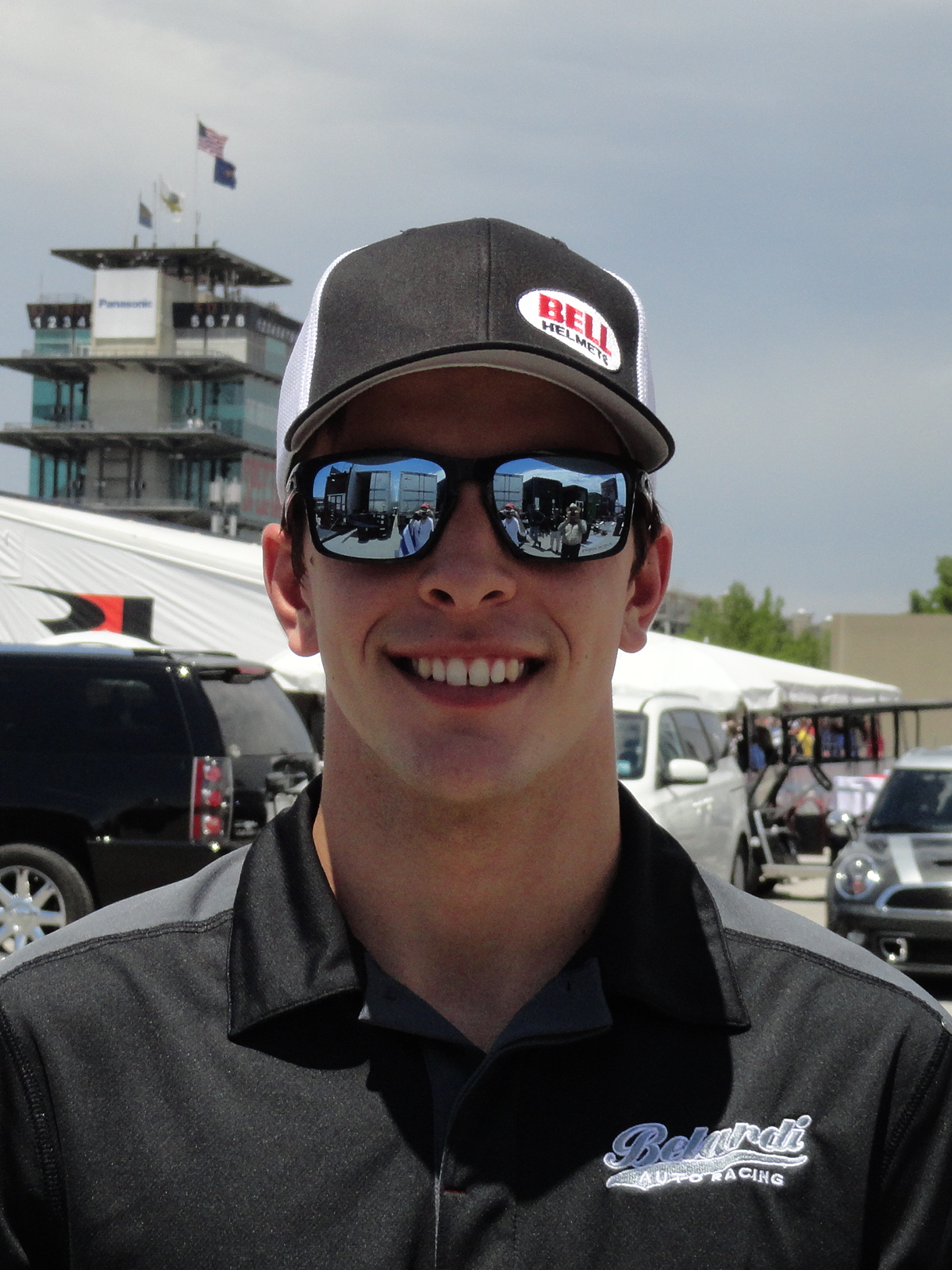
- Urrutia at the 2017 Freedom 100
- Nationality: (Uruguay) Uruguayan
- Born: Santiago Urrutia Lausarot; 30 August 1996 (age 30) Miguelete, Uruguay

Indy Lights career
- Debut season: 2016
- Current team: HMD Motorsports
- Car number: 55
- Former teams: Schmidt Peterson Motorsports; Belardi Auto Racing
- Starts: 51
- Wins: 8
- Poles: 5
- Fastest laps: 6
- Best finish: 2nd in 2016, 2017

Previous series
- 2015 2014 2013 2012 2011: Pro Mazda Championship; GP3 Series; European F3 Open; Formula Abarth; Formula Abarth

Championship titles
- 2015: Pro Mazda Championship

Santiago Urrutia Lausarot (born 30 August 1996) is a Uruguayan racing driver. He currently competes in the TCR World Tour, driving for Geely Cyan Racing. He formerly competed in Indy Lights, and was the 2015 Pro Mazda series champion.

== Racing career ==
=== Karting and junior formulae ===
Urrutia's motorsport career started at age three in dirt motorcycling on his grandfather's farm, and later moved up to go-kart racing in his native Uruguay at age five. In 2009, he won the Argentine Pre Junior Championship and the Metropolitan Mini Junior Apertura Championship. In 2010, he won the Uruguayan Master Championship.

At the 2010 Karting World Championship, Urrutia qualified fifth for the pre-final, but was involved in two incidents and finished the final in eighteenth place. At the age fourteen, Urrutia moved to Italy in 2011 and competed at the WSK Euro Series KF3. Also in 2011, he took part in the Formula Abarth season. He won Formula Abarth Rookie of the year in 2012, and participated in the Ferrari Diving Academy.

In 2013, Urrutia took part in the European F3 Open Championship, winning races at Algarve International Circuit and Silverstone Circuit. In 2014, he competed in the GP3 Series for Finnish team Koiranen GP.

=== Road to Indy ===
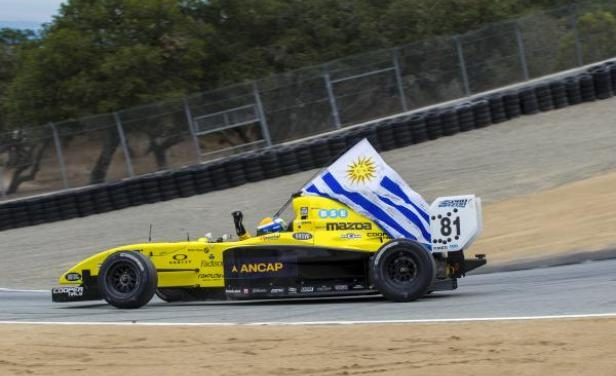
Urrutia's 2015 championship-winning car at Laguna Seca

Urrutia took part in the Pro Mazda Championship in 2015 as a driver for Team Pelfrey. He clinched the championship at Mazda Raceway Laguna Seca, sixteen years and one day after the death of fellow Uruguayan Gonzalo Rodríguez in a practice accident at the same venue. With the championship, Urrutia became the first Uruguayan to win a major international racing championship.

In 2016, Urrutia competed in Indy Lights for Schmidt Peterson Motorsports. He was placed on probation by the series in June. A weekend sweep at the Mid-Ohio Sports Car Course in July led Urrutia to the top of the point standings. Urrutia was in the hunt for the series title until the final pair of races of the season, where he ultimately lost the championship to Ed Jones by two points after Jones' teammate let him by to win the title. With SPM discontinuing their Indy Lights team, Urrutia returned to the series in 2017 as a Belardi Auto Racing driver. He scored two wins and six second place finishes, finishing runner-up in the standings to Kyle Kaiser.

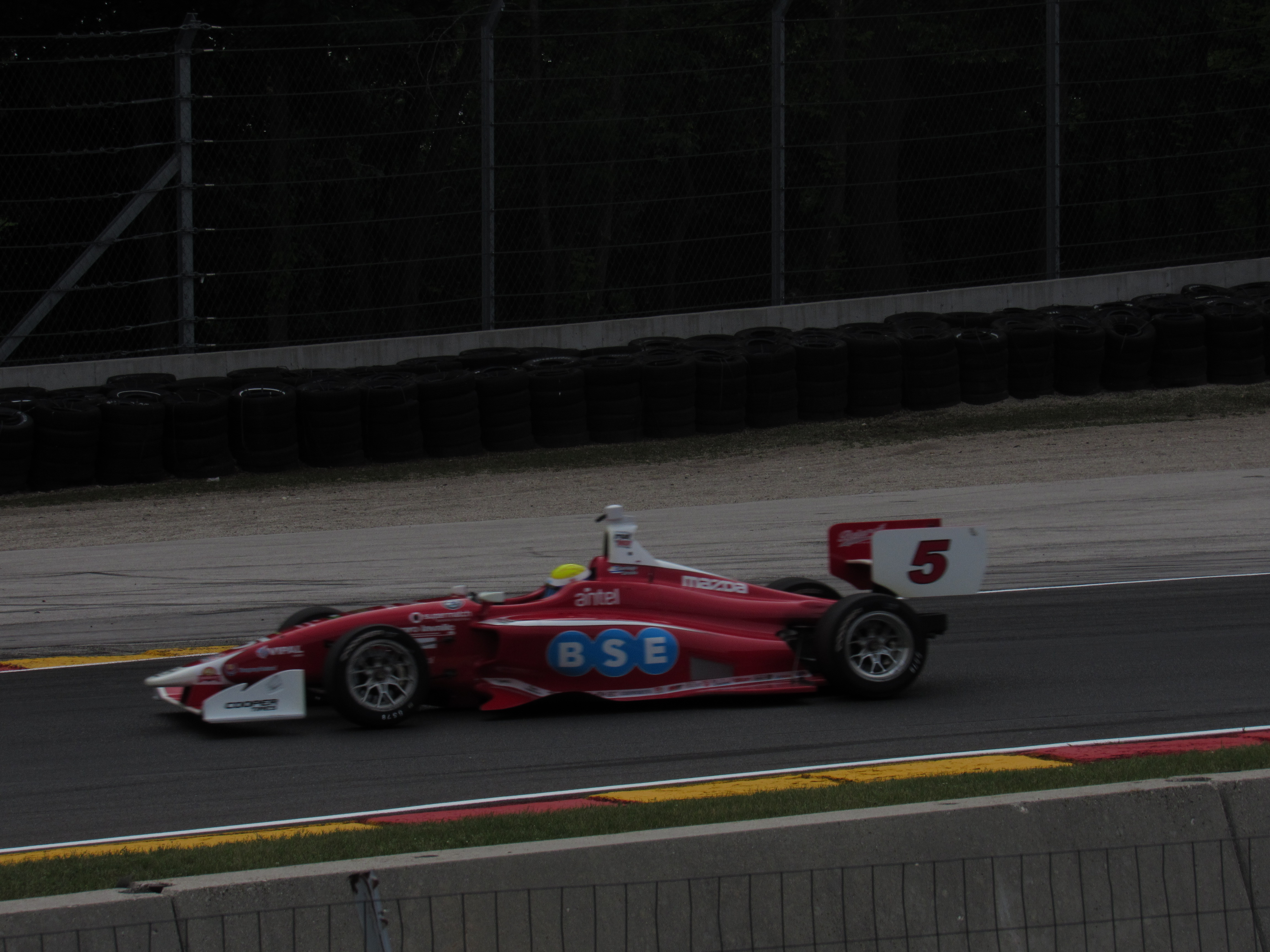
Urrutia's 2018 Indy Lights machine

At the end of 2017, Urrutia entered into a handshake deal to drive the 2018 IndyCar Series season for Harding Racing, but the team eventually rescinded on the offer and failed to pay Urrutia a $100,000 sum for the driver to compete with Belardi in Indy Lights for the season. He did, however, run a full Indy Lights season with Belardi in 2018.

=== Touring cars ===
In 2019, Urrutia raced in the European TCR series for Team WRT, finishing third in the standings and earning Rookie of the Year.

Urrutia was due to return to the Indy Lights with HMD Motorsports in 2020, but the season was cancelled due to the impact of the COVID-19 pandemic in the United States. Instead, he contested the opening round of the Formula Regional Americas Championship in its place, scoring a podium finish. The Uruguayan then took part in a test for Cyan Racing's World Touring Car Cup team, and was later signed for their 2020 campaign alongside Thed Björk.

In 2020, Urrutia competed the whole of the championship for the Cyan Performance Lynk & Co team, ending up in sixth place in the standings. He had a number of podiums and won the last race of the season.

In 2021, Urrutia continued to compete for the same team in WTCR. He won two races and had three other podium finishes, ending the championship in fifth place. He also did some races in the South American TCR championship.

In 2022, Urrutia remained with the same team for his third year in the series. Though he won two races and had another podium place, his season was stopped when the team withdrew from the championship due to safety concerns with the tyres.

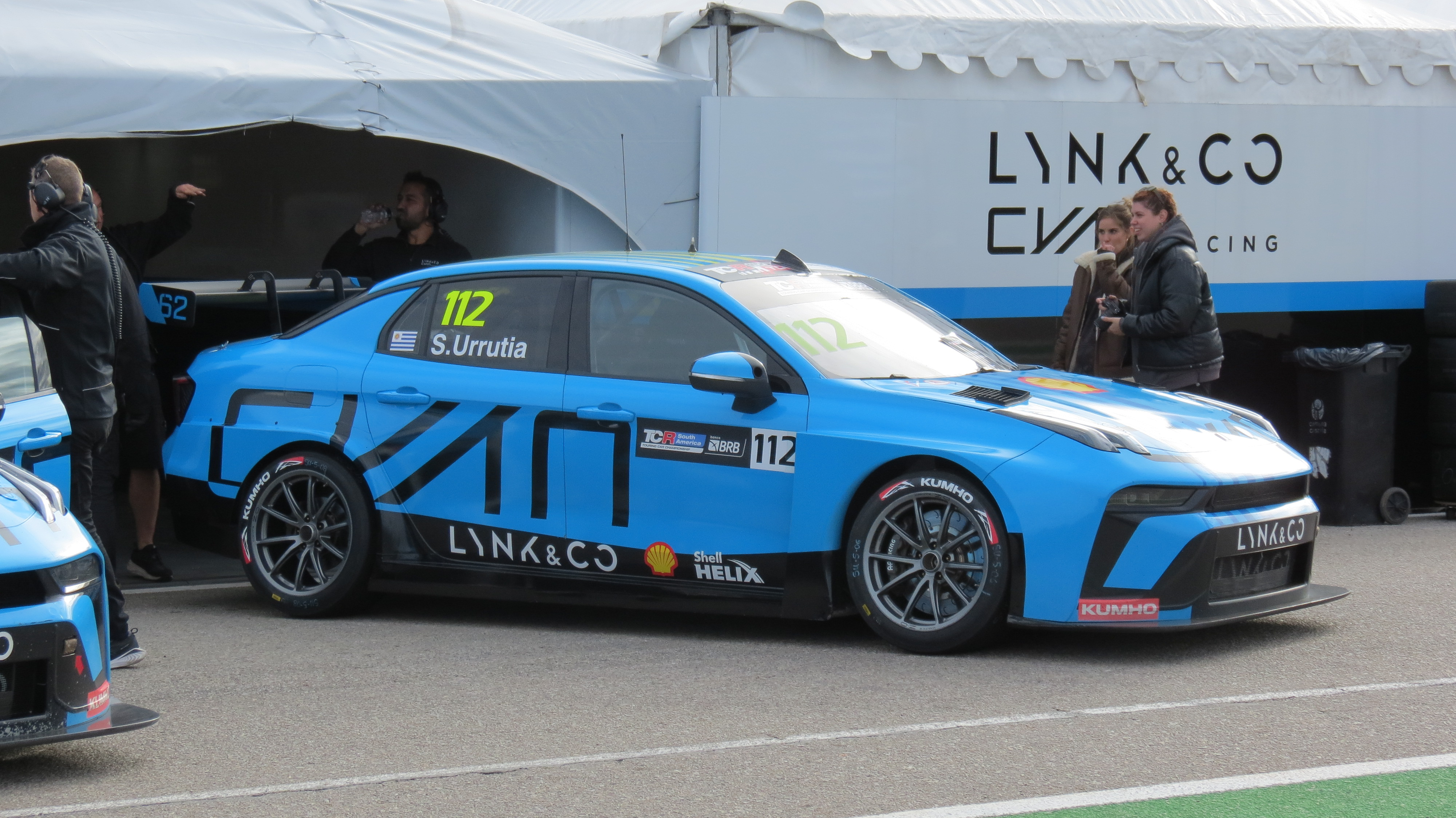
Urrutia's Lynk & Co 03 TCR during the 2023 El Pinar TCR World Tour round

In 2023, Urrutia remained again with Cyan Performance Lynk & Co. He retired from the first of two races at the initial round in Portugal, but won the second race. He won two more races that season, on home soil in Uruguay and at the Bathurst International, to finish eighth in the standings.

== Racing record ==
=== Career summary ===
Season	Series	Team	Races	Wins	Poles	F/Laps	Podiums	Points	Position
2011	Formula Abarth Italian Series	Island Motorsport	2	0	0	0	0	4	18th
2011	Formula Abarth European Series	Island Motorsport	4	0	0	0	0	5	21st
2012	Formula Abarth European Series	BVM	24	3	1	3	11	207	4th
2012	Formula Abarth Italian Series	BVM	18	3	1	3	9	158	4th
2013	European F3 Open	RP Motorsport	16	2	1	3	8	191	4th
2014	GP3 Series	Koiranen GP	18	0	0	0	0	0	23rd
2015	Pro Mazda Championship	Team Pelfrey	16	3	2	0	10	355	**1st**
2016	Indy Lights	Schmidt Peterson Motorsports	18	4	3	3	7	361	**2nd**
2017	Indy Lights	Belardi Auto Racing	16	2	1	3	9	310	**2nd**
2017	Súper TC2000	YPF Chevrolet	1	0	0	0	1	-	
2018	Indy Lights	Belardi Auto Racing	17	2	1	0	8	395	**3rd**
2018	Súper TC2000	Toyota Gazoo Racing Argentina	1	0	0	0	1	-	
2019	TCR Europe Touring Car Series	Team WRT	14	0	0	1	2	234	**3rd**
2019	TCR BeNeLux Touring Car Championship	Team WRT	10	0	0	1	4	237	4th
2019	Súper TC2000	Toyota Gazoo Racing YPF Infinia	1	0	0	0	1	-	
2020	World Touring Car Cup	Cyan Performance Lynk & Co	16	1	2	1	5	169	6th
2020	Formula Regional Americas Championship	HMD Motorsports	2	0	0	0	1	15	15th
2021	World Touring Car Cup	Cyan Performance Lynk & Co	16	2	0	0	5	167	5th
2021	TCR South America Touring Car Championship	PMO Motorsport	4	2	1	1	3	85	8th
2022	World Touring Car Cup	Cyan Performance Lynk & Co	8	2	1	1	4	137	8th
2022	TCR South America Touring Car Championship	PMO Motorsport	3	0	1	0	1	76	20th
2022	TC2000	Chevrolet YPF	1	0	0	0	1	-	
2022	Turismo Nacional - Clase 3	Lusqtoff Racing	1	0	0	0	0	-	
2023	TCR World Tour	Cyan Racing Lynk & Co	20	3	1	3	5	283	8th
2023	TCR Europe Touring Car Series	Cyan Racing Lynk & Co	6	1	0	0	2	0	NC†
2023	TCR Italy Touring Car Championship	Cyan Racing Lynk & Co	2	0	0	0	0	0	NC†
2023	TCR South America Touring Car Championship	Cyan Racing Lynk & Co	4	1	1	1	1	0	NC†
2023	TCR Australia Touring Car Series	Cyan Racing Lynk & Co	6	1	0	1	1	0	NC†
2023	Stock Car Pro Series	Scuderia Chiarelli	2	0	0	0	0	0	38th
2024	TCR World Tour	Cyan Racing Lynk & Co	14	0	2	0	3	220	7th
2024	TCR Italy Touring Car Championship	Cyan Racing Lynk & Co	2	0	0	0	0	0	NC†
2024	TCR South America Touring Car Championship	Cyan Racing Lynk & Co	4	0	1	0	1	41	28th
2025	TCR World Tour	Lynk & Co Cyan Racing	18	0	1	2	5	334	4th
2025	TCR Australia Touring Car Series	Lynk & Co Cyan Racing	4	0	0	0	0	0	NC†
2026	TCR South America Touring Car Championship	Paladini Racing							
2026	TCR World Tour	Geely Cyan Racing	18	5	0	4	9	406	**3rd***

^{†} As Urrutia was a guest driver, he was ineligible for points. ^{*} Season still in progress.

=== Complete GP3 Series results ===
(key) (Races in bold indicate pole position) (Races in italics indicate fastest lap)

Year	Entrant	1	2	3	4	5	6	7	8	9	10	11	12	13	14	15	16	17	18	Pos	Points
2014	Koiranen GP	CAT; FEA; 21	CAT; SPR; 13	RBR; FEA; 16	RBR; SPR; 12	SIL; FEA; Ret	SIL; SPR; 14	HOC; FEA; 22	HOC; SPR; 18	HUN; FEA; 12	HUN; SPR; Ret	SPA; FEA; 13	SPA; SPR; 18	MNZ; FEA; Ret	MNZ; SPR; 15	SOC; FEA; 14	SOC; SPR; 12	YMC; FEA; 11	YMC; SPR; 12	23rd	0

=== American open-wheel racing results ===
==== Pro Mazda Championship ====
Year	Team	1	2	3	4	5	6	7	8	9	10	11	12	13	14	15	16	17	Rank	Points
2015	Team Pelfrey	STP; 2	STP; 4	LOU; 1	LOU; C	BAR; 3	BAR; 2	IMS; 4	IMS; 3	**IMS**; 1	LOR; 15	TOR; 7	TOR; 4	IOW; 5	MOH; 1	MOH; 3	LAG; 2	**LAG**; 2	1st	355

==== Indy Lights ====
Year	Team	1	2	3	4	5	6	7	8	9	10	11	12	13	14	15	16	17	18	Rank	Points
2016	Schmidt Peterson Motorsports	STP; 4	STP; 13	PHX; 4	ALA; 11	ALA; 1	IMS; 2	IMS; 2	INDY; 14	RDA; 9	RDA; 1	IOW; 5	TOR; 4	TOR; 4	**MOH**; 1	**MOH**; 1	**WGL**; 12	LAG; 5	LAG; 2	2nd	361
2017	Belardi Auto Racing	STP; 13	STP; 2	ALA; 15	ALA; 13	IMS; 7	IMS; 2	INDY; 5	RDA; 2	RDA; 11	IOW; 2	TOR; 3	TOR; 11	**MOH**; 1	MOH; 2	GMP; 1	WGL; 2			2nd	310
2018	Belardi Auto Racing	STP; 2	STP; 1	ALA; 3	ALA; 5	IMS; 2	IMS; 4	INDY; 4	RDA; 4	RDA; 7	IOW; 3	TOR; 2	**TOR**; 1	MOH; 6	MOH; 4	GTW; 4	POR; 4	POR; 3		3rd	395

=== Complete TCR Europe Touring Car Series results ===
(key) (Races in bold indicate pole position) (Races in italics indicate fastest lap)

Year	Team	Car	1	2	3	4	5	6	7	8	9	10	11	12	13	14	DC	Points
2019	Team WRT	Audi RS 3 LMS TCR	HUN; 1 Ret	HUN; 2; 6	HOC; 1; 6	HOC; 2; 5	SPA; 1; 2	SPA; 2; 24	RBR; 1 Ret	RBR; 2; 7	OSC; 1; 15	OSC; 2; 5	CAT; 1; 3	CAT; 2; 17	MNZ; 1; 4	MNZ; 2; 6	3rd	234
2023	Cyan Racing Lynk & Co	Lynk & Co 03 FL TCR	ALG; 1 Ret	ALG; 2; 1	PAU; 1	PAU; 2	SPA; 1; 3	SPA; 2; 4	HUN; 1; 7	HUN; 2; 18	LEC; 1	LEC; 2	MNZ; 1	MNZ; 2	CAT; 1	CAT; 2	NC‡	0‡

^{‡} Driver was a World Tour full-time entry and was ineligible for points.

=== Complete World Touring Car Cup results ===
(key) (Races in bold indicate pole position) (Races in italics indicate fastest lap)

Year	Team	Car	1	2	3	4	5	6	7	8	9	10	11	12	13	14	15	16	17	18	DC	Points
2020	Cyan Performance Lynk & Co	Lynk & Co 03 TCR	BEL; 1; 6	BEL; 2; 3	GER; 1 Ret	GER; 2; 10	SVK; 1; 15	SVK; 2; 15	SVK; 3; 8	HUN; 1; 7	HUN; 2; 4	HUN; 3 Ret	ESP; 1; 2	ESP; 2; 3	ESP; 3; 2	**ARA**; **1**; 9	ARA; 2 NC	**ARA**; **3**; 1			6th	169
2021	Cyan Performance Lynk & Co	Lynk & Co 03 TCR	GER; 1; 3	GER; 2; 5	POR; 1; 3	POR; 2; 5	ESP; 1; 12	ESP; 2 Ret	HUN; 1; 7	HUN; 2; 1	CZE; 1; 11	CZE; 2 Ret	FRA; 1; 15	FRA; 2; 3	ITA; 1; 1	ITA; 2; 13	RUS; 1; 9	RUS; 2 Ret			5th	167
2022	Cyan Performance Lynk & Co	Lynk & Co 03 TCR	FRA; 1; 7	FRA; 2; 2	GER; 1 C	GER; 2 C	HUN; 1; 8	HUN; 2; 1	ESP; 1; 8	ESP; 2; 3	**POR**; **1**; 1	POR; 2; 10	ITA; 1 DNS	ITA; 2 DNS	ALS; 1 WD	ALS; 2 WD	BHR; 1	BHR; 2	SAU; 1	SAU; 2	8th	137

=== Complete TCR World Tour results ===
(key) (Races in bold indicate pole position) (Races in italics indicate fastest lap)

Year	Team	Car	1	2	3	4	5	6	7	8	9	10	11	12	13	14	15	16	17	18	19	20	21	DC	Points
2023	Cyan Racing Lynk & Co	Lynk & Co 03 FL TCR	ALG; 1 Ret	ALG; 2; 1	SPA; 1; 3	SPA; 2; 4	VAL; 1; 7	VAL; 2; 15	HUN; 1; 7	HUN; 2; 18	**ELP**; **1**; 1	ELP; 2; 6	VIL; 1 Ret	VIL; 2; 11	SYD; 1 NC	SYD; 2; 10	SYD; 3; 12	BAT; 1; 1	BAT; 2; 6	BAT; 3 Ret	MAC; 1; 9	MAC; 2; 2		8th	283
2024	Cyan Racing Lynk & Co	Lynk & Co 03 FL TCR	VAL; 1; 7	VAL; 2; 2	MRK; 1; 2^{2}	MRK; 2; 8	MOH; 1 DSQ	MOH; 2 DSQ	SAP; 1; 2^{1}	SAP; 2; 5	ELP; 1; 7^{6}	ELP; 2 DSQ	**ZHZ**; **1**; 5^{1}	ZHZ; 2; 4	MAC; 1; 13	MAC; 2; 12								7th	220
2025	Lynk & Co Cyan Racing	Lynk & Co 03 FL TCR	AHR; 1; 2	AHR; 2; 5	AHR; 3; 3	**CRT**; **1**; 2	CRT; 2; 8	CRT; 3; 2	MNZ; 1 Ret	MNZ; 2; 6	CVR; 1; 2	CVR; 2; 7	BEN; 1 C	BEN; 2; 12	BEN; 3; 11	INJ; 1; 5	INJ; 2; 6	INJ; 3; 5	ZHZ; 1; 10	ZHZ; 2; 5	ZHZ; 3; 5	MAC; 1; 10	MAC; 2; 15	4th	334
2026	Geely Cyan Racing	Geely Preface TCR	MIS; 1; 4	MIS; 2; 6	CRT; 1; 1	CRT; 2; 1	CRT; 3; 1	LEC; 1; 6	LEC; 2; 3	CVR; 1; 3	CVR; 2; 4	INJ; 1; 9	INJ; 2 Ret	INJ; 3; 7	CHE; 1; 1	CHE; 2; 3	CHE; 3; 1	ZHZ; 1; 3	ZHZ; 2; 5	ZHZ; 3; 10	MAC; 1	MAC; 2		3rd*	406*

^{*} Season still in progress.

=== Complete Stock Car Pro Series results ===
(key) (Races in bold indicate pole position; results in italics indicate fastest lap)

Year	Team	Car	1	2	3	4	5	6	7	8	9	10	11	12	13	14	15	16	17	18	19	20	21	22	23	24	Rank	Points
2023	Scuderia Chiarelli	Toyota Corolla	GOI; 1	GOI; 2	INT; 1	INT; 2	TAR; 1	TAR; 2	CAS; 1	CAS; 2	INT; 1	INT; 2	VCA; 1	VCA; 2	GOI; 1	GOI; 2	VEL; 1 WD	VEL; 2 WD	BUE; 1 Ret	BUE; 2 Ret	VCA; 1	VCA; 2	CAS; 1	CAS; 2	INT; 1	INT; 2	38th	0

Sporting positions
Preceded by Spencer Pigot	Pro Mazda Championship; Champion; 2015	Succeeded by Aaron Telitz
