= Indy Grand Prix of Alabama =

IndyCar Series race held in Alabama, USA

Children’s of Alabama Indy Grand Prix

IndyCar Series
- Venue: Barber Motorsports Park
- Location: Birmingham, Alabama
- Corporate sponsor: Children's of Alabama
- First race: 2010
- Distance: 214.2 miles (344.7 km)
- Laps: 90
- Most wins (driver): Josef Newgarden; Álex Palou (3)
- Most wins (team): Team Penske (8)
- Most wins (manufacturer): Chassis: Dallara (15); Engine: Chevrolet (8)

The Children’s of Alabama Indy Grand Prix is an IndyCar Series race held at Barber Motorsports Park, a 17-turn 2.38-mile (3.83 km) road course, in Birmingham, Alabama, United States. Officially announced on July 27, 2009, the inaugural event was on the weekend of April 9–11, 2010. The event is under the management of the local group Zoom Motorsports. The venue is designed to allow for nearly 100,000 spectators and will have an estimated economic impact on Greater Birmingham of $30 million.

== History ==
Having an IRL race at Barber became a possibility in 2007 when the league had testing session at the facility on October 12, 2007. The test would also serve in evaluating the track as a potential site for a race beginning in the 2009 season. By July 2008, IRL revealed its 2009 schedule with new races being held at Long Beach and Toronto, but not at Barber. However local officials indicated that Barber was under strong consideration for a 2010 date.

Due to the success of the testing session in 2007, Barber was selected for a full-field, three-day testing session in March 2009. Officials remained confident that the track would gain a race in the future due to the desire of the IRL to expand into the South, as well as the location of the Honda Manufacturing of Alabama plant in nearby Lincoln, Honda being an official engine supplier of IRL.

The opportunity to pursue the event came after the Detroit Indy Grand Prix was discontinued. Initially, Zoom Motorsports looked to have the Detroit race moved to Alabama for the 2009 season; however, the league decided in February 2009 to not replace the event on its schedule. With an open date available for 2010, Birmingham made its pitch to IRL officials and was selected to hold the event over Cleveland (Burke Lakefront Airport), Houston, Baltimore, Nashville, Charlotte and Portland. IRL cited both strong support from both local and state government in addition to the large crowd that attended an IRL training session in March 2009 as factors in Birmingham being selected for the race.

== Past winners ==
Season	Date	Driver	Team	Chassis	Engine	Tires	Race Distance		Race Time	Average Speed (mph)	Report	Ref
Season	Date	Driver	Team	Chassis	Engine	Tires	Laps	Miles (km)	Race Time	Average Speed (mph)	Report	Ref
2010	April 11	(Brazil) Hélio Castroneves	Team Penske	Dallara	Honda	Firestone	90	214.2 (344.721)	1:56:41	106.436	Report	
2011	April 10	(Australia) Will Power	Team Penske (2)	Dallara	Honda	Firestone	90	214.2 (344.721)	2:14:43	92.194	Report	
2012	April 1	(Australia) Will Power (2)	Team Penske (3)	Dallara	Chevrolet	Firestone	90	214.2 (344.721)	2:01:40	102.081	Report	
2013	April 7	(United States) Ryan Hunter-Reay	Andretti Autosport	Dallara	Chevrolet	Firestone	90	214.2 (344.721)	1:52:05	110.818	Report	
2014	April 27	(United States) Ryan Hunter-Reay (2)	Andretti Autosport (2)	Dallara	Honda	Firestone	69*	164.22 (264.286)	1:40:43	94.537	Report	
2015	April 26	(United States) Josef Newgarden	CFH Racing	Dallara	Chevrolet	Firestone	90	214.2 (344.721)	1:55:53	107.176	Report	
2016	April 24	(France) Simon Pagenaud	Team Penske (4)	Dallara	Chevrolet	Firestone	90	214.2 (344.721)	1:48:42	114.254	Report	
2017	April 23	(United States) Josef Newgarden (2)	Team Penske (5)	Dallara	Chevrolet	Firestone	90	214.2 (344.721)	1:54:09	108.809	Report	
2018	April 22/23	(United States) Josef Newgarden (3)	Team Penske (6)	Dallara	Chevrolet	Firestone	82*	195.16 (314.06)	2:01:14	93.335	Report	
2019	April 7	(Japan) Takuma Sato	Rahal Letterman Lanigan Racing	Dallara	Honda	Firestone	90	214.2 (344.721)	1:55:46	107.272	Report	
2020	April 5	Canceled due to the COVID-19 pandemic										
2021	April 18	(Spain) Álex Palou	Chip Ganassi Racing	Dallara	Honda	Firestone	90	214.2 (344.721)	1:52:53	110.025	Report	
2022	May 1	(Mexico) Pato O'Ward	Arrow McLaren SP	Dallara	Chevrolet	Firestone	90	214.2 (344.721)	1:48:39	114.304	Report	
2023	April 30	(New Zealand) Scott McLaughlin	Team Penske (7)	Dallara	Chevrolet	Firestone	90	214.2 (344.721)	1:47:58	115.019	Report	
2024	April 28	(New Zealand) Scott McLaughlin (2)	Team Penske (8)	Dallara	Chevrolet	Firestone	90	214.2 (344.721)	1:56:45	110.081	Report	
2025	May 4	(Spain) Álex Palou (2)	Chip Ganassi Racing (2)	Dallara	Honda	Firestone	90	214.2 (344.721)	1:46:33	116.562	Report	
2026	March 29	(Spain) Álex Palou (3)	Chip Ganassi Racing (3)	Dallara	Honda	Firestone	90	214.2 (344.721)	1:45:58	117.210	Report	

=== Notes ===
- 2014: Race postponed same day and shortened to 100 minutes due to lightning and darkness policy.
- 2018: Race suspended until Monday after 23 laps due to heavy rain. The race was resumed as a timed race with 75 minutes remaining.
- 2021: Race rescheduled from April 11 to April 18 after the Grand Prix of Long Beach was rescheduled and to allow for network television coverage.

=== Indy Lights/Indy NXT winners ===
Season	Date	Winning driver	Winning team
2010	April 11	(France) Jean-Karl Vernay	Sam Schmidt Motorsports
2011	April 10	(Spain) Víctor García	Team Moore Racing
2012	April 1	(Colombia) Sebastián Saavedra	Conquest Racing
2013	April 7	(Colombia) Carlos Muñoz	Andretti Autosport
2014	April 26	(United States) Zach Veach	Andretti Autosport
2014	April 27	(Colombia) Gabby Chaves	Belardi Auto Racing
2015	April 25	(United States) Spencer Pigot	Juncos Racing
2015	April 26	(United States) Spencer Pigot	Juncos Racing
2016	April 25	(United Arab Emirates) Ed Jones	Carlin
2016	April 26	(Uruguay) Santiago Urrutia	Schmidt Peterson Motorsports
2017	April 22	(France) Nico Jamin	Andretti Autosport
2017	April 23	(United States) Colton Herta	Andretti Steinbrenner Racing
2018	April 21	(Mexico) Patricio O'Ward	Andretti Autosport
2018	April 22	(Mexico) Patricio O'Ward	Andretti Autosport
2019	Not Held		
2020	April 4	Canceled due to the COVID-19 pandemic	
2020	April 5	Canceled due to the COVID-19 pandemic	
2021	April 17	(Sweden) Linus Lundqvist	Global Racing Group with HMD Motorsports
2021	April 18	(United States) David Malukas	HMD Motorsports
2022	May 1	(Sweden) Linus Lundqvist	HMD Motorsports with Dale Coyne Racing
Indy NXT
2023	April 30	(Denmark) Christian Rasmussen	HMD Motorsports with Dale Coyne Racing
2024	April 28	(United States) Jacob Abel	Abel Motorsports
2025	May 4	(Norway) Dennis Hauger	Andretti Global
2026	March 28	(United States) Nikita Johnson	Cape Motorsports Powered by ECR
2026	March 29	(Argentina) Alessandro de Tullio	A. J. Foyt Racing

Preceded by Grand Prix of Arlington	IndyCar Series; Indy Grand Prix of Alabama	Succeeded by Grand Prix of Long Beach
