= Belardi Auto Racing =

Racing team

- Folded: November 10, 2020
- Base: Brownsburg, Indiana
- Team principal(s): Brian Belardi
- Former series: U.S. F2000 National Championship; Indy Lights
- Drivers' Championships: 1: Indy Lights

Belardi Auto Racing was an American racing team in the Indy Lights series. The team was owned by Brian Belardi, who competed in the Sports Car Club of America (SCCA). Belardi was previously located in Illinois before moving to Brownsburg, Indiana.

== Indy Lights ==
=== 2011-2013 ===
Jorge Goncalvez, Anders Krohn, and Jacob Wilson drove for the team during the 2011 Indy Lights season. Alon Day joined the team for the 2012 Indy Lights season and became the first racer from Israel in the United States. Peter Dempsey joined the team during the 2012 Indy Lights season and remained with the team into the 2013 Indy Lights season Belardi Auto Racing won its first race at the 2013 Firestone Freedom 100 with Peter Dempsey making a four wide pass at the finish line. It was the closest oval configuration finish in Indianapolis Motor Speedway history. The team was forced to let go of Peter Dempsey before the final two races of 2013 due to a lack of sponsorship. Juan Pablo Garcia replaced Peter Dempsey, joining Jorge Goncalvez and Giancarlo Serenelli.

=== 2014 ===
For the 2014 Indy Lights season, Belardi hired drivers Alexandre Baron and Gabby Chaves. Belardi won the 2014 Freedom 100 with driver Gabby Chaves. Chase Austin fractured his wrist in an accident while driving for Belardi in the 2014 Freedom 100. Chaves also won at the Toyota Grand Prix of Long Beach Long Beach 100, Barber Motorsports Park Legacy Indy Lights 100 race 2, and Pocono 100. Alexandre Baron missed the Pocono race but won at Honda Indy Toronto. Baron was replaced by Axcil Jefferies at the Mid-Ohio double-header and Ryan Phinny for Sonoma. Gabby Chaves won the 2014 Indy Lights championship over Jack Harvey at Sonoma in a tiebreaker.

=== 2015 ===
For the 2015 Indy Lights season, Belardi hired drivers Juan Piedrahita and Felix Serralles. Serralles won at Milwaukee with teammate Piedrahita finishing third. Serralles finished seventh and Piedrahita eighth in the final standings.

=== 2016 ===
For the 2016 Indy Lights season, Belardi hired drivers Felix Rosenqvist and Zach Veach. Both drivers suffered car issues during race one at the Indy Lights Grand Prix of St. Petersburg. Rosenqvist won race two at the Indy Lights Grand Prix of St. Petersburg with teammate Veach finishing third. He would miss both Road America and Iowa due to racing in Europe, and was replaced by James French at Road America. Zach Veach won the pole and race one at Road America, leading all 20 laps. Rosenqvist in his return would win both races at Toronto, and then left the team due to his Formula E obligations. Veach would start from fifth, take the lead on the first lap, and win Watkins Glen. Pre-race, Veach's car suffered from clutch and starter issues. Veach would start from fourth, take the lead on the first lap, and also win at the Grand Prix of Monterey (Sunday), the final race of the season.

=== 2017 ===
For the 2017 Indy Lights season, Belardi expanded to three cars, along with hiring drivers Shelby Blackstock, 2016 Pro Mazda Championship winner Aaron Telitz, and Santiago Urrutia. Telitz won the Saturday St. Petersburg race from the pole and Urrutia finished second on Sunday. In April, Belardi and IndyCar Series team Schmidt Peterson Motorsports created a development program for Santiago Urrutia, with his car carrying the Arrow Electronics colors. Chad Boat joined the team for races at Iowa and Gateway, but could not race at Iowa due to medical issues. Urrutia won Mid-Ohio Race 1 from the pole and finished second in Race 2, with Blackstock finishing third in 2. Urrutia won at Gateway, but Belardi drivers including Boat were in several accidents. Telitz won the 2017 season finale at Watkins Glen in wet conditions.

=== 2018 ===
For the 2018 Indy Lights season, Belardi retained driver Aaron Telitz, who at signing had budget concerns. Telitz won the pole for St. Petersburg Race 1, but severely damaged the car qualifying for Race 2, and did not start Race 1. Due to having no backup, Belardi borrowed a car from Carlin, and Telitz wrecked in Race 2. Urrutia won St. Petersburg Race 2. Chris Windom was to race for the team in the Freedom 100, but wrecked his car in testing, and could not compete. Urrutia started from the pole and won Toronto race 2 leading every lap.

=== 2019 ===
For the 2019 Indy Lights season, Belardi hired drivers Zachary Claman DeMelo, Julien Falchero, and Lucas Kohl. Claman DeMelo started from the pole and won St. Petersburg Race 1. Chris Windom joined the team for the Freedom 100, in partnership with Jonathan Byrd's Racing. Aaron Telitz joined the team for the Freedom 100 due to another driver having contract issues. Windom raced as planned in the Freedom 100 despite suffering a serious sprint car accident the day before. He would also have a serious accident in the Freedom 100. Telitz's car suffered issues and not start the race. Telitz would win the pole and race at Toronto Race 1.

=== 2020 ===
Belardi was to compete in the 2020 Indy Lights series, but it was cancelled due to COVID-19. The team closed in November 2020 due to various reasons, including the owner's health. Belardi's assets would later be sold to TJ Speed Motorsports.

== IndyCar ==
=== 2018 ===
Belardi joined with A. J. Foyt Enterprises, Hollinger MotorSport (Brad Hollinger), and Jonathan Byrd's Racing to enter driver James Davison in the 2018 Indianapolis 500. Davison wrecked on Fast Friday, but the team repaired the car for Saturday qualifying, and almost didn't make the race. They would qualify 19th for race, but finish 33rd after wrecking in turns 3 and 4 on lap 47 due to car issues.

=== 2019 ===
Belardi joined with Dale Coyne Racing, Hollinger MotorSport (Brad Hollinger), and Jonathan Byrd's Racing to enter driver James Davison in the 2019 Indianapolis 500. Davison qualified 15th, and despite a pit lane accident finished 12th.

=== 2020 ===
Belardi joined with Dale Coyne Racing, Jonathan Byrd's Racing, and Rick Ware Racing to enter driver James Davison in the 2020 Indianapolis 500. Davison qualified 27th, but finished 33rd due to a brake failure and subsequent wheel fire.

== Complete Racing Results ==
=== Indy Lights ===
(key)

Year	Chassis	Engine	Drivers	No.	1	2	3	4	5	6	7	8	9	10	11	12	13	14	15	16	17	18	Points		Position	
2011					STP	ALA	LBH	INDY	MIL	IOW	TOR	EDM	EDM	TRO	NHA	BAL	KTY	LSV					D.C.	T.C.	D.C.	T.C.
2011	Dallara	Nissan VRH	(Venezuela) Jorge Goncalvez (R)	4	11	4	10	11	3	6	6	7	12	9	2	16	3	3					371	—	5th	—
2011	Dallara	Nissan VRH	(Norway) Anders Krohn (R)	9	5	9	8	12	9	11	5	13	6	6	11	6	13	7					328	—	7th	—
2011	Dallara	Nissan VRH	(United States) Jacob Wilson (R)	19													9	4					54	—	22nd	—
2012					STP	ALA	LBH	INDY	DET	MIL	IOW	TOR	EDM	TRO	BAL	FON							D.C.	T.C.	D.C.	T.C.
2012	Dallara	Nissan VRH	(Venezuela) Jorge Goncalvez	4	11	10	9	12	DNS	9	6	9	11	7	7	13							247	—	10th	—
2012	Dallara	Nissan VRH	(Israel) Alon Day (R)	9	12	6	11	8	8	7	DNS												147	—	12th	—
2012	Dallara	Nissan VRH	(Republic of Ireland) Peter Dempsey	9								4	5	11	5	12							164	—	11th	—
2012	Dallara	Nissan VRH	(United States) Mike Larrison (R)	19				9		13	11					9							80	—	14th	—
2013					STP	ALA	LBH	INDY	MIL	IOW	POC	MOH	BAL	HOU	FON								D.C.	T.C.	D.C.	T.C.
2013	Dallara	Nissan VRH	(Venezuela) Jorge Goncalvez	4	6	5	4	6	7	5	8	8	9	5	4	5							336	—	6th	—
2013	Dallara	Nissan VRH	(Republic of Ireland) Peter Dempsey	5	2	6	10	1	6	4	7	2	2	4									360	—	5th	—
2013	Dallara	Nissan VRH	(Mexico) Juan Pablo García	5											8	6							312	—	8th	—
2013	Dallara	Nissan VRH	(Venezuela) Giancarlo Serenelli (R)	6									11	7	7	7							97	—	10th	—
2014					STP	LBH	ALA		IMS		INDY	POC	TOR	MOH		MIL	SNM						D.C.	T.C.	D.C.	T.C.
2014	Dallara	Nissan VRH	(United States) Chase Austin (R)	0							11												1	357	17th	3rd
2014	Dallara	Nissan VRH	(France) Alexandre Baron (R)	4	10	6	5	2	5	3	7		1*										261	357	10th	3rd
2014	Dallara	Nissan VRH	(Zimbabwe) Axcil Jefferies (R)	4										6	4								60	357	14th	3rd
2014	Dallara	Nissan VRH	(United States) Ryan Phinny (R)	4									11	12	7		10	6					91	357	12th	3rd
2014	Dallara	Nissan VRH	(Colombia) Gabby Chaves	5	2	1*	6	1*	11	8	1	1*	2	2	3	3	2	2					547	357	1st	3rd
2015					STP		LBH	ALA		IMS		INDY	TOR		MIL	IOW	MOH		LAG				D.C.	T.C.	D.C.	T.C.
2015	Dallara IL-15	Mazda-AER MZR-R 2.0 Turbo I4	(Puerto Rico) Félix Serrallés (R)	4	13	8	3	6	4	9	11	11	DSQ	7	1	10	10	5	13	8			225	202	7th	4th
2015	Dallara IL-15	Mazda-AER MZR-R 2.0 Turbo I4	(Colombia) Juan Piedrahita	5	6	9	8	7	8	11	7	7	10	4	3	7	6	12	7	7			223	202	8th	4th
2016					STP		PHX	ALA		IMS		INDY	ROA		IOW	TOR		MOH		WGL	LAG		D.C.	T.C.	D.C.	T.C.
2016	Dallara IL-15	Mazda-AER MZR-R 2.0 Turbo I4	(United States) Zach Veach (R)	5	16*	3	8	3	10	5	10	10	1*	3	2*	9	6	5	4	1*	3	1*	332	322	4th	3rd
2016	Dallara IL-15	Mazda-AER MZR-R 2.0 Turbo I4	(Sweden) Felix Rosenqvist (R)	14	7	1*	15	14	8	4	6	9				1*	1*						185	322	12th	3rd
2016	Dallara IL-15	Mazda-AER MZR-R 2.0 Turbo I4	(United States) James French (R)	45									8	8									26	322	20th	3rd
2017					STP		ALA		IMS		INDY	ROA		IOW	TOR		MOH		GAT	LAG			D.C.	T.C.	D.C.	T.C.
2017	Dallara IL-15	Mazda-AER MZR-R 2.0 Turbo I4	(Uruguay) Santiago Urrutia	5	13	2	15	13	7	2	5	2	11	2	3	11	1*	2	1	2			310	393	2nd	1st
2017	Dallara IL-15	Mazda-AER MZR-R 2.0 Turbo I4	(United States) Aaron Telitz (R)	9	1*	5	13	5	6	13	2	11	5	9	5	2	8	5	15	1*			271	393	6th	1st
2017	Dallara IL-15	Mazda-AER MZR-R 2.0 Turbo I4	(United States) Shelby Blackstock	51	4	6	7	8	9	14	11	8	6	13	11	13	4	3	9	12			207	393	10th	1st
2017	Dallara IL-15	Mazda-AER MZR-R 2.0 Turbo I4	(United States) Chad Boat (R)	84															14				7	393	16th	1st
2018					STP		ALA		IMS		INDY	ROA		IOW	TOR		MOH		GAT	POR			D.C.	T.C.	D.C.	T.C.
2018	Dallara IL-15	Mazda-AER MZR-R 2.0 Turbo I4	(Uruguay) Santiago Urrutia	5	2	1	3	5	2*	4*	4	4	7	3	2	1*	6	4	4	4	3		395	455	3rd	2nd
2018	Dallara IL-15	Mazda-AER MZR-R 2.0 Turbo I4	(United States) Aaron Telitz	9	DNS	9	8	4	3	2	6	5	3	7	4	3	7	7	5	6	2		316	455	6th	2nd

=== IndyCar Series ===
(key)

Year	Chassis	Engine	Drivers	No.	1	2	3	4	5	6	7	8	9	10	11	12	13	14	15	16	17	Pos.	Pts.
A. J. Foyt Enterprises w/ Byrd / Hollinger / Belardi
2018					STP	PHX	LBH	ALA	IMS	INDY	DET	DET	TEX	ROA	IOW	TOR	MOH	POC	GAT	POR	SNM		
2018	Dallara DW12	Chevrolet IndyCar V6t	(Australia) James Davison R	33						33												41st	10
Dale Coyne Racing w/ Byrd/Hollinger/Belardi
2019					STP	COA	ALA	LBH	IMS	INDY	DET	DET	TEX	ROA	TOR	IOW	MOH	POC	GAT	POR	LAG		
2019	Dallara DW12	Chevrolet IndyCar V6t	(Australia) James Davison R	33						12												28th	36
Dale Coyne Racing with Rick Ware Racing & Byrd Belardi
2020					TEX	IMS	ROA	ROA	IOW	IOW	INDY	GTW	GTW	MOH	MOH	IMS	IMS	STP					
2020	Dallara DW12	Honda HI20TT V6t	(Australia) James Davison R	51							33											34th	10

* Season still in progress
