= 2016 New Zealand Grand Prix =

- Race 3, Round 5 of 5 of the 2016 Toyota Racing Series

Race details
- Date: 14 February 2016
- Official name: LXI New Zealand Grand Prix
- Location: Manfeild Autocourse, Feilding, New Zealand
- Course: Permanent racing facility
- Course length: 3.033 km (1.885 miles)
- Distance: 35 laps, 106.16 km (65.96 miles)
- Weather: Fine

Pole position
Driver	(United Kingdom) Lando Norris	M2 Competition
- Time: 1:02.145

Fastest lap
Driver	(Austria) Ferdinand Habsburg	Giles Motorsport
- Time: 1:03.097 on lap 31

Podium
First	(United Kingdom) Lando Norris	M2 Competition
Second	(Russia) Artem Markelov	M2 Competition
Third	(Austria) Ferdinand Habsburg	Giles Motorsport

The 2016 New Zealand Grand Prix event for open wheel racing cars was held at Manfeild Autocourse near Feilding on 14 February 2016. It was the sixty-first New Zealand Grand Prix and was open to Toyota Racing Series cars. The event was also the third race of the fifth round of the 2016 Toyota Racing Series, the final race of the series.

Twenty Tatuus-Toyota cars started the race which was won by 16-year-old Briton Lando Norris who became the fourth teenager in as many years to claim the Grand Prix after Mitch Evans, Nick Cassidy and Lance Stroll.

Norris took pole position and won the race from Russian Artem Markelov and Austrian Ferdinand Habsburg; Habsburg also achieved the fastest lap of the race.

== Classification ==
=== Qualifying ===
Pos	No	Driver	Team	Qualifying 1	Qualifying 2	Gap
1	31	(United Kingdom) Lando Norris	M2 Competition	1:02.522	1:02.145	
2	5	(Brazil) Pedro Piquet	M2 Competition	1:02.554	1:02.162	+ 0.017 s
3	6	(India) Jehan Daruvala	M2 Competition	1:02.492	1:02.162	+ 0.017 s
4	10	(Russia) Artem Markelov	M2 Competition	1:02.800	1:02.276	+ 0.131 s
5	40	(New Zealand) James Munro	Giles Motorsport	1:02.751	1:02.416	+ 0.271 s
6	62	(Austria) Ferdinand Habsburg	Giles Motorsport	1:02.767	1:02.505	+ 0.360 s
7	15	(Canada) Kami Laliberté	M2 Competition	1:03.016	1:02.533	+ 0.388 s
8	49	(Australia) Thomas Randle	Victory Motor Racing	No Time	1:02.576	+ 0.431 s
9	11	(New Zealand) Taylor Cockerton	ETEC Motorsport	1:03.025	1:02.659	+ 0.514 s
10	17	(Canada) Devlin DeFrancesco	Giles Motorsport	1:03.041	1:02.660	+ 0.515 s
11	25	(Brazil) Bruno Baptista	Victory Motor Racing	1:03.146	1:02.681	+ 0.536 s
12	33	(China) Guanyu Zhou	M2 Competition	1:03.089	1:02.732	+ 0.587 s
13	86	(New Zealand) Brendon Leitch	Victory Motor Racing	1:03.159	1:02.740	+ 0.595 s
14	67	(Poland) Antoni Ptak	Giles Motorsport	1:03.185	1:02.768	+ 0.623 s
15	18	(Germany) Julian Hanses	Victory Motor Racing	1:03.109	1:02.830	+ 0.685 s
16	26	(France) Timothé Buret	ETEC Motorsport	1:03.238	1:02.998	+ 0.853 s
17	23	(United States) Will Owen	Giles Motorsport	1:03.509	1:03.097	+ 0.952 s
18	13	(Brazil) Rodrigo Baptista	ETEC Motorsport	1:03.750	1:03.118	+ 0.973 s
19	21	(Argentina) Nicolas Dapero	Giles Motorsport	1:03.621	1:03.166	+ 1.021 s
20	4	(United States) Theo Bean	ETEC Motorsport	1:03.566	1:03.197	+ 1.052 s

=== Race 1 ===
Daruvala started from pole, but Norris shot into the lead. A battle ensued between Markelov and Piquet, with them eventually making contact, putting Piquet out of the race. Markelov would later be excluded from the race as a result. On the restart, Munro moved up into second, with Habsburg in third. Another driver would find himself excluded after an incident between Theo Bean and Nicolas Dapero. The stewards had determined that Dapero did not leave enough room on exit and subsequently excluded him from the race. On the second restart, Habsburg made a brilliant move to put himself in the lead, with Norris in second and Munro third. The two Kiwi's, Leitch and Cockerton, were fighting it out for a top five finish whilst Habsburg began to pull out a lead over Norris. After a mistake from Norris, Munro passed him for second, allowing the young Kiwi to pursue Habsburg. Guanyu Zhou retired three laps from the end with terminal problems, denting his championship hopes, but out in front it was Ferdiand Habsburg who would take the win, with James Munro in second and Lando Norris in third.

Pos	No	Driver	Team	Laps	Gap	Grid
1	62	(Austria) Ferdinand Habsburg	Giles Motorsport	20	25min 35.551sec	5
2	40	(New Zealand) James Munro	Giles Motorsport	20	+ 1.003 s	4
3	31	(United Kingdom) Lando Norris	M2 Competition	20	+ 2.844 s	2
4	6	(India) Jehan Daruvala	M2 Competition	20	+ 4.333 s	1
5	86	(New Zealand) Brendon Leitch	Victory Motor Racing	20	+ 5.736 s	13
6	11	(New Zealand) Taylor Cockerton	ETEC Motorsport	20	+ 6.083 s	8
7	17	(Canada) Devlin DeFrancesco	Giles Motorsport	20	+ 9.844 s	9
8	67	(Poland) Antoni Ptak	Giles Motorsport	20	+ 10.420 s	14
9	25	(Brazil) Bruno Baptista	Victory Motor Racing	20	+ 13.249 s	12
10	26	(France) Timothe Buret	ETEC Motorsport	20	+ 14.721 s	15
11	13	(Brazil) Rodrigo Baptista	ETEC Motorsport	20	+ 15.242 s	19
12	49	(Australia) Thomas Randle	Victory Motor Racing	20	+ 16.507 s	20
13	18	(Germany) Julian Hanses	Victory Motor Racing	20	+ 20.637 s	11
14	23	(United States) Will Owen	Giles Motorsport	20	+ 26.260 s	16
15	15	(Canada) Kami Laliberté	M2 Competition	19	+ 1 lap	7
Ret	33	(China) Guanyu Zhou	M2 Competition	17	Retired	10
Ret	4	(United States) Theo Bean	ETEC Motorsport	8	Retired	17
Ret	5	(Brazil) Pedro Piquet	M2 Competition	3	Retired	3
DSQ	10	(Russia) Artem Markelov	M2 Competition	20	Disqualified	6
DSQ	21	(Argentina) Nicolas Dapero	Giles Motorsport	19	Disqualified	18

=== Race 2 ===
Pos	No	Driver	Team	Laps	Gap	Grid
1	86	(New Zealand) Brendon Leitch	Victory Motor Racing	15	16min 51.966sec	4
2	6	(India) Jehan Daruvala	M2 Competition	15	+ 0.978 s	5
3	67	(Poland) Antoni Ptak	Giles Motorsport	15	+ 2.154 s	1
4	31	(United Kingdom) Lando Norris	M2 Competition	15	+ 2.512 s	6
5	11	(New Zealand) Taylor Cockerton	ETEC Motorsport	15	+ 2.993 s	3
6	40	(New Zealand) James Munro	Giles Motorsport	15	+ 4.147 s	7
7	62	(Austria) Ferdinand Habsburg	Giles Motorsport	15	+ 5.750 s	8
8	5	(Brazil) Pedro Piquet	M2 Competition	15	+ 6.064 s	18
9	17	(Canada) Devlin DeFrancesco	Giles Motorsport	15	+ 6.613 s	2
10	33	(China) Guanyu Zhou	M2 Competition	15	+ 7.865 s	16
11	10	(Russia) Artem Markelov	M2 Competition	15	+ 11.040 s	19
12	26	(France) Timothe Buret	ETEC Motorsport	15	+ 13.187 s	10
13	15	(Canada) Kami Laliberté	M2 Competition	15	+ 13.580 s	15
14	21	(Argentina) Nicolas Dapero	Giles Motorsport	15	+ 14.083 s	20
15	23	(United States) Will Owen	Giles Motorsport	15	+ 16.450 s	14
16	4	(United States) Theo Bean	ETEC Motorsport	15	+ 17.092 s	17
17	18	(Germany) Julian Hanses	Victory Motor Racing	15	+ 18.449 s	13
18	49	(Australia) Thomas Randle	Victory Motor Racing	15	+ 19.788 s	12
19	25	(Brazil) Bruno Baptista	Victory Motor Racing	15	+ 39.836 s	9
20	13	(Brazil) Rodrigo Baptista	ETEC Motorsport	15	+ 45.700 s	11

=== Race 3 (Grand Prix) ===
Pos	No	Driver	Team	Laps	Gap	Grid
1	31	(United Kingdom) Lando Norris	M2 Competition	35	39min 43.893sec	1
2	10	(Russia) Artem Markelov	M2 Competition	35	+ 2.167 s	4
3	62	(Austria) Ferdinand Habsburg	Giles Motorsport	35	+ 2.598 s	6
4	40	(New Zealand) James Munro	Giles Motorsport	35	+ 4.741 s	5
5	49	(Australia) Thomas Randle	Victory Motor Racing	35	+ 5.236 s	8
6	11	(New Zealand) Taylor Cockerton	ETEC Motorsport	35	+ 7.101 s	9
7	6	(India) Jehan Daruvala	M2 Competition	35	+ 11.225 s	3
8	15	(Canada) Kami Laliberté	M2 Competition	35	+ 12.160 s	7
9	25	(Brazil) Bruno Baptista	Victory Motor Racing	35	+ 16.611 s	11
10	86	(New Zealand) Brendon Leitch	Victory Motor Racing	35	+ 20.411 s	13
11	13	(Brazil) Rodrigo Baptista	ETEC Motorsport	35	+ 20.568 s	18
12	18	(Germany) Julian Hanses	Victory Motor Racing	35	+ 21.961 s	15
13	17	(Canada) Devlin DeFrancesco	Giles Motorsport	35	+ 22.501 s	10
14	23	(United States) Will Owen	Giles Motorsport	35	+ 23.837 s	17
15	5	(Brazil) Pedro Piquet	M2 Competition	35	+ 31.830 s	2
16	21	(Argentina) Nicolas Dapero	Giles Motorsport	35	+ 32.387 s	19
17	33	(China) Guanyu Zhou	M2 Competition	34	+ 1 Lap	12
18	26	(France) Timothe Buret	ETEC Motorsport	34	+ 1 Lap	16
Ret	4	(United States) Theo Bean	ETEC Motorsport	30	Retired	20
Ret	67	(Poland) Antoni Ptak	Giles Motorsport	6	Retired	14

Preceded by 2015 New Zealand Grand Prix	New Zealand Grand Prix; 2016	Succeeded by 2017 New Zealand Grand Prix
