= 2017 Indy Lights =

2017 Indy Lights season
- Indy Lights

Season
- Races: 16
- Start date: March 12
- End date: September 3

Awards
- Drivers' champion: (United States) Kyle Kaiser
- Teams' champion: (United States) Belardi Auto Racing
- Rookie of the Year: (United States) Colton Herta

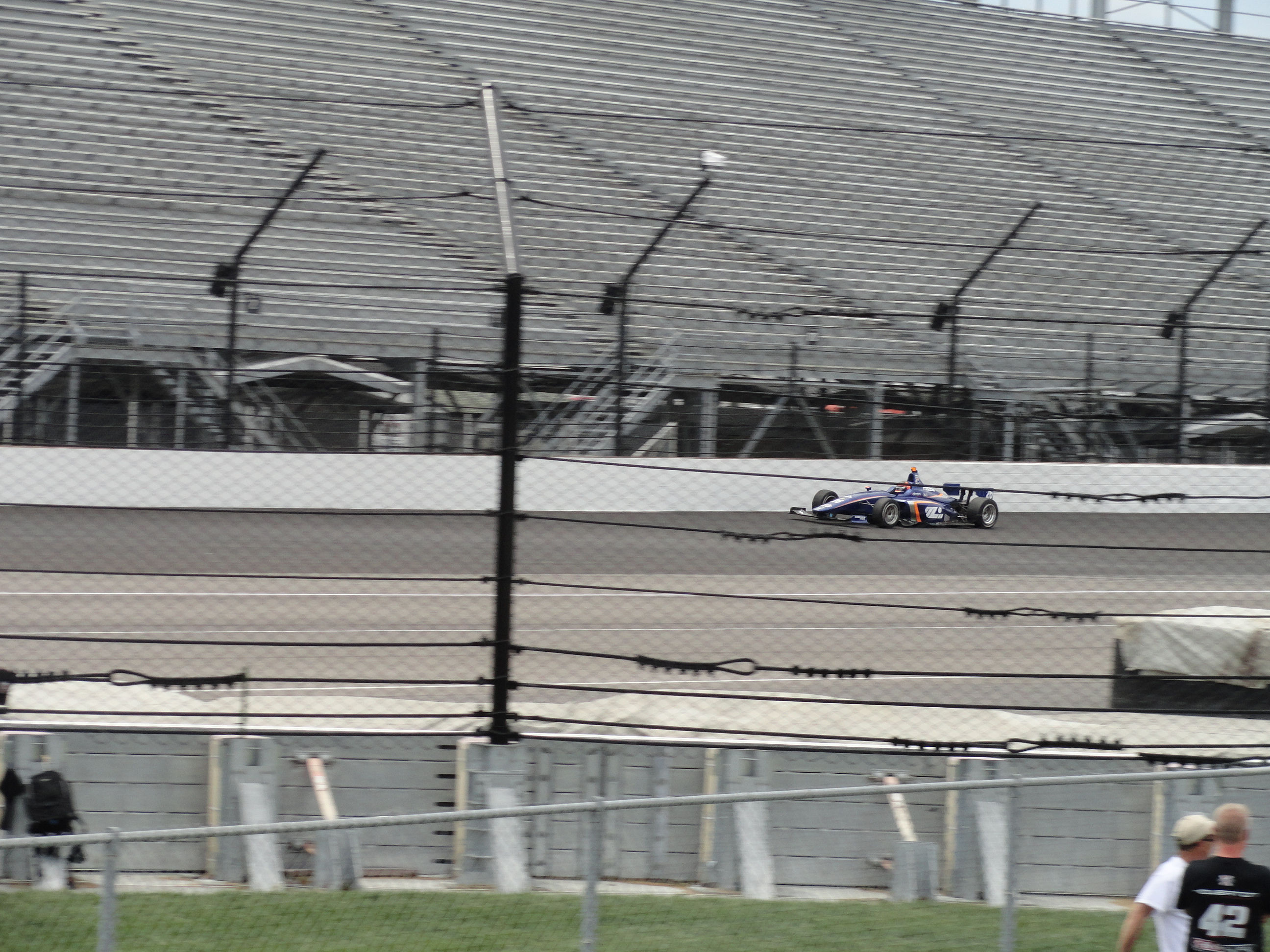
Matheus Leist, winner of the 2017 Freedom 100

The 2017 Indy Lights season was the 32nd season of the Indy Lights open wheel motor racing series and the 16th sanctioned by IndyCar, acting as the primary support series for the IndyCar Series. A 16-race schedule was announced on September 14, 2016. The schedule included a stop at Gateway Motorsports Park for the first time since 2003. This replaced the race at Phoenix International Raceway after it returned to the schedule for only a single season. The Mazda Raceway Laguna Seca round to end the season was omitted, as it was for the other Road to Indy series.

American Kyle Kaiser driving for Juncos Racing led a steady campaign where he finished every lap of the season in a season where no particular team or driver was dominant and in doing so essentially clinched the championship with one round remaining (he only had to start the final round). Kaiser won three races with an additional three podium finishes. Santiago Urrutia struggled during the first half of the season but logged six podium finishes in the last seven races, including two wins, to vault his way to second in the championship. Colton Herta won six poles, but was only able to convert that to two wins and he finished third in the championship. Brazilian rookie Matheus Leist had a brilliant stretch of races in the middle of the season, capturing three wins, but was otherwise unremarkable and wound up fourth. Zachary Claman DeMelo won a single race and finished fifth in points while 2016 Pro Mazda Championship winner Aaron Telitz bookended the season with his only two wins and finished sixth. Nico Jamin won three races but also suffered four DNFs and fell to seventh in points. Juan Piedrahita captured his first Indy Lights pole at Gateway Motorsports Park, his 57th Indy Lights start.

== Team and driver chart ==
- All drivers compete in Cooper Tire–shod Dallara chassis with Mazda AER engines.

Team	No.	Drivers	Rounds
Andretti Autosport	27	(France) Nico Jamin	All
Andretti Autosport	28	(Canada) Dalton Kellett	All
Andretti Autosport	48	(United States) Ryan Norman	All
Andretti Steinbrenner Racing	98	(United States) Colton Herta	All
Belardi Auto Racing	5	(Uruguay) Santiago Urrutia	All
Belardi Auto Racing	9	(United States) Aaron Telitz	All
Belardi Auto Racing	51	(United States) Shelby Blackstock	All
Belardi Auto Racing	84	(United States) Chad Boat	15
Carlin	11	(United States) Garth Rickards	All
Carlin	13	(Canada) Zachary Claman DeMelo	All
Carlin	22	(United States) Neil Alberico	All
Carlin	26	(Brazil) Matheus Leist	All
Juncos Racing	18	(United States) Kyle Kaiser	All
Juncos Racing	31	(Argentina) Nicolás Dapero	All
Team Pelfrey	2	(Colombia) Juan Piedrahíta	All
Team Pelfrey	3	(Mexico) Patricio O'Ward	1–4

== Schedule ==
Rd.	Date	Race name	Track	Location
1	March 11	(United States) St. Petersburg 100	Streets of St. Petersburg	St. Petersburg, Florida
2	March 12	(United States) St. Petersburg 100	Streets of St. Petersburg	St. Petersburg, Florida
3	April 22	(United States) Legacy Indy Lights 100	Barber Motorsports Park	Birmingham, Alabama
4	April 23	(United States) Legacy Indy Lights 100	Barber Motorsports Park	Birmingham, Alabama
5	May 12	(United States) Grand Prix of Indianapolis	Indianapolis Motor Speedway road course	Speedway, Indiana
6	May 13	(United States) Grand Prix of Indianapolis	Indianapolis Motor Speedway road course	Speedway, Indiana
7	May 26	(United States) Freedom 100	Indianapolis Motor Speedway oval	Speedway, Indiana
8	June 24	(United States) Grand Prix of Road America	Road America	Elkhart Lake, Wisconsin
9	June 25	(United States) Grand Prix of Road America	Road America	Elkhart Lake, Wisconsin
10	July 9	(United States) Mazda Iowa 100	Iowa Speedway	Newton, Iowa
11	July 15	(Canada) Grand Prix of Toronto	Exhibition Place	Toronto, Ontario, Canada
12	July 16	(Canada) Grand Prix of Toronto	Exhibition Place	Toronto, Ontario, Canada
13	July 29	(United States) Grand Prix of Mid-Ohio	Mid-Ohio Sports Car Course	Lexington, Ohio
14	July 30	(United States) Grand Prix of Mid-Ohio	Mid-Ohio Sports Car Course	Lexington, Ohio
15	August 26	(United States) Illinois 100	Gateway Motorsports Park	Madison, Illinois
16	September 3	(United States) Grand Prix of Watkins Glen	Watkins Glen International	Watkins Glen, New York

== Race results ==
Round	Race	Pole position	Fastest lap	Most laps led	Race Winner	
Round	Race	Pole position	Fastest lap	Most laps led	Driver	Team
1	St. Petersburg 1	(United States) Aaron Telitz	(United States) Colton Herta	(United States) Aaron Telitz	(United States) Aaron Telitz	Belardi Auto Racing
2	St. Petersburg 2	(United States) Colton Herta	(United States) Colton Herta	(United States) Colton Herta	(United States) Colton Herta	Andretti Steinbrenner Racing
3	Birmingham 1	(United States) Kyle Kaiser	(France) Nico Jamin	(France) Nico Jamin	(France) Nico Jamin	Andretti Autosport
4	Birmingham 2	(United States) Colton Herta^{1}	(Uruguay) Santiago Urrutia	(United States) Colton Herta	(United States) Colton Herta	Andretti Steinbrenner Racing
5	Indianapolis GP 1	(France) Nico Jamin	(Brazil) Matheus Leist	(France) Nico Jamin	(France) Nico Jamin	Andretti Autosport
6	Indianapolis GP 2	(United States) Kyle Kaiser	(Canada) Zachary Claman DeMelo	(United States) Kyle Kaiser	(United States) Kyle Kaiser	Juncos Racing
7	Indianapolis	(Brazil) Matheus Leist	(Uruguay) Santiago Urrutia	(Brazil) Matheus Leist	(Brazil) Matheus Leist	Carlin
8	Road America 1	(Brazil) Matheus Leist	(United States) Kyle Kaiser	(Brazil) Matheus Leist	(Brazil) Matheus Leist	Carlin
9	Road America 2	(United States) Colton Herta	(Canada) Zachary Claman DeMelo	(Canada) Zachary Claman DeMelo	(Canada) Zachary Claman DeMelo	Carlin
10	Iowa	(United States) Colton Herta	(Canada) Dalton Kellett	(Brazil) Matheus Leist	(Brazil) Matheus Leist	Carlin
11	Toronto 1	(United States) Kyle Kaiser	(United States) Colton Herta	(United States) Kyle Kaiser	(United States) Kyle Kaiser	Juncos Racing
12	Toronto 2	(United States) Colton Herta	(United States) Kyle Kaiser	(United States) Colton Herta	(United States) Kyle Kaiser	Juncos Racing
13	Mid-Ohio 1	(Uruguay) Santiago Urrutia	(United States) Shelby Blackstock	(Uruguay) Santiago Urrutia	(Uruguay) Santiago Urrutia	Belardi Auto Racing
14	Mid-Ohio 2	(United States) Colton Herta	(Uruguay) Santiago Urrutia	(France) Nico Jamin	(France) Nico Jamin	Andretti Autosport
15	Gateway	(Colombia) Juan Piedrahíta	(Canada) Zachary Claman DeMelo	(Colombia) Juan Piedrahíta	(Uruguay) Santiago Urrutia	Belardi Auto Racing
16	Watkins Glen	(United States) Colton Herta	(United States) Aaron Telitz	(United States) Aaron Telitz	(United States) Aaron Telitz	Belardi Auto Racing

^{1}Qualifying canceled due to weather and grid was set on points

== Championship standings ==
=== Drivers' championship ===
Scoring system

Position	**1st**	**2nd**	**3rd**	**4th**	**5th**	**6th**	**7th**	**8th**	**9th**	**10th**	**11th**	**12th**	**13th**	**14th**	**15th**	**16th**	**17th**	**18th**	**19th**	**20th**
Points	30	25	22	19	17	15	14	13	12	11	10	9	8	7	6	5	4	3	2	1

- The driver who qualified on pole was awarded one additional point.
- An additional point was awarded to the driver who led the most laps in a race.
- The driver who obtained the fastest lap in a race was awarded one additional point.

Pos	Driver	STP		ALA		IND		INDY	RDA		IOW	TOR		MOH		GAT	WGL	Pts
1	(United States) Kyle Kaiser	6	4	**2**	2	3	**1***	9	3	2	5	**1***	1	12	12	4	7	330
2	(Uruguay) Santiago Urrutia	13	2	15	13	7	2	5	2	11	2	3	11	**1***	2	1	2	310
3	(United States) Colton Herta RY	2	**1***	10	**1***	12	10	13	12	**3**	**4**	4	**10***	2	**6**	3	**3**	300
4	(Brazil) Matheus Leist R	15	11	4	7	5	3	**1***	**1***	4	1*	13	5	11	10	10	4	279
5	(Canada) Zachary Claman DeMelo	8	7	5	14	2	11	6	10	1*	6	2	3	5	4	6	6	274
6	(United States) Aaron Telitz R	**1***	5	13	5	6	13	2	11	5	9	5	2	8	5	15	1*	271
7	(France) Nico Jamin R	7	14	1*	3	**1***	4	10	6	14	7	14	12	3	1*	11	5	269
8	(United States) Neil Alberico	3	15	3	4	4	6	4	7	8	11	8	14	6	9	12	11	225
9	(Colombia) Juan Piedrahita	14	10	11	11	DNS	5	8	5	10	10	6	4	10	11	**2***	9	208
10	(United States) Shelby Blackstock	4	6	7	8	9	14	11	8	6	13	11	13	4	3	9	12	207
11	(United States) Ryan Norman R	10	9	12	9	8	7	14	4	7	8	10	6	9	7	8	10	200
12	(Canada) Dalton Kellett	12	12	6	10	13	9	3	9	9	3	12	9	7	13	7	13	198
13	(Argentina) Nicolás Dapero R	9	8	9	6	11	8	12	14	12	12	7	7	14	8	5	8	187
14	(United States) Garth Rickards R	11	13	14	12	10	12	7	13	13	14	9	8	13	14	13	DNS	146
15	(Mexico) Patricio O'Ward R	5	3	8	15													58
16	(United States) Chad Boat R															14		7
Pos	Driver	STP		ALA		IND		INDY	RDA		IOW	TOR		MOH		GAT	WGL	Pts

Color	Result
Gold	Winner
Silver	2nd place
Bronze	3rd place
Green	4th & 5th place
Light Blue	6th–10th place
Dark Blue	Finished (Outside Top 10)
Purple	Did not finish
Red	Did not qualify (DNQ)
Brown	Withdrawn (Wth)
Black	Disqualified (DSQ)
White	Did not start (DNS)
Blank	Did not participate (DNP)
Blank	Not competing

**In-line notation**
**Bold**	Pole position (1 point)
Italics	Ran fastest race lap (1 point)
*	Led most race laps (1 point)
^{1}	Qualifying cancelled no bonus point awarded
Rookie

- Ties in points broken by number of wins, or best finishes.

=== Teams' championship ===
Pos	Team	Points
1	(United States) Belardi Auto Racing	393
2	(United States) Andretti Autosport	389
3	(United Kingdom) Carlin	365
4	(United States) Juncos Racing	282
5	(United States) Team Pelfrey	162
