= 2019 Petit Le Mans =

Sportscar endurance race in Georgia, US

The Track map of Road Atlanta

The 2019 Petit Le Mans (formally known as the 2019 MOTUL Petit Le Mans for sponsorship reasons) was the 22nd running of the Petit Le Mans, and was held on October 12, 2019. It was the last race in the 2019 IMSA WeatherTech Sportscar Championship, and the last race of the 2019 Michelin Endurance Cup, and was run at Road Atlanta in Braselton, Georgia. The race was won overall by the #31 Whelen Engineering Racing Cadillac DPi-V.R after its sister car fell out with brake failure with less than 30 minutes remaining. The distance covered was a race record.

== Background ==
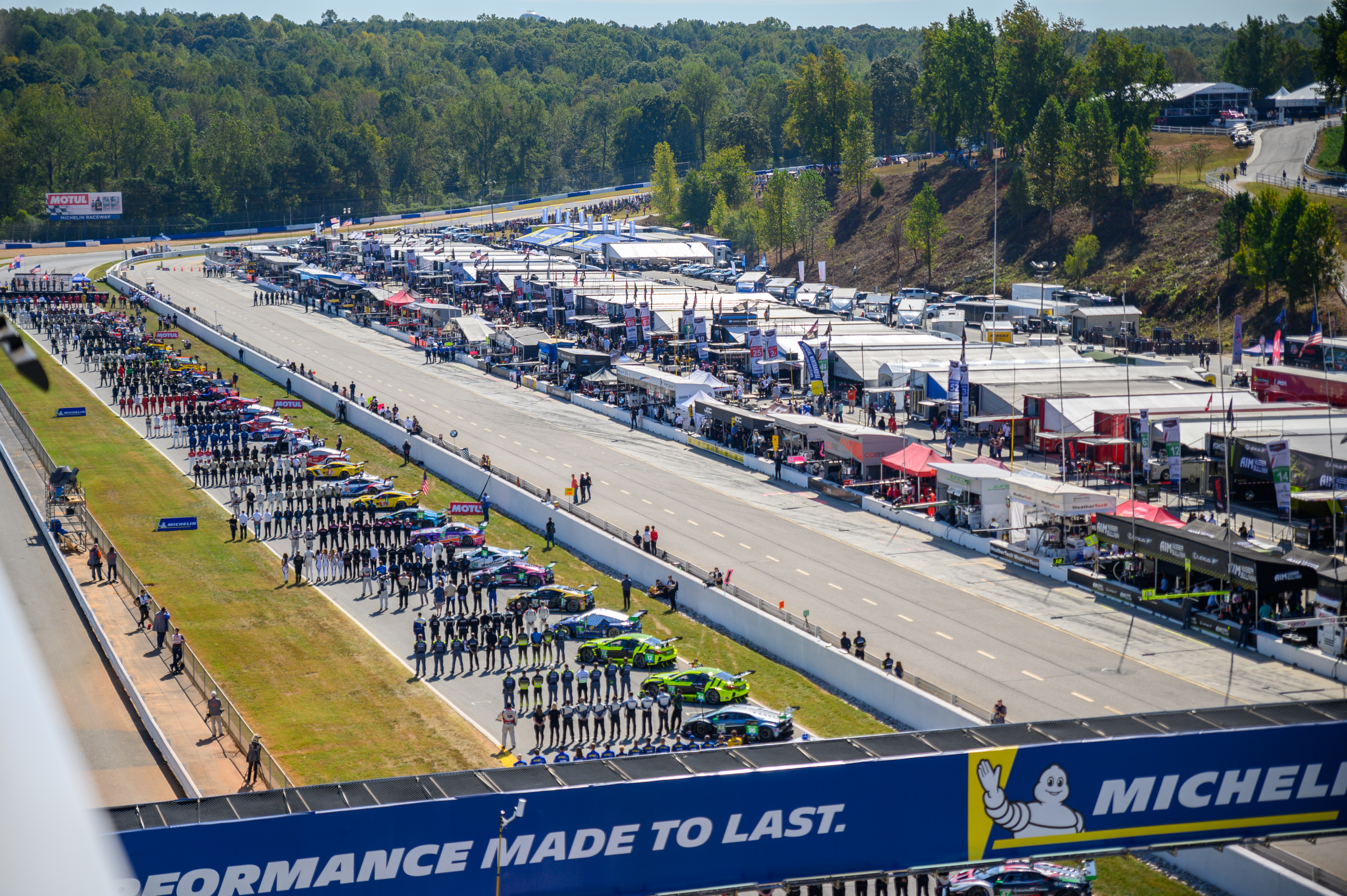
Michelin Raceway Road Atlanta, where the race was held.

International Motor Sports Association's (IMSA) president Scott Atherton confirmed the race was part of the schedule for the 2019 IMSA SportsCar Championship (IMSA SCC) in August 2018. It was the sixth consecutive year the event was held as part of the WeatherTech SportsCar Championship. The 2019 Petit Le Mans was the last of twelve sports car races of 2019 by IMSA, and it was the last of four rounds held as part of the Michelin Endurance Cup. The race took place at the 12-turn, 2.540-mile (4.088 km) Road Atlanta in Braselton, Georgia on October 12, 2019.

As the final race for the 2019 season, the race concluded IMSA's 50th anniversary season.

Scott Atherton would retire from his position as President of the International Motor Sports Association following the event. In his final race as president, Scott Atherton served as the events grand marshal. John Doonan would replace Scott Atherton as president of the International Motor Sports Association beginning in 2020.

This would be the final race for the Ford GT as Ford was ending their factory involvement following the 2019 season. The Nissan Onroak DPi made its final appearance as Jon Bennett would retire from full time driving.

The Chevrolet Corvette C7.R and Porsche 911 RSR also entered their final IMSA events, ahead of the switch to new-generation GTE machinery for both manufacturers in 2020. Chevrolet would transition to the Chevrolet Corvette C8.R, while Porsche introduced the Porsche 911 RSR-19.

Heading into the final race of the season, Dane Cameron and Juan Pablo Montoya led the DPi Drivers' Championship with 274 points; the duo held a twelve-point advantage over Pipo Derani and Felipe Nasr in second. With 235 points, Matt McMurry led the LMP2 Drivers' Championship, ahead of Cameron Cassels. In GTLM, Earl Bamber and Laurens Vanthoor led the Drivers' Championship with 304 points, 12 points ahead of Patrick Pilet and Nick Tandy. The GTD Drivers' Championship was led by Mario Farnbacher and Trent Hindman with 264 points, 32 points clear of Zacharie Robichon in second. Acura, Porsche, and Lamborghini were leading their respective Manufacturers' Championships, while Acura Team Penske, PR1/Mathiasen Motorsports, Porsche GT Team, and Meyer Shank Racing each led their own Teams' Championships.

=== Entries ===
A total of 34 cars took part in the event split across 4 classes. 11 cars were entered in DPi, 2 in LMP2, 9 in GTLM, and 12 in GTD. In DPi, Juncos Racing made its first appearance since the Canadian Tire Motorsport Park round. Graham Rahal substituted for Alexander Rossi in the No. 7 Acura Team Penske entry due to a clash with the Bathurst 1000. In GTLM, Risi Competizione returned for the first time since the season opening round at Daytona. In GTD, Park Place Motorsports were absent due to not having a spare chassis. Montaplast by Land-Motorsport and Precision Performance Motorsports made their first appearances since the Watkins Glen round. Compass Racing skipped the event. Marco Seefried joined Bryan Sellers and Corey Lewis in the Paul Miller Racing entry. Parker Chase joined Jack Hawksworth and Richard Heistand in the No. 14 AIM Vasser-Sullivan entry.

== Practice ==
There were four practice sessions preceding the start of the race on Saturday, three on Thursday and one on Friday. The first two sessions on Thursday morning and afternoon were 60 minutes and 75 minutes in length, while the third held later that evening ran for 90 minutes, and the fourth on Friday morning lasted one hour.

In the first practice session, Felipe Nasr set the fastest lap in the No. 31 Cadillac at 1 minute, 09.093 seconds, 0.642 seconds faster than Ricky Taylor's No. 7 Acura. Dane Cameron in the No. 6 Acura was third, and Colin Braun was fourth in the No. 54 Nissan. Matthieu Vaxiviere was fifth fastest for Konica Minolta Cadillac while Timo Bernhard in the No. 77 Mazda was sixth. Gabriel Aubry led LMP2 in the No. 52 PR1/ Mathiasen Motorsports Oreca 07. The GTLM class was topped by Richard Westbrook's No. 67 Ford GT with a lap of 1 minute, 16.810 seconds, 0.092 seconds faster than James Calado's No. 62 Ferrari 488. Dirk Müller was third in the No. 66 Ford GT and Nick Tandy was fourth fastest in the No. 911 Porsche. In GTD, Bill Auberlen in Turner Motorsport's No. 96 BMW M6 lapped fastest with a time of 1 minute, 19.306 seconds, with Jack Hawksworth second in the No. 14 Lexus. The session was red flagged two times. 6 minutes into the session, Hawksworth stopped on track with a puncture. The final stoppage came when Marco Seefried crashed the No. 48 Paul Miller Racing Lamborghini into the tire barrier at turn three.

In the second practice session, Cameron was fastest with a time of 1 minute, 09.095 seconds, ahead of the No. 85 Cadillac of Tristan Vautier and Albuquerque's No. 5 Mustang Sampling car. van der Zande placed the No. 10 Konica Minolta Cadillac entry fourth and Ricky Taylor's No. 7 Acura rounded out the top five. Aubry led LMP2 in the No. 52 PR1/ Mathiasen Motorsports Oreca 07. Daniel Serra led GTLM in the No. 62 Ferrari with a 1-minute, 16.708 seconds lap. Antonio García's No. 3 Corvette was second. Dixon in the No. 66 CGR Ford GT was third. Felipe Fraga No. 33 Riley Motorsports Mercedes-AMG GT3 was fastest in GTD, while Morad was 0.409 seconds slower in the No. 29 Land-Motorsport Audi. Chris Miller caused the first caused the session's first stoppage when he spun his No. 84 JDC-Miller Cadillac at turn 10a and got beached in the gravel trap. Later, Nunez, Marks, and Piedrahita spun and got their cars beached at turns 6 and 10a, respectively.

The third practice session ran at night and saw Derani's No. 31 Cadillac set the fastest time overall at 1 minute, 09.455 seconds. Albuquerque was almost two-tenths of a second behind in second, with the No. 7 Team Penske Acura of Ricky Taylor was third. Vautier in the No. 85 Cadillac was fourth and Jarvis' No. 77 Mazda was fifth. René Binder necessitated the showing of a red flag when he spun and beached the No. 50 Juncos Racing in the gravel trap at turn 10a halfway through the session. Aubry was the fastest LMP2 driver in the PR1/ Mathiasen Motorsports entry. In GTLM, Müller was fastest in class with a lap of 1 minute, 16.552 seconds. Blomqvist was second-fastest in the No. 25 BMW M8 and Briscoe took third in the No. 67 Ford GT. In GTD, Auberlen was again fastest in the class, followed by Jeroen Bleekemolen's No. 33 Riley Motorsports Mercedes-AMG GT3.

Nasr led the final session in the No. 31 WER car with a lap of 1 minute, 08.419 seconds. Ricky Taylor's No. 7 Acura was second-fastest. The No. 5 Cadillac of Albuquerque set the third-quickest lap. van der Zande's No. 10 Cadillac, along with Bernhard's No. 77 Mazda car were fourth and fifth. Misha Goikhberg necessitated the showing of a red flag when he spun and beached the No. 85 JDC-Miller Cadillac in the gravel trap at turn 10 with 17 minutes remaining in the session. Aubry was fastest again in LMP2. Calado's No. 62 Ferrari was fastest in GTlM while, Robby Foley, driving the No. 96 Turner Motorsport BMW M6, was the fastest driver in GTD.

== Qualifying ==
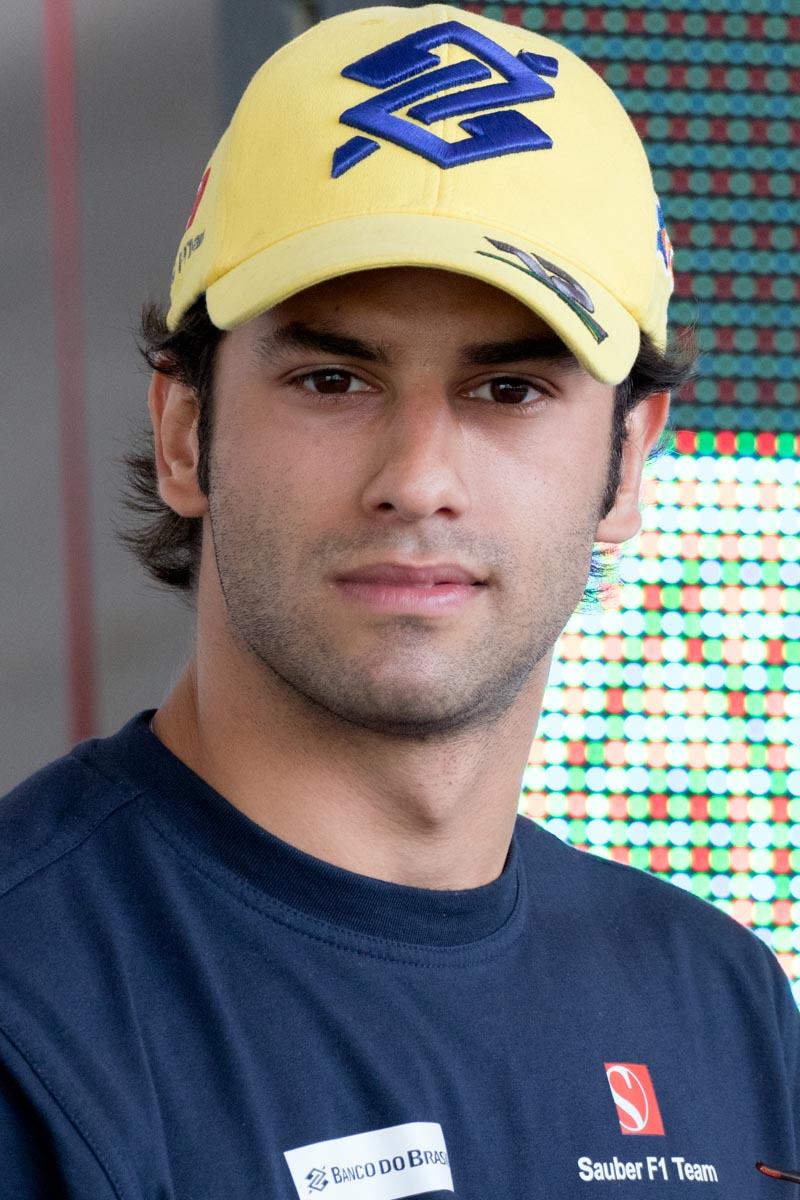
Felipe Nasr (pictured in 2015) helped put the No. 31 Cadillac on pole position in qualifying.

Friday's afternoon qualifying session was broken into three sessions that were scheduled for 15 minutes each. Cars in GTD were sent out first before those grouped in GTLM and DPi/LMP2 had two separate identically timed sessions. All cars were required to be driven by one participant and the starting order was determined by the competitor's fastest lap. IMSA then arranged the grid so that the DPi, LMP2, and GTLM cars started in front of the GTD field.

Felipe Nasr in the No. 31 Cadillac set a new track record to clinch pole position with a time of 1 minute and 08.457 seconds. He was joined on the grid's front row by Ricky Taylor's No. 7 Acura who was 0.141 seconds slower. Filipe Albuquerque qualified the No. 5 Cadillac in third, ahead of Dane Cameron's fourth-placed No. 6 Acura. The two Mazdas were fourth and fifth (the No. 77 car driven by Bernhard in front of the No. 55 vehicle of Tincknell). Trummer's No. 84 Cadillac took sixth and van der Zande's No. 10 Cadillac qualified seventh. Pigot's No. 50 Juncos Racing Cadillac took eighth, ahead of Goikhberg in the No. 85 JDC-Miller MotorSports Cadillac and the No. 54 CORE Autosport Nissan driven by Jon Bennett rounded out the DPi qualifiers. In LMP2, Masson set the fastest time in the Performance Tech Motorsports entry, with his fastest lap being 0.131 seconds faster than McMurry in the No. 52 PR1/ Mathiasen Motorsports Oreca.

In GTLM, James Calado in the No. 62 Ferrari set a new category track record to take pole position with a time of 1 minute and 15.639 seconds. García in the No. 3 Corvette set the second fastest time, but would start at the back of the GTLM field after his car failed the post-qualifying technical inspection where it was discovered that the Corvette was found to not have complied with mandated ride height. As a result, Philipp Eng would start in second position followed Vanthoor's No. 912 Porsche in third.

In GTD, Corey Lewis took his second consecutive pole position of the season with a lap of 1 minute and 19.530 seconds. He was joined by Ben Keating's No. 33 Mercedes-AMG on the grid's front row with his best lap being 0.135 second slower, and Jeff Westphal drove the No. 63 Scuderia Corsa Ferrari to third place. Justin Marks qualified the No. 86 Acura fourth, ahead of Christina Nielsen's fifth placed No. 57 Acura. The No. 96 Turner Motorsport BMW failed to record a time due to Robby Foley spinning at turn 10a and beaching the car at the gravel trap on his outlap. The No. 29 Montaplast by Land-Motorsport and No. 47 Precision Performance Motorsports entries lost all their lap times due to both teams crew touching their respective cars.

=== Qualifying results ===
Pole positions in each class are indicated in bold and by ‡.

Pos.	Class	No.	Team	Driver	Time	Gap	Grid
1	**DPi**	**31**	**(United States) Whelen Engineering Racing**	**(Brazil) Felipe Nasr**	**1:08.457**	**_**	1‡
2	DPi	7	(United States) Acura Team Penske	(United States) Ricky Taylor	1:08.598	+0.141	2
3	DPi	5	(United States) Mustang Sampling Racing	(Portugal) Filipe Albuquerque	1:08.629	+0.172	3
4	DPi	6	(United States) Acura Team Penske	(United States) Dane Cameron	1:08.802	+0.345	4
5	DPi	77	(Germany) Mazda Team Joest	(Germany) Timo Bernhard	1:08.847	+0.390	5
6	DPi	55	(Germany) Mazda Team Joest	(United Kingdom) Harry Tincknell	1:09.204	+0.747	6
7	DPi	84	(United States) JDC-Miller MotorSports	(Switzerland) Simon Trummer	1:09.243	+0.786	7
8	DPi	10	(United States) Konica Minolta Cadillac	(Netherlands) Renger van der Zande	1:09.253	+0.796	8
9	DPi	50	(Argentina) Juncos Racing	(United States) Spencer Pigot	1:09.507	+1.050	9
10	DPi	85	(United States) JDC-Miller MotorSports	(Canada) Misha Goikhberg	1:09.673	+1.216	10
11	**LMP2**	**38**	**(United States) Performance Tech Motorsports**	**(United States) Kyle Masson**	**1:10.722**	**+2.265**	12‡
12	LMP2	52	(United States) PR1/ Mathiasen Motorsports	(United States) Matt McMurry	1:10.853	+2.396	11
13	DPi	54	(United States) CORE Autosport	(United States) Jon Bennett	1:11.511	+3.054	13
14	**GTLM**	**62**	**(United States) Risi Competizione**	**(United Kingdom) James Calado**	**1:15.639**	**+7.182**	14‡
15	GTLM	3	(United States) Corvette Racing	(Spain) Antonio García	1:15.702	+7.245	22^{1}
16	GTLM	24	(United States) BMW Team RLL	(Austria) Philipp Eng	1:15.784	+7.327	15
17	GTLM	912	(United States) Porsche GT Team	(Belgium) Laurens Vanthoor	1:15.842	+7.385	16
18	GTLM	66	(United States) Ford Chip Ganassi Racing	(United States) Joey Hand	1:15.856	+7.399	17
19	GTLM	67	(United States) Ford Chip Ganassi Racing	(United Kingdom) Richard Westbrook	1:15.967	+7.510	18
20	GTLM	911	(United States) Porsche GT Team	(United Kingdom) Nick Tandy	1:16.037	+7.580	19
21	GTLM	4	(United States) Corvette Racing	(United Kingdom) Oliver Gavin	1:16.048	+7.591	20
22	GTLM	25	(United States) BMW Team RLL	(United States) Colton Herta	1:16.327	+8.870	21
23	**GTD**	**48**	**(United States) Paul Miller Racing**	**(United States) Corey Lewis**	**1:19.530**	**+11.073**	23‡
24	GTD	33	(United States) Mercedes-AMG Team Riley Motorsports	(United States) Ben Keating	1:19.665	+11.208	24
25	GTD	63	(United States) Scuderia Corsa	(United States) Jeff Westphal	1:19.721	+11.264	25
26	GTD	86	(United States) Meyer Shank Racing with Curb-Agajanian	(United States) Justin Marks	1:19.820	+11.363	26
27	GTD	57	(United States) Heinricher Racing w/Meyer Shank Racing	(Denmark) Christina Nielsen	1:19.952	+11.495	27
28	GTD	9	(Canada) Pfaff Motorsports	(Canada) Zacharie Robichon	1:20.200	+11.743	28
29	GTD	14	(Canada) AIM Vasser Sullivan	(United States) Richard Heistand	1:20.260	+11.803	29
30	GTD	12	(Canada) AIM Vasser Sullivan	(United States) Frankie Montecalvo	1:20.323	+11.866	30
31	GTD	44	(United States) Magnus Racing	(United States) John Potter	1:21.234	+12.777	31
32	GTD	29	(Germany) Montaplast by Land-Motorsport	(Germany) Christopher Mies	No time^{1}	_	33
33	GTD	47	(United States) Precision Performance Motorsports	(United States) Shinya Michimi	No time^{2}	_	34
34	GTD	96	(United States) Turner Motorsport	(United States) Robby Foley	No time	_	32
Sources:

- ^{1} The No. 3 Corvette Racing entry was moved to the back of the GTLM classification for violating competition rules regarding the car's rear wing.
- ^{2} The No. 29 Montaplast by Land-Motorsport entry had all qualifying laps forfeited as per Article 40.2.9. of the Sporting regulations (car was touched by the crew during qualifying without permission by the officials).
- ^{3} The No. 47 Precision Performance Motorsports entry had all qualifying laps forfeited as per Article 40.2.9. of the Sporting regulations (car was touched by the crew during qualifying without permission by the officials).

== Race ==
=== Post-race ===
Cameron and Montoya took the DPi Drivers' Championship with 302 points. They were five points clear of Derani and Nasr. With 270 points, McMurry won the LMP2 Drivers' Championship, 11 points clear of Cassels. Bamber and Vanthoor took the GTLM Drivers' Championship with 330 points. They were 17 points clear of Pilet and Tandy in second. García and Magnussen were third with 317 points. Farnbacher and Hindman won the GTD Drivers' Championship with 283 points, 21 points ahead of Auberlen and Foley. Robichon was third with 262 points. Acura, Porsche, and Lamborghini won their respective Manufactures' Championships, while Acura Team Penske, PR1/Mathiasen Motorsports, Porsche GT Team, and Meyer Shank Racing won their respective Teams' Championships.

=== Race results ===
Class winners are denoted in bold and ‡.

Pos	Class	No	Team	Drivers	Chassis	Laps	Time/Retired
Pos	Class	No	Team	Drivers	Engine	Laps	Time/Retired
1	**DPi**	**31**	**(United States) Whelen Engineering Racing**	**(Brazil) Felipe Nasr (Brazil) Pipo Derani (United States) Eric Curran**	**Cadillac DPi-V.R**	**465**	**10:00:40.809‡**
1	**DPi**	**31**	**(United States) Whelen Engineering Racing**	**(Brazil) Felipe Nasr (Brazil) Pipo Derani (United States) Eric Curran**	**Cadillac 5.5 L V8**	**465**	**10:00:40.809‡**
2	DPi	10	(United States) Konica Minolta Cadillac	(United States) Jordan Taylor (France) Matthieu Vaxivière (Netherlands) Renger van der Zande	Cadillac DPi-V.R	465	+0.996
2	DPi	10	(United States) Konica Minolta Cadillac	(United States) Jordan Taylor (France) Matthieu Vaxivière (Netherlands) Renger van der Zande	Cadillac 5.5 L V8	465	+0.996
3	DPi	7	(United States) Acura Team Penske	(United States) Ricky Taylor (Brazil) Hélio Castroneves (United States) Graham Rahal	Acura ARX-05	465	+9.842
3	DPi	7	(United States) Acura Team Penske	(United States) Ricky Taylor (Brazil) Hélio Castroneves (United States) Graham Rahal	Acura AR35TT 3.5 L Turbo V6	465	+9.842
4	DPi	6	(United States) Acura Team Penske	(United States) Dane Cameron (Colombia) Juan Pablo Montoya (France) Simon Pagenaud	Acura ARX-05	464	+1 Lap
4	DPi	6	(United States) Acura Team Penske	(United States) Dane Cameron (Colombia) Juan Pablo Montoya (France) Simon Pagenaud	Acura AR35TT 3.5 L Turbo V6	464	+1 Lap
5	DPi	84	(United States) JDC-Miller MotorSports	(Switzerland) Simon Trummer (South Africa) Stephen Simpson (United States) Chris Miller	Cadillac DPi-V.R	464	+1 Lap
5	DPi	84	(United States) JDC-Miller MotorSports	(Switzerland) Simon Trummer (South Africa) Stephen Simpson (United States) Chris Miller	Cadillac 5.5 L V8	464	+1 Lap
6	DPi	77	(Germany) Mazda Team Joest	(Germany) Timo Bernhard (United Kingdom) Oliver Jarvis (United States) Tristan Nunez	Mazda RT24-P	463	+2 Laps
6	DPi	77	(Germany) Mazda Team Joest	(Germany) Timo Bernhard (United Kingdom) Oliver Jarvis (United States) Tristan Nunez	Mazda MZ-2.0T 2.0 L Turbo I4	463	+2 Laps
7	DPi	5	(United States) Mustang Sampling Racing	(Portugal) João Barbosa (Portugal) Filipe Albuquerque (United Kingdom) Mike Conway	Cadillac DPi-V.R	459	+6 Laps
7	DPi	5	(United States) Mustang Sampling Racing	(Portugal) João Barbosa (Portugal) Filipe Albuquerque (United Kingdom) Mike Conway	Cadillac 5.5 L V8	459	+6 Laps
8	DPi	54	(United States) CORE Autosport	(United States) Colin Braun (France) Romain Dumas (United States) Jon Bennett	Nissan Onroak DPi	457	+8 Laps
8	DPi	54	(United States) CORE Autosport	(United States) Colin Braun (France) Romain Dumas (United States) Jon Bennett	Nissan VR38DETT 3.8 L Turbo V6	457	+8 Laps
9	DPi	85	(United States) JDC-Miller MotorSports	(France) Tristan Vautier (Colombia) Juan Piedrahita (Canada) Misha Goikhberg	Cadillac DPi-V.R	446	+19 Laps
9	DPi	85	(United States) JDC-Miller MotorSports	(France) Tristan Vautier (Colombia) Juan Piedrahita (Canada) Misha Goikhberg	Cadillac 5.5 L V8	446	+19 Laps
10	**GTLM**	**62**	**(United States) Risi Competizione**	**(United Kingdom) James Calado (Italy) Alessandro Pier Guidi (Brazil) Daniel Serra**	**Ferrari 488 GTE**	**434**	**+31 Laps‡**
10	**GTLM**	**62**	**(United States) Risi Competizione**	**(United Kingdom) James Calado (Italy) Alessandro Pier Guidi (Brazil) Daniel Serra**	**Ferrari F154CB 3.9 L Turbo V8**	**434**	**+31 Laps‡**
11	GTLM	67	(United States) Ford Chip Ganassi Racing	(Australia) Ryan Briscoe (United Kingdom) Richard Westbrook (New Zealand) Scott Dixon	Ford GT	434	+31 Laps
11	GTLM	67	(United States) Ford Chip Ganassi Racing	(Australia) Ryan Briscoe (United Kingdom) Richard Westbrook (New Zealand) Scott Dixon	Ford EcoBoost 3.5 L Turbo V6	434	+31 Laps
12	GTLM	25	(United States) BMW Team RLL	(United Kingdom) Tom Blomqvist (United States) Connor De Phillippi (United States) Colton Herta	BMW M8 GTE	433	+32 Laps
12	GTLM	25	(United States) BMW Team RLL	(United Kingdom) Tom Blomqvist (United States) Connor De Phillippi (United States) Colton Herta	BMW S63 4.0 L Twin-turbo V8	433	+32 Laps
13	GTLM	3	(United States) Corvette Racing	(Spain) Antonio García (Denmark) Jan Magnussen (Germany) Mike Rockenfeller	Chevrolet Corvette C7.R	433	+32 Laps
13	GTLM	3	(United States) Corvette Racing	(Spain) Antonio García (Denmark) Jan Magnussen (Germany) Mike Rockenfeller	Chevrolet LT5.5 5.5 L V8	433	+32 Laps
14	GTLM	912	(United States) Porsche GT Team	(New Zealand) Earl Bamber (Belgium) Laurens Vanthoor (France) Mathieu Jaminet	Porsche 911 RSR	433	+32 Laps
14	GTLM	912	(United States) Porsche GT Team	(New Zealand) Earl Bamber (Belgium) Laurens Vanthoor (France) Mathieu Jaminet	Porsche 4.0 L Flat-6	433	+32 Laps
15	GTLM	911	(United States) Porsche GT Team	(United Kingdom) Nick Tandy (France) Frédéric Makowiecki (France) Patrick Pilet	Porsche 911 RSR	432	+33 Laps
15	GTLM	911	(United States) Porsche GT Team	(United Kingdom) Nick Tandy (France) Frédéric Makowiecki (France) Patrick Pilet	Porsche 4.0 L Flat-6	432	+33 Laps
16	GTLM	4	(United States) Corvette Racing	(United Kingdom) Oliver Gavin (United States) Tommy Milner (Switzerland) Marcel Fässler	Chevrolet Corvette C7.R	431	+34 Laps
16	GTLM	4	(United States) Corvette Racing	(United Kingdom) Oliver Gavin (United States) Tommy Milner (Switzerland) Marcel Fässler	Chevrolet LT5.5 5.5 L V8	431	+34 Laps
17	GTLM	66	(United States) Ford Chip Ganassi Racing	(United States) Joey Hand (Germany) Dirk Müller (France) Sébastien Bourdais	Ford GT	430	+35 Laps
17	GTLM	66	(United States) Ford Chip Ganassi Racing	(United States) Joey Hand (Germany) Dirk Müller (France) Sébastien Bourdais	Ford EcoBoost 3.5 L Turbo V6	430	+35 Laps
18	**GTD**	**96**	**(United States) Turner Motorsport**	**(United States) Bill Auberlen (United States) Robby Foley (United States) Dillon Machavern**	**BMW M6 GT3**	**418**	**+47 Laps‡**
18	**GTD**	**96**	**(United States) Turner Motorsport**	**(United States) Bill Auberlen (United States) Robby Foley (United States) Dillon Machavern**	**BMW 4.4 L Turbo V8**	**418**	**+47 Laps‡**
19	GTD	29	(Germany) Montaplast by Land-Motorsport	(Switzerland) Ricardo Feller (Germany) Christopher Mies (Canada) Daniel Morad	Audi R8 LMS Evo	418	+47 Laps
19	GTD	29	(Germany) Montaplast by Land-Motorsport	(Switzerland) Ricardo Feller (Germany) Christopher Mies (Canada) Daniel Morad	Audi 5.2 L V10	418	+47 Laps
20	GTD	9	(Canada) Pfaff Motorsports	(Canada) Scott Hargrove (Canada) Zacharie Robichon (Germany) Lars Kern	Porsche 911 GT3 R	418	+47 Laps
20	GTD	9	(Canada) Pfaff Motorsports	(Canada) Scott Hargrove (Canada) Zacharie Robichon (Germany) Lars Kern	Porsche 4.0 L Flat-6	418	+47 Laps
21 DNF	GTD	33	(United States) Mercedes-AMG Team Riley Motorsports	(United States) Ben Keating (Netherlands) Jeroen Bleekemolen (Brazil) Felipe Fraga	Mercedes-AMG GT3	417	Out of Fuel
21 DNF	GTD	33	(United States) Mercedes-AMG Team Riley Motorsports	(United States) Ben Keating (Netherlands) Jeroen Bleekemolen (Brazil) Felipe Fraga	Mercedes-AMG M159 6.2 L V8	417	Out of Fuel
22	DPi	50	(Argentina) Juncos Racing	(United States) Will Owen (Austria) René Binder (United States) Spencer Pigot	Cadillac DPi-V.R	417	+48 Laps
22	DPi	50	(Argentina) Juncos Racing	(United States) Will Owen (Austria) René Binder (United States) Spencer Pigot	Cadillac 5.5 L V8	417	+48 Laps
23	GTD	63	(United States) Scuderia Corsa	(United States) Cooper MacNeil (Finland) Toni Vilander (United States) Jeff Westphal	Ferrari 488 GT3	417	+48 Laps
23	GTD	63	(United States) Scuderia Corsa	(United States) Cooper MacNeil (Finland) Toni Vilander (United States) Jeff Westphal	Ferrari F154 3.9 L Turbo V8	417	+48 Laps
24	GTD	48	(United States) Paul Miller Racing	(United States) Bryan Sellers (United States) Corey Lewis (Germany) Marco Seefried	Lamborghini Huracán GT3 Evo	417	+48 Laps
24	GTD	48	(United States) Paul Miller Racing	(United States) Bryan Sellers (United States) Corey Lewis (Germany) Marco Seefried	Lamborghini 5.2 L V10	417	+48 Laps
25	GTD	57	(United States) Heinricher Racing w/Meyer Shank Racing	(United Kingdom) Katherine Legge (Brazil) Bia Figueiredo (Denmark) Christina Nielsen	Acura NSX GT3 Evo	417	+48 Laps
25	GTD	57	(United States) Heinricher Racing w/Meyer Shank Racing	(United Kingdom) Katherine Legge (Brazil) Bia Figueiredo (Denmark) Christina Nielsen	Acura 3.5 L Turbo V6	417	+48 Laps
26	GTLM	24	(United States) BMW Team RLL	(Finland) Jesse Krohn (United States) John Edwards (Austria) Philipp Eng	BMW M8 GTE	412	+53 Laps
26	GTLM	24	(United States) BMW Team RLL	(Finland) Jesse Krohn (United States) John Edwards (Austria) Philipp Eng	BMW S63 4.0 L Twin-turbo V8	412	+53 Laps
27	GTD	44	(United States) Magnus Racing	(United States) John Potter (United States) Andy Lally (United States) Spencer Pumpelly	Lamborghini Huracán GT3 Evo	401	+64 Laps
27	GTD	44	(United States) Magnus Racing	(United States) John Potter (United States) Andy Lally (United States) Spencer Pumpelly	Lamborghini 5.2 L V10	401	+64 Laps
28	GTD	14	(Canada) AIM Vasser Sullivan	(United States) Richard Heistand (United Kingdom) Jack Hawksworth (United States) Parker Chase	Lexus RC F GT3	329	+136 Laps
28	GTD	14	(Canada) AIM Vasser Sullivan	(United States) Richard Heistand (United Kingdom) Jack Hawksworth (United States) Parker Chase	Lexus 5.0 L V8	329	+136 Laps
29 DNF	GTD	47	(United States) Precision Performance Motorsports	(United States) Brandon Gdovic (United States) Don Yount (United States) Shinya Michimi	Lamborghini Huracán GT3 Evo	317	Did not finish
29 DNF	GTD	47	(United States) Precision Performance Motorsports	(United States) Brandon Gdovic (United States) Don Yount (United States) Shinya Michimi	Lamborghini 5.2 L V10	317	Did not finish
30	GTD	12	(Canada) AIM Vasser Sullivan	(United States) Frankie Montecalvo (United States) Townsend Bell (United States) Aaron Telitz	Lexus RC F GT3	219	+246 Laps
30	GTD	12	(Canada) AIM Vasser Sullivan	(United States) Frankie Montecalvo (United States) Townsend Bell (United States) Aaron Telitz	Lexus 5.0 L V8	219	+246 Laps
31 DNF	GTD	86	(United States) Meyer Shank Racing w/Curb-Agajanian	(Germany) Mario Farnbacher (United States) Trent Hindman (United States) Justin Marks	Acura NSX GT3 Evo	201	Engine
31 DNF	GTD	86	(United States) Meyer Shank Racing w/Curb-Agajanian	(Germany) Mario Farnbacher (United States) Trent Hindman (United States) Justin Marks	Acura 3.5 L Turbo V6	201	Engine
32 DNF	**LMP2**	**52**	**(United States) PR1/Mathiasen Motorsports**	**(United States) Matt McMurry (France) Gabriel Aubry (Canada) Dalton Kellett**	**Oreca 07**	**201**	**Mechanical‡**
32 DNF	**LMP2**	**52**	**(United States) PR1/Mathiasen Motorsports**	**(United States) Matt McMurry (France) Gabriel Aubry (Canada) Dalton Kellett**	**Gibson GK428 4.2 L V8**	**201**	**Mechanical‡**
33 DNF	DPi	55	(Germany) Mazda Team Joest	(United States) Jonathan Bomarito (United Kingdom) Harry Tincknell (France) Olivier Pla	Mazda RT24-P	196	Misfire
33 DNF	DPi	55	(Germany) Mazda Team Joest	(United States) Jonathan Bomarito (United Kingdom) Harry Tincknell (France) Olivier Pla	Mazda MZ-2.0T 2.0 L Turbo I4	196	Misfire
34 DNF	LMP2	38	(United States) Performance Tech Motorsports	(Canada) Cameron Cassels (United States) Kyle Masson (United States) Andrew Evans	Oreca 07	65	Crash
34 DNF	LMP2	38	(United States) Performance Tech Motorsports	(Canada) Cameron Cassels (United States) Kyle Masson (United States) Andrew Evans	Gibson GK428 4.2 L V8	65	Crash

== Standings after the race ==
DPi Drivers' Championship standings
Pos.	+/–	Driver	Points
1		(United States) Dane Cameron (Colombia) Juan Pablo Montoya	302
2		(Brazil) Pipo Derani (Brazil) Felipe Nasr	297
3		(Brazil) Hélio Castroneves (United States) Ricky Taylor	284
4	2	(United States) Jordan Taylor (Netherlands) Renger van der Zande	274
5		(United Kingdom) Oliver Jarvis (United States) Tristan Nunez	268

LMP2 Drivers' Championship standings
Pos.	+/–	Driver	Points
1		(United States) Matt McMurry	270
2		(Canada) Cameron Cassels	259
3		(United States) Kyle Masson	227
4		(France) Gabriel Aubry	130
5		(Canada) Dalton Kellett	105

GTLM Drivers' Championship standings
Pos.	+/–	Driver	Points
1		(New Zealand) Earl Bamber (Belgium) Laurens Vanthoor	330
2		(France) Patrick Pilet (United Kingdom) Nick Tandy	317
3		(Spain) Antonio García (Denmark) Jan Magnussen	317
4	1	(Australia) Ryan Briscoe (United Kingdom) Richard Westbrook	313
5	1	(Germany) Dirk Müller	306

GTD Drivers' Championship standings
Pos.	+/–	Driver	Points
1		(Germany) Mario Farnbacher (United States) Trent Hindman	283
2	1	(United States) Bill Auberlen (United States) Robby Foley	262
3	1	(Canada) Zacharie Robichon	262
4		(United States) Andy Lally (United States) John Potter	249
5		(Finland) Toni Vilander (United States) Cooper MacNeil	246

- Note: Only the top five positions are included for all sets of standings.

DPi Teams' Championship standings
Pos.	+/–	Team	Points
1		(United States) #6 Acura Team Penske	302
2		(United States) #31 Whelen Engineering Racing	297
3		(United States) #7 Acura Team Penske	284
4	2	(United States) #10 Konica Minolta Cadillac	274
5		(Germany) #77 Mazda Team Joest	268

LMP2 Teams' Championship standings
Pos.	+/–	Team	Points
1		(United States) #52 PR1/Mathiasen Motorsports	270
2		(United States) #38 Performance Tech Motorsports	259
3		(United States) #18 DragonSpeed	35
4		(United States) #81 DragonSpeed	30

GTLM Teams' Championship standings
Pos.	+/–	Team	Points
1		(United States) #912 Porsche GT Team	330
2		(United States) #911 Porsche GT Team	317
3		(United States) #3 Corvette Racing	317
4	1	(United States) #67 Ford Chip Ganassi Racing	313
5	1	(United States) #66 Ford Chip Ganassi Racing	306

GTD Teams' Championship standings
Pos.	+/–	Team	Points
1		(United States) #86 Meyer-Shank Racing with Curb Agajanian	283
2	1	(United States) #96 Turner Motorsport	262
3	1	(Canada) #9 Pfaff Motorsports	262
4		(United States) #44 Magnus Racing	249
5		(United States) #63 Scuderia Corsa	237

- Note: Only the top five positions are included for all sets of standings.

DPi Manufacturers' Championship standings
Pos.	+/–	Manufacturer	Points
1		(Japan) Acura	329
2		(United States) Cadillac	324
3		(Japan) Mazda	311
4		(Japan) Nissan	286

GTLM Manufacturers' Championship standings
Pos.	+/–	Manufacturer	Points
1		(Germany) Porsche	358
2		(United States) Ford	345
3		(United States) Chevrolet	330
4		(Germany) BMW	327
5		(Italy) Ferrari	67

GTD Manufacturers' Championship standings
Pos.	+/–	Manufacturer	Points
1		(Italy) Lamborghini	294
2		(Japan) Acura	292
3		(Germany) Porsche	291
4	2	(Germany) BMW	278
5	1	(Japan) Lexus	277

- Note: Only the top five positions are included for all sets of standings.
- Note: Bold names include the Drivers', Teams', and Manufactures' Champion respectively.

IMSA SportsCar Championship
Previous race: Monterey Grand Prix	2019 season	Next race: none
