= 2016 Toyota Racing Series =

Motor racing competition

The 2016 Toyota Racing Series was the twelfth running of the Toyota Racing Series, the premier open-wheel motorsport category held in New Zealand. The series, which consisted of fifteen races at five meetings, began on 16 January at Ruapuna Park in Christchurch, and ended on 14 February with the 61st running of the New Zealand Grand Prix, at Manfeild Autocourse in Feilding.

As the first European driver to win the Toyota Racing Series, M2 Competition's Lando Norris wrapped up the championship with a race to spare, amassing six wins, eight poles, five fastest laps, and three round wins on his way to the title. Norris won a race at every meeting, taking a pair of victories in Taupō, while only finishing off the podium four times.

Force India protégé Jehan Daruvala took the runner-up spot in the championship, with one pole and three wins. Daruvala struggled in Ruapuna, but a strategic tyre gamble in a soggy Race 3 paid off, enabling him to take the Lady Wigram Trophy, despite starting 15th. Two further wins followed in Teretonga and Taupō, and solid top-8 finishes in each of the last nine races helped the Indian to second place overall.

New Zealand's Brendon Leitch finished the season in third, despite only one win and three podiums. However, it was his consistency that gave him such a good championship position, as he finished every race in the top 10. Leitch's 754-point haul is also the most points accrued by a Victory Motor Racing driver in team history.

Of the other drivers, Ferdinand Habsburg was top Giles Motorsport driver, after a strong campaign saw him take two wins. Pedro Piquet also took victory on two occasions, first in the second race at Teretonga, and again at Hampton Downs, where a superb run from pole saw him take the NZ Motor Cup. Piquet was often runaway leader Norris's main challenger, both on track and in the standings. Ferrari Driver Academy member Guanyu Zhou scored a breakthrough win in Hampton Downs and finished strongly throughout the duration of the series, although a disastrous final weekend compromised his attack. Rookie Taylor Cockerton was the best-placed ETEC Motorsport driver, finishing in ninth.

== Teams and drivers ==
All teams were New Zealand-registered.

Team	No.	Driver	Status	Rounds
ETEC Motorsport	4	(United States) Theo Bean	R	All
ETEC Motorsport	11	(New Zealand) Taylor Cockerton	R	All
ETEC Motorsport	13	(Brazil) Rodrigo Baptista	R	All
ETEC Motorsport	26	(France) Timothé Buret	R	All
M2 Competition	5	(Brazil) Pedro Piquet		All
M2 Competition	6	(India) Jehan Daruvala	R	All
M2 Competition	10	(Russia) Artem Markelov		All
M2 Competition	15	(Canada) Kami Moreira-Laliberté	R	All
M2 Competition	31	(United Kingdom) Lando Norris	R	All
M2 Competition	33	(China) Guanyu Zhou	R	All
Giles Motorsport	17	(Canada) Devlin DeFrancesco	R	All
Giles Motorsport	21	(Argentina) Nicolas Dapero	R	All
Giles Motorsport	23	(United States) Will Owen	R	All
Giles Motorsport	40	(New Zealand) James Munro		All
Giles Motorsport	62	(Austria) Ferdinand Habsburg		All
Giles Motorsport	67	(Poland) Antoni Ptak Jr.	R	All
Victory Motor Racing	18	(Germany) Julian Hanses	R	All
Victory Motor Racing	25	(Brazil) Bruno Baptista	R	All
Victory Motor Racing	49	(Australia) Thomas Randle		5
Victory Motor Racing	86	(New Zealand) Brendon Leitch		All

== Race calendar and results ==
The calendar for the series was announced on 23 June 2015, and will be held over five successive weekends in January and February. As opposed to the previous year, all rounds will be triple-headers.

Round		Date	Circuit	Pole position	Fastest lap	Winning driver	Winning team	Round winner(s)	Report
1	R1	16 January	Ruapuna Park, Christchurch	(United Kingdom) Lando Norris	(United Kingdom) Lando Norris	(Austria) Ferdinand Habsburg	Giles Motorsport	(Austria) Ferdinand Habsburg	Report
1	R2	17 January	Ruapuna Park, Christchurch		(United Kingdom) Lando Norris	(United Kingdom) Lando Norris	M2 Competition	(Austria) Ferdinand Habsburg	Report
1	R3	17 January	Ruapuna Park, Christchurch	(United Kingdom) Lando Norris	(Brazil) Pedro Piquet	(India) Jehan Daruvala	M2 Competition	(Austria) Ferdinand Habsburg	Report
2	R1	23 January	Teretonga Park, Invercargill	(United Kingdom) Lando Norris	(India) Jehan Daruvala	(India) Jehan Daruvala	M2 Competition	(United Kingdom) Lando Norris	Report
2	R2	24 January	Teretonga Park, Invercargill		(United Kingdom) Lando Norris	(Brazil) Pedro Piquet	M2 Competition	(United Kingdom) Lando Norris	Report
2	R3	24 January	Teretonga Park, Invercargill	(United Kingdom) Lando Norris	(United Kingdom) Lando Norris	(United Kingdom) Lando Norris	M2 Competition	(United Kingdom) Lando Norris	Report
3	R1	30 January	Hampton Downs Motorsport Park, Waikato	(United Kingdom) Lando Norris	(India) Jehan Daruvala	(United Kingdom) Lando Norris	M2 Competition	(Brazil) Pedro Piquet	Report
3	R2	31 January	Hampton Downs Motorsport Park, Waikato		(China) Guanyu Zhou	(China) Guanyu Zhou	M2 Competition	(Brazil) Pedro Piquet	Report
3	R3	31 January	Hampton Downs Motorsport Park, Waikato	(Brazil) Pedro Piquet	(Austria) Ferdinand Habsburg	(Brazil) Pedro Piquet	M2 Competition	(Brazil) Pedro Piquet	Report
4	R1	6 February	Bruce McLaren Motorsport Park, Taupō	(United Kingdom) Lando Norris	(Brazil) Pedro Piquet	(United Kingdom) Lando Norris	M2 Competition	(United Kingdom) Lando Norris	Report
4	R2	7 February	Bruce McLaren Motorsport Park, Taupō		(India) Jehan Daruvala	(India) Jehan Daruvala	M2 Competition	(United Kingdom) Lando Norris	Report
4	R3	7 February	Bruce McLaren Motorsport Park, Taupō	(United Kingdom) Lando Norris	(United Kingdom) Lando Norris	(United Kingdom) Lando Norris	M2 Competition	(United Kingdom) Lando Norris	Report
5	R1	13 February	Manfeild Autocourse, Feilding	(India) Jehan Daruvala	(New Zealand) James Munro	(Austria) Ferdinand Habsburg	Giles Motorsport	(United Kingdom) Lando Norris	Report
5	R2	14 February	Manfeild Autocourse, Feilding		(Brazil) Pedro Piquet	(New Zealand) Brendon Leitch	Victory Motor Racing	(United Kingdom) Lando Norris	Report
5	R3	14 February	Manfeild Autocourse, Feilding	(United Kingdom) Lando Norris	(Austria) Ferdinand Habsburg	(United Kingdom) Lando Norris	M2 Competition	(United Kingdom) Lando Norris	Report

== Championship standings ==
In order for a driver to score championship points, they have to complete at least 75% of the race winner's distance, and be running at the race's completion. All races counted towards the final championship standings.

Scoring system

Position	1st	2nd	3rd	4th	5th	6th	7th	8th	9th	10th	11th	12th	13th	14th	15th	16th	17th	18th	19th	20th
Points	75	67	60	54	49	45	42	39	36	33	30	28	26	24	22	20	18	16	14	12

=== Drivers' championship ===
Pos.	Driver	RUA			TER			HMP			TAU			MAN			Points
1	(United Kingdom) Lando Norris	**3**	1	**9**	**2**	2	**1**	**1**	17	6	**1**	2	**1**	3	4	**1**	924
2	(India) Jehan Daruvala	8	13	1	1	5	17	2	4	3	5	1	8	**4**	2	7	789
3	(New Zealand) Brendon Leitch	6	9	5	5	4	2	5	2	9	7	4	5	5	1	10	754
4	(Austria) Ferdinand Habsburg	1	7	2	13	8	4	6	9	8	6	12	4	1	7	3	727
5	(Brazil) Pedro Piquet	7	2	Ret	4	1	10	3	3	**1**	2	5	2	Ret	8	15	710
6	(China) Guanyu Zhou	5	3	4	7	6	8	7	1	4	4	3	3	Ret	10	17	685
7	(New Zealand) James Munro	4	Ret	14	15	10	9	4	11	2	3	6	11	2	6	4	621
8	(Russia) Artem Markelov	2	4	3	6	3	3	12	Ret	5	12	7	Ret	Ret	12	2	588
9	(New Zealand) Taylor Cockerton	9	11	11	11	12	11	10	8	10	9	9	6	6	5	6	545
10	(Canada) Devlin DeFrancesco	14	10	6	Ret	14	5	11	13	12	8	11	10	7	9	13	465
11	(Brazil) Bruno Baptista	Ret	8	8	Ret	13	6	9	7	Ret	10	8	7	9	11	9	443
12	(Poland) Antoni Ptak Jr.	13	5	12	3	Ret	15	8	5	11	Ret	Ret	14	8	3	Ret	426
13	(Canada) Kami Moreira-Laliberté	Ret	14	7	Ret	16	7	17	6	7	11	Ret	9	14	14	8	386
14	(United States) Will Owen	11	12	Ret	10	9	13	16	10	Ret	13	10	12	15	17	14	357
15	(France) Timothé Buret	10	6	15	14	11	Ret	13	15	13	16	Ret	13	10	13	18	349
16	(Brazil) Rodrigo Baptista	Ret	16	13	9	18	16	15	14	14	17	Ret	Ret	11	16	11	286
17	(Argentina) Nicolas Dapero	12	DSQ	10	8	7	18	19	Ret	Ret	14	Ret	Ret	Ret	15	16	238
18	(United States) Theo Bean	16	17	Ret	12	17	14	18	12	Ret	15	13	15	Ret	18	Ret	238
19	(Germany) Julian Hanses	15	15	Ret	Ret	15	12	14	16	Ret	Ret	Ret	16	13	19	12	226
20	(Australia) Thomas Randle													12	20	5	89
Pos.	Driver	RUA			TER			HMP			TAU			MAN			Points

Colour	Result
Gold	Winner
Silver	Second place
Bronze	Third place
Green	Points classification
Blue	Non-points classification
Blue	Non-classified finish (NC)
Purple	Retired, not classified (Ret)
Red	Did not qualify (DNQ)
Red	Did not pre-qualify (DNPQ)
Black	Disqualified (DSQ)
White	Did not start (DNS)
White	Withdrew (WD)
White	Race cancelled (C)
Blank	Did not practice (DNP)
Blank	Did not arrive (DNA)
Blank	Excluded (EX)

**Bold** – Pole
Italics – Fastest Lap

Rookie
