= Aaron Telitz =

American racing driver

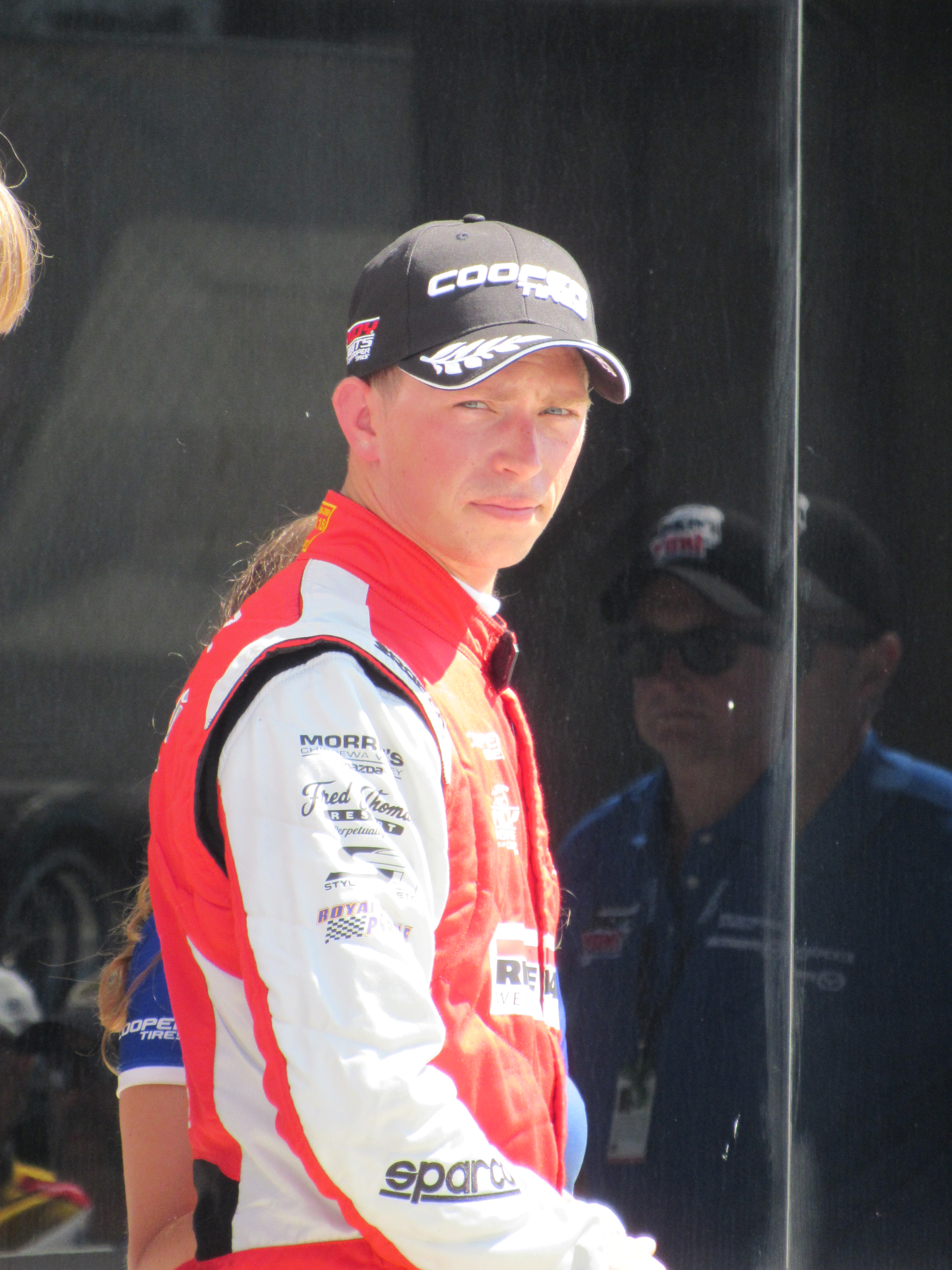
- Telitz at Road America in 2018
- Nationality: (United States) American
- Born: December 13, 1991 (age 34) Birchwood, Wisconsin, U.S.

Indy Lights career
- Debut season: 2017
- Current team: Belardi Auto Racing
- Categorisation: FIA Silver (until 2021); FIA Gold (2022–)
- Car number: 4
- Starts: 39
- Wins: 3
- Poles: 3
- Fastest laps: 4

Previous series
- 2014–2015 2016: U.S. F2000 National Championship; Pro Mazda Championship

Awards
- 2014: Team USA Scholarship

Aaron Telitz (born December 13, 1991) is an American race car driver. He currently competes full-time in the WeatherTech SportsCar Championship, driving for Vasser Sullivan Racing.

== Career ==
Born in Birchwood, Wisconsin, Telitz began his racing career in karting in 1998. He remained in karting until 2012. In 2014, Telitz moved into open-wheel racing, competing in the U.S. F2000 National Championship with ArmsUp Motorsports. He claimed a win and six podiums in fourteen races, ending fourth in the season standings. Telitz returned to the series in 2015, moving to Cape Motorsports with Wayne Taylor Racing. He got a win and eleven podiums in sixteen races, finishing third in the final classification.

In 2016, Telitz moved up the Road to Indy ladder, graduating into the Pro Mazda Championship with Team Pelfrey. He collected six wins and six second place finishes in sixteen races, claiming the championship over teammate Patricio O'Ward.

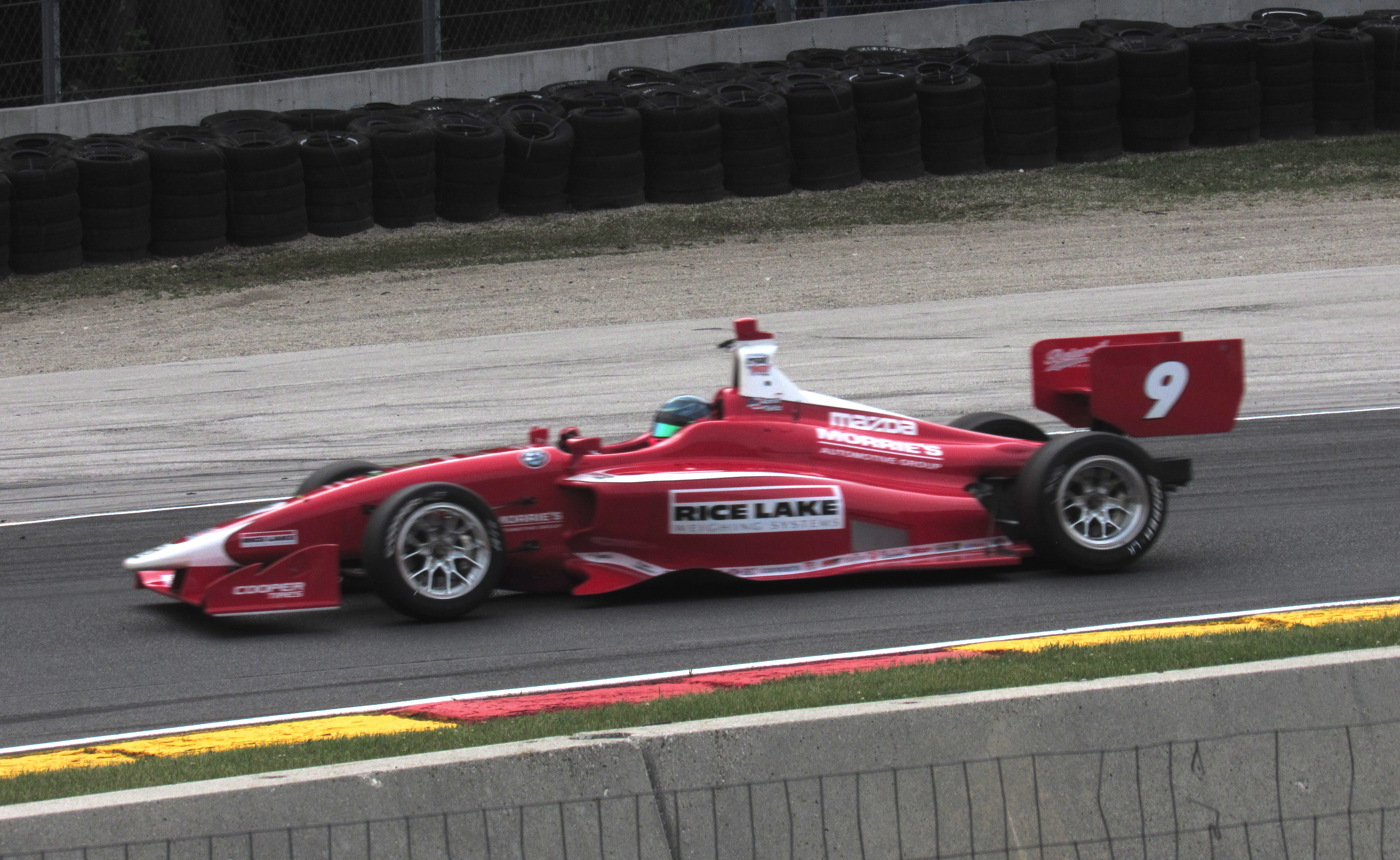
Telitz's 2018 Indy Lights car at Road America

Belardi Auto Racing signed Telitz for the 2017 Indy Lights season, and he scored a second-place finish in the Freedom 100. He stayed with the team for the following year. Also during 2018, Telitz tested an IndyCar for Schmidt Peterson Motorsports.

After not finding enough funding to remain in open-wheel racing for 2019, Telitz was contacted by Jimmy Vasser in late 2018 to compete for his WeatherTech SportsCar Championship team for the four endurance championship events, starting with the 2019 24 Hours of Daytona with co-drivers Townsend Bell, Frankie Montecalvo and Jeff Segal. As part of the deal, Telitz would accompany Vasser's IMSA and IndyCar teams to all other events in hopes of moving to the IndyCar operation. He started off the season with a second place at Daytona.

Telitz still found his way into open-wheel racing during 2019; however, as he signed with Belardi for the Freedom 100, which was derailed with a broken half shaft. A month later, he returned to Belardi for his home event at Road America. His schedule expanded as the season went on, eventually winning a Lights contest in Toronto.

For 2020, Telitz initially re-upped with AVS Vasser Sullivan for four WTSCC endurance events. That schedule was expanded to a full-time ride in June when original full-time driver Parker Chase found that the reconfigured schedule would clash with his educational pursuits.

== Personal life ==
Telitz is a painter and during his 2018 season sold paintings to pay for crash damage. On November 22, 2021, Aaron's wife Maggie gave birth to a son.

== Racing record ==
=== Career summary ===
Season	Series	Team	Races	Wins	Poles	F/Laps	Podiums	Points	Position
2013	F1600 Championship Series	WISKO Race Engineering	12	1	2	1	6	396	3rd
2014	U.S. F2000 National Championship	ArmsUp Motorsports	14	1	0	1	6	246	4th
2015	U.S. F2000 National Championship	Cape Motorsports with Wayne Taylor Racing	16	1	0	3	11	348	3rd
2016	Pro Mazda Championship	Team Pelfrey	16	6	10	4	13	421	1st
2017	Indy Lights	Belardi Auto Racing	16	2	1	1	4	271	6th
2018	Indy Lights	Belardi Auto Racing	16	0	1	1	5	316	6th
2019	Indy Lights	Belardi Auto Racing	7	1	1	2	2	133	9th
2019	IMSA SportsCar Championship - GTD	AIM Vasser Sullivan	4	0	0	0	1	96	25th
2020	IMSA SportsCar Championship - GTD	AIM Vasser Sullivan	11	3	4	0	5	267	3rd
2021	IMSA SportsCar Championship - GTD	Vasser Sullivan Racing	13	1	2	0	3	2640	7th
2022	IMSA SportsCar Championship - GTD Pro	Vasser Sullivan Racing	1	0	0	0	0	265	30th
2022	IMSA SportsCar Championship - GTD	Vasser Sullivan Racing	11	0	2	1	4	2341	10th
2022	Michelin Pilot Challenge - GS	TGR Riley Motorsports	1	0	0	0	0	260	52nd
2022	GT4 America Series - Pro-Am	TGR Smooge Racing							
2023	IMSA SportsCar Championship - GTD	Vasser Sullivan Racing	11	1	0	0	2	2927	3rd
2024	IMSA SportsCar Championship - GTD	Vasser Sullivan	5	0	2	1	1	1135	31st
2024	Michelin Pilot Challenge - GS	Archangel Motorsports	10	1	0	2	3	2220	8th
2024	24H Series - GT3	Optimum Motorsport	1	0	1	0	0	38	21st
2024	Gulf 12 Hours	Optimum Motorsport	1	0	0	0	1	N/A	2nd
2024-25	Asian Le Mans Series - GT	Dragon Racing	3	0	0	0	0	0	NC†
2025	IMSA SportsCar Championship - GTD Pro	Vasser Sullivan Racing	10	0	0	1	0	2577	10th
2025	IMSA SportsCar Championship - GTD	Vasser Sullivan Racing	1	0	0	0	1	325	60th
2025	GT World Challenge America - Pro-Am	Archangel Motorsports	13	0	0	2	0	119	6th
2025	Gulf 12 Hours	Optimum Motorsport	1	0	0	0	0	N/A	4th
2026	IMSA SportsCar Championship - GTD Pro	Vasser Sullivan Racing	1	0	0	0	0	234	40th
2026	IMSA SportsCar Championship - GTD	Vasser Sullivan Racing	10	1	1	0	2	2677	4th
2026	GT World Challenge America - Pro-Am	Archangel Motorsports	7	1	1	1	2	82	3rd

^{†} Telitz was ineligible for points. ^{*} Season still in progress.

=== American open-wheel racing results ===
==== U.S. F2000 National Championship ====
Year	Team	1	2	3	4	5	6	7	8	9	10	11	12	13	14	15	16	Rank	Points
2014	ArmsUp Motorsports	STP; 16	STP; 12	BAR; 5	BAR; 2	IMS; 3	IMS; 11	LOR; 1	TOR; 6	TOR; 3	MOH; 7	MOH; 2	MOH; 7	SNM; 2	SNM; 4			4th	246
2015	Cape Motorsports Wayne Taylor Racing	STP; 2	STP; 2	NOL; 2	NOL; 16	BAR; 1	BAR; 4	IMS; 3	IMS; 2	LOR; 3	TOR; 6	TOR; 5	MOH; 3	MOH; 3	MOH; 2	LAG; 4	LAG; 2	3rd	348

==== Pro Mazda Championship ====
Year	Team	1	2	3	4	5	6	7	8	9	10	11	12	13	14	15	16	Rank	Points
2016	Team Pelfrey	STP; 2	STP; 1	ALA; 2	ALA; 2	IMS; 7	IMS; 2	LOR; 5	RDA; 1	RDA; 1	TOR; 1	TOR; 1	MOH; 2	MOH; 3	LGA; 2	LGA; 5	LGA; 1	1st	421

==== Indy Lights ====
Year	Team	1	2	3	4	5	6	7	8	9	10	11	12	13	14	15	16	17	18	Rank	Points
2017	Belardi Auto Racing	STP; 1	STP; 5	ALA; 13	ALA; 5	IMS; 6	IMS; 13	INDY; 2	RDA; 11	RDA; 5	IOW; 9	TOR; 5	TOR; 2	MOH; 8	MOH; 5	GMP; 15	WGL; 1			6th	271
2018	Belardi Auto Racing	STP; DNS	STP; 9	ALA; 8	ALA; 4	IMS; 3	IMS; 2	INDY; 6	RDA; 5	RDA; 3	IOW; 7	TOR; 4	TOR; 3	MOH; 7	MOH; 7	GTW; 5	POR; 6	POR; 2		6th	316
2019	Belardi Auto Racing	STP	STP	COA	COA	IMS	IMS	INDY; 9	RDA; 3	RDA; 5	TOR; 1	TOR; 6	MOH; 8	MOH; 6	GTW	POR	POR	LAG	LAG	9th	133

=== Complete IMSA SportsCar Championship results ===
Year	Entrant	Class	Chassis	Engine	1	2	3	4	5	6	7	8	9	10	11	12	Rank	Points
2019	AIM Vasser Sullivan	GTD	Lexus RC F GT3	Toyota 2UR-GSE 5.0 L V8	DAY; 2	SEB; 9	MOH	DET	WGL; 9	MOS	LIM	ELK	VIR	LGA	PET; 11		25th	96
2020	AIM Vasser Sullivan	GTD	Lexus RC F GT3	Toyota 2UR-GSE 5.0 L V8	DAY; 12	DAY; 1	SEB; 1†	ELK; 3	VIR; 4	ATL; 5	MOH; 1	CLT; 8	PET; 2	LGA; 11	SEB; 12		3rd	267
2021	Vasser Sullivan Racing	GTD	Lexus RC F GT3	Toyota 2UR-GSE 5.0 L V8	DAY; 16	SEB; 7	MOH; 13	DET; 4†	WGL; 6	WGL; 1†	LIM; 3	ELK; 5	LGA; 6	LBH; 4	VIR; 3	PET; 15	7th	2640
2022	Vasser Sullivan	GTD	Lexus RC F GT3	Toyota 2UR-GSE 5.0 L V8	DAY; 15		LBH; 3†	LGA; 8	MOH; 3	DET; 4	WGL; 16	MOS; 6†	LIM; 8	ELK; 3	VIR; 4	PET; 13	10th	2341
2022	Vasser Sullivan	GTD Pro	Lexus RC F GT3	Toyota 2UR-GSE 5.0 L V8		SEB; 7											30th	265
2023	Vasser Sullivan Racing	GTD	Lexus RC F GT3	Toyota 2UR-GSE 5.0 L V8	DAY; 5	SEB; 5	LBH; 3	LGA; 14	WGL; 1	MOS; 6	LIM; 12	ELK; 5	VIR; 5	IMS; 14	PET; 16		3rd	2927
2024	Vasser Sullivan Racing	GTD	Lexus RC F GT3	Toyota 2UR-GSE 5.0 L V8	DAY; 15	SEB; 13	LBH	LGA	WGL; 4	MOS	ELK	VIR	IMS; 22	PET; 3			31st	1135
2025	Vasser Sullivan Racing	GTD Pro	Lexus RC F GT3	Toyota 2UR-GSE 5.0 L V8	DAY; 11	SEB; 11		LGA; 7	DET; 4	WGL; 8	MOS; 8	ELK; 9	VIR; 8	IMS; 5	PET; 6		10th	2577
2025	Vasser Sullivan Racing	GTD	Lexus RC F GT3	Toyota 2UR-GSE 5.0 L V8			LBH; 3										60th	325
2026	Vasser Sullivan Racing	GTD	Lexus RC F GT3	Toyota 2UR-GSE 5.0 L V8	DAY; 9	SEB; 12	LBH; 1	LGA; 6		WGL; 4	MOS; 2	ELK; 9	VIR; 9	IMS; 8	PET; 11		4th	2677
2026	Vasser Sullivan Racing	GTD Pro	Lexus RC F GT3	Toyota 2UR-GSE 5.0 L V8					DET; 10								40th	234

^{†} Points only counted towards the WeatherTech Sprint Cup and not the overall GTD Championship.

Sporting positions
Preceded by Santiago Urrutia	Pro Mazda Championship; Champion; 2016	Succeeded by Victor Franzoni
Preceded by Zach Robichon	WeatherTech Sprint Cup; Champion; 2020; With: Jack Hawksworth	Succeeded by Ross Gunn; Roman De Angelis
