= 2015 Pro Mazda Championship =

Seasons
- ← 2014 2016 →

The 2015 Pro Mazda Championship was the 17th season in series history. The series consisted of sixteen races at nine tracks, having expanded from fourteen races in 2014; adding races at NOLA Motorsports Park, the Streets of Toronto, Iowa Speedway and Mazda Raceway Laguna Seca, while dropping races at Houston, Milwaukee and Sonoma Raceway. The season began on March 28 at the Grand Prix of St. Petersburg and ended on September 13 at Laguna Seca.

Uruguay's Santiago Urrutia became the first champion from South America since Raphael Matos in 2005, driving for Team Pelfrey. Urrutia, who joined the series for the 2015 season after a year in GP3, won only three races during the season – at NOLA Motorsports Park, the Indianapolis Motor Speedway and Mid-Ohio – but consistent finishing (finishing 14 of 16 races in the top-5) saw him finish 53 points clear of his nearest rival in the championship standings. Second place in the standings went to Cape Motorsports driver Neil Alberico, holding off a late-season challenge from Juncos Racing's Garett Grist for the position, by a tally of eight points. Alberico won four races during the season – which was the most by any driver, shared with Andretti Autosport's Weiron Tan – while Grist won three of the final six races including a weekend sweep at Laguna Seca.

Tan himself finished fourth in the championship, as five finishes outside the top ten as well as a five-point penalty early in the season hampered his championship bid. The championship top five was completed by France's Timothé Buret of Juncos Racing, one point behind Tan, who was a race-winner at Indianapolis. The only other race winner was Florian Latorre, a compatriot of Buret, who won on the Streets of Toronto for Cape Motorsports. He finished eighth in the drivers' championship, due to the result being one of only three podium finishes during the season. In the teams' championship, Juncos Racing won the title mainly due to the results for Grist and Buret, with other team drivers José Gutiérrez and Will Owen. Juncos finished 39 points clear of Team Pelfrey. The expert drivers' championship for older drivers was won by World Speed Motorsports driver Bobby Eberle, taking 11 class wins during 2015.

== Drivers and teams ==
Team	No.	Drivers	Rounds
Andretti Autosport	22	(Malaysia) Weiron Tan	All
Andretti Autosport	28	(Canada) Dalton Kellett	All
Cape Motorsports; Wayne Taylor Racing	2	(Canada) Daniel Burkett	All
Cape Motorsports; Wayne Taylor Racing	3	(United States) Neil Alberico	All
Cape Motorsports; Wayne Taylor Racing	10	(France) Florian Latorre	All
JDC MotorSports	19	(United Kingdom) Raoul Owens	1–5
JDC MotorSports	19	(Canada) Scott Hargrove	6–8
JDC MotorSports	26	(United States) Parker Nicklin	1–8, 15–16
JDC MotorSports	44	(United States) Kevin Davis (E)	6–8
JDC MotorSports	54	(United States) Michael Johnson (Note: Seriously injured in practice at St. Pete.)	1–2, 13–16
JDC MotorSports	91	(United States) Kyle Connery	1–8, 10–11, 13–16
Juncos Racing	5	(Canada) Garett Grist	All
Juncos Racing	6	(France) Timothé Buret	All
Juncos Racing	7	(Mexico) José Gutiérrez	All
Juncos Racing	23	(United States) Will Owen	All
Kaminsky Racing	57	(United States) Bob Kaminsky (E)	6–8, 13–14
M1 Racing	21	(Brazil) Victor Franzoni	6–11, 13–16
M1 Racing	33	(Puerto Rico) Carlos Conde (E)	6–8
M1 Racing	37	(United States) Jay Horak (E)	1–2, 4–8, 10–11, 15–16
M1 Racing	62	(Canada) Bryson Schutte	10–11
Team Pelfrey	80	(United Kingdom) Raoul Owens	6–16
Team Pelfrey	81	(Uruguay) Santiago Urrutia	All
Team Pelfrey	82	(Mexico) Patricio O'Ward	All
World Speed Motorsports	13	(United States) Bobby Eberle (E)	1–11, 13–16
World Speed Motorsports	14	(Italy) Alessandro Latif	All

Icon	Class
(E)	Expert Class

== Race calendar and results ==
Rnd	Circuit	Location	Date	Pole position	Fastest lap	Most laps led	Winning driver	Winning team
1	Streets of St. Petersburg	St. Petersburg, Florida	March 28	(United States) Neil Alberico	(United States) Neil Alberico	(United States) Neil Alberico	(United States) Neil Alberico	Cape Motorsports w/ WTR
2	Streets of St. Petersburg	St. Petersburg, Florida	March 29	(United States) Neil Alberico	(Mexico) José Gutiérrez	(United States) Neil Alberico	(United States) Neil Alberico	Cape Motorsports w/ WTR
3	NOLA Motorsports Park	New Orleans, Louisiana	April 11	(Malaysia) Weiron Tan	(Mexico) Patricio O'Ward	(Uruguay) Santiago Urrutia	(Uruguay) Santiago Urrutia	Team Pelfrey
–	NOLA Motorsports Park	New Orleans, Louisiana	April 12	(Malaysia) Weiron Tan	Race cancelled (Note: Due to adverse weather conditions, the second race at NOLA Motorsports Park was cancelled. The race was rescheduled for the meeting held at the Indianapolis Motor Speedway road course.)			
4	Barber Motorsports Park	Birmingham, Alabama	April 25	(Malaysia) Weiron Tan	(France) Timothé Buret	(Malaysia) Weiron Tan	(Malaysia) Weiron Tan	Andretti Autosport
5	Barber Motorsports Park	Birmingham, Alabama	April 26	(Malaysia) Weiron Tan	(United States) Neil Alberico	(United States) Neil Alberico	(United States) Neil Alberico	Cape Motorsports w/ WTR
6	Indianapolis Motor Speedway road course	Speedway, Indiana	May 7	(Malaysia) Weiron Tan	(France) Timothé Buret	(Malaysia) Weiron Tan	(Malaysia) Weiron Tan	Andretti Autosport
7	Indianapolis Motor Speedway road course	Speedway, Indiana	May 8	(France) Timothé Buret	(Malaysia) Weiron Tan	(France) Timothé Buret	(France) Timothé Buret	Juncos Racing
8	Indianapolis Motor Speedway road course	Speedway, Indiana	May 9	(Uruguay) Santiago Urrutia	(Brazil) Victor Franzoni	(Uruguay) Santiago Urrutia	(Uruguay) Santiago Urrutia	Team Pelfrey
9	Lucas Oil Raceway at Indianapolis	Clermont, Indiana	May 23	(Malaysia) Weiron Tan	(Malaysia) Weiron Tan	(Malaysia) Weiron Tan	(Malaysia) Weiron Tan	Andretti Autosport
10	Streets of Toronto	Toronto, Ontario	June 13	(France) Florian Latorre	(France) Florian Latorre	(France) Florian Latorre	(France) Florian Latorre	Cape Motorsports w/ WTR
11	Streets of Toronto	Toronto, Ontario	June 14	(Canada) Garett Grist	(Canada) Garett Grist	(Canada) Garett Grist	(Canada) Garett Grist	Juncos Racing
12	Iowa Speedway	Newton, Iowa	July 18	(Malaysia) Weiron Tan (Note: Garett Grist set the fastest time in qualifying, but was sent to the back of the grid, alongside teammates José Gutiérrez and Timothé Buret, for unapproved wing adjustments. Weiron Tan, who posted the second-fastest time in qualifying, was therefore recognized as the pole-sitter for the race.)	(Malaysia) Weiron Tan	(Malaysia) Weiron Tan	(Malaysia) Weiron Tan	Andretti Autosport
13	Mid-Ohio Sports Car Course	Lexington, Ohio	August 1	(Canada) Garett Grist	(United States) Neil Alberico	(Uruguay) Santiago Urrutia	(Uruguay) Santiago Urrutia	Team Pelfrey
14	Mid-Ohio Sports Car Course	Lexington, Ohio	August 2	(Canada) Garett Grist	(Canada) Garett Grist	(United States) Neil Alberico	(United States) Neil Alberico	Cape Motorsports w/ WTR
15	Mazda Raceway Laguna Seca	Monterey, California	September 12	(Canada) Garett Grist	(Canada) Garett Grist	(Canada) Garett Grist	(Canada) Garett Grist	Juncos Racing
16	Mazda Raceway Laguna Seca	Monterey, California	September 13	(Uruguay) Santiago Urrutia	(Canada) Garett Grist	(Canada) Garett Grist	(Canada) Garett Grist	Juncos Racing

== Championship standings ==
=== Drivers' championship ===
Pos	Driver	STP (United States)		LOU (United States)		ALA (United States)		IMS (United States)			LOR (United States)	TOR (Canada)		IOW (United States)	MOH (United States)		LAG (United States)		Pts
1	(Uruguay) Santiago Urrutia	2	4	1*	C	3	2	4	3	**1***	15	7	4	5	1*	3	2	**2**	355
2	(United States) Neil Alberico	**1***	**1***	6	C	4	1*	3	17	7	3	14	17	7	2	1*	16	3	302
3	(Canada) Garett Grist	11	6	11	C	7	3	5	6	8	4	5	**1***	11	**4**	**9**	**1***	1*	294
4	(Malaysia) Weiron Tan	16	15	**2**	**C**	**1***	**14**	**1***	4	21	**1***	13	2	**1***	6	7	5	9	282
5	(France) Timothé Buret	17	13	3	C	2	8	2	**1***	3	12	3	7	9	3	2	11	7	281
6	(Mexico) Patricio O'Ward	4	14	4	C	5	7	6	10	5	7	2	3	3	7	6	18	6	250
7	(United States) Will Owen	8	8	13	C	9	4	8	8	2	2	15	8	10	8	5	3	4	243
8	(France) Florian Latorre	3	16	5	C	8	5	21	2	6	8	**1***	14	8	5	17	8	18	222
9	(Mexico) José Gutiérrez	5	2	8	C	16	16	12	7	4	5	16	5	6	12	10	4	8	216
10	(Canada) Dalton Kellett	7	7	7	C	15	6	11	13	11	13	17	DNS	2	9	8	6	5	187
11	(Canada) Daniel Burkett	14	3	9	C	10	10	9	9	10	9	18	9	4	11	12	9	11	176
12	(United Kingdom) Raoul Owens	6	10	12	C	6	11	18	11	12	14	8	6	12	13	13	7	16	166
13	(Italy) Alessandro Latif	9	17	10	C	12	12	13	14	14	10	9	13	13	14	11	12	15	140
14	(United States) Kyle Connery	10	5	14	C	17	9	20	15	13		6	10		18	14	17	10	122
15	(United States) Bobby Eberle	13	12	16	C	14	15	14	18	17	11	11	15		16	16	14	14	101
16	(Brazil) Victor Franzoni							10	5	19	6	4	16		10	4	19	DNS	91
17	(United States) Parker Nicklin	12	11	15	C	11	13	19	16	15							13	12	78
18	(United States) Jay Horak	15	9			13	17	Wth	Wth	Wth		12	12				15	17	58
19	(United States) Michael Johnson	Wth	Wth												15	15	10	13	31
20	(Canada) Scott Hargrove							7	12	9									21
21	(Canada) Bryson Schutte											10	11						21
22	(United States) Bob Kaminsky							15	19	18					17	18			12
23	(United States) Kevin Davis							16	20	16									6
24	(Puerto Rico) Carlos Conde							17	21	20									2
Pos	Driver	STP (United States)		LOU (United States)		ALA (United States)		IMS (United States)			LOR (United States)	TOR (Canada)		IOW (United States)	MOH (United States)		LAG (United States)		Pts

Color	Result
Gold	Winner
Silver	2nd place
Bronze	3rd place
Green	4th & 5th place
Light Blue	6th–10th place
Dark Blue	Finished (Outside Top 10)
Purple	Did not finish
Red	Did not qualify (DNQ)
Brown	Withdrawn (Wth)
Black	Disqualified (DSQ)
White	Did not start (DNS)
Blank	Did not participate (DNP)
Blank	Not competing

**In-line notation**
**Bold**	Pole position (1 point)
Italics	Ran fastest race lap (1 point)
*	Led most race laps (1 point)
^{1}	Qualifying cancelled no bonus point awarded
Rookie

- Ties in points broken by number of wins, or best finishes.
- The first race at the Indianapolis road course was a makeup for the canceled race at NOLA. Drivers who were not at NOLA were ineligible to score points in that race.

=== Teams' championship ===
Pos	Team	Points
1	Juncos Racing	426
2	Team Pelfrey	387
3	Cape Motorsports w/ Wayne Taylor Racing	352
4	Andretti Autosport	257
5	M1 Racing	88
6	JDC MotorSports	84
7	World Speed Motorsports	46
8	Kaminsky Racing	16
