= 2016 Pro Mazda Championship =

Seasons
- ← 2015 2017 →

The 2016 Pro Mazda Championship was the 18th season in series history. The season will begin on March 12 at the Grand Prix of St. Petersburg and end on September 11 at Monterey Grand Prix.

Patricio O'Ward dominated the first half of the season, winning six of the first seven races (and finishing second in the remaining race), vaulting himself into a huge points lead. However, his Team Pelfrey teammate Aaron Telitz vaulted himself back into contention by winning the next four races while O'Ward faltered. Both drivers won one of the three races during the final race weekend but Telitz's non-winning finishes were higher and he won the championship by 28 points. Reigning U.S. F2000 National Championship champion Nico Jamin swept the weekend at the Mid-Ohio Sports Car Course and finished third in the championship, well back. The only other driver to win a race was Argentinean Nicolas Dapero who captured his maiden victory in the penultimate race of the season and finished fifth in points, behind Will Owen who finished on the podium in eight of the sixteen races but failed to win.

American Bobby Eberle won the National Class championship, largely uncontested.

== Drivers and teams ==
Team	No.	Drivers	Rounds
Cape Motorsports; Wayne Taylor Racing	2	(France) Nico Jamin	All
Cape Motorsports; Wayne Taylor Racing	3	(United States) Jake Eidson	1–7
Cape Motorsports; Wayne Taylor Racing	4	(Mexico) Jorge Cevallos	10–11
DEForce Racing	11	(United States) Kory Enders (N)	14–16
DEForce Racing	12	(Mexico) Moisés de la Vara (N)	14–16
JDC MotorSports	13	(United States) Bobby Eberle (N)	5–6, 8–16
JDC MotorSports	21	(Mexico) Jorge Cevallos	1–4
JDC MotorSports	44	(United States) Kevin Davis (N)	5–6, 8–9
Juncos Racing	00	(Australia) Jake Parsons	All
Juncos Racing	5	(Canada) Garett Grist	1–7
Juncos Racing	23	(United States) Will Owen	All
Juncos Racing	31	(Argentina) Nicolás Dapero	All
Kaminsky Racing	57	(United States) Bob Kaminsky (N)	5–6, 8–9, 12–13
M1 Racing	37	(United States) Jay Horak (N)	1–2, 5–6
Team Pelfrey	80	(Mexico) Patricio O'Ward	All
Team Pelfrey	81	(Malaysia) Weiron Tan	1–4
Team Pelfrey	81	(United States) TJ Fischer	8–16
Team Pelfrey	82	(United States) Aaron Telitz	All
World Speed Motorsports	7	(United States) Dan Swanbeck (N)	14–16
World Speed Motorsports	13	(United States) Bobby Eberle	1–2
World Speed Motorsports	32	(United Kingdom) Joseph Burton-Harris	14–16

Icon	Class
(N)	National Class

== Race calendar and results ==
Rnd	Circuit	Location	Date	Pole position	Fastest lap	Most laps led	Winning driver	Winning team
1	Streets of St. Petersburg	St. Petersburg, Florida	March 12	(Mexico) Patricio O'Ward	(Mexico) Patricio O'Ward	(Mexico) Patricio O'Ward	(Mexico) Patricio O'Ward	Team Pelfrey
2	Streets of St. Petersburg	St. Petersburg, Florida	March 13	(United States) Aaron Telitz	(Mexico) Patricio O'Ward	(United States) Aaron Telitz	(United States) Aaron Telitz	Team Pelfrey
3	Indy Grand Prix of Alabama	Birmingham, Alabama	April 23	(United States) Aaron Telitz	(Mexico) Patricio O'Ward	(United States) Aaron Telitz	(Mexico) Patricio O'Ward	Team Pelfrey
4	Indy Grand Prix of Alabama	Birmingham, Alabama	April 24	(Mexico) Patricio O'Ward	(United States) Aaron Telitz	(Mexico) Patricio O'Ward	(Mexico) Patricio O'Ward	Team Pelfrey
5	Indianapolis Motor Speedway road course	Speedway, Indiana	May 13	(Mexico) Patricio O'Ward	(Mexico) Patricio O'Ward	(Mexico) Patricio O'Ward	(Mexico) Patricio O'Ward	Team Pelfrey
6	Indianapolis Motor Speedway road course	Speedway, Indiana	May 14	(Mexico) Patricio O'Ward	(Mexico) Patricio O'Ward	(Mexico) Patricio O'Ward	(Mexico) Patricio O'Ward	Team Pelfrey
7	Lucas Oil Raceway at Indianapolis	Brownsburg, Indiana	May 27	(Mexico) Patricio O'Ward	(Mexico) Patricio O'Ward	(Mexico) Patricio O'Ward	(Mexico) Patricio O'Ward	Team Pelfrey
8	Grand Prix of Road America	Elkhart Lake, Wisconsin	June 25	(United States) Aaron Telitz	(France) Nico Jamin	(United States) Aaron Telitz	(United States) Aaron Telitz	Team Pelfrey
9	Grand Prix of Road America	Elkhart Lake, Wisconsin	June 25	(United States) Aaron Telitz	(United States) Aaron Telitz	(United States) Aaron Telitz	(United States) Aaron Telitz	Team Pelfrey
10	Grand Prix of Toronto	Toronto	July 16	(United States) Aaron Telitz	(United States) Aaron Telitz	(United States) Aaron Telitz	(United States) Aaron Telitz	Team Pelfrey
11	Grand Prix of Toronto	Toronto	July 17	(United States) Aaron Telitz	(United States) Aaron Telitz	(United States) Aaron Telitz	(United States) Aaron Telitz	Team Pelfrey
12	Mid-Ohio Sports Car Course	Lexington, Ohio	July 30	(France) Nico Jamin	(France) Nico Jamin	(France) Nico Jamin	(France) Nico Jamin	Cape Motorsports with WTR
13	Mid-Ohio Sports Car Course	Lexington, Ohio	July 30	(United States) Aaron Telitz	(Mexico) Patricio O'Ward	(France) Nico Jamin	(France) Nico Jamin	Cape Motorsports with WTR
14	Mazda Raceway Laguna Seca	Salinas, California	September 10	(United States) Aaron Telitz	(Mexico) Patricio O'Ward	(Mexico) Patricio O'Ward	(Mexico) Patricio O'Ward	Team Pelfrey
15	Mazda Raceway Laguna Seca	Salinas, California	September 11	(United States) Aaron Telitz	(Argentina) Nicolás Dapero	(Argentina) Nicolás Dapero	(Argentina) Nicolás Dapero	Juncos Racing
16	Mazda Raceway Laguna Seca	Salinas, California	September 11	(United States) Aaron Telitz	(Argentina) Nicolás Dapero	(United States) Aaron Telitz	(United States) Aaron Telitz	Team Pelfrey

Oval/Speedway
Road Course
Temporary Street Circuit

== Championship standings ==
=== Drivers' championship ===
Pos	Driver	STP		ALA		IMS		LOR	ROA		TOR		MOH		LAG			Pts
1	(United States) Aaron Telitz	2	**1***	**2***	2	7	2	5	**1***	**1***	**1***	**1***	2	**3**	**2**	**5**	**1***	421
2	(Mexico) Patricio O'Ward	**1***	2	1	**1***	**1***	**1***	**1***	4	4	9	2	7	4	1*	10	6	393
3	(France) Nico Jamin	4	4	6	4	5	4	7	10	2	2	3	**1***	1*	4	3	4	331
4	(United States) Will Owen	9	6	5	5	2	3	6	3	3	4	4	3	2	11	2	2	317
5	(Argentina) Nicolas Dapero	10	10	7	7	8	8	3	2	5	5	9	5	8	3	1*	3	278
6	(Australia) Jake Parsons	8	5	10	9	3	6	4	6	9	3	5	4	7	5	12	5	258
7	(United States) TJ Fischer								5	6	6	6	6	5	6	11	7	137
8	(Canada) Garett Grist	6	8	3	3	4	5	2										133
9	(United States) Jake Eidson	3	7	8	6	6	7	8										106
10	(Mexico) Jorge Cevallos	7	9	9	8						8	7						79
11	(Malaysia) Weiron Tan	5	3	4	10													69
12	(United Kingdom) Joseph Burton-Harris														10	4	8	46
13	(United States) Bobby Eberle	11	11															20
National class
1	(United States) Bobby Eberle					9	9		7	7	7	8	8	6	7	9	11	225
2	(United States) Bob Kaminsky					10	11		8	10			9	9				102
3	(United States) Jay Horak	12	12			11	12											71
4	(United States) Kevin Davis					12	10		9	8								63
5	(Mexico) Moisés de la Vara														8	6	12	52
6	(United States) Dan Swanbeck														9	7	10	51
7	(United States) Kory Enders														12	8	9	49
Pos	Driver	STP		ALA		IMS		LOR	ROA		TOR		MOH		LAG			Pts

Color	Result
Gold	Winner
Silver	2nd place
Bronze	3rd place
Green	4th & 5th place
Light Blue	6th–10th place
Dark Blue	Finished (Outside Top 10)
Purple	Did not finish
Red	Did not qualify (DNQ)
Brown	Withdrawn (Wth)
Black	Disqualified (DSQ)
White	Did not start (DNS)
Blank	Did not participate (DNP)
Blank	Not competing

**In-line notation**
**Bold**	Pole position (1 point)
Italics	Ran fastest race lap (1 point)
*	Led most race laps (1 point)
^{1}	Qualifying cancelled no bonus point awarded
Rookie

- Ties in points broken by number of wins, or best finishes.

=== Teams' championship ===
Pos	Team	Points
1	Team Pelfrey	553
2	Juncos Racing	445
3	Cape Motorsports w/ Wayne Taylor Racing	327

== See also ==
2016 IndyCar Series season
2016 Indy Lights season
