= Will Owen (racing driver) =

American racing driver

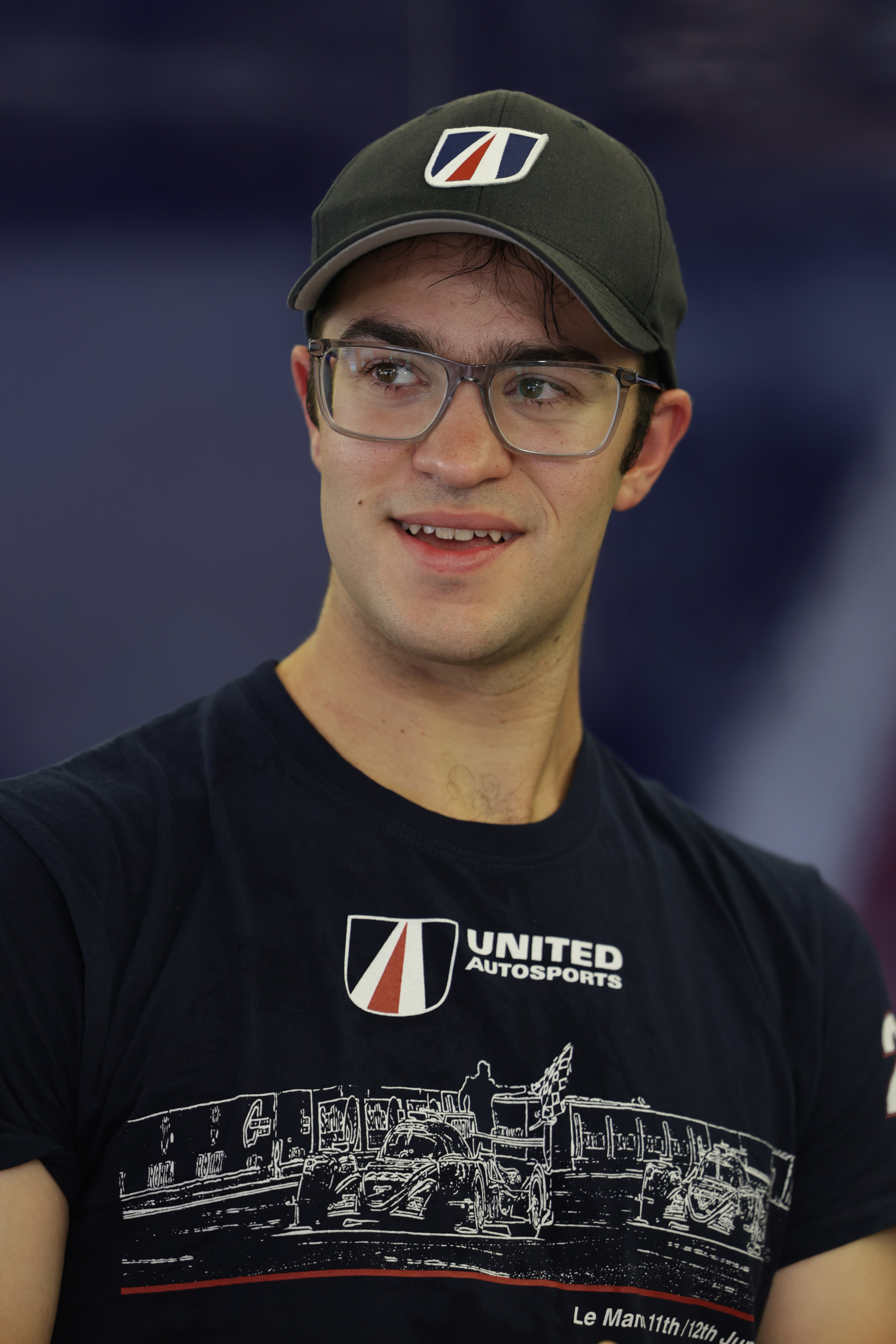
- Owen during the 2022 8 Hours of Bahrain.
- Nationality: (United States) American
- Born: March 23, 1995 (age 31) Castle Rock, Colorado, US

WEC career
- Debut season: 2017
- Categorisation: FIA Silver (until 2022); FIA Gold (2023–)
- Teams: United Autosports
- Car number: 22
- Starts: 10 (10 entries)
- Wins: 0
- Podiums: 1
- Poles: 0
- Fastest laps: 0
- Best finish: 9th in 2022

Previous series
- 2017-2020 2015-2016 2014: European Le Mans Series; Pro Mazda Championship; U.S. F2000 National Championship

William Owen (born 23 March 1995 in Castle Rock, Colorado, US) is an American racing driver. He attended high school at Valor Christian High School prior to attending TCU for university. He competed in the 2022 season of the FIA World Endurance Championship with United Autosports.

== Racing record ==
=== Career summary ===
Season	Series	Team	Races	Wins	Poles	F/Laps	Podiums	Points	Position
2013	SCCA June Sprints Formula Mazda	GK Motorsports	1	0	0	0	0	0	11th
2014	USF2000 National Championship	Pabst Racing Services	14	1	0	0	1	133	12th
2014	U.S. F2000 Winterfest	Pabst Racing Services	6	0	0	0	0	54	11th
2015	Pro Mazda Championship	Juncos Racing	16	0	0	0	3	243	7th
2015	Pro Mazda Winterfest	Juncos Racing	5	0	0	1	2	83	6th
2016	Toyota Racing Series	Giles Motorsport	15	0	0	0	0	361	14th
2016	Pro Mazda Championship	Juncos Racing	16	0	0	0	8	317	4th
2017	IMSA SportsCar Championship - Prototype	PR1/Mathiasen Motorsports	1	0	0	0	0	26	31st
2017	European Le Mans Series - LMP2	United Autosports	6	2	0	0	3	98	2nd
2017	24 Hours of Le Mans - LMP2	United Autosports	1	0	0	0	0	N/A	4th
2018	IMSA SportsCar Championship - Prototype	United Autosports	2	0	0	0	0	69	29th
2018	IMSA SportsCar Championship - Prototype	AFS/PR1 Mathiasen Motorsports	1	0	0	0	0	69	29th
2018	European Le Mans Series - LMP2	United Autosports	6	0	0	0	1	23	13th
2018	24 Hours of Le Mans - LMP2	United Autosports	1	0	0	0	1	N/A	3rd
2018	IMSA Prototype Challenge - LMP3	Charles Wicht Racing	1	0	0	0	1	30	36th
2019	IMSA SportsCar Championship - DPi	Juncos Racing	8	0	0	0	0	177	12th
2019	European Le Mans Series -LMP2	United Autosports	5	0	0	0	1	37	13th
2019	24 Hours of Le Mans - LMP2	United Autosports	1	0	0	0	0	N/A	14th
2020	European Le Mans Series - LMP2	United Autosports	5	1	0	0	2	70	2nd
2020	24 Hours of Le Mans - LMP2	United Autosports	1	0	0	0	0	N/A	13th
2022	FIA World Endurance Championship - LMP2	United Autosports USA	6	0	1	0	0	50	9th
2022	24 Hours of Le Mans - LMP2	United Autosports USA	1	0	0	0	0	N/A	10th
2022	IMSA SportsCar Championship - LMP2	United Autosports	1	0	0	0	0	0	NC†
2023	GT4 America Series - Pro-Am	Valkyrie Velocity Racing	3	0	0	0	0	4*	17th*

† As Owen was a guest driver, he was ineligible to score championship points.
^{*} Season still in progress.

== Motorsports career results ==
=== American open–wheel racing results ===
==== U.S. F2000 National Championship ====
Year	Team	1	2	3	4	5	6	7	8	9	10	11	12	13	14	Rank	Points
2014	Pabst Racing Services	STP; 18	STP; 6	BAR; 11	BAR; 14	IMS; 1	IMS; 8	LOR; 15	TOR; 17	TOR; 22	MOH; 13	MOH; 10	MOH; 12	SNM; 14	SNM; 12	**12th**	**133**

==== Pro Mazda Championship ====
Year	Team	1	2	3	4	5	6	7	8	9	10	11	12	13	14	15	16	17	Rank	Points
2015	Juncos Racing	STP; 8	STP; 8	LOU; 13	LOU; C	BAR; 9	BAR; 4	IMS; 8	IMS; 8	IMS; 2	LOR; 2	TOR; 15	TOR; 8	IOW; 10	MOH; 8	MOH; 5	LAG; 3	LAG; 4	**7th**	**243**
2016	Juncos Racing	STP; 9	STP; 6	ALA; 5	ALA; 5	IMS; 2	IMS; 3	LOR; 6	ROA; 3	ROA; 3	TOR; 4	TOR; 4	MOH; 3	MOH; 2	LAG; 11	LAG; 2	LAG; 2		**4th**	**317**

=== WeatherTech SportsCar Championship ===
Year	Entrant	Class	Chassis	Engine	1	2	3	4	5	6	7	8	9	10	Rank	Points
2017	PR1/Mathiasen Motorsports	P	Ligier JS P217	Gibson GK428 4.2 L V8	DAY	SEB	LBH; 5	COA	DET	WGL	MOS	ELK	LGA	PET	31st	26
2018	United Autosports	P	Ligier JS P217	Gibson GK428 4.2 L V8	DAY; 4	SEB	LBH	MOH	DET						29th	69
2018	AFS/PR1 Mathiasen Motorsports	P	Oreca 07	Gibson GK428 4.2 L V8						WGL; 9	MOS	ELK	LGA	PET; 12	29th	69
2019	Juncos Racing	DPi	Cadillac DPi-V.R	Cadillac 5.5 L V8	DAY; 8	SEB; 10	LBH; 7	MOH; 9	DET; 8	WGL; 8	MOS; 11	ELK	LGA	PET; 10	12th	177
2022	United Autosports	LMP2	Oreca 07	Gibson GK428 V8	DAY; 6†	SEB	LGA	MOH	WGL	ELK	PET				NC†	0†

^{†} Points only counted towards the Michelin Endurance Cup, and not the overall LMP2 Championship.

=== Complete FIA World Endurance Championship results ===
(key) (Races in bold indicate pole position) (Races in italics indicate fastest lap)

Year	Entrant	Class	Car	Engine	1	2	3	4	5	6	DC	Points
2022	United Autosports USA	LMP2	Oreca 07	Gibson GK428 4.2 L V8	SEB; 7	SPA; 5	LMS; 10	MNZ; 13	FUJ; 7	BHR; 6	9th	50

=== Le Mans 24 Hours results ===
Year	Team	Co-Drivers	Car	Class	Laps	Pos.	Class Pos.
2017	(United States) United Autosports	(Switzerland) Hugo de Sadeleer (Portugal) Filipe Albuquerque	Ligier JS P217-Gibson	LMP2	362	5th	4th
2018	(United States) United Autosports	(Switzerland) Hugo de Sadeleer (Colombia) Juan Pablo Montoya	Ligier JS P217-Gibson	LMP2	365	7th	**3rd**
2019	(United States) United Autosports	(United Kingdom) Alex Brundle (Republic of Ireland) Ryan Cullen	Ligier JS P217-Gibson	LMP2	348	19th	14th
2020	(United States) United Autosports	(United Kingdom) Alex Brundle (Netherlands) Job van Uitert	Oreca 07-Gibson	LMP2	359	17th	13th
2022	(United States) United Autosports USA	(Portugal) Filipe Albuquerque (United Kingdom) Phil Hanson	Oreca 07-Gibson	LMP2	366	14th	10th
