= Nicolás Dapero =

Argentinian racing driver

Nicolás Dapero (born January 31, 1998) is an Argentine racing driver from Buenos Aires.

Dapero began karting in Argentina in 2012. By 2014, he had moved up to car racing in Argentina. In 2015, he joined Juncos Racing's driver development program and embarked on a testing program. In 2016 he raced in the Pro Mazda Championship with Juncos and finished fifth in points with one win, coming in the penultimate race of the season at Mazda Raceway Laguna Seca. In 2017, he competed in Indy Lights with Juncos Racing. This was announced after completing several Indy Lights test sessions with Juncos in late 2016. He finished thirteenth in the championship with a best finish of fifth on the oval at Gateway Motorsports Park.

== Racing record ==
=== Career summary ===
Season	Series	Team	Races	Wins	Poles	F/Laps	Podiums	Points	Position
2014	Fórmula Metropolitana	Federal Seguros Racing	12	0	1	0	1	70	8th
2015	Formula 3 Brasil	Prop Car Racing	12	0	0	1	5	66	6th
2015	Fórmula Metropolitana	Federal Group	1	0	0	0	0	7	23rd
2015	Formula Renault 2.0 Argentina	LDR	4	0	0	0	0	11	21st
2016	Pro Mazda Championship	Juncos Racing	16	1	0	2	5	278	5th
2016	Toyota Racing Series	Giles Motorsport	15	0	0	0	0	240	18th
2017	Indy Lights	Juncos Racing	16	0	0	0	0	187	13th
2018	TC2000	Ambrogio Racing	22	2	0	0	3	183	11th

=== Complete Formula 3 Brasil results ===
(key) (Races in bold indicate pole position) (Races in italics indicate fastest lap)

Year	Entrant	1	2	3	4	5	6	7	8	9	10	11	12	13	14	15	16	Pos	Points
2015	Prop Car Racing	CUR1; 1	CUR1; 2	VEL; 1	VEL; 2	SCS; 1 Ret	SCS; 2; 3	CUR2; 1; 2	CUR2; 2; 10	CAS; 1; 3	CAS; 2; 2	CGR; 1 Ret	CGR; 2; 3	CUR3; 1; 5	CUR3; 2; 4	INT; 1 Ret	INT; 2 Ret	6th	66

=== American open–wheel racing results ===
==== Pro Mazda Championship ====
Year	Team	1	2	3	4	5	6	7	8	9	10	11	12	13	14	15	16	Rank	Points
2016	Juncos Racing	STP; 10	STP; 10	ALA; 7	ALA; 7	IMS; 8	IMS; 8	LOR; 3	ROA; 2	ROA; 5	TOR; 5	TOR; 9	MOH; 5	MOH; 8	LAG; 3	LAG; 1	LAG; 3	**5th**	**278**

==== Indy Lights ====
Year	Team	1	2	3	4	5	6	7	8	9	10	11	12	13	14	15	16	Rank	Points
2017	Juncos Racing	STP; 9	STP; 8	ALA; 9	ALA; 6	IMS; 11	IMS; 8	INDY; 12	ROA; 14	ROA; 12	IOW; 12	TOR; 7	TOR; 7	MOH; 14	MOH; 8	GMP; 5	WGL; 8	13th	187
