= 2001 Target Grand Prix of Chicago =

Coordinates: 41°49′50″N 87°44′55″W

(United States) 2001 Target Grand Prix
Race details
- Race 12 of 21 in the 2001 CART season
- Date: July 29, 2001
- Official name: 2001 Target Grand Prix Presented by Energizer
- Location: Chicago Motor Speedway, Cicero, Illinois, United States
- Course: Oval; 1.029 mi / 1.656 km
- Distance: 225 laps 231.525 mi / 372.6 km

Pole position
- Driver: (Brazil) (Brazil) Tony Kanaan (Mo Nunn Racing)
- Time: 23.145

Fastest lap
- Driver: (Sweden) (Sweden) Kenny Bräck (Team Rahal)
- Time: 24.687 (on lap 164 of 225)

Podium
- First: (Sweden) (Sweden) Kenny Bräck (Team Rahal)
- Second: (Canada) (Canada) Patrick Carpentier (Forsythe Racing)
- Third: (Brazil) (Brazil) Gil de Ferran (Team Penske)

The 2001 Target Grand Prix, known informally as the 2001 Grand Prix of Chicago, was a Championship Auto Racing Teams (CART) motor race held on July 29, 2001, at Chicago Motor Speedway in Cicero, Illinois, USA. It was the 12th round of the 2001 CART FedEx Championship Series season. Kenny Bräck won his third race of the season and of his CART career for Team Rahal ahead of Patrick Carpentier and Gil de Ferran.

Bräck's quick pace allowed him to make up ground in the second half of the race and ultimately win the race itself, further distancing himself from second place Hélio Castroneves in the drivers' standings. Carpentier and Forsythe Racing were in the middle of a powerful surge in form, with teammates earning podiums at Cleveland and Toronto and Carpentier taking his first career win just a week earlier at the Michigan 500. de Ferran was also beginning an improvement in form and consistency that would make him a championship contender at the end of the season.

The race saw much clean on-track action and multiple lead changes, something that was not common for open-wheel cars on oval tracks. Only three cars retired from the race, and only one was a result of contact with the barriers.

== Qualifying ==
July 28, 2001 - Qualifying Speeds
Rank	Driver	Time	Leader	Speed (mph)	Team
1	(Brazil) Tony Kanaan	23.145	—	160.052	Mo Nunn Racing
2	(Brazil) Hélio Castroneves	23.148	+0.003	160.031	Team Penske
3	(Mexico) Adrian Fernández	23.203	+0.058	159.652	Fernandez Racing
4	(United States) Memo Gidley	23.221	+0.076	159.528	Chip Ganassi Racing
5	(Italy) Alex Zanardi	23.315	+0.170	158.885	Mo Nunn Racing
6	(United States) Jimmy Vasser	23.317	+0.172	158.871	Patrick Racing
7	(Brazil) Roberto Moreno	23.327	+0.182	158.803	Patrick Racing
8	(Sweden) Kenny Bräck	23.340	+0.195	158.715	Team Rahal
9	(Canada) Patrick Carpentier	23.371	+0.226	158.504	Forsythe Racing
10	(Scotland) Dario Franchitti	23.395	+0.250	158.342	Team Green
11	(Brazil) Bruno Junqueira (R)	23.409	+0.264	158.247	Chip Ganassi Racing
12	(Brazil) Gil de Ferran	23.458	+0.313	157.916	Team Penske
13	(Brazil) Maurício Gugelmin	23.459	+0.314	157.910	PacWest Racing
14	(Canada) Alex Tagliani	23.471	+0.326	157.829	Forsythe Racing
15	(United States) Bryan Herta	23.498	+0.353	157.647	Forsythe Racing
16	(Japan) Shinji Nakano	23.501	+0.356	157.627	Fernandez Racing
17	(United States) Michael Andretti	23.513	+0.368	157.547	Team Motorola
18	(Japan) Tora Takagi (R)	23.539	+0.394	157.373	Walker Motorsport
19	(New Zealand) Scott Dixon (R)	23.568	+0.423	157.179	PacWest Racing
20	(Brazil) Cristiano da Matta	23.592	+0.447	157.019	Newman-Haas Racing
21	(Spain) Oriol Servià	23.678	+0.533	156.449	Sigma Autosport
22	(Canada) Paul Tracy	23.742	+0.597	156.027	Team Green
23	(Mexico) Michel Jourdain Jr.	23.805	+0.660	155.614	Bettenhausen Racing
24	(Brazil) Christian Fittipaldi	23.957	+0.812	154.627	Newman-Haas Racing
25	(Italy) Max Papis	23.984	+0.839	154.453	Team Rahal

== Race ==
Pos	No	Driver	Team	Laps	Time/retired	Grid	Points
1	8	(Sweden) Kenny Bräck	Team Rahal	225	1:45:12.835	8	20
2	32	(Canada) Patrick Carpentier	Forsythe Racing	225	+4.480	9	16
3	1	(Brazil) Gil de Ferran	Team Penske	225	+5.190	12	14
4	18	(New Zealand) Scott Dixon (R)	PacWest Racing	225	+5.563	19	12
5	12	(United States) Memo Gidley	Chip Ganassi Racing	225	+9.651	4	10
6	33	(Canada) Alex Tagliani	Forsythe Racing	225	+13.037	14	8
7	3	(Brazil) Hélio Castroneves	Team Penske	225	+13.597	2	7^{1}
8	55	(Brazil) Tony Kanaan	Mo Nunn Racing	225	+14.558	1	6^{2}
9	66	(Italy) Alex Zanardi	Mo Nunn Racing	225	+17.157	5	4
10	51	(Mexico) Adrian Fernández	Fernandez Racing	225	+20.914	3	3
11	5	(Japan) Tora Takagi (R)	Walker Motorsport	225	+21.199	18	2
12	26	(Canada) Paul Tracy	Team Green	225	+22.098	22	1
13	7	(Italy) Max Papis	Team Rahal	225	+39.483	25	—
14	40	(United States) Jimmy Vasser	Patrick Racing	224	+1 Lap	6	—
15	27	(Scotland) Dario Franchitti	Team Green	224	+1 Lap	10	—
16	52	(Japan) Shinji Nakano	Fernandez Racing	224	+1 Lap	16	—
17	4	(Brazil) Bruno Junqueira (R)	Chip Ganassi Racing	223	+2 Laps	11	—
18	22	(Spain) Oriol Servià	Sigma Autosport	223	+2 Laps	21	—
19	6	(Brazil) Cristiano da Matta	Newman-Haas Racing	223	+2 Laps	20	—
20	20	(Brazil) Roberto Moreno	Patrick Racing	223	+2 Laps	7	—
21	77	(United States) Bryan Herta	Forsythe Racing	222	+3 Laps	15	—
22	17	(Brazil) Maurício Gugelmin	PacWest Racing	220	+5 Laps	13	—
23	16	(Mexico) Michel Jourdain Jr.	Bettenhausen Racing	189	Contact	23	—
24	39	(United States) Michael Andretti	Team Motorola	187	Engine	17	—
25	11	(Brazil) Christian Fittipaldi	Newman-Haas Racing	102	Engine	24	—

Notes

- ^{1}– Includes one bonus point for leading the most laps.
- ^{2}– Includes one bonus point for being the fastest qualifier.

== Race statistics ==
- Lead changes: 14 among 9 drivers

Lap Leaders
Laps	Leader
1–47	Tony Kanaan
48-79	Helio Castroneves
80-81	Tony Kanaan
82	Jimmy Vasser
83	Roberto Moreno
84-89	Scott Dixon
90-121	Helio Castroneves
122-161	Kenny Bräck
162-165	Helio Castroneves
166-167	Tony Kanaan
168	Adrian Fernández
169-187	Dario Franchitti
188-196	Memo Gidley
197-206	Scott Dixon
207-225	Kenny Bräck

Total laps led
Leader	Laps
Helio Castroneves	68
Kenny Bräck	59
Tony Kanaan	51
Dario Franchitti	19
Scott Dixon	16
Memo Gidley	9
Jimmy Vasser	1
Roberto Moreno	1
Adrian Fernández	1

Cautions: 2 for 20 laps
Laps	Reason
112-121	Jourdain Jr. spins in Turn 1
200-211	Gugelmin spins in Turn 1

== Standings after the race ==
Drivers' standings

Pos	+/-	Driver	Points
1		(Sweden) Kenny Bräck	104
2	1	(Brazil) Hélio Castroneves	82
3	1	(Scotland) Dario Franchitti	81
4		(United States) Michael Andretti	73
5	1	(Brazil) Gil de Ferran	72

Constructors' standings

Pos	+/–	Constructor	Points
1		(United Kingdom) Reynard	207
2		(United Kingdom) Lola	186

Manufacturer's Standings

Pos	+/-	Manufacturer	Points
1		(Japan) Honda	190
2	1	(United Kingdom) Ford-Cosworth	171
3	1	(Japan) Toyota	166
4		(United Kingdom) Phoenix	0

Previous race: 2001 Harrah's 500	CART FedEx Championship Series; 2001 season	Next race: 2001 Miller Lite 200
Previous race: 2000 Grand Prix of Chicago	Target Grand Prix	Next race: 2002 Grand Prix of Chicago
