= 2001 CART FedEx Championship Series =

American motorsport season

2001 CART season
- FedEx Championship Series

Season
- Races: 21
- Start date: March 11
- End date: November 4

Awards
- Drivers' champion: (Brazil) Gil de Ferran
- Constructors' Cup: (United Kingdom) Reynard
- Manufacturers' Cup: (Japan) Honda
- Nations' Cup: Brazil
- Rookie of the Year: (New Zealand) Scott Dixon

The 2001 CART FedEx Championship Series was the 23rd season of the FedEx Championship Series, the premier series sanctioned by Championship Auto Racing Teams (CART), and encompassed the 90th season of American open-wheel car racing alongside the rivaling 2001 Indy Racing Northern Light Series. The season consisted of 21 races, beginning in Monterrey, Mexico on March 11 and ending in Fontana, California on November 4. The Drivers' Championship was won by Gil de Ferran, the Constructors' Cup by Reynard, and the Manufacturers' Cup by Honda.

Off the track, the 2001 season was an unmitigated disaster for CART under the leadership of Joseph Heitzler. It included two race cancellations in Rio de Janeiro and Texas; a disastrous European tour that coincided with the September 11 attacks and witnessed a severe accident to former series champion Alex Zanardi in which he lost both of his legs; infighting amongst engine manufacturers that saw litigation and the announced future departure of Honda and Toyota; the loss of the series' television contract with ABC/ESPN; the departure of longtime tracks Michigan International Speedway and Nazareth Speedway; the loss of Firestone as the series' tire supplier and its replacement by parent company Bridgestone; and the defection of Team Penske to the rival Indy Racing League (IRL) at the conclusion of the season.

Team Penske and Team Motorola joined Chip Ganassi Racing in having concurrent IRL teams to run in the 2001 Indianapolis 500, with Penske's Helio Castroneves winning the race. In an unusual move, CART "sanctioned" the participation of teams in the race; this was an attempt to allow Penske's primary sponsor, Marlboro, to appear on cars in the 500, as they were prohibited from being in more than one racing series by the Tobacco Master Settlement Agreement. This legal maneuver was not successful, and Penske's cars ran without advertising.

== Teams and drivers ==
The following teams and drivers competed in the 2001 CART FedEx Championship Series. All teams competed with tires supplied by Firestone.

| Team | Chassis | Engine | No. | Driver | Rounds |
|---|---|---|---|---|---|
| (United States) Team Penske | Reynard 01I | Honda HR-1 | 1 | (Brazil) Gil de Ferran | All |
| (United States) Team Penske | Reynard 01I | Honda HR-1 | 3 | (Brazil) Hélio Castroneves | All |
| (United States) Chip Ganassi Racing | Lola B01/00 | Toyota RV8E | 4 | (Brazil) Bruno Junqueira | All |
| (United States) Chip Ganassi Racing | Lola B01/00 | Toyota RV8E | 12 | (France) Nicolas Minassian | 1–7 |
| (United States) Chip Ganassi Racing | Lola B01/00 | Toyota RV8E | 12 | (United States) Memo Gidley | 8–21 |
| (United States) Walker Motorsport | Reynard 01I | Toyota RV8E | 5 | (Japan) Toranosuke Takagi | All |
| (United States) Newman/Haas Racing | Lola B01/00 | Toyota RV8E | 6 | (Brazil) Cristiano da Matta | All |
| (United States) Newman/Haas Racing | Lola B01/00 | Toyota RV8E | 11 | (Brazil) Christian Fittipaldi | All |
| (United States) Team Rahal | Lola B01/00 | Ford-Cosworth XF | 7 | (Italy) Max Papis | All |
| (United States) Team Rahal | Lola B01/00 | Ford-Cosworth XF | 8 | (Sweden) Kenny Bräck | All |
| (United States) Bettenhausen Racing | Lola B01/00 | Ford-Cosworth XF | 16 | (Mexico) Michel Jourdain Jr. | All |
| (United States) PacWest Racing | Reynard 01I | Toyota RV8E | 17 | (Brazil) Maurício Gugelmin | All |
| (United States) PacWest Racing | Reynard 01I | Toyota RV8E | 18 | (New Zealand) Scott Dixon | All |
| (United States) Patrick Racing | Reynard 01I | Toyota RV8E | 19 | (United States) Townsend Bell | 16–17 |
| (United States) Patrick Racing | Reynard 01I | Toyota RV8E | 20 | (Brazil) Roberto Moreno | All |
| (United States) Patrick Racing | Reynard 01I | Toyota RV8E | 40 | (United States) Jimmy Vasser | All |
| (United States) Dale Coyne Racing | Lola B2K/00 | Ford-Cosworth XF | 19 | (Germany) Michael Krumm | 1–2 |
| (United States) Dale Coyne Racing | Lola B2K/00 | Ford-Cosworth XF | 21 | (Brazil) Luiz Garcia Jr. | 1–2 |
| (United States) Sigma Autosport | Lola B01/00 | Ford-Cosworth XF | 22 | (Spain) Oriol Servià | All |
| (United States) Arciero-Blair Racing | Lola B2K/00 | Phoenix | 25 | (Brazil) Max Wilson | 1–4 |
| (United States) Arciero-Blair Racing | Lola B2K/00 | Ford-Cosworth XF | 25 | (Brazil) Max Wilson | 6–11, 13–19 |
| (United States) Arciero-Blair Racing | Lola B2K/00 | Ford-Cosworth XF | 25 | (United States) Alex Barron | 20–21 |
| (United States) Team Green | Reynard 01I | Honda HR-1 | 26 | (Canada) Paul Tracy | All |
| (United States) Team Green | Reynard 01I | Honda HR-1 | 27 | (United Kingdom) Dario Franchitti | All |
| (United States) Team Motorola | Reynard 01I | Honda HR-1 | 39 | (United States) Michael Andretti | All |
| (United States) Forsythe Racing | Reynard 01I | Ford-Cosworth XF | 32 | (Canada) Patrick Carpentier | All |
| (United States) Forsythe Racing | Reynard 01I | Ford-Cosworth XF | 33 | (Canada) Alex Tagliani | All |
| (United States) Forsythe Racing | Reynard 01I | Ford-Cosworth XF | 77 | (United States) Bryan Herta | All |
| (Mexico) Fernández Racing | Reynard 01I | Honda HR-1 | 51 | (Mexico) Adrián Fernández | All |
| (Mexico) Fernández Racing | Reynard 01I | Honda HR-1 | 52 | (Japan) Shinji Nakano | All |
| (United States) Mo Nunn Racing | Reynard 01I | Honda HR-1 | 55 | (Brazil) Tony Kanaan | All |
| (United States) Mo Nunn Racing | Reynard 01I | Honda HR-1 | 66 | (Italy) Alex Zanardi | 1–16 |
| (United States) Mo Nunn Racing | Reynard 01I | Honda HR-1 | 66 | (United States) Casey Mears | 18–21 |

=== Team changes ===
Chip Ganassi Racing's success with Toyota in the 2000 season increased demand for their RV8 engine, with Walker Motorsport, Newman/Haas Racing, PacWest Racing, and Patrick Racing switching to the engine for 2001. Because of the overwhelming engine production, Toyota ceased their support of two teams, Della Penna Motorsports and PPI Motorsports, forcing both to shut down their CART operations at the end of 2000; PPI Motorsports shifted their efforts to the NASCAR Winston Cup Series.

PacWest Racing was one of four teams that fielded cars powered by Mercedes-Benz engines in the previous season, but was forced to switch to a different engine supplier after DaimlerChrysler—Mercedes-Benz's parent company—announced their departure from the series at the season's end in order to exclusively focus on their Formula One program. Ilmor, the company responsible for building Mercedes-Benz's CART engines, chose to stay in the sport and supply their own engines, named the Phoenix, for Arciero-Brooke Racing, though the team resorted to Ford-Cosworth's XF engine starting from the Miller Lite 225. As for the other teams, Bettenhausen Racing also ran the XF engine, while Mo Nunn Racing used Honda's new HR-1 engine alongside four other teams, including the newly-formed Team Motorola and Fernández Racing, marking Honda's largest lineup in their history with CART.

Only two constructors, Lola and Reynard, supplied chassis for 2001 after Swift left the series following an uncompetitive 2000 season with Dale Coyne Racing. Reynard had won the Constructors' Cup the previous season and introduced their new 01I chassis.

== Schedule ==
Key
| Icon | Legend |
|---|---|
| O | Oval/Speedway |
| R | Road course |
| S | Street circuit |
| C | Cancelled race |

| Round | Race Name | Circuit | City | Date |
|---|---|---|---|---|
| 1 | (Mexico) Tecate/Telmex Grand Prix of Monterrey | R Fundidora Park | Monterrey, Mexico | March 11 |
| C | (Brazil) Rio 200 (Cancelled) | O Emerson Fittipaldi Speedway | Rio de Janeiro, Brazil | March 25 |
| 2 | (United States) Toyota Grand Prix of Long Beach | S Streets of Long Beach | Long Beach, California | April 8 |
| C | (United States) Firestone Firehawk 600 (Cancelled) | O Texas Motor Speedway | Fort Worth, Texas | April 29 |
| 3 | (United States) Lehigh Valley Grand Prix | O Nazareth Speedway | Nazareth, Pennsylvania | May 6 |
| 4 | (Japan) Firestone Firehawk 500 | O Twin Ring Motegi | Motegi, Japan | May 19 |
| 5 | (United States) Miller Lite 225 | O Milwaukee Mile | West Allis, Wisconsin | June 3 |
| 6 | (United States) Tenneco Automotive Grand Prix of Detroit | S The Raceway on Belle Isle Park | Detroit, Michigan | June 17 |
| 7 | (United States) Freightliner/G. I. Joe's 200 | R Portland International Raceway | Portland, Oregon | June 24 |
| 8 | (United States) Marconi Grand Prix of Cleveland | R Cleveland Burke Lakefront Airport | Cleveland, Ohio | July 1 |
| 9 | (Canada) Molson Indy Toronto | S Exhibition Place | Toronto, Ontario | July 15 |
| 10 | (United States) Harrah's 500 | O Michigan International Speedway | Brooklyn, Michigan | July 22 |
| 11 | (United States) Target Grand Prix of Chicago | O Chicago Motor Speedway | Cicero, Illinois | July 29 |
| 12 | (United States) Miller Lite 200 | R Mid-Ohio Sports Car Course | Lexington, Ohio | August 12 |
| 13 | (United States) Motorola 220 | R Road America | Elkhart Lake, Wisconsin | August 19 |
| 14 | (Canada) Molson Indy Vancouver | S Concord Pacific Place | Vancouver, British Columbia | September 2 |
| 15 | (Germany) The American Memorial | O EuroSpeedway Lausitz | Klettwitz, Germany | September 15 |
| 16 | (United Kingdom) Rockingham 500 | O Rockingham Motor Speedway | Corby, United Kingdom | September 22 |
| 17 | (United States) Texaco/Havoline Grand Prix of Houston | S George R. Brown Convention Center | Houston, Texas | October 7 |
| 18 | (United States) Honda Grand Prix of Monterey | R Mazda Raceway Laguna Seca | Monterey, California | October 14 |
| 19 | (Australia) Honda Indy 300 | S Surfers Paradise Street Circuit | Surfers Paradise, Australia | October 28 |
| 20 | (United States) Marlboro 500 | O California Speedway | Fontana, California | November 4 |

- The original calendar called for 22 races on five continents, by far the most ambitious calendar CART had ever attempted. With the race at Texas being canceled and the Rio 200 being dropped, the 2001 season ultimately had the same number of races as the previous year.
- For the first time, CART would race in the United Kingdom and Germany and also return to Mexico for the first time in almost twenty years.
- The original calendar released on August 5, 2000, had the first round of the season at Jacarepaguá in Brazil, but disagreements with the track owners several months later led to the event being dropped.
- The events at Homestead-Miami and Gateway were dropped after negotiations with the owners of the track; rival series Indy Racing League secured the contracts instead, and both tracks were featured in the 2001 Indy Racing League season.
- The removal of Gateway from the calendar meant that Memorial Day weekend would be empty, allowing several teams and drivers the opportunity to compete at the Indianapolis 500.
- The 2001 season was the final time Michigan Speedway appeared on the calendar.

== Results ==
| Rnd | Race Name | Pole position | Fastest lap | Lead most laps | Winning driver | Winning team | Report |
|---|---|---|---|---|---|---|---|
| 1 | (Mexico) Monterrey | (Sweden) Kenny Bräck | (United Kingdom) Dario Franchitti | (Brazil) Cristiano da Matta | (Brazil) Cristiano da Matta | Newman-Haas Racing | Report |
| 2 | (United States) Long Beach | (Brazil) Hélio Castroneves | (Brazil) Hélio Castroneves | (Brazil) Hélio Castroneves | (Brazil) Hélio Castroneves | Team Penske | Report |
| 3 | (United States) Texas | (Sweden) Kenny Bräck | Race cancelled | | | | Report |
| 4 | (United States) Nazareth | (Brazil) Bruno Junqueira | (Brazil) Tony Kanaan | (Sweden) Kenny Bräck | (New Zealand) Scott Dixon | PacWest Racing | Report |
| 5 | (Japan) Motegi | (Brazil) Hélio Castroneves | (Italy) Alex Zanardi | (Brazil) Hélio Castroneves | (Sweden) Kenny Bräck | Team Rahal | Report |
| 6 | (United States) Milwaukee | (Sweden) Kenny Bräck | (United Kingdom) Dario Franchitti | (Sweden) Kenny Bräck | (Sweden) Kenny Bräck | Team Rahal | Report |
| 7 | (United States) Belle Isle | (Brazil) Hélio Castroneves | (United States) Michael Andretti | (Brazil) Hélio Castroneves | (Brazil) Hélio Castroneves | Team Penske | Report |
| 8 | (United States) Portland | (Italy) Max Papis | (Italy) Max Papis | (Italy) Max Papis | (Italy) Max Papis | Team Rahal | Report |
| 9 | (United States) Cleveland | (Brazil) Maurício Gugelmin | (Brazil) Roberto Moreno | (United States) Memo Gidley | (United Kingdom) Dario Franchitti | Team Green | Report |
| 10 | (Canada) Toronto | (Brazil) Gil de Ferran | (Brazil) Hélio Castroneves | (Brazil) Gil de Ferran | (United States) Michael Andretti | Team Motorola | Report |
| 11 | (United States) Michigan | (Sweden) Kenny Bräck | (Canada) Patrick Carpentier | (Italy) Max Papis | (Canada) Patrick Carpentier | Forsythe Racing | Report |
| 12 | (United States) Chicago | (Brazil) Tony Kanaan | (Sweden) Kenny Bräck | (Brazil) Hélio Castroneves | (Sweden) Kenny Bräck | Team Rahal | Report |
| 13 | (United States) Mid-Ohio | (Brazil) Gil de Ferran | (Brazil) Hélio Castroneves | (Brazil) Hélio Castroneves | (Brazil) Hélio Castroneves | Team Penske | Report |
| 14 | (United States) Road America | (Sweden) Kenny Bräck | (Brazil) Bruno Junqueira | (Brazil) Hélio Castroneves | (Brazil) Bruno Junqueira | Chip Ganassi Racing | Report |
| 15 | (Canada) Vancouver | (Canada) Alex Tagliani | (Brazil) Hélio Castroneves | (Canada) Alex Tagliani | (Brazil) Roberto Moreno | Patrick Racing | Report |
| 16 | (Germany) EuroSpeedway | (Brazil) Gil de Ferran | (Brazil) Tony Kanaan | (Sweden) Kenny Bräck | (Sweden) Kenny Bräck | Team Rahal | Report |
| 17 | (United Kingdom) Rockingham | (Sweden) Kenny Bräck | (Canada) Patrick Carpentier | (Brazil) Gil de Ferran | (Brazil) Gil de Ferran | Team Penske | Report |
| 18 | (United States) Houston | (Brazil) Gil de Ferran | (United States) Jimmy Vasser | (Brazil) Gil de Ferran | (Brazil) Gil de Ferran | Team Penske | Report |
| 19 | (United States) Laguna Seca | (Brazil) Gil de Ferran | (Brazil) Hélio Castroneves | (Brazil) Gil de Ferran | (Italy) Max Papis | Team Rahal | Report |
| 20 | (Australia) Surfers Paradise | (Brazil) Roberto Moreno | (United States) Jimmy Vasser | (Brazil) Roberto Moreno | (Brazil) Cristiano da Matta | Newman-Haas Racing | Report |
| 21 | (United States) Fontana | (Canada) Alex Tagliani | (Italy) Max Papis | (Italy) Max Papis | (Brazil) Cristiano da Matta | Newman-Haas Racing | Report |

=== Final driver standings ===
| Pos | Driver | FUN (Mexico) | LBH (United States) | TMS (United States) | NAZ (United States) | MOT (Japan) | MIL (United States) | BEL (United States) | POR (United States) | CLE (United States) | TOR (Canada) | MIS (United States) | CMS (United States) | MOH (United States) | ROA (United States) | VAN (Canada) | LAU (Germany) | ROC (United Kingdom) | HOU (United States) | LAG (United States) | SUR (Australia) | CAL (United States) | Pts |
|---|---|---|---|---|---|---|---|---|---|---|---|---|---|---|---|---|---|---|---|---|---|---|---|
| 1 | (Brazil) Gil de Ferran | 2 | 3 | C | 23 | 13 | 7 | 6 | 13 | 4 | **14*** | 24 | 3 | **2** | 5 | 2 | **8** | 1* | **1*** | **3*** | 4 | 6 | 199 |
| 2 | (Sweden) Kenny Bräck^{1} | **5** | 25 | **C** | 2* | 1 | **1*** | 9 | 11 | 6 | 20 | **17** | 1 | 20 | **14** | 8 | 1* | **2** | 7 | 25 | 5 | 26 | 163 |
| 3 | (United States) Michael Andretti | 4 | 28 | C | 6 | 23 | 2 | 4 | 8 | 15 | 1 | 19 | 24 | 26 | 2 | 3 | 4 | 5 | 21 | 14 | 2 | 7 | 147 |
| 4 | (Brazil) Hélio Castroneves | 8 | **1*** | C | 11 | **2*** | 26 | **1*** | 17 | 12 | 19 | 8 | 7* | 1* | 7* | 18 | 12 | 4 | 5 | 6 | 20 | 22 | 141 |
| 5 | (Brazil) Cristiano da Matta | 1* | 2 | C | 10 | 25 | 25 | 7 | 10 | 7 | 15 | 4 | 19 | 10 | 6 | 20 | 26 | 3 | 6 | 20 | 1 | 1 | 140 |
| 6 | (Italy) Max Papis | 12 | 17 | C | 24 | 6 | 8 | 11 | **1*** | 18 | 8 | 16* | 13 | 24 | 16 | 22 | 2 | 11 | 9 | 1 | 9 | 2* | 107 |
| 7 | (United Kingdom) Dario Franchitti | 9 | 6 | C | 8 | 17 | 9 | 2 | 6 | 1 | 24 | 2 | 15 | 16 | 19 | 9 | 25 | 9 | 2 | 19 | 23 | 23 | 105 |
| 8 | (New Zealand) Scott Dixon RY | 13 | 19 | C | 1 | 9 | 3 | 22 | 7 | 20 | 5 | 10 | 4 | 12 | 4 | 13 | 9 | 22 | 18 | 4 | 15 | 17 | 98 |
| 9 | (Brazil) Tony Kanaan | 7 | 7 | C | 16 | 3 | 6 | DNS | 24 | 16 | 10 | 21 | **8** | 5 | 12 | 4 | 7 | 8 | 12 | 8 | 17 | 5 | 93 |
| 10 | (Canada) Patrick Carpentier | 25 | 23 | C | 25 | 19 | 17 | 8 | 5 | 26 | 21 | 1 | 2 | 3 | 9 | 16 | 3 | 16 | 10 | 26 | 11 | 10 | 91 |
| 11 | (Canada) Alex Tagliani | 21 | 18 | C | 22 | 22 | 12 | 21 | 12 | 9 | 2 | 6 | 6 | 7 | 8 | **23*** | 21 | 14 | 19 | 15 | 3 | **3** | 80 |
| 12 | (United States) Jimmy Vasser | 6 | 5 | C | 4 | 5 | 21 | 18 | 16 | 5 | 26 | 23 | 14 | 23 | 21 | 19 | 15 | 7 | 11 | 5 | 6 | 12 | 77 |
| 13 | (Brazil) Roberto Moreno | 27 | 11 | C | 12 | 10 | 15 | 3 | 2 | 8 | 11 | 12 | 20 | 6 | 11 | 1 | 23 | 13 | 22 | 22 | **22*** | 19 | 76 |
| 14 | (Canada) Paul Tracy | 3 | 4 | C | 3 | 18 | 24 | 14 | 21 | 24 | 6 | 7 | 12 | 4 | 26 | 26 | 10 | 6 | 24 | 18 | 14 | 24 | 73 |
| 15 | (Brazil) Christian Fittipaldi | 20 | 24 | C | 5 | 4 | 18 | 5 | 3 | 11 | 12 | 18 | 25 | 8 | 18 | 11 | 19 | 24 | 8 | 9 | 8 | 13 | 70 |
| 16 | (Brazil) Bruno Junqueira R | 22 | 9 | C | **7** | 24 | 4 | 19 | 23 | 23 | 13 | 9 | 17 | 13 | 1 | 12 | 11 | 25 | 23 | 7 | 21 | 4 | 68 |
| 17 | (United States) Memo Gidley | | | | | | | | 25 | 2* | 17 | 14 | 5 | 11 | 20 | 10 | 14 | 18 | 3 | 2 | 10 | 14 | 65 |
| 18 | (Mexico) Adrián Fernández | 19 | 16 | C | 19 | 16 | 5 | 12 | 19 | 21 | 3 | 25 | 10 | 22 | 3 | 21 | 24 | 23 | 14 | 10 | 19 | 18 | 45 |
| 19 | (Spain) Oriol Servià | 14 | 14 | C | 9 | 14 | 14 | 16 | 9 | 17 | 23 | 11 | 18 | 9 | 10 | 5 | 5 | 10 | 26 | 17 | 25 | 11 | 42 |
| 20 | (Mexico) Michel Jourdain Jr. | 17 | 13 | C | 13 | 11 | 13 | 25 | 15 | 25 | 16 | 3 | 23 | 17 | 17 | 6 | 17 | 19 | 25 | 23 | 7 | 16 | 30 |
| 21 | (Japan) Toranosuke Takagi R | 10 | 20 | C | 14 | 20 | DSQ | 20 | 18 | 14 | 22^{2} | 13 | 11 | 21 | 22 | 7 | 6 | 26 | 4 | 13 | 16 | 15 | 29 |
| 22 | (United States) Bryan Herta | 16 | 10 | C | 21 | 21 | 22 | 15 | 14 | 3 | 18 | 5 | 21 | 25 | 24 | 17 | 27 | 15 | 13 | 12 | 18 | 25 | 28 |
| 23 | (Italy) Alex Zanardi | 24 | 26 | C | 20 | 7 | 11 | 24 | 26 | 13 | 4 | 20 | 9 | 19 | 13 | 24 | 20^{3} | | | | | | 24 |
| 24 | (Brazil) Maurício Gugelmin | 15 | 22 | C | Wth | 12 | 10 | 10 | 20 | **10** | 7 | 15 | 22 | 14 | 23 | 15 | 16 | 20 | 20 | 16 | 24 | 20 | 17 |
| 25 | (Brazil) Max Wilson R | 28 | 21 | C | 17 | | 23 | 23 | 4 | 19 | 25 | Wth | | 15 | 25 | 25 | 18 | 21 | 16 | 24 | | | 12 |
| 26 | (Japan) Shinji Nakano | 18 | 12 | C | 15 | 8 | 16 | 13 | 22 | 22 | 9 | 22 | 16 | 18 | 15 | 14 | 22 | 17 | 15 | 21 | 12 | 21 | 11 |
| 27 | (France) Nicolas Minassian R | 11 | 8 | C | 18 | 15 | 19 | 17 | | | | | | | | | | | | | | | 7 |
| 28 | (United States) Casey Mears R | | | | | | | | | | | | | | | | | | 17 | 11 | 26 | 8 | 7 |
| 29 | (United States) Alex Barron | | | | | | | | | | | | | | | | | | | | 13 | 9 | 4 |
| 30 | (United States) Townsend Bell R | | | | | | | | | | | | | | | | 13 | 12 | | | | | 1 |
| 31 | (Germany) Michael Krumm R | 23 | 15 | | | | | | | | | | | | | | | | | | | | 0 |
| 32 | (Brazil) Luiz Garcia Jr. | 26 | 27 | | | | | | | | | | | | | | | | | | | | 0 |
| Pos | Driver | FUN (Mexico) | LBH (United States) | TMS (United States) | NAZ (United States) | MOT (Japan) | MIL (United States) | BEL (United States) | POR (United States) | CLE (United States) | TOR (Canada) | MIS (United States) | CMS (United States) | MOH (United States) | ROA (United States) | VAN (Canada) | LAU (Germany) | ROC (United Kingdom) | HOU (United States) | LAG (United States) | SUR (Australia) | CAL (United States) | Pts |

| Color | Result |
|---|---|
| Gold | Winner |
| Silver | 2nd place |
| Bronze | 3rd place |
| Green | 4th–6th place |
| Light Blue | 7th–12th place |
| Dark Blue | Finished (Outside Top 12) |
| Purple | Did not finish |
| Red | Did not qualify (DNQ) |
| Brown | Withdrawn (Wth) |
| Black | Disqualified (DSQ) |
| White | Did not start (DNS) |
| Blank | Did not participate (DNP) |
| Blank | Not competing |

**In-line notation**
| **Bold** | Pole position |
| Italics | Ran fastest race lap |
| * | Led most race laps |
| RY | Rookie of the Year |
| R | Rookie |

1. Kenny Bräck also awarded 1 point for his pole position in Fort Worth. The race was canceled after qualifying due to excessively high speeds.
2. Toranosuke Takagi was penalized 2 points for rough driving in Toronto.
3. Alex Zanardi's car was impacted from the side by Alex Tagliani's car at EuroSpeedway Lausitz. He lost both of his lower legs in the impact. This signaled the end of his open-wheel racing career.

=== Nations' Cup ===
- Top result per race counts towards Nations' Cup.

| Pos | Country | FUN (Mexico) | LBH (United States) | NAZ (United States) | MOT (Japan) | MIL (United States) | BEL (United States) | POR (United States) | CLE (United States) | TOR (Canada) | MIS (United States) | CMS (United States) | MOH (United States) | ROA (United States) | VAN (Canada) | LAU (Germany) | ROC (United Kingdom) | HOU (United States) | LAG (United States) | SUR (Australia) | CAL (United States) | Pts |
|---|---|---|---|---|---|---|---|---|---|---|---|---|---|---|---|---|---|---|---|---|---|---|
| 1 | Brazil | 1 | 1 | 5 | 2 | 4 | 1 | 2 | 4 | 7 | 5 | 3 | 1 | 1 | 1 | 7 | 1 | 1 | 3 | 1 | 1 | 341 |
| 2 | United States | 4 | 5 | 4 | 5 | 2 | 4 | 8 | 2 | 1 | 4 | 5 | 11 | 2 | 3 | 4 | 5 | 3 | 2 | 2 | 7 | 240 |
| 3 | Canada | 3 | 4 | 3 | 18 | 12 | 8 | 5 | 9 | 2 | 1 | 2 | 3 | 8 | 16 | 3 | 6 | 10 | 15 | 3 | 3 | 187 |
| 4 | Sweden | 5 | 25 | 2 | 1 | 1 | 9 | 11 | 6 | 20 | 17 | 1 | 20 | 14 | 8 | 1 | 2 | 7 | 25 | 5 | 26 | 163 |
| 5 | Italy | 12 | 17 | 20 | 6 | 8 | 11 | 1 | 18 | 4 | 16 | 9 | 19 | 13 | 22 | 2 | 11 | 9 | 1 | 9 | 2 | 118 |
| 6 | United Kingdom | 9 | 6 | 8 | 17 | 9 | 2 | 6 | 1 | 24 | 2 | 15 | 16 | 19 | 9 | 25 | 9 | 2 | 19 | 23 | 23 | 105 |
| 7 | New Zealand | 13 | 19 | 1 | 9 | 3 | 22 | 7 | 20 | 5 | 10 | 4 | 12 | 4 | 13 | 9 | 22 | 18 | 4 | 15 | 17 | 98 |
| 8 | Mexico | 17 | 13 | 9 | 11 | 5 | 12 | 15 | 21 | 3 | 3 | 10 | 17 | 3 | 6 | 17 | 19 | 14 | 10 | 7 | 16 | 75 |
| 9 | Japan | 10 | 12 | 14 | 8 | 16 | 13 | 18 | 14 | 9 | 13 | 11 | 18 | 15 | 7 | 6 | 17 | 4 | 13 | 12 | 15 | 42 |
| 10 | Spain | 14 | 14 | 9 | 14 | 14 | 16 | 9 | 17 | 23 | 11 | 18 | 9 | 10 | 5 | 5 | 10 | 26 | 17 | 25 | 11 | 42 |
| 11 | France | 11 | 8 | 18 | 15 | 19 | 17 | | | | | | | | | | | | | | | 7 |
| 12 | Germany | 23 | 15 | | | | | | | | | | | | | | | | | | | 0 |
| Pos | Country | FUN (Mexico) | LBH (United States) | NAZ (United States) | MOT (Japan) | MIL (United States) | BEL (United States) | POR (United States) | CLE (United States) | TOR (Canada) | MIS (United States) | CMS (United States) | MOH (United States) | ROA (United States) | VAN (Canada) | LAU (Germany) | ROC (United Kingdom) | HOU (United States) | LAG (United States) | SUR (Australia) | CAL (United States) | Pts |

=== Chassis Constructors' Cup ===
| Pos | Chassis | Pts |
|---|---|---|
| 1 | (United Kingdom) Reynard 01i | 378 |
| 2 | (United Kingdom) Lola B1/00 & B2K/00 | 335 |
| Pos | Chassis | Pts |

=== Engine Manufacturers' Cup ===
| Pos | Engine | Pts |
|---|---|---|
| 1 | (Japan) Honda | 342 |
| 2 | (Japan) Toyota | 309 |
| 3 | (United States) (United Kingdom) Ford-Cosworth | 297 |
| 4 | (United States) Ilmor | 0 |
| Pos | Engine | Pts |

== Bibliography ==
- Shaw, Jeremy, ed. (2002). Autocourse Cart: Official Champ Car Yearbook 2001-2002. Richmond, Surrey: Hazleton Publishing. ISBN 978-1-903135-12-9.

== See also ==
- 2001 Toyota Atlantic Championship season
- 2001 Indianapolis 500
- 2001 Indy Racing League
- 2001 Indy Lights season
