= 2001 Honda Grand Prix of Monterey =

Coordinates: 36°35′03″N 121°45′13″W

(United States) 2001 Grand Prix of Monterey
Race details
- Race 19 of 21 in the 2001 CART season
- Map of the track
- Date: October 14, 2001
- Official name: Honda Grand Prix of Monterey
- Location: Mazda Raceway Laguna Seca, California, United States
- Course: Permanent racing facility 2.238 mi / 3.602 km
- Distance: 76 laps 170.088 mi / 273.730 km
- Scheduled Distance: 83 laps 185.754 mi / 298.942 km

Pole position
- Driver: (Brazil) Gil de Ferran (Penske Racing)
- Time: 1:08.596

Fastest lap
- Driver: (Brazil) Hélio Castroneves (Penske Racing)
- Time: 1:11.500 (on lap 47 of 76)

Podium
- First: (Italy) Max Papis (Team Rahal)
- Second: (United States) Memo Gidley (Chip Ganassi Racing)
- Third: (Brazil) Gil de Ferran (Penske Racing)

The 2001 Honda Grand Prix of Monterey was a CART motor race held on October 14, 2001 at the Mazda Raceway Laguna Seca in California, United States. It was the 19th round of the 2001 CART season.

== Background ==
In the lead-up to this event, Honda would announce that they would withdraw from CART at the conclusion of the 2002 season, in a direct response to both the Pop-Off Valve controversy in the first half of the year and the Naturally Aspirated 3.5L Engine announcement for 2003. Members of Honda Performance Development would outright admit that they felt the situation in CART was no longer good for engine manufacturers. Rumors would also abound that Ford might do the same.

== Qualifying ==
Brazilian driver Gil de Ferran set the pole, fellow Brazilian and his teammate Hélio Castroneves, from Penske Racing, started alongside him at the first row. De Ferran earned one championship point for securing pole position.

== Race summary ==
Straight off the start, Michael Andretti tangled with championship leader Kenny Brack through turn 1, causing the American driver to spin off course and stall, eventually rejoining a lap down on the leaders. Brack survived this incident, but later in the lap Maurício Gugelmin dove inside the Swede at turn 5, striking his front left wheel and breaking the suspension. Despite frantic repairs, Kenny would lose five laps and eventually retire the car.

The first caution came out on lap 2 as the Forsythe Racing drivers Alex Tagliani and Patrick Carpentier collided with each other in turn 10, with the latter retiring. Gil de Ferran led Helio Castroneves, Scott Dixon, Tony Kanaan, and Paul Tracy.

Then, at lap seven, the Chip Ganassi Racing pit was on fire. Two mechanics suffered slight burns, but they continued in the race. The restart came at lap eight. The 2nd caution happened at lap 11, as the American Forsythe Racing driver Bryan Herta spun his countryman Casey Mears from Mo Nunn Racing. The Brazilian driver Max Wilson from Arciero Racing was also involved. Wilson retired.

The restart came out at lap 15. The third caution happened at lap 18, as the Brazilian Roberto Moreno, from Patrick Racing, had hit the wall. Then, the Bettenhausen Racing driver Michel Jourdain Jr., from Mexico, also hit the wall. Both retired.

The restart came out at lap 24. Then, the former Formula One Japanese driver Shinji Nakano, from Fernández Racing retired due to mechanical problems, at lap 43. The fourth caution was out.

After 43 laps, this was the top six: Castroneves, Dixon, de Ferran, Tora Takagi, Christian Fittipaldi and Tracy. After 44 laps, de Ferran led most laps at that time: 36. The restart came out at lap 46. Two laps later, Tagliani overtook the Scottish driver Dario Franchitti, from Team Green at The Corkscrew. Tagliani pushed Franchitti too much in the gravel, but Franchitti was still in the race.

At lap 49, Chip Ganassi Racing driver Memo Gidley, from United States hit Michael Andretti, causing a fifth caution. The top six after some pit stops were Adrian Fernandez, Max Papis, Memo Gidley—these drivers did not make their pit stops—and de Ferran, Dixon and Jimmy Vasser.

During the pit exit, Castroneves hit Paul Tracy. The Canadian spun. The restart came out at lap 53. At this lap, Franchitti hit the Brazilian Newman-Haas Racing driver Cristiano da Matta at Turn two. sixth caution. Da Matta retired. Paul Tracy went to the pits just to do a burnout in Castroneves' pit.

The restart came out at lap 57. At lap 62, Fernandez pitted and lost his lead to Max Papis. Then, the seventh caution happened, as Dario Franchitti suffered brake problems and hit the wall. At the same moment, Paul Tracy had a suspension problem, due to the incident with Castroneves at the pits.

The restart came out at lap 65. At lap 66, Sigma Autosport Spaniard Oriol Servià went airborne, after hit Maurício Gugelmin from behind. Both drivers retired. Servia's car did a frontflip. Servià suffered slight neck pains, but he was ok. The restart came out at lap 68 with 5:50 minutes to go. Max Papis won the race. It was the third and final win in CART for the Italian. It was the sixth Team Rahal win in that season. Memo Gidley finished second, with Gil de Ferran third.

== Race results ==
Finish	Grid	Car no.	Driver	Chassis	Engine	Laps	Status	Laps Led	Points
1	25	7	(Italy) Max Papis	Lola B01/00	Toyota RV8E	76	2:00:10	16	20
2	23	12	(United States) Memo Gidley	Lola B01/00	Toyota RV8E	76	Flagged		16
3	1	1	(Brazil) Gil de Ferran	Reynard 01i	Honda HR-1	76	Flagged	36	16*
4	3	18	(New Zealand) Scott Dixon R	Reynard 01i	Toyota RV8E	76	Flagged	2	12
5	11	40	(United States) Jimmy Vasser	Reynard 01i	Toyota RV8E	76	Flagged		10
6	2	3	(Brazil) Hélio Castroneves	Reynard 01i	Honda HR-1	76	Flagged	11	8
7	12	4	(Brazil) Bruno Junqueira R	Lola B01/00	Toyota RV8E	76	Flagged		6
8	6	55	(Brazil) Tony Kanaan	Reynard 01i	Honda HR-1	76	Flagged		5
9	19	11	(Brazil) Christian Fittipaldi	Lola B01/00	Toyota RV8E	76	Flagged		4
10	17	51	(Mexico) Adrian Fernández	Reynard 01i	Honda HR-1	76	Flagged	11	3
11	18	66	(United States) Casey Mears	Reynard 01i	Honda HR-1	76	Flagged		2
12	26	77	(United States) Bryan Herta	Reynard 01i	Ford-Cosworth XF	76	Flagged		1
13	10	5	(Japan) Tora Takagi R	Reynard 01i	Toyota RV8E	76	Flagged		
14	16	39	(United States) Michael Andretti	Reynard 01i	Honda HR-1	75	Flagged		
15	8	33	(Canada) Alex Tagliani	Reynard 01i	Ford-Cosworth XF	74	Flagged		
16	13	17	(Brazil) Maurício Gugelmin	Reynard 01i	Toyota RV8E	65	Crash		
17	21	22	(Spain) Oriol Servià			65	Crash		
18	5	26	(Canada) Paul Tracy			60	Suspension		
19	22	27	(Scotland) Dario Franchitti			59	Crash		
20	7	6	(Brazil) Cristiano da Matta			52	Crash		
21	20	52	(Japan) Shinji Nakano			41	Electrical		
22	4	20	(Brazil) Roberto Moreno			17	Crash		
23	15	16	(Mexico) Michel Jourdain Jr.			17	Crash		
24	24	25	(Brazil) Max Wilson R			9	Crash		
25	14	8	(Sweden) Kenny Bräck			6	Suspension		
26	9	32	(Canada) Patrick Carpentier			1	Crash		

Race Shortened due to two hour time limit
* = Indicates 1 bonus point for pole and 1 bonus point for most laps lead
Average speed: 84.919 mph
Cautions: 8 for 29 laps
Margin of victory: .794 sec
Lead changes: 4

Previous race: 2001 Texaco/Havoline Grand Prix of Houston	CART FedEx Championship Series; 2001 season	Next race: 2001 Honda Indy 300
Previous race: 2000 Honda Grand Prix of Monterey	Honda Grand Prix of Monterey	Next race: 2002 Bridgestone Grand Prix of Monterey
