= Lola B02/00 =

Racing car designed and built by Lola Cars

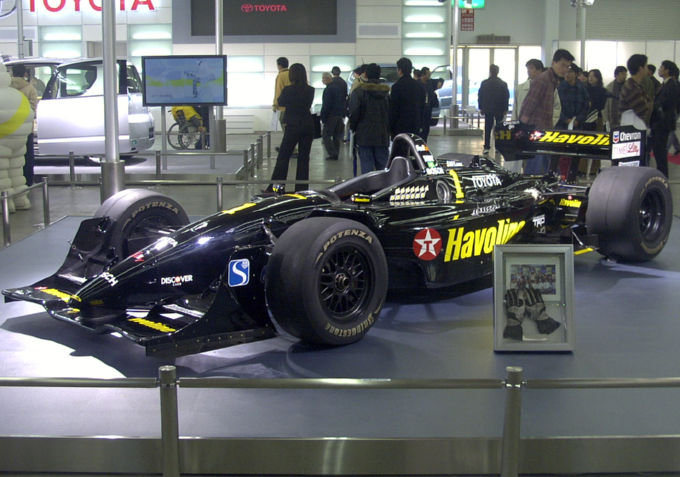
- Category: CART IndyCar
- Constructor: Lola
- Predecessor: Lola B01/00
- Successor: None

Technical specifications
- Length: 4,978 mm (196 in)
- Width: 2,032 mm (80 in)
- Height: 940 mm (37 in)
- Axle track: 1,753 mm (69 in) (Front); 1,638 mm (64 in) (Rear)
- Wheelbase: 3,048 mm (120 in)
- Engine: Honda Indy V8 turbo (2002 only); Toyota RV8G (2002 only); Ford/Cosworth XD/XF/XF-E (2002–2006) 2.65 L (2,650 cc; 162 cu in) V8 mid-engined
- Transmission: 6-speed sequential manual
- Weight: 1,550 lb (700 kg)
- Fuel: Methanol
- Tyres: Bridgestone

Competition history
- Debut: 2002 Tecate/Telmex Monterrey Grand Prix; Monterrey, Mexico
Races	Wins
78	73
- Teams' Championships: 4
- Constructors' Championships: 4
- Drivers' Championships: 4

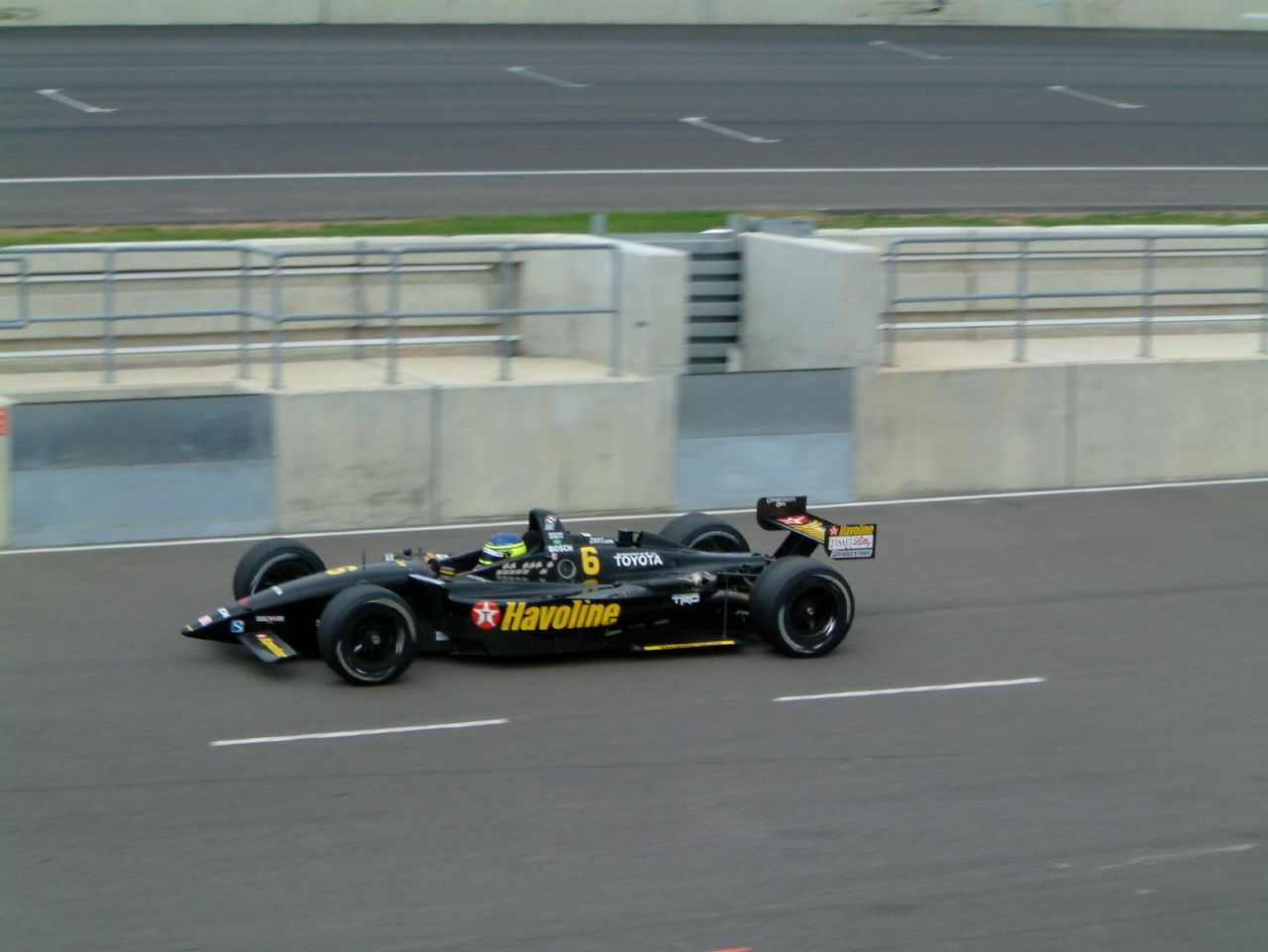
Lola B02/00 chassis practicing for the 2002 Sure for Men Rockingham 500

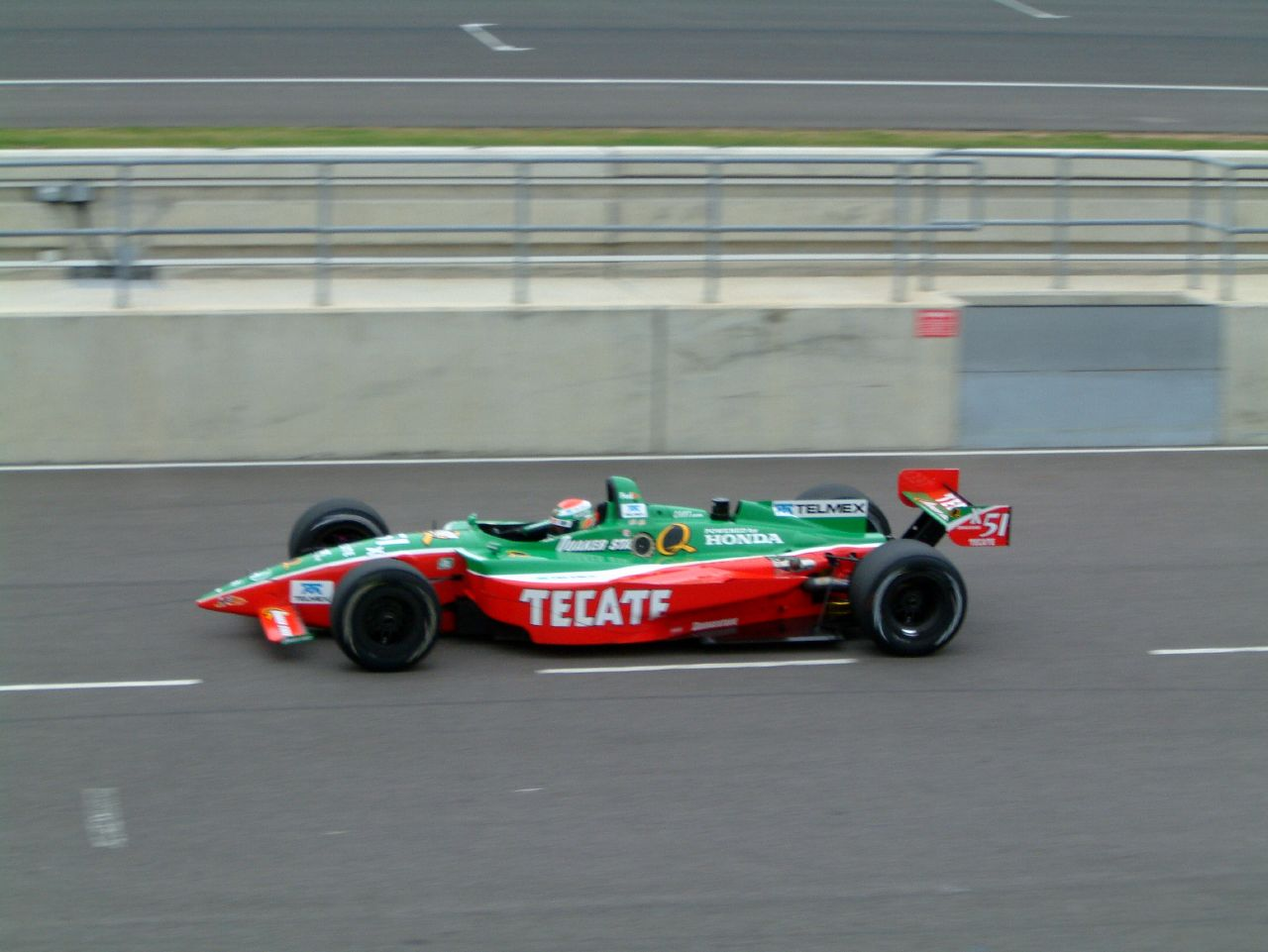
Adrian Fernández's 2002 Lola chassis

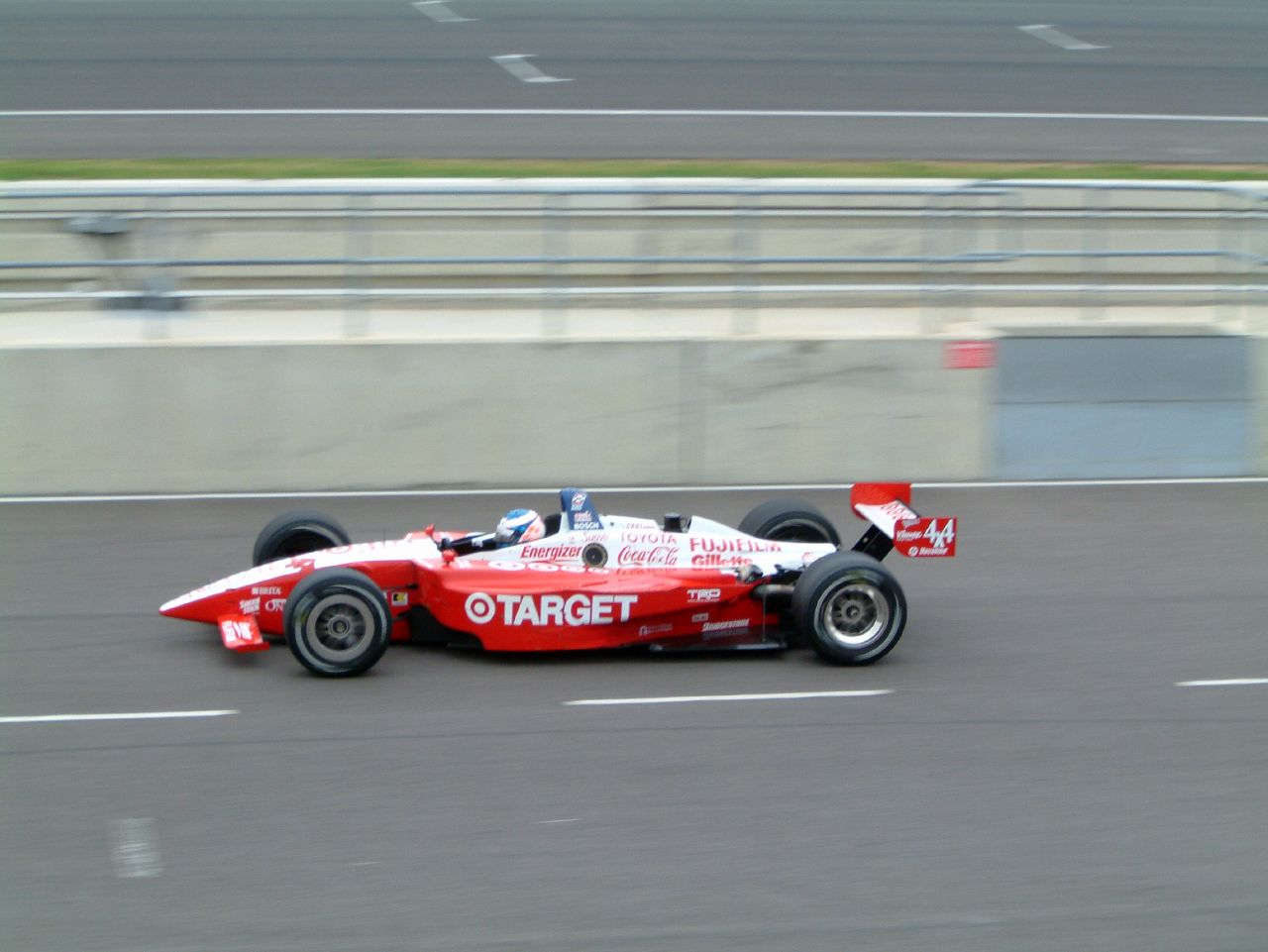
Scott Dixon's 2002 Lola Chassis

The Lola B02/00 is an open-wheel racing car chassis designed and built by Lola that competed in the CART (and later Champ Car) series, between 2002 and 2006. It was extremely competitive and incredibly dominant chassis; going on to win 4 constructors' titles, 4 drivers' titles, and claiming a total of 73 race wins over four seasons. It was eventually succeeded by the Panoz DP01 chassis in 2007.
