= 2001 Texaco/Havoline Grand Prix of Houston =

Coordinates: 29°45′8″N 95°21′28″W

(United States) 2001 Texaco/Havoline Grand Prix of Houston
Race details
- Race 18 of 21 in the 2001 CART season
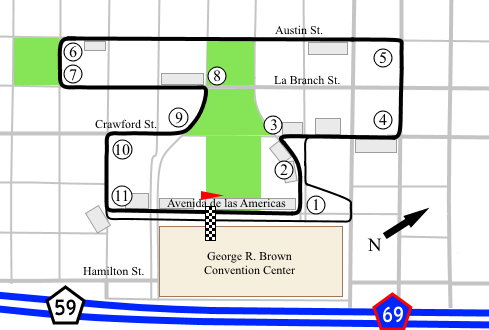
- Track layout.
- Date: October 7, 2001
- Official name: 2001 Texaco/Havoline Grand Prix of Houston
- Location: George R. Brown Convention Center, Houston, Texas, United States
- Course: Temporary street course 1.527 mi / 2.457 km
- Distance: 100 laps 152.7 mi / 245.7 km

Pole position
- Driver: (Brazil) (Brazil) Gil de Ferran (Team Penske)
- Time: 59.421

Fastest lap
- Driver: (United States) (United States) Jimmy Vasser (Patrick Racing)
- Time: 1:00.928 (on lap 75 of 100)

Podium
- First: (Brazil) (Brazil) Gil de Ferran (Team Penske)
- Second: (Scotland) (Scotland) Dario Franchitti (Team Green)
- Third: (United States) (United States) Memo Gidley (Chip Ganassi Racing)

The 2001 Texaco/Havoline Grand Prix of Houston was a Championship Auto Racing Teams (CART) motor race held on October 7, 2001 on the streets of Houston, Texas, USA. It was the 18th round of the 2001 CART FedEx Championship Series season. Gil de Ferran took his second win of the season for Team Penske after starting on pole position and leading every lap ahead of Dario Franchitti and Memo Gidley.

de Ferran inherited the lead of the drivers' standings from Kenny Bräck by virtue of his win here and at the previous race at Rockingham, a lead he would not relinquish for the rest of the season. The difficult road course on the streets of Houston meant that little on-track passing could occur, and de Ferran's position throughout the race was rarely in jeopardy. Franchitti was one of the few that could muscle his way through the field despite being hit by Hélio Castroneves at the start of the race, taking his third podium finish at Houston in four starts and his third podium of the season. Gidley, after starting 23rd, used pit strategy to move his way through the field and take his second podium of the season and his career.

The race saw multiple incidents and crashes as drivers struggled around the temporary circuit. Alex Tagliani, despite running near the front for the entire race, crashed from 2nd place with just seven laps remaining. Oriol Servià and Michel Jourdain Jr. also crashed on Lap 37, with Servià's car ending up on top of Jourdain's.

This was the final time CART would race at this track configuration in Houston; the series would return in 2006 and 2007 using a temporary circuit at NRG Park, while the IndyCar Series would race in Houston from 2013-2014.

== Qualifying ==
October 6, 2001 - Qualifying Speeds
Rank	Driver	Time	Leader	Speed (mph)	Team
1	(Brazil) Gil de Ferran	59.421	—	92.513	Team Penske
2	(Brazil) Bruno Junqueira (R)	59.943	+0.522	91.707	Chip Ganassi Racing
3	(Sweden) Kenny Bräck	59.947	+0.526	91.701	Team Rahal
4	(Brazil) Hélio Castroneves	1:00.063	+0.642	91.524	Team Penske
5	(Canada) Alex Tagliani	1:00.191	+0.770	91.329	Forsythe Racing
6	(Scotland) Dario Franchitti	1:00.433	+1.012	90.964	Team Green
7	(New Zealand) Scott Dixon (R)	1:00.446	+1.025	90.944	PacWest Racing
8	(Brazil) Cristiano da Matta	1:00.491	+1.070	90.876	Newman-Haas Racing
9	(Brazil) Maurício Gugelmin	1:00.502	+1.081	90.860	PacWest Racing
10	(Brazil) Tony Kanaan	1:00.548	+1.127	90.791	Mo Nunn Racing
11	(Brazil) Roberto Moreno	1:00.612	+1.191	90.695	Patrick Racing
12	(United States) Michael Andretti	1:00.625	+1.204	90.675	Team Motorola
13	(Brazil) Christian Fittipaldi	1:00.681	+1.260	90.592	Newman-Haas Racing
14	(Japan) Tora Takagi (R)	1:00.793	+1.291	90.425	Walker Motorsport
15	(Mexico) Adrian Fernández	1:00.861	+1.440	90.324	Fernandez Racing
16	(Japan) Shinji Nakano	1:00.949	+1.528	90.193	Fernandez Racing
17	(Spain) Oriol Servià	1:01.182	+1.761	89.850	Sigma Autosport
18	(Mexico) Michel Jourdain Jr.	1:01.192	+1.771	89.835	Bettenhausen Racing
19	(Italy) Max Papis	1:01.289	+1.868	89.693	Team Rahal
20	(Canada) Patrick Carpentier	1:01.310	+1.889	89.662	Forsythe Racing
21	(Canada) Paul Tracy	1:01.382	+1.961	89.557	Team Green
22	(United States) Bryan Herta	1:01.418	+1.997	89.505	Forsythe Racing
23	(United States) Memo Gidley	1:01.611	+2.190	89.224	Chip Ganassi Racing
24	(United States) Jimmy Vasser	1:02.129	+2.708	88.840	Patrick Racing
25	(United States) Casey Mears	1:02.799	+3.376	87.536	Mo Nunn Racing
26	(Brazil) Max Wilson (R)	1:02.912	+3.491	87.379	Arciero Racing

== Race ==
Pos	No	Driver	Team	Laps	Time/retired	Grid	Points
1	1	(Brazil) Gil de Ferran	Team Penske	100	1:54:42.336	1	22^{1}
2	27	(Scotland) Dario Franchitti	Team Green	100	+3.430	6	16
3	12	(United States) Memo Gidley	Chip Ganassi Racing	100	+18.847	23	14
4	5	(Japan) Tora Takagi (R)	Walker Motorsport	100	+20.894	14	12
5	3	(Brazil) Hélio Castroneves	Team Penske	100	+21.670	4	10
6	6	(Brazil) Cristiano da Matta	Newman-Haas Racing	100	+23.102	8	8
7	8	(Sweden) Kenny Bräck	Team Rahal	100	+28.826	3	6
8	11	(Brazil) Christian Fittipaldi	Newman-Haas Racing	100	+34.421	13	5
9	7	(Italy) Max Papis	Team Rahal	100	+38.298	19	4
10	32	(Canada) Patrick Carpentier	Forsythe Racing	100	+38.883	20	3
11	40	(United States) Jimmy Vasser	Patrick Racing	100	+39.251	24	2
12	55	(Brazil) Tony Kanaan	Mo Nunn Racing	100	+46.539	10	1
13	77	(United States) Bryan Herta	Forsythe Racing	100	+46.800	22	—
14	51	(Mexico) Adrian Fernández	Fernandez Racing	99	+1 Lap	15	—
15	52	(Japan) Shinji Nakano	Fernandez Racing	99	+1 Lap	16	—
16	25	(Brazil) Max Wilson (R)	Arciero Racing	98	+2 Laps	26	—
17	66	(United States) Casey Mears	Mo Nunn Racing	98	+2 Laps	25	—
18	18	(New Zealand) Scott Dixon (R)	PacWest Racing	96	Contact	7	—
19	33	(Canada) Alex Tagliani	Forsythe Racing	93	Contact	5	—
20	17	(Brazil) Maurício Gugelmin	PacWest Racing	78	Gearbox	9	—
21	39	(United States) Michael Andretti	Team Motorola	76	Brakes	12	—
22	20	(Brazil) Roberto Moreno	Patrick Racing	65	Gearbox	11	—
23	4	(Brazil) Bruno Junqueira (R)	Chip Ganassi Racing	52	Contact	2	—
24	26	(Canada) Paul Tracy	Team Green	49	Contact	21	—
25	16	(Mexico) Michel Jourdain Jr.	Bettenhausen Racing	37	Contact	18	—
26	22	(Spain) Oriol Servià	Sigma Autosport	37	Contact	17	—

- ^{1}– Includes two bonus points for leading the most laps and being the fastest qualifier.

== Race statistics ==
- Lead changes: 0 among 0 drivers

Lap Leaders
Laps	Leader
1–100	Gil de Ferran

Total laps led
Leader	Laps
Gil de Ferran	100

Cautions: 4 for 16 laps
Laps	Reason
39-43	Servià and Jourdain Jr. crash
45-47	Fernández and Nakano collide
52-54	Debris
79-83	Andretti stops on course

== Standings after the race ==
Drivers' standings

Pos	+/-	Driver	Points
1	1	(Brazil) Gil de Ferran	163
2	1	(Sweden) Kenny Bräck	153
3	1	(Brazil) Hélio Castroneves	133
4	1	(United States) Michael Andretti	125
5	1	(Scotland) Dario Franchitti	105

Constructors' standings

Pos	+/–	Constructor	Points
1		(United Kingdom) Reynard	329
2		(United Kingdom) Lola	274

Manufacturer's Standings

Pos	+/-	Manufacturer	Points
1		(Japan) Honda	300
2	1	(Japan) Toyota	250
3	1	(United Kingdom) Ford Cosworth	246

Previous race: 2001 Rockingham 500	CART FedEx Championship Series; 2001 season	Next race: 2001 Honda Grand Prix of Monterey
Previous race: 2000 Texaco/Havoline Grand Prix of Houston	Texaco/Havoline Grand Prix of Houston	Next race: Not held
