= 2001 Freightliner/G.I. Joe's 200 =

Coordinates: 45°35′49″N 122°41′45″W

(United States) 2001 G.I. Joe's 200
Race details
- Race 8 of 21 in the 2001 CART season
- Map of the track
- Date: June 24, 2001
- Official name: Freightliner/G.I. Joe's 200 Presented By Texaco
- Location: Portland International Raceway, Portland, USA
- Course: Permanent Road Course; 1.967 mi / 3.17 km
- Distance: 76 laps 149.492 mi / 240.92 km

Pole position
- Driver: (Italy) (Italy) Max Papis (Team Rahal)
- Time: 57.785

Fastest lap
- Driver: (Italy) (Italy) Max Papis (Team Rahal)
- Time: 1:12.611 (on lap 74 of 76)

Podium
- First: (Italy) (Italy) Max Papis (Team Rahal)
- Second: (Brazil) (Brazil) Roberto Moreno (Patrick Racing)
- Third: (Brazil) (Brazil) Christian Fittipaldi (Newman-Haas Racing)

The 2001 Freightliner/G.I. Joe's 200 Presented By Texaco was a Championship Auto Racing Teams (CART) motor race held on June 24, 2001, at Portland International Raceway in Portland, Oregon, USA. It was the 8th round of the 2001 CART season. The race was won from the pole in severe wet conditions by Max Papis for Team Rahal. Roberto Moreno finished second, and Christian Fittipaldi clinched third.

It was Papis' second career CART win and his first of the 2001 season. It was also his second career pole in the series, as well as his last. For Moreno, it was his second consecutive runner-up at Portland and his second consecutive podium that season after finishing third at Detroit. It would also be Fittipaldi's only podium finish that season.

The race was marred by heavy rain the night before the race, which created a wet track with multiple areas of standing water. This proved to be a challenge to many drivers, with the majority of them spinning at least once during the race, resulting in multiple caution periods in the first half of the race. Originally scheduled for 98 laps, the race reached the two-hour time limit after 76 laps.

== Report ==
=== Background ===
Coming into Portland after a dominant race in Detroit, Team Penske was the favorite to control Round 8 of the 2001 season. In particular, Gil de Ferran, defending series champion and two-time defending Portland winner, was tipped to be a strong contender and perhaps even take his first win of the season. His teammate Hélio Castroneves on the other hand, having climbed the fence in Detroit after his latest victory, was also considered to be in the hunt for the win.

Going into the race, Castroneves had closed the gap to points leader Kenny Bräck in the standings, and the margin between first and second was only five points. Meanwhile, Michael Andretti had put together a streak of top-six finishes in the last four races to put himself in third in the standings. Defending champion de Ferran was sitting in a cool fifth place in the standings. Meanwhile, "Super Sub" Memo Gidley was called up to replace Nicolas Minassian in the Chip Ganassi #12 car for the rest of the season after Minassian was released by the team. Gidley had previously raced for both Forsythe Racing and Della Penna Motorsports during the 2000 CART season.

=== Practice and Qualifying ===
Practice 1 saw Kenny Bräck top the time sheets with a 58.606. Castroneves and Cristiano da Matta were the only other two drivers that session that broke into the fifty-eight second range. Other drivers, including Bräck, also used the first session to record times in their backup cars; notably, Bräck was five seconds off his session time in the backup car, whereas Alex Zanardi was able to improve his time in his backup car.

Castroneves improved on his time in previous session and led the field in Practice 2 with a time of 58.318, followed by fellow Brazilians Christian Fittipaldi and Maurício Gugelmin. This time, a total of ten drivers were able to break into the fifty-eight second range.

In the third practice session, Castroneves again led the rest of the drivers and improved his time to record a lap of 58.073, with Max Papis and da Matta closely behind. At the end of the day, the field was relatively bunched together, as nineteen drivers were able to break into the fifty-eight second range.

In qualifying, Castroneves could not convert his practice pace into a pole-winning lap, and instead Papis recorded a time of 57.785 to earn his second and final pole position in his CART career. Da Matta slotted into second behind him, with Castroneves having to settle for third. Notably, rookie Scott Dixon was able to put his backup car in fourth place despite only running mid-field in each practice session. Dario Franchitti rounded out the top 5. Defending race winner de Ferran could only muster 15th place, less than a second behind the leader.

On the other hand, qualifying proved to be a disaster for points leader Kenny Bräck, as an exhaust system failure ignited his car and brought out the red flag to stop the session. As a result, he was given an eight-minute penalty by CART officials and could only run four laps in the backup car. When qualifying ended, Bräck only qualified 22nd out of 26 while his teammate took the pole.

=== Race ===
On raceday, rain had soaked the track for the first time since the CART teams arrived in Portland, meaning that drivers and teams alike could not rely on their practice and qualifying setups during the race itself. To make matters more difficult, the rain had continued as a light drizzle all throughout the morning warm-up and heading into the race, and CART officials decided that it was light enough to continue with the event. Portland International Raceway was already notorious for its first-turn chicane and difficulty to overtake; now drivers had to contend with a wet racetrack that nobody had practiced on all weekend.

On the pace lap, de Ferran became the first of what would ultimately be many drivers to spin off-course during the race. Going through Turn 7, de Ferran lost traction and slid into the grass, damaging his front wing and forcing him to make a pit stop.

When the green flag waved, the field was engulfed in a cloud of spray as the cars accelerated to race speed. Going into the first turn, the cars of Michael Andretti and Kenny Bräck were spun around, but they continued with no damage. Meanwhile, as the field sped down the back straightaway, Tony Kanaan went off-course at Turn 8. As he rejoined the track, he veered into the path of Memo Gidley, clipping his right rear tire and spinning him into the path of Alex Zanardi, who passing was Kanaan on the left. Zanardi and Gidley careened into the barriers, but both drivers walked away unharmed. Kanaan, meanwhile, had suffered major suspension damage, but he was able to limp back to the pits and officially retire the car.

Under the caution flag, going into Turn 7, Helio Castroneves slid off the track and nudged into the tire barriers. He was eventually restarted, but the incident put him a lap down. When the race restarted on Lap 6, the field circulated through Turn 1 cleanly with the exception of Tora Takagi and Shinji Nakano, who both spun and stalled their cars on the track. The yellow flag waved once again as both cars were restarted. After a brief caution period, the field went back to green on Lap 8. Cristiano da Matta and Max Wilson both ran wide going into the first corner, forcing them to cut the chicane. Michael Andretti also spun in Turn 1, but kept the car running. Finally, the race was stopped again when Adrian Fernández spun out later on-course and stalled the car.

Under the third caution, da Matta had too much speed going into Turn 8 and bumped the back of Papis' car, spinning himself around and stalling the car. After three caution laps, the race was again restarted on Lap 13, only to be stopped again when Bryan Herta was spun out by Wilson and stalled the car. At the same time, Alex Tagliani ran off course and punctured his right rear tire but kept the car running. After a single caution lap, the field continued under the green flag. The 15th lap of the race was the first to be incident-free, and after four cautions twelve of the twenty-six starters had spun off-track. By this time, Paul Tracy had muscled his way from 13th to 2nd and was catching up to Papis in the lead. However, after only four laps, the caution came again when Takagi spun and stalled his car a second time.

Under this fifth caution, Tracy used the opportunity to psychologically intimidate Papis by pulling alongside and tailgating him for several laps. However, Papis was able to pull away when the green flag came out again on Lap 24, but the field again only made it through a few corners before Michel Jourdain Jr. spun off course coming out of Turn 1, forcing a sixth caution. When the green came out again after one lap, Andretti was given a drive-through penalty for passing under yellow. Again Papis pulled away from the field and mounted a sizeable gap between him and Tracy in 2nd.

After several laps of green-flag running, the caution flag waved again on Lap 33 when Adrian Fernández spun off-course. The field used this opportunity to make their one and only pit stop during the race, and Papis again capitalized by leaving the pits first. At the same time, however, Paul Tracy slammed into the side of Bruno Junqueira as he left his pit box, ending Junqueira's race and damaging Tracy's suspension. Roberto Moreno took advantage of the situation and jumped both Tracy and Franchitti in the pits. Christian Fittipaldi inherited the lead by virtue of not pitting under the caution, followed by da Matta, who was now on the same strategy, and Papis in third.

When the race restarted on Lap 36, Franchitti ran into the back of Bryan Herta and spun going into Turn 1, forcing Herta and Moreno to cut the chicane. However, as Franchitti continued the race remained under green. On the same lap, Bräck and de Ferran spun in separate corners, but both were able to continue. Just a few laps later, on Lap 40, Shinji Nakano spun once again, but this time he suffered suspension damage that ended his race and brought out another caution. Fittipaldi and da Matta used this time to pit, handing the lead back to Papis.

The green flag waved again on Lap 44, but once again both Tagliani and Jourdain Jr. spun at the same corner. As the race stayed green, Paul Tracy spun coming onto the back straightaway and clipped Maurício Gugelmin, ending both of their races and bringing out the caution for what would be the 9th and final time. After three laps of caution, the green waved again and Papis took off from the rest of the field. Moreno and Wilson diced for 2nd position over the course of several laps as the rain briefly stopped before picking up again. Meanwhile, Fittipaldi began to climb up the order after restarting in 7th place. As the stretch of green-flag racing continued, the drivers who pitted on Lap 33 were told to conserve fuel to make it to the end of the race. This played into Fittipaldi's hands, as he had pitted on Lap 40 and had more than enough fuel to last the race distance.

As the race continued, race control officially declared a timed race on Lap 68, meaning that the race would only go 76 of the designated 98 laps before two hours had elapsed. By this point Fittipaldi had passed Patrick Carpentier for 4th, and was beginning to go after Wilson for a spot on the podium. With just eight minutes to go in the race, Fittipaldi cruised past Wilson going into Turn 1 and began closing on the leaders. However, after 76 laps and two hours since the drop of the green flag, Papis and Moreno were able to hold him off and take the checkered flag.

== Qualifying ==
June 23, 2001 - Qualifying Speeds
Rank	Driver	Time	Leader	Speed (mph)	Team
1	(Italy) Max Papis	57.785	—	122.669	Team Rahal
2	(Brazil) Cristiano da Matta	57.866	+0.081	122.497	Newman-Haas Racing
3	(Brazil) Hélio Castroneves	57.944	+0.159	122.332	Team Penske
4	(New Zealand) Scott Dixon (R)	57.962	+0.177	122.294	PacWest Racing
5	(United Kingdom) Dario Franchitti	58.057	+0.272	122.094	Team Green
6	(Brazil) Bruno Junqueira (R)	58.061	+0.276	122.085	Chip Ganassi Racing
7	(Brazil) Christian Fittipaldi	58.112	+0.327	121.978	Newman-Haas Racing
8	(Brazil) Roberto Moreno	58.197	+0.412	121.800	Patrick Racing
9	(United States) Jimmy Vasser	58.221	+0.436	121.750	Patrick Racing
10	(Canada) Patrick Carpentier	58.231	+0.446	121.729	Forsythe Racing
11	(Brazil) Maurício Gugelmin	58.430	+0.645	121.314	PacWest Racing
12	(United States) Bryan Herta	58.432	+0.647	121.310	PacWest Racing
13	(Canada) Paul Tracy	58.443	+0.658	121.287	Team Green
14	(Spain) Oriol Servià	58.499	+0.714	121.171	Sigma Autosport
15	(Brazil) Gil de Ferran	58.534	+0.749	121.099	Team Penske
16	(United States) Michael Andretti	58.572	+0.787	121.020	Team Motorola
17	(Japan) Tora Takagi (R)	58.600	+0.815	120.962	Walker Racing
18	(Japan) Shinji Nakano	58.601	+0.816	120.960	Fernandez Racing
19	(Brazil) Max Wilson (R)	58.636	+0.851	120.888	Arciero Racing
20	(Canada) Alex Tagliani	58.662	+0.877	120.835	Forsythe Racing
21	(Brazil) Tony Kanaan	58.697	+0.912	120.763	Mo Nunn Racing
22	(Sweden) Kenny Bräck	58.759	+0.974	120.635	Team Rahal
23	(Mexico) Adrian Fernández	58.826	+1.041	120.498	Fernandez Racing
24	(Mexico) Michel Jourdain Jr.	58.938	+1.153	120.269	Bettenhausen Racing
25	(United States) Memo Gidley	59.073	+1.288	119.994	Chip Ganassi Racing
26	(Italy) Alex Zanardi	59.213	+1.428	119.710	Mo Nunn Racing

== Race ==
Pos	No	Driver	Team	Laps	Time/retired	Grid	Points
1	8	(Italy) Max Papis	Team Rahal	76	2:00:20.836	1	22^{1}
2	20	(Brazil) Roberto Moreno	Patrick Racing	76	1.472 secs	8	16
3	11	(Brazil) Christian Fittipaldi	Newman-Haas Racing	76	3.612 secs	7	14
4	25	(Brazil) Max Wilson (R)	Arciero Racing	76	11.476 secs	19	12
5	32	(Canada) Patrick Carpentier	Forsythe Racing	76	12.039 secs	10	10
6	27	(United Kingdom) Dario Franchitti	Team Green	76	12.571 secs	5	8
7	18	(New Zealand) Scott Dixon (R)	PacWest Racing	76	13.141 secs	4	6
8	39	(United States) Michael Andretti	Team Motorola	76	13.840 secs	16	5
9	22	(Spain) Oriol Servià	Sigma Autosport	76	19.176 secs	14	4
10	6	(Brazil) Cristiano da Matta	Newman-Haas Racing	76	19.618 secs	2	3
11	8	(Sweden) Kenny Bräck	Team Rahal	76	19.731 secs	22	2
12	33	(Canada) Alex Tagliani	Forsythe Racing	76	20.531 secs	20	1
13	1	(Brazil) Gil de Ferran	Team Penske	76	22.985 secs	15	—
14	77	(United States) Bryan Herta	Forsythe Racing	76	33.189 secs	12	—
15	16	(Mexico) Michel Jourdain Jr.	Bettenhausen Racing	76	36.710 secs	24	—
16	40	(United States) Jimmy Vasser	Patrick Racing	76	47.645 secs	9	—
17	3	(Brazil) Hélio Castroneves	Team Penske	75	1 Lap	3	—
18	5	(Japan) Tora Takagi (R)	Walker Racing	72	4 Laps	17	—
19	51	(Mexico) Adrian Fernández	Fernandez Racing	72	4 Laps	23	—
20	17	(Brazil) Maurício Gugelmin	PacWest Racing	43	Contact	11	—
21	26	(Canada) Paul Tracy	Team Green	42	Contact	13	—
22	52	(Japan) Shinji Nakano	Fernandez Racing	38	Contact	18	—
23	4	(Brazil) Bruno Junqueira (R)	Chip Ganassi Racing	34	Contact	6	—
24	55	(Brazil) Tony Kanaan	Mo Nunn Racing	1	Contact	21	—
25	12	(United States) Memo Gidley	Chip Ganassi Racing	0	Contact	25	—
26	66	(Italy) Alex Zanardi	Mo Nunn Racing	0	Contact	26	—

- ^{1}– Includes two bonus points for leading the most laps and being the fastest qualifier.

== Race statistics ==
- Lead changes: 2 amongst 2 drivers

Lap Leaders
Laps	Leader
1–33	Max Papis
34-40	Christian Fittipaldi
41-76	Max Papis

Total laps led
Laps	Leader
Max Papis	69
Christian Fittipaldi	7

Cautions: 9 for 25 laps
Laps	Reason
1-4	Tony Kanaan, Memo Gidley, & Alex Zanardi crashes
6-7	Tora Takagi & Shinji Nakano in separate spins
9-12	Adrian Fernandez & Cristiano da Matta in separate spins
14	Bryan Herta spins
20-22	Tora Takagi spins
24	Michel Jourdain Jr. spins
33-36	Adrian Fernandez spins
40-42	Shinji Nakano spins
45-47	Paul Tracy spins and collects Maurício Gugelmin

== Standings after the race ==
Drivers' standings

Pos	+/–	Driver	Points
1		(Sweden) Kenny Bräck	75
2		(Brazil) Hélio Castroneves	69
3		(United States) Michael Andretti	53
4		(Brazil) Cristiano da Matta	49
5	6	(Brazil) Christian Fittipaldi	46

Constructors' standings

Pos	+/–	Constructor	Points
1		(United Kingdom) Reynard	131
2		(United Kingdom) Lola	130

Manufacturer's Standings

Pos	+/-	Manufacturer	Points
1		(Japan) Honda	116
2		(Japan) Toyota	114
3		(United Kingdom) Ford-Cosworth	100
4		(United Kingdom) Phoenix	0

Previous race: 2001 Tenneco Automotive Grand Prix of Detroit	CART FedEx Championship Series; 2001 season	Next race: 2001 Marconi Grand Prix of Cleveland
Previous race: 2000 Freightliner/G.I. Joe's 200	Freightliner/G.I. Joe's 200	Next race: 2002 G.I. Joe's 200
