= 2001 Miller Lite 200 =

Coordinates: 40°41′21.46″N 82°38′10.94″W

(United States) 2001 Miller Lite 200
Race details
- Race 13 of 21 in the 2001 CART season
- Date: August 12, 2001
- Official name: 2001 Miller Lite 200
- Location: Mid-Ohio Sports Car Course, Lexington, Ohio, United States
- Course: Road course 2.258 mi / 3.634 km
- Distance: 83 laps 187.414 mi / 301.613 km

Pole position
- Driver: (Brazil) (Brazil) Gil de Ferran (Team Penske)
- Time: 1:05.442

Fastest lap
- Driver: (Brazil) (Brazil) Hélio Castroneves (Team Penske)
- Time: 1:07.669 (on lap 51 of 83)

Podium
- First: (Brazil) (Brazil) Hélio Castroneves (Team Penske)
- Second: (Brazil) (Brazil) Gil de Ferran (Team Penske)
- Third: (Canada) (Canada) Patrick Carpentier (Forsythe Racing)

The 2001 Miller Lite 200 was a Championship Auto Racing Teams (CART) motor race held on August 12, 2001, at Mid-Ohio Sports Car Course in Lexington, Ohio, USA. It was the 13th round of the 2001 CART FedEx Championship Series season. Team Penske dominated the event, with Gil de Ferran taking pole position and Hélio Castroneves finishing ahead of de Ferran in the race itself. Patrick Carpentier finished 3rd.

Castroneves had earned his third win of the season and the last of his CART career by taking advantage of a faster pitstop during the first half of the race and staying ahead the rest of the way. Castroneves was now within one point of championship leader Kenny Bräck, who collided with his teammate in the race and ended up three laps down in 20th place. de Ferran was also continuing a streak of high points-paying positions, and his podium at the race put him third overall. Carpentier scored his third consecutive podium and continued a run of good results for Forsythe Racing.

The race hinged on pitstops and fuel strategy, as many drivers gambled on off-schedule stops to try to make up positions on a track that was notoriously difficult to pass on. Nevertheless, it was Team Penske's conventional strategy that allowed both drivers to finish 1–2.

== Qualifying ==
August 11, 2001 - Qualifying Speeds
Rank	Driver	Time	Leader	Speed (mph)	Team
1	(Brazil) Gil de Ferran	1:05.442	—	124.214	Team Penske
2	(Brazil) Hélio Castroneves	1:05.877	+0.435	123.394	Team Penske
3	(Canada) Patrick Carpentier	1:05.905	+0.463	123.341	Forsythe Racing
4	(United States) Jimmy Vasser	1:05.931	+0.489	123.293	Patrick Racing
5	(Scotland) Dario Franchitti	1:06.012	+0.570	123.141	Team Green
6	(Canada) Alex Tagliani	1:06.093	+0.651	122.990	Forsythe Racing
7	(Brazil) Tony Kanaan	1:06.196	+0.754	122.799	Mo Nunn Racing
8	(Canada) Paul Tracy	1:06.361	+0.919	122.494	Team Green
9	(Brazil) Christian Fittipaldi	1:06.364	+0.922	122.488	Newman-Haas Racing
10	(Brazil) Bruno Junqueira (R)	1:06.395	+0.953	122.431	Chip Ganassi Racing
11	(Brazil) Cristiano da Matta	1:06.469	+1.027	122.295	Newman-Haas Racing
12	(New Zealand) Scott Dixon (R)	1:06.480	+1.038	122.274	PacWest Racing
13	(Sweden) Kenny Bräck	1:06.494	+1.052	122.249	Team Rahal
14	(United States) Bryan Herta	1:06.510	+1.068	122.219	Forsythe Racing
15	(Brazil) Roberto Moreno	1:06.550	+1.108	122.146	Patrick Racing
16	(Mexico) Adrian Fernández	1:06.649	+1.207	121.964	Fernandez Racing
17	(United States) Memo Gidley	1:06.776	+1.334	121.732	Chip Ganassi Racing
18	(United States) Michael Andretti	1:06.806	+1.364	121.678	Team Motorola
19	(Italy) Max Papis	1:06.939	+1.497	121.436	Team Rahal
20	(Italy) Alex Zanardi	1:07.068	+1.626	121.202	Mo Nunn Racing
21	(Brazil) Maurício Gugelmin	1:07.105	+1.664	121.134	PacWest Racing
22	(Japan) Tora Takagi (R)	1:07.168	+1.726	121.022	Walker Motorsport
23	(Japan) Shinji Nakano	1:07.235	+1.793	120.901	Fernandez Racing
24	(Brazil) Max Wilson (R)	1:07.508	+2.066	120.412	Arciero Racing
25	(Mexico) Michel Jourdain Jr.	1:07.678	+2.236	120.110	Bettenhausen Racing
26	(Spain) Oriol Servià	1:08.364	+2.922	120.110	Sigma Autosport

== Race ==
Pos	No	Driver	Team	Laps	Time/retired	Grid	Points
1	3	(Brazil) Hélio Castroneves	Team Penske	83	1:44:54.931	2	21^{1}
2	1	(Brazil) Gil de Ferran	Team Penske	83	+1.568	1	17^{2}
3	32	(Canada) Patrick Carpentier	Forsythe Racing	83	+2.548	3	14
4	26	(Canada) Paul Tracy	Team Green	83	+5.326	8	12
5	55	(Brazil) Tony Kanaan	Mo Nunn Racing	83	+6.155	7	10
6	20	(Brazil) Roberto Moreno	Patrick Racing	83	+6.703	15	8
7	33	(Canada) Alex Tagliani	Forsythe Racing	83	+7.537	6	6
8	11	(Brazil) Christian Fittipaldi	Newman-Haas Racing	83	+11.322	9	5
9	22	(Spain) Oriol Servià	Sigma Autosport	83	+14.561	26	4
10	6	(Brazil) Cristiano da Matta	Newman-Haas Racing	83	+15.247	11	3
11	12	(United States) Memo Gidley	Chip Ganassi Racing	83	+15.938	17	2
12	18	(New Zealand) Scott Dixon (R)	PacWest Racing	83	+16.336	12	1
13	4	(Brazil) Bruno Junqueira (R)	Chip Ganassi Racing	83	+17.001	10	—
14	17	(Brazil) Maurício Gugelmin	PacWest Racing	83	+21.843	21	—
15	25	(Brazil) Max Wilson (R)	Arciero Racing	83	+23.739	24	—
16	27	(Scotland) Dario Franchitti	Team Green	83	+49.669	5	—
17	16	(Mexico) Michel Jourdain Jr.	Bettenhausen Racing	82	+1 Lap	25	—
18	52	(Japan) Shinji Nakano	Fernandez Racing	82	+1 Lap	23	—
19	66	(Italy) Alex Zanardi	Mo Nunn Racing	80	+3 Laps	20	—
20	8	(Sweden) Kenny Bräck	Team Rahal	80	+3 Laps	13	—
21	5	(Japan) Tora Takagi (R)	Walker Motorsport	72	Off course	22	—
22	51	(Mexico) Adrian Fernández	Fernandez Racing	50	Contact	16	—
23	40	(United States) Jimmy Vasser	Patrick Racing	34	Contact	4	—
24	7	(Italy) Max Papis	Team Rahal	30	Contact	19	—
25	77	(United States) Bryan Herta	Forsythe Racing	14	Engine	14	—
26	39	(United States) Michael Andretti	Team Motorola	5	Engine	18	—

Notes

- ^{1}– Includes one bonus point for leading the most laps.
- ^{2}– Includes one bonus point for being the fastest qualifier.

== Race statistics ==
- Lead changes: 3 among 3 drivers

Lap Leaders
Laps	Leader
1–28	Gil de Ferran
29-54	Helio Castroneves
55-65	Oriol Servià
66-83	Helio Castroneves

Total laps led
Leader	Laps
Helio Castroneves	44
Gil de Ferran	28
Oriol Servià	11

Cautions: 3 for 11 laps
Laps	Reason
31-34	Papis and Bräck collide
51-56	Fernández crashes at Turn 4
74-76	Takagi stalls

== Standings after the race ==
Drivers' standings

Pos	+/-	Driver	Points
1		(Sweden) Kenny Bräck	104
2		(Brazil) Hélio Castroneves	103
3	2	(Brazil) Gil de Ferran	89
4	1	(Scotland) Dario Franchitti	81
5	1	(United States) Michael Andretti	73

Constructors' standings

Pos	+/–	Constructor	Points
1		(United Kingdom) Reynard	228
2		(United Kingdom) Lola	191

Manufacturer's Standings

Pos	+/-	Manufacturer	Points
1		(Japan) Honda	212
2		(United Kingdom) Ford-Cosworth	185
3		(Japan) Toyota	174
4		(United Kingdom) Phoenix	0

Previous race: 2001 Target Grand Prix	CART FedEx Championship Series; 2001 season	Next race: 2001 Motorola 220
Previous race: 2000 Miller Lite 200	Miller Lite 200	Next race: 2002 CART Grand Prix of Mid-Ohio
