= 2001 Marconi Grand Prix of Cleveland =

Coordinates: 41°31′03″N 81°41′00″W

(United States) 2001 Grand Prix of Cleveland
Race details
- Race 9 of 21 in the 2001 CART season
- Date: July 1, 2001
- Official name: 2001 Marconi Grand Prix of Cleveland Presented by Firstar
- Location: Burke Lakefront Airport, Cleveland, Ohio, United States
- Course: Temporary Street Course; 2.106 mi / 3.389 km
- Distance: 100 laps 210.6 mi / 338.9 km

Pole position
- Driver: (Brazil) (Brazil) Maurício Gugelmin (PacWest Racing)
- Time: 57.356

Fastest lap
- Driver: (Brazil) (Brazil) Roberto Moreno (Patrick Racing)
- Time: 58.779 (on lap 93 of 100)

Podium
- First: (Scotland) (Scotland) Dario Franchitti (Team Green)
- Second: (United States) (United States) Memo Gidley (Chip Ganassi Racing)
- Third: (United States) (United States) Bryan Herta (Forsythe Racing)

The 2001 Marconi Grand Prix of Cleveland Presented By Firstar was a Championship Auto Racing Teams (CART) motor race held on July 1, 2001, at Burke Lakefront Airport in Cleveland, Ohio, United States. It was the 9th round of the 2001 CART FedEx Championship Series season. Team Green driver Dario Franchitti won the race after narrowly escaping a first-turn pile-up and then by gambling on a fuel-saving strategy that saw his car run out of fuel just after crossing the finish line ahead of a hard-charging Memo Gidley and Bryan Herta.

Franchitti had won his first race since 1999 and the first for Team Green since Vancouver in 2000, vaulting the driver to 3rd in the points standings. Gidley took his first career podium in only his second start for Chip Ganassi Racing after replacing Nicolas Minassian at the previous race in Portland. Herta gave Forsythe Racing its first podium of the season after a dismal start to 2001.

The race was a battle of multiple strategies after a rained-out qualifying session the day before produced an unusual starting grid; fuel mileage, the number of pit stops, and a chaotic first-lap incident ultimately determined the outcome of the race.

== Report ==
=== Background ===
Just a week prior, Max Papis had won his second career race in rain-soaked Portland for Team Rahal while his teammate Kenny Bräck was still in control of the drivers' championship. The team was on a hot streak, winning three of the last four events, and the next race was in team owner Bobby Rahal's home state of Ohio.

Much to the concern of race engineers, the weather forecast going into the weekend at Cleveland also seemed to predict rain on raceday, which would affect handling and grip on an already bumpy track surface. Nevertheless, the teams and drivers were looking forward to the annual race at Cleveland, which was popular with the fans and unique on the calendar for its speed and an unusual amount of room to pass other cars.

In the lead-up to the race weekend, it was announced that CART would not return to race at Michigan International Speedway for the 2002 season; the speedway had hosted the series every year since 1970 and it would never host CART again.

It's not a question of us not wanting to be at Michigan, the fact is that Michigan has an alternative plan that doesn't include us ... The fact that we're not going to be racing at Michigan anymore is disappointing, but we still have a marquee event at Fontana through 2004.

— Joseph Heitzler, CART Chairman and CEO, in a press conference on June 30, 2001

Rival series Indy Racing League would pick up where CART left off and run its own race at the speedway from 2002 to 2007. Michigan would join Texas, Nazareth, Detroit, Lausitz, and Houston as race events that would not appear on the 2002 CART calendar.

=== Practice and Qualifying ===
The sun shined on Friday morning practice as drivers took to the track for the first time. Several drivers had difficulties coming to grips with the track surface; in the morning session alone, Alex Zanardi, Shinji Nakano, Roberto Moreno, and Alex Tagliani would all make contact with the barriers in different corners. At the end of the 1 hour, 45 minute session, Cristiano da Matta led the rest of the field as the only car to break into the 58-second range with a 58.905.

By the time the second Friday practice began, clouds had rolled in and covered the area in overcast conditions. Once again da Matta topped the session with a 57.905, and the top twelve cars were all separated by less than a second.

The weather going into Saturday was foreboding, as forecasts called for thunderstorms later in the afternoon during qualifying. For Saturday morning practice, however, the rains stayed away. Only Bryan Herta could beat da Matta's previous best lap, clocking in a 57.902. da Matta, meanwhile, could only muster 4th place in the practice session.

The dark clouds looming over the track on Saturday afternoon threatened to pour rain at any time during qualifying. The rules governing qualifying, which meant that the field would be split into two groups and run one after the other, meant that one group could be at a huge disadvantage if the rain started to fall. At 1:45 PM, the first group, containing the bottom thirteen drivers in the points standings, went out on tracking for qualifying. The rain stayed away for the thirty-minute session, and the dry track allowed Maurício Gugelmin to top the time sheets with a 57.356 on his final lap. He was followed by Adrián Fernández and rookie Max Wilson.

With the second group about to qualify at 2:30 PM, the long-awaited rain finally began to lightly drizzle on the track. Drivers continued on without rain tires, and Bräck, Scott Dixon, and Paul Tracy would each spin on the slippery track just minutes after the beginning of the session. The light rain meant that the track would quickly dry up, and the lap times subsequently began to rise with each passing minute. However, at 2:47 PM, CART suspended the qualifying session when lightning was spotted close to the track, bringing with it high winds and more spots of rain. According to CART rules, both qualifying groups were guaranteed at least twenty minutes of green-flag running, and so when the session resumed the drivers would be given five-and-a-half minutes to finish qualifying. At the time the session was stopped, Dario Franchitti was leading the group with a 59.803, which put him 14th behind all of the other first group runners. When the green flag finally came back out almost thirty minutes later, the track had multiple areas of standing water, meaning that none of the drivers in the second group would be able to put in a better time, much less compete with the drivers in the first group.

The bizarre events in qualifying had allowed Gugelmin to take his first pole position since the 1997 Marlboro 500 and the fourth of his career. In post-qualifying comments, Gugelmin remarked that his lap time would have held up even if the second group hadn't experienced rain, but he also lamented that the current system of two-session qualifying was prone to scenarios like what happened earlier in the day.

2nd place Fernández and 3rd place Wilson, however, acknowledged that luck had finally been in their respective favors:

I don't feel bad about the guys in the back to be honest. I've had good cars before and had to be in the back. I'm sure it's frustrating for them because of the circumstances. But I'm happy that this happened because maybe the system will change for the better to make it more fair for everyone.

— Adrian Fernández, in a post-qualifying interview

We got lucky that it rained on the second group, but the car was good. Maybe we would have been in the Top 10 or 12. That's the first time we had better track conditions than them [the second group]; we're still at a disadvantage.

— Max Wilson, in a post-qualifying interview

Last-place Tracy put it best:

It's a giant pain in the butt because when it started to sprinkle, we didn't go right out. We didn't know what to do. Wets? Dry tires? You go around in circles biting your own tail. It was our mistake not to get out there when the track was faster.

— Paul Tracy, in a post-qualifying interview

=== Race ===
Morning warmup saw similar overcast conditions like the day before, threatening to rain on the track with storms expected by the time race began in the afternoon. Hélio Castroneves led the pack in the session with a 59.907.

As race time approached, the storm system that brought about a tornado watch 50 miles west of Cleveland and had been forecast to the hit the track had moved southward, although the skies were still overcast and winds of 25 mph continued to blow across the circuit.

A little after 1:00 PM, the race began with Gugelmin leading the field into the hazardous Turn 1. Gugelmin locked up the brakes and went wide at the corner as the cars bunched up behind him, allowing Wilson to take the lead. History repeated itself as multiple incidents forced several cars off the track and onto the grass. Patrick Carpentier and Michel Jourdain Jr., starting in the midfield, both spun after being hit by Tony Kanaan and defending race winner Moreno. Only Jourdain was able to be restarted, but he limped back to the pits and officially retired the car.

The caution flag came out as a result of the first-turn accident as rookie Wilson led his first-ever laps in CART, followed by Tagliani and Memo Gidley; the first row of Gugelmin and Fernández had fallen back to 5th and 4th, respectively. Bräck had made an astounding leap from 17th to 6th in just a few corners, hugging the inside of the first corner to avoid the fracas and accelerating past several more cars before the caution came out. Multiple cars near the back of the field used the caution period to top off on fuel, hoping to move up the field through alternate strategies.

On Lap 4 the green flag waved as Wilson led the field single-file into Turn 1. Bräck had managed to get past Gugelmin for 5th place, and began to work on Fernández. Herta, who had fallen from 4th to 10th after the first corner incident, was also beginning to make his way back up the order. On Lap 7, Tracy pulled into the pits and retired with an engine problem.

The top five drivers were running within two seconds and beginning to pull away from 6th place Zanardi, who was bottling up the field behind him. On Lap 13, Gidley was able to pass Tagliani for 2nd place; two laps later, Fernández and Bräck were also able to get around him for 3rd and 4th place. Tagliani began to fall back from the top four drivers as the pace quickened. Gidley continued to stalk Wilson for several laps, making unsuccessful moves for the lead going into Turn 1. Finally, on Lap 21, Gidley was able to pass for the lead going through Turn 4 and take off into the distance.

With little on-track action occurring in the meantime, on Lap 31 the leaders began to make their first pit stops. Gidley handed the lead back to Wilson, who continued on-track for a few more laps. Fernández and Bräck followed in behind. Both cars exited the pits side by side and continued to battle for position for several corners before Bräck could finally get by.

As the rest of the field came into the pits, Bruno Junqueira ran into the back of Christian Fittipaldi, damaging the front suspension and breaking the front left tire off. Fittipaldi continued on, but Junqueira's car came to a stop at the entrance to the pitlane. This was the second race in a row where Junqueira was forced to retire as a result of a collision in the pitlane. The position of his car meant that Wilson, who was about to enter the pits himself, would be unable to pull into his pit box for service. Unaware of the situation, he pulled into pitlane and was forced to drive through without being serviced, losing valuable time and forcing him to come back on the next lap.

Several cars, including Moreno, Jimmy Vasser, Kanaan, and Papis, stayed out a lap longer than the rest of the field before finally pitting and handing the lead back to Gidley. In the round of pitstops, Franchitti was able to gain positions, putting him 5th behind Zanardi and ahead of Herta. By Lap 41, Gidley was beginning to lap the rest of the field. At the same time, Nakano's turbocharger let go on-course, forcing him to limp to the pits and retire the car.

Little changed throughout the field as Gidley continued to extend his lead over 2nd-place Bräck. By Lap 53, Zanardi was able to get around Fernández for 3rd place. On Lap 59, Zanardi initiated the second round of pitstops, giving up his position while the rest of the field went around. He exited just ahead of Wilson, running 18th, who was ahead of Gidley trying not to go a lap down. Wilson, trying to get around Zanardi going into Turn 6, clipped his wing on Zanardi's left rear tire, forcing him to make a lengthy pitstop to change the wing. Zanardi was forced to hit pitlane as well due to a flat tire, doing so at the same time Gidley gave up the lead to Bräck to make his second stop on Lap 62.

Bräck led the field for a lap before entering the pits; new leader Fernández stayed out one lap longer before doing the same and handing the lead to Franchitti. The fuel strategy game was finally coming to fruition: cars that were able to save fuel and stay out longer than the leaders, in this case Franchitti, Herta, Moreno, Dixon, and Vasser, could potentially make it to the finish on only two pit stops. Meanwhile, drivers like Gidley and Gil de Ferran, who came in for their second stops a few laps earlier, were committed to a three-stop strategy. Those drivers could run all-out knowing that they had to make a splash-and-go at the end of the race; the two-stoppers would have to depend on saving fuel and hope for caution laps to make it to the end.

Franchitti and Herta made their second and last stops of the race on Lap 66, along with a large portion of the field. Vasser was able to stay out until Lap 69 before pitting; Moreno until Lap 70. With the second pitstops finished, Gidley was back in the lead with de Ferran 2nd, Franchitti 3rd, Herta 4th, and Bräck 5th.

On Lap 74, Dixon made contact with Tora Takagi going into Turn 6, sending both cars off-track and damaging Dixon's front suspension. He was able to get back to the pits, but by the time the car was able to get back on track he was five laps down.

On Lap 80, de Ferran came in for his final stop. Unfortunately, a problem with the fueling mechanism meant that it took fourteen seconds to fill the car with fuel instead of the expected four, dropping him back to 7th place. In the meantime, leader Gidley began to extend his lead over Franchitti with each passing lap, hoping to put enough of a gap between them so that he could potentially come back in 1st place after his final stop.

On Lap 86 Fernández came into the pits from 8th place and retired the car due to an engine problem. At the same time, Moreno had gotten around Bräck and was beginning to pressure Herta for 3rd place. On Lap 89, Moreno got tangled up with Herta in Turn 8, sending both gently in the tire barriers. Herta, who was spun around, was able to keep going and only lost one position to Bräck; Moreno stalled the car and had to wait to be restarted before continuing, falling back to 12th.

On the next lap Gidley finally entered the pits for a splash-and-go, but the gap was not wide enough to remain in first place; he relinquished the lead to Franchitti and came out of the pits just ahead of Bräck. However, because he did not have worry about saving fuel, he could run at a faster pace and catch up to Franchitti. On Lap 94 Bräck was forced to pit for fuel, giving up 3rd place to Herta and falling back to 5th.

Gidley was closing in fast on Franchitti as the laps wound down. By Lap 97 the only car between them was the lapped car of Michael Andretti, but as Gidley looked to overtake Andretti going into Turn 1 he locked up the brakes, losing valuable time. He finally got around Andretti on the next lap, but now Franchitti had lapped Wilson and put four seconds between them. On the last lap of the race, Franchitti was forced to slow down even more; halfway through the lap Gidley was able to get around Wilson and close the gap to first place. It was too little, too late, however, as Franchitti came out of the Turn 9-10 chicane onto the front straightaway and take the checkered flag by just three tenths of a second. Franchitti then ran out of fuel entering Turn 1.

=== Post-race ===
Franchitti was able to coax the car into victory lane for his seventh career CART win. His last win was at Surfer's Paradise in 1999. It would be his only win of 2001, but he would record two more podiums before the season ended. It was also Team Green's first win of the season. The win vaulted Franchitti into third place in the points standings, while de Ferran's 4th-place finish moved him up three places into 4th overall.

Gidley's 2nd place in only his second start in the car would be his first of three podiums during the season and of his open-wheel racing career, as well as the first podium for Chip Ganassi Racing in the 2001 season.

Meanwhile, Herta's 3rd place was a high point in an otherwise mediocre season driving for Forsythe Racing, scoring the team's first podium of the season and kicking off a streak of good results for the team that saw one win and multiple podiums. For Herta, however, his only other points-scoring finish for the rest of the year would be a 5th place at Michigan.

== Qualifying ==
June 30, 2001 - Qualifying Speeds
Rank	Driver	Time	Leader	Speed (mph)	Team
1	(Brazil) Maurício Gugelmin	57.356	—	132.185	PacWest Racing
2	(Mexico) Adrian Fernández	57.717	+0.161	131.815	Fernandez Racing
3	(Brazil) Max Wilson (R)	57.892	+0.536	130.961	Arciero Racing
4	(United States) Bryan Herta	57.904	+0.548	130.934	Forsythe Racing
5	(United States) Memo Gidley	57.916	+0.560	130.907	Chip Ganassi Racing
6	(Brazil) Tony Kanaan	57.936	+0.580	130.862	Mo Nunn Racing
7	(Canada) Alex Tagliani	57.942	+0.586	130.848	Forsythe Racing
8	(Japan) Tora Takagi (R)	58.227	+0.871	130.208	Walker Motorsport
9	(Canada) Patrick Carpentier	58.230	+0.874	130.201	Forsythe Racing
10	(Japan) Shinji Nakano	58.237	+0.881	130.185	Fernandez Racing
11	(Mexico) Michel Jourdain Jr.	58.424	+1.068	129.769	Bettenhausen Racing
12	(Spain) Oriol Servià	58.430	+1.074	129.755	Sigma Autosport
13	(Italy) Alex Zanardi	58.570	+1.214	129.445	Mo Nunn Racing
14	(Scotland) Dario Franchitti	59.803	+2.447	126.776	Team Green
15	(Brazil) Christian Fittipaldi	1:00.516	+3.160	125.283	Newman-Haas Racing
16	(Brazil) Bruno Junqueira (R)	1:01.826	+4.470	122.628	Chip Ganassi Racing
17	(Sweden) Kenny Bräck	1:01.992	+4.636	122.300	Team Rahal
18	(New Zealand) Scott Dixon (R)	1:02.049	+4.693	122.187	PacWest Racing
19	(Brazil) Cristiano da Matta	1:02.093	+4.737	122.101	Newman-Haas Racing
20	(Brazil) Gil de Ferran	1:02.625	+5.269	121.063	Team Penske
21	(United States) Michael Andretti	1:02.802	+5.446	120.722	Team Motorola
22	(Italy) Max Papis	1:03.635	+6.279	119.142	Team Rahal
23	(Brazil) Hélio Castroneves	1:04.155	+6.799	118.176	Team Penske
24	(United States) Jimmy Vasser	1:06.323	+8.967	114.313	Patrick Racing
25	(Brazil) Roberto Moreno	1:06.963	+9.607	113.221	Patrick Racing
26	(Canada) Paul Tracy	1:09.456	+11.801	109.456	Team Green

== Race ==
Pos	No	Driver	Team	Laps	Time/retired	Grid	Points
1	27	(Scotland) Dario Franchitti	Team Green	100	1:47:04.723	14	20
2	12	(United States) Memo Gidley	Chip Ganassi Racing	100	+0.305	5	17^{1}
3	77	(United States) Bryan Herta	Forsythe Racing	100	+7.897	4	14
4	1	(Brazil) Gil de Ferran	Team Penske	100	+12.070	20	12
5	40	(United States) Jimmy Vasser	Patrick Racing	100	+21.298	24	10
6	8	(Sweden) Kenny Bräck	Team Rahal	100	+22.061	17	8
7	6	(Brazil) Cristiano da Matta	Newman-Haas Racing	100	+27.539	19	6
8	20	(Brazil) Roberto Moreno	Patrick Racing	100	+28.108	25	5
9	33	(Canada) Alex Tagliani	Forsythe Racing	100	+30.376	7	4
10	17	(Brazil) Maurício Gugelmin	PacWest Racing	100	+31.838	1	4^{2}
11	11	(Brazil) Christian Fittipaldi	Newman-Haas Racing	100	+43.157	15	2
12	3	(Brazil) Hélio Castroneves	Team Penske	100	+43.799	23	1
13	66	(Italy) Alex Zanardi	Mo Nunn Racing	100	+52.841	13	—
14	5	(Japan) Tora Takagi (R)	Walker Motorsport	99	+53.455	5	—
15	39	(United States) Michael Andretti	Team Motorola	99	+1 Lap	21	—
16	55	(Brazil) Tony Kanaan	Mo Nunn Racing	99	+1 Lap	6	—
17	22	(Spain) Oriol Servià	Sigma Autosport	99	+1 Lap	12	—
18	7	(Italy) Max Papis	Team Rahal	99	+1 Lap	22	—
19	25	(Brazil) Max Wilson (R)	Arciero Racing	96	+4 Laps	3	—
20	18	(New Zealand) Scott Dixon (R)	PacWest Racing	95	+5 Laps	18	—
21	51	(Mexico) Adrian Fernández	Fernandez Racing	86	Engine	2	—
22	52	(Japan) Shinji Nakano	Fernandez Racing	41	Turbocharger	10	—
23	4	(Brazil) Bruno Junqueira (R)	Chip Ganassi Racing	31	Contact	16	—
24	26	(Canada) Paul Tracy	Team Green	7	Engine	26	—
25	16	(Mexico) Michel Jourdain Jr.	Bettenhausen Racing	1	Contact	11	—
26	32	(Canada) Patrick Carpentier	Forsythe Racing	0	Contact	9	—

Notes

- ^{1}– Includes one bonus point for leading the most laps.
- ^{2}– Includes one bonus point for being the fastest qualifier.

== Race statistics ==
- Lead changes: 10 among 6 drivers

Lap Leaders
Laps	Leader
1–20	Max Wilson
21-30	Memo Gidley
31-33	Max Wilson
34-35	Roberto Moreno
36-61	Memo Gidley
62	Kenny Bräck
63	Adrian Fernández
64-65	Dario Franchitti
66-69	Roberto Moreno
70-90	Memo Gidley
91-100	Dario Franchitti

Total laps led
Leader	Laps
Memo Gidley	57
Max Wilson	23
Dario Franchitti	12
Roberto Moreno	6
Kenny Bräck	1
Adrian Fernández	1

Cautions: 1 for 3 laps
Laps	Reason
1-4	Multiple Turn 1 incidents

== Standings after the race ==
Drivers' standings

Pos	+/-	Driver	Points
1		(Sweden) Kenny Bräck	84
2		(Brazil) Hélio Castroneves	70
3	3	(Scotland) Dario Franchitti	65
4	3	(Brazil) Gil de Ferran	56
5	1	(Brazil) Cristiano da Matta	55

Constructors' standings

Pos	+/–	Constructor	Points
1		(United Kingdom) Reynard	151
2		(United Kingdom) Lola	147

Manufacturer's Standings

Pos	+/-	Manufacturer	Points
1		(Japan) Honda	136
2		(Japan) Toyota	132
3		(United Kingdom) Ford-Cosworth	114
4		(United Kingdom) Phoenix	0

Previous race: 2001 Freightliner/G.I. Joe's 200	CART FedEx Championship Series; 2001 season	Next race: 2001 Molson Indy Toronto
Previous race: 2000 Marconi Grand Prix of Cleveland	Marconi Grand Prix of Cleveland	Next race: 2002 Marconi Grand Prix of Cleveland
