= Lola B2K/00 =

Racing car designed and built by Lola Cars

- Category: CART IndyCar
- Constructor: Lola
- Predecessor: Lola B99/00
- Successor: Lola B01/00

Technical specifications
- Length: 4,978 mm (196 in)
- Width: 2,032 mm (80 in)
- Height: 940 mm (37 in)
- Axle track: 1,753 mm (69 in) (Front); 1,638 mm (64 in) (Rear)
- Wheelbase: 3,048 mm (120 in)
- Engine: Mercedes-Benz IC108E; Toyota RV8E; Ford/Cosworth XF 2.65 L (2,650 cc; 162 cu in) V8 mid-engined
- Transmission: 6-speed sequential manual
- Weight: 1,550 lb (700 kg)
- Fuel: Methanol
- Tyres: Bridgestone; Firestone Firehawk

Competition history
- Debut: 2000 Marlboro Grand Prix of Miami; Miami, Florida

The Lola B2K/00 is an open-wheel racing car chassis, designed and built by Lola Cars that competed in the CART open-wheel racing series, for competition in the 2000 season.
