= 2001 Molson Indy Toronto =

Coordinates: 43°37′58″N 79°24′58″W

(Canada) 2001 Molson Indy Toronto
Race details
- Race 10 of 21 in the 2001 CART season
- Exhibition Place track layout
- Date: July 15, 2001
- Official name: Molson Indy Toronto
- Location: Exhibition Place, Toronto, Ontario, Canada
- Course: Temporary Street Course; 1.755 mi / 2.824 km
- Distance: 95 laps 166.725 mi / 268.318 km
- Weather: Partly cloudy and warm with temperatures reaching up to 27 °C (81 °F)

Pole position
- Driver: (Brazil) Gil de Ferran (Team Penske)
- Time: 57.703

Fastest lap
- Driver: (Brazil) Hélio Castroneves (Team Penske)
- Time: 59.028 (on lap 61 of 95)

Podium
- First: (United States) {Michael Andretti (Team Motorola)
- Second: (Canada) Alex Tagliani (Forsythe Racing)
- Third: (Mexico) Adrián Fernández (Fernández Racing)

The 2001 Molson Indy Toronto was a Championship Auto Racing Teams (CART) motor race held on July 15, 2001, at the Exhibition Place circuit in Toronto, Ontario, Canada. It was the tenth round of the 2001 CART season, the 16th annual edition of the Molson Indy Toronto, and the first of two events that were held in Canada. The 95-lap race was won by Team Motorola driver Michael Andretti, who started from the 13th position. Alex Tagliani finished second for the Forsythe Racing team, and Fernández Racing driver Adrián Fernández came in third.

Gil de Ferran won the pole position and maintained his lead throughout the race's first half. Andretti made contact with Scott Dixon on the first lap and made a pit stop along with a change of strategy to move up the field. Hélio Castroneves took over the lead after de Ferran made a pit stop for fuel and held it for 15 laps before he retired with a mechanical issue. Fernández and Tony Kanaan held the first position over the next seven laps. Andretti moved into first place on the 71st lap and maintained the position to win the race.

There were eleven cautions and four lead changes by five different drivers during the course of the race. It was Andretti's first (and only) victory of the season, his seventh at Toronto, and the 41st of his career. The result advanced Andretti to second in the Drivers' Championship, ten points behind leader Kenny Bräck, while Castroneves fell to third place, with eleven races left in the season. Approximately 73,628 people attended the event, which attracted 726,000 television viewers in the United States.

== Background ==
The Molson Indy Toronto was confirmed as part of CART's 2001 series' schedule in August 2000. It was the sixteenth consecutive year the race was held in the series, and the first of two races that were held in Canada. The Molson Indy Toronto was the tenth of 21 scheduled races for 2001 by CART, and was held on July 15. Prior to the race, Team Rahal driver Kenny Bräck led the Drivers' Championship with 83 points, 13 ahead of Hélio Castroneves in second, with Dario Franchitti third. Gil de Ferran was fourth on 56 points, one in front of Cristiano da Matta in fifth. In the Manufacturers' Championship, Honda led with 136 points; Toyota was a close second with 132, followed by Ford Cosworth with 114.

Franchitti was considered one of the favorites to win the race having won the event two years previously and hoped to keep a recent string of good results in the 2001 season going at the track. Bräck expected to perform well despite retiring from the previous year's event and hoped he could regain the momentum he built from the start of the season. The race's defending champion Michael Andretti had secured six of his 40 career victories in Toronto and stated that he did not know if luck played a part but noted his driving style was suited to the circuit. Having finished in the points-scoring position in three of the previous four races, Alex Tagliani said it encouraged him heading into the Indy Toronto.

== Practice ==
There were two 75-minute practice sessions preceding Sunday's race. A test session, scheduled for Friday afternoon, ran for 90 minutes. Conditions were dry for the Friday practice sessions. De Ferran was fastest in the first practice session with a lap of 59.107 seconds; his teammate Castroneves was second. Tony Kanaan, Jimmy Vasser, Tagliani, Christian Fittipaldi, Da Matta, Patrick Carpentier, Franchitti and Paul Tracy were in third to tenth places. Four red flags came out: the first came when a fuel cover from Carpentier's car was located on the racing line, The second was for Bruno Junqueira' spin in turn eight and stalled on track, the third for Andretti who struck the turn eight tire barrier and damaged his left-front suspension; Bräck went onto the turn's run-off area to avoid hitting Andretti. The final stoppage was for de Ferran who slid into the turn one tire barrier and damaged his car's front.

In the second practice session, a further four stoppages occurred; Alex Zanardi slid and made light contact with the turn eight tire barrier and did not restart, metal debris was spotted in between turns three and four, Max Wilson stalled his car after he spun in the third turn, and Franchitti and Memo Gidley made contact in turn five and the latter was sent into the tire barrier which heavily damaged his right-hand suspension while Franchitti's right-front wheel broke. De Ferran set the fastest lap of the day with a time of 58.400 seconds, ahead of Fittipaldi and Franchitti. Kanaan was fourth-fastest; ahead of Andretti and his teammate Tracy. Da Matta, Tagliani, Max Papis and Adrián Fernández followed in the top ten. Shinji Nakano lapped fastest in the final practice session with a time of 58.133 seconds; Kanaan, Junqueira, De Ferran, Andretti, da Matta. Oriol Servià, Bryan Herta, Fernández and Maurício Gugelmin completed the top ten. The session was stopped four times: firstly for Vasser who stalled on the circuit; the second for Kanaan because his engine failed heading towards the start-finish line, the third was for Bräck who slid and hit the turn eight outside tire wall with his left front wheel and his suspension was broken. The final red-flag was for Vasser who locked his brakes and spun 360 degrees onto turn eight's run-off area.

== Qualifying ==
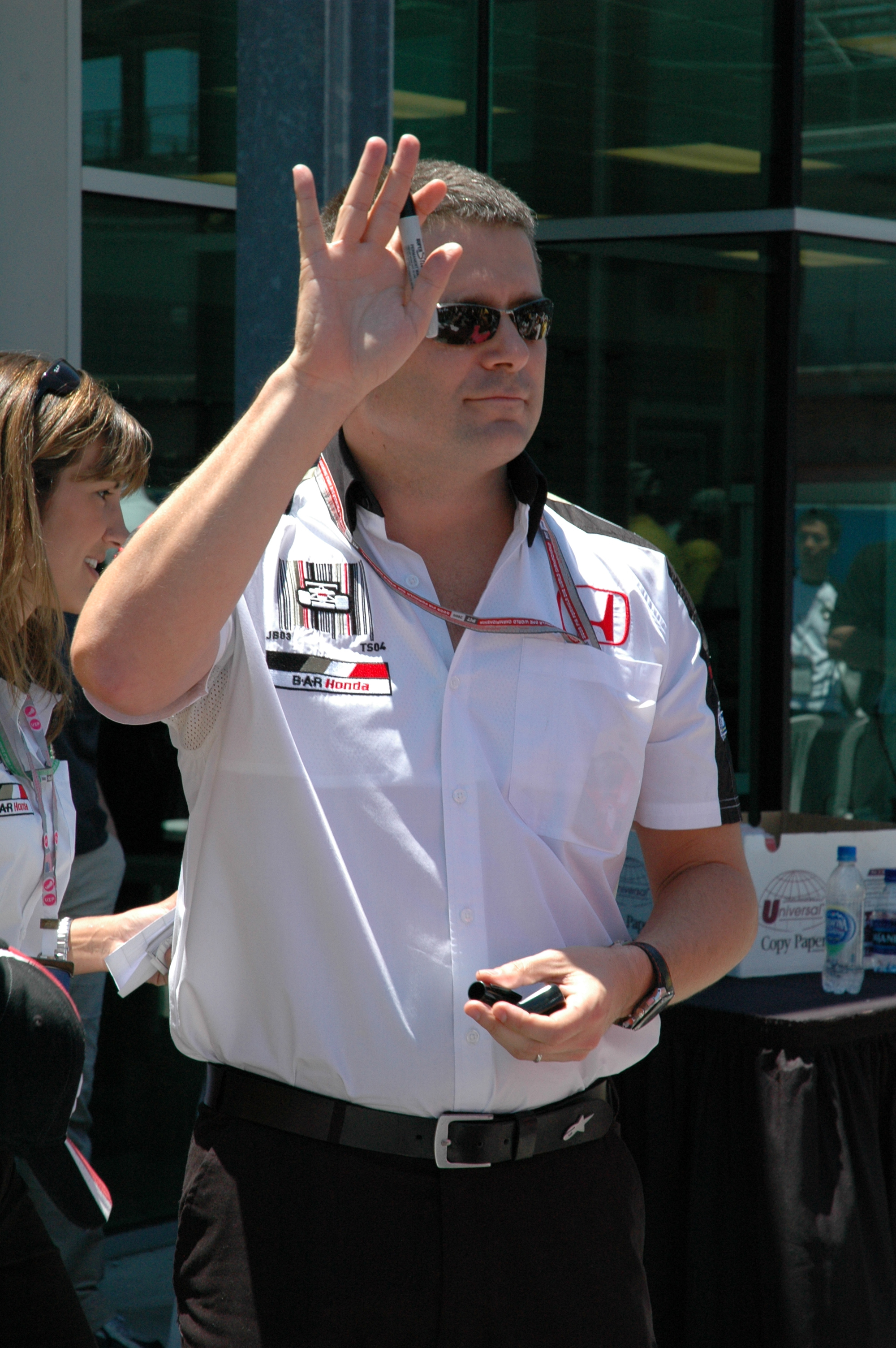
Gil de Ferran (pictured in 2005) had the twelfth pole position of his career.

Saturday afternoon's 75-minute qualifying session saw cars split into two groups with the leading championship point-standing leaders and the fastest two drivers from the previous road course race composing the second group. Both groups were allowed 30 minutes on the circuit with a 15-minute interval in between the two groups recording their lap times. Under warm weather conditions, De Ferran clinched his first pole position of the season, his second at Toronto, and the twelfth of his career with a time of 57.703 seconds. He was joined on the grid's front row by teammate Castroneves who had the pole position until de Ferran's lap. Bräck qualified third, Kanaan fourth and Tagliani fifth (all three drivers went onto the track's run-off areas but continued without damage to their cars.) Franchitti, Fernández, Tracy, Roberto Moreno and Scott Dixon rounded out the top ten qualifiers. Servià was the fastest driver not to qualify in the top ten; his best lap was 0.534 seconds off de Ferran's pace. He was followed by Carpentier in twelfth. Andretti, 13th, slid and hit the turn one tire barrier lightly with the left front section of his nose cone; he later contacted the turn five wall with his right-rear tire on his final timed lap. Fittipaldi took 14th position, ahead of Herta who spun at turn nine without damaging his car. Vasser, da Matta, Michel Jourdain Jr., Gugelmin, Junqueira, Papis and Tora Takagi filled the next seven places on the grid. 23rd-place qualifier Gidley made contact with Carpentier who was braking heavily for the turn eight right-hander and Gidley damaged his front suspension heavily with his front wheels out of line. Both drivers were unhurt. Zanardi took 24th position. Wilson and Nakano qualified at the back of the grid in 25th and 26th places; Wilson closely followed Nakano on his first timed lap, made heavy contact with the rear-left of Nakano's car and went airborne briefly. Both drivers were uninjured but switched to their back-up cars as their primary chassis were heavily damaged.

=== Qualifying classification ===
Qualifying results
Pos	No.	Driver	Team	Time	Speed	Gap
1	1	Gil de Ferran (BRA)	Team Penske	57.703	109.472	—
2	3	Hélio Castroneves (BRA)	Team Penske	57.767	109.370	+0.064
3	8	Kenny Bräck (SWE)	Team Rahal	57.886	109.146	+0.183
4	55	Tony Kanaan (BRA)	Mo Nunn Racing	57.923	109.076	+0.230
5	33	Alex Tagliani (CAN)	Forsythe Racing	57.997	108.937	+0.294
6	27	Dario Franchitti (GBR)	Team Green	58.109	108.727	+0.402
7	51	Adrián Fernández (MEX)	Fernández Racing	58.128	108.691	+0.425
8	26	Paul Tracy (CAN)	Team Green	58.161	108.629	+0.458
9	20	Roberto Moreno (BRA)	Patrick Racing	58.195	108.566	+0.492
10	18	Scott Dixon (NZL)	PacWest Racing	58.224	108.512	+0.521
11	22	Oriol Servià (ESP)	Sigma Autosport	58.237	108.488	+0.534
12	32	Patrick Carpentier (CAN)	Forsythe Racing	58.245	108.473	+0.542
13	39	Michael Andretti (USA)	Team Motorola	58.260	108.445	+0.557
14	11	Christian Fittipaldi (BRA)	Newman/Haas Racing	58.279	108.410	+0.576
15	77	Bryan Herta (USA)	Forsythe Racing	58.372	108.237	+0.659
16	40	Jimmy Vasser (USA)	Patrick Racing	58.390	108.203	+0.687
17	6	Cristiano da Matta (BRA)	Newman/Haas Racing	58.476	108.044	+0.763
18	16	Michel Jourdain Jr. (MEX)	Bettenhausen Racing	58.588	107.838	+0.855
19	17	Maurício Gugelmin (BRA)	PacWest Racing	58.601	107.814	+0.898
20	4	Bruno Junqueira (BRA)	Chip Ganassi Racing	58.609	107.799	+0.903
21	7	Max Papis (ITA)	Team Rahal	58.681	107.667	+0.978
22	5	Toranosuke Takagi (JPN)	Walker Racing	58.760	107.522	+1.067
23	12	Memo Gidley (USA)	Chip Ganassi Racing	58.778	107.489	+1.075
24	66	Alex Zanardi (ITA)	Mo Nunn Racing	58.945	107.185	+1.243
25	25	Max Wilson (BRA)	Arciero-Blair Racing	59.092	106.918	+1.389
26	52	Shinji Nakano (JPN)	Fernández Racing	59.488	106.206	+1.645

== Warm-up ==
The drivers took to the track at 9:00 a.m. local time for a 30-minute warm-up session where several drivers ran onto the track's run-off areas. Kanaan continued his good performance and recorded the fastest time of 59.869 seconds. Herta, Fernández, Bräck and de Ferran made up second to fifth places. Fernández locked his brakes and struck the turn five tire wall, stopping the session for three minutes to allow course officials to remove his car from the barrier. Franchitti and Junqueira made contact at the pit lane entrance but both drivers continued without any apparent damage.

== Race ==
Weather conditions for the start of the race were sunny but partly cloudy with an air temperature between 79 and 84 °F (26 and 29 °C) and a track temperature ranging from 116 to 123 °F (47 to 51 °C). Approximately 73,628 people attended the event. The race started at 1:04 p.m. de Ferran maintained his pole position advantage heading into the first turn. Kanaan was passed by Franchitti for fourth place on the backstretch. Entering the third corner, Andretti made contact with the side of Dixon which meant Andretti narrowly avoided hitting the outside wall. Fernández and Tracy made contact in turn five. The first caution of the race was prompted on the second lap when Andretti stalled and safety officials had to restart his car. Andretti chose to make a pit stop for fuel following a decision made by his team manager Kim Green. At the lap four restart, de Ferran maintained his lead over teammate Castroneves. On the following lap, Moreno spun in turn five and stalled in the centre of the track, triggering the second caution. Dixon spun to avoid hitting Moreno while da Matta and Vasser both stopped and made light contact with the front-ends of their cars. Vasser retired from the race because of the collision. de Ferran maintained his lead at the lap eight restart.

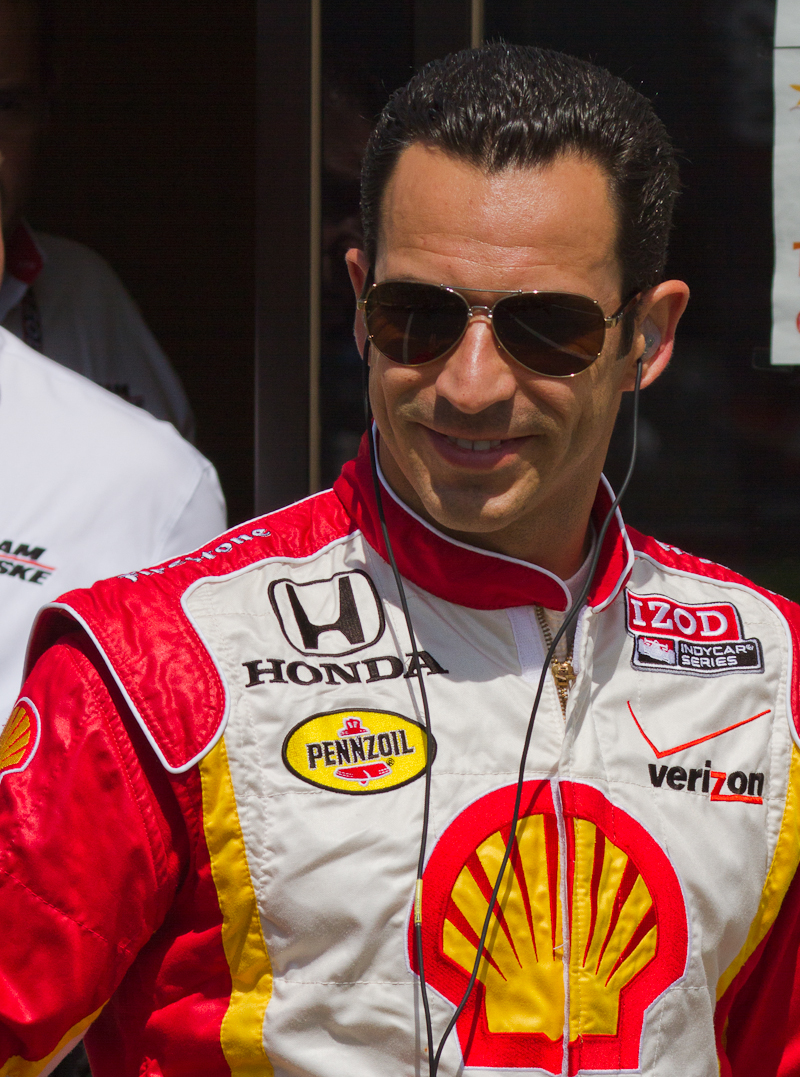
Hélio Castroneves (pictured in 2011) led 15 laps of the race.

The third caution was given on lap ten; Tracy glanced the rear-right wheel of Servià's car heading into turn three which caused both drivers to spin and stall. De Ferran led at the lap-12 restart, ahead of Bräck and Franchitti. Bräck was overtaken by Franchitti for second place around the outside of the third turn on lap 18, while Tagliani passed Kanaan at the same corner one lap later. De Ferran continued to pull away from the rest of the field and held a 7.5 second lead over Franchitti by the 30th lap. The fourth caution came out two laps later when Takagi made contact with the side of Wilson at the entrance of turn three. Both cars spun with Takagi going into the outside tire barrier and Wilson went onto the run-off area with a broken suspension. Franchitti drove onto the turn six run-off area to retire with an oil pressure problem on the same lap caused by a lack of oil in his car. During the caution, most of the field made pit stops. Dixon moved from 17th to fifth and Junqueira went from 18th to seventh position because they made pit stops before the caution was displayed. Andretti moved up from 15th to tenth place. De Ferran led the lap-37 restart, and was followed by Tagliani, Bräck, Castroneves and Dixon.

On the 39th lap, Castroneves overtook Bräck around the outside at turn three and moved into third place, and Fernández got ahead of Bräck around the outside at the same corner two laps later. Takagi drove to the inside of the third turn underneath Servià, and both drivers made contact with the side of their cars; Servià became briefly airborne and heavily damaged the left side of his car when he hit the outside wall which caused the fifth caution. Servià was unhurt but Takagi managed to continue without any apparent damage. The race resumed on lap 45 with de Ferran leading Tagliani. Castroneves hit the rear-end of Tagliani's car on the following lap but both drivers continued without damage. The sixth caution was shown on the 49th lap when Takagi hit the right-rear wheel of Moreno's car in the turn three right-hand corner. Moreno was sent into a spin while Takagi's suspension had broken and retired from the event. de Ferran and Tagliani made pit stops for fuel and tires during the caution and could reach the end of the race without a second pit stop. De Ferran and Tagliani rejoined in 14th and 15th places.

Castroneves led the field back up to speed at the lap-51 restart; he was followed by Fernández, Bräck and Dixon. Carpentier broke his rear wing after he collided with the turn one tire barrier when he locked his brakes and retired after it was discovered that his gearbox had sustained damage. Having restarted in seventh place, Andretti moved up into fourth position by lap 54. By the 60th lap, Castroneves had a 4.8 second lead over Fernández, who in turn was 3.5 seconds ahead of Bräck. Andretti was a further three seconds behind the Swedish driver, and was holding a two-second lead over Kanaan. Bräck went off at turn nine to retire with a mechanical issue that drained his car's battery on lap 63. Castroneves made a scheduled pit stop on lap 65, handing the lead to Fernández, and rejoined in tenth place. His car started to billow smoke after leaving turn one two laps later and pulled off to the side of the track at turn eight to retire. The seventh caution period was on the 68th lap to allow safety officials to remove Castroneves' car from the track. Most of the leaders (including Fernández) made pit stops to ensure they could reach the end of the race. Kanaan gained the lead and relinquished it to Andretti when he made a pit stop; Andretti led the field back up to speed at the lap-72 restart, followed by Tagliani.

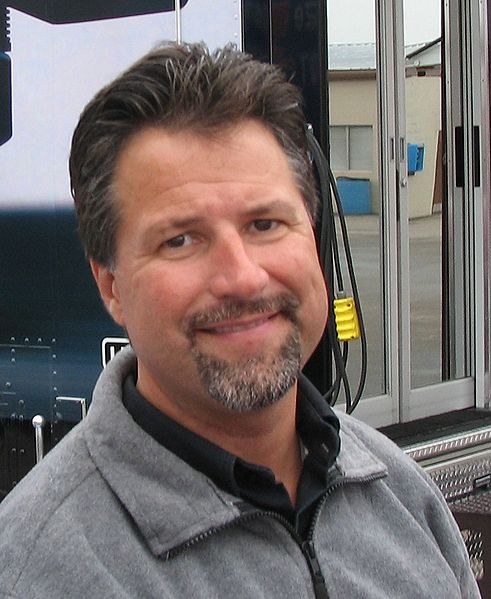
Michael Andretti (pictured in 2007) took the 41st victory of his career.

Gidley lost control of the rear-end of his car exiting turn 11 while accelerating and hit the outside wall which broke his right-front suspension on the same lap. He stopped on the frontstretch and retired from the race. Gidley was unhurt. The ninth period of yellow flags were shown on lap 73 to allow track officials to recover Gidley's damaged car. The race resumed on lap 76 with Andretti leading the field. The tenth caution was necessitated when de Ferran went to the inside of turn three and came across the front wing of da Matta. Jourdain was collected, and Kanaan spun to avoid the two drivers who temporarily blocked the track. De Ferran, da Matta and Jourdain retired, while Kanaan continued without damaging his car. Andretti retained his lead at the lap-79 restart, Fittipaldi was passed by Fernández for fourth position in the first turn. Zanardi moved from eighth to sixth by lap 82, while Fernández got ahead of Junqueira for third on the same lap. Between the 85th and 86th laps, Fittipaldi drove aggressively in an attempt to move in front of Junqueira for fourth but was unable to pass him.

Tagliani ran in sixth gear after his team ordered him to conserve fuel and was unable to generate enough heat into his tires to challenge Andretti on the restarts. On lap 87, Fittipaldi tried an overtaking manoeuvre on Junqueira around the outside of turn three which resulted in Fittipaldi and Junqueira making contact and both drivers slid into the outside tire barrier. Andretti's lead of 7.4 seconds was reduced to nothing when the eleventh (and final) caution was displayed on the next lap to allow course officials to extract Fittipaldi's and Junquiera's cars from the track. Racing resumed on lap 90 with Andretti retaining the first position and pulled away from the rest of the field. Fernández's radio had malfunctioned and was in another gear in an attempt to save fuel which allowed Tagliani to pass him for second. However, Tagliani was unable to close the gap to Andretti because of the presence of Junqueira's lapped car which cost him more than two seconds. He drove on the track's dirty side on the backstraight and his tires were cleaned in the next five turns on the track.

Kanaan ran out of fuel on the final lap; he stopped his car between turns three and four. Andretti's strategy of four pit stops did not require him to conserve fuel and maintained the lead to win the race. Tagliani finished second, Fernández took third, Zanardi fourth and Dixon fifth. Tracy, Gugelmin, Papis, Nakano and Kanaan rounded out the top ten. There were four lead changes in the race; five drivers reached the front of the field. De Ferran's total of 49 laps led was the highest of any competitor. There were eleven cautions (a new track record) during the race for 31 laps. The victory was Andretti's first (and only) win of the season, his seventh at Toronto (which surpassed the record of most wins in a CART event whom Andretti previously jointly held by Al Unser Jr. with six), and the 41st of his career. The attrition rate was high, with 11 of the 26 starters finishing the race.

=== Post-race ===
Andretti appeared in victory lane and later on the podium to celebrate his first victory of the season in front of the crowd; the win earned him $100,000. He was delighted to take the victory: "Just an awesome day, a perfect day for Team Motorola, they did an awesome job", and, "This is a big one, I'll tell you that. After the first lap, I thought the race was over for us. But it was a hard fought race". Tagliani, who finished in second place, stated it was a "good day" for his team and hoped he could continue his recent successes. Third-place finisher Fernández said it was a "great day" for himself and his team but was disappointed as he felt he could have won the race because of a problem at his final pit stop. However, he felt if his team kept building their momentum, and he believed he could challenge for more strong finishes and race victories. Zanardi was pleased with his fourth-place finish, saying it was more fun than at the previous round (the Grand Prix of Cleveland) and felt his engineers were helping him to build a competitive car despite his poor qualifying performances.

After his retirement from a mechanical failure, Bräck stated it affected his championship chances slightly and his retirement from the race was "something that you don't want to have happen but unfortunately it happens sometimes and today it was one of those days." Three days after the race, Tracy and Takagi was penalized by CART chief steward Chris Kneifel for "unjustifiable risk" and for causing several caution periods by contact with other competitors. Tracy had two championship points deducted and was placed on probation for the next three road or street course races, while Takagi also had two points removed and was put on probation for three events. Kneifel said why the penalties were issued:

We did not want to simply issue probations without accompanying them with a strong signal that actions like this will not be tolerated. Championship points are very hard-earned, and they're more valuable than money. We want our response to send out the very strong message that this isn't a slap on the wrist, or a token punishment.

The result meant Bräck remained the leader in the Drivers' Championship with 83 points, while Andretti's victory advanced him to second place. Castroneves' retirement dropped him to third place, five points ahead of Franchitti. De Ferran fell to fifth place with 58 points. In the Manufacturers' Championship, Honda maintained the lead with 158 points. Toyota remained in second with 142 points, 12 points ahead of Ford Cosworth. The race, which was broadcast live in the United States on ESPN, averaged 726,000 viewers, earning a 0.88 rating and a share of two. Andretti's victory was rated ninth in the top ten Indy Toronto races by the Toronto Star in 2015.

=== Race classification ===
Race results
Pos	No.	Driver	Team	Laps	Time/Retired	Grid	Points
1	39	Michael Andretti (USA)	Team Motorola	95	1:59:58.904	13	20
2	33	Alex Tagliani (CAN)	Forsythe Racing	95	+2.741	5	16
3	51	Adrián Fernández (MEX)	Fernández Racing	95	+4.395	7	14
4	66	Alex Zanardi (ITA)	Mo Nunn Racing	95	+4.901	25	12
5	18	Scott Dixon (NZL)	PacWest Racing	95	+5.604	10	10
6	26	Paul Tracy (CAN)	Team Green	95	+6.893	8	6
7	17	Maurício Gugelmin (BRA)	PacWest Racing	95	+8.136	19	6
8	7	Max Papis (ITA)	Team Rahal	95	+10.383	21	5
9	52	Shinji Nakano (JPN)	Fernández Racing	95	+15.816	26	4
10	55	Tony Kanaan (BRA)	Mo Nunn Racing	94	Out of Fuel	4	3
11	20	Roberto Moreno (BRA)	Patrick Racing	94	+1 Lap	9	2
12	11	Christian Fittipaldi (BRA)	Newman/Haas Racing	93	+2 Laps	14	1
13	4	Bruno Junqueira (BRA)	Chip Ganassi Racing	90	Contact	20	—
14	1	Gil de Ferran (BRA)	Team Penske	77	Contact	1	2^{1}
15	6	Cristiano da Matta (BRA)	Newman/Haas Racing	76	Contact	17	—
16	16	Michel Jourdain Jr. (MEX)	Bettenhausen Racing	76	Contact	18	—
17	12	Memo Gidley (USA)	Chip Ganassi Racing	71	Contact	23	—
18	77	Bryan Herta (USA)	Forysthe Racing	67	Electrical	15	—
19	3	Hélio Castroneves (BRA)	Team Penske	66	Mechanical	2	—
20	8	Kenny Bräck (SWE)	Team Rahal	61	Electrical	3	—
21	32	Patrick Carpentier (CAN)	Forsythe Racing	52	Contact	12	—
22	5	Toranosuke Takagi (JPN)	Walker Racing	46	Contact	22	—
23	22	Oriol Servià (ESP)	Sigma Autosport	40	Contact	11	—
24	27	Dario Franchitti (GBR)	Team Green	31	Oil Leak	6	—
25	25	Max Wilson (BRA)	Arciero-Blair Racing	31	Contact	25	—
26	40	Jimmy Vasser (USA)	Patrick Racing	4	Contact	4	—

Notes

- ^1— Includes two bonus points for being the fastest qualifier and for leading the most laps.

== Standings after the race ==
Drivers' Championship standings
Rank	+/–	Driver	Points
1		Kenny Bräck (SWE)	83
2	4	Michael Andretti (USA)	73 (−10)
3	1	Hélio Castroneves (BRA)	70 (−13)
4	1	Dario Franchitti (GBR)	65 (−18)
5	1	Gil de Ferran (BRA)	58 (−25)

Constructors' standings
Rank	+/–	Constructor	Points
1		Reynard (UK)	173
2		Lola (UK)	152 (−21)

Manufacturers' standings
Rank	+/–	Manufacturer	Points
1		Honda (JPN)	158
2		Toyota (JPN)	142 (−16)
3		Ford Cosworth (UK)	130 (−28)

- Note: Only the top five positions are included for the drivers' standings.

Previous race: 2001 Marconi Grand Prix of Cleveland	CART FedEx Championship Series; 2001 season	Next race: 2001 Harrah's 500
Previous race: 2000 Molson Indy Toronto	Molson Indy Toronto	Next race: 2002 Molson Indy Toronto
