= Memo Gidley =

Mexican and American racing driver (born 1970)

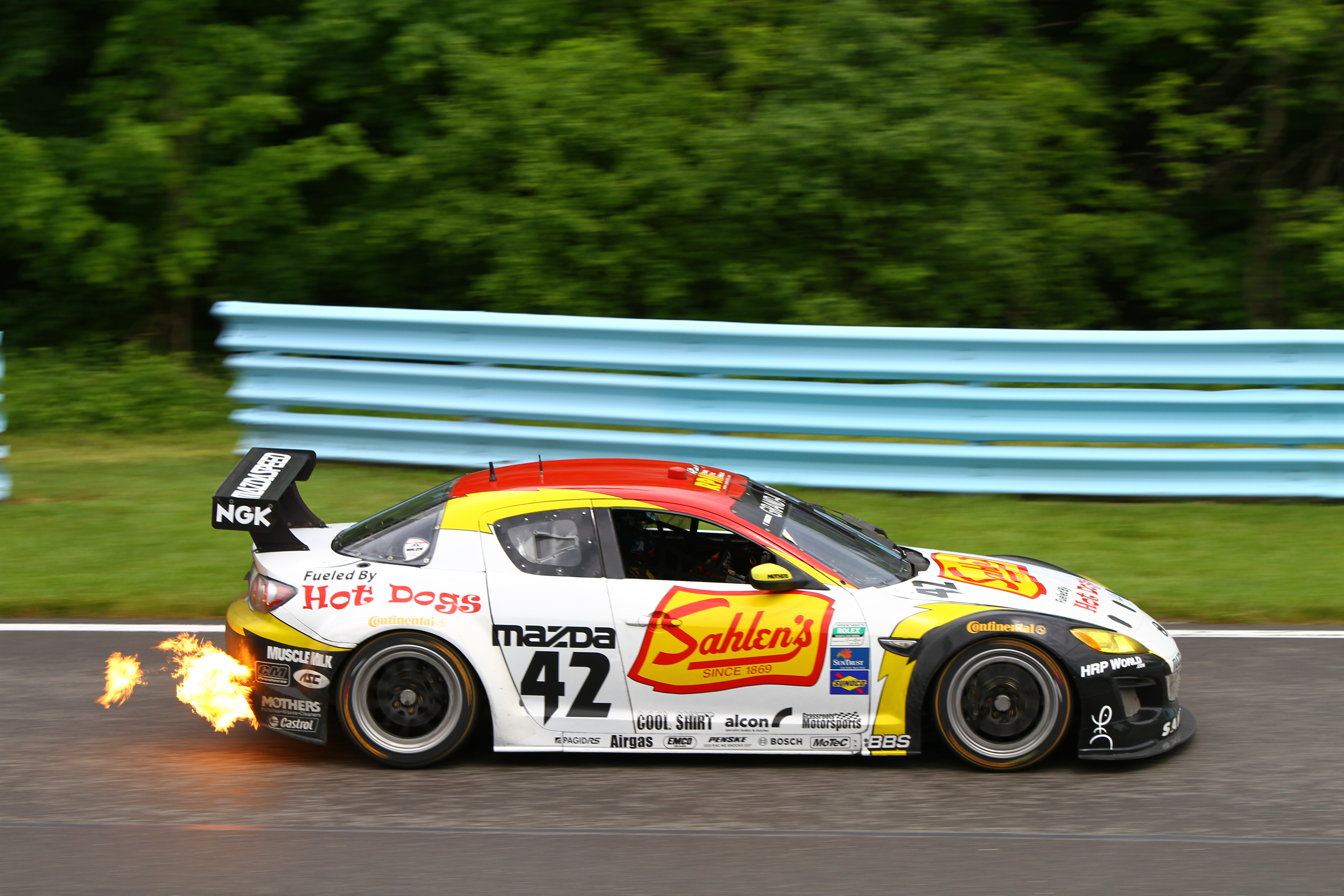
- Mazda RX-8 driven by Memo Gidley in 2011
- Nationality: (Mexico) Mexican (United States) American
- Born: September 29, 1970 (age 56) La Paz, Baja California Sur, Mexico

GT America Series career
- Debut season: 2023
- Current team: TKO Motorsports with Flying Lizard
- Categorisation: FIA Gold (until 2017); FIA Silver (2018–2019); FIA Bronze (2020–)
- Car number: 101
- Starts: 18
- Championships: 1
- Wins: 8
- Podiums: 15
- Best finish: 1st in 2023

Previous series
- 1999–2004 2000–2002 1999–2012 2014 2022: Champ Car; Indy Racing League; American Le Mans Series; IMSA SportsCar Championship; IMSA Prototype Challenge

Championship titles
- 2023: GT America Series (SRO3)

Awards
- 1995: Team USA Scholarship

José Guillermo "Memo" Gidley (born September 29, 1970) is a Mexican and American racing driver, who competed in IndyCar from 1999 to 2004 and Daytona Prototypes from 2005 to 2014.

Gidley worked at the Jim Russell Racing School as a mechanic to fund his career for some time, eventually getting a chance in CART with Walker Racing in 1999 as a short-term replacement. Gidley joined Chip Ganassi Racing in mid-2001. He nearly took victory at Cleveland and, despite a serious crash at Road America, finished the season with two more podiums. He nearly retained his drive for 2002 — Ganassi later opted to keep Bruno Junqueira instead.

Gidley primarily raced sports cars then, but he made two Champ Car starts for Rocketsports in 2004 and briefly ran in the rival IRL series. In 2005, he competed full-time in the Grand-Am Rolex Sports Car Series, co-driving with Michael McDowell to victory in the Mexico City season finale. He then raced the Team Playboy cars, partnered Max Angelelli at SunTrust Racing, and spent three seasons at Doran. In the 2010 American Le Mans Series, Gidley co-drove CytoSport's Porsche RS Spyder with Klaus Graf and Sascha Maassen to second in LMP1 at Laguna Seca.

During the 2014 24 Hours of Daytona, Gidley suffered serious injuries when his Corvette DP slammed into the back of a Ferrari 458 Italia GT2 driven by Matteo Malucelli. Malucelli's car had lost power and rolled to a near stop on the track when Gidley hit him at approximately 120 miles per hour (190 km/h). Gidley was taken by ambulance to Halifax Health Medical Center, where doctors diagnosed him with a broken back, injuries to his left arm and leg, and a concussion. Gidley underwent three surgeries before being released from the hospital 11 days after the accident. After five further surgeries and three years of recovering from his injuries, Gidley made his return to racing in September 2017.

In 2022, Gidley drove a Duqueine D-08 LMP3 full-time in the IMSA Prototype Challenge, and won at Mid-Ohio en route to runner-up honours. Gidley raced in GT America Series in 2023, and won the SRO3 (GT3) championship with 8 wins. In the 2025–26 Asian Le Mans Series at Abu Dhabi, Gidley suffered another major crash after the Ferrari he was driving was clipped by Michael Jensen's LMP2. He was unharmed.

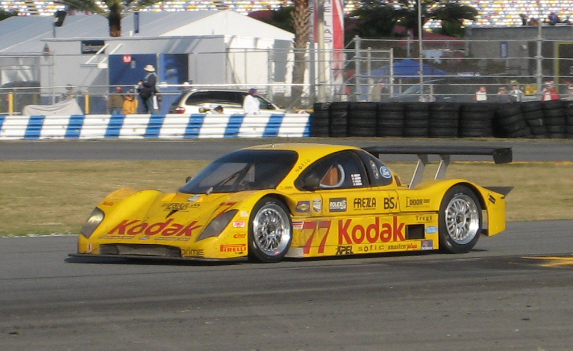
Gidley's Kodak-backed Doran Racing Dallara DP01 at Daytona in 2008.

== Motorsports career results ==
=== American Open-Wheel racing results ===
(key)

==== Complete USF2000 National Championship results ====
Year	Entrant	1	2	3	4	5	6	7	8	9	10	Pos	Points
1995	Cape Motorsports	PIR1; 46	PIR2; 1	**IRP**; 1	RIR; 4	WGI; 43	MOH1; 1	NHS; 2	ATL1; 6	**ATL2**; 2	**MOH1**; 7	**2nd**	**196**

==== Atlantic Championship ====
Year	Team	1	2	3	4	5	6	7	8	9	10	11	12	13	Rank	Points
1997	Lynx Racing	HMS; 2	LBH; 7	NAZ; 26	MIL; 3	MTL; 3	CLE; 9	TOR; 1	TRR; 5	MOH; 4	ROA; 5	**VAN**; 1	LS; 25		**2nd**	**136**
1998	Lynx Racing	LBH; 1	NAZ; 4	GAT; 1	**MIL**; 1	MTL; 32	**CLE**; 26	TOR; 6	TRR; 4	MOH; 27	ROA; 2	VAN; 7	LS; 22	HOU; 5	**3rd**	**134**

==== CART/Champ Car World Series ====
Year	Team	No.	Chassis	Engine	1	2	3	4	5	6	7	8	9	10	11	12	13	14	15	16	17	18	19	20	21	Rank	Points	Ref
1999	Walker Racing	15	Reynard 99i	Honda HRS V8t	MIA	MOT	LBH	NZR	RIO	STL	MIL	POR; 19	CLE; 11	ROA; 26	TOR; 12	MIC										27th	**4**	
1999	Payton/Coyne Racing	71	Lola B99/00	Ford XD V8t													DET; 20	MOH; 22	CHI	VAN; 12	LS; 13	HOU; 14	SRF; 14	FON		27th	**4**	
2000	Player's Forsythe Racing	32	Reynard 2Ki	Ford XF V8t	MIA	LBH; 21	RIO; 8	MOT; 18	NZR	MIL	DET	POR	CLE	TOR												20th	**20**	
2000	Della Penna Motorsports	10	Reynard 2Ki	Toyota RV8E V8t											MIC; 10	CHI; 10	MOH; 12	ROA; 6	VAN; 16	LS; 19	STL; 22	HOU; 21	SRF	FON; 21		20th	**20**	
2001	Chip Ganassi Racing	12	Lola B01/00	Toyota RV8F V8t	MTY	LBH	TXS	NZR	MOT	MIL	DET	POR; 25	CLE; 2*	TOR; 17	MIC; 14	CHI; 5	MOH; 11	ROA; 20	VAN; 10	LAU; 14	ROC; 18	HOU; 3	LS; 2	SRF; 10	FON; 14	17th	**65**	
2004	Rocketsports	17	Lola B02/00	Ford XFE V8t	LBH	MTY	MIL	POR	CLE	TOR; 16	VAN; 11	ROA	DEN	MTL	LS	LVS	SRF	MXC								21st	**15**^	

- ^ New points system implemented in 2004

==== Indy Racing League ====
Year	Team	No.	Chassis	Engine	1	2	3	4	5	6	7	8	9	10	11	12	13	14	15	Rank	Points	Ref
2000	Team Pelfrey	82	Dallara IR-00	Oldsmobile Aurora V8	WDW	PHX	LVS	INDY; DNQ	TXS	PPIR	ATL	KTY	TX2							NC	-	
2001	Brayton Racing	61	Dallara IR-01	Oldsmobile Aurora V8	PHX	HMS	ATL	INDY; DNQ	TXS	PPIR	RIR	KAN	NSH	KTY	STL	CHI	TX2			NC	-	
2002	Dreyer & Reinbold Racing	24	G-Force GF05C	Infiniti VRH35ADE V8	HMS	PHX	FON; 21	NZR												**46th**	**9**	
2002	Duesenberg Brothers Racing	32	Dallara IR-02	Chevrolet Indy V8					INDY; DNQ	TXS	PPIR	RIR	KAN	NSH	MIS	KTY	STL	CHI	TX2	**46th**	**9**	

==== Indy 500 results ====
Year	Chassis	Engine	Start	Finish	Team
2000	Dallara	Oldsmobile	DNQ		Team Pelfrey
2001	Dallara	Oldsmobile	DNQ		Brayton Racing
2002	Dallara	Chevrolet	DNQ		Duesenberg Brothers Racing

=== Complete American Le Mans Series results ===
Year	Entrant	Class	Chassis	Engine	Tyres	1	2	3	4	5	6	7	8	9	10	11	12	Rank	Points
1999	Panoz Motor Sports	LMP	Panoz LMP-1 Roadster-S	Ford (Élan-Yates) 6.0 L V8	M	SEB	ATL	MOS	SON	POR	PET ovr:5 cls:5	MON	LSV					63rd	15
2006	Highcroft Racing	LMP1	MG-Lola EX257	AER P07 2.0L Turbo I4	D	SEB	TEX	MID	LIM	UTA	POR	AME	MOS	PET ovr:3 cls:3	MON			20th	19
2007	Team Cytosport	LMP1	Lola B06/10	AER P32T 4.0L Turbo V8	D	SEB	STP	LNB	TEX	UTA	LIM	MID	AME	MOS	DET	PET ovr:14 cls:3	MON	20th	19
2010	Muscle Milk Team CytoSport	LMP	Porsche RS Spyder Evo	Porsche MR6 3.4 L V8	M	SEB	LNB	MON ovr:2 cls:2	UTA	LIM	MID	AME	MOS	PET				NC	-
2012	Muscle Milk Pickett Racing	PC	Oreca FLM09	Chevrolet LS3 6.2 L V8	M	SEB ovr:42 cls:5	LNB ovr:4 cls:2	MON ovr:6 cls:4	LIM	MOS	MID	AME	BAL	VIR	PET			12th	40

* Season still in progress.

=== WeatherTech SportsCar Championship results ===
(key)(Races in bold indicate pole position, Results are overall/class)

Year	Team	Class	Make	Engine	1	2	3	4	5	6	7	8	9	10	11	Rank	Points	Ref
2014	GAINSCO/Bob Stallings Racing	P	Riley Corvette DP	Chevrolet 5.5L V8	DAY; 18	SEB	LBH	LAG	DET	WGL	MOS	IMS	ROA	COA	PET	56th	14	
