= 2000 Marlboro Grand Prix of Miami =

(United States) 2000 Marlboro Grand Prix Miami
Race details
- Race 1 of 20 in the 2000 CART season
- Homestead-Miami Speedway
- Date: March 26, 2000
- Official name: Marlboro Grand Prix of Miami
- Location: Homestead–Miami Speedway, Homestead, Florida, United States
- Course: Permanent oval course 1.5 mi / 2.4 km
- Distance: 150 laps 225 mi / 360 km
- Weather: Dry

Pole position
- Driver: (Brazil) Gil de Ferran (Team Penske)

Fastest lap
- Driver: (Colombia) Juan Pablo Montoya (Chip Ganassi Racing)
- Time: (on lap of 150)

Podium
- First: (Italy) Max Papis (Team Rahal)
- Second: (United States) Roberto Moreno (Patrick Racing)
- Third: (Canada) Paul Tracy (Team KOOL Green)

The 2000 Marlboro Grand Prix of Miami presented by Toyota was the first round of the 2000 CART FedEx Championship Series, held March 26, 2000, on the Homestead–Miami Speedway in Homestead, Florida.

The race winner was Max Papis, his first Champ Car victory. This was the final CART-sanctioned event at Homestead. The event would go to the rival Indy Racing League for 2001 through 2010.

== Final results ==
1. Max Papis
2. Roberto Moreno
3. Paul Tracy
4. Jimmy Vasser
5. Patrick Carpentier
6. Gil de Ferran
7. Christian Fittipaldi
8. Shinji Nakano
9. Alex Tagliani
10. Tony Kanaan +1 lap
11. Dario Franchitti +1 lap
12. Cristiano da Matta + 1 lap
13. Mark Blundell +2 laps
14. Michel Jourdain Jr. +3 laps
15. Norberto Fontana +3 laps
16. Maurício Gugelmin +4 laps
17. Luiz Garcia Jr Crash
18. Kenny Brack Oil Leak
19. Oriol Servià transmission
20. Gualter Salles transmission
21. Adrián Fernández Oil Leak
22. Michael Andretti Oil Pressure
23. Juan Pablo Montoya Engine
24. Takuya Kurosawa Electrical
25. Hélio Castroneves Electrical
