= Luiz Garcia Jr. =

Brazilian race car driver (born 1971)

Luiz Garcia Jr
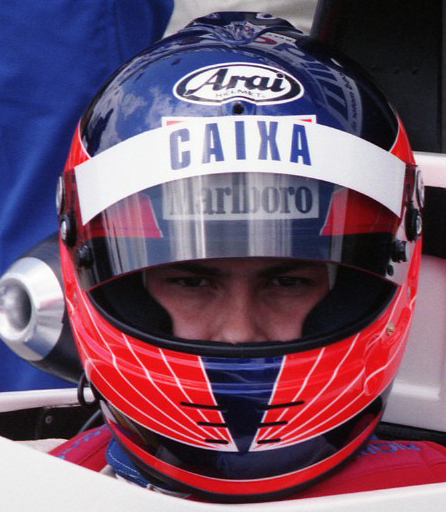
- Born: May 4, 1971 (age 55); Brasília, Brazil

Luiz Garcia Jr. (born May 4, 1971) is a Brazilian race car driver.

== Biography ==
Garcia was born in Brasília. He began his racing career in karting, where he won three Brazilian titles (1986, 1987, 1988) and two runner-ups. He raced in the Brazilian Formula Ford 1600 in 1990 and 1991, in which he would become champion in his sophomore season, and British Formula Vauxhall in 1992 (tenth) and 1993 (championship runner up, three wins, two poles).

In 1994 and 1995, Garcia raced on European Formula 3. He then raced in the Indy Lights series in 1997 and 1998 finishing 13th and 12th in series points in his two seasons, capturing a single win in 1998 at Cleveland.

Garcia made his CART debut at the 1999 season opener at Homestead-Miami Speedway for Dale Coyne Racing. After seven races with Coyne he moved to Hogan Racing where he made three more starts. In 2000 he returned and ran a full season in the No. 25 Arciero Project Racing Group Reynard-Mercedes sponsored by Brazilian companies Hollywood and Embratel. He scored six points, good enough for 27th in the championship, with a best finish of 11th at the Michigan 500.

Garcia returned for the first two races of the 2001 season with Coyne before poor finishes and a lack of funding ended his CART career. He has not driven in a major professional auto race since his last CART appearance.

== Racing record ==
=== British F3 Championship ===
Year	Team	1	2	3	4	5	6	7	8	9	10	11	12	13	14	15	16	17	18	Rank	Points
1994	Edenbridge Racing	SIL; 12	DON; 2	BRH; 10	BRH; Ret	SIL; 9	SIL; 12	BRH; 12	THR; DNS	OUL; 10	DON; 8	SIL; 8	SNE; 9	PEM; 12	PEM; 12	SIL; 9	SIL; 10	THR; 8	SIL; Ret	11th	34
1995	David Sears Motorsport	SIL; NC	SIL; 18	THR; 15	THR; Ret	DON; 17	SIL; 10	SIL; 10	DON; 14	DON; 10	OUL; 14	BRH; Ret	BRH; Ret	SNE; 4	PEM; Ret	PEM; Ret	SIL; 17	SIL; 11	THR; 8	15th	16

=== British F3000 Championship ===
Year	Team	1	2	3	4	5	6	7	8	9	10	Rank	Points
1996	Super Nova Racing	OUL; Ret	SNE; 2	SNE; 2	SIL; 2	Oul; Ret	DON; 3	BHI; 2	SIL; 2	BHI; 1	DON; 1	2nd	52

=== American open-wheel racing results ===
(key)

==== Indy Lights ====
Year	Team	1	2	3	4	5	6	7	8	9	10	11	12	13	14	Rank	Points	Ref
1997	Dorricott Racing	HMS; 16	LBH; 15	NAZ; 24	SAV; 4	GAT; 17	MIL; 19	DET; 9	POR; 6	TOR; 25	TRO; 23	VAN; 6	LAG; 10	FON; 10		13th	38	
1998	Johansson Motorsports	HMS; 22	LBH; 10		GAT; 20	MIL; 11	DET; 21	POR; 3	CLE; 1	TOR; 11	MIC; 15	TRO; 12	VAN; 16	LAG; 6	FON; 6	12th	60	

CART

Year	Team	1	2	3	4	5	6	7	8	9	10	11	12	13	14	15	16	17	18	19	20	21	Rank	Points	Ref
1999	Payton/Coyne Racing	MIA; 24	MOT; 19	LBH; 24	NZR	RIO; 18	STL	MIL	POR; 23	CLE; 14	ROA; 24	TOR	MIS	DET									34th	0	
1999	Hogan Racing														MDO; 24	CHI; DNS	VAN; 16	LS; 15	HOU; DNS	SRF	FON		34th	0	
2000	Arciero Racing	MIA; 17	LBH; 12	RIO; 12	MOT; 23	NZR; 15	MIL; 21	DET; 22	POR; 14	CLE; 20	TOR; 12	MIS; 11	CHI; 17	MDO; 25	ROA; 24	VAN; 15	LS; 20	STL; 25	HOU; 22	SRF; 12	FON; DNS		27th	6	
2001	Dale Coyne Racing	MTY; 26	LBH; 27	TXS	NZR	MOT	MIL	DET	POR	CLE	TOR	MIS	CHI	MDO	ROA	VAN	LAU	ROC	HOU	LS	SRF	FON	32nd	0	

== Gallery ==
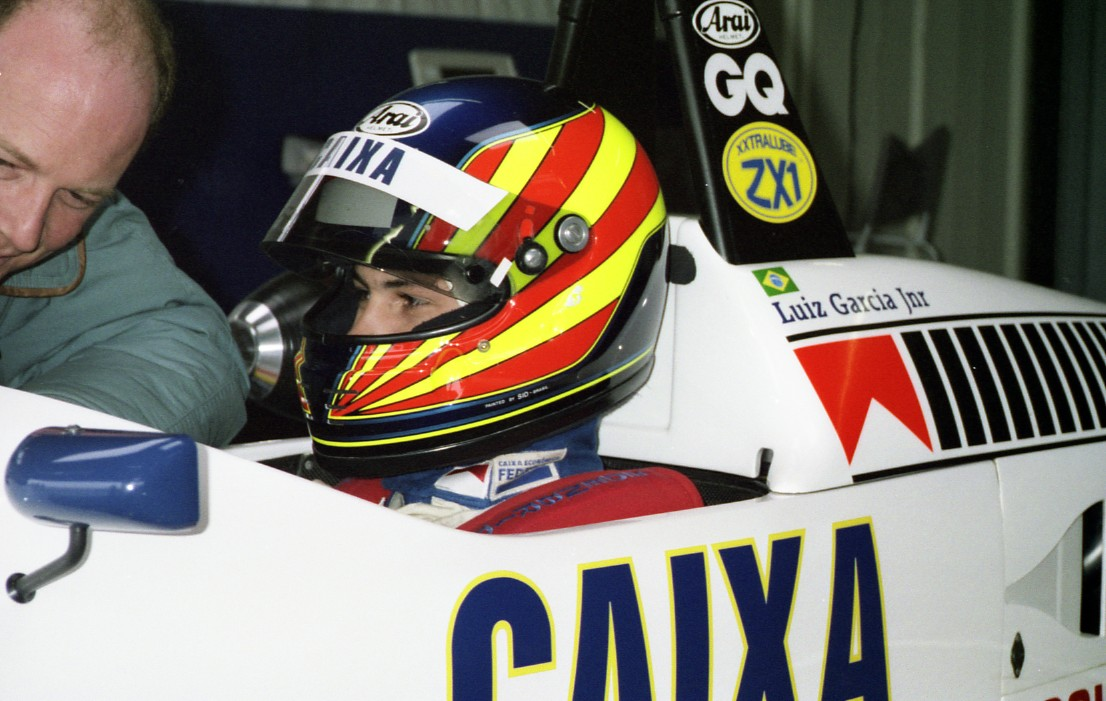
Luiz Garcia Jr, Silverstone, British F3, 1994

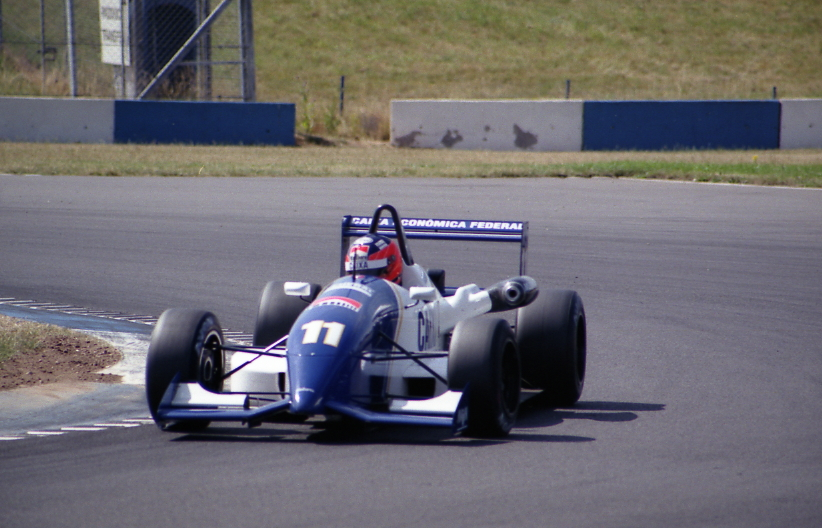
Luiz Garcia Jr, Donington, British F3, 1995

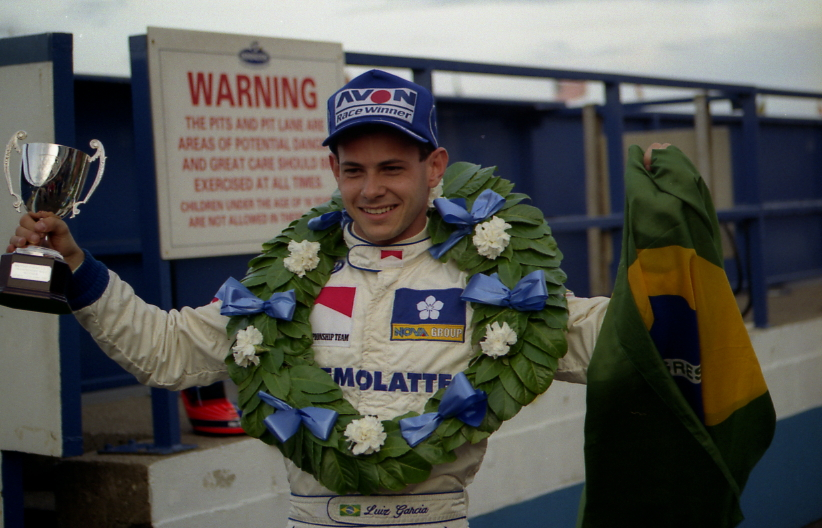
Luiz Garcia Jr, Donington, British F3000, 1996

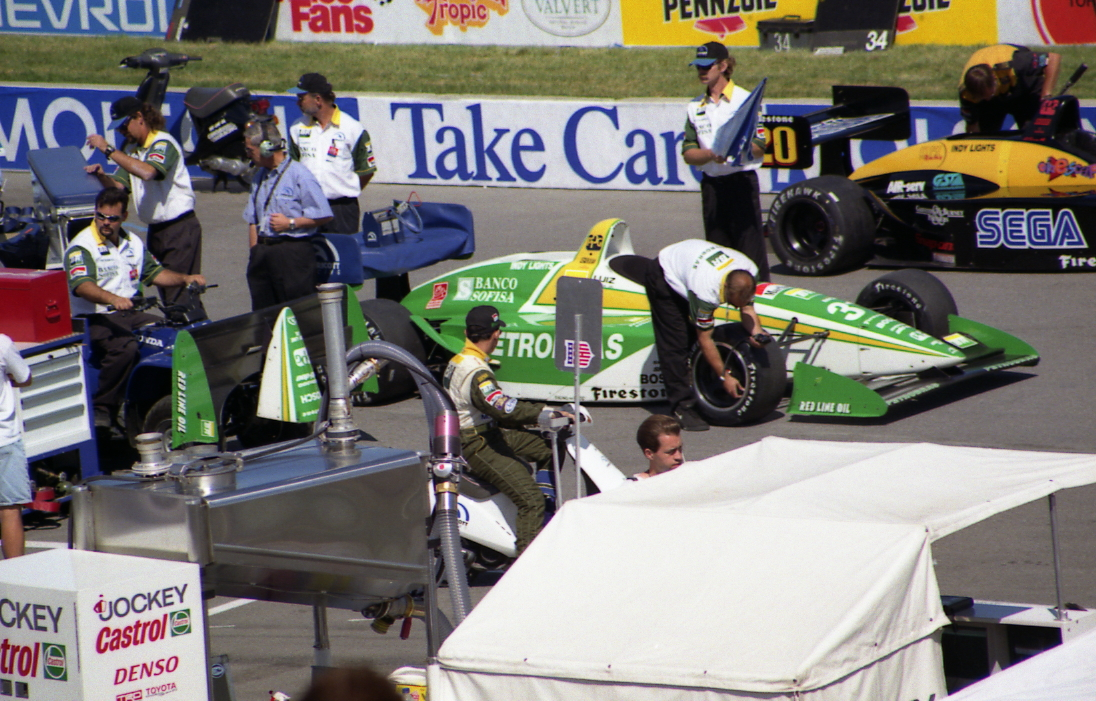
Luiz Garcia Jr, Toronto, Indy Lights, 1997

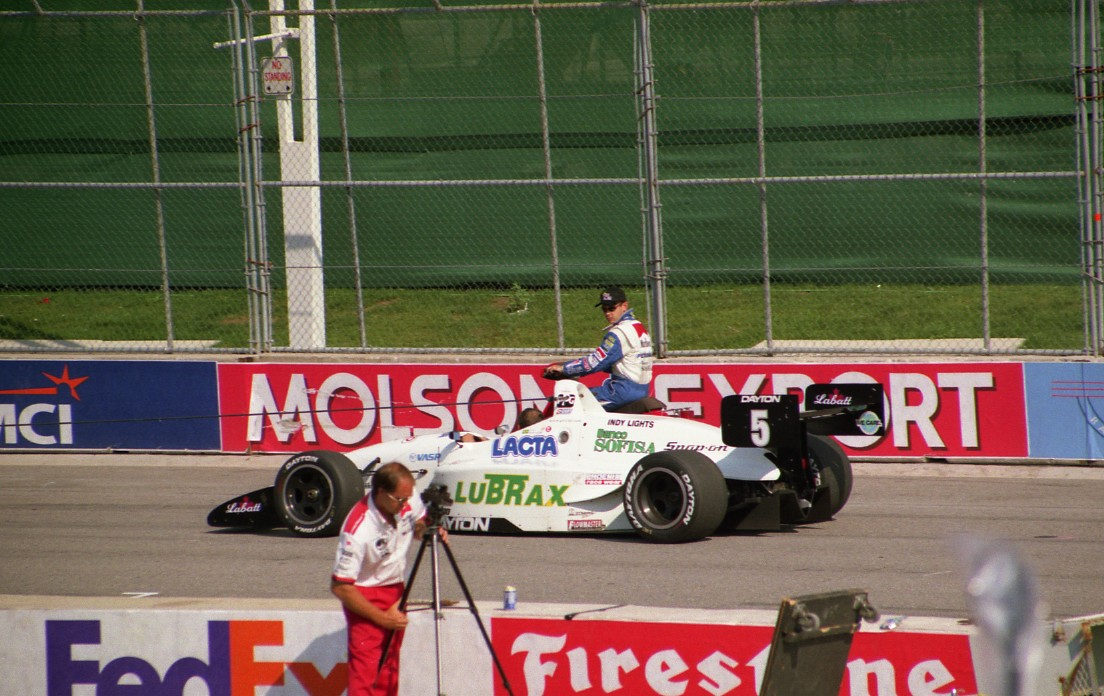
Luiz Garcia Jr, Toronto, Indy Lights, 1998

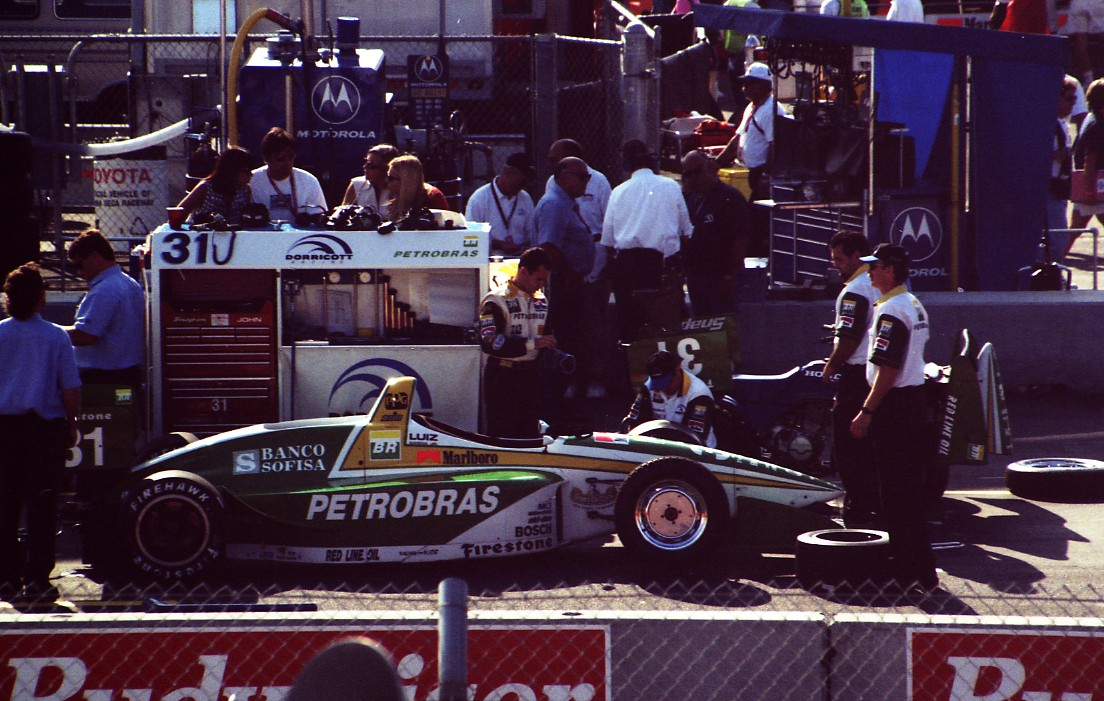
Luiz Garcia Jr, Laguna Seca, Indy Lights, 1998

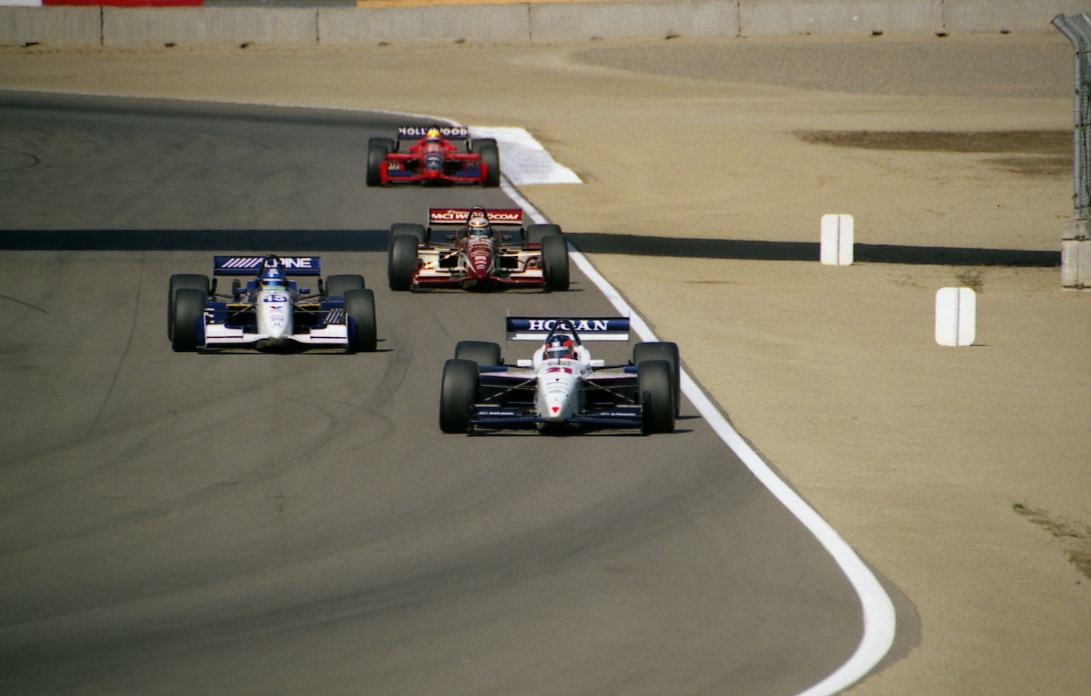
Luiz Garcia Jr, Laguna Seca, Champ Car, 1999

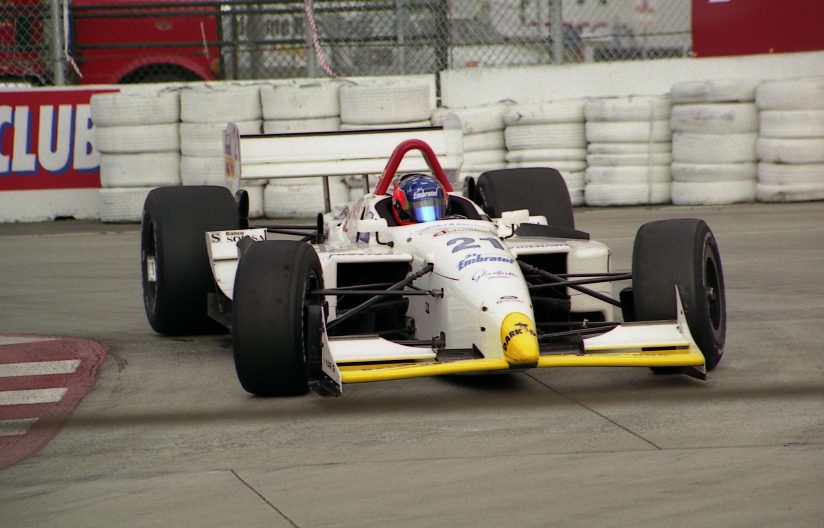
Luiz Garcia Jr, Long Beach, Champ Car, 2001
