= Kenny Bräck =

Swedish racing driver (born 1966)

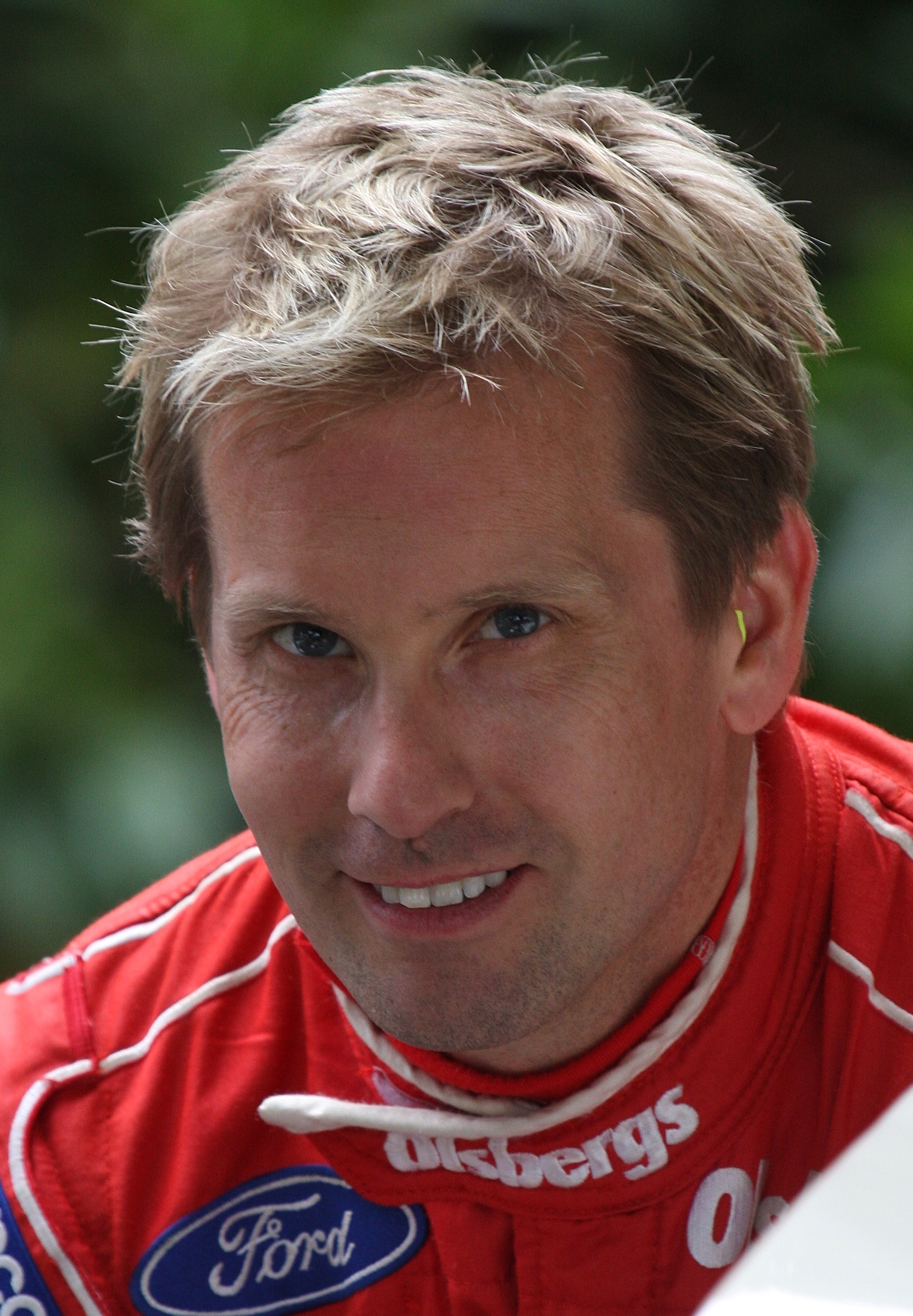
- Bräck at the 2011 Goodwood Festival of Speed
- Nationality: Swedish
- Born: Per Cenny Bräck; 21 March 1966 (age 60) Arvika, Sweden
- Retired: 2005

IRL IndyCar Series
- Years active: 1997–99, 2002–03, 2005
- Teams: Rahal Letterman Racing; Chip Ganassi Racing; A. J. Foyt Enterprises; Galles Racing
- Starts: 47
- Wins: 4
- Poles: 0
- Best finish: 1st in 1998

Previous series
- 2000–2002 1994–1995 1993: CART World Series; Formula 3000; Barber Saab Pro Series

Championship titles
- 1999 1998 1993: Indianapolis 500 winner Indy Racing League champion Barber Saab Pro Series champion

Awards
- 2005 2000: Scott Brayton award CART Rookie of the Year

IndyCar Series career
- 46 races run over 6 years
- 2005 position: 34th
- Best finish: 1st (1998)
- First race: 1997 Phoenix 200 (Phoenix)
- Last race: 2005 Indianapolis 500 (Indianapolis)
- First win: 1998 VisionAire 500K (Charlotte)
- Last win: 1999 Indianapolis 500 (Indianapolis)
Wins	Podiums	Poles
4	9	0

Champ Car career
- 59 races run over 3 years
- Years active: 2000–2002
- Teams: Team Rahal; Chip Ganassi Racing
- Best finish: 2nd (2001)
- First race: 2000 Marlboro Grand Prix of Miami (Homestead)
- Last race: 2002 Gran Premio Telmex-Gigante (Autódromo Hermanos Rodríguez)
- First win: 2001 Firestone Firehawk 500 (Motegi)
- Last win: 2002 Gran Premio Telmex-Gigante(Autódromo Hermanos Rodríguez)
Wins	Podiums	Poles
5	13	7

Per Cenny "Kenny" Bräck (born 21 March 1966) is a Swedish former race car driver. Until his retirement from racing, he competed in the CART, Indy Racing League and the IROC series. He won the 1998 Indy Racing League championship and the 1999 Indianapolis 500, becoming the first Swedish driver to win the race.

Bräck survived one of the racing sport's biggest crashes at Texas Motor Speedway in 2003, where he recorded the highest horizontal g-force ever survived by a human being at 214 g_{0}. Eighteen months later he made a comeback at the Indy 500 and set the fastest qualifying time of the field. He retired from IndyCar racing after the race.

In 2009, Bräck made a comeback to rally, competing in Rally X at X-Games 15 and winning Gold. Bräck no longer races, his last win being The Dukerie's Stage Rally in Nottingham, England with co-driver Emil Axelsson in June 2011. The duo also won the Swedish classic The Midnight Sun Rally in July 2011. In September of that year, Bräck took pole position and won the RAC Tourist Trophy race at the Goodwood Revival in a Shelby Daytona Coupé 1964 together with nine-time 24 Hours of Le Mans winner Tom Kristensen. In September 2013, Bräck won The Whitsun Trophy race at the Goodwood Revival in a Ford GT40 together with Red Bull Racing's Adrian Newey.

== Early career ==
Born in Arvika, Sweden, he grew up in the small village of Glava, where his father taught him to drive cars on the lake-ice in the winters. A neighbor introduced Bräck to racing when he was thirteen years of age, working in his business one summer, buying him a go-kart. Apart from the beginning of Bräck's career, he has managed his career himself, from finding sponsors, negotiating contracts to winning races.

== Formula racing ==
Bräck raced in Britain and Sweden in Formula Ford and Formula 3 (he was Swedish junior Formula Ford Champion in 1986), in Europe in Formula Opel Lotus and the Renault Clio Cup (Scandinavian Champion 1992) and in the US in the Barber Saab Pro Series (Champion in 1993).

In 1994, Bräck competed in the International Formula 3000. In 1995, he finished third in the International F3000 championship for Madgwick Racing. In 1996, he was Arrows Formula One test driver but decided to leave the team after mid season concentrating on his European F3000 campaign. Despite winning the last race on the road, after a controversial Clerk of the Course decision he eventually was disqualified from the event and had to settle for the runner-up position in the championship, driving for the British team Super Nova. Had he not been disqualified, Bräck would have been champion.

== First IRL stint ==
Bräck debuted in the IRL in 1997, making his first start for Galles Racing at Phoenix, replacing Jeff Ward, and finishing eleventh after an accident. Over seven starts, he had two top-five finishes at Charlotte and New Hampshire.

Leading up to his Indianapolis 500 debut in 1997, Bräck showed initial promise early in May. He posted the fastest time on the second day of Rookie Orientation, posting a lap speed of 205.597 mph. He ended up qualifying fifteenth for the race, in a unique year in which 35 cars formed the starting grid. Unfortunately, on Race Day, in the final pace lap before the green flag, Bräck was caught up in an accident with Stéphan Grégoire and Affonso Giaffone and finished 33rd after being unable to continue.

In 1998, Bräck moved to drive for American racing legend A. J. Foyt. The new team paid dividends, as he won three consecutive races on his way to the IRL championship in 1998. In his 1999 title defense, he finished runner-up to Greg Ray, including a win at the 1999 Indianapolis 500. After the 1999 season, he left Foyt's team to compete in the CART FedEx Championship Series.

== CART career ==
Kenny Bräck

CART World Series
- Years active: 2000–2002
- Teams: Team Rahal; Chip Ganassi Racing
- Starts: 59
- Wins: 5
- Poles: 7
- Best finish: 2nd in 2001

Awards
- 2000: CART Rookie of the Year

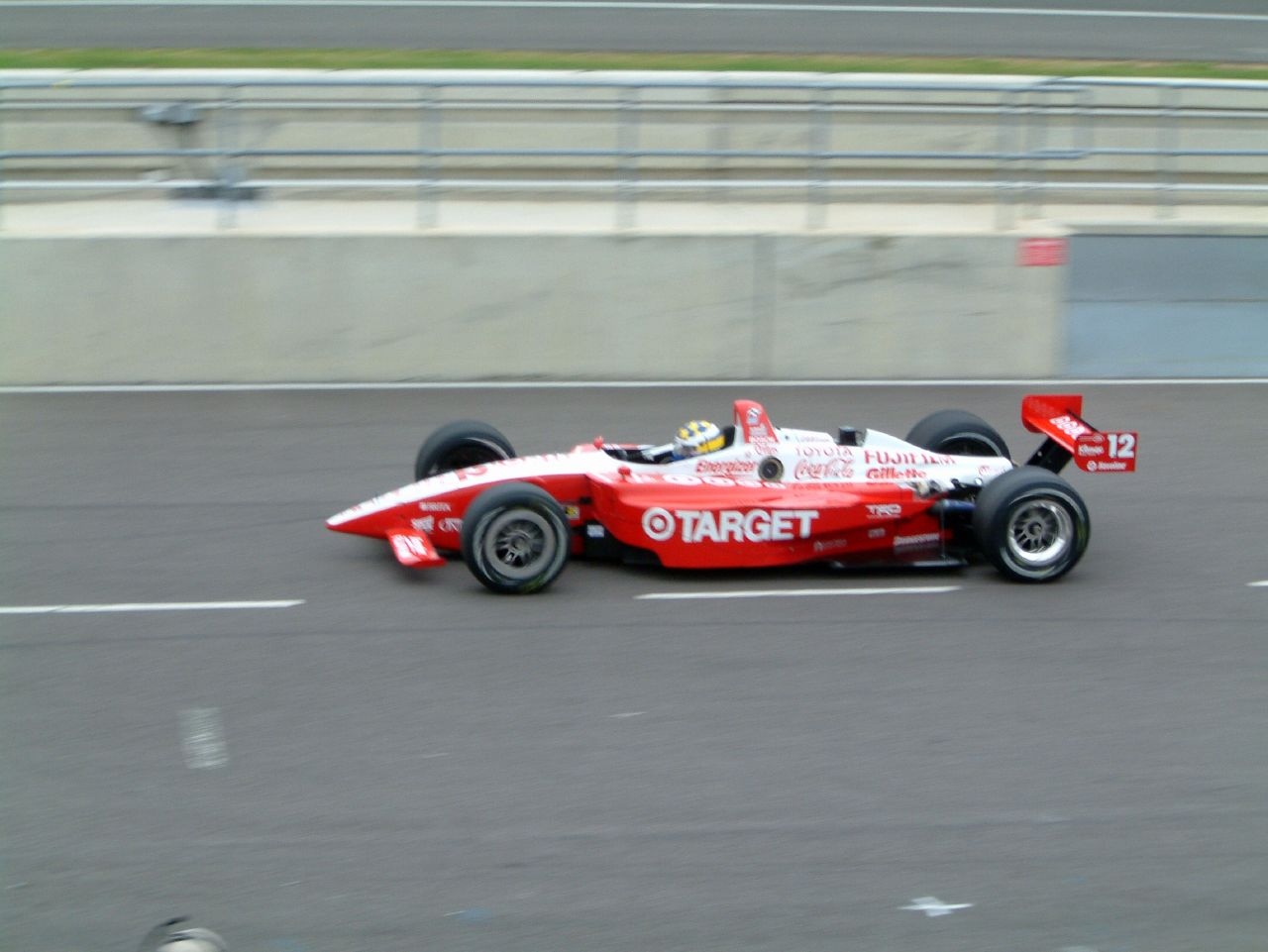
Kenny Bräck in 2002.

In 2000, Bräck switched to the CART series, joining Team Rahal and being awarded the Rookie of the Year, finishing fourth in the overall standings.

In 2001, Bräck finished second in the driver's championship, winning a season-high four races and taking six pole positions. However, he did not have much success on road circuits which is what ultimately cost him that year's title to Gil de Ferran.

In 2001, Bräck also had a minor role in the Hollywood motion picture Driven, which starred Sylvester Stallone and Burt Reynolds.

In 2002, Bräck raced for Chip Ganassi Racing, and he ended the season by winning the CART season finale Mexico City G.P., which turned out to be his only win in major North American open-wheel racing on a road or street circuit.

== IROC ==
In 2001, Bräck competed in the International Race of Champions series in the season called IROC XXV. The series is a stock car invitational in the United States. He finished third in the championship, the highest points position for a non-stock car driver.

== Return to IRL ==
Bräck moved back to the IRL in 2003 with previous CART team owner, Bobby Rahal and his Rahal Letterman Racing team. Bräck finished second place at the Twin Ring Motegi circuit in Japan. In the final race at Texas Motor Speedway, he suffered a serious crash that almost cost him his life. His car locked wheels with Tomas Scheckter's, flew into the catch fencing, and broke apart leaving the cockpit still intact. Bräck's crash saw the highest recorded g-forces since the introduction of crash violence recording systems, peaking at 214 g (while death may occur at >50 g). He suffered multiple fractures, breaking his sternum, femur, shattering a vertebra in his spine and crushing his ankles. He spent eighteen months recovering from his injuries. Though Bräck would return for one additional race, the Texas wreck essentially ended his racing career in IRL.

Bräck made his comeback at the 2005 Indianapolis 500, replacing an injured Buddy Rice (who, coincidentally, had replaced Bräck in 2004). He set the fastest qualification time in the field with an average speed of 227.598 mph (366.283 km/h), but started 23rd due to not qualifying on the first day. He retired from the race with a mechanical problem, finishing in 26th place.

== Retirement ==
As of 2011, Bräck lives in England and has retired from open wheel racing. Since 2015, Bräck has helped McLaren Automotive working with dynamic car development for their road cars. In May 2018, he took the role as chief test driver. In May 2017 Kenny set the lap record for road legal cars at the Nürburgring Nordschleife with a lap time of 6'43.22, in a McLaren P1 LM, a project he helped develop with Team Lanzante. He continued to occasionally drive in rallying.

For a time, Bräck managed future Formula One and IndyCar driver Marcus Ericsson, who became the second Swede after Bräck to win the Indianapolis 500 in 2022.

Bräck also spends his time currently as the lead member and songwriter of his rock band "Bräck", together with lead singer Franc Aledia. At the 2007 Indianapolis 500 the band Bräck cooperated with the Indianapolis Motor Speedway in celebrating American racing legend A. J. Foyt as part of his 50th anniversary at the Indianapolis Motor Speedway. In May 2007 the band released its first album "Greatest hits, volume 1" featuring the song "Legend of the Speedway". A rock video, featuring Foyt's Indianapolis winning cars including the car Bräck won the race with in 1999 while driving for Foyt was also recorded. The video was directed by Allen Farst of Niche Productions, Dayton, Ohio.

Bräck is also on the board of directors of Mekonomen, Scandinavia's biggest distributor of car spare parts, listed on the Swedish stock exchange.

In July 2013, Autosport named Bräck one of the top 50 greatest drivers to have never raced in Formula One.

== Other racing ==
Bräck was employed by Lanzante Motorsport to drive one of the most prestigious cars, a 1964 Shelby Daytona Coupé, in the RAC Tourist Trophy race at the Goodwood Revival in September 2011. Only six original cars exist. Sharing the driving duties with nine-time Le Mans winner Tom Kristensen, Bräck qualified the car on pole position. The duo also won the race. In September 2013 Bräck, in partnership with Red Bull F1 Racing's Adrian Newey won the Goodwood revival fifty-year anniversary The Whitsun Trophy, where Bräck performed a rain qualifying that went viral on social media. The duo went on to win the race. Also in September, Bräck co-drove Christian Glaesel's Ford GT40 in the Spa 6-Hours race, together with the owner and Olivier Ellerbrock. Bräck qualified the car on pole. Eventually the car finished in fifth place.

=== X Games ===
In 2009, four years after retiring from IndyCar racing, Bräck made a surprise return to the wheel after receiving a special invitation to compete in the annual ESPN X Games 15 in Los Angeles. Bräck drove a Ford Fiesta prepared by Swedish team Olsbergs MSE. Bräck was the fastest qualifier and went on to win the competition outright in a head-to-head final against previous Rally Gold Medal winner and nine time overall X-Games Gold Medal winner Travis Pastrana. Bräck became the first specially invited driver to win the Rally Gold Medal. The late WRC star Colin McRae previously held the top spot with a second-place finish.

=== Rally ===
In 2011, Bräck won his second stage rally in his career, Dukerie's Rally outside Nottingham, England, in a Ford Escort Mk II BDG with Swedish co-driver Emil Axelsson. In July 2011, the duo won the Swedish classic The Midnight Sun Rally in the same car, in front of the previous year's winner Kenneth Bäcklund and rally world champion Björn Waldegård.

== Racing record ==
=== Complete International Formula 3000 results ===
(key) (Races in bold indicate pole position) (Races in italics indicate fastest lap)

Year	Entrant	1	2	3	4	5	6	7	8	9	10	DC	Points
1994	Madgwick International	SIL; 12	PAU; DNS	CAT; 11	PER; 11	HOC; 9	SPA; 3	EST; 6	MAG; 10			11th	5
1995	Madgwick International	SIL; 5	CAT; 13†	PAU; 4	**PER**; Ret	HOC; 2	SPA; Ret	EST; 3	**MAG**; 1			4th	24
1996	Super Nova Racing	**NÜR**; 1	PAU; 2	PER; Ret	**HOC**; 1	**SIL**; 1	SPA; 5	MAG; 2	EST; 3	MUG; 3	HOC; DSQ	**2nd**	**49**

=== American open–wheel results ===
(key)

==== IndyCar Series ====
Year	Team	No.	Chassis	Engine	1	2	3	4	5	6	7	8	9	10	11	12	13	14	15	16	17	Rank	Points	Ref
1996–97	Galles Racing	4	G-Force GF01	Oldsmobile Aurora V8	NHM	LVS	WDW	PHX; 11	INDY; 33	TXS; 18	PPIR; 14	CLT; 5	NH2; 5	LV2; 20								19th	139	
1998	A. J. Foyt Enterprises	14	Dallara IR8	Oldsmobile Aurora V8	WDW; 13	PHX; 14	INDY; 6	TXS; 3	NHM; 18	DOV; 10	CLT; 1	PPIR; 1	ATL; 1	TX2; 5	LVS; 10							**1st**	**332**	
1999	A. J. Foyt Enterprises	14	Dallara IR9	Oldsmobile Aurora V8	WDW; 22	PHX; 24	CLT; C	INDY; 1	TXS; 13	PPIR; 7	ATL; 3	DOV; 3	PPI2; 10	LVS; 2	TX2; 16							2nd	256	
2002	Chip Ganassi Racing	22	G-Force GF05C	Chevrolet Indy V8	HMS	PHX	FON	NZR	INDY; 11	TXS	PPIR	RIR	KAN	NSH	MIS	KTY	STL	CHI	TX2			42nd	19	
2003	Team Rahal	15	Dallara IR-03	Honda HI3R V8	HMS; 11	PHX; 5	MOT; 2	INDY; 16	TXS; 4	PPIR; 7	RIR; 7	KAN; 5	NSH; 6	MIS; 18	STL; 19	KTY; 19	NZR; 5	CHI; 21	FON; 20	TX2; 16		9th	342	
2005	Rahal Letterman Racing	15	Panoz GF09C	Honda HI5R V8	HMS	PHX	STP	MOT	INDY; 26	TXS	RIR	KAN	NSH	MIL	MIS	KTY	PPIR	SNM	CHI	WGL	FON	34th	10	

==== CART ====
Year	Team	No.	Chassis	Engine	1	2	3	4	5	6	7	8	9	10	11	12	13	14	15	16	17	18	19	20	21	Rank	Points	Ref
2000	Team Rahal	8	Reynard 2Ki	Ford XF V8 t	MIA; 18	LBH; 17	RIO; 10	MOT; 5	NZR; 3	MIL; 4	DET; 24	POR; 6	CLE; 2	TOR; 10	MIS; 22	CHI; 4	MDO; 5	ROA; 3	VAN; 9	LS; 5	STL; 11	HOU; 15	SRF; 2	FON; 13		**4th**	**135**	
2001	Team Rahal	8	Lola B01/00	Ford XF V8 t	**MTY**; 5	LBH; 25	**TXS**; NH	NZR; 2	MOT; 1	**MIL**; 1	DET; 9	POR; 11	CLE; 6	TOR; 20	**MIS**; 17	CHI; 1	MDO; 20	**ROA**; 14	VAN; 8	LAU; 1	**ROC**; 2	HOU; 7	LS; 25	SRF; 5	FON; 26	**2nd**	**163**	
2002	Chip Ganassi Racing	12	Lola B02/00	Toyota RV8F V8 t	MTY; 18	LBH; 5	MOT; 17	MIL; 8	LS; 3	POR; 15	CHI; 18	TOR; 2	CLE; 4	VAN; 18	MDO; 6	ROA; 14	MTL; 18	DEN; 7	**ROC**; 8	MIA; 13	SRF; 4	FON; 12	MEX; 1			**6th**	**114**	

==== Indianapolis 500 ====
Year	Chassis	Engine	Start	Finish	Team
1997	G-Force GF01	Oldsmobile Aurora V8	15	33	Galles Racing
1998	Dallara IR8	Oldsmobile Aurora V8	3	6	A. J. Foyt Enterprises
1999	Dallara IR9	Oldsmobile Aurora V8	8	**1**	A. J. Foyt Enterprises
2002	G-Force GF05C	Chevrolet Indy V8	21	11	Chip Ganassi Racing
2003	Dallara IR-03	Honda HI3R V8	6	16	Team Rahal
2005	Panoz GF09C	Honda HI5R V8	23	26	Rahal Letterman Racing

=== Complete FIA European Rallycross Championship results ===
==== Division 1 ====
Year	Entrant	Car	1	2	3	4	5	6	7	8	9	10	ERX	Points
2009	Kenny Bräck	Citroën C4 T16	GBR	POR	FRA	HUN	AUT	SWE; 10	BEL	GER	POL	CZE	27th	7

=== International Race of Champions ===
(key) (Bold – Pole position. * – Most laps led.)

International Race of Champions results
Year	Make	1	2	3	4	Pos.	Points	Ref
1999	Pontiac	DAY; 4	TAL; 5	MCH; 8	IND; 10	6th	34	
2001	Pontiac	DAY; 4	TAL; 2	MCH; 3	IND; 3	3rd	57	

Sporting positions
Preceded by Robert Amren	Barber Saab Pro Series Champion; 1993	Succeeded by Diego Guzmán
Preceded by Tony Stewart	Pep Boys Indy Racing League Champion; 1998	Succeeded by Greg Ray
Preceded by Eddie Cheever	Indianapolis 500 Winner; 1999	Succeeded by Juan Pablo Montoya
Preceded by Juan Pablo Montoya	CART Rookie of the Year; 2000	Succeeded by Scott Dixon
Awards
Preceded by Hélio Castroneves	Scott Brayton Award; 2005	Succeeded by Sam Hornish Jr.
