= 2000 Michigan 500 =

(United States) 2000 Michigan 500
Race details
- Race 11 of 20 in the 2000 CART season
- Date: July 23, 2000
- Official name: 2000 Michigan 500
- Location: Michigan International Speedway, Brooklyn, Michigan, United States
- Course: Permanent racing facility 2.000 mi / 3.219 km
- Distance: 250 laps 500.000 mi / 804.672 km

Pole position
- Driver: Paul Tracy (Team Green)
- Time: 30.645 (234.94 mph)

Fastest lap
- Driver: Juan Montoya (Chip Ganassi Racing)
- Time: 31.162 (on lap 232 of 250)

Podium
- First: Juan Montoya (Chip Ganassi Racing)
- Second: Michael Andretti (Newman/Haas Racing)
- Third: Dario Franchitti (Team Green)

The 2000 Michigan 500 was the eleventh round of the twenty-round 2000 CART season. It happened at the Michigan International Speedway.

== Qualifying ==
The Canadian driver Paul Tracy, from Team Green, set the pole, followed by Michael Andretti and Christian Fittipaldi.

Qualifying - 22 July 2000
Pos.	No.	Driver	Team	Lap Time	Behind	Speed (mph)
1	26	(Canada) Paul Tracy	Team Green	30,645		234.949
2	6	(United States) Michael Andretti	Newman/Haas Racing	30,687	0,042	234.627
3	11	(Brazil) Christian Fittipaldi	Newman/Haas Racing	30,739	0,094	234.230
4	27	(Scotland) Dario Franchitti	Team Green	30,878	0,233	233.176
5	2	(Brazil) Gil de Ferran	Team Penske	30,904	0,259	232.980
6	12	(United States) Jimmy Vasser	Chip Ganassi Racing	30,933	0,288	232.761
7	1	(Colombia) Juan Pablo Montoya	Chip Ganassi Racing	30,963	0,318	232.536
8	33	(Canada) Alex Tagliani R	Forsythe Racing	30,990	0,345	232.333
9	32	(Canada) Patrick Carpentier	Forsythe Racing	31,036	0,391	231.989
10	8	(Sweden) Kenny Bräck R	Team Rahal	31,065	0,420	231.772
11	7	(Italy) Max Papis	Team Rahal	31,127	0,482	231.310
12	40	(Mexico) Adrián Fernández	Patrick Racing	31,146	0,501	231.169
13	3	(Brazil) Hélio Castroneves	Team Penske	31,201	0,556	230.762
14	97	(Brazil) Cristiano da Matta	PPI Motorsports	31,321	0,676	229.878
15	96	(Spain) Oriol Servià R	PPI Motorsports	31,371	0,726	229.511
16	20	(Brazil) Roberto Moreno	Patrick Racing	31,567	0,922	228.086
17	18	(United Kingdom) Mark Blundell	PacWest Racing	31,780	1,135	226.558
18	55	(Brazil) Tony Kanaan	Forsythe Racing	31,835	1,190	226.166
19	5	(Japan) Shinji Nakano R	Walker Racing	31,885	1,240	225.812
20	17	(Brazil) Mauricio Gugelmin	PacWest Racing	31,909	1,264	225.642
21	10	(United States) Memo Gidley	Della Penna Motorsports	32,053	1,408	224.628
22	16	(Mexico) Michel Jourdain Jr.	Bettenhausen Racing	32,175	1,530	223.776
23	25	(Brazil) Luiz Garcia Jr.	Arciero Racing	32,714	2,069	220.089
24	34	(Brazil) Tarso Marques	Dale Coyne Racing	0,000	30,645	0.000
25	19	(Japan) Takuya Kurosawa R	Dale Coyne Racing	0,000	30,645	0,000

- R Eligible for Rookie of the Year

== Race ==
Eventual winner Juan Pablo Montoya led the race at the end of the first lap through to lap 16, where he was overtaken by eventual runner up Michael Andretti. Across the 250 laps, the race saw nine different leaders, with 52 lead changes. There were five cautions over the course of the race, taking 38 laps in total. Thirteen cars did not finish the race, and only seven cars completed the full 500-mile distance. The race culminated in a battle between Montoya and Andretti, with seven lead changes in the final twenty laps. Montoya set the race's fastest lap on lap 232 of 250. Andretti led lap 249, but was passed by Montoya on the final lap. Montoya's margin of victory was just 0.040s. Montoya's victory was Toyota's second in ChampCar, and he became the first driver since Rick Mears in 1991 to win both the Indianapolis 500 and Michigan 500 in the same year.

Race results
Rank	Driver
1	(Colombia) Juan Pablo Montoya
2	(United States) Michael Andretti
3	(United Kingdom) Dario Franchitti
4	(Canada) Patrick Carpentier
5	(Brazil) Hélio Castroneves

== Championship Battle ==
Michael Andretti became the new leader of the championship with 100 points. The previous leader, Roberto Moreno was in 2nd with 90 points. Race winner Juan Pablo Montoya moved up to 5th in the Championship standings with 74 points.

== Broadcasting ==
The Michigan 500 was broadcast by ABC. Paul Page was the lead announcer and was joined by Parker Johnstone as color commentator.

The race had a lead-in audience from the 2000 Open Championship as Tiger Woods won his first Open Championship. In the United States, the race had a 2.5 overnight rating. The race had a final rating of 2.0 with 2.058 million households watching. It was the most-watched CART race of 2000.

Qualifying for the race was broadcast tape-delayed on ESPN2 on the morning of Sunday, July 23. The qualifying broadcast had a rating of 0.1 and watched by 45,000 households.

== Standings after the race ==
Drivers' Championship standings
Rank	+/–	Driver	Points
1	1	(United States) Michael Andretti	104
2	1	(Brazil) Roberto Moreno	90
3	1	(Canada) Paul Tracy	80
4	1	(Brazil) Gil de Ferran	75
5	4	(Colombia) Juan Pablo Montoya	74

Constructors' standings
Rank	+/–	Constructor	Points
1		(United Kingdom) Reynard	215
2		(United Kingdom) Lola	173
3		(United States) Swift	5

Manufacturers' standings
Rank	+/–	Manufacturer	Points
1		(United Kingdom) Ford-Cosworth	194
2		(Japan) Honda	169
3		(Japan) Toyota	165
4		(Germany) Mercedes	46
Sources:

- Note: Only the top five positions are included for the drivers' standings.

Previous race: 2000 Molson Indy Toronto	CART Indycar World Series; 2000 season	Next race: 2000 TARGET Grand Prix
Previous race: 1999 U.S. 500 Presented by Toyota	Marlboro 500	Next race: 2001 Harrah's 500
