= 2001 Harrah's 500 (CART) =

Coordinates: 42°03′59″N 84°14′29″W

(United States) 2001 Michigan 500
Race details
- Race 11 of 21 in the 2001 CART season
- Date: July 22, 2001
- Official name: 2001 Harrah's 500 Presented by Toyota
- Location: Michigan International Speedway, Brooklyn, Michigan
- Course: Permanent racing facility 2.000 mi / 3.219 km
- Distance: 250 laps 500.000 mi / 804.672 km
- Weather: Partly cloudy

Pole position
- Driver: (Sweden) Kenny Bräck (Team Rahal)
- Time: Field set by practice times; 31.330

Fastest lap
- Driver: (Canada) Patrick Carpentier (Forsythe Racing)
- Time: 32.547 (on lap 130 of 250)

Podium
- First: (Canada) Patrick Carpentier (Forsythe Racing)
- Second: (United Kingdom) Dario Franchitti (Team Green)
- Third: (Mexico) Michel Jourdain Jr. (Bettenhausen Racing)

The 2001 Michigan 500 was a Championship Auto Racing Teams (CART) race held on July 22, 2001, at Michigan International Speedway in Brooklyn, Michigan, before a crowd of 40,000 spectators. Branded as the 2001 Harrah's 500 Presented by Toyota for sponsorship reasons, it was the 11th round of the 2001 CART season, the 32nd running of the event, and the last time the event was held to CART rules as it became an Indy Racing League (IRL) race in 2002. Forsythe Racing's Patrick Carpentier won the 250-lap event by 0.243 seconds over Dario Franchitti of Team Green and Bettenhausen Racing's Michel Jourdain Jr. was third.

The season points leader going into the race, Kenny Bräck, was awarded the pole position when qualifying was cancelled due to rain. The starting grid was determined by the fastest lap times from the third practice session. Bräck led until his teammate Max Papis overtook him on lap six. Papis and Bräck exchanged the lead for six laps, which ended when Bräck strengthened his hold on the position. The lead changed 60 times among ten different drivers, with Papis leading the most laps (83). On lap 248, Carpentier moved to the lead, and held it until Franchitti and Jourdain overtook him on the final lap. Carpentier's lapped teammate Alex Tagliani passed Franchitti and Jourdain to provide Carpentier with drafting assistance at the exit of turn four, allowing Carpentier to achieve his first CART victory.

Bräck still led the Drivers' Championship with 83 points, but he failed to finish after a collision with his teammate Papis on the 233rd lap. Franchitti moved from fourth to second and lowered Bräck's lead to three points. Hélio Castroneves kept third, while Michael Andretti fell to fourth after his engine failed. His teammate Cristiano da Matta overtook Gil de Ferran for fifth. Honda increased its Manufacturers' Championship lead over Toyota to 20 points, while Ford Cosworth kept third with ten races left in the season.

== Background ==
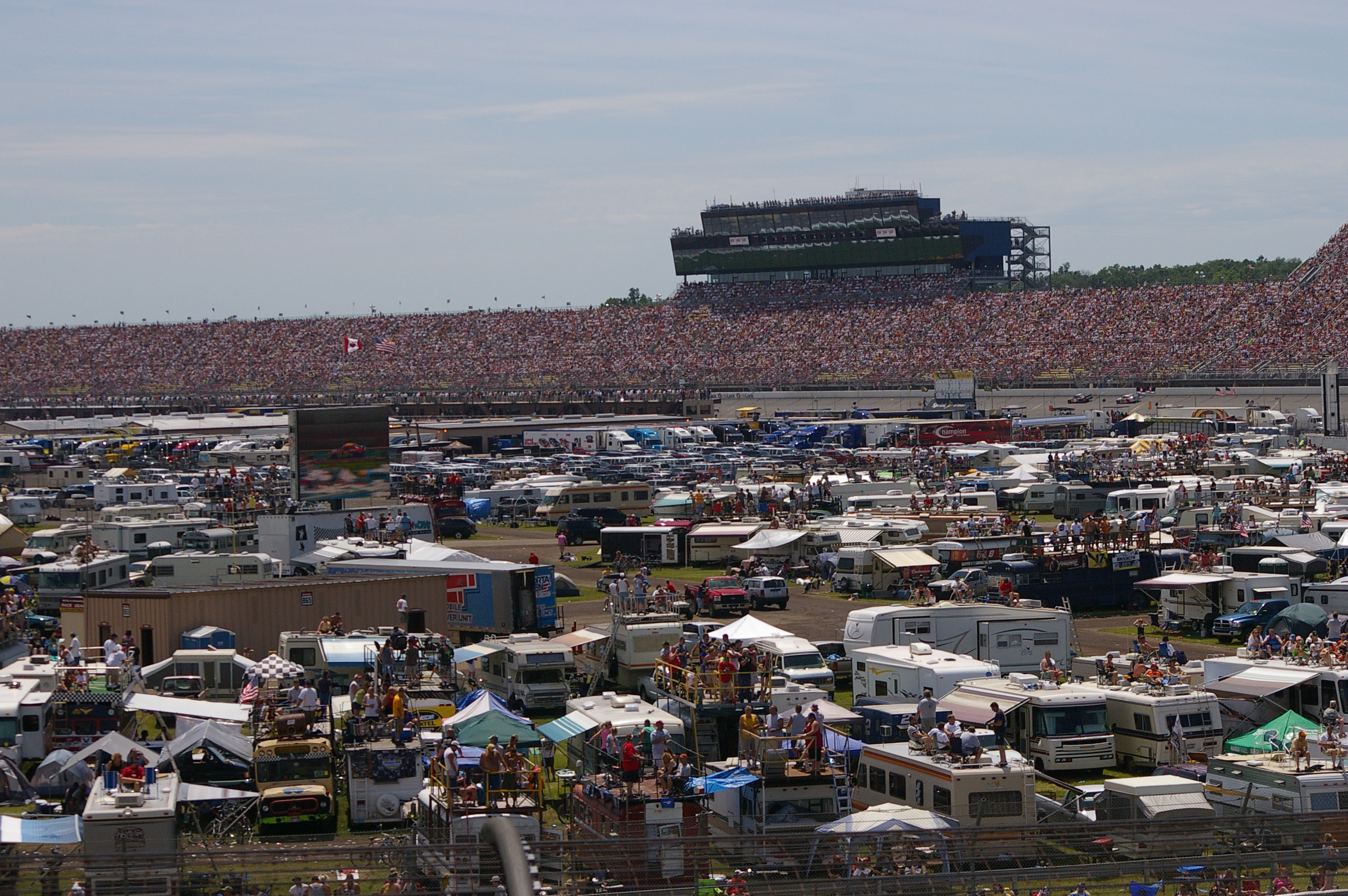
Michigan International Speedway, where the race was held.

The Michigan 500 was confirmed as part of CART's 2001 schedule in August 2000. It was the 32nd consecutive year that the 2 mi (3.2 km) Michigan International Speedway had held a race in the series and the eighth round to occur in the United States that year. The event was the 11th of 21 scheduled races for the 2001 season, and was to be held over a distance of 250 laps on July 22 of that year. On July 19, 2001, three days before the race, gaming corporation Harrah's Entertainment signed on as the race's title sponsor. The event would henceforth be known as the Harrah's 500 Presented by Toyota.

Before the race, Team Rahal driver Kenny Bräck led the Drivers' Championship with 83 points, 10 ahead of Michael Andretti in second and a further three in front of Hélio Castroneves in third. Dario Franchitti was fourth on 65 points, ahead of fifth-placed Gil de Ferran with 58 points. Honda led the Manufacturers' Championship with 158 points; Toyota was second on 142 points, 12 ahead of Ford Cosworth in third. Juan Pablo Montoya was the race's defending winner from the 2000 edition; he did not enter the event because he had left CART after the 2000 season and moved to Formula One. There were nine Brazilian drivers. four Americans, three Canadians, two each from Italy, Japan and Mexico and one each from New Zealand, Scotland, Spain and Sweden.

In June 2001, it was announced that Michigan International Speedway would not hold a CART race for the 2002 season. Track president Brett Shelton said the circuit and its parent company International Speedway Corporation (ISC) sought to pursue other alternatives. It was later reported that Michigan International Speedway requiested from paying sanctioning fees for the event, estimated to be around $2 to $2.5 million, to alleviate the financial losses from decreasing track attendance. Other reasons included the lack of promotion of the event by the ISC and CART compared to the promotion of an ARCA stock car race held at the same track. Andretti had mixed feelings on not returning to the track, saying from a spectator viewpoint, it would be a loss for television. However, he spoke of his relief at CART not returning to Michigan International Speedway, citing series regulations on top speeds. Michigan International Speedway went on to hold a race in the Indy Racing League (IRL) (later IndyCar Series) from 2002 to 2007.

For the Harrah's 500 and the season-ending Marlboro 500 in November, a reduction of permissible manifold value pressure from 37 in (940 mm) to 36 in (910 mm) was mandated by CART after the series and its engine manufacturers reached an agreement over how the problem should be dealt with when Toyota complained that Ford Cosworth and Honda developed a turbocharger pop-off valve technology improvement at the Tenneco Automotive Grand Prix of Detroit in June. CART also instructed all teams to run a new version of the Handford device, which had a 3 in (76 mm) extension to the backboard below the rear wing. It lowered the overall top speed of all cars by adding drag. Another alteration to the cars was the introduction of an extended "pop-off" value case extension of 3/4 in (19 mm) to the base of the manifold pressure relief valve. CART chairman and CEO Joseph Heitzler said he was pleased the issue had been resolved but regretted the position it presented to its partners. "CART's position that it is our duty as a sanctioning body to provide strong leadership to our members, under the rule book, while maintaining a process enabling them to make informed decisions. Our conversations over the past three weeks have strengthened our determination in both these regards."

== Practice and qualifying ==
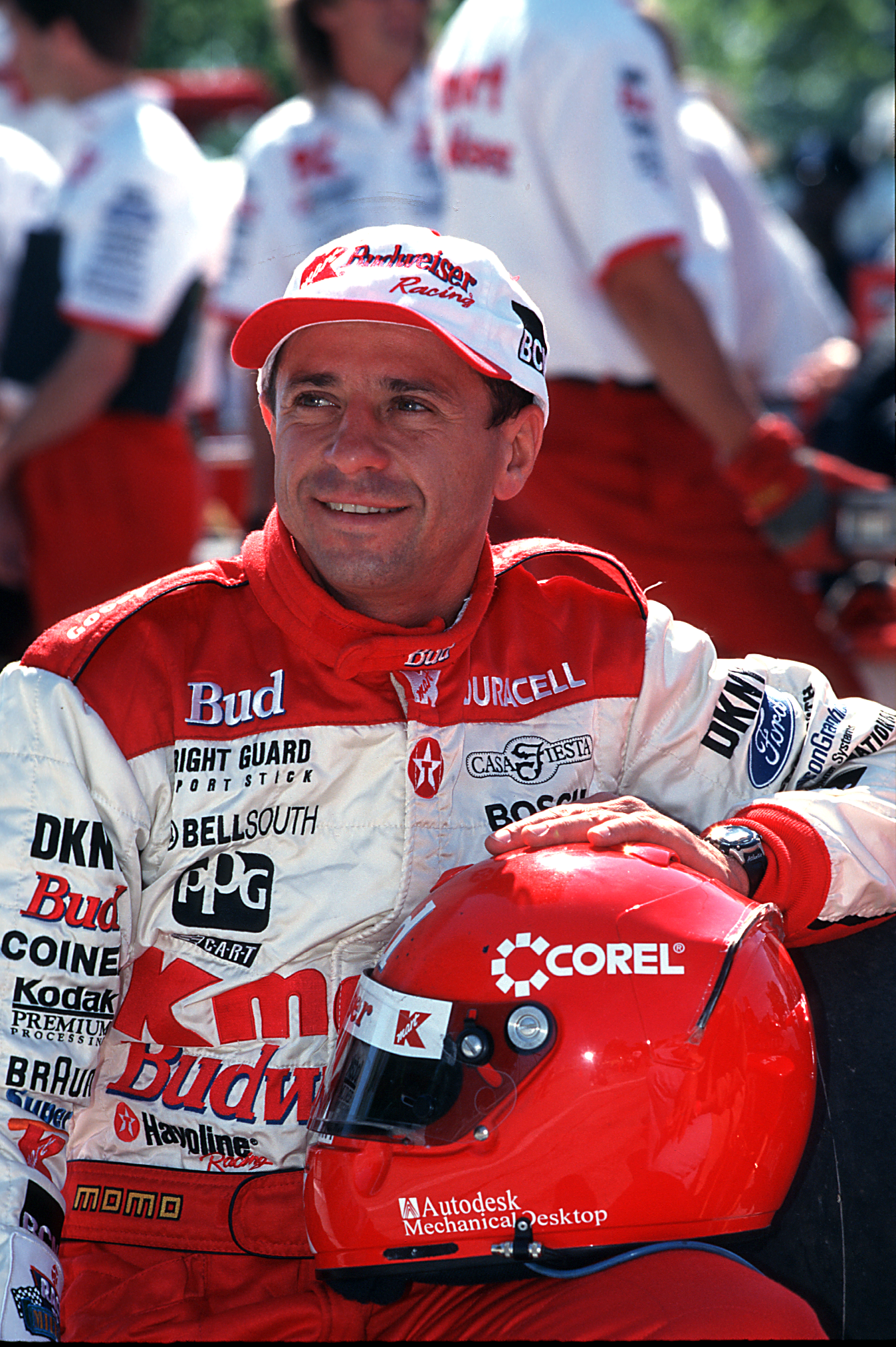
Roberto Moreno (pictured in 1997) emerged uninjured after a heavy accident in the first practice session.

There were three practice sessions preceding Sunday's race: two on Friday and one on Saturday. The first session ran for 105 minutes, the second 75 minutes, and the third 60 minutes. A half hour test for rookie drivers scheduled for mid-morning on Friday was delayed twice due to a thick fog that later lifted, and a major technical problem with the communication loop in race control preventing direct contact with teams and shortening the session to ten minutes. Alex Zanardi lapped fastest at 34.563 seconds, followed by Bruno Junqueira and Scott Dixon. In the first practice session, Bräck was fastest with a 31.809 seconds lap, with Canadians Patrick Carpentier and Alex Tagliani second and third. Roberto Moreno, Cristiano da Matta, Castroneves, Oriol Servià, Junqueira, Maurício Gugelmin, and Max Papis were in fourth to tenth. After 45 minutes, the first caution was waved for officials to inspect the track because several teams reported cut tires after examining them on pit road.

As Carpentier overtook him on the outside, Moreno lost control of his car on the exit of turn two due to turbulence removing downforce from his car. His front-left tire and Franchitti's rear-right wheel collided, sending Moreno broadside into the inside tire barrier with his car's left-front corner at approximately 175 mph (282 km/h). The impact cracked the interior of Moreno's helmet, but a HANS device prevented him from sustaining more serious injuries and from being rendered unconscious. Moreno's car ricocheted off the wall and stopped around halfway down the back stretch. The session ended early with 17 minutes to go because of the damage to the tire barrier, which course officials repaired. Moreno was transported to the infield care center by stretcher, and was declared fit to partake in the second practice session.

Papis led the second practice session with a 31.853 seconds lap, followed by Tagliani, Bräck, Paul Tracy, Bryan Herta, Tora Takagi, Tony Kanaan, Christian Fittipaldi, Memo Gidley, and Andretti. The first caution came after seven minutes when course observers located a loose bolt in turn one's groove, since the track had been inspected and cleaned. Gugelmin's right-front tire was cut by debris on the track, prompting a second caution for a track inspection and clean-up. With a time of 31.330 seconds, Bräck led the final practice session. Second to tenth were Papis, Takagi, Tracy, and Kanaan, Michel Jourdain Jr., Herta, Shinji Nakano, Fittipaldi, and Gugelmin.

During the session, Max Wilson spun leaving turn one below the white line denoting the boundaries of the trackat approximately 219 mph (352 km/h). The transition from a banked turn to a flat surface removed his front wing, and he struck the outside concrete barrier before stopping in the centre of turn two. Wilson was transported by helicopter to Foote Memorial Hospital, Jackson, complaining of left rib pain. Although X-ray examinations found no injuries to Wilson, his team Arciero-Blair Racing withdrew from the race because his car could not be repaired, and had no spare vehicle following a crash at the preceding week's Molson Indy Toronto. Franchitti caused the second caution after the plenum flew off his car's top, and lodged in his rear wing in turn two. He stopped at the bottom of the next corner with smoke billowing from his car. It was removed from the track by the trackside safety crew who subsequently cleaned the circuit.

== Qualifying ==
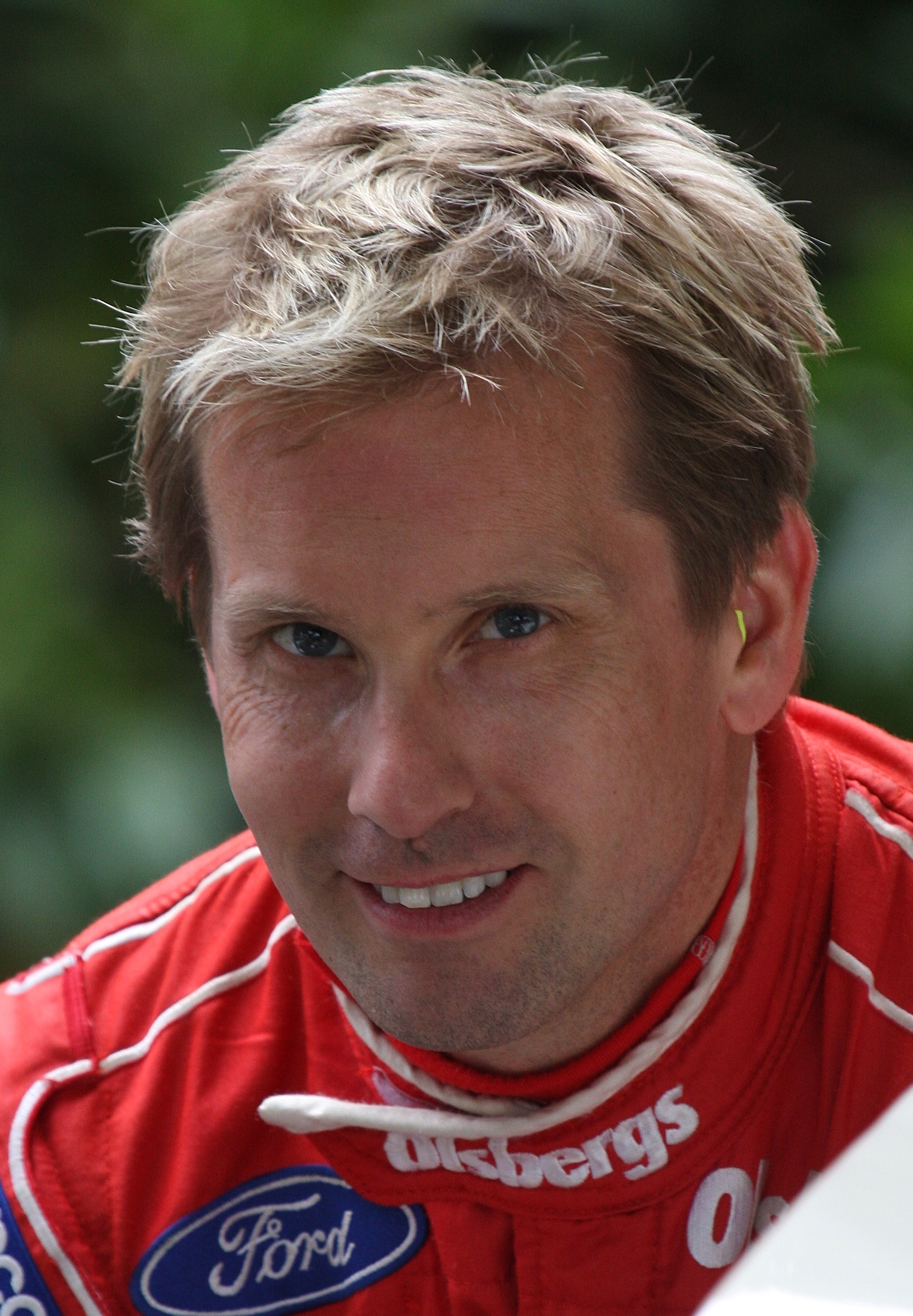
Kenny Bräck (pictured in 2011) was awarded his fourth pole position of the season as the fastest driver in the third practice session.

Saturday afternoon's qualifying session was due to last two hours starting from 12:00 EDT (UTC+04:00). Plans were made to begin qualifying with the slowest driver in the weekend's combined practice sessions going out first and the quickest competitor heading out last. Rules restricted each driver to two timed laps, and the pole position winner earned one point towards the Drivers' Championship. Seven drivers ventured onto the track to set a lap time that were much slower than in practice since they were not running in the draft and the cars were carrying more craft due to the rear wing extension. This was before rain stopped all on-track activity after 28 minutes. Rain stopped for about half an hour before returning to the area. The session was officially cancelled by CART chief steward Chris Kneifel at 3:00 p.m. local time after attempts to make the track driveable again were unsuccessful. Kneifel elected to use the third practice session's lap times and not the drivers' order in the seasons' points standings to set the race's starting order. This was the second time in the 2001 season that qualifying was cancelled due to inclement weather. The decision gave Bräck his fourth pole position of the season. Due to no qualifying, he did not earn the one point for pole position. He was joined on the grid's front row by his teammate Papis. Takagi, Tracy, Kanaan, Jourdain, Herta, Nakano, Fittipaldi, and Gugelmin completed the top ten.

=== Qualifying classification ===
Qualifying results
Pos	No.	Driver	Team	Time	Speed	Gap
1	8	Kenny Bräck (SWE)	Team Rahal	31.330	229.812	—
2	7	Max Papis (ITA)	Team Rahal	31.483	228.695	+0.153
3	5	Toranosuke Takagi (JPN)	Walker Racing	31.591	227.913	+0.261
4	26	Paul Tracy (CAN)	Team Green	31.609	227.783	+0.279
5	55	Tony Kanaan (BRA)	Mo Nunn Racing	31.626	227.661	+0.296
6	16	Michel Jourdain Jr. (MEX)	Bettenhausen Racing	31.676	227.301	+0.346
7	77	Bryan Herta (USA)	Forsythe Racing	31.726	226.943	+0.396
8	52	Shinji Nakano (JPN)	Fernández Racing	31.752	226.757	+0.422
9	11	Christian Fittipaldi (BRA)	Newman/Haas Racing	31.766	226.657	+0.436
10	17	Maurício Gugelmin (BRA)	PacWest Racing	31.784	226.529	+0.454
11	1	Gil de Ferran (BRA)	Team Penske	31.789	226.493	+0.459
12	18	Scott Dixon (NZL)	PacWest Racing	31.877	225.868	+0.547
13	6	Cristiano da Matta (BRA)	Newman/Haas Racing	31.890	225.776	+0.560
14	66	Alex Zanardi (ITA)	Mo Nunn Racing	31.893	225.755	+0.563
15	40	Jimmy Vasser (USA)	Patrick Racing	31.896	225.734	+0.566
16	12	Memo Gidley (USA)	Chip Ganassi Racing	31.949	225.359	+0.619
17	20	Roberto Moreno (BRA)	Patrick Racing	31.950	225.352	+0.620
18	39	Michael Andretti (USA)	Team Motorola	31.976	225.169	+0.646
19	3	Hélio Castroneves (BRA)	Team Penske	32.041	224.712	+0.711
20	51	Adrián Fernández (MEX)	Fernández Racing	32.170	223.811	+0.840
21	32	Patrick Carpentier (CAN)	Forsythe Racing	32.218	223.478	+0.888
22	4	Bruno Junqueira (BRA)	Chip Ganassi Racing	32.244	223.297	+0.914
23	22	Oriol Servià (ESP)	Sigma Autosport	32.260	223.187	+0.930
24	33	Alex Tagliani (CAN)	Forsythe Racing	32.261	223.180	+0.931
25	27	Dario Franchitti (GBR)	Team Green	32.660	220.453	+1.330
WD	25	Max Wilson (BRA)	Arciero-Blair Racing	No time	No Speed	—^{1}
The starting order was determined the fastest laps in the third practice session after rain cancelled qualifying.

Notes

- ^1— Max Wilson was withdrawn as a result of a heavy accident during the third practice session.

== Warm-up ==
The drivers took to the track at 09:30 a.m. local time for a half hour warm-up session that went incident-free in warm, dry and sunny weather. Vasser was faster than he had been over the weekend and lapped quickest at 32.404 seconds, 0.029 seconds faster than Papis in second place. Tracy, Takagi, Kanaan, Bräck, Herta, Andretti, Fittipaldi, and Castroneves followed in positions three to ten.

== Race ==
The weather at the start of the race were partly cloudy, with the air temperature between 92 and 93 °F (33 and 34 °C) and the track temperature between 120 and 129 °F (49 and 54 °C). An estimated 40,000 spectators visited the track to observe the action. The race began with the waving of the green flag at 1:46 p.m. Bräck steered left to the bottom grove with his teammate Papis behind him. Papis overtook Bräck for the lead on the back stretch on the first lap. On lap three, Takagi lost third to Kanaan. Bräck retook the first position from his teammate Papis three laps later. The two exchanged the lead for the next seven laps until Bräck assumed his hold on the position. On the 15th lap, Adrián Fernández's engine suddenly lost power, and he went to pit road. Changes to some car components failed to rectify the problem, making him the race's first retirement. Papis returned to first place after passing his teammate Bräck on the following lap. He enlarged his small lead to 0.533 seconds by lap 20. Herta overtook Bräck for second place two laps later and kept the position until Kanaan took it on the 26th lap. At this point Bräck was running in sixth place, while Andretti moved to third place by lap 28.

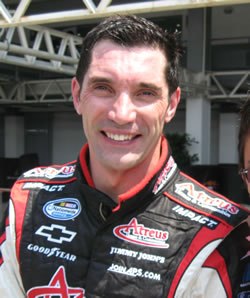
Max Papis (pictured in 2008) led more laps than any other driver (83) but was eliminated from contention after a crash with his teammate Bräck.

Through laps 31 to 34, Kanaan tried to get past Papis to become the new leader, but he could not do so. Green flag pit stops began on the 35th lap when Papis went to pit road. Kanaan took over the lead, but he lost it to Gidley on lap 36. A malfunctioning fuel nozzle on lap 38 dropped Tracy three laps behind Gidley Herta took the lead on lap 39, only to lose it to Fittipaldi on the next lap. As Fittipaldi was about to make his first pit stop on the 41st lap, he spun and stalled his car on the entry to pit road. Trackside workers could not restart it and he was pushed to his pit stall. Gidley regained the first position when Herta entered pit road on the next lap. Gidley extended the lead over Papis to 1.047 seconds by the start of lap 50. Six laps later, Papis overtook Gidley to reclaim the lead. On lap 60, Gidley returned to the lead. Papis retook the lead on the 63rd lap but lost it to Gidley two laps later. The leaders began the second round of pit stops on lap 75 when Papis and Andretti made their stops. Gidley made his stop on the next lap, giving the first position to Bräck who held it until the 81st lap, when Herta got three laps more fuel mileage to get back to first.

After the pit stops, Bräck returned to the first position. Carpentier had fluctuating turbocharger boost pressure in the opening laps of the race, losing him as much as 1.5 in (38 mm) of turbocharger boost and top speed down the circuit's two straights. He later fell two laps adrift of the leaders because of this mechanical problem. On lap 97, de Ferran pulled off the track at turn one and became the second retiree with a loss of power in his vehicle's engine, caused by an electrical fault. Bräck's lead of 0.172 seconds was reduced to nothing when the first caution was prompted on the 100th lap for debris on the back stretch. On the following lap, CART race control determined that Gidley had passed Bräck before the caution came out. All drivers elected to make pit stops during the caution. Racing resumed on lap 112 with Gidley leading. Kanaan turned to the inside line on the front stretch to move from fourth to first on the run to the first corner. However, Gidley overtook Kannan to retake the lead on the back stretch. Kanaan subsequently fell to fifth by the 121st lap as Papis got by Bräck for second on the lap. Six laps later, Papis returned to the first position. He led for one lap as Gidley regained the position. Papis did overtake Gidley to lead lap 129, and Gidley did the same to Papis on the following lap.

On lap 130, the lapped Vasser drove to the side of the track on the back stretch to retire with an unspecified mechanical problem. Bräck got back to the front of the field on lap 139 but was passed by Gidley who led the next lap with a gap of 0.038 seconds over Papis. On lap 142, Franchitti passed Gidley to take over the lead. Gidley moved back past Franchitti to retake the first position on the next lap. On lap 147, Gidley made a pit stop, promoting Franchitti back to the lead. Gidley emerged in sixth place. However, he was shown a black flag on the 148th lap, incurring a drive-through penalty because he was observed speeding on pit road. Gidley took the penalty immediately. On lap 150, Papis lost the lead to his teammate Bräck. The second caution was prompted when debris was located on the track two laps later. Papis had just passed his teammate Bräck again for the first position. Nakano became the fourth retirement when his engine failed on that lap. Papis led the field at the restart on lap 160. Jourdain moved into second as Bräck fell to fourth by the 171st lap. However, Bräck moved back into second five laps later. In the meantime, Kanaan retired with an alternator failure after three pit stops did not result in a successful repair.

His teammate Zanardi lost engine power because of a voltage issue. He slowed before retiring on lap 180. Papis drove back to first on the lap. On lap 181, Andretti passed Jourdain to move into the third position. Four laps later, Andretti went to pit road to retire with an engine problem. Franchitti took over third place because of Andretti's retirement. He moved to second on lap 189. On the next lap, Franchitti overtook Papis to reclaim first place. Bräck returned to the lead on the 196th lap. He held it for the next six laps until Papis passed him when he made a pit stop on lap 202. On the following lap, Franchitti took back the lead when Papis made his pit stop. Jourdain took the lead on the 205th lap holding it until Franchitti overtook him. Two laps later, the lead went to Bräck. He maintained it for four laps until Franchitti passed him. Carpentier got back onto the same lap as Franchitti by overtaking him on lap 213. On lap 215, the fourth caution was given; a mechanical failure at the rear of Fittipaldi's car sent him up the turn four banking, and into a concrete wall heavily. He slid down the banking and into the infield grass as a plume of flames erupted from his car. Fittipaldi was uninjured. During the caution, all cars on the same lap as the leader, including Franchitti, chose to make pit stops on lap 219.

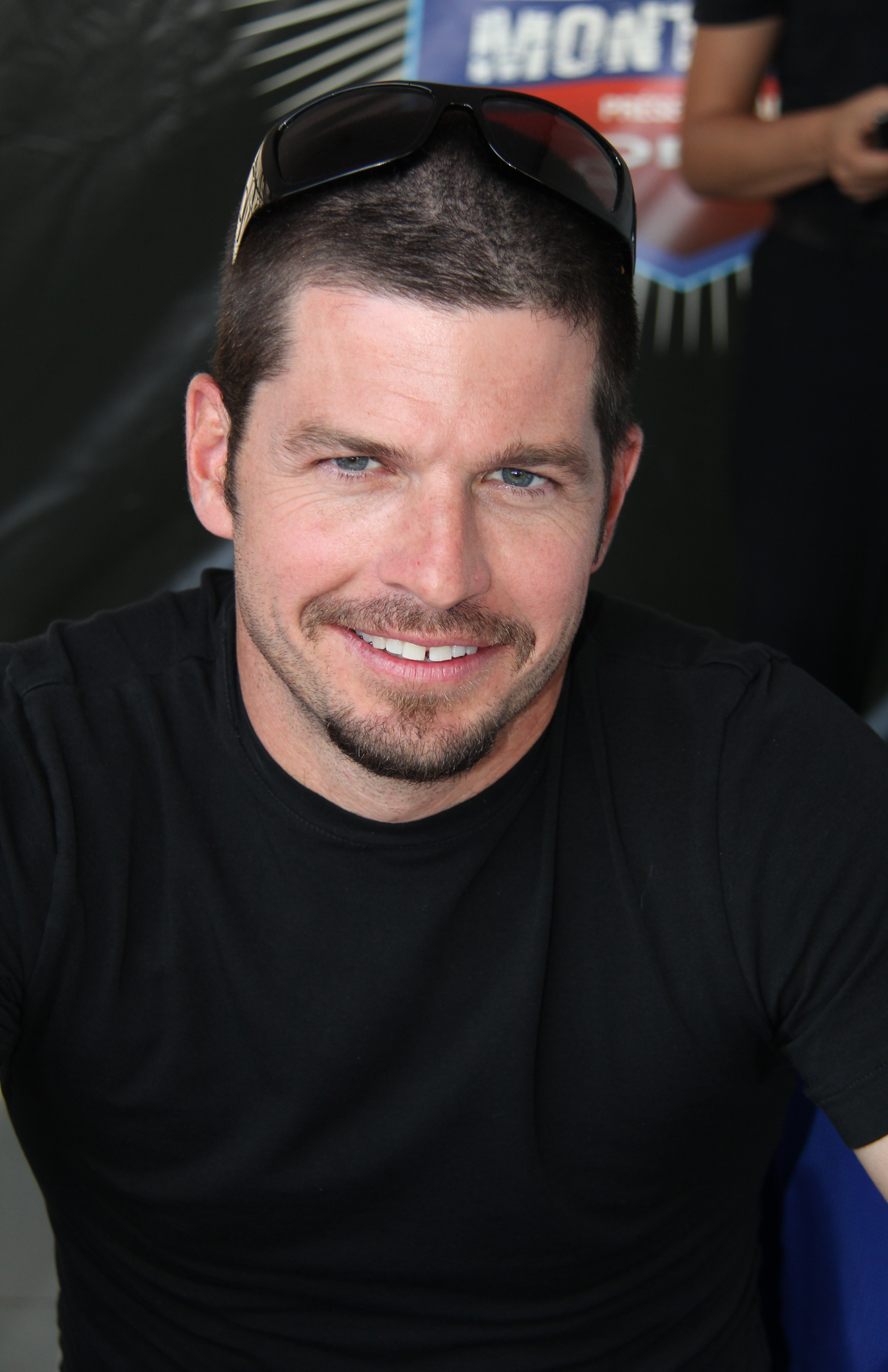
Patrick Carpentier (pictured in 2011) received drafting assistance from his teammate Alex Tagliani to win his maiden CART race.

Bräck won the race off pit road to lead at the lap 225 restart. Jourdain passed Bräck at the bottom of turn one to assume the lead, but Papis overtook him on the back stretch. On the 231st lap, Herta steered right to get by Papis for first with Bräck gaining positions on the middle lane. A two-car crash on lap 233 triggered the fifth (and final) caution. Bräck passed his teammate Papis on his right leaving turn four. As Bräck was about to complete the pass, he appeared to slide in the wake of the turbulent air being created, and his left-hand wheels came into contact with the right-hand wheels of Papis' car. Bräck careened into an outside concrete barrier, and Papis spun sideways at about 220 mph (350 km/h) through turn four after he could not correct the slide. Papis crashed heavily into a wall at the entry to pit road. Both cars rested beside each other at the pit lane entry. Both Bräck and Papis clambered out of their cars uninjured. Seven laps later, racing resumed with Herta leading Carpentier. Herta drew clear to lead by two-tenths of a second but risked being drafted by other drivers with more momentum.

Two laps later, Franchitti turned right to retake the lead as Herta slowed and fell to fourth. Until the 248th lap, Franchitti and Jourdain exchanged the first position twice every lap; Franchitti drew clear in turns one and two, while Jourdain led in turn three. But it was Franchitti who held the advantage by the time the duo crossed the start/finish line. Carpentier passed Franchitti and Jourdain at the first turn to become the new leader on lap 248. He only held the position for a short time as Franchitii and Jourdain moved back into first and second, but Carpentier took the lead each time at the start/finish line. On the final lap, Carpentier led Franchitti and Jourdain on the exit of turn one and onto the back stretch. Franchtti drafted Carpentier and overtook him entering turn three. The lapped Tagliani drafted all three cars to move ahead on the inside line before going up the track. That meant Jourdain went up the banking, and Franchitti slowed in the turbulent air to avoid hitting him. Carpentier glimpsed space to drive through and steered right in turns three and four.

Leaving the final corner, his teammate Tagliani provided Carpentier with drafting help, allowing him to pull away and claim the first win of his career in his 79th CART race by 0.243 seconds. It was Carpentier's first racing victory since the 1996 Atlantic Championship race at Laguna Seca. Both Franchitti and Jourdain were separated by a photo finish in the duel for second. Since the official scoring system which rounded out to three decimal places proved inconclusive, series officials reviewed photographic evidence to determine the finishing order. Franchitti was found to have beat Jourdain by about 2 in (51 mm). A malfunctioning air jack system dropped Da Matta off the lead lap but good fuel mileage allowed him to finish fourth. Fifth-placed Herta got back into the draft but he could not use it to move up the field. Tagliani, Tracy, Castroneves, Junqueira, Dixon, Servià, Moreno, Takagi, Gidley, and Gugelmin were the final classified finishers. There were 60 lead changes among 10 drivers during the course of the race. Papis' total of 83 laps led was the most of any competitor. Carpentier led once for a total of three laps.

=== Post-race ===
Carpentier appeared in victory lane to celebrate the first win of his career in front of the crowd; the win earned him $100,000. He spoke of his delight with the win and was crying on his way to pit road:

"It's been a long time coming and today we were a lap down, were struggling at the beginning of the race and I never thought I would win this one. There were some races (in the past) that we thought we had a serious chance of winning and today for awhile we didn't think so. You need everything to win a race. You need yellow flags to work for you and you need to have a good car, a car that lasts and good pit stops with the team. Then with good luck and good timing, everything worked out for us today."

Franchitti congratulated Carpentier on his win and was generous over coming second, "It was an eventful day. For the first time in my career I started last because of the way they decided qualifying. I was really lucky to not go a lap down. It's not last to first, but last to second isn't too bad, and we picked up some good points." Jourdain said of his third-place finish, "What an unbelievable race. My team did a great job, and we gained positions in the pits. On the last lap, I was sure it was going to be Dario and I. Pat was there the whole time, but then Alex appeared from nowhere. I think Dario and I should both get points for second."

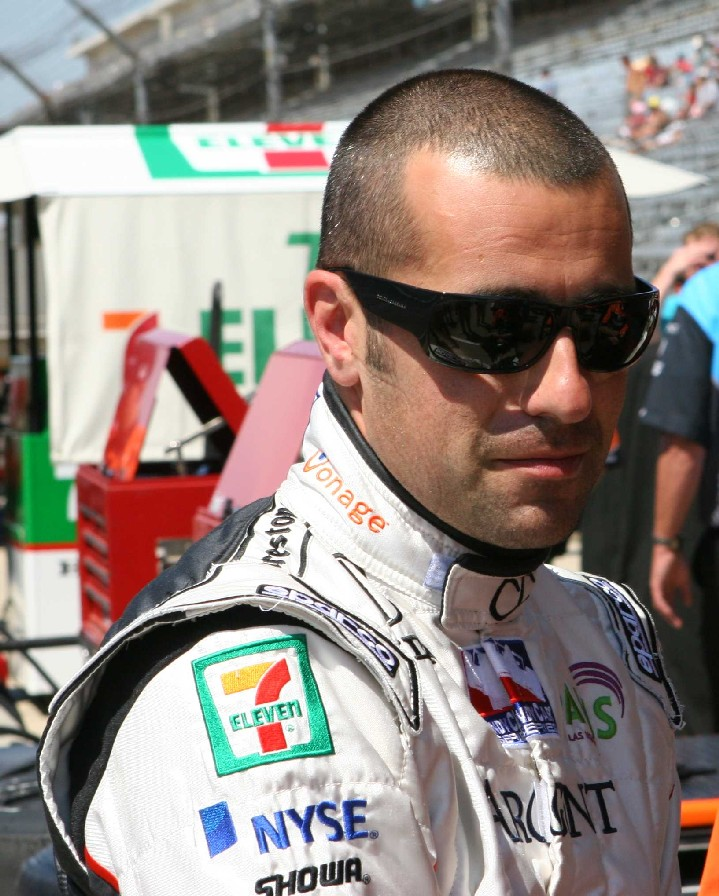
Dario Franchitti (pictured in 2007) was awarded second place by CART after a photo finish with Michel Jourdain Jr.

Tagliani's manoeuvre on the last lap that led to him providing Carpentier with drafting assistance attracted criticism from Franchitti and Jourdain, but both refused to voice their anger towards him. Franchitti stated his belief that in the event any driver went a lap down, it was up to that person to attempt to remain in front of the competitor by having sufficient driving standards, "It's different at a superspeedway than it is at a smaller oval like Chicago, but at that point, at the end of the race when there are five guys on the lead lap, I think it would be nice to fight it out amongst ourselves. But it's very difficult to police something like that." Jourdain spoke of his feeling that the manoeuvre was "pretty dangerous" because it had the potential to create a multi-car accident, "I was sure we were both gone. I was really scared at that point because I thought the four of us (Tagliani, Jourdain, Franchitti and Carpentier) were going to crash. It was an eight or a nine on a 10 scale – very dangerous." Carpentier noted that while the manoeuvre was dangerous, it helped him win, "I think it was a risky move, but in a series as competitive as we have today, one point or two points can make a huge difference at the end of the year. If he was racing for points with Paul, hey, it's racing."

Media and series reactions to the race were positive. Autoweek's Bill McGuire wrote, "It might have been the last 500 mile CART race at Michigan International Speedway, but it was certainly one of the best." Charles Googe of The Albuquerque Tribune spoke of a "thrilling" race in his first half of the season awards for the newspaper, and the Daily Herald's Mike Spellman opined that the round was a good way of attracting people back to open-wheel racing. Spellman reported Bräck lobbied CART to visit more high-banked circuits because of the excitement it provides for the fans with continuous side-by-side racing, and the driver noted the large amount of passing, something that is not seen in Formula One. The reporter for the Associated Press said that the high level of competition witnessed (167 unofficial lead changes) was atypical of all CART races held at the track since the introduction of the Handford device in 1998. In his report for Knight Ridder/Tribune, Steve Crowe wrote, "More than 100,000 empty seats seemed to scream, "Good riddance." But the 25,000 or so who braved the sweltering Sunday farewell party had reason to rave, "Good show." Former CART chief steward Wally Dallenbach Sr. said of the event, "it was the darnedest race I've ever seen."

The final positions left Bräck still at the top of the Drivers' Championship with 84 points but his gap was lowered to three points due to Franchitti's second-place finish advancing him to second. Castroneves' eighth-place result enabled him to advance to third, while Andretti's engine failure dropped him from second to fourth. Da Matta rounded out the top five in the standings. In the Manufacturers' Championship, Honda (with 174 points) enlarged their lead to 20 points over Toyota. Ford Cosworth continued to maintain third place with 148 points with ten races left in the season.

=== Race classification ===
Drivers who scored championship points are denoted in bold.

Race results
Pos	No	Driver	Team	Laps	Time/retired	Grid	Points
1	**32**	**Patrick Carpentier** (CAN)	**Forsythe Racing**	**250**	**2:54.55.757**	**21**	**20**
2	**27**	**Dario Franchitti** (GBR)	**Team Green**	**250**	**+0.243**	**25**	**16**
3	**16**	**Michel Jourdain Jr.** (MEX)	**Bettenhausen Racing**	**250**	**+0.243**	**6**	**14**
4	**6**	**Cristiano da Matta** (BRA)	**Newman/Haas Racing**	**250**	**+0.445**	**13**	**12**
5	**77**	**Bryan Herta** (USA)	**Forsythe Racing**	**250**	**+0.516**	**7**	**10**
6	**33**	**Alex Tagliani** (CAN)	**Forsythe Racing**	**249**	**+1 Lap**	**24**	**8**
7	**26**	**Paul Tracy** (CAN)	**Team Green**	**249**	**+1 Lap**	**4**	**6**
8	**3**	**Hélio Castroneves** (BRA)	**Team Penske**	**249**	**+1 Lap**	**19**	**5**
9	**4**	**Bruno Junqueira** (BRA)	**Chip Ganassi Racing**	**249**	**+1 Lap**	**22**	**4**
10	**18**	**Scott Dixon** (NZL)	**PacWest Racing**	**248**	**+2 Laps**	**12**	**3**
11	**22**	**Oriol Servià** (ESP)	**Sigma Autosport**	**248**	**+2 Laps**	**23**	**2**
12	**20**	**Roberto Moreno** (BRA)	**Patrick Racing**	**248**	**+2 Laps**	**17**	**1**
13	5	Toranosuke Takagi (JPN)	Walker Racing	248	+2 Laps	3	—
14	12	Memo Gidley (USA)	Chip Ganassi Racing	246	+4 Laps	16	—
15	17	Maurício Gugelmin (BRA)	PacWest Racing	246	+4 Laps	10	—
16	**7**	**Max Papis** (ITA)	**Team Rahal**	**232**	**Crash**	**2**	**1**^{2}
17	8	Kenny Bräck (SWE)	Team Rahal	232	Crash	1	—
18	11	Christian Fittipaldi (BRA)	Newman/Haas Racing	204	Crash	9	—
19	39	Michael Andretti (USA)	Team Motorola	185	Engine	18	—
20	66	Alex Zanardi (ITA)	Mo Nunn Racing	179	Electrical	14	—
21	55	Tony Kanaan (BRA)	Mo Nunn Racing	174	Electrical	5	—
22	52	Shinji Nakano (JPN)	Fernández Racing	151	Engine	8	—
23	40	Jimmy Vasser (USA)	Patrick Racing	129	Engine	15	—
24	1	Gil de Ferran (BRA)	Team Penske	97	Electrical	11	—
25	51	Adrián Fernández (MEX)	Fernández Racing	15	Engine	20	—

Notes

- **^2**—Includes one bonus point for leading the most laps.

== Broadcasting ==
The Michigan 500 was broadcast by ABC. Paul Page was the lead announcer and was joined by Parker Johnstone as color commentator. Jon Beekhuis and Scott Pruett served as pit reporters. In the United States, the race had a 1.9 overnight rating. The final rating for the race was 1.6, watched in 1.598 million households. It was the most-watched CART race of the 2001 season.

== Standings after the race ==
Drivers' Championship standings
Rank	+/–	Driver	Points
1		Kenny Bräck (SWE)	83
2	2	Dario Franchitti (GBR)	80 (−3)
3		Hélio Castroneves (BRA)	75 (−8)
4	1	Michael Andretti (USA)	73 (−10)
5	1	Cristiano da Matta (BRA)	67 (−16)

Constructors' standings
Rank	+/–	Constructor	Points
1		Reynard (GBR)	193
2		Lola (GBR)	167 (−27)

Manufacturers' standings
Rank	+/–	Manufacturer	Points
1		Honda (JPN)	174
2		Toyota (JPN)	154 (−20)
3		Ford Cosworth (GBR)	151 (−23)

- Note: Only the top five positions are included for the drivers' standings.

Previous race: 2001 Molson Indy Toronto	CART FedEx Championship Series; 2001 season	Next race: 2001 Target Grand Prix of Chicago
Previous race: 2000 Michigan 500	Harrah's 500	Next race: N/A
