= 2000 Honda Indy 300 =

Coordinates: 27°59′17.9″S 153°25′42.1″E

(Australia) 2000 Surfers Paradise
Race details
- Race 19 of 20 in the 2000 CART season
- Map of the track
- Date: 15 October, 2000
- Official name: Honda Indy 300
- Location: Surfers Paradise Street Circuit; Queensland, Australia
- Course: Temporary Street Circuit; 2.795 mi / 4.498 km
- Distance: 59 laps 164.905 mi / 265.382 km

Pole position
- Driver: (Colombia) Juan Pablo Montoya (Chip Ganassi Racing)
- Time: 1:31.722

Fastest lap
- Driver: (United States) Jimmy Vasser (Chip Ganassi Racing)
- Time: 1:34.959 (on lap 23 of 59)

Podium
- First: (Mexico) Adrián Fernández (Patrick Racing)
- Second: (Sweden) Kenny Bräck (Team Rahal)
- Third: (United States) Jimmy Vasser (Chip Ganassi Racing)

The Gold Coast Indy 300 was the nineteenth and penultimate round of the 2000 CART World Series Season, held on 15 October 2000 on the Surfers Paradise Street Circuit, Surfers Paradise, Queensland, Australia, and was the 5th and last round to be held outside of the United States. It also marked 1998 Bathurst 1000 winner Jason Bright's first and only appearance in the series, where he finished 18th.

== Qualifying results ==
Pos	Nat	Name	Team	Chassis	Time
1	(Colombia)	Juan Pablo Montoya	Chip Ganassi Racing	Lola 2K/00 Toyota	1:31.722
2	(Brazil)	Gil de Ferran	Team Penske	Reynard 2Ki Honda	1:31.827
3	(United Kingdom)	Dario Franchitti	Team Green	Reynard 2Ki Honda	1:32.059
4	(Canada)	Paul Tracy	Team Green	Reynard 2Ki Honda	1:32.328
5	(United States)	Jimmy Vasser	Chip Ganassi Racing	Lola 2K/00 Toyota	1:33.052
6	(United States)	Michael Andretti	Newman-Haas Racing	Lola 2K/00 Ford-Cosworth	1:33.123
7	(Brazil)	Tony Kanaan	Mo Nunn Racing	Reynard 2Ki Mercedes-Benz	1:33.165
8	(Brazil)	Hélio Castroneves	Team Penske	Reynard 2Ki Honda	1:33.474
9	(Brazil)	Christian Fittipaldi	Newman-Haas Racing	Lola 2K/00 Ford-Cosworth	1:33.490
10	(Brazil)	Cristiano da Matta	PPI Motorsports	Reynard 2Ki Toyota	1:33.761
11	(Canada)	Patrick Carpentier	Forsythe Racing	Reynard 2Ki Ford-Cosworth	1:33.798
12	(Sweden)	Kenny Bräck	Team Rahal	Reynard 2Ki Ford-Cosworth	1:33.856
13	(Canada)	Alex Tagliani	Forsythe Racing	Reynard 2Ki Ford-Cosworth	1:34.024
14	(Spain)	Oriol Servià	PPI Motorsports	Reynard 2Ki Toyota	1:34.059
15	(Italy)	Max Papis	Team Rahal	Reynard 2Ki Ford-Cosworth	1:34.132
16	(Mexico)	Michel Jourdain Jr.	Bettenhausen Racing	Lola 2K/00 Mercedes-Benz	1:34.282
17	(Mexico)	Adrián Fernández	Patrick Racing	Reynard 2Ki Ford-Cosworth	1:34.333
18	(Brazil)	Maurício Gugelmin	PacWest Racing	Reynard 2Ki Mercedes-Benz	1:34.514
19	(United States)	Alex Barron	Dale Coyne Racing	Lola 2K/00 Ford-Cosworth	1:34.558
20	(Brazil)	Roberto Moreno	Patrick Racing	Reynard 2Ki Ford-Cosworth	1:34.835
21	(Japan)	Shinji Nakano	Walker Racing	Reynard 2Ki Honda	1:34.972
22	(United Kingdom)	Mark Blundell	PacWest Racing	Reynard 2Ki Mercedes-Benz	1:35.399
23	(Brazil)	Tarso Marques	Dale Coyne Racing	Swift 011.c Ford-Cosworth	1:35.668
24	(Australia)	Jason Bright	Della Penna Motorsports	Reynard 2Ki Toyota	1:36.432
25	(Brazil)	Luiz Garcia Jr.	Arciero Racing	Reynard 2Ki Mercedes-Benz	1:38.689

== Race ==
Pos	No	Driver	Team	Laps	Time/retired	Grid	Points
1	40	(Mexico) Adrián Fernández	Patrick Racing	59	2:01:14.605	17	21
2	8	(Sweden) Kenny Bräck	Team Rahal	59	+0.3 secs	12	16
3	12	(United States) Jimmy Vasser	Chip Ganassi Racing	59	+4.0 secs	5	14
4	97	(Brazil) Cristiano da Matta	PPI Motorsports	59	+4.8 secs	10	12
5	32	(Canada) Patrick Carpentier	Forsythe Racing	59	+5.2 secs	11	10
6	3	(Brazil) Hélio Castroneves	Team Penske	59	+10.3 secs	8	8
7	16	(Mexico) Michel Jourdain Jr.	Bettenhausen Racing	59	+11.0 secs	16	6
8	55	(Brazil) Tony Kanaan	Mo Nunn Racing	59	+15.8 secs	7	5
9	96	(Spain) Oriol Servià	PPI Motorsports	59	+18.2 secs	14	
10	17	(Brazil) Maurício Gugelmin	PacWest Racing	59	+18.6 secs	18	3
11	18	(United Kingdom) Mark Blundell	PacWest Racing	59	+18.7 secs	22	2
12	25	(Brazil) Luiz Garcia Jr.	Arciero Racing	58	+ 1 lap	25	1
13	34	(Brazil) Tarso Marques	Dale Coyne Racing	57	+ 2 laps	23	
14	19	(United States) Alex Barron	Dale Coyne Racing	54	Mechanical	19	
15	11	(Brazil) Christian Fittipaldi	Newman-Haas Racing	51	Off course	15	
16	7	(Italy) Max Papis	Team Rahal	48	Contact	15	
17	26	(Canada) Paul Tracy	Team Green	47	Contact	4	
18	10	(Australia) Jason Bright	Della Penna Motorsports	44	Contact	24	
19	20	(Brazil) Roberto Moreno	Patrick Racing	43	Contact	20	
20	6	(United States) Michael Andretti	Newman-Haas Racing	38	Fire	6	
21	5	(Japan) Shinji Nakano	Walker Racing	38	Mechanical	21	
22	33	(Canada) Alex Tagliani	Forsythe Racing	36	Out Of Fuel	13	
23	2	(Brazil) Gil de Ferran	Team Penske	1	Contact	2	
24	1	(Colombia) Juan Pablo Montoya	Chip Ganassi Racing	0	Contact	1	1
25	27	(United Kingdom) Dario Franchitti	Team Green	0	Contact	3	

== Caution flags ==
Laps	Cause
2–4	Contact Montoya (1), de Ferran (2), Franchitti (27)
12–14	Off course Tracy (26)
40–44	Mechanical Nakano (5)
45–48	Contact Moreno (20)
49–52	Contact Tracy (26), Servià (96)

== See also ==
- 2000 Honda Indy 300

== Notes ==
Laps	Leader
1–11	Paul Tracy
12–23	Michael Andretti
24–25	Jimmy Vasser
26–35	Kenny Bräck
36–36	Alex Tagliani
37–42	Jimmy Vasser
43–59	Adrián Fernández

Driver	Laps led
Adrián Fernández	17
Michael Andretti	12
Paul Tracy	11
Kenny Bräck	10
Jimmy Vasser	8
Alex Tagliani	1

- Average Speed 81.607 mph

Previous race: 2000 Texaco Grand Prix of Houston	CART FedEx Championship Series; 2000 season	Next race: 2000 Marlboro 500
Previous race: 1999 Honda Indy 300	2000 Honda Indy 300	Next race: 2001 Honda Indy 300
