= 2000 CART FedEx Championship Series =

American motorsport season

2000 CART season
- FedEx Championship Series

Season
- Races: 20
- Start date: March 26
- End date: October 30

Awards
- Drivers' champion: (Brazil) Gil de Ferran
- Constructors' Cup: (United Kingdom) Reynard
- Manufacturers' Cup: (United States) / (United Kingdom) Ford-Cosworth
- Nations' Cup: Brazil
- Rookie of the Year: (Sweden) Kenny Bräck

The 2000 FedEx Championship Series season was the twenty-second in the Championship Auto Racing Teams (CART) era of American open-wheel car racing. It consisted of 20 races, beginning in Homestead, Florida on March 26, 2000 and concluding in Fontana, California on October 30, 2000. The FedEx Championship Series Drivers' Champion was Gil de Ferran. The Rookie of the Year was Kenny Bräck.

The relative decline of Chip Ganassi Racing and an atypical parity among the major engine and chassis builders led to the most wide-open championship race in the history of the series, with seven different winners in the first seven races of the year and 11 drivers winning a race. From 1997–1999, only two drivers came within 50 points of the champion, 9 would do so in 2000.

Penske Racing returned to prominence using Honda engines and abandoning their house chassis for a Reynard 2KI. Gil de Ferran and Helio Castroneves (the latter signed following the death of Greg Moore), combined for 5 wins, 4 of which were on the road courses the team had not been competitive on in their previous chassis and engine. Veterans Michael Andretti and Paul Tracy, who were 1 and 2 in the championship after the Vancouver round, would fall short after poor finishes down the stretch. Most surprising of all to observers was the return to prominence of Patrick Racing, with veterans Adrian Fernandez and Roberto Moreno finishing second and third respectively in the championship.

Off the track, while CART remained fiscally strong, anxiety regarding the series' decline in prominence led to the ouster of CEO Andrew Craig at the midpoint of the season, leading to his replacement by Bobby Rahal. The series left open the traditional Indianapolis 500 date of Memorial Day, allowing teams to enter the Indy Racing League-sanctioned race for the first time since 1995. Chip Ganassi Racing did so, with their driver Juan Pablo Montoya winning the race handily with purchased IRL equipment. While a competitive triumph for CART, Ganassi's efforts showed the continuing allure of the 500 for CART teams and their sponsors. 2000 would also be the final season for DaimlerChrysler via the Mercedes-Benz brand as an engine manufacturer, after DaimlerChrysler decided to shut down their CART program and coincidentally defected to the NASCAR Winston Cup Series via the Dodge brand in 2001.

== Drivers and constructors ==
The following teams and drivers competed in the 2000 CART Championship Series season. Five years after the return of Firestone, rival tire manufacturer Goodyear withdrew from CART and its rival the Indy Racing League and hence all cars would ran on Firestone Firehawk tires for the first time in history. All teams were based in the United States.

Team	Chassis	Engine	No	Drivers	Races	Primary Sponsors
Chip Ganassi Racing	Lola B2K/00	Toyota RV8E	1	(Colombia) Juan Pablo Montoya	All	Target
Chip Ganassi Racing	Lola B2K/00	Toyota RV8E	12	(United States) Jimmy Vasser	All	Target
Team Penske	Reynard 2KI	Honda HR-0	2	(Brazil) Gil de Ferran	All	Marlboro
Team Penske	Reynard 2KI	Honda HR-0	3	(Brazil) Hélio Castroneves	All	Marlboro
Walker Motorsport	Reynard 2KI	Honda HR-0	5	(Japan) Shinji Nakano R	1, 4, 6–20	Avex
Walker Motorsport	Reynard 2KI	Honda HR-0	5	(United States) Bryan Herta	2–3	Avex
Newman/Haas Racing	Lola B2K/00	Ford-Cosworth XF	6	(United States) Michael Andretti	All	Texaco-Havoline
Newman/Haas Racing	Lola B2K/00	Ford-Cosworth XF	11	(Brazil) Christian Fittipaldi	All	Big Kmart
Team Rahal	Reynard 2KI	Ford-Cosworth XF	7	(Italy) Max Papis	All	Miller Lite
Team Rahal	Reynard 2KI	Ford-Cosworth XF	8	(Sweden) Kenny Bräck R	All	Shell
Team Rahal	Reynard 2KI	Ford-Cosworth XF	91	(United States) Casey Mears R	20	WorldCom
Della Penna Motorsports	Reynard 2KI	Toyota RV8E	10	(Argentina) Norberto Fontana R	1–5, 7–10	Video Match 9 DirecTV 11
Della Penna Motorsports	Reynard 2KI	Toyota RV8E	10	(United States) Memo Gidley	11–18, 20	Video Match 9 DirecTV 11
Della Penna Motorsports	Reynard 2KI	Toyota RV8E	10	(Australia) Jason Bright R	19	Video Match 9 DirecTV 11
Bettenhausen Racing	Lola B2K/00	Mercedes IC 108E	16	(Mexico) Michel Jourdain Jr.	All	Herdez
PacWest Racing	Reynard 2KI	Mercedes IC 108E	17	(Brazil) Maurício Gugelmin	All	Nextel
PacWest Racing	Reynard 2KI	Mercedes IC 108E	18	(United Kingdom) Mark Blundell	All	Motorola
Dale Coyne Racing	Lola B2K/00	Ford-Cosworth XF	19	(Japan) Takuya Kurosawa R	1–11	MTCI 6 Sports Today 14
Dale Coyne Racing	Lola B2K/00	Ford-Cosworth XF	19	(Brazil) Gualter Salles	12–14	MTCI 6 Sports Today 14
Dale Coyne Racing	Lola B2K/00	Ford-Cosworth XF	19	(United States) Alex Barron	15–20	MTCI 6 Sports Today 14
Dale Coyne Racing	Lola B2K/00	Ford-Cosworth XF	34	(Brazil) Gualter Salles	1–3, 5	Dale Coyne Racing
Dale Coyne Racing	Swift 011.c	Ford-Cosworth XF	34	(Brazil) Tarso Marques	4–20	Panasonic
Patrick Racing	Reynard 2KI	Ford-Cosworth XF	20	(Brazil) Roberto Moreno	All	Visteon
Patrick Racing	Reynard 2KI	Ford-Cosworth XF	40	(Mexico) Adrián Fernández	All	Tecate
Arciero Racing	Reynard 2KI	Mercedes IC 108E	25	(Brazil) Luiz Garcia Jr.	All	Hollywood Cigarettes
Team Green	Reynard 2KI	Honda HR-0	26	(Canada) Paul Tracy	All	KOOL
Team Green	Reynard 2KI	Honda HR-0	27	(United Kingdom) Dario Franchitti	All	KOOL
Forsythe Racing	Reynard 2KI	Ford-Cosworth XF	32	(Canada) Patrick Carpentier	1, 5–20	Player's
Forsythe Racing	Reynard 2KI	Ford-Cosworth XF	32	(United States) Memo Gidley	2–4	Player's
Forsythe Racing	Reynard 2KI	Ford-Cosworth XF	33	(Canada) Alex Tagliani R	All	Player's
Forsythe Racing	Reynard 2KI	Ford-Cosworth XF	77	(United States) Bryan Herta	16	Rockingham Motor Speedway
Mo Nunn Racing	Reynard 2KI	Mercedes IC 108E	55	(Brazil) Tony Kanaan	1–7, 11–20	Hollywood Cigarettes
Mo Nunn Racing	Reynard 2KI	Mercedes IC 108E	55	(United States) Bryan Herta	8–10	Hollywood Cigarettes
PPI Motorsports	Reynard 2KI	Toyota RV8E	96	(Spain) Oriol Servià R	All	Telefónica
PPI Motorsports	Reynard 2KI	Toyota RV8E	97	(Brazil) Cristiano da Matta	All	Pioneer

R Eligible for Rookie of the Year

== Schedule ==
Icon	Legend
O	Oval/Speedway
R	Road course
S	Street circuit

Rnd	Date	Race Name	Circuit	City/Location
1	March 26	(United States) Marlboro Grand Prix of Miami	O Homestead-Miami Speedway	Homestead, Florida
2	April 16	(United States) Toyota Grand Prix of Long Beach	S Streets of Long Beach	Long Beach, California
3	April 30	(Brazil) Rio 200	O Autódromo de Jacarepaguá	Jacarepagua, Rio de Janeiro, Brazil
4	May 14*	(Japan) Firestone Firehawk 500	O Twin Ring Motegi	Motegi, Tochigi, Japan
5	May 27^{†}	(United States) Bosch Spark Plug Grand Prix	O Nazareth Speedway	Nazareth, Pennsylvania
6	June 5*	(United States) Miller Lite 225	O Milwaukee Mile	West Allis, Wisconsin
7	June 18	(United States) Tenneco Automotive Grand Prix of Detroit	S The Raceway on Belle Isle Park	Detroit, Michigan
8	June 25	(United States) Freightliner/G. I. Joe's 200	R Portland International Raceway	Portland, Oregon
9	July 2	(United States) Marconi Grand Prix of Cleveland	R Cleveland Burke Lakefront Airport	Cleveland, Ohio
10	July 16	(Canada) Molson Indy Toronto	S Exhibition Place	Toronto, Ontario
11	July 23	(United States) Michigan 500	O Michigan Speedway	Brooklyn, Michigan
12	July 30	(United States) Target Grand Prix of Chicago	O Chicago Motor Speedway	Cicero, Illinois
13	August 13	(United States) Miller Lite 200	R Mid-Ohio Sports Car Course	Lexington, Ohio
14	August 20	(United States) Motorola 220	R Road America	Elkhart Lake, Wisconsin
15	September 3	(Canada) Molson Indy Vancouver	S Concord Pacific Place	Vancouver, British Columbia
16	September 10	(United States) Honda Grand Prix of Monterey	R Laguna Seca Raceway	Monterey, California
17	September 17	(United States) Motorola 300	O Gateway International Raceway	Madison, Illinois
18	October 1	(United States) Texaco/Havoline Grand Prix of Houston	S George R. Brown Convention Center	Houston, Texas
19	October 15	(Australia) Honda Indy 300	S Surfers Paradise Street Circuit	Surfers Paradise, Queensland, Australia
20	October 29–30*	(United States) Marlboro 500	O California Speedway	Fontana, California

^{†} The Nazareth round was initially scheduled to be the second round on April 9, 2000, but snow caused the race's postponement.
Motegi was scheduled to be on May 13, and Milwaukee was scheduled to be on June 4. Both were postponed due to rain.
Fontana was scheduled for October 29, but during a caution on lap 22 for Cristiano da Matta crashing, rain began to fall and the remainder of the race was postponed to the next day.

== Results ==
Round	Race	Pole position	Fastest lap	Lead Most Laps	Race Winner				Race Time	Report
Round	Race	Pole position	Fastest lap	Lead Most Laps	Driver	Team	Chassis	Engine	Race Time	Report
1	(United States) Homestead	(Brazil) Gil de Ferran	(Colombia) Juan Pablo Montoya	(Brazil) Gil de Ferran	(Italy) Max Papis	Team Rahal	Reynard 2KI	Ford-Cosworth XF	1:22:01	Report
2	(United States) Long Beach	(Brazil) Gil de Ferran	(Brazil) Gil de Ferran	(Brazil) Gil de Ferran	(Canada) Paul Tracy	Team Green	Reynard 2KI	Honda HR-0	1:57:11	Report
3	(Brazil) Rio	(Canada) Alex Tagliani	(Canada) Alex Tagliani	(Canada) Alex Tagliani	(Mexico) Adrián Fernández	Patrick Racing	Reynard 2KI	Ford-Cosworth XF	1:37:12	Report
4	(Japan) Motegi	(Colombia) Juan Pablo Montoya	(Colombia) Juan Pablo Montoya	(Colombia) Juan Pablo Montoya	(United States) Michael Andretti	Newman/Haas Racing	Lola B2K/00	Ford-Cosworth XF	1:58:52	Report
5	(United States) Nazareth	(Colombia) Juan Pablo Montoya	(Brazil) Hélio Castroneves	(Colombia) Juan Pablo Montoya	(Brazil) Gil de Ferran	Team Penske	Reynard 2KI	Honda HR-0	2:06:10	Report
6	(United States) Milwaukee	(Colombia) Juan Pablo Montoya	(Colombia) Juan Pablo Montoya	(Colombia) Juan Pablo Montoya	(Colombia) Juan Pablo Montoya	Chip Ganassi Racing	Lola B2K/00	Toyota RV8E	1:37:38	Report
7	(United States) Belle Isle	(Colombia) Juan Pablo Montoya	(Brazil) Hélio Castroneves	(Colombia) Juan Pablo Montoya	(Brazil) Hélio Castroneves	Team Penske	Reynard 2KI	Honda HR-0	2:01:23	Report
8	(United States) Portland	(Brazil) Hélio Castroneves	(Sweden) Kenny Bräck	(Brazil) Hélio Castroneves	(Brazil) Gil de Ferran	Team Penske	Reynard 2KI	Honda HR-0	2:00:46	Report
9	(United States) Cleveland	(Brazil) Roberto Moreno	(Colombia) Juan Pablo Montoya	(Brazil) Roberto Moreno	(Brazil) Roberto Moreno	Patrick Racing	Reynard 2KI	Ford-Cosworth XF	1:52:12	Report
10	(Canada) Toronto	(Brazil) Hélio Castroneves	(United States) Michael Andretti	(Brazil) Cristiano da Matta	(United States) Michael Andretti	Newman/Haas Racing	Lola B2K/00	Ford-Cosworth XF	2:00:02	Report
11	(United States) Michigan	(Canada) Paul Tracy	(Colombia) Juan Pablo Montoya	(Brazil) Hélio Castroneves	(Colombia) Juan Pablo Montoya	Chip Ganassi Racing	Lola B2K/00	Toyota RV8E	2:48:49	Report
12	(United States) Chicago	(Colombia) Juan Pablo Montoya	(Mexico) Adrián Fernández	(Colombia) Juan Pablo Montoya	(Brazil) Cristiano da Matta	PPI Motorsports	Reynard 2KI	Toyota RV8E	2:01:23	Report
13	(United States) Mid-Ohio	(Brazil) Gil de Ferran	(United Kingdom) Dario Franchitti	(Brazil) Hélio Castroneves	(Brazil) Hélio Castroneves	Team Penske	Reynard 2KI	Honda HR-0	1:44:59	Report
14	(United States) Road America	(United Kingdom) Dario Franchitti	(Canada) Paul Tracy	(Canada) Alex Tagliani	(Canada) Paul Tracy	Team Green	Reynard 2KI	Honda HR-0	1:37:53	Report
15	(Canada) Vancouver	(United Kingdom) Dario Franchitti	(Colombia) Juan Pablo Montoya	(United Kingdom) Dario Franchitti	(Canada) Paul Tracy	Team Green	Reynard 2KI	Honda HR-0	1:53:06	Report
16	(United States) Laguna Seca	(Brazil) Hélio Castroneves	(Brazil) Gil de Ferran	(Brazil) Hélio Castroneves	(Brazil) Hélio Castroneves	Team Penske	Reynard 2KI	Honda HR-0	1:46:11	Report
17	(United States) Gateway	(Colombia) Juan Pablo Montoya	(Canada) Patrick Carpentier	(United States) Michael Andretti	(Colombia) Juan Pablo Montoya	Chip Ganassi Racing	Lola B2K/00	Toyota RV8E	1:55:38	Report
18	(United States) Houston	(Brazil) Gil de Ferran	(United States) Michael Andretti	(Brazil) Gil de Ferran	(United States) Jimmy Vasser	Chip Ganassi Racing	Lola B2K/00	Toyota RV8E	1:59:02	Report
19	(Australia) Surfers Paradise	(Colombia) Juan Pablo Montoya	(United States) Jimmy Vasser	(Mexico) Adrián Fernández	(Mexico) Adrián Fernández	Patrick Racing	Reynard 2KI	Ford-Cosworth XF	2:01:14	Report
20	(United States) Fontana	(Brazil) Gil de Ferran	(Brazil) Hélio Castroneves	(Sweden) Kenny Bräck	(Brazil) Christian Fittipaldi	Newman/Haas Racing	Lola B2K/00	Ford-Cosworth XF	3:38:04	Report

=== Final driver standings ===
Pos	Driver	HOM (United States)	LBH (United States)	RIO (Brazil)	MOT (Japan)	NAZ (United States)	MIL (United States)	BEL (United States)	POR (United States)	CLE (United States)	TOR (Canada)	MIS (United States)	CMS (United States)	MOH (United States)	ROA (United States)	VAN (Canada)	LAG (United States)	GTW (United States)	HOU (United States)	SUR (Australia)	CAL (United States)	Pts
1	(Brazil) Gil de Ferran	**6***	**7***	17	9	1	12	9	1	14	6	18	3	**2**	25	5	2	8	**3***	23	**3**	168
2	(Mexico) Adrián Fernández	21	24	1	10	5	8	21	12	7	2	6	5	6	2	3	12	10	7	1*	5	158
3	(Brazil) Roberto Moreno	2	9	6	3	14	5	17	2	**1***	13	23	6	11	4	10	25	3	11	19	2	147
4	(Sweden) Kenny Bräck RY	18	17	10	5	3	4	24	6	2	10	22	4	5	3	9	5	11	15	2	13*	135
5	(Canada) Paul Tracy	3	1	3	6	10	15	DSQ	18	19	3	**7**	19	16	1	1	11	18	4	17	24	134
6	(United States) Jimmy Vasser	4	3	2	21	7	13	7	24	8	9	21	8	21	5	6	8	7	1	3	22	131
7	(Brazil) Hélio Castroneves	25	2	24	13	16	16	1	**7***	21	**16**	5*	21	1*	9	20	**1***	9	5	6	9	129
8	(United States) Michael Andretti	22	14	9	1	6	2	13	4	4	1	2	2	8	19	12	14	20*	13	20	19	127
9	(Colombia) Juan Pablo Montoya	23	19	22	**7***	**4***	**1***	**18***	17	6	24	1	**12***	24	16	17	6	**1**	2	**24**	10	126
10	(Brazil) Cristiano da Matta	12	25	4	4	13	14	23	5	3	4*	17	1	17	13	7	15	4	14	4	25	112
11	(Canada) Patrick Carpentier	5				21	3	5	10	5	7	4	14	7	21	24	9	2	19	5	14	101
12	(Brazil) Christian Fittipaldi	7	18	5	11	11	9	19	3	17	17	14	Wth	3	15	4	10	12	6	15	1	96
13	(United Kingdom) Dario Franchitti	11	23	11	2	23	6	4	9	13	25	3	20	22	**12**	**2***	3	24	25	25	23	92
14	(Italy) Max Papis	1	20	16	8	22	7	2	25	18	8	9	24	4	7	8	16	6	24	16	12	88
15	(Spain) Oriol Servià R	19	6	25	24	9	19	3	8	23	11	8	15	10	10	11	17	5	9	9^{1}	20	60
16	(Canada) Alex Tagliani R	9	4	**13***	15	19	22	6	13	16	5	16	9	9	14*	18	23	14	16	22	6	53
17	(Brazil) Maurício Gugelmin	16	10	21	22	2	11	16	19	10	15	13	7	20	17	21	7	19	23	10	17	39
18	(United States) Bryan Herta		5	20					16	9	18						4					26
19	(Brazil) Tony Kanaan	10	16	18	16	8	10	DNS				24	16	13	8	14	22	13	10	8	18	24
20	(United States) Memo Gidley		21	8	18							10	10	12	6	16	19	22	21		21	20
21	(United Kingdom) Mark Blundell	13	8	7	19	17	17	11	20	12	22	19	23	14	11	25	13	23	20	11	15	18
22	(Mexico) Michel Jourdain Jr.	14	11	15	12	18	18	8	23	22	19	15	11	15	18	23	24	16	18	7	11	18
23	(United States) Casey Mears R																				4	12
24	(Japan) Shinji Nakano R	8			14		23	15	11	15	14	20	13	19	22	19	26	21	8	21	16	12
25	(Brazil) Tarso Marques				17	12	20	10	15	24	21	12	18	18	23	22	18	15	17	13	7	11
26	(United States) Alex Barron															13	21	17	12	14	8	6
27	(Brazil) Luiz Garcia Jr.	17	12	12	23	15	21	22	14	20	12	11	17	25	24	15	20	25	22	12	DNS	6
28	(Argentina) Norberto Fontana R	15	15	23	Wth	20		14	21	11	20											2
29	(Japan) Takuya Kurosawa R	24	13	19	20	DNS	Wth	12	22	25	23	DNS										1
30	(Brazil) Gualter Salles	20	22	14		Wth							22	23	20							0
31	(Australia) Jason Bright R																			18		0
Pos	Driver	HOM (United States)	LBH (United States)	RIO (Brazil)	MOT (Japan)	NAZ (United States)	MIL (United States)	BEL (United States)	POR (United States)	CLE (United States)	TOR (Canada)	MIS (United States)	CMS (United States)	MOH (United States)	ROA (United States)	VAN (Canada)	LAG (United States)	GTW (United States)	HOU (United States)	SUR (Australia)	CAL (United States)	Pts

Color	Result
Gold	Winner
Silver	2nd place
Bronze	3rd place
Green	4th–6th place
Light Blue	7th–12th place
Dark Blue	Finished (Outside Top 12)
Purple	Did not finish
Red	Did not qualify (DNQ)
Brown	Withdrawn (Wth)
Black	Disqualified (DSQ)
White	Did not start (DNS)
Blank	Did not participate (DNP)
Blank	Not competing

**In-line notation**
**Bold**	Pole position
Italics	Ran fastest race lap
*	Led most race laps
RY	Rookie of the Year
R	Rookie

1. Oriol Servià was penalized 4 points for rough driving in Surfers Paradise.

=== Nations' Cup ===
- Top result per race counts towards Nations' Cup.

Pos	Country	HOM (United States)	LBH (United States)	RIO (Brazil)	MOT (Japan)	NAZ (United States)	MIL (United States)	BEL (United States)	POR (United States)	CLE (United States)	TOR (Canada)	MIS (United States)	CMS (United States)	MOH (United States)	ROA (United States)	VAN (Canada)	LAG (United States)	GTW (United States)	HOU (United States)	SUR (Australia)	CAL (United States)	Pts
1	Brazil	2	2	4	3	1	5	1	1	1	4	5	1	1	4	5	1	3	3	4	1	332
2	United States	4	3	2	1	6	2	7	4	4	1	2	2	8	5	6	8	7	1	3	4	256
3	Canada	3	1	3	6	10	3	5	10	5	3	4	9	7	1	1	9	2	4	5	6	226
4	Mexico	14	11	1	10	5	8	8	12	7	2	6	5	6	2	3	12	10	7	1	5	165
5	Sweden	18	17	10	5	3	4	24	6	2	10	22	4	5	3	9	5	11	15	2	13	135
6	Colombia	23	19	22	7	4	1	18	17	6	24	1	12	24	16	17	6	1	2	24	10	126
7	Scotland	11	23	11	2	23	6	4	9	13	25	3	20	22	12	2	3	24	25	25	23	92
8	Italy	1	20	16	8	22	7	2	25	18	8	9	24	4	7	8	16	8	24	16	12	88
9	Spain	19	6	25	24	9	19	3	8	23	11	8	15	10	10	11	17	5	9	9	20	64
10	England	13	8	7	19	17	17	11	20	12	22	19	23	14	11	25	13	23	20	11	15	18
11	Japan	8	13	19	14	DNS	23	12	11	15	14	20	13	19	22	19	26	21	8	21	16	13
12	Argentina	15	15	23	Wth	20	Wth	14	21	11	20											2
13	Australia																			18		0
Pos	Country	HOM (United States)	LBH (United States)	RIO (Brazil)	MOT (Japan)	NAZ (United States)	MIL (United States)	BEL (United States)	POR (United States)	CLE (United States)	TOR (Canada)	MIS (United States)	CMS (United States)	MOH (United States)	ROA (United States)	VAN (Canada)	LAG (United States)	GTW (United States)	HOU (United States)	SUR (Australia)	CAL (United States)	Pts

=== Chassis Constructors' Cup ===
Pos	Chassis	Pts	Wins
1	(United Kingdom) Reynard 2KI	393	13
2	(United Kingdom) Lola B2K/00	313	7
Pos	Chassis	Pts	Wins

=== Engine Manufacturers' Cup ===
Pos	Engine	Pts	Wins
1	(United States) (United Kingdom) Ford-Cosworth XF	334	7
2	(Japan) Honda HR-0	314	8
3	(Japan) Toyota RV8E	275	5
4	(Germany) Mercedes IC 108E	66	0
Pos	Engine	Pts	Wins

== See also ==
- 2000 Toyota Atlantic Championship season
- 2000 Indianapolis 500
- 2000 Indy Racing League
- 2000 Indy Lights season

== Bibliography ==
- Shaw, Jeremy, ed. (2001). Autocourse CART Official Yearbook 2000-2001. Richmond, Surrey: Hazleton Publishing. ISBN 978-1-874557-99-9.
