= 2002 Molson Indy Vancouver =

Motor car race held in Vancouver, Canada

(Canada) 2002 Molson Indy Vancouver
Race details
- Race 10 of 19 in the 2002 CART season
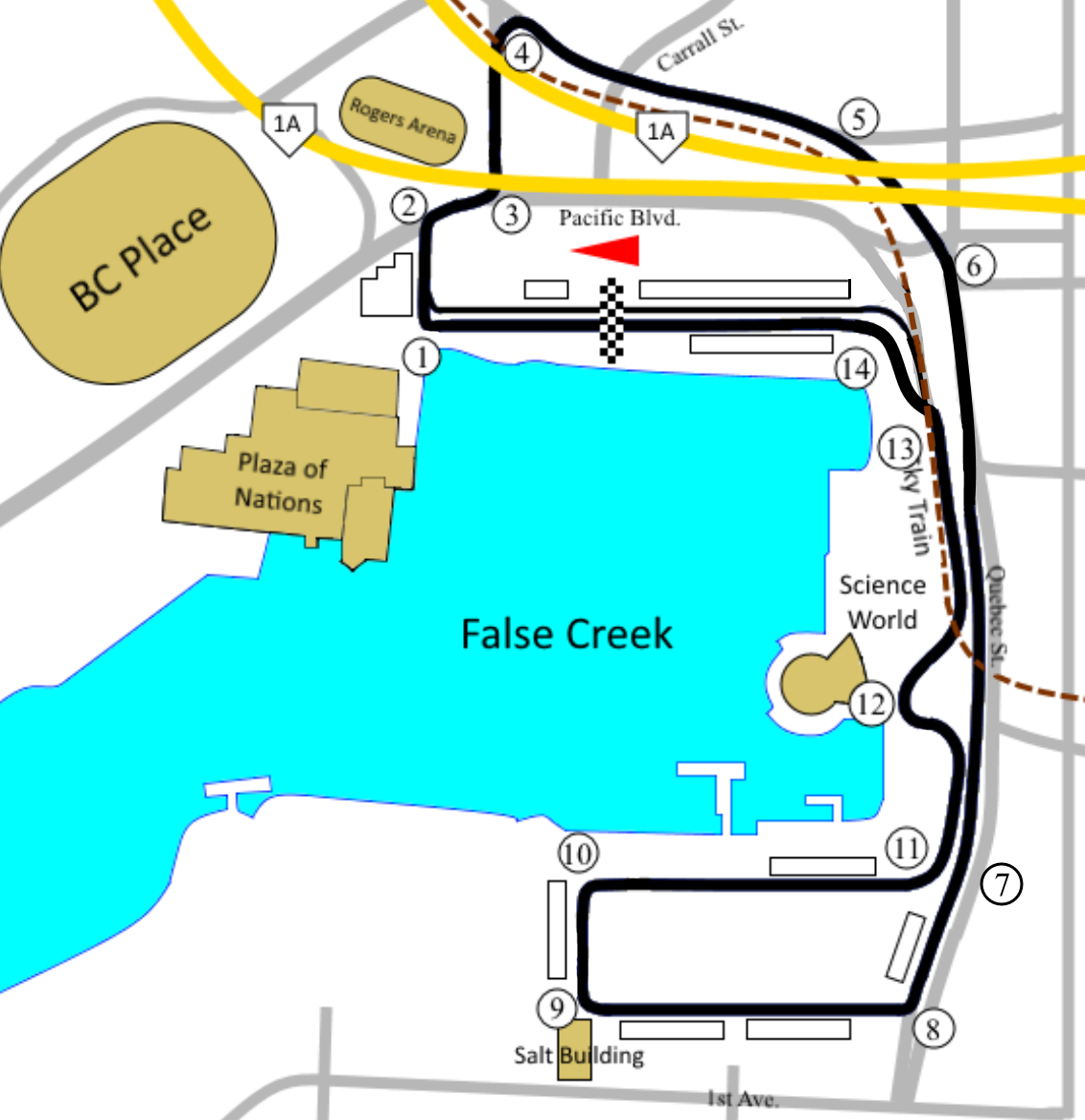
- Layout of Concord Pacific Place
- Date: July 28, 2002
- Official name: Molson Indy Vancouver
- Location: Concord Pacific Place, Vancouver, British Columbia, Canada
- Course: Temporary street course 1.781 mi / 2.866 km
- Distance: 100 laps 178.100 mi / 286.600 km
- Weather: Partly cloudy, mild

Pole position
- Driver: (Brazil) Cristiano da Matta (Newman/Haas Racing)
- Time: 1:00.339

Fastest lap
- Driver: (Brazil) Cristiano da Matta (Newman/Haas Racing)
- Time: 1:01.633 (on lap 25 of 100)

Podium
- First: (United Kingdom) Dario Franchitti (Team Green)
- Second: (Canada) Paul Tracy (Team Green)
- Third: (Brazil) Tony Kanaan (Mo Nunn Racing)

The 2002 Molson Indy Vancouver was a Championship Auto Racing Teams (CART) motor race held on July 28, 2002, at Concord Pacific Place in Vancouver, British Columbia, Canada in front of 66,134 spectators. It was the tenth round of the 2002 CART FedEx Championship Series and the 13th running of the event. Dario Franchitti of Team Green won the 100-lap race from the third starting position. His teammate Paul Tracy finished second and Mo Nunn Racing driver Tony Kanaan came in third.

Cristiano da Matta entered the race with the Drivers' Championship lead, as did Toyota in the Manufacturers' Championship. Despite a poor performance in the first qualifying session on Friday, da Matta rebounded a day later to clinch the pole position by recording the fastest lap time on Saturday. He led the first 35 laps before making a pit stop. Tracy assumed the lead but needed to pit twice more, while his other competitors only needed one more stop. Da Matta reclaimed the lead once Tracy pitted on lap 64, but suffered a gearbox failure and subsequently retired from the race, allowing Franchitti to assume the lead. The race was briefly paused for a lap-91 crash which left Adrián Fernández with a contused hip. Franchitti led the final five-lap stint to achieve his eighth CART victory, which he dedicated to his late friend Greg Moore.

Da Matta continued to hold the lead in the Drivers' Championship, but Franchitti's win meant that he was promoted to second place in the standings and reeled in on da Matta. Michel Jourdain Jr., who scored points for the tenth successive race, tied Bruno Junqueira for fourth place. Though their advantage over Honda had also slightly diminshed, Toyota still led the Manufacturers' Championship with nine races left in the season.

== Background ==
The Molson Indy Vancouver was an annual open-wheel car race that was introduced to the Championship Auto Racing Teams (CART) schedule in 1990. The 13th edition of the event was included as the tenth of 19 races in CART's 2002 FedEx Championship Series and the second of three races to be held in Canada. It was held at Concord Pacific Place, a 12-turn, 1.781 mi (2.866 km) street circuit, in Vancouver, British Columbia, on Sunday, July 28, 2002. The event was moved from its traditional date on Labor Day weekend to make way for the returning Grand Prix of Denver. Heading into the race, Cristiano da Matta led the Drivers' Championship with 120 points, 50 more than Bruno Junqueira in second and a further six ahead of Dario Franchitti in third. Patrick Carpentier and Michel Jourdain Jr. both had 62 points each and were tied for fourth place. In the Manufacturers' Championship, Toyota led with 166 points, Honda was second on 134, and Ford-Cosworth held third on 114.

At the midway point of the 2002 season, da Matta was the clear favorite to win the title, having already achieved five wins (including a series record-matching four-win streak, which ended in the preceding round, the Grand Prix of Cleveland, due to a mechanical failure). He believed that several factors led to his dominance in the season, including his team, engines, chassis, and tires, and was excited to race at Vancouver again, as he considered it "one of my favorite race cities". Three-time Molson Indy Vancouver winner Michael Andretti was set to participate in his 300th CART race. He was pleased with his performance throughout the Cleveland race weekend and hoped to carry over what his team learned for Vancouver. After unwinding from his "emotional" win in the Grand Prix of Cleveland two weeks prior, Carpentier was excited to race at Vancouver in front of his Canadian fans.

A total of 18 cars were entered for the race, representing 12 different teams. There was one change of driver prior to the race. Townsend Bell was let go by Patrick Racing following a string of crashes which culminated in him being placed on indefinite probation by CART for crashing into Junqueira during the Molson Indy Toronto. For the next five races, he was replaced by Oriol Servià, who was previously left without a ride after PWR Championship Racing shut down early in the season. Jim McGee, general manager of Patrick Racing, described Bell as "cocky and aggressive – two things a good racer needs," but believed that he needed "a little more time."

== Practice and qualifying ==
=== Friday, July 26 ===
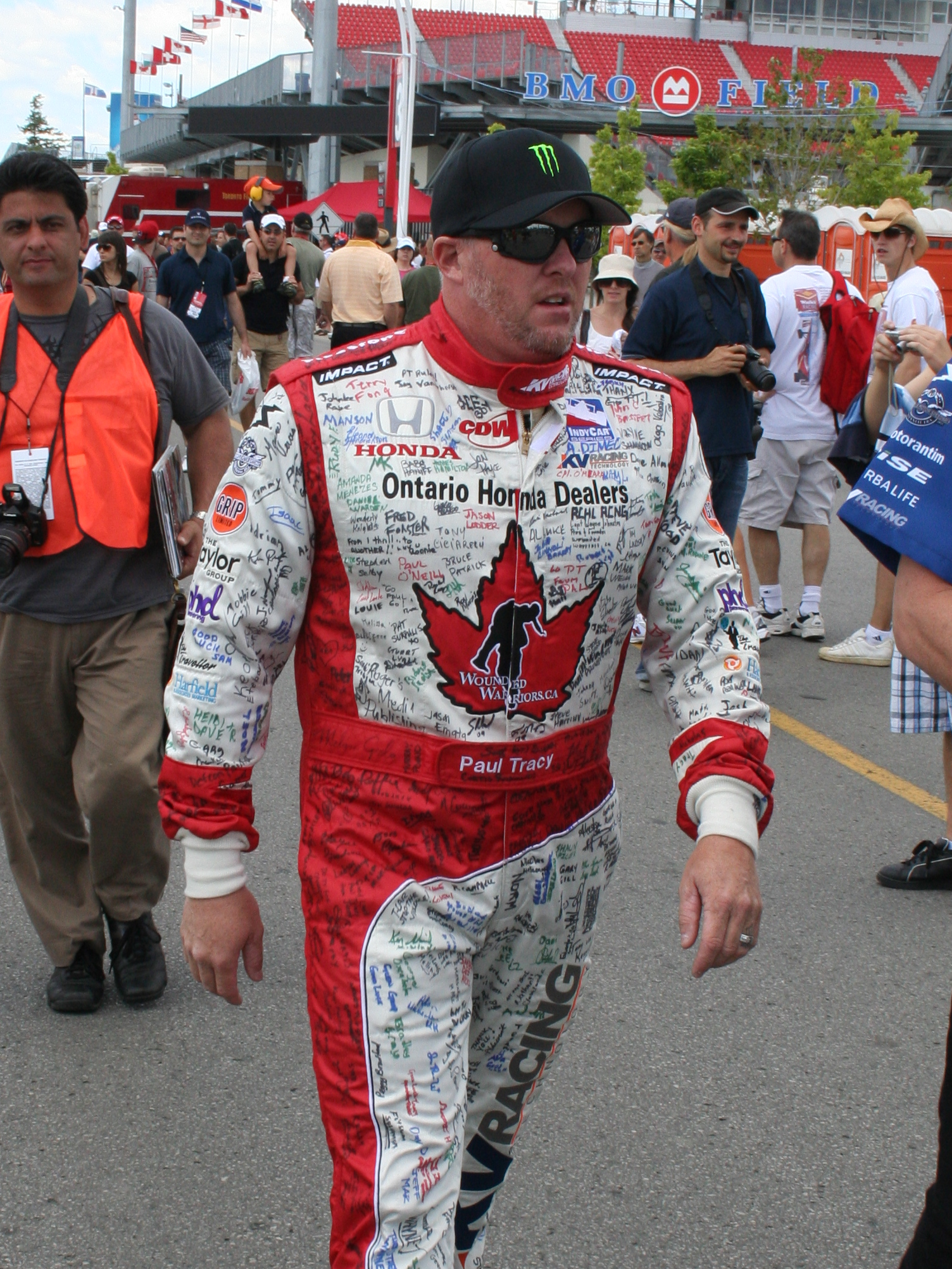
Paul Tracy (pictured in 2009) was fastest in Friday's qualifying session.

Two practice sessions preceded the race on Sunday, one 90-minute session on Friday and one 75-minute session on Saturday. Kenny Bräck led the practice session on Friday morning with a lap time of 1 minute and 1.359 seconds, followed by Franchitti, Paul Tracy, Christian Fittipaldi, and Jourdain. The session was stopped three times, first to repair a right-side tire wall at turn seven, second for Andretti spinning backwards into a left-side tire barrier in the first turn, and third for Jimmy Vasser stopping at turn eight.

Qualifying was split into two 60-minute sessions, one each on Friday and Saturday afternoon. A minimum of 45 minutes were guaranteed to be held under green-flag conditions, and each driver was allowed to complete up to 15 timed laps per session, with their fastest times determining their starting positions. The fastest driver(s) of each session would be awarded one championship point and ensured a front-row position on the starting grid. More than half of the session passed by before the drivers began recording their laps. Under cool and clear weather conditions, Tracy set the fastest time at 1 minute and 1.888 seconds. Dixon took second place with a lap that was 0.051 seconds and demoted his Chip Ganassi Racing teammate Bräck to third. Franchitti held the top position for much of the session's first half, but was dropped to fourth place by the end. Fittipaldi was unable to qualify higher than fifth because of the traffic that impeded him.

Jourdain and Andretti set the same lap time (1:02.195), but Jourdain was given the sixth position over Andretti in seventh because he recorded the time before Andretti finished his run. Forsythe Racing drivers Alex Tagliani and Carpentier took the next two positions, followed by Toranosuke Takagi in tenth, Shinji Nakano in 11th, and Tony Kanaan in 12th. Junqueira, 13th, brought the session to an early end when he bent his right-front suspension from clipping the turn five wall, causing him to crash into a left-side wall approaching turn six and slide across the track into the tire walls at the runoff area. Vasser topped the charts with a 1-minute, 1.979-second lap which would have placed him third, but on his next lap, he backed into a tire wall at the sixth corner. The resulting red flag from the incident meant that Vasser's best time was negated, dropping him to 14th. Servià, 15th, was hampered by a faulty shifter and the stoppage from Junqueira's crash. Da Matta took an unusually low 16th position because of fuel pressure issues in his primary car that his team attempted to fix throughout most of the session. By the time he switched to a backup car, all of the drivers were already on-track and obstructed him from putting down a quicker time. Mario Domínguez and Adrián Fernández were in the final two provisional positions.

=== Saturday, July 27 ===
On Saturday morning, Tracy recorded the quickest time of the weekend thus far at 1 minute and 0.778 seconds, with da Matta, Andretti, Fittipaldi, and Franchitti rounding out the top-five. Three incidents prompted red flags in the session: Junqueira backed into the left-side turn wall in turn one, Kanaan spun and stalled in the third turn, and Carpentier slammed the tire wall head-on in the exit of turn one, which ended the session with three minutes left.

"Yesterday was pretty difficult but today was much better. We decided to go out a bit early in the session because it was too crowded on the track yesterday to get a good lap. I had two clear laps and went for it with all the car had in it. This track is prone to have red flags so it was more important for us to go early when there were less cars on track and get into a rhythm than it was for us to wait until more grip was on the track and risk not getting a clear lap. Today's result was a real team effort after our problems yesterday. After Christian (Fittipaldi)'s team was finished working yesterday, they all came over and helped fix my car."

— Cristiano da Matta, after earning his fifth career pole position.

Overcast skies cooled the circuit, thus allowing 11 of the racers to post faster times in the second qualifying session than Tracy's time from the first session. As opposed to the day before, many drivers took to the track and completed their 15 allotted laps well before the session concluded. With a time of 1 minute, 0.339 seconds and a speed of 106.260 mph (171.009 km/h), da Matta secured his fifth pole position of his career and the season and broke the track record established by Franchitti in 2000. Tracy began his qualifying run later than most in order to take advantage of a clear track, but minor slipups caused him to fall short of da Matta's time by 0.163 seconds. Franchitti's team made adjustments to his car, but the alterations slowed his pace on his second run and prevented him from starting higher than third.

Dixon and Andretti equaled their best qualifying results of the season in fourth and fifth, respectively, Kanaan drove with an entirely different setup to improve from 12th to sixth, ahead of seventh-place Fittipaldi and eighth-place Tagliani. Vasser struggled with understeer and took ninth. Chip Ganassi Racing teammates Bräck and Junqueira started tenth and 12th, respectively, with the latter driving in his backup car because of his crash on Friday. They were split by Fernández, who took the 11th starting position despite enduring slight oversteer. Nakano, 13th, experienced a clutch failure that his team was unable to repair before the session ended. Takagi and Servià were in the next two positions. Carpentier, Domínguez, and Jourdain all withdrew their Friday qualifying times to improve their starting positions with their backup cars, but they wound up taking the final three positions.

=== Qualifying classification ===
Final qualifying results
| Pos | No. | Driver | Team | Q1 Time | Q2 Time | Best | Grid |
|---|---|---|---|---|---|---|---|
| 1 | 6 | (Brazil) Cristiano da Matta | Newman/Haas Racing | 1:03.020 | 1:00.339 | 1:00.339 | 1 |
| 2 | 26 | (Canada) Paul Tracy | Team Green | 1:01.888 | 1:00.502 | 1:00.502 | 2 |
| 3 | 27 | (United Kingdom) Dario Franchitti | Team Green | 1:01.990 | 1:00.559 | 1:00.559 | 3 |
| 4 | 44 | (New Zealand) Scott Dixon | Chip Ganassi Racing | 1:01.939 | 1:00.650 | 1:00.650 | 4 |
| 5 | 39 | (United States) Michael Andretti | Team Motorola | 1:02.195 | 1:00.749 | 1:00.749 | 5 |
| 6 | 10 | (Brazil) Tony Kanaan | Mo Nunn Racing | 1:02.509 | 1:00.763 | 1:00.763 | 6 |
| 7 | 11 | (Brazil) Christian Fittipaldi | Newman/Haas Racing | 1:02.179 | 1:00.779 | 1:00.779 | 7 |
| 8 | 33 | (Canada) Alex Tagliani | Forsythe Racing | 1:02.217 | 1:00.869 | 1:00.869 | 8 |
| 9 | 8 | (United States) Jimmy Vasser | Team Rahal | 1:02.754 | 1:00.942 | 1:00.942 | 9 |
| 10 | 12 | (Sweden) Kenny Bräck | Chip Ganassi Racing | 1:01.948 | 1:00.979 | 1:00.979 | 10 |
| 11 | 51 | (Mexico) Adrian Fernández | Fernández Racing | 1:03.407 | 1:01.050 | 1:01.050 | 11 |
| 12 | 4 | (Brazil) Bruno Junqueira | Chip Ganassi Racing | 1:02.602 | 1:01.194 | 1:01.194 | 12 |
| 13 | 52 | (Japan) Shinji Nakano | Fernández Racing | 1:02.470 | 1:01.249 | 1:01.249 | 13 |
| 14 | 5 | (Japan) Toranosuke Takagi | Walker Racing | 1:02.340 | 1:01.411 | 1:01.411 | 14 |
| 15 | 20 | (Spain) Oriol Servià | Patrick Racing | 1:02.912 | 1:01.431 | 1:01.431 | 15 |
| 16 | 32 | (Canada) Patrick Carpentier | Forsythe Racing | 1:02.323 | 1:01.471 | 1:01.471 | 16 |
| 17 | 55 | (Mexico) Mario Domínguez | Herdez Competition | 1:03.081 | 1:01.499 | 1:01.499 | 17 |
| 18 | 9 | (Mexico) Michel Jourdain Jr. | Team Rahal | 1:02.195 | 1:01.740 | 1:01.740 | 18 |

== Warm-up ==
The drivers took to the track at 9:30 a.m. Pacific Daylight Time (UTC−07:00) for a 30-minute warm-up session under partly cloudy skies. Fittipaldi was fastest with a 1-minute, 2.047-second lap, outpacing Newman/Haas Racing teammate da Matta, Bräck, Jourdain, and Nakano. Servià caused the only stoppage of the session when he stalled after spinning in the second turn.

== Race ==
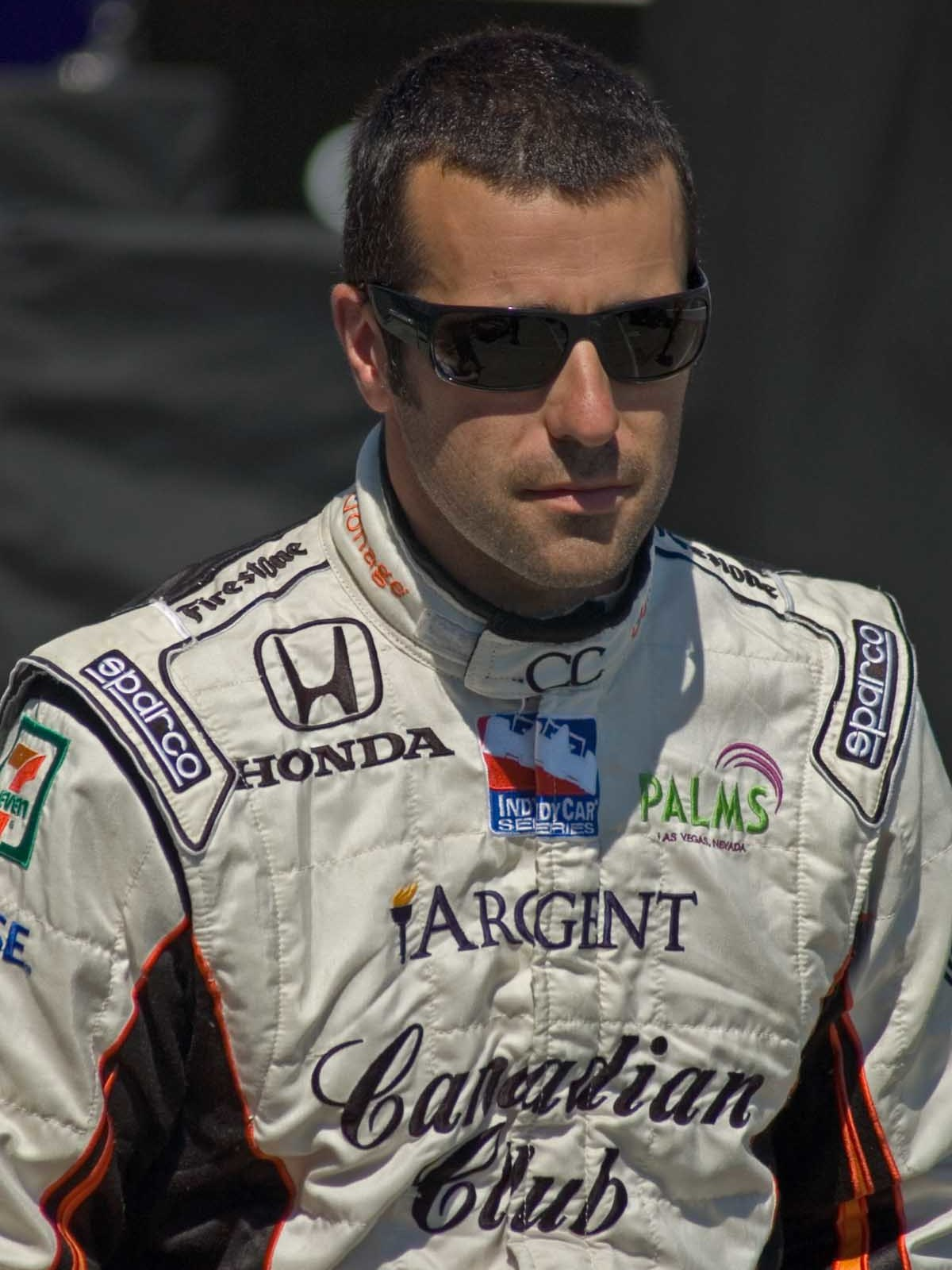
Dario Franchitti (pictured in 2007) earned his eighth win in CART.

The weather conditions at the circuit prior to the race were partly cloudy, with an air temperature of 68 to 72 °F (20 to 22 °C) and a track temperature of 81 to 102 °F (27 to 39 °C). The race was attended by 66,134 spectators and scheduled to last 100 laps over a distance of 178.1 miles (286.6 km). CART required all drivers to make pit stops after completing a maximum stint of 32 laps. During the parade laps, Jourdain spun in between the fifth and sixth turns while warming up his tires, sustaining slight damage to his nose. He made a stop to remove the damaged nose before coming in again to replace the front wing assembly. The first lap of the race was run under the caution flag because of a water leak in turn eight. Jim Swintal waved the green flag at 1:37 p.m. local time to begin the race. Entering turn one, Andretti collided with Fittipaldi and skidded off-track. Vasser experienced brake lock-up and spun at the same area before being clipped from behind by Bräck. Andretti was able to continue with assistance from track marshals, but Vasser and Bräck retired from the race. The crash prompted the second caution flag of the race.

Once the track was cleaned, da Matta led the field back up to speed for a single-file restart on the sixth lap, with Kanaan assuming the fifth position as a result of Andretti's spin. Da Matta pulled clear of Tracy by 2.166 seconds before the caution was issued for the third time because of Dixon, who spun in turn six after suffering a right-front suspension failure. Despite avoiding a nearby tire barrier, Dixon did not return to the race. After the restart on the 13th lap, da Matta recorded lap times that were half a second quicker than those of second-place Tracy. The gap between the two drivers had extended to 4.886 seconds when all of the top-eight racers (including da Matta and Tracy) made their mandatory pit stops on lap 32. A quick stop by Tracy allowed him to close within 1.8 seconds of da Matta's lead before the fourth caution was thrown on lap 35: Takagi attempted to overtake Andretti entering turn six, but lost traction when he ran over a curb and collided into Andretti, sending them both into a tire wall. Takagi sustained too much damage to continue, whereas Andretti stayed in the race to gain points. Da Matta and several other drivers pitted on the following lap in order to make one more stop before the race's end. Tracy assumed the lead, but he would be forced to pit twice more.

For the lap-39 restart, Tracy, da Matta, Franchitti, Carpentier, and Kanaan were in the top-five. Three laps later, Domínguez slightly contacted the tire wall in turn six, but continued without necessitating a caution. Servià lost the ninth position to Tagliani on lap 57 before his car sputtered with a gearbox failure the following lap, causing him to retire from the race on the 61st lap. Carpentier was passed for fourth place by Kanaan that same lap. On the 64th lap, Tracy – with a six-second advantage over da Matta – made his mandatory stop. The next lap, both Newman/Haas Racing drivers suddenly slowed with broken drive shafts. Although Fittipaldi made it to pit road before retiring, da Matta's car was parked in between the eighth and ninth turns. A local caution was thrown to push his car off-course. Franchitti resultantly took the lead with a 17-second gap over Kanaan before the two drivers made their final stops on lap 68, giving the lead back to Tracy the next lap. On the 70th lap, Junqueira's car slowed and Tracy collided into his right-rear tire in the sixth corner, causing damage to his left-front wing. They both continued without further incident.

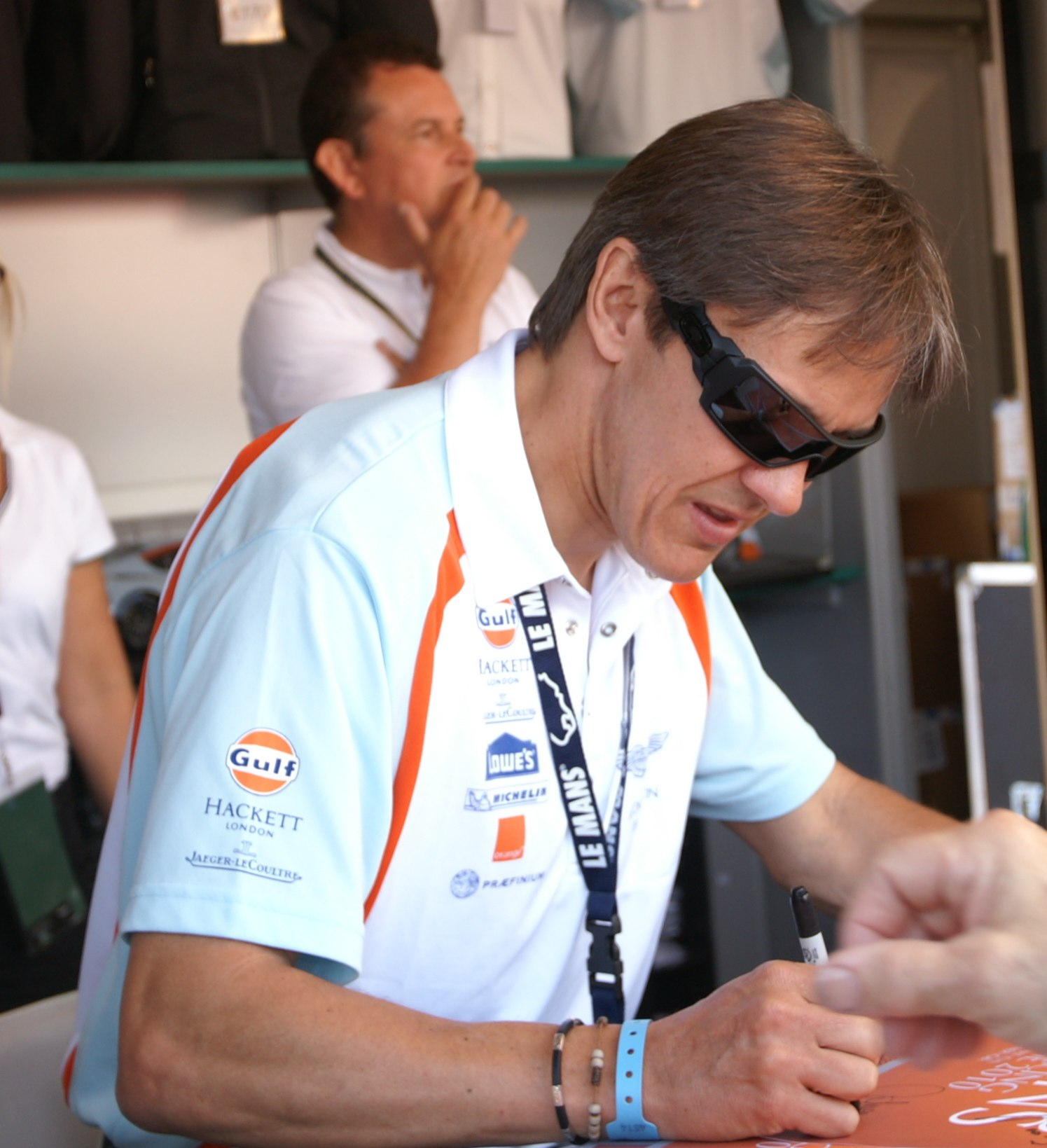
Adrián Fernández (pictured in 2010) suffered an injury in a high-speed collision with Bruno Junqueira.

Tracy's 17.2-second advantage was not enough to maintain his lead by the time he made his final stop on lap 85; he rejoined the race in the second position behind the new leader, Franchitti. On the 88th lap, Nakano spun into the tire wall in turn six and drove off without his rear wing, which remained on the circuit until the fifth caution was issued to retrieve it. Franchitti led Tracy, Kanaan, Carpentier, and Jourdain for the resumption of green-flag racing on lap 91. The declining air temperature caused the cars' tires to cool down more than ever, which led to Carpentier sliding sideways at the high-speed fifth turn. He managed to continue on without hitting anything. Jourdain got by Carpentier, but Tagliani spun in avoidance and blocked the track. As a result, Junqueira collided into Fernández and both cars came to rest against the wall. Tagliani attempted to drive his damaged car to pit road before his left-front suspension collapsed, which caused his tire to flop underneath his chassis and briefly launched his car into the air. His tire then bounced across the track, nearly hitting Domínguez in the process. The red flag was displayed for 16 minutes and 40 seconds as safety officials extracted Fernández from his car. He was transported to Vancouver General Hospital with a severely bruised right hip.

Under caution, Carpentier pulled into pit road to replace his flat-spotted tires. After a single warm-up lap, the racing continued on lap 95. Kanaan overtook Jourdain for the third position in the first turn. The cold tires and slippery track conditions prevented Tracy from gaining ground on his teammate Franchitti, who earned his first win of the season, his second at Vancouver, and the eighth of his career. He finished 1.239 seconds ahead of Tracy for a Team Green 1–2 finish. Kanaan came in third in what was his and Mo Nunn Racing's first podium result of the season. Jourdain finished fourth to earn points for the tenth consecutive race. Carpentier was the last driver to finish on the lead lap, in fifth. Andretti, six laps behind the leaders in sixth place, and Domínguez, ten laps down in tenth, were the only other classified finishers. There were five lead changes between three different drivers during the race. Tracy led two times for a total of 45 laps, more than any other driver.

=== Post-race ===
"I've been waiting two years to say this, but this one's for you, Greg."

— Dario Franchitti after the race.

During podium celebrations after the race, Franchitti thanked his team for assisting him in the race: "The Team KOOL Green guys did a great job on the pit stops today and I'm really happy. We knew late in the race that Paul (Tracy) would have to pit again and it's unfortunate for him, but our strategy worked wonderfully today. Kyle (Moyer, Team Green team manager) said Paul would be strong on the restart but I made sure I stayed in the lead and built a decent gap." He dedicated the win to the late Greg Moore, a CART driver from Vancouver who died in the 1999 Marlboro 500 and whose father Ric presented the winner's trophy: "It’s a small thing, but it means a lot for me to be able to win up here. I know if he was here, we’d be out partying tonight." He earned $100,000 for his win.

Second-place Tracy reminisced about Team Green's previous 1–2 finish at Vancouver in 2000, which he won and Franchitti was second, "I'm really happy for Dario (Franchitti). I remember the emotion of seeing Ric Moore (Greg's father) on the podium and I remember how disappointed Dario was because he wanted to win that race so badly for Greg." He considered the race to be a "great day" for his team because of the many championship points they amassed. After a series of poor results in the 2002 season, Kanaan believed that his third-place finish was "the beginning of something good." He also spoke of the emotional impact of a podium at Greg Moore's hometown: "(Moore) had to have something to do about arranging this podium because we were three of his best friends when he was alive."

On Monday morning, Fernández was released from Vancouver General Hospital after undergoing a precautionary ultrasound that was negative and a CT scan the evening prior. CART's chief orthopedic consultant Dr. Terry Trammell stated that Fernández suffered "a very severe bruise on his right buttock and an insignificant hairline fracture of the left pelvis." Fernández said of the lap-91 crash: "Obviously I am in a lot of pain in my hip and lower back. The impact of the crash penetrated the chassis. Having that Kevlar seat saved me. I was compressed inside the cockpit. It was hard to breathe and extremely painful." He traveled to Indianapolis to begin his rehabilitation process with Trammell, who announced on August 2 that he would not be able to travel to Lexington, Ohio for the series' next round, the Grand Prix of Mid-Ohio, because of his body soreness. Fernández yielded his seat to Max Papis before he returned in the Grand Prix at Road America.

The final race result meant that da Matta maintained his Drivers' Championship lead with 122 points. Franchitti, however, advanced to second place with 84 points, while Jourdain matched Junqueira's points total of 74 to tie for third place. Carpentier was demoted to fifth place on 72 points. As for the Manufacturers' Championship, Toyota continued leading with 171 points, but their advantage over Honda decreased to 16 points. Ford-Cosworth remained third with 126 points as nine races remained in the season.

=== Race classification ===
Drivers who scored championship points are denoted in bold.

Final race results
| Pos | No. | Driver | Team | Laps | Time/Retired | Grid | Points |
|---|---|---|---|---|---|---|---|
| 1 | **27** | (United Kingdom) **Dario Franchitti** | **Team Green** | 100 | 1:59:25.063 | 3 | **20** |
| 2 | **26** | (Canada) **Paul Tracy** | **Team Green** | 100 | +1.239 | 2 | **18**^{1}^{3} |
| 3 | **10** | (Brazil) **Tony Kanaan** | **Mo Nunn Racing** | 100 | +2.363 | 6 | **14** |
| 4 | **9** | (Mexico) **Michel Jourdain Jr.** | **Team Rahal** | 100 | +2.709 | 18 | **12** |
| 5 | **32** | (Canada) **Patrick Carpentier** | **Forsythe Racing** | 100 | +3.319 | 16 | **10** |
| 6 | **39** | (United States) **Michael Andretti** | **Team Motorola** | 94 | +6 Laps | 5 | **8** |
| 7 | **33** | (Canada) **Alex Tagliani** | **Forsythe Racing** | 91 | Contact | 8 | **6** |
| 8 | **51** | (Mexico) **Adrián Fernández** | **Fernández Racing** | 91 | Contact | 11 | **5** |
| 9 | **4** | (Brazil) **Bruno Junqueira** | **Chip Ganassi Racing** | 90 | Contact | 12 | **4** |
| 10 | **55** | (Mexico) **Mario Domínguez** | **Herdez Competition** | 90 | +10 Laps | 17 | **3** |
| 11 | **52** | (Japan) **Shinji Nakano** | **Fernández Racing** | 87 | Contact | 13 | **2** |
| 12 | **6** | (Brazil) **Cristiano da Matta** | **Newman/Haas Racing** | 64 | Gearbox | 1 | **2**^{2} |
| 13 | 11 | (Brazil) Christian Fittipaldi | Newman/Haas Racing | 64 | Gearbox | 7 | — |
| 14 | 20 | (Spain) Oriol Servià | Patrick Racing | 58 | Gearbox | 15 | — |
| 15 | 5 | (Japan) Toranosuke Takagi | Walker Racing | 34 | Contact | 14 | — |
| 16 | 44 | (New Zealand) Scott Dixon | Chip Ganassi Racing | 9 | Suspension | 4 | — |
| 17 | 8 | (United States) Jimmy Vasser | Team Rahal | 2 | Contact | 9 | — |
| 18 | 12 | (Sweden) Kenny Bräck | Chip Ganassi Racing | 2 | Contact | 10 | — |

Notes

- **^1** – Includes one bonus point for being the fastest qualifier on Friday.
- **^2** – Includes one bonus point for being the fastest qualifier on Saturday.
- **^3** – Includes one bonus point for leading the most laps.

== Championship standings after the race ==
Drivers' Championship standings
| +/– | Pos | Driver | Points |
|---|---|---|---|
| | 1 | (Brazil) Cristiano da Matta | 122 |
| 1 | 2 | (United Kingdom) Dario Franchitti | 84 (–38) |
| 1 | 3 | (Brazil) Bruno Junqueira | 74 (–48) |
| 1 | 4 | (Mexico) Michel Jourdain Jr. | 74 (–48) |
| 1 | 5 | (Canada) Patrick Carpentier | 72 (–50) |

Constructors' Championship standings
| +/– | Pos | Constructor | Points |
|---|---|---|---|
| | 1 | (United Kingdom) Lola | 209 |
| | 2 | (United Kingdom) Reynard | 125 (–84) |

Manufacturers' Championship standings
| +/– | Pos | Manufacturer | Points |
|---|---|---|---|
| | 1 | (Japan) Toyota | 171 |
| | 2 | (Japan) Honda | 155 (–16) |
| | 3 | (United Kingdom) Ford-Cosworth | 126 (–45) |

- Note: Only the top five positions are included for the drivers' standings.

| Previous race: 2002 Marconi Grand Prix of Cleveland | CART FedEx Championship Series; 2002 season | Next race: 2002 CART Grand Prix of Mid-Ohio |
| Previous race: 2001 Molson Indy Vancouver | 2002 Molson Indy Vancouver | Next race: 2003 Molson Indy Vancouver |
