= 2001 Molson Indy Vancouver =

Coordinates: 49°16′34″N 123°6′24″W

(Canada) 2001 Molson Indy Vancouver
Race details
- Race 15 of 21 in the 2001 CART season
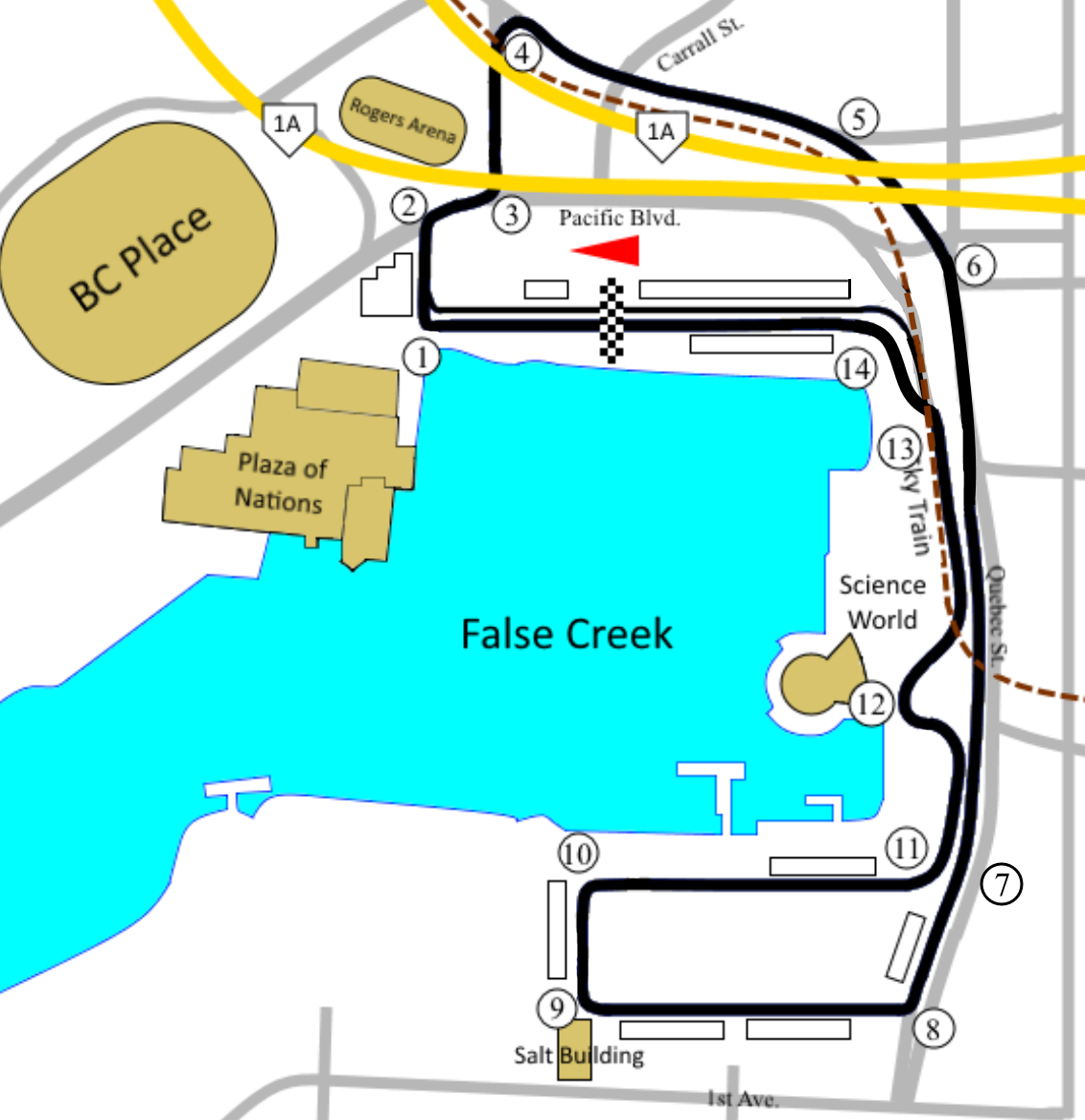
- Date: September 2, 2001
- Official name: 2001 Molson Indy Vancouver
- Location: Concord Pacific Place, Vancouver, British Columbia, Canada
- Course: Temporary Street Course; 1.780 mi / 2.865 km
- Distance: 98 (shortened from 100) laps 174.44 mi / 280.77 km
- Weather: Partly cloudy with low winds and ambient temperatures of 74°F (23°C); track temperature at race time was 85°F (29°C)

Pole position
- Driver: (Canada) (Canada) Alex Tagliani (Forsythe Racing)
- Time: 1:00.872

Fastest lap
- Driver: (Brazil) (Brazil) Hélio Castroneves (Team Penske)
- Time: 1:01.545 (on lap 64 of 98 (shortened from 100))

Podium
- First: (Brazil) (Brazil) Roberto Moreno (Patrick Racing)
- Second: (Brazil) (Brazil) Gil de Ferran (Team Penske)
- Third: (United States) (United States) Michael Andretti (Team Green)

The 2001 Molson Indy Vancouver was a Championship Auto Racing Teams (CART) motor race held on September 2, 2001 at Concord Pacific Place in Vancouver, British Columbia, Canada. It was the 15th round of the 2001 CART season. Roberto Moreno won the shortened race by five seconds over Gil de Ferran and Michael Andretti.

Moreno won his second and final CART race by passing multiple contenders throughout the race, also earning Patrick Racing its final victory in open-wheel racing in the process. de Ferran earned his fifth podium of 2001 and moved into first place in the points standings, but he still did not have a win for Team Penske at this point in the season. Andretti picked up his fourth podium of the year and his sixth overall at Vancouver.

The race was marked by multiple incidents and crashes that forced CART officials to call a timed race that ended the event after two hours and 98 of the scheduled 100 laps. Despite starting on pole and leading the most laps, Alex Tagliani was forced to retire from the lead after 68 laps when his Ford-Cosworth engine let go in dramatic fashion, once again thwarting his attempts to take his first victory in the series.

== Report ==
=== Background ===
Vancouver was the second Canadian stop for the CART teams after Toronto, and the series had seen massive swings in form from both drivers and teams. Rookie Bruno Junqueira, who had previously been scrapping for points in the midfield, scored his first win at the preceding race in Road America. After winning the race in Toronto, Michael Andretti had been plagued with multiple DNFs before finally finishing second at Road America and was looking to get his pursuit of the championship back on track. Defending series champion Gil de Ferran, after a lukewarm start to 2001, was beginning to power his way to the front of the point standings, coming to Vancouver on the heels of three consecutive top-5 finishes and a pole position at Mid-Ohio. His teammate, Helio Castroneves, was currently leading the standings by a slim margin over Kenny Bräck.

But the big story going into Vancouver was the rise of Forsythe Racing and the string of good results by Canadian drivers Patrick Carpentier and Alex Tagliani. After struggling for points at the beginning of the year, their luck began to change after Tagliani scored his first career podium in front of the home fans in Toronto, followed by Carpentier scoring his first win at the next race at Michigan. From then on, both drivers had scored solid points in every race before Vancouver, including two more podiums for Carpentier. Analysts expected both Forsythe Racing drivers to continue their momentum now that they were back on Canadian soil.

Also going into the weekend, CART announced a three-year extension for the Vancouver race, meaning that the 2002 season would see three Canadian races, after it was confirmed that Montreal would host the series at Circuit Gilles Villeneuve.

=== Practice and Qualifying ===
Practice would be a challenge for the teams and the drivers, as the weather forecasts called for light showers on Friday and again during qualifying on Saturday. For morning practice on Friday, however, the inclement weather stayed away long enough for the full session to be completed. Many driver experienced grip issues on the slick temporary street course, especially at the 90-degree right-handed Turn 1. Dario Franchitti stalled twice on track during the first session with fuel pressure issues while Max Wilson nudged into the Turn 12 barriers, causing moderate damage to the nose of the car. At the end of the session, Tony Kanaan had managed to top the time sheets with a 1:01.958 followed by Cristiano da Matta with a 1:01.968 and de Ferran with a 1:02.302. The top twelve cars were separated by less than one second.

Although clouds were building around Vancouver during the Friday afternoon practice, no rain fell on the track and thus the session continued as normal. The pace began to pick up as drivers started putting in more and more fast laps. The only major interruption of the day came when Junqueira hit the wall in Turn 10 and damaged the right suspension about twenty minutes into the session, bringing out the red flag. The quickest laps came right at the end, with Tagliani clocking a 1:01.230 on his final lap of the day, followed by Castroneves at 1:01.438 and Roberto Moreno at 1:01.506. Bräck, Franchitti, Wilson, Bryan Herta, and Alex Zanardi all moved to their backup cars during the session.

I'd like to race in Canada all the time. The media isn't easy, but I get more motivation and more support from the fans... I got lucky on my last lap and had no traffic so I was able to put in a perfect lap. But being fastest on one day doesn't mean you're going to win the weekend. We'll have to push harder tomorrow.

— Alex Tagliani, after finishing on top in Friday practice

The rain that was predicted for the weekend finally fell later that night and soaked the track, and the result going into qualifying day was a track with standing water from Turn 8 to Turn 12 and dry patches of asphalt everywhere else. Drivers approached the track with rain tires at the start of Saturday morning practice, but as the session went on drivers began to put on slicks as the track dried out. Castroneves set the fastest time of the weekend with a 1:00.742, the first driver to break out of the 1:01 second range. de Ferran followed up in second with a 1:01.235 and da Matta came in third with a 1:01.503.

When qualifying began later that day, the track had completely dried out as the field was split into two groups for the afternoon session. Junqueira topped Group 1 with a 1:01.194, followed by Max Papis with a 1:01.668 and Adrian Fernández with a 1:01.711.

Group 2 saw many drivers testing the track limits, or in some cases, exceeding them. da Matta, just two minutes after the beginning of the session, slid into the barriers at Turn 12, damaging his front wing and forcing him to use the backup car for the rest of the session. Ten minutes later, Moreno, who at the time was running third in the session and fourth overall, lost power on the backstretch and was forced to retire the car. Tagliani, meanwhile, had put his car on provisional pole with a 1:00.872. Little changed at the top of lap charts until minutes before the end of the session when Carpentier put in a blistering lap and qualified second overall with a 1:00.924. Immediately afterward, however, he slid into the barrier at Turn 6 and stalled the car. Compatriot Paul Tracy, just ahead of him, crashed into the barriers at Turn 7 and damaged the front suspension. CART officials threw the red-and-checkered flag, ending the session.

Qualifying had produced an all-Canadian front row, much to the delight of the Vancouver race fans and Forsythe Racing. This was Tagliani's second pole position in his CART career and his first on a street course; he was presented the Greg Moore Pole Trophy by Ric Moore, father of the hometown favorite who was tragically killed during the 1999 Marlboro 500 in Fontana. Coincidentally, this was the first all-Forsythe front row since Milwaukee in 1998, where Carpentier and Moore also went 1-2 in qualifying.

I'm really pleased and honored. I got pretty emotional when Mr. Moore presented the trophy. We're all racers and want to do well, but to do it here in Canada in front of all of our fans and friends makes it even more special. And to have both blue and white Player's cars on the front row is a great tribute to Greg.

— Alex Tagliani, after winning pole position

The top four cars were all separated by less than one-hundredth of a second. Nevertheless, de Ferran, who was starting 3rd with a 1:00.933, was less than enthusiastic with his qualifying performance:

It was a little bit frustrating session for us. I wasn't extremely happy with the car in the morning and we made some changes in the car and improved it a little bit, but it wasn't perfect. I had quite a lot of oversteer, and I had some good laps going only to mess it up in one of the last three corners. But it is what it is. That's what qualifying is all about. You need to have a complete lap, and the start/finish line isn't in Turn 9. I just couldn't get it together.

— Gil de Ferran

=== Race ===
Morning warmup saw threatening showers looming in the mountains outside of Vancouver, but for the time being the track was still dry. da Matta led the 30-minute session before the race began.

The green flag waved for the first time just after 2:00 PM as Tagliani led the field into Turn 1. Junqueira, trying to pull to the outside of the queue, clipped the front of Tracy and spun; he managed to keep it out of the tire barriers but ended up stalling the car. Meanwhile, side-to-side contact between Bräck and Castroneves meant that the latter was forced off-track at Turn 3, where he also stalled the car. Junqueira was able to get restarted relatively quickly, but the position of Castroneves' car meant that a full-course caution was needed to get him refired. Both cars would head into the pits for service and go a lap down.

During the opening caution, Alex Zanardi, Wilson, and Bryan Herta all went into the pits to top off on fuel, anticipating a strategy change later in the race.

The green waved again on Lap 5, where Moreno was able to get around Bräck and take 4th place after starting 7th. Tagliani was looking to extend the gap between him and 2nd place Carpentier as the stint continued and by Lap 15 he had pulled out a five-second gap between them. On Lap 24, Moreno was finally able to get around de Ferran for 3rd place. At the same time, points-leader Castroneves came to a stop on the start-finish straight with an electrical problem, forcing the second caution of the day.

This was the signal for all the cars to pit for fuel and tires, with Tagliani leading the way. The two Forsythe cars remained 1-2, while thanks to a quicker pit stop, de Ferran was able to edge out of the pits ahead of Moreno and retake the position. The only cars that did not pit were Scott Dixon, Memo Gidley, and Wilson; this slotted Dixon into 2nd and Gidley into 4th. Castroneves was able to get the car restarted, but he was now three laps down.

The field went back to green on Lap 30 with Tagliani again pulling away. Tracy, who was trying to tuck in behind Fernández going into Turn 6, was clipped from behind by da Matta, who lost part of his front wing. Suffering from a right rear puncture, Tracy pulled onto the runoff area at Turn 1 and retired the car, the official cause being a gearbox malfunction that resulted from the collision with da Matta. The race continued under green as Tracy's car was removed. From Papis in 9th on back, the field was running nose-to-tail. On Lap 34, Moreno once again passed de Ferran on track to take 4th place. From there he immediately pulled away and began hounding Carpentier for 2nd place. One lap later, Wilson was forced to pull off track at Turn 6 and retire from the race with a mechanical problem.

On Lap 41 both Dixon and Gidley finally made their pit stops, falling down the order. At the same time, leader Tagliani was beginning to lap the field, going around Herta. Dixon, who was battling for position at the back of the pack with fresher tires, collided with Tora Takagi at Turn 6, forcing him off the track and stalling the car. Almost simultaneously, Zanardi hit the tire barriers going into Turn 7, spilling water that had collected from the previous night's rain all over the track. The 3rd caution came out as a result of Zanardi's retirement, while Dixon was able to get restarted, albeit he was now a lap down. This was Zanardi's 7th DNF of the season, the most of any drivers in the series.

CART officials sent out the jet dryers to Turn 7 in order to dry the track during the caution; the cleanup took longer than expected as the water kept seeping back onto the track from the tire barrier.

Finally, on Lap 51, the green flag came back out with Tagliani leading. Takagi, one lap down, was positioned behind Tagliani on the restart, and over the next several laps he tried to get around Tagliani and get back on the lead lap. Unable to pass, the two cars raced ahead of the field while Bräck and Moreno kept pace with Carpentier.

Finally, on Lap 69, Papis and Andretti pulled into the pits for their scheduled stops, both falling back down the order. Meanwhile, the race took a dramatic turn as Tagliani, who had reported a strange noise to his crew just laps earlier, was helpless as a large plume of smoke erupted from the back of his car, forcing him to pull off-course and retire from first place.

Since Tagliani had managed to avoid bringing out a caution, his teammate Carpentier and 3rd place Bräck pulled into the pits for their scheduled stops, handing the lead to Moreno. Moreno then gave up the lead to Cristiano da Matta one lap later when he made his pit stop.

The drama continued when Papis clouted the wall in Turn 4, destroying the right-side suspension, putting him out of the race and bringing out the full-course caution. The yellow gave the rest of the field a perfect opportunity to pit as da Matta, Franchitti, and Jimmy Vasser each made a stop for fuel and tires. This handed the lead to Michel Jourdain Jr. and Oriol Servià, who had only made one pit stop so far. Both cars would pit a few laps later, now giving the lead to Maurício Gugelmin. While the order continued to shuffle under yellow, CART officials penalized da Matta, Franchitti, and Vasser for pitting when the pits were closed by forcing all three drivers to the back of the queue.

On Lap 80, the green came back out with Gugelmin leading and Moreno and de Ferran behind. At Turn 1, de Ferran braked hard on the inside and forced Moreno wide to take 2nd place away. 4th place Bräck misjudged his braking point and went wide at the same corner, dropping him back several positions. Just behind him, Fernández slid into the tire barriers and stalled the car, ending his day. The race continued under green as de Ferran stormed past Gugelmin on the back straight to take 1st place. At Turn 6, da Matta tangled with Takagi, sending the former into the tire barriers and forcing him to retire as well. Officials finally waved the full-course yellow in order to get both da Matta and Fernández off the track.

The yellow meant that every car except Castroneves and Herta was now back on the lead lap and could go the rest of the race without pitting, setting up a field-wide battle for position near the end of the race. The green waved on Lap 85 with de Ferran leading, but more trouble ensued when Bräck ran into the back of Carpentier, sending both cars off track and giving Carpentier a flat right rear tire. Bräck fell from 5th to 8th place as a result of the incident, while Carpentier was forced to limp around the circuit back to pits to change tires; he would be put a lap down.

Just a few corners later, Vasser ran off-track after punting the back of Christian Fittipaldi, who had locked up going into the corner. He severely damaged his front wing and was forced to retire from the race. At the same time, Gugelmin was struggling to keep pace with the leaders and began to fall back; going through Turn 6 he was passed by Andretti and Kanaan when he clipped the front wing of Servià, who was also trying to pass.

Despite the carnage and bits of debris on track, CART officials kept the race under green. On Lap 87 they announced that the race would be timed and would not go the full 100 laps.

On Lap 89 Moreno passed de Ferran to take the lead with less than ten minutes remaining in the race. From then on, he pulled away, leaving the rest of the field behind. The rest of the race was incident-free, and Moreno remained unchallenged as he took the checkered flag for his second career win.

=== Post-Race ===
Moreno was emotional as he circled around for his victory lap, performing donuts on the start-finish straight and celebrating on victory lane with his team and the Brazilian flag draped around his shoulders. He was holding back tears as he raised the winner's and gave interviews.

For Moreno, this would be his second and final CART victory, as well as the last for Patrick Racing before it folded in 2004. Despite the good result, Moreno would have horrendous luck for the rest of the season, scoring only two points at Surfer's Paradise for pole position and leading the most laps; he would ultimately DNF at five of the last six races of the season and was dropped from the team for 2002. Moreno would come back to CART in 2003 racing for Herdez Competition and score one final career podium at Miami. Moreno was also the sixth different winner at Vancouver in as many years and he gave Toyota its first win of the season on a street course.

This morning when we went out for warmup, we knew straight away that we had a good car. We found something this morning that was important, and that was that the car was better on new tires, so we went out and did just one lap on the new tires to get the shine off. And then the weather cooperated too. I told my engineer not to do too much to the car because it was good ... With about five laps to go I started crying in the car, and I started thinking about Greg [Moore]. I would like to dedicate this race for Greg. We all wish he was still here, and we think about him all the time when we're up here, so I'd like to dedicate this race for him.

— Roberto Moreno, after winning the race

de Ferran recorded his fifth podium of the year, continuing an upward trend that would ultimately earn him two wins and the season championship. His 2nd place also vaulted him into 1st place in the drivers' standings ahead of his teammate Castroneves, becoming the third different points leader in as many races.

Andretti was pleased with his podium finish, as he continued his streak of strong points finishes in Canada and earned his sixth podium in Vancouver. He would go on to score another podium in Surfer's Paradise by the end of the season.

This would be Alex Zanardi's final race before his career-ending crash at the 2001 American Memorial in Germany two weeks later.

== Qualifying ==
September 1, 2001 - Qualifying Speeds
Rank	Driver	Time	Leader	Speed (mph)	Team
1	(Canada) Alex Tagliani	1:00.872	–	105.329	Forsythe Racing
2	(Canada) Patrick Carpentier	1:00.924	+0.052	105.239	Forsythe Racing
3	(Brazil) Gil de Ferran	1:00.933	+0.061	105.224	Team Penske
4	(Sweden) Kenny Bräck	1:00.943	+0.071	105.207	Team Rahal
5	(Brazil) Hélio Castroneves	1:00.966	+0.126	105.112	Team Penske
6	(Brazil) Bruno Junqueira (R)	1:01.194	+0.322	104.775	Chip Ganassi Racing
7	(Brazil) Roberto Moreno	1:01.260	+0.388	104.662	Patrick Racing
8	(Canada) Paul Tracy	1:01.486	+0.616	104.274	Team Green
9	(Italy) Max Papis	1:01.668	+0.796	103.970	Team Rahal
10	(Mexico) Adrian Fernández	1:01.711	+0.811	103.897	Fernandez Racing
11	(United States) Michael Andretti	1:01.716	+0.844	103.889	Team Motorola
12	(Brazil) Christian Fittipaldi	1:01.717	+0.845	103.887	Newman-Haas Racing
13	(Brazil) Tony Kanaan	1:01.760	+0.888	103.815	Mo Nunn Racing
14	(Brazil) Cristiano da Matta	1:01.783	+0.911	103.776	Newman-Haas Racing
15	(United States) Jimmy Vasser	1:01.822	+0.950	103.711	Patrick Racing
16	(Brazil) Maurício Gugelmin	1:01.879	+1.007	103.615	PacWest Racing
17	(New Zealand) Scott Dixon (R)	1:02.007	+1.135	103.401	PacWest Racing
18	(Japan) Tora Takagi (R)	1:02.023	+1.151	103.375	Walker Motorsport
19	(Scotland) Dario Franchitti	1:02.074	+1.202	103.290	Team Green
20	(United States) Memo Gidley	1:02.207	+1.335	103.069	Chip Ganassi Racing
21	(Mexico) Michel Jourdain Jr.	1:02.332	+1.460	102.862	Bettenhausen Racing
22	(Spain) Oriol Servià	1:02.472	+1.600	102.632	Sigma Autosport
23	(Italy) Alex Zanardi	1:02.519	+1.647	102.554	Mo Nunn Racing
24	(Japan) Shinji Nakano	1:02.583	+1.711	102.450	Fernandez Racing
25	(Brazil) Max Wilson (R)	1:02.835	+1.963	102.039	Arciero Racing
26	(United States) Bryan Herta	1:03.225	+2.353	101.409	Forsythe Racing

== Race ==
Pos	No	Driver	Team	Laps	Time/retired	Grid	Points
1	20	(Brazil) Roberto Moreno	Patrick Racing	98	2:10:01.276	7	20
2	1	(Brazil) Gil de Ferran	Team Penske	98	+4.687 secs	3	16
3	39	(United States) Michael Andretti	Team Motorola	98	+6.971	11	14
4	55	(Brazil) Tony Kanaan	Mo Nunn Racing	98	+10.499	13	12
5	22	(Spain) Oriol Servià	Sigma Autosport	98	+13.497	22	10
6	16	(Mexico) Michel Jourdain Jr.	Bettenhausen Racing	98	+13.850	21	8
7	5	(Japan) Tora Takagi (R)	Walker Motorsport	98	+14.520	18	6
8	8	(Sweden) Kenny Bräck	Team Rahal	98	+14.812	4	5
9	27	(Scotland) Dario Franchitti	Team Green	98	+15.122	19	4
10	12	(United States) Memo Gidley	Chip Ganassi Racing	98	+16.224	20	3
11	11	(Brazil) Christian Fittipaldi	Newman-Haas Racing	98	+16.536	12	2
12	4	(Brazil) Bruno Junqueira (R)	Chip Ganassi Racing	98	+21.186	6	1
13	18	(New Zealand) Scott Dixon (R)	PacWest Racing	98	+22.030	17	—
14	52	(Japan) Shinji Nakano	Fernandez Racing	98	+22.394	24	—
15	17	(Brazil) Maurício Gugelmin	PacWest Racing	97	+1 Lap	16	—
16	32	(Canada) Patrick Carpentier	Forsythe Racing	97	+1 Lap	2	—
17	77	(United States) Bryan Herta	Forsythe Racing	97	+1 Lap	26	—
18	3	(Brazil) Hélio Castroneves	Team Penske	95	+3 Laps	5	—
19	40	(United States) Jimmy Vasser	Patrick Racing	85	Contact	15	—
20	6	(Brazil) Cristiano da Matta	Newman-Haas Racing	81	Contact	14	—
21	51	(Mexico) Adrian Fernández	Fernandez Racing	79	Contact	10	—
22	7	(Italy) Max Papis	Team Rahal	69	Contact	9	—
23	33	(Canada) Alex Tagliani	Forsythe Racing	68	Gearbox	1	2^{1}
24	66	(Italy) Alex Zanardi	Mo Nunn Racing	40	Contact	23	—
25	25	(Brazil) Max Wilson (R)	Arciero Racing	35	Ignition	25	—
26	26	(Canada) Paul Tracy	Team Green	29	Contact	8	—

- ^{1}– Includes two bonus points for leading the most laps and being the fastest qualifier.

== Race statistics ==
- Lead changes: 6 among 6 drivers

Lap Leaders
Laps	Leader
1–68	Alex Tagliani
69	Roberto Moreno
70-72	Cristiano da Matta
73	Michel Jourdain Jr.
74-79	Maurício Gugelmin
80-89	Gil de Ferran
90-98	Roberto Moreno

Total laps led
Leader	Laps
Alex Tagliani	68
Roberto Moreno	10
Gil de Ferran	10
Maurício Gugelmin	6
Cristiano da Matta	3
Michael Jourdain Jr.	1

Cautions: 5 for 31 laps
Laps	Reason
1-4	Multiple incidents; Junqueira and Castroneves stall
25-29	Helio Castroneves stalls before the start/finish line
41-51	Alex Zanardi hits the barriers in Turn 7
70-79	Max Papis crashes in Turn 4
80-85	Adrian Fernández hits the barriers in Turn 1

== Standings after the race ==
Drivers' standings

Pos	+/-	Driver	Points
1	2	(Brazil) Gil de Ferran	115
2	1	(Brazil) Hélio Castroneves	110
3	1	(Sweden) Kenny Bräck	109
4		(United States) Michael Andretti	103
5	1	(Scotland) Dario Franchitti	85

Constructors' standings

Pos	+/–	Constructor	Points
1		(United Kingdom) Reynard	272
2		(United Kingdom) Lola	223

Manufacturer's Standings

Pos	+/-	Manufacturer	Points
1		(Japan) Honda	245
2		(Japan) Toyota	214
3		(United Kingdom) Ford Cosworth	203

Previous race: 2001 Motorola 220	CART FedEx Championship Series; 2001 season	Next race: 2001 American Memorial
Previous race: 2000 Molson Indy Vancouver	Molson Indy Vancouver	Next race: 2002 Molson Indy Vancouver
