= 2000 Molson Indy Vancouver =

Coordinates: 49°16′34″N 123°6′24″W

(Canada) 2000 Molson Indy Vancouver
Race details
- Race 15 of 20 in the 2000 CART season
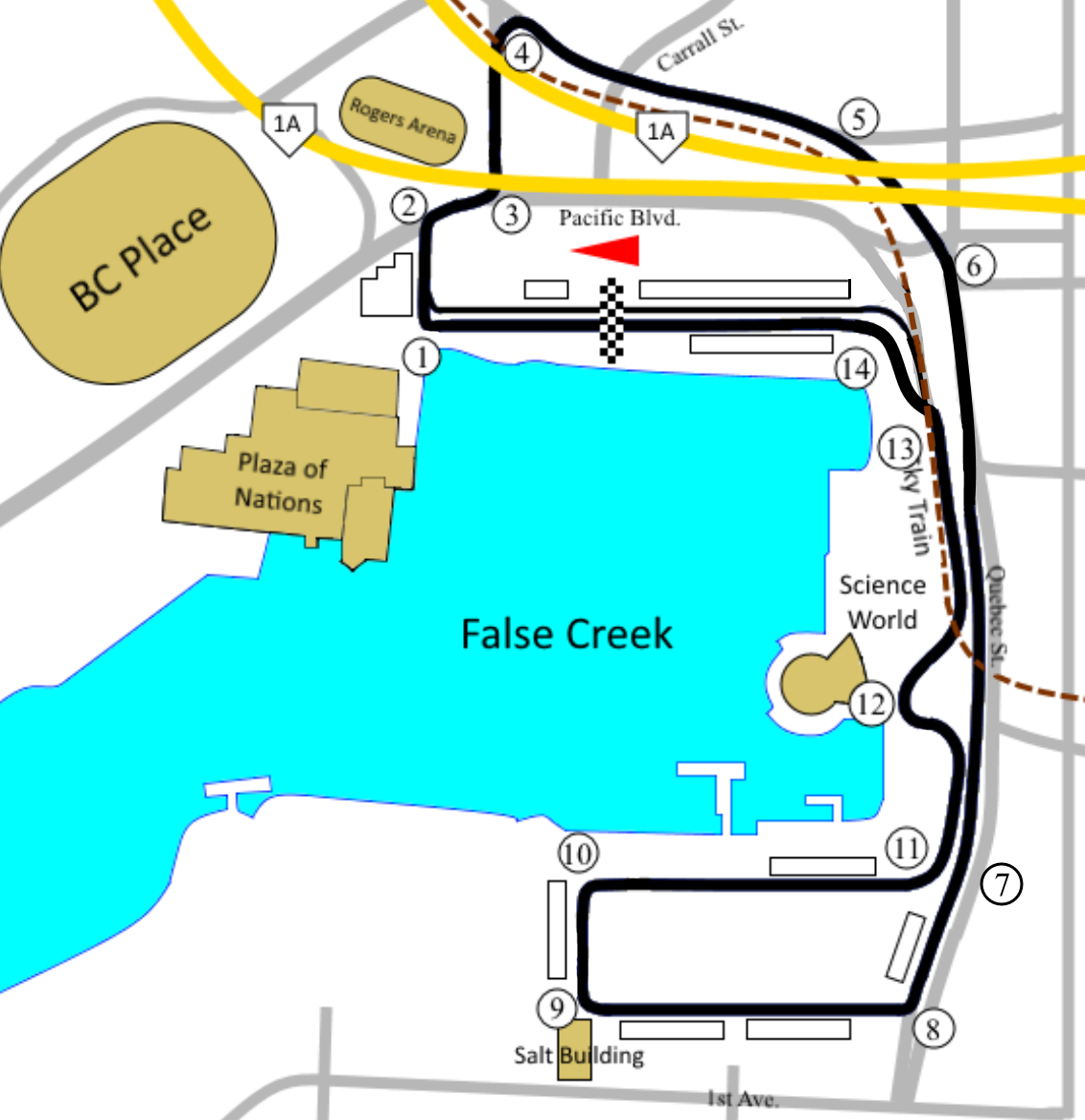
- Date: September 3, 2000
- Official name: 2000 Molson Indy Vancouver
- Location: Concord Pacific Place, Vancouver, British Columbia, Canada
- Course: Temporary Street Course; 1.780 mi / 2.865 km
- Distance: 90 laps 160.20 mi / 257.85 km
- Weather: Temperatures reaching up to 19.2 °C (66.6 °F)

Pole position
- Driver: (Scotland) (Scotland) Dario Franchitti (Team Green)
- Time: 106.144 mph

Fastest lap
- Driver: (Colombia) (Colombia) Juan Pablo Montoya (Chip Ganassi Racing)
- Time: 104.189 (on lap of 90)

Podium
- First: (Canada) (Canada) Paul Tracy (Team Green)
- Second: (Scotland) (Scotland) Dario Franchitti (Team Green)
- Third: (Mexico) (Mexico) Adrian Fernández (Patrick Racing)

The 2000 Molson Indy Vancouver was a Championship Auto Racing Teams (CART) motor race held on September 3, 2000 at Concord Pacific Place in Vancouver, British Columbia, Canada. It was the 15th round of the 2000 CART season. Paul Tracy won the race by less than half a second over his teammate Dario Franchitti with Adrian Fernández taking third place.

The race was an emotional affair, as it was former CART driver Greg Moore's home event and the first since his death at the 1999 Marlboro 500. His number, #99, was retired before the start of the race while Canadian sports legend Wayne Gretzky (who also sported #99 during his NHL career) gave the command to start engines.

Franchitti was handily leading the race until he stalled the car during a pitstop under caution, allowing Tracy to streak by in the pitlane and into first place. While the race did not see a lot of on-track passing, multiple cars were taken out as a result of crashes and on-track incidents. A total of 63,677 fans attended the event.

== Qualifying ==
September 2, 2000 - Qualifying Speeds
Rank	Driver	Speed (mph)	Team
1	(Scotland) Dario Franchitti	106.144	Team Green
2	(Canada) Paul Tracy	105.989	Team Green
3	(Brazil) Gil de Ferran	105.470	Team Penske
4	(Brazil) Hélio Castroneves	104.753	Team Penske
5	(Colombia) Juan Pablo Montoya	104.669	Chip Ganassi Racing
6	(Brazil) Christian Fittipaldi	104.425	Newman-Haas Racing
7	(Brazil) Cristiano da Matta	104.235	PPI Motorsports
8	(United States) Michael Andretti	104.220	Newman-Haas Racing
9	(Italy) Max Papis	104.075	Team Rahal
10	(Brazil) Roberto Moreno	104.037	Patrick Racing
11	(United States) Jimmy Vasser	103.943	Chip Ganassi Racing
12	(Spain) Oriol Servià (R)	103.800	PPI Motorsports
13	(Brazil) Maurício Gugelmin	103.771	PacWest Racing
14	(Brazil) Tony Kanaan	103.516	Mo Nunn Racing
15	(Mexico) Adrian Fernández	103.480	Patrick Racing
16	(Sweden) Kenny Bräck (R)	103.436	Team Rahal
17	(Mexico) Michel Jourdain Jr.	103.306	Bettenhausen Racing
18	(Canada) Patrick Carpentier	102.699	Forsythe Racing
19	(Canada) Alex Tagliani (R)	102.209	Forsythe Racing
20	(United Kingdom) Mark Blundell	102.136	PacWest Racing
21	(United States) Memo Gidley	101.289	Della Penna Motorsports
22	(Japan) Shinji Nakano (R)	100.846	Walker Racing
23	(Brazil) Tarso Marques	100.521	Dale Coyne Racing
24	(United States) Alex Barron	100.245	Dale Coyne Racing
25	(Brazil) Luiz Garcia Jr.	100.072	Arciero Racing

== Race ==
Pos	No	Driver	Team	Laps	Time/retired	Grid	Points
1	26	(Canada) Paul Tracy	Team Green	90	1:53:06.024	2	20
2	27	(Scotland) Dario Franchitti	Team Green	90	+0.384	1	18^{1}
3	40	(Mexico) Adrian Fernández	Patrick Racing	90	+19.031	15	14
4	11	(Brazil) Christian Fittipaldi	Newman-Haas Racing	90	+19.614	6	12
5	2	(Brazil) Gil de Ferran	Team Penske	90	+20.113	3	10
6	12	(United States) Jimmy Vasser	Chip Ganassi Racing	90	+20.559	11	8
7	97	(Brazil) Cristiano da Matta	PPI Motorsports	90	+31.924	7	6
8	7	(Italy) Max Papis	Team Rahal	90	+45.442	9	5
9	8	(Sweden) Kenny Bräck (R)	Team Rahal	90	+45.832	16	4
10	20	(Brazil) Roberto Moreno	Patrick Racing	89	+1 Lap	10	3
11	96	(Spain) Oriol Servià (R)	PPI Motorsports	89	+1 Lap	12	2
12	6	(United States) Michael Andretti	Newman-Haas Racing	88	Out of fuel	8	1
13	19	(United States) Alex Barron	Dale Coyne Racing	87	+3 Laps	24	—
14	55	(Brazil) Tony Kanaan	Mo Nunn Racing	85	+5 Laps	14	—
15	25	(Brazil) Luiz Garcia Jr.	Arciero Racing	84	+6 Laps	25	—
16	10	(United States) Memo Gidley	Della Penna Motorsports	77	Transmission	21	—
17	1	(Colombia) Juan Pablo Montoya	Chip Ganassi Racing	67	Fuel Pickup	5	—
18	33	(Canada) Alex Tagliani (R)	Forsythe Racing	63	Suspension	19	—
19	5	(Japan) Shinji Nakano (R)	Walker Racing	49	Contact	22	—
20	3	(Brazil) Hélio Castroneves	Team Penske	43	Contact	4	—
21	17	(Brazil) Maurício Gugelmin	PacWest Racing	14	Contact	13	—
22	34	(Brazil) Tarso Marques	Dale Coyne Racing	14	Contact	23	—
23	16	(Mexico) Michel Jourdain Jr.	Bettenhausen Racing	14	Contact	17	—
24	32	(Canada) Patrick Carpentier	Forsythe Racing	3	Contact	18	—
25	18	(United Kingdom) Mark Blundell	PacWest Racing	3	Contact	20	—

- ^{1}– Includes two bonus points for leading the most laps and being the fastest qualifier.

== Race statistics ==
- Lead changes: 3 among 3 drivers

Lap Leaders
Laps	Leader
1–40	Dario Franchitti
41-42	Gil de Ferran
43-52	Dario Franchitti
53-90	Paul Tracy

Total laps led
Leader	Laps
Dario Franchitti	50
Paul Tracy	38
Gil de Ferran	2

== Standings after the race ==
Drivers' standings

Pos	+/-	Driver	Points
1		(United States) Michael Andretti	126
2	4	(Canada) Paul Tracy	120
3	1	(Mexico) Adrian Fernández	117
4	1	(Brazil) Gil de Ferran	116
5	3	(Brazil) Roberto Moreno	115

Previous race: 2000 Motorola 220	CART FedEx Championship Series; 2000 season	Next race: 2000 Honda Grand Prix of Monterey
Previous race: 1999 Molson Indy Vancouver	Molson Indy Vancouver	Next race: 2001 Molson Indy Vancouver
