= 2001 Motorola 220 =

Coordinates: 43°47′51″N 87°59′38″W

(United States) 2001 Road America
Race details
- Race 14 of 21 in the 2001 CART season
- Date: August 19, 2001
- Official name: Motorola 220
- Location: Road America, Elkhart Lake, Wisconsin
- Course: Permanent racing facility 4.048 mi / 6.515 km
- Distance: 45 laps 182.160 mi / 293.158 km

Pole position
- Driver: (Sweden) Kenny Bräck (Team Rahal)
- Time: 2:03.531

Fastest lap
- Driver: (Brazil) Bruno Junqueira (Chip Ganassi Racing)
- Time: 1:43.606 (on lap 40 of 45)

Podium
- First: (Brazil) Bruno Junqueira (Chip Ganassi Racing)
- Second: (United States) Michael Andretti (Team Motorola)
- Third: (Mexico) Adrián Fernández (Fernández Racing)

The 2001 Motorola 220 was a Championship Auto Racing Teams (CART) motor race held on August 19, 2001, at the Road America circuit in Elkhart Lake, Wisconsin. It was the 14th race of the 2001 CART season, and the 19th annual edition of the event. Chip Ganassi Racing's Bruno Junqueira who started from tenth position won the 45-lap race. Michael Andretti finished second for Team Green and Fernández Racing driver Adrián Fernández was third.

Kenny Bräck took pole position by posting the fastest lap in qualifying, and held the lead until the race was stopped because of a flooded track on the backstraight. After a 47-minute delay to address the problem, the race restarted with Hélio Castroneves leading after a switch onto slick tires at his first pit stop before it was stopped. Castroneves led a race-high 24 laps until his final pit stop for fuel to reach the end of the race. Christian Fittipaldi assumed the lead, keeping it until he and Michael Andretti made contact, allowing Junqueira into first. Junqueira maintained the lead for the rest of the race to achieve his first CART victory. There were six cautions and two lead changes among three different drivers.

The result of the race left Castroneves as the new Drivers' Championship leader; Bräck fell to the second position with five points separating him and Castroneves. Gil de Ferran maintained the third position, Andretti's second-place result advanced him from fifth to fourth, and Scott Dixon took fifth from Dario Franchitti. Honda increased their advantage over Toyota in the Manufacturers' Championship to 35 points while Ford Cosworth dropped to third. Lola lowered Reynard's advantage at the top of the Constructors' Championship to 37 points with seven races left in the season.

== Background ==
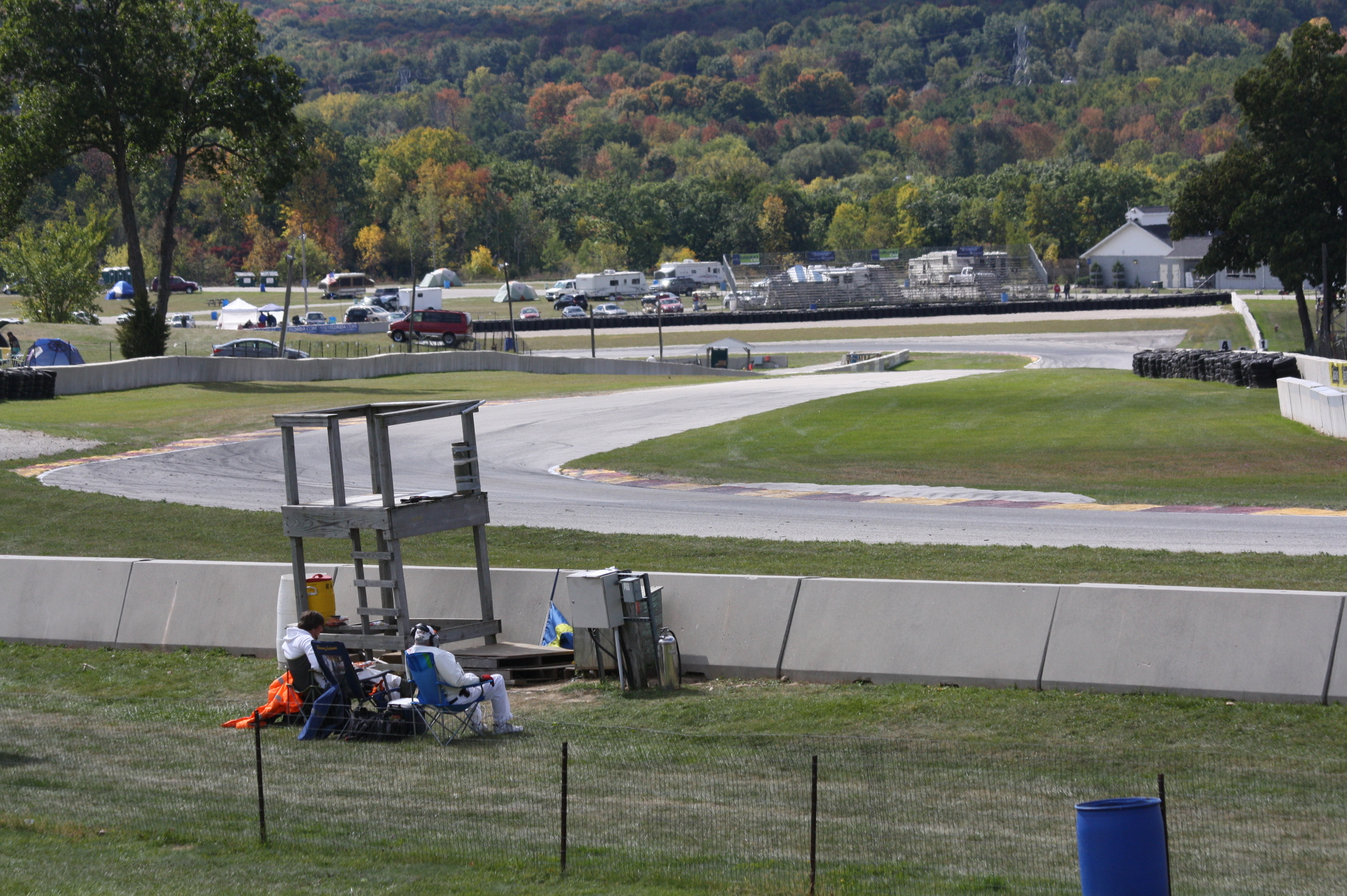
Road America, where the race was held

The Motorola 220 was confirmed as part of the Championship Auto Racing Teams (CART) 2001 schedule for the series in August 2000. It was to be the 19th consecutive year the race was held in the series, and the sixth and final event to be held in the Midwestern United States. The Motorola 220 was the 14th race of 21 scheduled by CART for 2001. It took place at the 14-turn 4.048 mi (6.515 km) Road America permanent road circuit in Elkhart Lake, Wisconsin, on August 19 and was set to run for 55 laps. The Barber Dodge Pro Series, Trans-Am Series, and Toyota Atlantic Championship held support races during the weekend.

Prior to the event, Kenny Bräck for Team Rahal on 104 points led the Drivers' Championship by one point over Team Penske driver Hélio Castroneves. Gil de Ferran was third on 89 points, eight ahead of fourth-placed Dario Franchitti, who in turn was a further eight points in front of Michael Andretti in fifth. Honda led the Manufacturers' Championship with 212 points; Ford Cosworth was second on 185, with Toyota 11 points behind in third. Reynard led the Constructors' Championship by 41 points over Lola. Paul Tracy was the race's defending champion from the 2000 event.

Andretti, who won at Road America three times, said he was feeling additional positive pressure heading into the race. He and his team wanted to go to the track and please his team's primary sponsor. Castroneves won the previous race of the season (at Mid-Ohio Sports Car Course) and stated he needed to maintain his recent momentum and increase his points tally. He spoke of his hope that he would be able to improve his result from the previous event at Road America in 2000. Bräck said his team had to improve his car, which he hoped would be fast on the straightaways since its engine produced a large amount of horsepower. He said that everything that had occurred during the season was in the past, and he had to focus on the race and attempt to win it.

== Practice and qualifying ==
There were two 75-minute practice sessions preceding Sunday's race. A test session, scheduled for Friday afternoon, ran for 90 minutes. Conditions were warm and sunny for both Friday practice sessions. Two red flags were shown in the first practice session. The first was for Roberto Moreno who stalled his engine in the eighth turn while on an out lap. The second was for Scott Dixon who spun into the turn five gravel trap and stalled his car, necessitating its removal from the circuit. Tora Takagi was fastest with a time of 1:42:202; Jimmy Vasser, de Ferran, Bräck, Franchitti, Bruno Junqueira, Moreno, Andretti, Bryan Herta and Castroneves rounded out the session's top ten drivers. De Ferran recorded the fastest lap of the day in the second practice session with a time of 1:41.055, ahead of Vasser, Franchitti. Andretti; Moreno, Cristiano da Matta, Junqueira, Tony Kanaan, Castroneves and Bräck.

A further five stoppages occurred; Max Papis spun into the turn 12 tire barrier, sustaining rear wing damage. Max Wilson simultaneously went off the track leaving the second turn and stalled. Herta slid into the turn three gravel trap, and Wilson stalled after exiting turn three. Vasser went off into the turn four gravel trap. Weather conditions became cloudy for the Saturday practice session due to a low pressure area developing to the west of the track. The session was stopped twice when Alex Tagliani spun into the turn six gravel trap and stalled his car, and Bräck's engine failed heading into the 12th turn and steered right towards the pit lane entry but stalled. De Ferran was fastest with a time of 1:40.511; Moreno, Vasser, Junqueira, Takagi, Castroneves, Adrián Fernández, Franchitti, Herta and Bräck completed the top ten. After the session ended, Alex Zanardi stopped his car in Fernández's pit stall to prevent him from entering it because Fernández blocked him in while on a timed lap. Zanardi then nudged Fernández in an accusatory manner before others stepped in to defuse the situation.

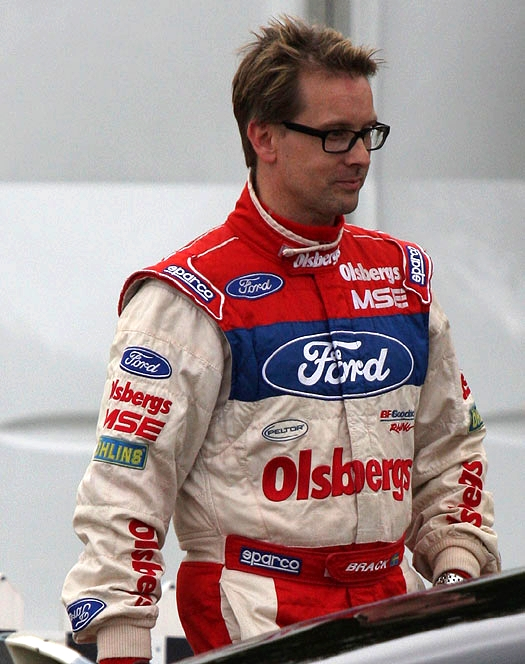
Kenny Bräck (pictured in 2012) had his fifth pole position of the season.

Saturday afternoon's 75-minute qualifying session saw cars divided into two groups with the leading championship point-standing leaders and the fastest two drivers from the previous road course race composing the second group. Both groups were allowed 30 minutes on the circuit with a 15-minute interval in between the two groups recording their lap times. A heavy rain shower, which ended one hour before qualifying began, made the track surface slippery and all cars were required to use wet-weather tires. Rain returned as the second group of cars drove onto the track. Several drivers slid off the track, but most avoided damaging their cars. Bräck achieved his fifth pole position of the season with a time of 2:03.531 and took one point for scoring the pole. He was joined on the grid's front row by Tagliani in his best qualifying performance on a road course in 2001. Tagliani could not claim the pole position as he slowed for Castroneves at Canada Corner during his final two timed laps. In his first time competing at Road America, Dixon qualified in third place on his final timed lap.

De Ferran spun twice and entered the pit lane to make changes to his car to allow him to go faster; he took fourth, ahead of da Matta. Castroneves elected to drive his team's backup car, which was optimized for wet-weather. He took sixth due to the effects the drying track had on his strategy. Andretti qualified in seventh place, pushing Memo Gidley to eighth position. Fittipaldi took ninth, and Junqueira tenth having two wheels into the gravel on the side of the track on his final lap. Vasser started 11th, nearly one-tenth of a second faster than Patrick Carpentier in 12th, and Takagi in 13th. Moreno and Maurício Gugelmin, Herta (who was delayed by Zanardi) and Kanaan, Oriol Servià, Wilson and Michel Jourdain Jr. filled the next six positions. Shinji Nakano, Papis, Zanardi and Tracy qualified in positions 21 to 24. Tracy caused the session to be stopped for four minutes when he spun into the turn four infield grass section. His session ended prematurely because he subsequently reported by radio a transmission failure to his team. Franchitti spun into the turn 12 gravel trap and was unable to go faster; he started 25th. Fernández did not set a lap time after he had spun at the third turn and hit the outside wall with his rear wing.

=== Qualifying classification ===
Final qualifying classification
Pos	No.	Driver	Team	Time	Speed	Gap
1	8	Kenny Bräck (SWE)	Team Rahal	2:03.531	117.969	—
2	33	Alex Tagliani (CAN)	Forsythe Racing	2:03.674	117.832	+0.143
3	18	Scott Dixon (NZL)	PacWest Racing	2:04.631	116.928	+1.100
4	1	Gil de Ferran (BRA)	Team Penske	2:04.909	116.667	+1.378
5	6	Cristiano da Matta (BRA)	Newman/Haas Racing	2:06.001	115.656	+2.470
6	3	Hélio Castroneves (BRA)	Team Penske	2:06.042	115.619	+2.511
7	39	Michael Andretti (USA)	Team Motorola	2:06.572	115.134	+3.041
8	12	Memo Gidley (USA)	Chip Ganassi Racing	2:06.865	114.869	+3.334
9	11	Christian Fittipaldi (BRA)	Newman/Haas Racing	2:07.085	114.671	+3.553
10	4	Bruno Junqueira (BRA)	Chip Ganassi Racing	2:07.422	114.366	+3.891
11	40	Jimmy Vasser (USA)	Patrick Racing	2:07.597	114.210	+4.066
12	32	Patrick Carpentier (CAN)	Forsythe Racing	2:07.664	114.150	+4.133
13	5	Toranosuke Takagi (JPN)	Walker Racing	2:07.792	114.035	+4.261
14	20	Roberto Moreno (BRA)	Patrick Racing	2:08.811	113.133	+5.280
15	17	Maurício Gugelmin (BRA)	PacWest Racing	2:09.015	112.954	+5.484
16	77	Bryan Herta (USA)	Forsythe Racing	2:09.073	112.904	+5.542
17	55	Tony Kanaan (BRA)	Mo Nunn Racing	2:09.330	112.679	+5.799
18	22	Oriol Servià (ESP)	Sigma Autosport	2:09.453	112.572	+5.922
19	25	Max Wilson (BRA)	Arciero-Blair Racing	2:11.014	111.231	+7.483
20	16	Michel Jourdain Jr. (MEX)	Bettenhausen Racing	2:11.061	111.191	+7.530
21	52	Shinji Nakano (JPN)	Fernández Racing	2:11.735	110.622	+8.204
22	7	Max Papis (ITA)	Team Rahal	2:11.801	110.561	+8.277
23	66	Alex Zanardi (ITA)	Mo Nunn Racing	2:12.328	110.126	+8.797
24	26	Paul Tracy (CAN)	Team Green	2:12.695	109.822	+9.164
25	27	Dario Franchitti (GBR)	Team Green	2:22.978	101.923	+19.447
26	51	Adrián Fernández (MEX)	Fernández Racing	—	—	—

== Warm-up ==
The drivers took to the track at 9:30 a.m. local time for a 30-minute warm-up session. Rain continued to fall on the track overnight but stopped before the session began. Kanaan was fastest in the warm-up session with a time of 1:51.743. Dixon and Wilson were second and third. The session was disrupted when Andretti spun in the 11th turn and damaged the right-front quarter of his car upon hitting the wall. Andretti was unhurt.

== Race ==
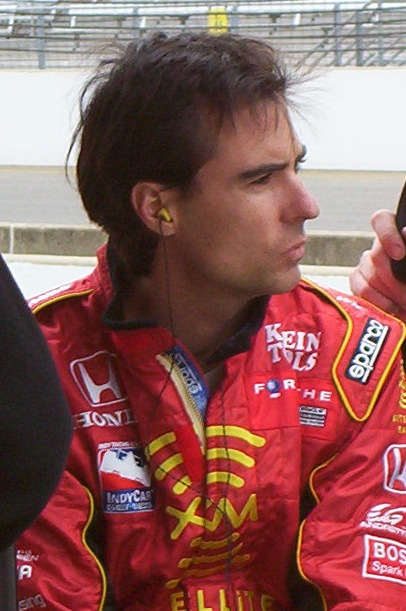
Bryan Herta (pictured in 2004) was injured in accident with Max Wilson on the fifth lap.

A further deluge came over the track with over 1 inch (25 millimetres) of rain falling in less than half an hour. Race officials worked quickly to remove standing water from the track surface. It was announced the race would be a "Wet Start" and all cars were required to start with the rain tires installed. The air temperature ranged from 66 to 75 °F (19 to 24 °C) and the track temperature was between 67 and 90 °F (19 and 32 °C). The race began at 12:15 p.m. local time behind the pace car. The vehicles drove alongside each other to lift the remaining standing water on the track surface. A jet dryer was sent onto the track on lap two to assist in the drying efforts. The pit lane was opened on lap four with teammates Tracy and Franchitti making pit stops. Both drivers rejoined the race at the back of the field. The pace car entered the pit lane at the end of the fifth lap and the cars restarted in a single line. Bräck maintained the lead heading into the first turn. Dixon was blocked by another car, and he was overtaken by de Ferran for third. Farther back, Junqueira clashed wheels with Fittipaldi at the fifth turn, dropping him to the rear of the field.

Junqueira attempted to overtake Fittipaldi but made contact with the right-front section of his car in turn five and spun. He fell from tenth to 20th. Serviá made contact with the Franchetti's front-right leaving turn five and both drivers spun towards the inside wall. They continued without any significant damage. Tagliani temporarily moved ahead of Bräck to claim the lead, but he drove too fast heading into the corner and Bräck was able to reclaim the position. De Ferran took advantage of the manoeuvre by driving on the inside lane, but he could not pass Tagliani. Takagi swerved to avoid the collision between Junqueira and Fittipaldi and Moreno attempted to overtake him around the outside, but both drivers made contact heading into turn nine. Takagi stalled his engine, but he managed to continue. Wilson hit the rear of Herta's car; he went airborne and over the back of it. Both competitors then drifted into the inside wall. Herta's helmet bore tyre marks from the accident. Tracy attempted to avoid the scene by driving around the inside, but he was caught up in the incident because of reduced visibility after driving through spray. No drivers were injured but all three retired from the race. The second caution flag was shown on the same lap. Franchitti, Junqueira, Fittipaldi made pit stops under caution.

Bräck led the field at the lap-10 restart. Andretti passed Dixon for sixth place into the first turn. Dixon hit the rear of Andretti's car, sending him spinning in the center of turn five. He got his car moving in the right direction and continued. The third caution was necessitated on the same lap when Gugelmin lost control of his car after driving through standing water on the backstraight and veered right. He collided heavily with the inside wall. Gugelmin was uninjured, but he retired from the race because of the damage to his vehicle. On lap 11, Takagi hydroplaned in the same area and heavily damaged his car by contacting the inside barrier. All drivers, except for Castroneves, made pit stops for dry tires. The race was stopped three laps later by CART chief steward Chris Kneifel to allow course officials to deal with the standing water on the backstretch, caused by the nearby run-off area collecting water where it then seeped across the track surface. Course officials started to dig a ditch against the inside wall at the scene. CART required all drivers to drive into the pit lane; their mechanics were permitted to alter their cars. The race restarted 47 minutes later with Castroneves, Carpentier and Jourdain leading the field after they had made pit stops for slick tires before it was stopped.

Carpentier unsuccessfully challenged Castroneves on the outside lane on the run to the first corner. Fittipaldi out-braked Bräck at turn five for fourth place. Jourdain then caught Carpentier off guard cresting a hill on the approach to turn six by passing him around the outside to move into second. Half-a-mile later, Bräck was passed by Tagliani who got ahead of him around the outside at the Carousel corner. However, Tagliani went off the circuit while trying to overtake his teammate Carpentier at turn 12 and fell to ninth. At the end of lap 17, Castroneves led Jourdain with Fittipaldi, Carpentier, and Bräck in positions three to five. On lap 21, the sixth caution was given. Entering turn 13, Gidley put a wheel on a damp curb and suddenly lost rear traction. He was propelled toward a concrete support to a nearby bridge at the corner. His car's right-front corner hit it at approximately 145 mph (233 km/h) at a 60 degree angle. Gidley's car was split into two pieces; he flipped and rolled several times before landing upside down in a nearby gravel trap at the outside of the circuit. Debris was scattered across the track, and Dixon collected some of it, which struck his helmet.

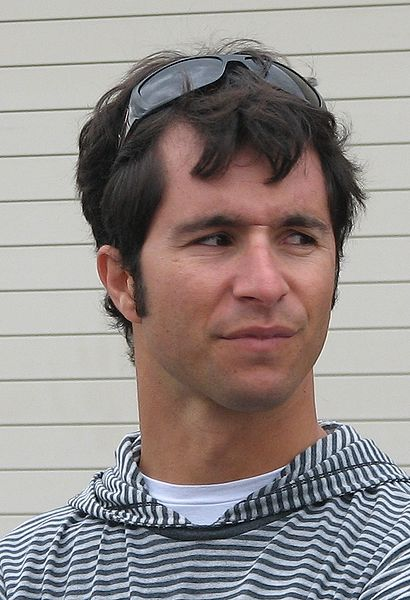
Bruno Junqueira (pictured in 2009) led the final ten laps of the race and took his first career victory in CART

Gidley was briefly knocked unconscious by the impact, but he awoke by the time safety officials came to his aid and he communicated with his team over the radio. Safety workers spent ten minutes extricating Gidley from his wrecked car. He was transported via ambulance to the HSHS St. Nicholas Hospital in Sheboygan, Wisconsin, for precautionary x-rays to his neck and had a CT scan. Jourdain, Fittipaldi, and Bräck entered the pit lane to make stops for fuel during the caution. Castroneves chose not to make a pit stop, and he led the field at the lap-29 restart, followed by Carpentier and de Ferran. Carpentier lost second to de Ferran at turn twelve and he then dropped to fifth after da Matta and Moreno passed him. Franchitti had lost radio communication with his team, and smoke bellowed from the rear of his car due to an engine failed leaving the second corner on lap 32. He pulled off the track at the next turn to retire. Castroneves and his teammate de Ferran, along with all drivers who did not make their pit stops during the caution, entered the pit lane three laps later for fuel stops to enable them to reach the end of the race.

Fittipaldi became the leader with Andretti taking over second. Going into turn five, Andretti drove on the inside lane to try and overtake Fittipaldi. He defended his position by cutting down of Andretti, resulting in the two making side-by-side contact. Fittipaldi sustained a broken front-left suspension arm and was forced to retire at the side of the track because of the significant amount of damage to his car. Andretti had a skewed steering column, but he continued driving. The incident, however, delayed Andretti long enough for him to lose the lead to Junqueira on the inside lane cresting a hill. Junqueira pulled away from Andretti by setting a series of fastest laps to lead by 2.931 seconds by the start of the 40th lap. Zanardi was in third but he could not match the leaders' pace and he lost as much as three seconds to them per lap. Fernández was in fourth place and under pressure from his teammate Nakano in fifth. On lap 42, Andretti, Zanardi and Nakano made their final pit stops. Andretti emerged in third. Junqueira entered the pit lane leading Fernández by 20 seconds on the next lap, returning about 100 ft (30 m) in front of him.

At this point, CART Race Control informed all teams and drivers the race would end after two hours because of the earlier delays. Fernández conserved his fuel usage, and he allowed Andretti through into the second position on the 44th lap. Unhindered in the final two laps, Junqueira crossed the start/finish line after completing 45 laps to clinch his first victory in CART with an average speed of 90.721 mph (146.001 km/h). Andretti followed 2.687 seconds later in second and Fernández completed the podium finishers in third place. Off the podium, Dixon equalled his best result on a road course during the season in fourth. The Brazilian trio of de Ferran, da Matta and Castroneves were in positions five to seven. Tagliani and his fellow Canadian Carpentier finished in eighth and ninth places and Serviá tenth. Outside the top ten, Moreno was eleventh, followed by his fellow Brazilian Kanaan in twelfth. The final finishers were Zanardi, Bräck, Nakano, Papis, and Jourdain. There were a total of six cautions and two lead changes among three different drivers during the course of the race. Castroneves' total of 24 laps in the lead was the most of any competitor. Junqueira led once for a total of ten laps.

=== Post-race ===
Junqueira appeared in the victory lane before going to the podium with the second and third-place finishers to celebrate the first victory of his career in front of the crowd; the win earned him $100,000. He dedicated his victory to his teammate Gidley. "I'm really happy to get my first win, especially on a really tough track like Road America. I was really scared when I saw [Gidley's crash], and I asked about him on the radio and Chip came on and said he was OK. I'm so happy for that." Andretti spoke of an "unbelievable day" for himself and accepted his second-place result despite his collision with Fittipaldi, "There were tough conditions at the start, and I'm glad I wasn't [CART Chief Steward] Chris Kneifel. I don't know what I would have done, probably the same thing. It was just too wet for slicks, and it was just a tough sitiuation." Third-place finisher Fernández commented about the changeable track conditions and improvements made to his car during the red flag, "(Engineer) John (Ward) didn't know if it was going to be a timed race, but once we found out it was going to be a timed race we couldn't race with Michael and Bruno because we had to save fuel. I ran out in Turn 2, so we just made it. The car ran really good all day."

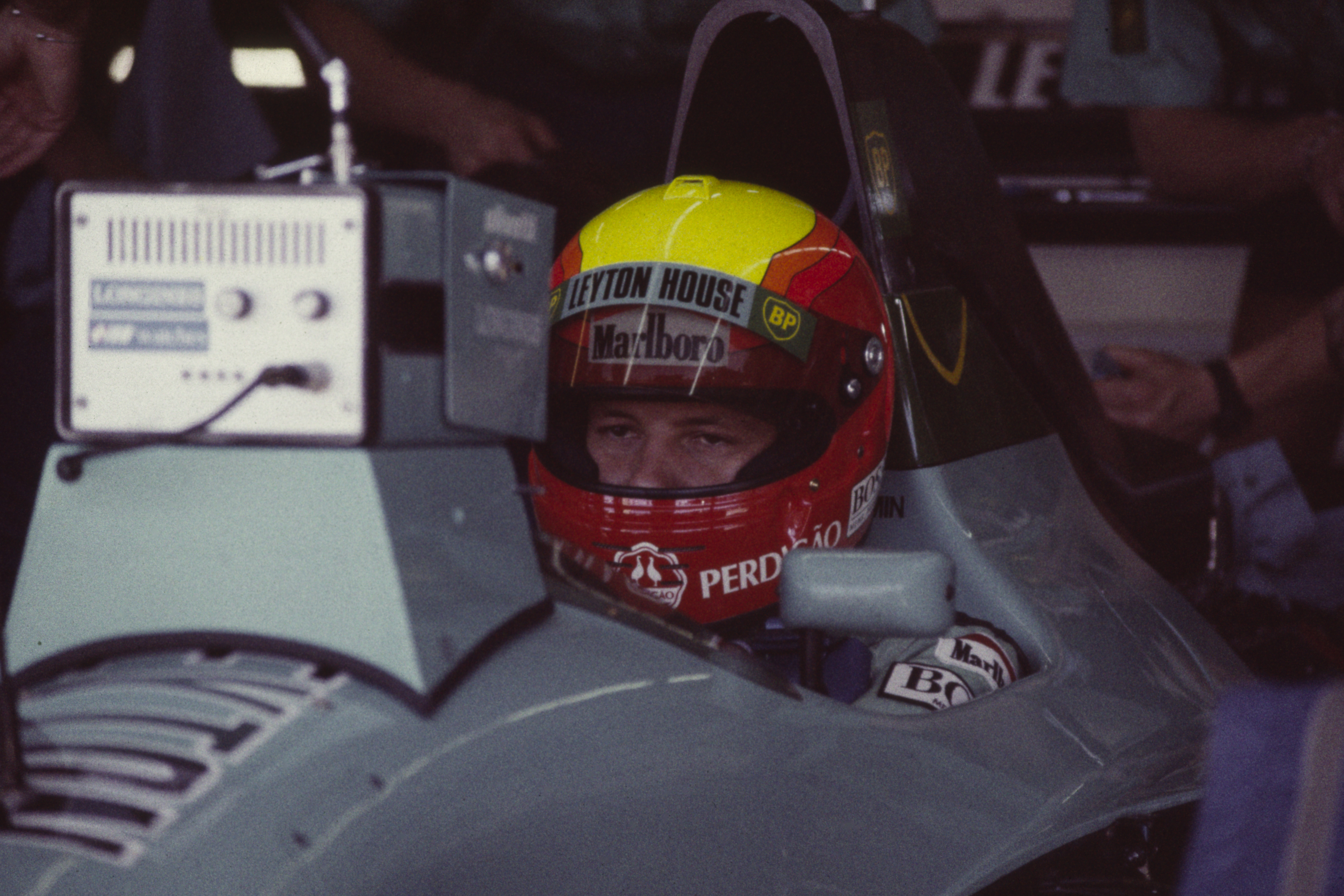
Maurício Gugelmin (pictured in 1991) was critical of CART's decision to start the race with a saturated track on the backstretch.

After x-rays, Gidley was found to have fractured a non-weight bearing portion of the bone in his right thigh. He was evaluated by Terry Tramell in Indianapolis on August 20. Gidley revealed the extent of his injuries the day after being discharged from hospital, "I'm very sore, but not too bad really. I feel like you do after you've been skiing for the first time after a long layoff. When you get off the slopes you feel fine, but when you get up in the morning you can hardly move. I feel like I've got about 25 charley horses all over me." He used crutches to aid in his mobility because his body was sore from his crash; he stopped using them on August 25. Andretti said of his contact with Fittipaldi, "I don't know if Fittipaldi was wearing blinders, but I wasn't the only one he hit out there." Fittipaldi responded by saying he did not anticipate Andretti drawing alongside him, and spoke of his feeling it was slightly optimistic of Andretti to attempt his overtaking manoeuvre, "I doubted our strategy after we made our last stop but it would have ultimately put us in position to challenge Bruno or finish third at the worse but Michael made that an over optimistic pass and my car was too damaged to continue. We could have had a podium finish but ended in 18th. It's a shame for myself and the team after a lot of hard work this weekend."

The decision to start the race on a flooded track on the backstraight came under criticism from figures within CART which was pressured to begin the race because it purchased two hours of airtime on sports network ESPN. Herta disagreed with the decision to start the race with a wet track at turn twelve, and he told his team over the radio that officials made an error in judgement. Gugelmin concurred with his view, saying, "CART never should have started this race with the conditions the way they were. Red-flagging it was the right decision, but it doesn't help me or any of the guys who crashed in this mess. These are racing cars, not powerboats. The whole thing was ridiculous." Kneifel stated he observed the track with safety officials before the race began, and acknowledged his decision-making would come under scrutiny. Criticism was also directed at CART's decision to permit teams to alter their cars during the stoppage. Bräck said he felt this gave Castroneves, Carpentier, Jourdain and Nakano an unfair advantage and prevented from finishing in a higher position. Serviá argued that all the cars should have been put into Formula One style parc fermé conditions, and did not see the logic in allowing teams to adjust and fuel their cars during a red flag period.

The result of the race meant Castroneves became the new leader of the Drivers' Championship with a five-point lead over previous leader Bräck in second. De Ferran remained his hold on third while Andretti's second place advanced him from fifth to fourth. Dixon took fifth from Franchitti. Honda increased its advantage to 35 points over Toyota in the Manufacturers' Championship. Ford Cosworth's results dropped it to third. In the Manufacturers' Championship, Reynard still led but their advantage over Lola had been reduced by four points with seven races left in the season.

=== Race classification ===
Final race classification
Pos	No	Driver	Team	Laps	Time/retired	Grid	Points
1	4	Bruno Junqueira (BRA)	Chip Ganassi Racing	45	2:00:28.453	10	20
2	39	Michael Andretti (USA)	Team Motorola	45	+2.687	7	16
3	51	Adrián Fernández (MEX)	Fernández Racing	45	+10.009	26	14
4	18	Scott Dixon (NZL)	PacWest Racing	45	+14.413	3	12
5	1	Gil de Ferran (BRA)	Team Penske	45	+15.084	4	10
6	6	Cristiano da Matta (BRA)	Newman/Haas Racing	45	+15.934	9	8
7	3	Hélio Castroneves (BRA)	Team Penske	45	+16.939	6	7^{1}
8	33	Alex Tagliani (CAN)	Forsythe Racing	45	+17.629	2	5
9	32	Patrick Carpentier (CAN)	Forsythe Racing	45	+17.848	12	4
10	22	Oriol Servià (ESP)	Sigma Autosport	45	+19.021	18	3
11	20	Roberto Moreno (BRA)	Patrick Racing	45	+19.440	14	2
12	55	Tony Kanaan (BRA)	Mo Nunn Racing	45	+21.225	17	1
13	66	Alex Zanardi (ITA)	Mo Nunn Racing	45	+27.624	23	—
14	8	Kenny Bräck (SWE)	Team Rahal	45	+27.834	1	1^{2}
15	52	Shinji Nakano (JPN)	Fernández Racing	45	+29.216	21	—
16	7	Max Papis (ITA)	Team Rahal	45	+40.478	22	—
17	16	Michel Jourdain Jr. (MEX)	Bettenhausen Racing	45	+54.878	20	—
18	11	Christian Fittipaldi (BRA)	Newman/Haas Racing	35	Crash	9	—
19	27	Dario Franchitti (GBR)	Team Green	31	Engine	25	—
20	12	Memo Gidley (USA)	Chip Ganassi Racing	20	Accident	8	—
21	40	Jimmy Vasser (USA)	Patrick Racing	20	Fuel pressure	11	—
22	5	Toranosuke Takagi (JPN)	Walker Racing	10	Crash	13	—
23	17	Maurício Gugelmin (BRA)	PacWest Racing	9	Crash	15	—
24	77	Bryan Herta (USA)	Forsythe Racing	5	Collision	16	—
25	25	Max Wilson (BRA)	Arciero-Blair Racing	5	Collision	19	—
26	26	Paul Tracy (CAN)	Team Green	5	Collision	24	—

Notes

- ^1— Includes one bonus point for leading the most laps.
- ^2— Includes one bonus point for being the fastest qualifier.

== Standings after the race ==
Drivers' Championship standings
Rank	+/–	Driver	Points
1	1	Hélio Castroneves (BRA)	110
2	1	Kenny Bräck (SWE)	105 (−5)
3		Gil de Ferran (BRA)	99 (−11)
4	1	Michael Andretti (USA)	89 (−21)
5	1	Scott Dixon (NZL)	82 (−28)

Constructors' standings
Rank	+/–	Constructor	Points
1		Reynard (GBR)	250
2		Lola (GBR)	213 (−37)

Manufacturers' standings
Rank	+/–	Manufacturer	Points
1		Honda (JPN)	229
2	1	Toyota (JPN)	194 (−35)
3	1	Ford Cosworth (GBR)	191 (−38)

- Note: Only the top five positions are included for the drivers' standings.

Previous race: 2001 Miller Lite 200	CART FedEx Championship Series; 2001 season	Next race: 2001 Molson Indy Vancouver
Previous race: 2000 Motorola 220	Kohler Grand Prix	Next race: 2002 Grand Prix at Road America
