= Molson Indy Vancouver =

Car race in British Columbia, Canada, 1990–2004

IndyCar / CART / Champ Car
- Location: Concord Pacific Place, Vancouver, British Columbia, Canada; 49°16′34″N 123°6′24″W
- Corporate sponsor: Molson
- First race: 1990
- Last race: 2004
- Most wins (driver): Al Unser Jr. (4)
- Most wins (team): Newman/Haas Racing (3); Team Green (3)
- Most wins (manufacturer): Chassis: Lola (7); Engine: Ford-Cosworth (4); Honda (4)

Circuit information
- Surface: Asphalt/Concrete
- Length: 2.865 km (1.780 mi)
- Turns: 15

Vancouver Street Circuit
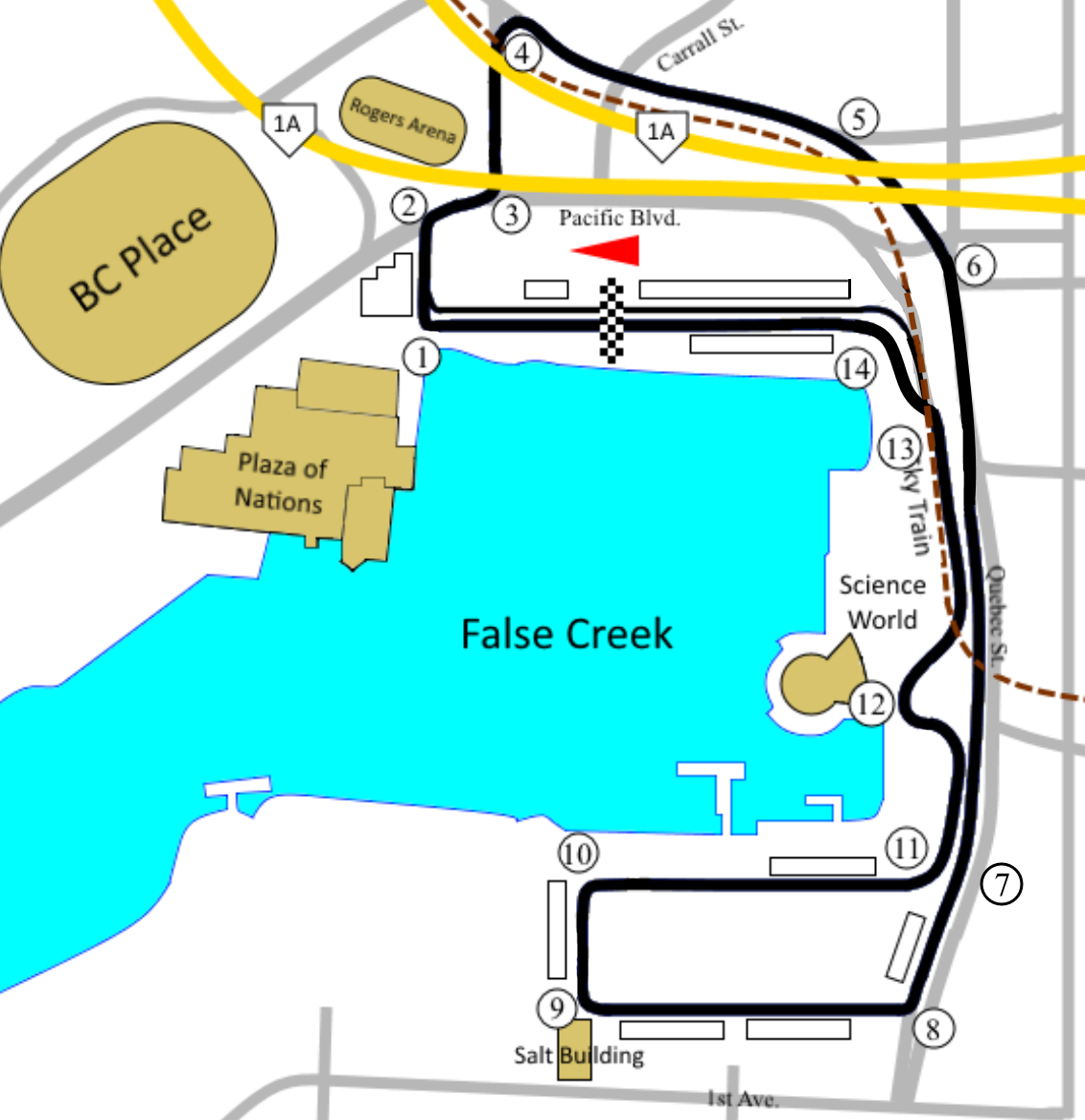
- Vancouver Street Circuit (1999–2004)
- Location: Concord Pacific Place, Vancouver, British Columbia, Canada
- Coordinates: 49°16′34″N 123°6′24″W
- Opened: 30 August 1990; 35 years ago
- Closed: 25 July 2004; 21 years ago
- Major events: Former: CART; Molson Indy Vancouver (1990–2004); Atlantic Championship (1990–1999, 2001, 2004); CASCAR Super Series (2001–2004); Barber Pro Series (2000–2003); Indy Lights (1990, 1992–1998, 2000); Trans-Am Series (1999); SpeedVision World Challenge (1999); North American Touring Car Championship (1996–1997)

Street Circuit (1999–2004)
- Length: 2.865 km (1.780 mi)
- Turns: 14
- Race lap record: 1:01.538 ( (Colombia) Juan Pablo Montoya, Lola B2K/00, 2000, CART)

Street Circuit (1998)
- Length: 2.866 km (1.781 mi)
- Turns: 14
- Race lap record: 1:06.939 ( (Brazil) Hélio Castroneves, Reynard 98I, 1998, CART)

Street Circuit (1994–1997)
- Length: 2.660 km (1.653 mi)
- Turns: 16
- Race lap record: 0:55.136 ( (Italy) Alex Zanardi, Reynard 97I, 1997, CART)

Street Circuit (1991–1993)
- Length: 2.699 km (1.677 mi)
- Turns: 16
- Race lap record: 0:59.513 ( (United States) Bryan Herta, Lola T94/00, 1993, Indy Lights)

Street Circuit (1990)
- Length: 2.740 km (1.703 mi)
- Turns: 17
- Race lap record: 1:10.599 ( (United States) Mark Dismore, Swift DB4, 1990, Formula Atlantic)

Molson Indy Vancouver was an annual Champ Car race held on a temporary street circuit in Vancouver, British Columbia, Canada. Running near BC Place and past Science World, the race was held from 1990 to 2004.

On September 2, 1990, the first race took place on the original circuit, which was won by Al Unser Jr. From 1998, a new circuit was created to the east of the old Pacific Place, where only a small part of the original circuit was used. The circuit was popular with drivers and often produced an entertaining race. For most of its fifteen years, the Vancouver Indy attracted in excess of 100,000 spectators over the course of its weekends, and in 1996 held the Canadian single-day sporting event attendance record until it was beaten by the Formula 1 Canadian Grand Prix in Montreal that year. The final event in 2004 had race day attendance of 63,000 with a total three day turnout of 158,420 spectators. However, from 2004, Vancouver was left off the Champ Car fixture list.

In July 2021 it was announced a new race for the electric-powered FIA Formula E World Championship, the Vancouver ePrix would be run on the reconfigured 2.21 km (1.37 mi) track on the same site. However on 18 June 2022, it was announced that the race contract was terminated.

== Controversy and cancellation ==
For much of its time in Vancouver, the Molson Indy was a source of considerable local controversy, as local residents complained of the noise and disruption caused by this major event. As the lands of the former Expo 86 site were developed into the billion-dollar condominium development by Concord Pacific, debates raged over whether the Indy made Vancouver a "world-class city" or an "urban nightmare." Such debates were chronicled by Mark Douglas Lowes in his 2002 book, Indy Dreams and Urban Nightmares: Speed Merchants, Spectacle, and the Struggle over Public Space in the World-Class City.

The official explanation for the cancellation came from Jo-Ann McArthur, president of sponsoring Molson Sports and Entertainment, who stated that "the bottom line is the business model couldn't work". The race had just two seasons left in the city, due to the impending construction of the Olympic Village for the 2010 Winter Olympics on the south end of the course. She stated that the lack of a long-term commitment to holding the event made it difficult to attract sponsors to continue the race.

Following the cancellation, Champ Car continued to race in the Canadian cities of Toronto, Montreal and Edmonton as part of the 2005 season.

== Layout history ==
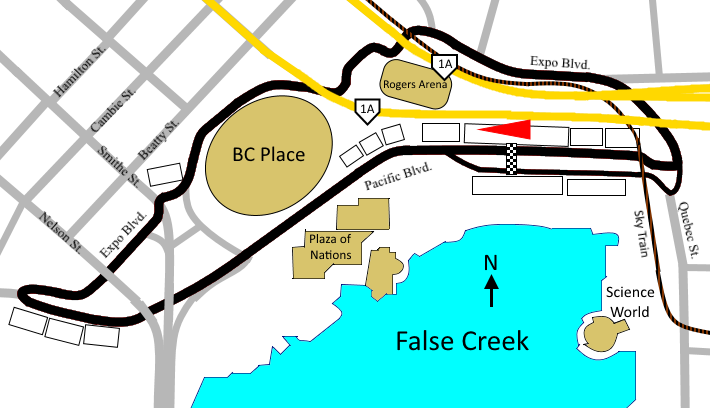
Vancouver Street Circuit (1990–1997)

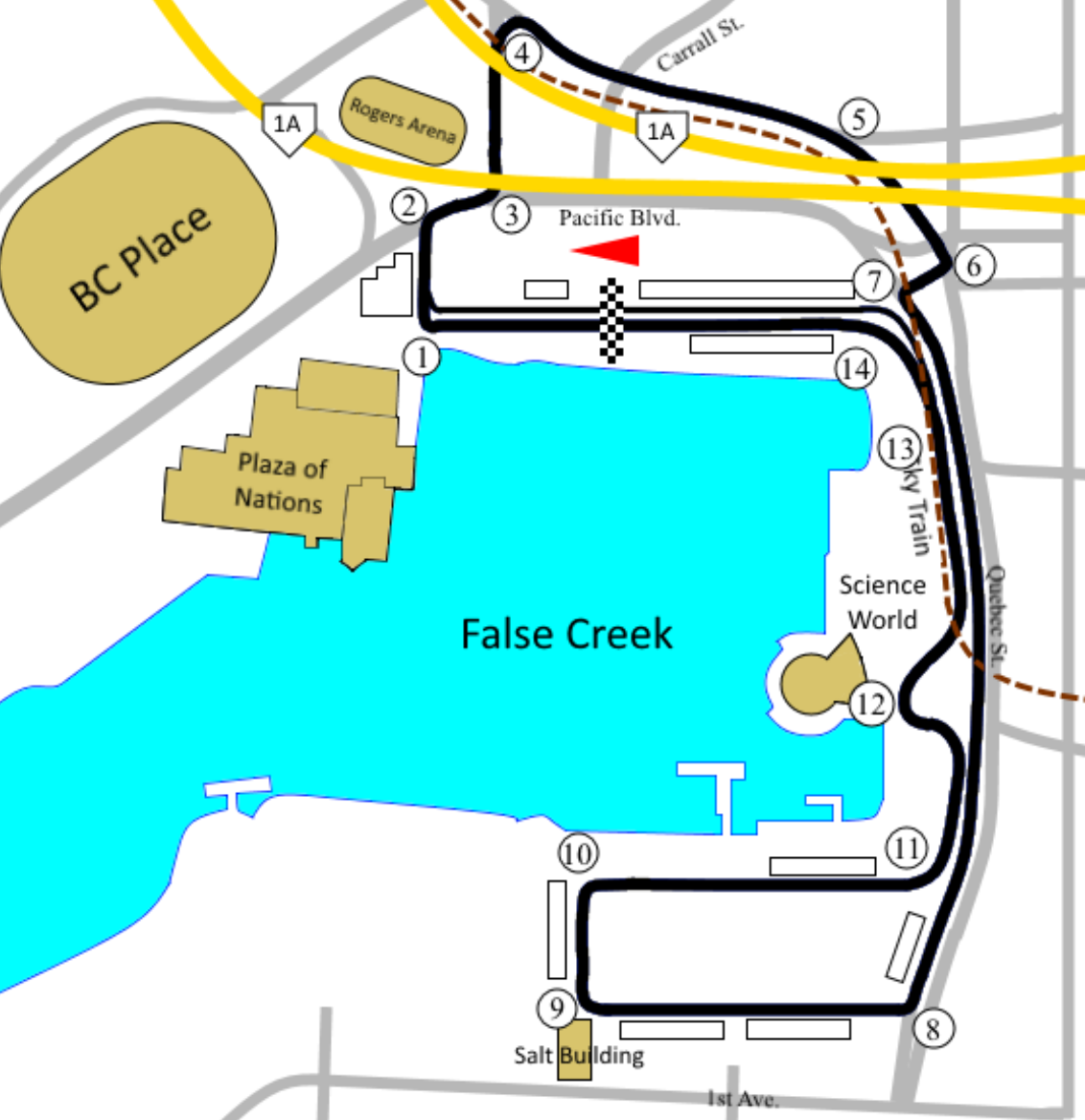
Vancouver Street Circuit (1998)

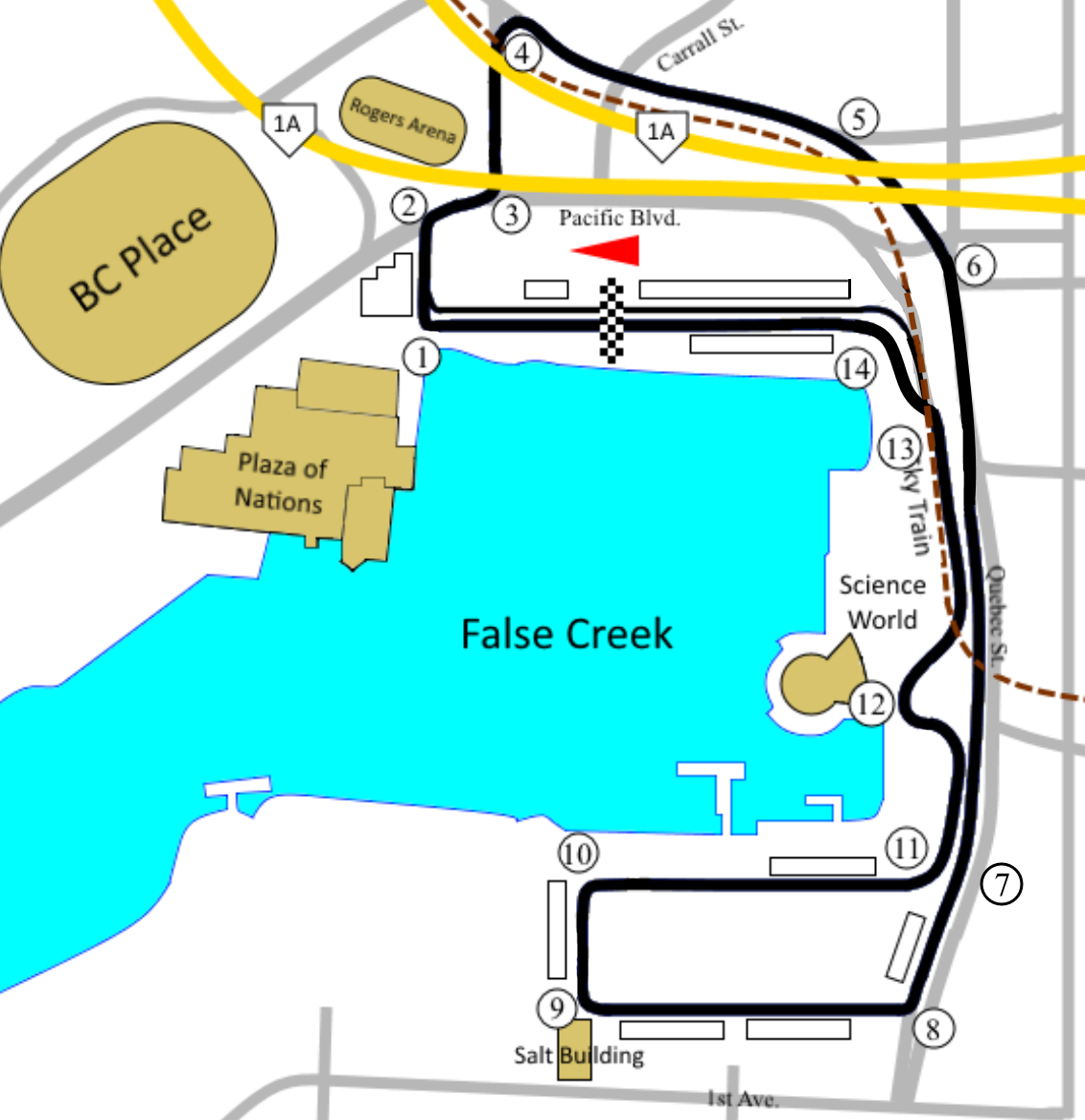
Vancouver Street Circuit (1999–2004), which removed the chicane at the old Turn 7 and added a chicane at Turn 13

== CART/Champ Car race winners ==
| Season | Driver | Chassis | Engine | Team | Report | Ref |
|---|---|---|---|---|---|---|
| 1990 | (United States) Al Unser Jr. | Lola | Chevrolet | Galles-KRACO Racing | Report | |
| 1991 | (United States) Michael Andretti | Lola | Chevrolet | Newman/Haas Racing | Report | |
| 1992 | (United States) Michael Andretti | Lola | Ford-Cosworth | Newman/Haas Racing | Report | |
| 1993 | (United States) Al Unser Jr. | Lola | Chevrolet | Galles Racing | Report | |
| 1994 | (United States) Al Unser Jr. | Penske | Ilmor | Marlboro Team Penske | Report | |
| 1995 | (United States) Al Unser Jr. | Penske | Mercedes-Ilmor | Marlboro Team Penske | Report | |
| 1996 | (United States) Michael Andretti | Lola | Ford-Cosworth | Newman/Haas Racing | Report | |
| 1997 | (Brazil) Maurício Gugelmin | Reynard | Mercedes-Benz | PacWest Racing | Report | |
| 1998 | (United Kingdom) Dario Franchitti | Reynard | Honda | Team KOOL Green | Report | |
| 1999 | (Colombia) Juan Pablo Montoya | Reynard | Honda | Target Chip Ganassi Racing | Report | |
| 2000 | (Canada) Paul Tracy | Reynard | Honda | Team KOOL Green | Report | |
| 2001 | (Brazil) Roberto Moreno | Reynard | Toyota | Patrick Racing | Report | |
| 2002 | (United Kingdom) Dario Franchitti | Lola | Honda | Team KOOL Green | Report | |
| 2003 | (Canada) Paul Tracy | Lola | Ford-Cosworth | Team Player's | Report | |
| 2004 | (Canada) Paul Tracy | Lola | Ford-Cosworth | Forsythe Championship Racing | Report | |

=== Indy Lights/Atlantic winners ===
Indy Lights
| Season | Winning driver |
|---|---|
| 1990 | (Italy) Vinicio Salmi |
| 1991 | Not held |
| 1992 | (United States) Mark Smith |
| 1993 | (United States) Bryan Herta |
| 1994 | (Brazil) André Ribeiro |
| 1995 | (Portugal) Pedro Chaves |
| 1996 | (Canada) Claude Bourbonnais |
| 1997 | (Brazil) Cristiano da Matta |
| 1998 | (Brazil) Cristiano da Matta |
| 1999 | Not held |
| 2000 | (New Zealand) Scott Dixon |

Atlantic Championship
| Season | Winning driver |
|---|---|
| 1990 | (Canada) Claude Bourbonnais |
| 1991 | (Canada) Stéphane Proulx |
| 1992 | (Canada) Patrick Carpentier |
| 1993 | (Canada) Claude Bourbonnais |
| 1994 | (Canada) David Empringham |
| 1995 | (Canada) David Empringham |
| 1996 | (Canada) Patrick Carpentier |
| 1997 | (United States) Memo Gidley |
| 1998 | (Canada) Andrew Bordin |
| 1999 | (United States) Will Langhorne |
| 2000 | Not held |
| 2001 | (United States) Joey Hand |
| 2002 2003 | Not held |
| 2004 | (United Kingdom) Ryan Dalziel |

== Lap records ==
The fastest official race lap records at Molson Indy Vancouver are listed as:

| Category | Time | Driver | Vehicle | Event |
Street Circuit (1999–2004): 2.865 km (1.780 mi)
| CART | 1:01.538 | Juan Pablo Montoya | Lola B2K/00 | 2000 Molson Indy Vancouver |
| Indy Lights | 1:07.439 | Scott Dixon | Lola T97/20 | 2000 Vancouver Indy Lights round |
| Formula Atlantic | 1:09.214 | Jon Fogarty | Swift 014.a | 2004 Vancouver Formula Atlantic round |
| Barber Pro | 1:14.675 | Leonardo Maia | Reynard 98E | 2003 Vancouver Barber Pro round |
Street Circuit (1998): 2.866 km (1.781 mi)
| CART | 1:06.939 | Hélio Castroneves | Reynard 98I | 1998 Molson Indy Vancouver |
| Indy Lights | 1:10.995 | Cristiano da Matta | Lola T97/20 | 1998 Vancouver Indy Lights round |
| Formula Atlantic | 1:15.386 | Rino Mastronardi | Swift 008.a | 1998 Vancouver Formula Atlantic round |
Street Circuit (1994–1997): 2.660 km (1.653 mi)
| CART | 0:55.136 | Alex Zanardi | Reynard 97I | 1997 Molson Indy Vancouver |
| Indy Lights | 1:00.653 | Eddie Lawson | Lola T93/20 | 1994 Vancouver Indy Lights round |
| Formula Atlantic | 1:03.981 | Richie Hearn | Ralt RT41 | 1994 Vancouver Formula Atlantic round |
| Super Touring | 1:10.414 | David Donohue | Dodge Stratus | 1997 Vancouver NATCC round |
Street Circuit (1991–1993): 2.699 km (1.677 mi)
| Indy Lights | 0:59.513 | Bryan Herta | Lola T93/20 | 1993 Vancouver Indy Lights round |
| Formula Atlantic | 1:02.053 | Jamie Galles | Ralt RT40 | 1993 Vancouver Formula Atlantic round |
Original Street Circuit (1990): 2.740 km (1.703 mi)
| Formula Atlantic | 1:10.599 | Mark Dismore | Swift DB4 | 1990 Vancouver Formula Atlantic round |
