= 1998 Molson Indy Vancouver =

(Canada) 1998 Vancouver
Race details
- Race 15 of 19 in the 1998 CART season
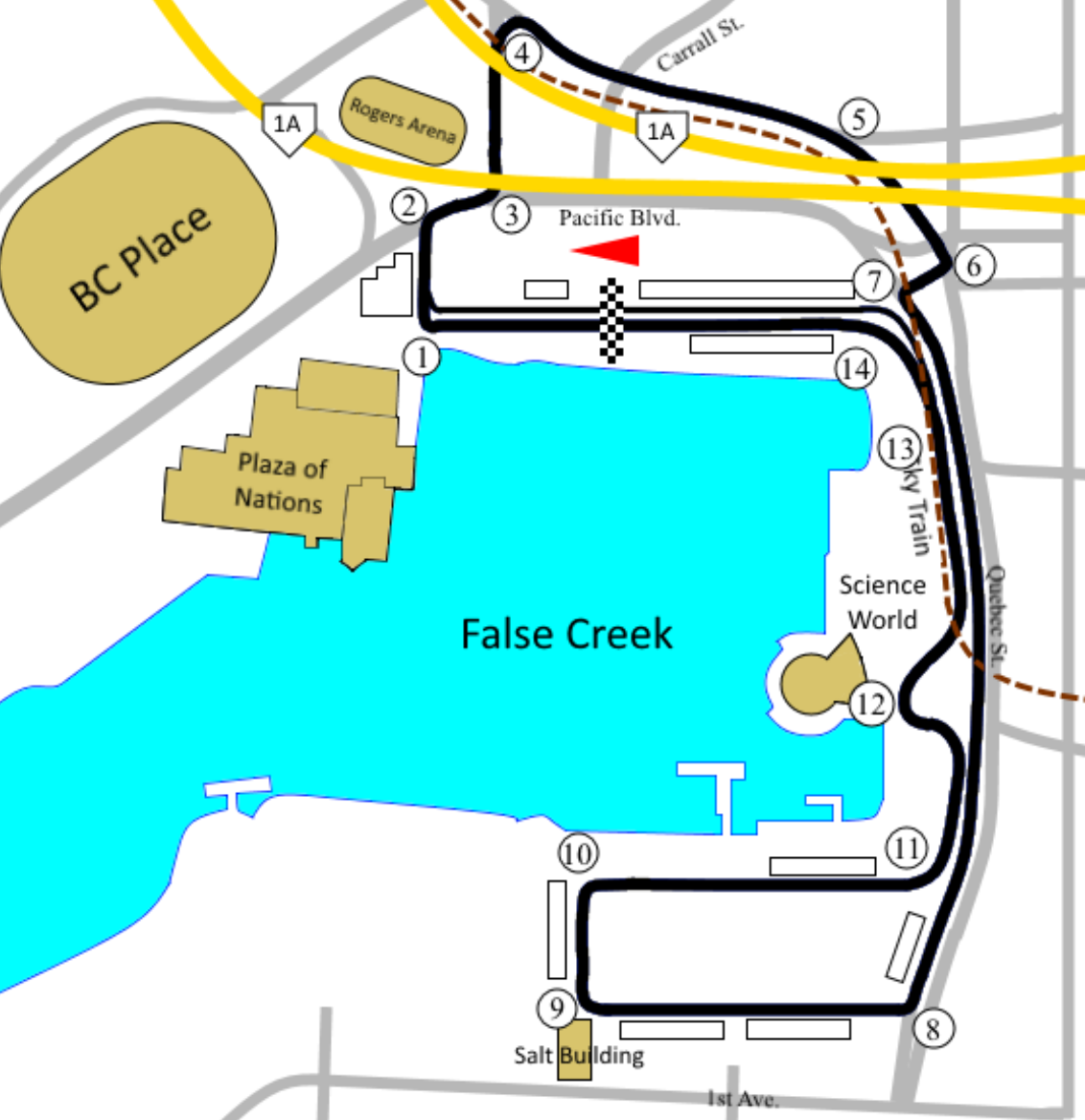
- Date: September 6, 1998
- Official name: 1998 Molson Indy Vancouver
- Location: Concord Pacific Place; Vancouver, British Columbia, Canada
- Course: Temporary street course 1.781 mi / 2.866 km
- Distance: 86 laps 153.166 mi / 246.39 km
- Weather: Temperatures reaching up to 25.3 °C (77.5 °F); dropping down to 20.1 °C (68.2 °F) by the end of the event

Pole position
- Driver: (United Kingdom) Dario Franchitti (Team KOOL Green)
- Time: 1:04.130

Fastest lap
- Driver: (Brazil) Hélio Castro-Neves (Bettenhausen Racing)
- Time: 1:06.939 (on lap 30 of 86)

Podium
- First: (United Kingdom) Dario Franchitti (Team KOOL Green)
- Second: (United States) Michael Andretti (Newman-Haas Racing)
- Third: (United States) Scott Pruett (Patrick Racing)

The 1998 Molson Indy Vancouver was the fifteenth round of the 1998 CART FedEx Champ Car World Series season, held on September 6, 1998, at Concord Pacific Place in Vancouver, British Columbia, Canada. Dario Franchitti took his second consecutive win at this race, after passing Michael Andretti for the lead with seven laps left. In doing so, Franchitti became the first driver to win a race from pole for over a year.

Building an insurmountable lead in the championship standings, Alex Zanardi's 4th-place finish in this race clinched the 1998 CART title with still four races remaining.

This marks the final career podium for Scott Pruett in CART.

== Classification ==
=== Race ===
Pos	No	Driver	Team	Laps	Time/Retired	Grid	Points
1	27	(United Kingdom) Dario Franchitti	Team Green	86	2:00:37.871	1	20+1+1
2	6	(United States) Michael Andretti	Newman-Haas Racing	86	+3.437	6	16
3	20	(United States) Scott Pruett	Patrick Racing	86	+4.745	8	14
4	1	(Italy) Alex Zanardi	Chip Ganassi Racing	86	+5.002	3	12
5	2	(United States) Al Unser Jr.	Team Penske	86	+13.832	22	10
6	17	(Brazil) Maurício Gugelmin	PacWest Racing Group	86	+14.933	13	8
7	3	(Brazil) André Ribeiro	Team Penske	86	+16.246	19	6
8	9	(Finland) JJ Lehto	Hogan Racing	86	+17.565	16	5
9	25	(Italy) Max Papis	Arciero-Wells Racing	86	+19.206	23	4
10	19	(Mexico) Michel Jourdain Jr.	Payton/Coyne Racing	86	+19.625	25	3
11	26	(Canada) Paul Tracy	Team Green	86	+19.759	7	2
12	18	(United Kingdom) Mark Blundell	PacWest Racing Group	86	+20.284	16	1
13	5	(Brazil) Gil de Ferran	Walker Racing	85	Brakes	14	
14	11	(Brazil) Christian Fittipaldi	Newman-Haas Racing	85	+1 Lap	12	
15	40	(Mexico) Adrián Fernández	Patrick Racing	84	+2 Laps	21	
16	10	(United States) Richie Hearn	Della Penna Motorsports	73	Contact	10	
17	34	(United States) Dennis Vitolo	Payton/Coyne Racing	69	Transmission	28	
18	21	(Brazil) Tony Kanaan	Tasman Motorsports Group	67	Contact	5	
19	36	(United States) Alex Barron	All American Racing	62	Contact	27	
20	99	(Canada) Greg Moore	Forsythe Racing	55	Contact	4	
21	98	(United States) P. J. Jones	All American Racing	54	Contact	26	
22	8	(United States) Bryan Herta	Team Rahal	51	Contact	2	
23	24	(United States) Robby Gordon	Arciero-Wells Racing	47	Electrical	24	
24	16	(Brazil) Hélio Castro-Neves	Bettenhausen Racing	41	Fuel	9	
25	7	(United States) Bobby Rahal	Team Rahal	30	Engine	11	
26	12	(United States) Jimmy Vasser	Chip Ganassi Racing	10	Contact	15	
27	33	(Canada) Patrick Carpentier	Forsythe Racing	10	Contact	17	
28	77	(West Germany) Arnd Meier	Davis Racing	6	Contact	20	

== Caution flags ==
Laps	Cause
11-17	Vasser (12), Carpentier (33) contact, Zanardi (1) spin
21-23	Jones (98), Vitolo (34) spin
43-45	Castro-Neves (16) stalled on course
52-55	Herta (8), Hearn (10) contact
57-61	Blundell (18), Moore (99), Jones (98) contact, Fittipaldi (11) spin
64-66	Barron (36) contact
69-70	Kanaan (21), Tracy (26) contact

== Lap Leaders ==
Laps	Leader
1-21	Dario Franchitti
22-41	Hélio Castro-Neves
43-50	Al Unser Jr.
51-62	Alex Barron
63-79	Michael Andretti
80-86	Dario Franchitti

Driver	Laps led
Dario Franchitti	28
Hélio Castro-Neves	20
Michael Andretti	17
Alex Barron	12
Al Unser Jr.	9

== Point standings after race ==
Pos	Driver	Points
1	(Italy) Alex Zanardi	218
2	(United States) Jimmy Vasser	126
3	(Mexico) Adrián Fernández	120
4	(Canada) Greg Moore	119
5	(United Kingdom) Dario Franchitti	110

== Broadcasting ==
=== Television ===
==== United States ====
The Molson Indy Torento was carried live flag-to-flag coverage in the United States on ESPN. Bob Varsha, Danny Sullivan and Tommy Kendall called the race from the broadcast booth. Gary Gerould and Jon Beekhuis handled pit road for the television side.

ESPN
Booth announcers		Pit reporters
Lap-by-lap	Color-commentators	Pit reporters
Bob Varsha	Danny Sullivan; Tommy Kendall	Jack Arute; Gary Gerould

==== Canada ====
The Molson Indy Vancouver was carried live flag-to-flag coverage in Canada on CBC. Brian Williams and Bobby Unser called the race from the broadcast booth. Jack Arute and Greg Creamer handled pit road for the television side.

CBC
Booth announcers		Pit reporters
Lap-by-lap	Color-commentators	Pit reporters
Brian Williams	Bobby Unser	Jack Arute; Greg Creamer
