= Concord Pacific Place =

Planned community in Vancouver, Canada

Coordinates: 49.2762°N 123.1057°W

Concord Pacific Place is "Canada's biggest master-planned urban community" and is projected to be North America's largest in terms of occupants and area when completed. It is located in Vancouver, British Columbia, on the north shore of False Creek. The area was formerly the rail yards of the Canadian Pacific Railway, and was redeveloped into the main site of the 1986 World Exposition.

In 1988, it was purchased by Concord Pacific Developments with investors led by Hongkonger billionaire Li Ka-shing. It was subsequently expanded during Vancouver's recurrent housing booms of the 1990s and 2000s, brought about by greater port traffic and general economic activity, waves of Asian immigration, and the 2010 Winter Olympics. Estimates of the total size of the finished development range from a "[C]$2 billion... 200 acre site comprises approximately 8,000 units of accommodation" to a "[C]$4 billion [site]... [home to] more than 20,000 people on over 200 acres" to "about 50 buildings with 10,000 homes".

In 2010, city councillor Geoff Meggs said that Vancouver City Council wouldn't push Concord Pacific Developments to develop the land on the project.

== See also ==
- Molson Indy Vancouver at Concord Pacific Place

Similar redevelopments

- Old Canadian National rail yard (Edmonton)
- CityPlace, Toronto (also a former rail yard, developed by the same company)
