= Dario Franchitti =

British racing driver (born 1973)

Dario Franchitti MBE
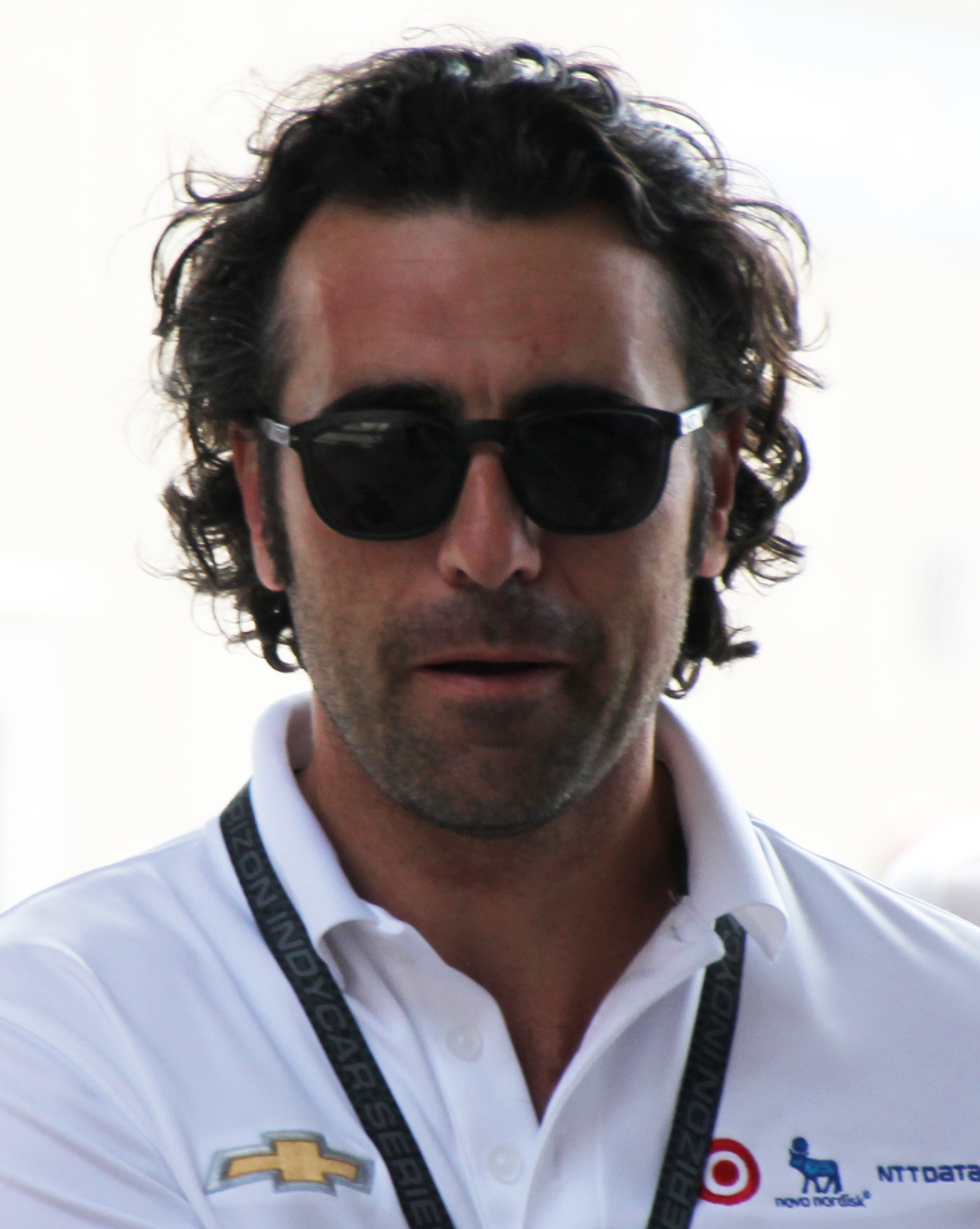
- Franchitti in 2015
- Nationality: (United Kingdom) British
- Born: George Dario Marino Franchitti; 19 May 1973 (age 53) Bathgate, West Lothian, Scotland

Championship titles
- 2007, 2009, 2010, 2011 IndyCar Series Champion; 2007, 2010, 2012 Indianapolis 500 Winner; 2010 IndyCar Series Oval Champion

Awards
- 1992 McLaren Autosport Award; 2001 Greg Moore Legacy Award; 2009 BRDC Gold Star; 2017 Indianapolis Motor Speedway Hall of Fame inductee 2019 Motorsports Hall of Fame of America inductee
Dario Franchitti
IndyCar Series career
- 151 races run over 11 years
- Best finish: 1st (2007, 2009, 2010, 2011)
- First race: 2002 Indianapolis 500 (Indianapolis)
- Last race: 2013 Grand Prix of Houston (Reliant Park)
- First win: 2004 Menards A.J. Foyt 225 (Milwaukee)
- Last win: 2012 Indianapolis 500 (Indianapolis)
Wins	Podiums	Poles
21	59	23
Champ Car career
- 114 races run over 6 years
- Best finish: 2nd (1999)
- First race: 1997 Marlboro Grand Prix of Miami (Homestead)
- Last race: 2002 Mexico Gran Premio Telmex/Gigante (Mexico City)
- First win: 1998 Texaco/Havoline 200 (Road America)
- Last win: 2002 Sure For Men Rockingham 500 (Rockingham UK)
Wins	Podiums	Poles
10	32	11
NASCAR Cup Series career
- 10 races run over 1 year
- Best finish: 49th (2008)
- First race: 2008 Daytona 500 (Daytona)
- Last race: 2008 Lenox Industrial Tools 300 (Loudon)
Wins	Top tens	Poles
0	0	0
NASCAR O'Reilly Auto Parts Series career
- 18 races run over 2 years
- Best finish: 35th (2008)
- First race: 2007 Sam's Town 250 (Memphis)
- Last race: 2008 Food City 250 (Bristol)
Wins	Top tens	Poles
0	2	1
NASCAR FedEx Freight Truck Series career
- 2 races run over 2 years
- 2026 position: 72nd
- Best finish: 72nd (2026)
- First race: 2007 Kroger 200 (Martinsville)
- Last race: 2026 OnlyBulls Green Flag 150 (St. Petersburg)
Wins	Top tens	Poles
0	0	0

George Dario Marino Franchitti MBE (born 19 May 1973) is a British motorsport commentator and semi-retired motor racing driver. He won the IndyCar Series Drivers' Championship in 2007, 2009, 2010 and 2011; the Indianapolis 500 in 2007, 2010 and 2012; and the 2008 24 Hours of Daytona driving for Andretti Green Racing (AGR) and later Chip Ganassi Racing (CGR).

Franchitti began kart racing at the age of ten and had early success before progressing to car racing at the age of seventeen, winning the 1991 Formula Vauxhall Junior Championship and the 1993 Formula Vauxhall Lotus Championship. In 1995 and 1996, he competed in the Deutsche Tourenwagen Meisterschaft and the related International Touring Car Championship for the AMG-Mercedes team, winning two races. Franchitti debuted in Championship Auto Racing Teams (CART) with Hogan Racing for the 1997 season. The following year, he joined Team Green and finished third in the championship with three victories. After tying Juan Pablo Montoya on points and winning four fewer races than Montoya, Franchitti finished second in the 1999 season. His form declined over the next three years but he won four races.

In the Indy Racing League in 2003, Franchitti joined the renamed AGR team but injury limited him to three races that year. He won two races in the 2004 and 2005 seasons, finishing fourth and sixth overall. Franchitti won his first IndyCar Drivers' Championship in 2007 with four victories, including his first Indianapolis 500 win, before joining CGR for the following year's NASCAR programme. In 2009, he returned to IndyCar, winning three consecutive championships from 2009 to 2011, and 12 more races, including the 2010 Indianapolis 500. Franchitti's form deteriorated during the 2012 championship as he struggled to adapt to a new car but he won his third Indianapolis 500. Following contact with Takuma Sato's car in the penultimate round of the 2013 season, Franchitti sustained two fractured vertebrae, a broken ankle and concussion, bringing his racing career to an end.

Franchitti competed in 265 races in American open-wheel car racing, winning 31 and finishing on the podium 92 times. After retiring, Franchitti became an advisor and driver-coach for CGR, as well as a co-commentator and driver pundit on the all-electric Formula E racing series' television world feed. He has been inducted into the Long Beach Motorsports Walk of Fame, the Indianapolis Motor Speedway Hall of Fame, the Motorsports Hall of Fame of America the Scottish Sports Hall of Fame, the Canadian Motorsport Hall of Fame, and was named the 2007 BBC Scotland Sports Personality of the Year.

== Early life and family background ==
George Dario Marino Franchitti was born in Bathgate, West Lothian, Scotland, on 19 May 1973. He is the son of Inverness-born tourist board employee Marina Franchitti, and ice-cream parlour owner and amateur racing driver George Franchitti. He is of Italian descent; three of his grandparents originate from the town of Cassino. His younger brother Marino, his cousin Paul di Resta and his godson Sebastian Melrose are also racing drivers. Franchitti has a sister. When Franchitti was eight years old, he moved to Whitburn. He was educated at Edinburgh's private Stewart's Melville College, where he did not feel at ease due to its traditionalism.

== Junior career ==
When he was three years old, Franchitti was given a Honda-powered go-kart. His wish to become a racing driver began when his father took him to the West of Scotland Kart Club and other kart tracks as a child. When he turned ten, Franchitti started kart racing; his first race ended after two laps due to engine failure. He started racing at the West of Scotland Kart Club and tracks in the north of Scotland, and he tested karts at Knockhill near Dunfermline. In 1984, at the age of eleven, Franchitti won the Scottish Junior Championship; he also won the British Junior Karting Championships in 1985 and 1986. Franchitti retired from the 1987 Karting World Championship final after colliding with Luca Badoer. In 1988, he won the Scottish Senior Championship and was runner-up in the 1989 British Senior Karting Championship. Franchitti raced part-time in the 1990 British Senior Kart Series. Overall, Franchitti won more than one-hundred races and twenty karting titles.

In 1990, racing driver David Leslie's father suggested to Franchitti he join Leslie's team and work on his cars at races. Aged 17, Franchitti began racing a single-seater vehicle for David Leslie Racing in the inaugural Formula Vauxhall Junior Championship. Franchitti's father remortgaged the family home to pay for his son's racing. Franchitti won the championship with four victories, three in the final three rounds, and three podium finishes. Paul Stewart Racing (PSR) offered Franchitti a Formula Vauxhall test after a team member observed him driving. Team owner Jackie Stewart promised Franchitti if he drove for PSR, Stewart would find funding from Scottish sponsors. Stewart became Franchitti's informal coach, teaching him how to race more quickly and more consistently. Franchitti finished fourth overall in the 1992 Formula Vauxhall Lotus Championship, with multiple second and third-place finishes for PSR. Later that year, he won the Autosport BRDC Award, which included a test in a McLaren MP4/10B Formula One (F1) car at Jerez at the end of 1995.

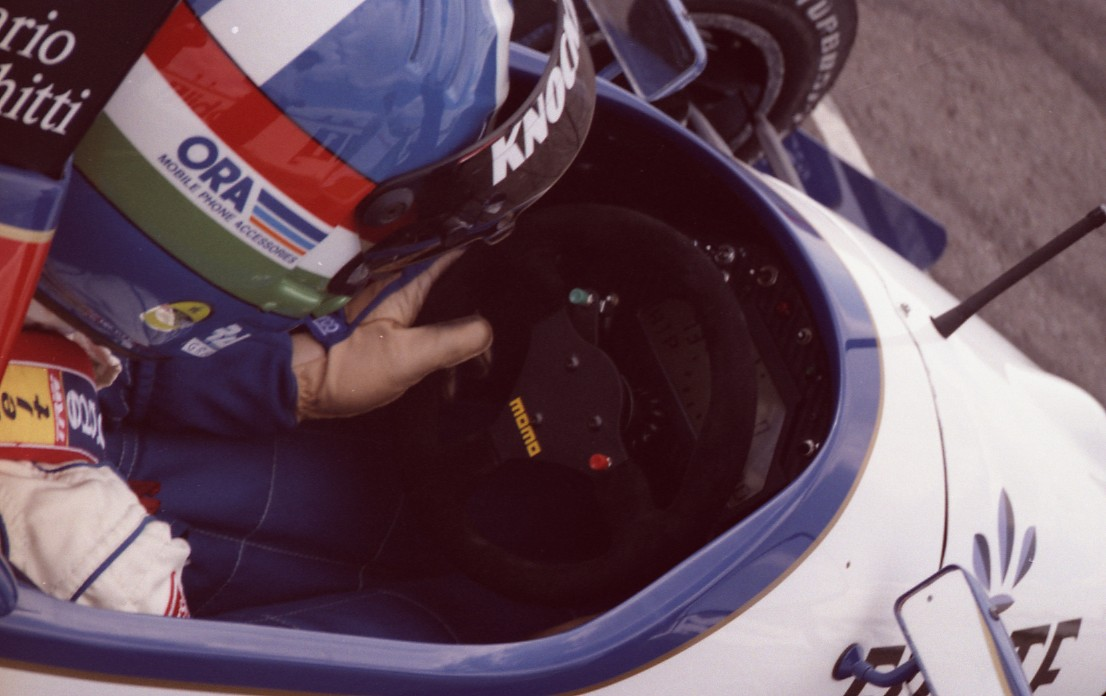
Franchitti driving in British F3 at Thruxton, 1994

The following year, Franchitti became a racing school instructor, and earned money running circuit days for BMW and Nissan. He returned to the Formula Vauxhall Lotus Championship for PSR in a single-seat Vauxhall-powered car, winning the championship at Brands Hatch in August of that year with three races remaining. Franchitti had six victories and four podium finishes, and was named the series' Driver of the Year. The same year, he raced in the Silverstone round of the British Formula Three (F3) Championship, finishing fifth in a PSR Reynard 933-Mugen Honda. Stewart promoted Franchitti to the British F3 Championship in 1994, hoping he would later progress to F1, and he was expected to challenge for the title. Franchitti finished fourth overall with 133 points in a PSR Dallara F394-Mugen Honda, a single victory at Silverstone and six top-three finishes after errors prevented him from challenging for the title. Franchitti also finished twelfth at the 1994 Masters of Formula 3 and sixth at the 1994 Macau Grand Prix.

== Touring car career ==
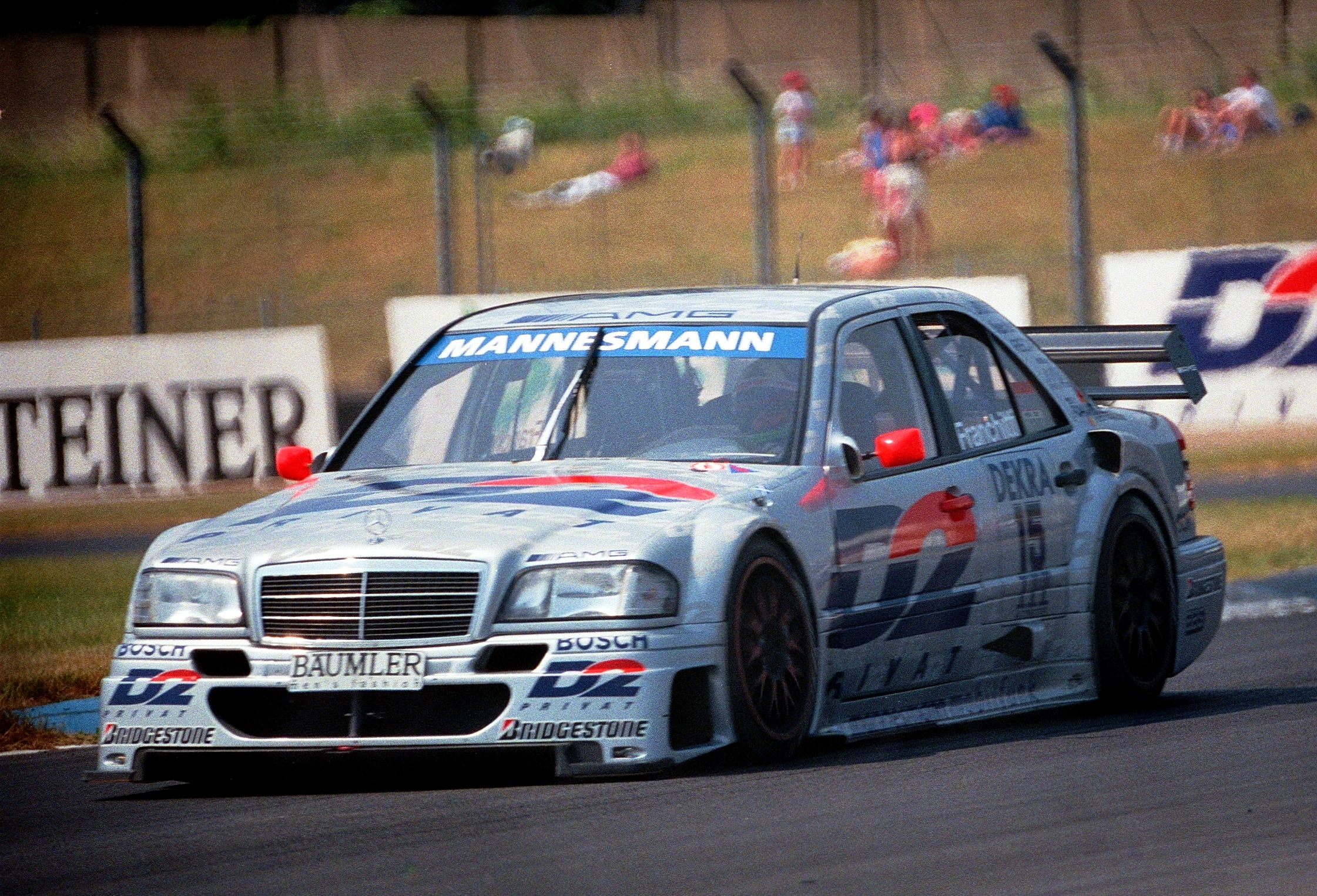
Franchitti competing in the 1995 International Touring Car Series round at Donington Park

Franchitti did not have enough money to progress to Formula 3000 and did not race in F3 for another season as expected because he did not want to incur more debt. Mercedes-Benz signed him to its junior team just in its attempt to recreate its Young Driver Programme in the German-based Deutsche Tourenwagen Meisterschaft (DTM) and the related International Touring Car Championship (ITC) series after their first option, Giancarlo Fisichella, wanted a one-year deal that would leave him the option of driving for Minardi in F1. Franchitti drove a Mercedes C-Class V6 for the AMG-Mercedes team, Mercedes-Benz's sports-car competition division.

Franchitti competed in the 1995 DTM and the 1995 ITC. His fourteen-race DTM season put him fifth in the Drivers' Championship with two pole positions, four podium finishes and 74 points. During the ITC season, Franchitti won his first touring car race at Mugello, twice finished second at Donington Park, and third at the second Estoril round for third in the Drivers' Championship with eighty points. For the 1996 ITC season, he stayed with AMG-Mercedes and finished fourth in the Drivers' Championship with 171 points and five podium finishes, and won the first Suzuka round.

== Championship Auto Racing Teams ==
=== 1997–1999 ===
At the end of 1996, the ITC folded due to escalating costs and Franchitti told Ilmor boss Paul Morgan he wanted to compete in the US-based Championship Auto Racing Teams (CART) series. Jackie Stewart sent a letter of recommendation to trucking mogul Carl Hogan, who telephoned Mercedes in Germany, and the company assigned Franchitti to drive the No. 9 Reynard 97i-Mercedes-Benz car for the single Hogan Racing customer car squad in the 1997 CART World Series. Franchitti rejected the offer of a seven-year contract from McLaren owner Ron Dennis to test McLaren's F1 cars during the week while he competed in CART at weekends and act as a replacement driver in case of injury.

Franchitti debuted at the season-opening Grand Prix of Miami. Starting from thirteenth, he crashed after running wide to allow race leader Gil de Ferran to lap him. In the following race, Franchitti achieved his best result of the season, finishing in ninth place at the 1997 Sunbelt IndyCarnival. He scored points in three more races, and at the Molson Indy Toronto, he took his first CART pole position. Before the season's final race at California Speedway, Hogan dismissed Franchitti due to their strained relationship, which was due to Franchitti joining Team Green for the following season. Franchitti was replaced by Robby Gordon. Franchitti was 22nd in the Drivers' Championship with 10 points and was third in the Rookie of the Year standings.

In late 1997, Franchitti signed a two-year-minimum contract to drive for Team Green from the 1998 season after impressing team owner Barry Green with his abilities. Franchitti had six top-ten finishes, including a second-place finish at the Toyota Grand Prix of Long Beach, and qualified in pole position at the Rio 400, the Molson Indy Toronto and the Miller Lite 200 in the season's first 13 races. At the season's 14th race, the Texaco/Havoline 200, Franchitti took his first series victory, and the first Champ Car win for a Scottish driver since Jim Clark in the 1965 Indianapolis 500. Three weeks later, Franchitti won the Molson Indy Vancouver from his fourth pole position of the season. After finishing fourth at the Honda Grand Prix of Monterey, he led every lap of the rain-shortened Texaco Grand Prix of Houston in his third and final victory of 1998. Franchitti finished second at the Honda Indy 300 but lost the runner-up spot to Jimmy Vasser when his engine failed at the season-ending Marlboro 500, which Vasser won. Franchitti was third overall and scored 160 points.

Before the 1999 CART season, Franchitti signed a two-year contract extension with Team Green through to the end of the 2000 season; he did not want to be indefinitely retained and wanted keep his options open for the future. Franchitti's manager Craig Pollock advised him to remain in CART to gain more experience and he rejected an offer to join Stewart Grand Prix in F1. Franchitti took seven top-ten finishes in the first ten races. He led all of the Molson Indy Toronto to win and took the championship lead from Juan Pablo Montoya after winning the ITT Automotive Detroit Grand Prix two races later. Over the next five rounds, Franchitti won four top-ten places and pole position in the Miller Lite 200. He won the season's penultimate round the Honda Indy 300 from pole position to enter the season-ending Marlboro 500 nine points ahead of Montoya. Franchitti had to finish third in California to win the title but would lose on countback if he and Montoya finished with the same number of points. Franchitti finished the race tenth and Montoya fourth, ending the season with the same number of points as the latter, who was crowned champion because he won seven races while Franchitti had only won three.

=== 2000–2002 ===
Prior to the 2000 CART season, Franchitti was hospitalised after a crash during pre-season testing at Homestead; part of the car's suspension hit his head, and he sustained displaced fractures in his left hip and pelvis, and multiple minor brain contusions. The accident affected Franchitti's concentration, balance, memory and fatigue levels, as well as developing a more serious mindset. As a result, Franchitti underwent physical therapy five times a week, before CART's medical director Steve Olvey declared him fit that March. His performance deteriorated due to a lack of testing and his team changing personnel, and he drove an unreliable car he occasionally crashed. Franchitti finished second at the Firestone Firehawk 500 and the Molson Indy Vancouver, his best finishes of the season, in which he scored two pole positions and six more top-ten finishes—including third place at the Michigan 500 and the Honda Grand Prix of Monterey. Franchitti was 13th in the championship with 92 points.

Team Green retained Franchitti for the 2001 season; he signed a contract extension with the team in August 2000. The season's opening eight rounds saw Franchitti achieve six top-ten finishes, including a second-place finish at the Tenneco Automotive Grand Prix of Detroit. At the Marconi Grand Prix of Cleveland, Franchitti qualified fourteenth, passing race leader Memo Gidley with ten laps remaining for his seventh career CART victory. His performance for the rest of the season was sub-par, with four top-ten and two second-place finishes at both Harrah's 500 and the Texaco/Havoline Grand Prix of Houston. Franchitti concluded the season seventh in the championship standings with 105 points.

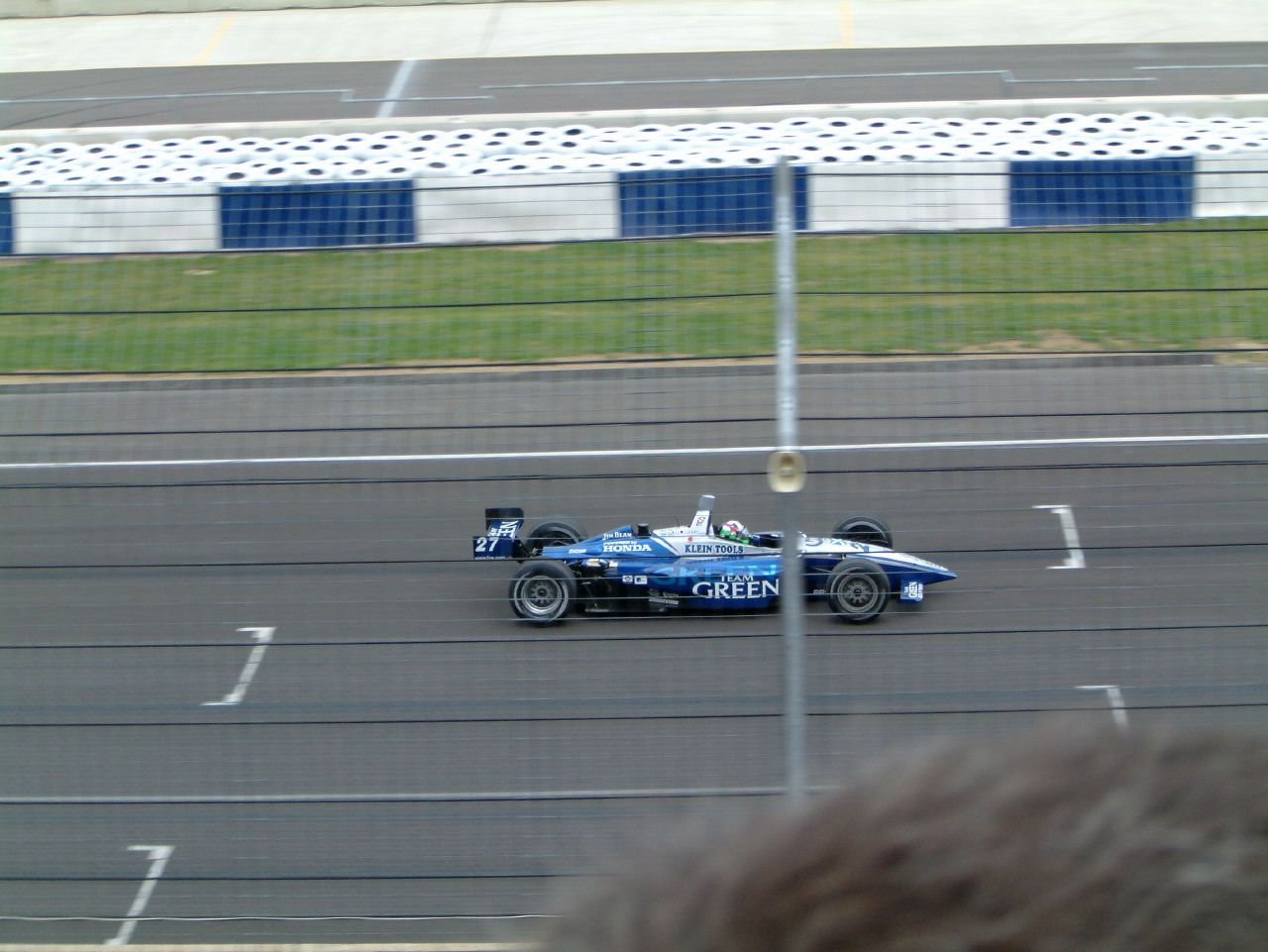
Franchitti racing for Team Green in the 2002 Sure for Men Rockingham 500

After signing another two-year contract extension through to the conclusion of the 2003 season in August 2001, Franchitti returned to Team Green for the 2002 CART season. He finished second at the season-opening Tecate/Telmex Monterrey Grand Prix and took three third-place finishes at the Bridgestone Potenza 500, G.I. Joe's 200 and the following CART Grand Prix of Chicago, starting from pole position in Chicago. Franchitti led the final fifteen laps of the Molson Indy Vancouver after teammate Paul Tracy's pit stop for fuel and tyres, and had his first win of the season. Three races later, starting from second, Franchitti led 43 laps to win the Molson Indy Montreal. He won in the Sure for Men Rockingham 500 in his only CART oval track victory two races later. Franchitti finished the season's final four races within the top ten to place fourth in the Drivers' Championship with 148 points.

== IndyCar Series and stock car racing ==
=== 2002–2004 ===
Franchitti made his debut in CART's rival franchise the Indy Racing League (IRL) in the 2002 IRL season, driving Team Green's unique No. 27 Dallara IR02-Chevrolet Indy V8 entry for the Indianapolis 500 after the team found funding for the programme. Starting from 28th, Franchitti sustained a puncture after making a pit stop and was restricted to a nineteenth-place finish.

Although he wanted to remain a CART driver because of the series' competition and variety, Franchitti moved to the IRL for the 2003 season with the renamed Andretti Green Racing team (AGR) following his rejection of an offer to drive for Newman/Haas Racing in place of Christian Fittipaldi. (Note: Franchitti rejected suggestions made on motorsport websites that money was a factor in the move.) Franchitti changed his driving style to handle the lighter and more responsive normally-aspirated, V8-engined car on short oval circuits, and improved his hand-eye-foot coordination. After competing in the season's first two races, finishing seventh in the season-opening round at Homestead, Franchitti fractured his lumbar vertebrae in an motorbike accident during a trip to West Lothian that April. Franchitti was replaced by Dan Wheldon, Robby Gordon and Bryan Herta in the following three races. Franchitti finished fourth in the Honda Indy 225—his season's best finish—before requiring season-ending keyhole surgery to strengthen his back. Franchitti was replaced by Herta for the rest of the season.

Franchitti extended his contract to remain at AGR for the 2004 IndyCar Series. After crashing out of the season's opening two races at Homestead and Phoenix International Raceway, Franchitti had the first top-ten finish of his campaign at Motegi. He gained his first IndyCar pole position in the Bombardier 500 and finished the race in second place. Four races later, in the Menards A. J. Foyt 225, he led a race-high 111 laps to clinch his first IndyCar victory. Three races later, Franchitti had his second series win in the Honda Indy 225 at Pikes Peak. For the rest of the season, Franchitti finished no higher than third and placed sixth in the championship standings with 409 points.

=== 2005–2008 ===
Franchitti returned to drive for AGR in the 2005 season after signing a one-year contract extension for a four-car team in January 2005. A second-place finish at the season's seventh round at Richmond Raceway was his best result over the season's opening nine rounds. Franchitti's first win of 2005 was the Firestone Indy 200, overtaking Patrick Carpentier with seven laps remaining. The following seven rounds saw Franchitti achieve two more podium finishes with a second-place finish at the next race at the Milwaukee Mile and a third-place result at Watkins Glen International. At the season's final race, the Toyota Indy 400, Franchitti qualified on pole position and held off teammate Tony Kanaan for his second victory of the season. Franchitti finished fourth overall with 498 points.

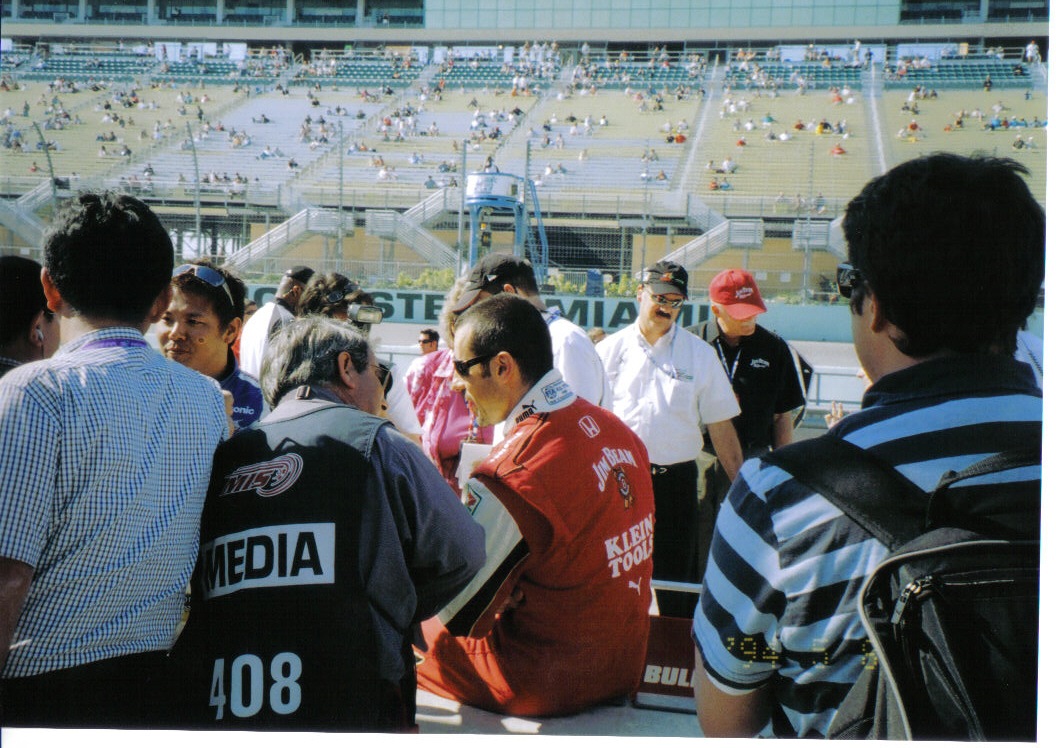
Franchitti after qualifying for the 2006 Toyota Indy 300 at Homestead–Miami Speedway

At the season's conclusion, Franchitti almost declined an opportunity during negotiations to sign a one-year contract extension because he had been considering either a career change or retirement since his sub-par results in IndyCar; Frachitti, however, remained at AGR for the 2006 season. His performance declined after Team Penske and Chip Ganassi Racing (CGR) became more developed when IndyCar used only Honda engines, and AGR underperformed on short high-speed oval tracks. He took pole position for the Honda Grand Prix of St. Petersburg street course race where suspension failure after colliding with Kosuke Matsuura's damaged car eliminated him from contention. Franchitti qualified 17th for the Indianapolis 500 and came seventh after a late race pit stop for fuel. His final eight races yielded a season-best finish of second at the Indy Grand Prix of Sonoma and four top-nine finishes. Before the season-ending round at Chicagoland Speedway, the Peak Antifreeze Indy 300, Franchitti sustained a concussion in a vintage car accident at the Goodwood Revival and was replaced by A. J. Foyt IV. He was eighth in the points standings with 311 points.

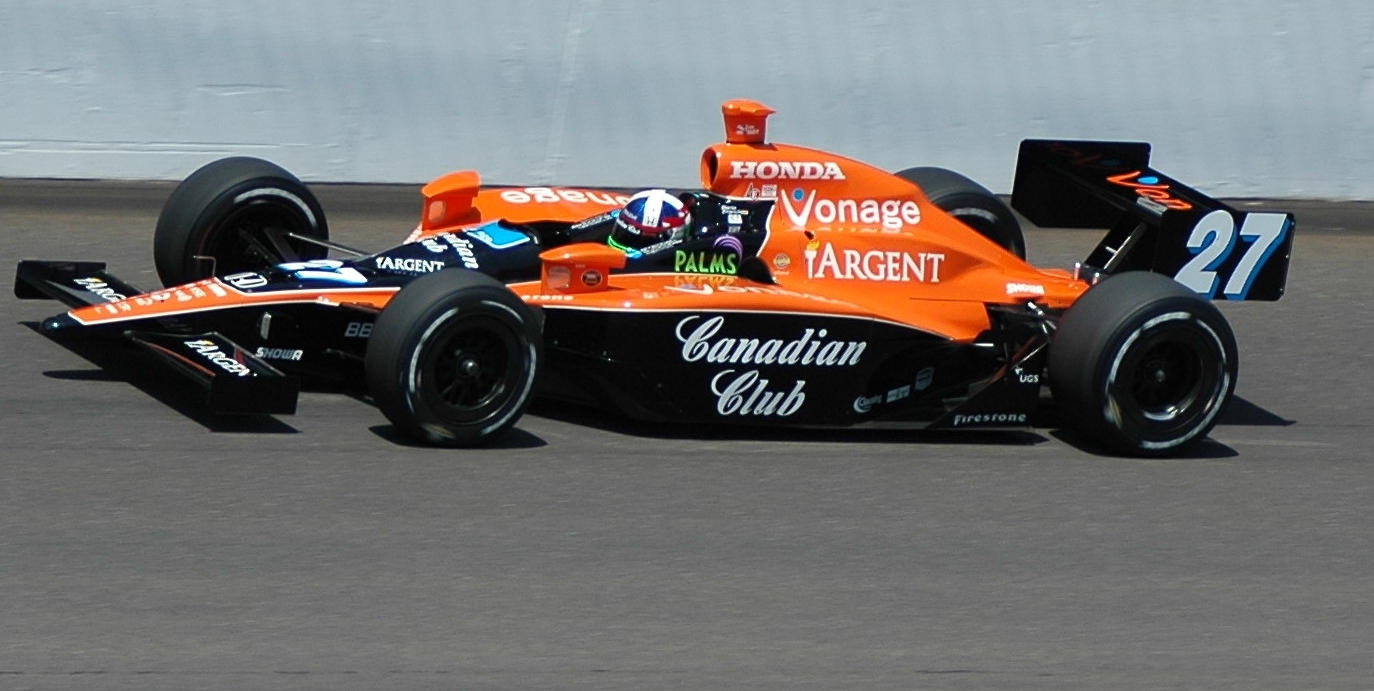
Franchitti practising for the 2007 Indianapolis 500

For the 2007 season, Franchitti again drove for AGR. He began the year by finishing the opening four races seventh and above, including podium finishes at Motegi and Kansas Speedway. Franchitti's season highlight was the Indianapolis 500, which he won after rain ended it early after 166 laps, and became the race's first Scottish winner since Clark in 1965. After finishing second at the ABC Supply Company A.J. Foyt 225 to take the championship lead, Franchitti won consecutive races in the inaugural Iowa Corn Indy 250 at Iowa Speedway, and led a race-high 242 laps in the SunTrust Indy Challenge from pole position. Franchitti took two pole positions at Michigan International Speedway and Infineon Raceway and four top-three finishes over the next seven races to enter the season-ending Peak Antifreeze Indy 300 three points ahead of CGR's Scott Dixon. Franchitti won the race after Dixon's car ran out of fuel on the final lap, securing his first IndyCar championship.

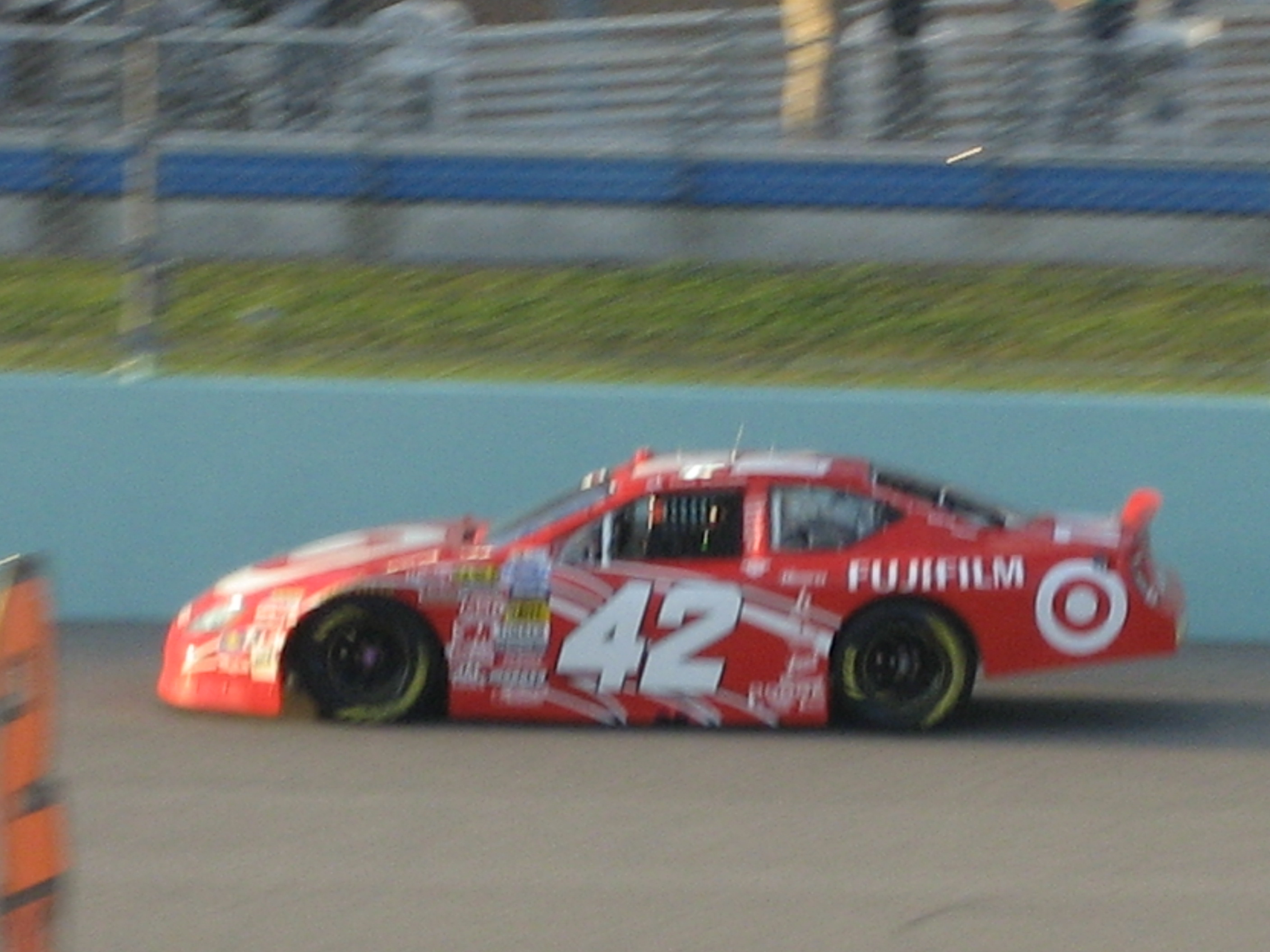
Franchitti driving the No. 42 Chip Ganassi Racing Dodge Charger in the 2007 Ford 300

Franchitti considered joining NASCAR but discussions with CGR team owner Chip Ganassi and Richard Childress Racing owner Richard Childress did not result in a race seat. Talks with Ganassi resulted in Franchitti replacing David Stremme as the driver of the No. 40 Dodge Charger on a multi-year contract from 2008 because of Stremme's sponsorship problems, and because they believed Franchitti was more marketable, (Note: Negotiations stalled in late September 2007 because of Franchitti's obligations to AGR and an early release was not agreed upon.) a decision that greatly upset AGR. Franchitti was enrolled onto a stock car development programme that involved ARCA and the Busch Series events, as well as testing. (Note: He did not enter the 2008 Indianapolis 500 since it was not part of CGR's plans for him in 2008.) He made his stock car racing debut in the ARCA Re/Max 250, qualifying seventh and finishing seventeenth in the No. 42 CGR Dodge. Two weeks later, Franchitti entered one race in the Craftsman Truck Series—the Kroger 200—for CGR in Cunningham Motorsports' No. 41 Dodge Ram, starting 30th and finishing 33rd after an accident.

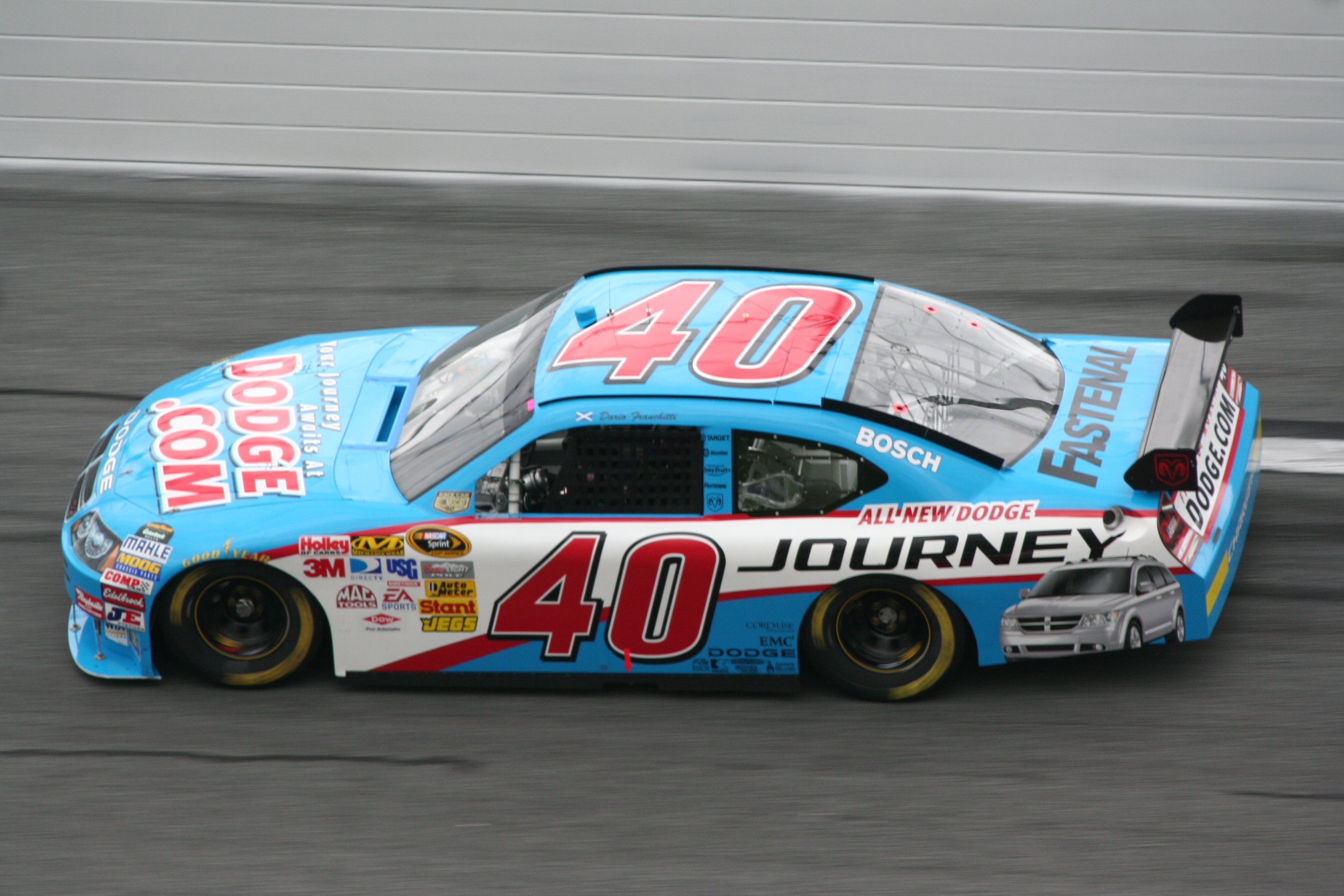
Franchitti driving in the 2008 Daytona 500

In the 2007 Busch Series, Franchitti drove in four races in CGR's No. 42 Dodge Charger, achieving a best starting position of third in the Sam's Town 250 and a best finish of 25th in the O'Reilly Challenge. During the 2008 NASCAR Sprint Cup Series, he entered fourteen races, qualified for ten with an average start of 28.4 and finish of 34.3 with two did not finishes. Franchitti's season-best finish was a 22nd place in the Goody's Cool Orange 500 and his best qualifying performance was seventh in the Lenox Industrial Tools 301. He fell outside the top-35 in the points standings that he had inherited from the preceding season and was required to qualify on speed from the sixth race onwards, because his car was uncompetitive since CGR could not master the Car of Tomorrow concept. Franchitti's Sprint Cup Series team funded by Chip Ganassi was disbanded by Ganassi and co-owner Felix Sabates in July 2008 due to the trouble of retaining major sponsorship funding.

Early in 2008, Franchitti entered the season-opening ARCA Re/Max Series race the ARCA 200 at Daytona in CGR's No. 40 Dodge, qualifying ninth and finishing tenth. He qualified CGR's No. 40 Dodge in fourteen races in the renamed Nationwide Series, achieving two top-ten finishes with an average start of 12.6 and an average finish of 17.6. Franchitti's best series finish was a fifth place at the Zippo 200 at the Glen, where he started from pole position. During the Aaron's 312, Franchitti's right-rear tyre failed early in the event, causing a major accident with Larry Gunselman and leaving Franchitti with a minor left-ankle fracture. Franchitti was replaced by Stremme, Ken Schrader, Jeremy Mayfield and Sterling Marlin during his recovery.

=== 2009–2013 ===
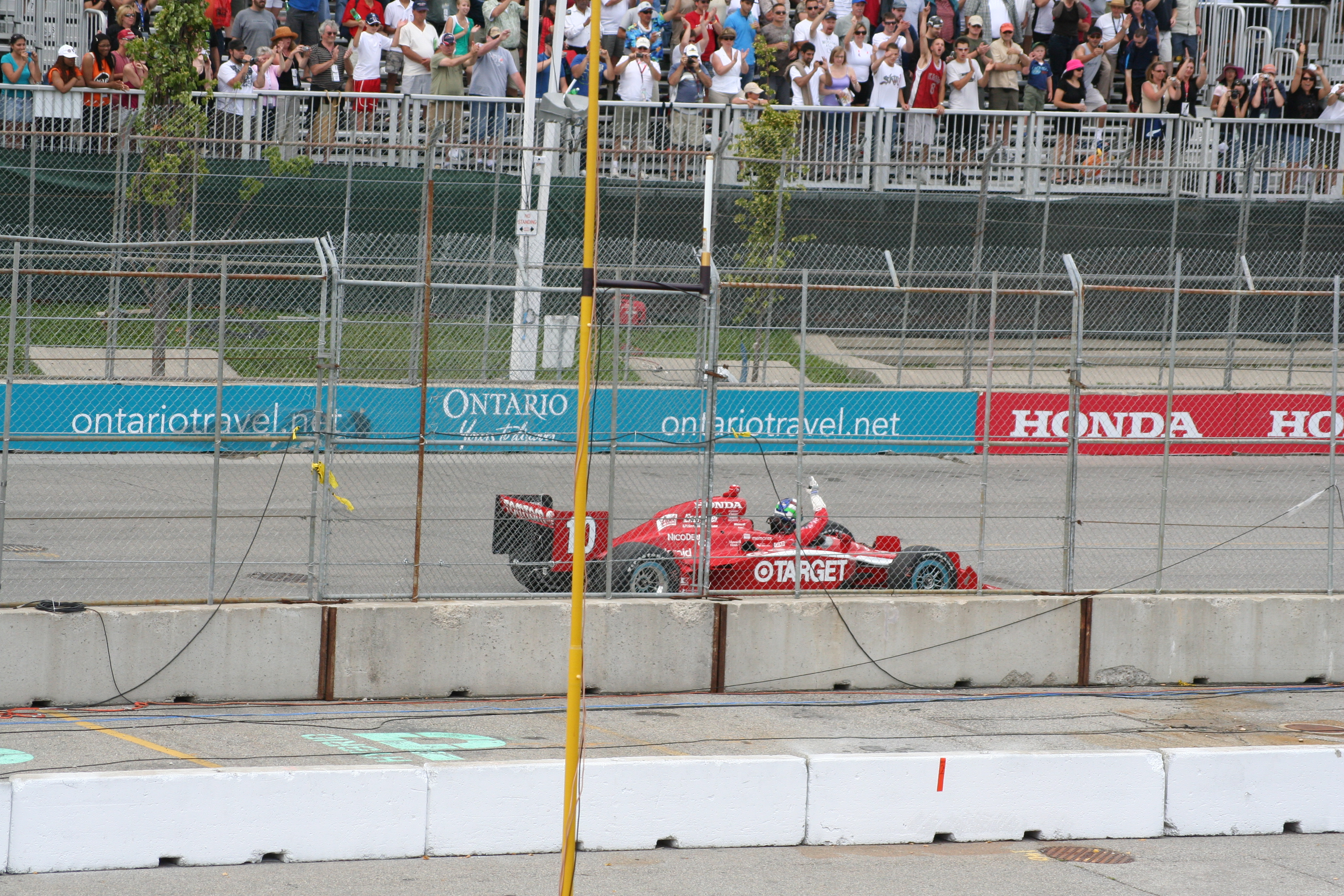
Franchitti celebrating his victory in the 2009 Honda Indy Toronto

Franchitti considered returning to IndyCar while spectating the 2008 Indianapolis 500. The introduction of new road and street circuits (particularly the Grand Prix of Toronto) to the IndyCar Series following the unification of the Champ Car World Series and the IRL sanctioning bodies in 2008 renewed Franchitti's interest in open-wheel racing. Therefore, he signed a multi-year contract with CGR to replace Wheldon starting from the 2009 season. Franchitti wanted to join CGR's No. 41 NASCAR Cup Series team before being reminded of the capability of IndyCars.

After finishing fourth in the season-opening Honda Grand Prix of St. Petersburg, he won the following Toyota Grand Prix of Long Beach after leading with a race-high 51 laps. Franchitti finished seventh and above in the next three races and took pole position for the Bombardier Learjet 550. Franchitti won the Iowa Corn Indy 250, his second victory of 2009. Following his taking pole position for the SunTrust Indy Challenge, Franchitti led the championship after finishing second before exchanging the lead with teammate Dixon over the next four races. Franchitti led 45 laps of the Honda Indy Toronto from pole position to win the race. He had three more top-six finishes before leading the Indy Grand Prix of Sonoma from pole position, winning his fourth race of 2009. Two more top-four finishes put him five points behind Dixon going into the season-ending Firestone Indy 300. Franchitti won the race from pole position, winning his second championship and finishing the year eleven points ahead of Dixon.

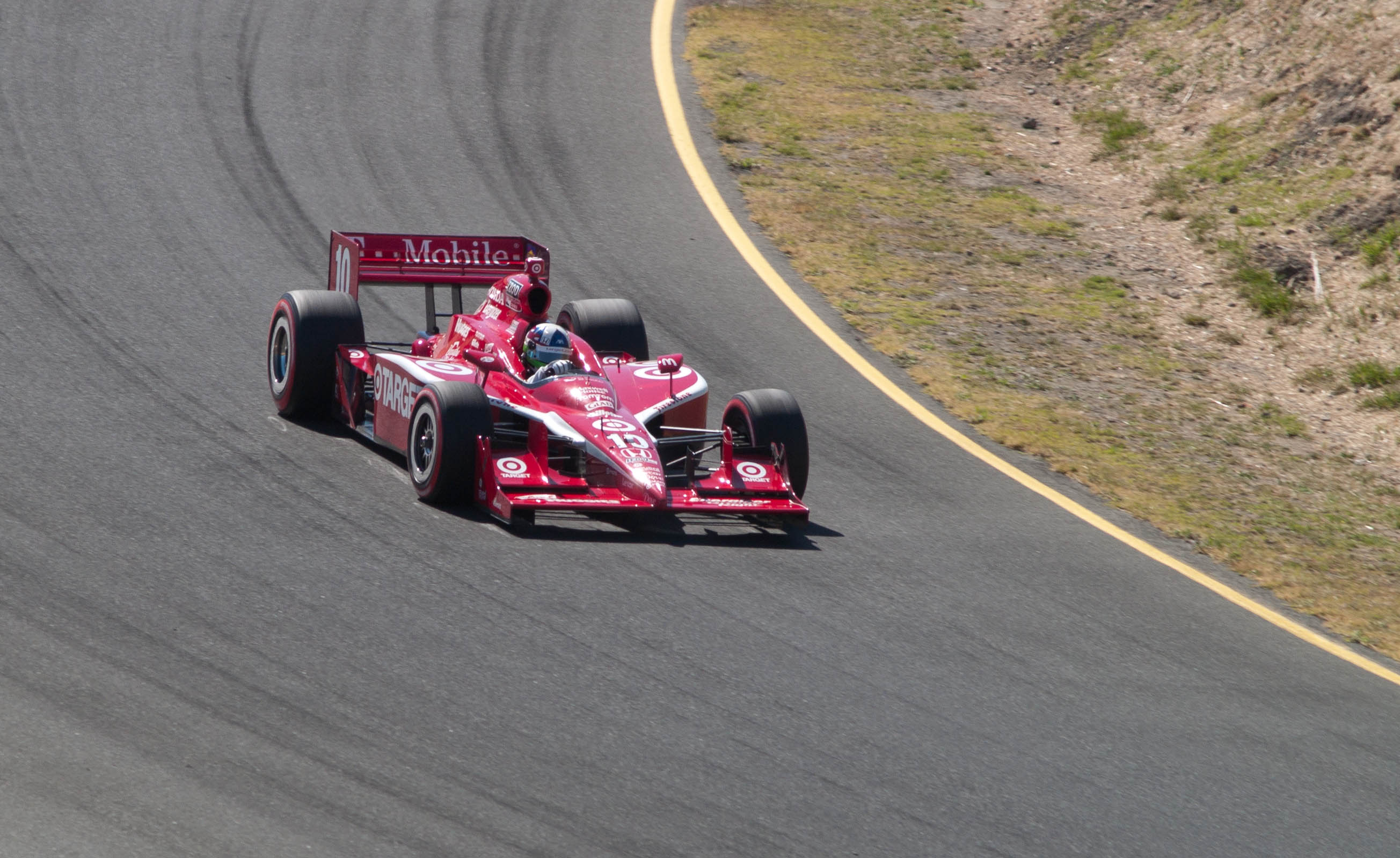
Franchitti during qualifying for the 2010 Indy Grand Prix of Sonoma

In the 2010 season, Franchitti returned to CGR to defend his title. At the season-opening São Paulo Indy 300, he took pole position and finished the rain-interrupted event seventh. He finished third in the Indy Grand Prix of Alabama and second in the RoadRunner Turbo Indy 300. Franchitti qualified third for the Indianapolis 500 and led 155 laps in his second win at the event. Franchitti achieved consecutive podium finishes in the Honda Indy Toronto and the Honda Indy Edmonton in the following five races. He won the Honda Indy 200 and the Peak Antifreeze & Motor Oil Indy 300. A fifth place at Kentucky Speedway and a second place at Motegi put him 12 points behind Penske's Will Power before the season-closing Cafés do Brasil Indy 300 and won the inaugural A. J. Foyt Oval Track Championship with a round to spare. By finishing eighth, Franchitti won his second-consecutive championship and third overall after Power's crash.

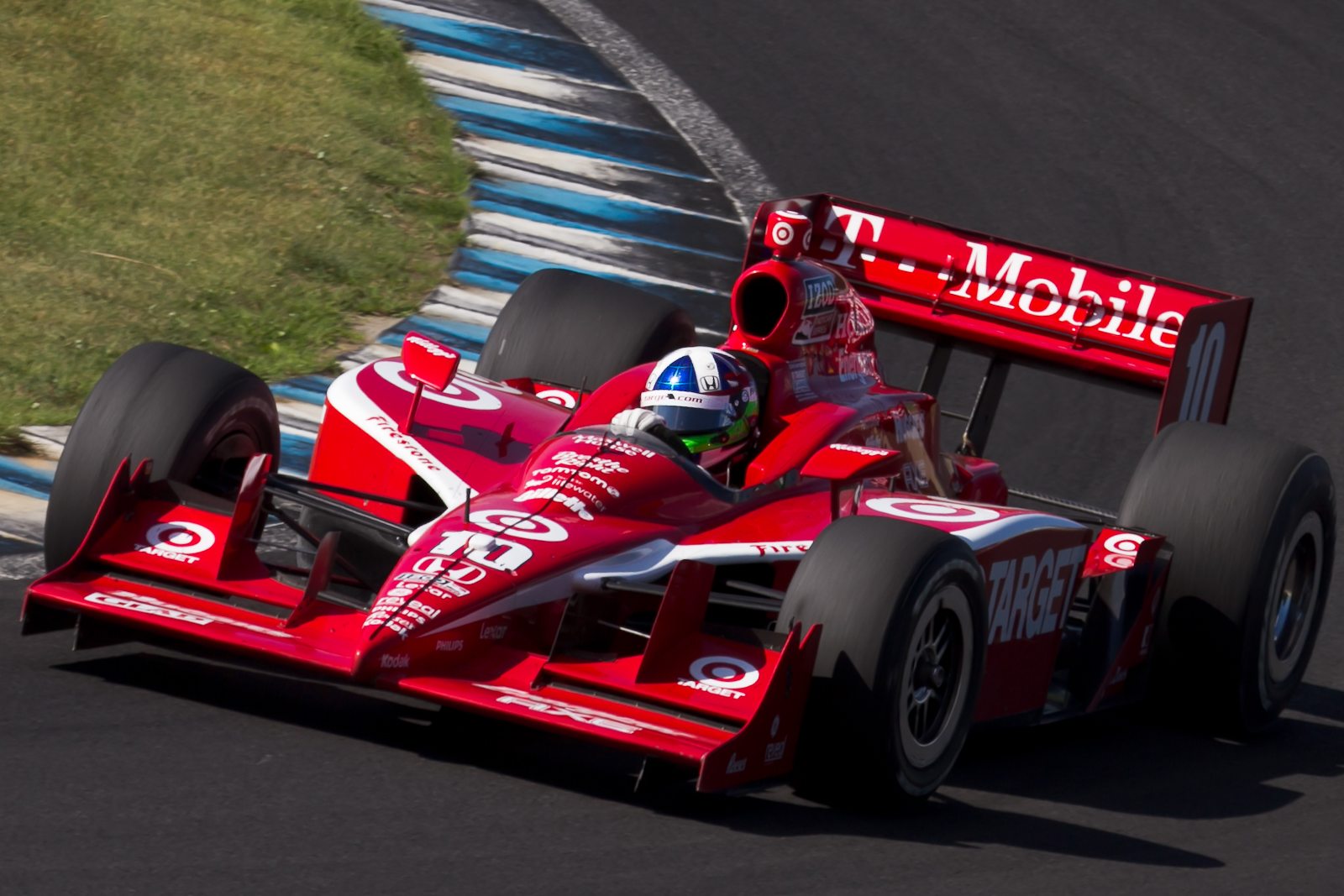
Franchitti competing in the 2011 Indy Japan: The Final

For the 2011 season, Franchitti rejoined CGR for his second successive title defence. At the season-opening Honda Grand Prix of St. Petersburg, Franchitti started fourth and led 94 laps to win the event. He finished third in the Indy Grand Prix of Alabama and the following Toyota Grand Prix of Long Beach, then won the first of the Firestone Twin 275s after leading 110 laps. Franchitti led 161 laps of the Milwaukee 225 from pole position in his third victory of the season, and won the Honda Indy Toronto two races later. The next seven races saw him finish second at Mid-Ohio and Kentucky, third at Edmonton and took another pole position at New Hampshire. Before the season-ending IZOD IndyCar World Championship, Franchitti led Power in the championship standings by 18 points. The race was abandoned following a 15-car accident on the 11th lap that involved Power and caused Wheldon's death, meaning Franchitti won his fourth championship; his third in succession.

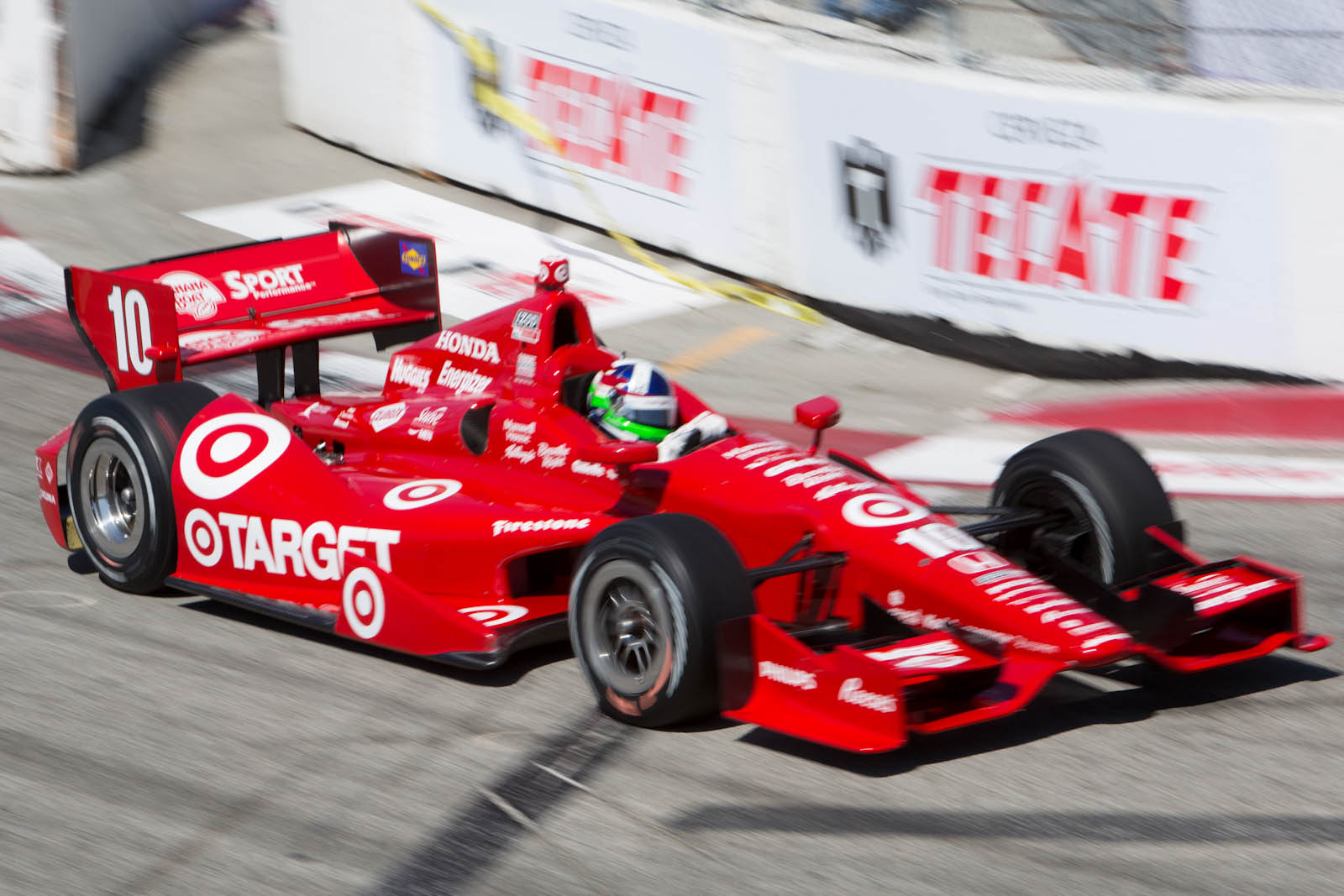
Franchitti at the 2012 Toyota Grand Prix of Long Beach

Franchitti drove for CGR for the 2012 season; he initially struggled to adapt to the new Dallara DW12 car before becoming more competitive following the season's fourth event, which was held in São Paulo, Brazil. Franchitti took two top-ten finishes in the first four races, placing tenth at Barber and fifth in São Paulo. His only win of the season was the Indianapolis 500, which he won for the third time. Franchitti was leading the race on the final lap when Rahal Letterman Lanigan Racing driver Takuma Sato crashed into the barrier in an attempt to overtake Franchitti on the inside into turn one. Franchitti's performance for the rest of the season was sub-par: he had four pole positions that did not result in a race win and three more podium finishes. He was seventh in the Drivers' Championship with 363 points.

Franchitti remained at CGR for the 2013 season. After finishing 25th in both of the season's first two races due to an accident in St. Petersburg and mechanical failure at Barber, respectively, Franchitti qualified on pole position for the Toyota Grand Prix of Long Beach, which he finished fourth. He achieved another ten top-ten finishes and took pole position three more times during the fifteen remaining events in which he participated, earning season-best third-place finishes at each of the Pocono IndyCar 400 races, the first Honda Indy Toronto race, the Honda Indy 200 at Mid-Ohio and the GoPro Indy Grand Prix of Sonoma. Franchitti was tenth in the final championship standings with 418 points.

=== 2026 ===
On 3 February 2026, it was announced that Franchitti would make his return to the NASCAR Craftsman Truck Series, driving Tricon Garage's No. 1 Toyota Tacom for the race at St. Petersburg. He finished the race in 27th.

=== Career-ending accident and mentoring ===
On the final lap of the second race of the 2013 Shell-Pennzoil Grand Prix of Houston doubleheader on 6 October, Franchitti's car collided with the rear of Sato's car in turn five, and was launched into the catchfence. Franchitti's car ripped apart a fence section and sent debris into the grandstand past a second fence ahead of spectators. The car ricocheted back onto the circuit, spinning multiple times before stopping. Franchitti's car settled driver side up on the racing surface; the car's front was removed but the chassis's tub portion remained intact. When E. J. Viso arrived at the crash site, he hit Sato's stationary wrecked car. A recovery crew assisted Sato and Viso as they safely evacuated their cars. An IndyCar official and thirteen spectators were injured; two fans were hospitalised and eleven received on-site treatment.

Franchitti suffered a concussion and two spinal fractures; he was sent to Memorial Hermann–Texas Medical Center, Houston, for surgery to stabilise a fractured right ankle, and was released from hospital on 10 October. Franchitti travelled to Indianapolis for surgery to repair the right talus bone connecting the leg and the foot. On 18 October, Franchitti was released from the Indianapolis hospital. After seeing a doctor in Miami for neurological examinations and a magnetic resonance imaging (MRI) scan that produced negative results, Franchitti travelled to Scotland in November for rest. Franchitti retired from competitive driving after doctors advised him his injuries and those from previous accidents put him at risk of permanent paralysis and brain damage in the event of another major crash. Franchitti's memory, decision-making skills and concentration levels have suffered because of the crash.

Franchitti has worked for CGR as an advisor and driver-coach to each of the team's racers since the 2014 IndyCar Series after he was offered the job by Ganassi. Franchitti provides performance advice to CGR's racers and engineers. He did not want to be a team owner because he believed the financial risks of ownership were too great.

== Other racing ventures ==
In 1999, Franchitti planned to enter the Rally GB held that November but pulled out because of a scheduling conflict. In July 2000, Franchitti took part in a two-day test session for the Jaguar F1 team in its R1 car at Silverstone. He made his endurance racing debut at the 2005 24 Hours of Daytona of the Rolex Sports Car Series, sharing Howard-Boss Motorsports's No. 2 Pontiac Crawford DP03 entry with Milka Duno, Marino Franchitti and Dan Wheldon; they finished 16th in the Daytona Prototype class and 33rd overall after Duno crashed with fewer than six hours left. In 2006, Franchitti again entered 24 Hours of Daytona, this time with CITGO Racing/SAMAX Motorsport in its No. 7 Riley MkXI DP-Pontiac alongside Duno, Marino and Kevin McGarrity, finishing eighth overall after mechanical trouble. Franchitti, Bryan Herta and Tony Kanaan won the Le Mans Prototype 2 (LMP2) category at the 2007 12 Hours of Sebring—part of the American Le Mans Series—and finished second overall in AGR's No. 26 Acura ARX-01 car. Franchitti and Herta then finished sixth in the Toyota Grand Prix of Long Beach.

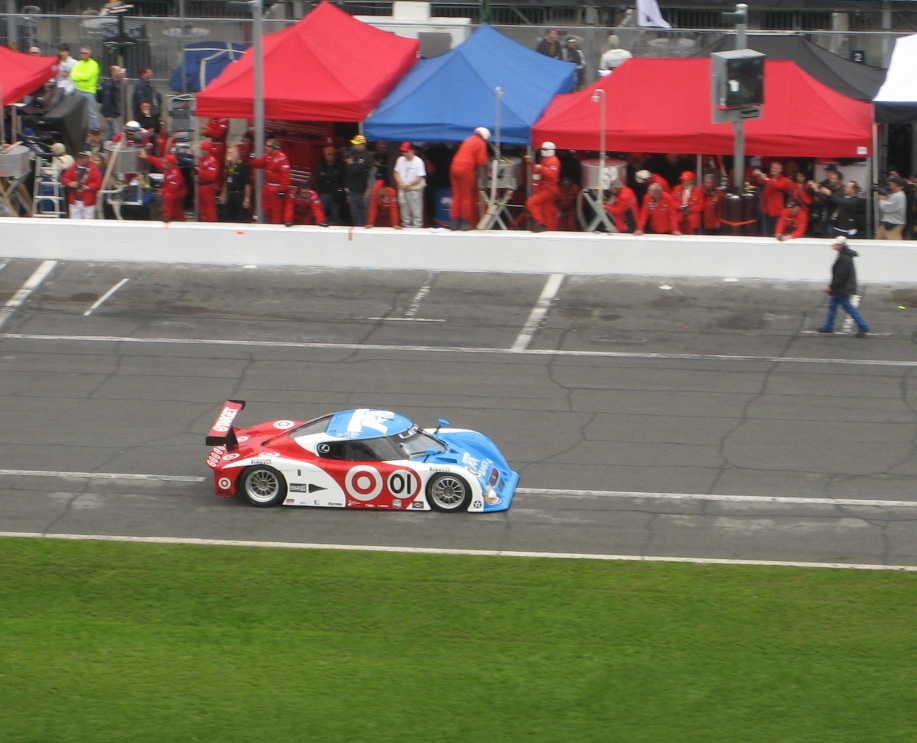
The No. 1 Riley MkXI-Lexus Franchitti shared with Juan Pablo Montoya, Scott Pruett and Memo Rojas to win the 2008 24 Hours of Daytona.

Franchitti won the 2008 24 Hours of Daytona with Juan Pablo Montoya, Scott Pruett and Memo Rojas, completing 695 laps in the No. 01 Chip Ganassi Racing with Felix Sabates (CGRFS) Riley-Lexus car. Franchitti partnered David Brabham and Scott Sharp in Highcroft Racing's No. 9 Acura ARX-01B LMP2 entry at the 2008 Petit Le Mans, retiring after 16 laps when Sharp crashed the car. In 2009, Franchitti, Alex Lloyd and Scott Dixon finished the 24 Hours of Daytona fifth in CGRFS' No. 02 Riley-Lexus vehicle. Franchitti also raced alongside Brabham and Sharp at Highcroft Racing, sharing the No. 9 Acura ARX-02a Le Mans Prototype 1 (LMP1) car for the 12 Hours of Sebring and the Petit Le Mans, retiring with transmission failure at Sebring and finishing sixth at Road Atlanta. In 2010, he entered the 2010 24 Hours of Daytona alongside Dixon, Jamie McMurray and Montoya at CGRFS in a Riley MkXX-BMW vehicle, finishing 37th due to mechanical failure.

Franchitti joined Dick Johnson Racing as Steven Johnson's international co-driver in its No. 17 Ford FG Falcon for the 2010 Armor All Gold Coast 600 double-header round of the V8 Supercar Championship Series. (Note: James Courtney was due to be Franchitti's teammate until Courtney became a championship contender.) Franchitti finished the first race 16th and Johnson crashed in the second. Franchitti returned to the 24 Hours of Daytona in 2011 and 2012 alongside Dixon, McMurray and Montoya at CGRFS, coming second and fourth respectively in the No. 2 Riley-BMW entry. For the 2012 Petit Le Mans, Franchitti joined Marino Franchitti and Scott Tucker as a co-driver of Level 5 Motorsports's No. 055 HPD ARX-03b-Honda LMP2 car, placing third overall and second in their category. At the 2013 24 Hours of Daytona, he, Dixon, Joey Hand and McMurray were 37th overall after McMurray crashed the No. 2 car after a pit stop but Franchitti and Dixon came third in the Continental Tire Sports Car Festival.

Red Bull Racing driver Mark Webber had initiated plans for Franchitti to drive a Porsche 919 Hybrid LMP1 vehicle at the 2015 24 Hours of Le Mans and the 2015 FIA World Endurance Championship upon retiring from IndyCar after 2014, and to race in the all-electric Formula E series. These plans failed to eventuate due to his career-ending injuries in Houston in 2013. (Note: Talks with Prodrive owner David Richards about driving an Aston Martin DBR9 at the 24 Hours of Le Mans did not result in a drive due to IndyCar scheduling conflicts.) Franchitti conducted car demonstrations because he could not compete in any form of racing since he had to avoid further injury but doctors and Motorsport UK medically cleared Franchitti to enter amateur classic car events from 2019. He returned to professional racing at the 2026 Dubai 24 Hour, sharing Team Parker Racing's No. 31 Mercedes-AMG GT3 EVO with Rob Huff, Shaun Lynn and Max Lynn in his GT3 debut. They finished 44th overall.

== Non-racing ventures and personal life ==
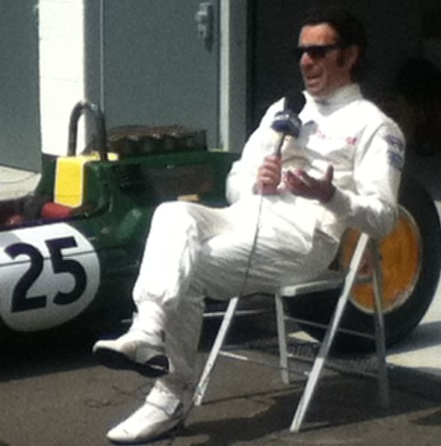
Franchitti in the pit lane of the Silverstone Circuit at the 2014 British Grand Prix.

Franchitti has endorsed the Dutch watch brand TW Steel since 2010. Franchitti volunteered for the charity Bethany Christian Trust in Edinburgh as a van driver to deliver food and drink to homeless people, and for the charity Mission Motorsport, which supports the rehabilitation and employment of former military personnel, frequently through sport. He has appeared on the American television shows Late Show with David Letterman and The Late Late Show with Craig Ferguson.

Franchitti made a cameo appearance as a racing driver in the 2001 film Driven. He also voiced a Scottish news anchor and a male tourist in the 2013 animated film Turbo, for which he provided technical consultation. He has served as a television co-commentator and driver pundit on Formula E's world feed since its inaugural season in 2014. In 2019, Franchitti and Take That band member Howard Donald co-presented the four-part Channel 4 television motoring series Mission Ignition. He has also worked in development for high-performance car manufacturers Acura and Gordon Murray Automotive.

Franchitti is a member of the "Brat Pack", an international group of CART drivers composed of Kanaan, Greg Moore and Max Papis, who shared a desire for enjoyment, attending all-night parties, discussing life and staying in close contact with one another. (Note: "The Brat Pack" name was derived from the Frank Sinatra-led Rat Pack group of entertainers who enlivened the 1950 and 1960's Hollywood party scene.) Moore introduced Franchitti to actress Ashley Judd at Jason Priestley's wedding in February 1999. Judd and Franchitti became engaged that year and married on 12 December 2001 at Skibo Castle near Dornoch, Scotland. The marriage was childless; Franchitti and Judd divorced in 2013 and remain on friendly terms. He has since married hedge-fund executive Eleanor Robb; the couple have two children.

== Awards and recognition ==
Dario Franchitti received the Autosport British Club Driver of the Year in 1993, and the Autosport British Competition Driver of the Year in 1998 and 2010. In 2001, he won the Greg Moore Legacy Award as "the driver who best typifies Moore's legacy of outstanding talent on track as well as displaying a dynamic personality with fans, media and within the CART community". Six years later, Franchitti received the BBC Scotland Sports Personality of the Year, the Gregor Grant Award, the Jackie Stewart Medal and the Callands Trophy.

Franchitti was one of two winners of the BRDC Gold Star in 2009. Since 2011, the Scottish National Gallery has held a 2010 photographic portrait of Franchitti taken by David Livshin. Franchitti was appointed Member of the Order of the British Empire (MBE) in the 2014 Birthday Honours "for services to motor racing". Franchitti was elected to the Long Beach Motorsports Walk of Fame in 2014; the Indianapolis Motor Speedway Hall of Fame in 2017, the Open Wheel category of the Motorsports Hall of Fame of America in 2019; the Scottish Sports Hall of Fame in 2022; and was the 2023 International Category inductee of the Canadian Motorsport Hall of Fame.

== Motorsports career results ==
=== Junior career ===
==== British Formula Three Championship ====
(key) (Races in bold indicate pole position) (Races in italics indicate fastest lap)

British Formula Three Championship results
Year	Team	Chassis	Engine	Class	1	2	3	4	5	6	7	8	9	10	11	12	13	14	15	16	17	18	Pos.	Pts
1993	Paul Stewart Racing	Reynard 933	Mugen-Honda	A	SIL	THR	BRH	DON	BRH	SIL	OUL	DON	SIL	DON	SNE	PEM	SIL; 5	SIL	THR				16th	2
1994	Paul Stewart Racing	Dallara F394	Mugen-Honda	A	**SIL**; 1	DON; 3	BRH; Ret	BRH; Ret	SIL; Ret	SIL; 10	BRH; 2	THR; 2	OUL; 13	DON; 3	SIL; 6	SNE; 10	PEM; 3	PEM; 2	SIL; 14	SIL; 8	THR; 5	SIL; 4	4th	133

=== Touring car racing ===
==== Deutsche Tourenwagen Meisterschaft ====
(key) (Races in bold indicate pole position) (Races in italics indicate fastest lap)

Deutsche Tourenwagen Meisterschaft results
Year	Team	Car	1	2	3	4	5	6	7	8	9	10	11	12	13	14	Pos.	Pts
1995	D2 Privat-Team AMG Mercedes	Mercedes C-Class V6	HOC; 1; 3	HOC; 2 DNS	AVU; 1 Ret	AVU; 2 Ret	NOR; 1; 6	NOR; 2; 2	DIE; 1; 2	DIE; 2; 4	NÜR; 1 Ret	NÜR; 2 Ret	**ALE**; **1**; 2	ALE; 2; 10	**HOC**; **1** Ret	HOC; 2 DNS	5th	74

==== International Touring Car Championship ====
(key) (Races in bold indicate pole position) (Races in italics indicate fastest lap)

International Touring Car Championship results
Year	Team	Car	1	2	3	4	5	6	7	8	9	10	11	12	13	14	15	16	17	18	19	20	21	22	23	24	25	26	Pos.	Pts
1995	D2 Privat-Team AMG Mercedes	Mercedes C-Class V6	MUG; 1; 4	MUG; 2; 1	HEL; 1; 12†	HEL; 2 DNS	DON; 1; 2	DON; 2; 2	EST; 1; 5	EST; 2; 3	MAG; 1 Ret	MAG; 2 DNS																	3rd	80
1996	D2 Privat-Team AMG Mercedes	Mercedes C-Class V6	HOC; 1; 3	HOC; 2; 4	NÜR; 1; 2	NÜR; 2; 8	EST; 1; 9	EST; 2; 10	HEL; 1; 17†	HEL; 2 DNS	NOR; 1; 5	NOR; 2 Ret	DIE; 1; 2	DIE; 2; 2	SIL; 1; 21†	SIL; 2; 14	NÜR; 1; 3	NÜR; 2; 3	MAG; 1; 6	MAG; 2; 4	MUG; 1; 4	MUG; 2; 2	HOC; 1 Ret	HOC; 2; 7	INT; 1; 13	INT; 2; 10	SUZ; 1; 1	**SUZ**; **2** Ret	4th	171
Sources:

- † – Retired, but was classified as he completed 90% of the winner's race distance.

==== International V8 Supercar results ====
(key) (Races in bold indicate pole position) (Races in italics indicate fastest lap)

V8 Supercar results
Year	Team	Car	1	2	3	4	5	6	7	8	9	10	11	12	13	14	15	16	17	18	19	20	21	22	23	24	25	26	27	Pos.	Pts
2010	Dick Johnson Racing	Ford FG Falcon	YMC; R1	YMC; R2	BHR; R3	BHR; R4	ADE; R5	ADE; R6	HAM; R7	HAM; R8	QLD; R9	QLD; R10	WIN; R11	WIN; R12	HDV; R13	HDV; R14	TOW; R15	TOW; R16	PHI; Q	PHI; R17	BAT; R18	SUR; R19; 16	SUR; R20; Ret	SYM; R21	SYM; R22	SAN; R23	SAN; R24	SYD; R25	SYD; R26	NC	0

=== American open–wheel racing results ===
(key)

==== CART ====
CART Championship Series results
Year	Team	No.	Chassis	Engine	1	2	3	4	5	6	7	8	9	10	11	12	13	14	15	16	17	18	19	20	21	Rank	Points	Ref
1997	Hogan Racing	9	Reynard 97I	Mercedes-Benz IC108D V8 t	MIA; 25	SRF; 9	LBH; 12	NZR; 13	RIO; 27	STL; 17	MIL; 16	DET; 13	POR; 26	CLE; 11	**TOR**; 26	MIS; 19	MOH; 11	ROA; 25	VAN; 13	LS; 13	FON					22nd	10	
1998	Team Green	27	Reynard 98I	Honda HRK V8 t	MIA; 9	MOT; 8	LBH; 2	NZR; 21	**RIO**; 19	STL; 27	MIL; 4	DET; 4	POR; 21	CLE; 3	**TOR**; 20*	MIS; 21	**MOH**; 26	ROA; 1*	**VAN**; 1*	LS; 4	HOU; 1*	**SRF**; 2	FON; 22			3rd	160	
1999	Team Green	27	Reynard 99I	Honda HRS V8 t	MIA; 3	MOT; 22	LBH; 2	NZR; 8	RIO; 2	STL; 3	MIL; 7	POR; 3	CLE; 25	ROA; 18	TOR; 1*	MIS; 5	DET; 1	**MOH**; 3*	CHI; 2	VAN; 10	LS; 25	HOU; 2	**SRF**; 1*	FON; 10		2nd*	212*	
2000	Team Green	27	Reynard 2KI	Honda HR-0 V8 t	MIA; 11	LBH; 23	RIO; 11	MOT; 2	NZR; 23	MIL; 6	DET; 4	POR; 9	CLE; 13	TOR; 25	MIS; 3	CHI; 20	MOH; 22	**ROA**; 12	**VAN**; 2*	LS; 3	STL; 24	HOU; 25	SRF; 25	FON; 23		13th	92	
2001	Team Green	27	Reynard 01I	Honda HR-1 V8 t	MTY; 9	LBH; 6	TXS; NH	NZR; 8	MOT; 17	MIL; 9	DET; 2	POR; 6	CLE; 1	TOR; 24	MIS; 2	CHI; 15	MOH; 16	ROA; 19	VAN; 9	LAU; 25	ROC; 9	HOU; 2	LS; 19	SRF; 23	FON; 23	7th	105	
2002	Team Green	27	Reynard 02I	Honda HR-2 V8 t	MTY; 2	LBH; 9	MOT; 3																			4th	148	
2002	Team Green	27	Lola B02/00	Honda HR-2 V8 t				MIL; 12	LS; 19	POR; 3	**CHI**; **3**	TOR; 13	CLE; 14	VAN; 1	MOH; 17	ROA; 12	MTL; 1*	DEN; 18	ROC; 1	MIA; 10	SRF; 7	FON; 10	MXC; 5			4th	148	

* Franchitti lost the title on the tiebreaker—he won only three races compared to Juan Pablo Montoya's seven after both tied on 212 points.

==== IndyCar Series ====
IndyCar Series results
Year	Team	No.	Chassis	Engine	1	2	3	4	5	6	7	8	9	10	11	12	13	14	15	16	17	18	19	Rank	Points	Ref
2002	Team Green	27	Dallara IR-02	Chevrolet	HMS	PHX	FON	NZR	INDY; 19	TXS	PPIR	RIR	KAN	NSH	MIS	KTY	STL	CHI	TX2					44th	11	
2003	Andretti Green Racing	27	Dallara IR-03	Honda	HMS; 7	PHX; 16	MOT	INDY	TXS	PPIR; 4	RIR	KAN	NSH	MIS	STL	KTY	NZR	CHI	FON	TX2				25th	72	
2004	Andretti Green Racing	27	Dallara IR-03	Honda	HMS; 17	PHX; 17	MOT; 7	INDY; 14	**TXS**; 2	RIR; 12	KAN; 4	NSH; 20	MIL; 1	MIS; 22	KTY; 6	PPIR; 1	NZR; 3	CHI; 20	FON; 6	TX2; 15				6th	409	
2005	Andretti Green Racing	27	Dallara IR-05	Honda	HMS; 22	PHX; 4	STP; 3	MOT; 17	INDY; 6	TXS; 8	RIR; 2	KAN; 4	NSH; 1	MIL; 2	MIS; 8	KTY; 18	PPIR; 7	SNM; 8	CHI; 12	WGL; 3	**FON**; 1			4th	498	
2006	Andretti Green Racing	27	Dallara IR-05	Honda	HMS; 4	**STP**; 19	MOT; 11	INDY; 7	WGL; 14	TXS; 13	RIR; 3	KAN; 12	NSH; 6	MIL; 6	MIS; 12	KTY; 9	SNM; 2	CHI						8th	311	
2007	Andretti Green Racing	27	Dallara IR-05	Honda	HMS; 7	STP; 5	MOT; 3	KAN; 2	INDY; 1	MIL; 2	TXS; 4	IOW; 1	**RIR**; 1	WGL; 3	NSH; 2	MOH; 2	**MIS**; 13	KTY; 8	**SNM**; 3	DET; 6	**CHI**; 1			1st	637	
2008	Chip Ganassi Racing	10	Dallara IR-05	Honda	HMS	STP	MOT	LBH	KAN	INDY	MIL	TXS	IOW	RIR	WGL	NSH	MOH	EDM	KTY	SNM	DET	CHI	SRF^{1} 16	NC	-	
2009	Chip Ganassi Racing	10	Dallara IR-05	Honda	STP; 4	LBH; 1	KAN; 18	INDY; 7	MIL; 3	**TXS**; 5	IOW; 1	**RIR**; 2	WGL; 15	**TOR**; 1	EDM; 5	KTY; 6	MOH; 3	**SNM**; 1	CHI; 4	MOT; 2	**HMS**; 1			1st	616	
2010	Chip Ganassi Racing	10	Dallara IR-05	Honda	**SAO**; 7	STP; 5	ALA; 3	LBH; 12	KAN; 2	INDY; 1	TXS; 5	IOW; 18	WGL; 3	TOR; 2	EDM; 3	MOH; 1	SNM; 3	CHI; 1	KTY; 5	MOT; 2	**HMS**; 8			1st	602	
2011	Chip Ganassi Racing	10	Dallara IR-05	Honda	STP; 1	ALA; 3	LBH; 3	SAO; 4	INDY; 12	TXS1; 1	TXS2; 7	**MIL**; 1	IOW; 5	TOR; 1	EDM; 3	MOH; 2	**NHM**; 20	SNM; 4	BAL; 4	MOT; 8	KTY; 2	LVS^{2} C		1st	573	
2012	Chip Ganassi Racing	10	Dallara DW12	Honda	STP; 13	ALA; 10	LBH; 15	SAO; 5		DET; 2	TXS; 14	**MIL**; 19	**IOW**; 25	**TOR**; 17	EDM; 6	MOH; 17	SNM; 3	BAL; 13	FON; 2					7th	363	
2012	Chip Ganassi Racing	50	Dallara DW12	Honda					INDY; 1															7th	363	
2013	Chip Ganassi Racing	10	Dallara DW12	Honda	STP; 25	ALA; 25	**LBH**; 4	SAO; 7	INDY; 23	**DET**; 6	DET; 5	TXS; 6	MIL; 8	IOW; 20	POC; 3	**TOR**; 3	TOR; 4	MOH; 3	**SNM**; 3	BAL; 21	HOU; 15	HOU; 15	FON	10th	418	

Years	Teams	Races	Poles	Wins	Podiums (Non-win)**	Top 10s (Non-podium)***	Indianapolis 500 wins	Championships
11	2	151	23	21	38	50	3 (2007, 2010 & 2012)	4 (2007, 2009, 2010 & 2011)

** Podium (Non-win) indicates second or third place finishes.
*** Top 10s (Non-podium) indicates fourth through tenth place finishes.

==== Indianapolis 500 ====
Franchitti en route to winning the 2007 Indianapolis 500

Year	Chassis	Engine	Start	Finish	Team
2002	Dallara	Chevrolet	28	19	Team Green
2003	Dallara	Honda	DNP^{3}		Andretti Green
2004	Dallara	Honda	3	14	Andretti Green
2005	Dallara	Honda	6	6	Andretti Green
2006	Dallara	Honda	17	7	Andretti Green
2007	Dallara	Honda	3	**1**	Andretti Green
2009	Dallara	Honda	3	7	Chip Ganassi Racing
2010	Dallara	Honda	3	**1**	Chip Ganassi Racing
2011	Dallara	Honda	9	12	Chip Ganassi Racing
2012	Dallara	Honda	16	**1**	Chip Ganassi Racing
2013	Dallara	Honda	17	23	Chip Ganassi Racing

^{1} Non-points-paying, exhibition race.
^{2} Cancelled due to death of Dan Wheldon.
^{3} Sat out of race due to injury

=== Sports car racing ===
==== Rolex Sports Car Series results ====
(key) (Races in bold indicate pole position, Results are overall/class)

Rolex Sports Car Series results
Year	Team	Make	Class	1	2	3	4	5	6	7	8	9	10	11	12	13	14	15	Points
2005	Howard-Boss Motorsports	Pontiac	DP	DAY; **33/16**	HOM	CAL	LAG	CMT	WAT1	BAR	WAT2	DAY2	MOH	PHX	WAT3	VIR	MEX		15
2006	CITGO Racing/SAMAX Motorsport	Riley	DP	DAY; **8 / 8**	MEX	HOM	LBH	VIR	LAG	PHX	LRP	WAT1	DAY2	BAR	WAT2	INF	MIL		23
2008	Chip Ganassi Racing	Riley	DP	DAY; **1 / 1**	HOM	MEX	VIR	LAG	LRP	WAT	MOH	DAY2	BAR	CGV	WAT2	INF	NJ	MIL	35
2009	Chip Ganassi Racing	Riley	DP	DAY; **5 / 5**	VIR	NJ	LAG	WAT	MOH	DAY2	BAR	WAT2	CGV	MIL	HOM				26
2010	Chip Ganassi Racing	Riley	DP	DAY; **37/15**	HOM	BAR	VIR	LRP	LAG	WAT1	MOH	DAY2	NJ	WAT2	CGV	MIL			16
2011	Chip Ganassi Racing	Riley	DP	DAY; **2/2**	HOM	BAR	VIR	LRP	LAG	WAT1	MOH	DAY2	NJ	WAT2	CGV	MIL			32
2012	Chip Ganassi Racing	Riley	DP	DAY; **4 / 4**	BAR	HMS	NJ	DET	MOH	RA	WAT1	IMS	WAT2	CGV	LAG	LRP			28
2013	Chip Ganassi Racing	Riley	DP	DAY; **37/11**	AUS	BAR	ATL	DET	MOH	S6H	IMS	RA	KAN	LAG; **3/3**	LRP				20

==== American Le Mans Series results ====
(key) (Races in bold indicate pole position, Results are overall/class)

American Le Mans Series results
Year	Team	Make	Class	1	2	3	4	5	6	7	8	9	10	11	12	Points
2007	Andretti Green Racing	Acura	LMP2	**SEB**; **2 / 1**	STP	**LBH**; **6 / 6**	LS	UTH	NEG	MOH	RA	MOS	DSC	PLM	MSC	32
2008	Highcroft Racing	Acura	LMP2	SEB	STP	LBH	UTH	NEG	MOH	RA	MOS	DSC	PLM; Ret	MSC		0
2009	Highcroft Racing	Acura	LMP1	SEB; Ret	STP	LBH	UTH	NEG	MOH	RA	MOS	PLM; 6 / 6	MSC			34
2012	Level 5 Motorsports	HPD	LMP2	SEB	LBH	MTY	LRP	MOS	MOH	ROA	BAL	VIR	PET; 3/1			20

=== NASCAR ===
(key) (Bold – Pole position awarded by qualifying time. Italics – Pole position earned by points standings or practice time. * – Most laps led.)

==== Sprint Cup Series ====
NASCAR Sprint Cup Series results
Year	Team	No.	Make	1	2	3	4	5	6	7	8	9	10	11	12	13	14	15	16	17	18	19	20	21	22	23	24	25	26	27	28	29	30	31	32	33	34	35	36	NSCC	Pts	Ref(s)
2008	Chip Ganassi Racing	40	Dodge	DAY; 33	CAL; 32	LVS; 33	ATL; 33	BRI; 36	MAR; 22	TEX; DNQ	PHO; 32	TAL; INQ^{†}	RCH	DAR	CLT	DOV	POC; 41	MCH; 43	SON; DNQ	NHA; 38	DAY	CHI	IND	POC	GLN	MCH	BRI	CAL	RCH	NHA	DOV	KAN	TAL	CLT	MAR	ATL	TEX	PHO	HOM	49th	606	
^{†} – Qualified but replaced by David Stremme

===== Daytona 500 =====
Year	Team	Manufacturer	Start	Finish
2008	Chip Ganassi Racing	Dodge	40	33

==== Nationwide Series ====
NASCAR Nationwide Series results
Year	Team	No.	Make	1	2	3	4	5	6	7	8	9	10	11	12	13	14	15	16	17	18	19	20	21	22	23	24	25	26	27	28	29	30	31	32	33	34	35	NNSC	Pts	Ref(s)
2007	Chip Ganassi Racing	42	Dodge	DAY	CAL	MXC	LVS	ATL	BRI	NSH	TEX	PHO	TAL	RCH	DAR	CLT	DOV	NSH	KEN	MLW	NHA	DAY	CHI	GTY	IRP	CGV	GLN	MCH	BRI	CAL	RCH	DOV	KAN	CLT	MEM; 32	TEX; 25	PHO; 29	HOM; 39	95th	277	
2008	Chip Ganassi Racing	40	Dodge	DAY; 20	CAL; 24	LVS; 6	ATL; 28	BRI; 22	NSH	TEX; 11	PHO; 11	MXC	TAL; 41	RCH	DAR	CLT	DOV; 15	NSH	KEN	MLW	NHA; 13	DAY	CHI; 26	GTY	IRP	CGV	**GLN**; 5	MCH; 13	BRI; 11	CAL	RCH	DOV	KAN	CLT	MEM	TEX	PHO	HOM	35th	1571	

==== Craftsman Truck Series ====
NASCAR Craftsman Truck Series results
Year	Team	No.	Make	1	2	3	4	5	6	7	8	9	10	11	12	13	14	15	16	17	18	19	20	21	22	23	24	25	NCTC	Pts	Ref
2007	Cunningham Motorsports	41	Dodge	DAY	CAL	ATL	MAR	KAN	CLT	MFD	DOV	TEX	MCH	MLW	MEM	KEN	IRP	NSH	BRI	GTW	NHA	LVS	TAL	MAR; 33	ATL	TEX	PHO	HOM	107th	64	
2026	Tricon Garage	1	Toyota	DAY	ATL	STP; 27	DAR	CAR	BRI	TEX	GLN	DOV	CLT	NSH	MCH	COR	LRP	NWS	IRP	RCH	NHA	BRI	KAN	CLT	PHO	TAL	MAR	HOM	72nd	18	

=== ARCA Re/Max Series ===
(key) (Bold – Pole position awarded by qualifying time. Italics – Pole position earned by points standings or practice time. * – Most laps led.)

ARCA Re/Max Series results
Year	Team	No.	Make	1	2	3	4	5	6	7	8	9	10	11	12	13	14	15	16	17	18	19	20	21	22	23	ARSC	Pts	Ref
2007	Chip Ganassi Racing	42	Dodge	DAY	USA	NSH	SLM	KAN	WIN	KEN	TOL	IOW	POC	MCH	BLN	KEN	POC	NSH	ISF	MIL	GTW	DSF	CHI	SLM	TAL; 17	TOL	135th	145	
2008	Chip Ganassi Racing	40	Dodge	DAY; 10	SLM	IOW	KEN	CAR	KEN	TOL	POC	MCH	CAY	KEN	BLN	POC	NSH	ISF	DSF	CHI	SLM	NJE	TAL	TOL			102nd	180	

== Bibliography ==
- Girard, Greg; Lambot, Ian; Newsome, Philip (1998). Macau Grand Prix: The Road to Success. Haslemere, Surrey: Watermark Publications. ISBN 1-873-200-21-8 – via Internet Archive.
- Lewis, Wendy; Lewis, Simon (2000). Formula One Testing: Grand Prix Action Between Races. Lydney, England: Simon Lewis Transport Books. ISBN 1-903728-00-2 – via Internet Archive.
- Willis, John (2002). Monush, Barry (ed.). Screen World. Vol. 53. New York City, United States: Applause Theatre & Cinema Books. ISBN 1-55783-598-5 – via Internet Archive.
- MacAskill, Kenny; McLeish, Henry (2005). "Dario Franchitti: Indy Racing Driver, Nashville". Global Scots: Voices from Afar. Edinburgh, Scotland: Luath Book Press. ISBN 978-1-905222-37-7 – via Internet Archive.
- Drysdale, Neil (2008). Dario Speedwagon: Rise of the Champion. Edinburgh, Scotland: Birlinn. ISBN 978-1-84158-763-9 – via Internet Archive.
- Taylor, Simon (2013). "Dario Franchitti: From Scottish export to American hero". Motor Sport Greats: In Conservation. Sparkford, England: Haynes Publishing. ISBN 978-0-85733-250-9 – via Internet Archive.

Sporting positions
Preceded by Sam Hornish Jr. Scott Dixon	IRL IndyCar Series Champion; 2007; 2009, 2010, 2011	Succeeded by Scott Dixon; Ryan Hunter-Reay
Achievements
Preceded by Sam Hornish Jr. Hélio Castroneves; Dan Wheldon	Indianapolis 500 Winner; 2007; 2010; 2012	Succeeded by Scott Dixon; Dan Wheldon; Tony Kanaan
Awards
Preceded by Oliver Gavin	McLaren Autosport BRDC Award; 1992	Succeeded by Ralph Firman
Preceded by Oliver Gavin	Autosport; British Club Driver of the Year; 1993	Succeeded by James Matthews
Preceded by Mark Blundell	Autosport; British Competition Driver of the Year; 1998	Succeeded by Eddie Irvine
Preceded by Jenson Button	Autosport; British Competition Driver of the Year; 2010	Succeeded by Jenson Button
