= Reynard 2KI =

Racing car designed and built by Reynard Racing Cars

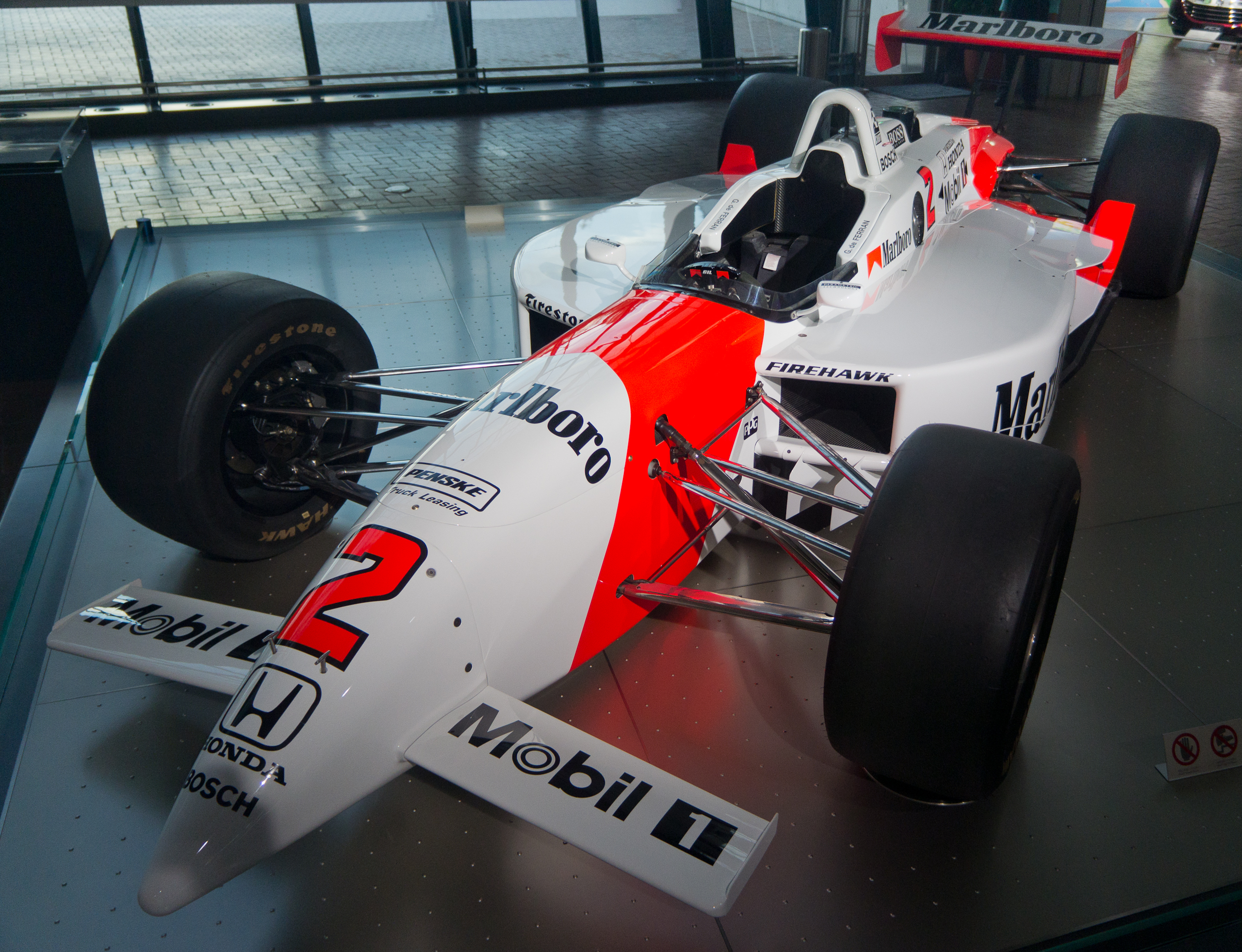
- Category: CART IndyCar
- Constructor: Reynard Racing Cars
- Predecessor: Reynard 99I
- Successor: Reynard 01I

Technical specifications
- Length: 190 in (4,826 mm)
- Width: 78–80 in (1,981–2,032 mm)
- Height: 37 in (940 mm)
- Axle track: 68 in (1,727 mm) (Front); 68 in (1,727 mm) (Rear)
- Wheelbase: 116 in (2,946 mm)
- Engine: Honda Indy V8 turbo Mercedes-Benz IC108; Toyota RV8E; Ford-Cosworth XD 2.65 L (2,650 cc; 162 cu in) V8 mid-engined
- Transmission: 6-speed sequential manual
- Weight: 1,550 lb (700 kg)
- Fuel: Methanol
- Tyres: Firestone Firehawk

Competition history
- Debut: 2000 Marlboro Grand Prix of Miami; Miami, Florida
Wins
13
- Teams' Championships: 1
- Constructors' Championships: 1
- Drivers' Championships: 1

The Reynard 2KI is an open-wheel racing car chassis designed and built by Reynard Racing Cars that competed in the 2000 IndyCar season. It was extremely competitive and dominant, winning 13 out of the 20 races that season, including the season-opener at Miami. It later won both the constructors' and drivers' titles later that year, being driven by Gil de Ferran.
