= Reynard 99I =

Racing car designed and built by Reynard Racing Cars

- Category: CART IndyCar
- Constructor: Reynard Racing Cars
- Predecessor: Reynard 98I
- Successor: Reynard 2KI

Technical specifications
- Length: 190 in (4,826 mm)
- Width: 78–80 in (1,981–2,032 mm)
- Height: 37 in (940 mm)
- Axle track: 68 in (1,727 mm) (Front); 68 in (1,727 mm) (Rear)
- Wheelbase: 116 in (2,946 mm)
- Engine: Honda Indy V8 turbo Mercedes-Benz IC108; Toyota RV8D; Ford/Cosworth XD 2.65 L (2,650 cc; 162 cu in) V8 mid-engined
- Transmission: 6-speed sequential manual
- Weight: 1,550 lb (700 kg)
- Fuel: Methanol
- Tyres: Firestone Firehawk; Goodyear Eagle

Competition history
- Debut: 1999 Marlboro Grand Prix of Miami; Miami, Florida

The Reynard 99I is an open-wheel racing car designed and built by Reynard Racing Cars that competed in the 1999 IndyCar season. It was extremely dominant winning 18 out of the 20 races that season, including the season-opener at Miami. It later won both the constructors' and drivers' titles later that year, being driven by Juan Pablo Montoya.
