= 2012 F1600 Championship Series =

2012 F1600 Championship season

Seasons
- ← 2011 2013 →

The 2012 F1600 Championship Series season was the second season of the F1600 Championship Series. Matias Köykkä won the championship in the last race of the season.

== Drivers and teams ==
Team	No.	Driver	Car	Engine	Notes
(United States) Andy LLC	86	(United States) Kevin Brumbaugh	Crosslé 35F	Honda Fit	
(United States) Andy LLC	86	(United States) Andy Brumbaugh	Crosslé 35F	Honda Fit	
(United States) Dotworks Racing	01	(United States) John McCusker	Van Diemen RF01	Honda Fit	
(United States) Bryan Herta Autosport	98	(United States) Brandon Newey	Mygale SJ12	Honda Fit	
(United States) Bryan Herta Autosport	97	(Canada) Garett Grist	Mygale SJ12	Honda Fit	
(United States) Bryan Herta Autosport	97	(United States) Adrian Starrantino	Mygale SJ12	Honda Fit	
(United States) Quantum Racing Services	17	(Brazil) Roberto Lorena	Van Diemen RF98	Honda Fit	
(United States) Quantum Racing Services	7	(Japan) Haruaki Tanaka	Van Diemen RF98	Honda Fit	Summit Point only
(Canada) BGR Team Grote	6	(Canada) Jesse Lazare	Piper DF5	Honda Fit	
(United States) Cape Motorsports w/ Wayne Taylor Racing	10	(Finland) Matias Köykkä	Spectrum 011	Honda Fit	
(United States) Cape Motorsports w/ Wayne Taylor Racing	9	(Australia) Shae Davies	Spectrum 011	Honda Fit	
(United States) Cape Motorsports w/ Wayne Taylor Racing	9	(United States) Neil Alberico	Spectrum 011	Honda Fit	
(United States) Ski Motorsports	12	(United States) Jeremy Grenier	Citation 95FF	Honda Fit	
(United States) DBM Racing	72	(United States) Stephen Oseth	Citation	Honda Fit	
(United States) Art Foster Racing	21	(United States) Arthur Foster	Van Diemen RF00	Ford Kent	
(United States) TTO Motorsports	5	(United States) Colin Thompson	Swift DB6	Honda Fit	
(United States) ONP Racing	2	(United States) Mike Scanlan	Swift DB6	Honda Fit	
(United States) Auriana Racing	4	(United States) Joe Colasacco	Van Diemen RF04	Honda Fit	
(Canada) Rice Race Prep	07	(Canada) Steve Bamford	Mygale	Honda Fit	
(Canada) Rice Race Prep	13	(Canada) Keenan Harris	Van Diemen RF97	Honda Fit	
(Canada) Rice Race Prep	13	(Canada) Greg Rice	Mygale	Honda Fit	
(United States) Red Racing	14	(United States) Ross Devoe	Van Diemen RF93	Ford Kent	
(United States) Maisey Racing	99	(United States) Sean Maisey	Citation	Honda Fit	
(United States) Maisey Racing	43	(United States) Bill Maisey	Piper DF5	Honda Fit	
(United States) RECON Racing	44	(United States) Ed Callo	Bowman BC5	Ford Kent	
(United States) Valet Racing	83	(United States) Bill Valet	Swift DB6	Ford Kent	
	88	(United States) Tim Kautz	Piper DF3	Honda Fit	
(United States) Black Watch Racing Group	7	(United States) Jim Goughary, Jr.	???	???	
	55	(United States) Ray Phillips	Van Diemen RF97	Honda Fit	
(United States) Raceworks	68	(United States) Steve Jenks	Van Diemen RF00	Honda Fit	
(United States) Pennon	18	(United States) Dan Pyanowski	Swift DB1	Ford Kent	
(United States) Polestar Racing Group	0	(United States) Lewis Cooper, III	Van Diemen	???	
(United States) Parsons Racing	42	(United States) Joe Parsons	Swift DB6	Honda Fit	
(United States) Front Range Motorsports	11	(United States) Doug Stout	Swift DB1	Ford Kent	
(United States) Front Range Motorsports	23	(United States) John Butkovich	Swift DB1	Ford Kent	
(Canada) Britain West	23	(Canada) Sergio Pasian	Van Diemen RF??	Ford Kent	
(Canada) Britain West	5	(Canada) David Clubine	Van Diemen RF??	Ford Kent	
(United States) R-Sport	19	(United States) Tim Dunn	Swift DB1	Honda Fit	
(United States) Leading Edge Racing	4	(United States) Bob Detrick	Van Diemen RF98	Ford Kent	
(United States) K-FAST	50	(United States) John Nesbitt	Swift DB1	Ford Kent	
	77	(United States) Michael Kolthoff	Swift DB6	Ford Kent	
(United States) Pricepoint Racing	73	(United States) Ralph Zuponcic	Van Diemen RF98	Ford Kent	
(United States) Jim Lee Racing	76	(United States) Jim Lee	???	???	
	15	(United States) Jim Oseth	Van Diemen RF98	Ford Kent	
	35	(United States) Russ McBride	Swift DB3	Honda Fit	
	73	(United States) Bob Perona	Piper DF3	Ford Kent	
	41	(United States) Steve Roux	Wyvern	Ford Kent	

== Race calendar and results ==
Round	Circuit	Location	Date	Pole position	Fastest lap	Winning driver
1	Virginia International Raceway	(United States) Alton, Virginia	April 14	(Finland) Matias Köykkä	(United States) Colin Thompson	(Finland) Matias Köykkä
2	Virginia International Raceway	(United States) Alton, Virginia	April 15	(Finland) Matias Köykkä	(United States) Jeremy Grenier	(United States) Brandon Newey
3	Lime Rock Park	(United States) Lakeville, Connecticut	May 26	(Finland) Matias Köykkä	(Finland) Matias Köykkä	(Finland) Matias Köykkä
4	Lime Rock Park	(United States) Lakeville, Connecticut	May 26	No qualifying	(United States) Brandon Newey	(United States) Brandon Newey
5	New Jersey Motorsports Park	(United States) Millville, New Jersey	June 30	(Finland) Matias Köykkä	(Australia) Shae Davies	(Australia) Shae Davies
6	New Jersey Motorsports Park	(United States) Millville, New Jersey	July 1	(Australia) Shae Davies	(Finland) Matias Köykkä	(Australia) Shae Davies
7	Mid-Ohio Sports Car Course	(United States) Lexington, Ohio	July 28	(United States) Colin Thompson	(Finland) Matias Köykkä	(United States) Colin Thompson
8	Mid-Ohio Sports Car Course	(United States) Lexington, Ohio	July 29	(Australia) Shae Davies	(United States) Colin Thompson	(Australia) Shae Davies
9	Summit Point Motorsports Park	(United States) Summit Point, West Virginia	August 25	(United States) Brandon Newey	(Finland) Matias Köykkä	(Finland) Matias Köykkä
10	Summit Point Motorsports Park	(United States) Summit Point, West Virginia	August 26	No qualifying	(Canada) Garett Grist	(United States) Brandon Newey
11	Watkins Glen International	(United States) Watkins Glen, New York	October 13	(United States) Brandon Newey	(United States) Neil Alberico	(Finland) Matias Köykkä
12	Watkins Glen International	(United States) Watkins Glen, New York	October 14	(Finland) Matias Köykkä	(United States) Neil Alberico	(United States) Brandon Newey

== Championship standings ==
Pos	Driver	VIR		LRP		NJ		MOH		SUM		WAT		Points
Drivers' championship
1	(Finland) Matias Köykkä	1	DNF	1	9	6	2	2	3	1	3	1	4	444
2	(United States) Brandon Newey	3	1	2	1	11	3	5	4	3	1	2	1	437
3	(United States) Jeremy Grenier	5	7	3	2	3	4	15	9	6	2	6	5	341
4	(Canada) Garett Grist	4	2	11	6	DNS	12	4	2	2	4			295
5	(United States) Stephen Oseth	8	8	7	5	4	7	7	13	4	5	7	6	295
6	(United States) Arthur Foster	6	5	5	10	5	8	10	11	7	7	10	9	266
7	(Brazil) Roberto Lorena	15	11	4	7	7	5	DNF	14	5	6	5	DNF	253
8	(United States) Colin Thompson	2	3			2	6	1	6					236
9	(Australia) Shae Davies					1	1	3	1	13	15			221
10	(United States) Mike Scanlan	10	10	12	8	9	11	21	15	10	11			182
11	(United States) John McCusker	13	15	16	11	10	10			9	14	13	11	167
12	(United States) Joe Colasacco	18	4	8	3			16	10					135
13	(Canada) Steve Bamford	14	6					8	12			12	8	126
14	(United States) Sean Maisey	7	9	15	13					14	13			104
15	(United States) Ross Devoe			10	15	8	9					19	12	104
16	(United States) Ed Callo			14	12					17	12	17	13	80
17	(United States) Neil Alberico											3	3	78
18	(United States) Bill Valet			6	4									63
19	(United States) Tim Kautz							6	5					60
20	(United States) Jim Goughary, Jr.							13	19			4	DNF	57
21	(United States) Ray Phillips									11	9	14	DNF	56
22	(Canada) Keenan Harris											9	7	50
23	(Canada) Jesse Lazare							9	8					48
24	(United States) Steve Jenks							12	DNF			18	10	47
25	(United States) Dan Pyanowski	17	17					17	17			16	DNF	47
26	(United States) Lewis Cooper, III							11	7					46
27	(United States) Joe Parsons									8	10			48
28	(United States) Adrian Starrantino											21	2	43
29	(Japan) Haruaki Tanaka									12	8			42
30	(United States) Doug Stout			13	14			14	DNF					42
31	(Canada) Sergio Pasian											8	14	38
32	(United States) Andy Brumbaugh	9	14											36
33	(United States) Tim Dunn	11	13											34
34	(United States) Bob Detrick			9	16									33
35	(United States) John Nesbitt									16	DNF			33
36	(Canada) David Clubine									DNS	DNS	11		30
37	(United States) John Butkovich	16	12											27
38	(United States) Michael Kolthoff							20	16					16
39	(United States) Ralph Zuponcic							19	18					15
40	(United States) Bill Maisey									15	DNF			12
41	(United States) Jim Oseth											15	DNF	12
42	(United States) Jim Lee	DNF	16											11
43	(United States) Kevin Brumbaugh							18	DNF					9
43	(United States) Russ McBride	DNF	18											9
45	(United States) Bob Perona											20	DNF	6
46	(Canada) Greg Rice							22	DNF					5
47	(United States) Steve Roux							DNS	DNS					0

Color	Result
Gold	Winner
Silver	2nd place
Bronze	3rd place
Green	Other finishers
Purple	Did not finish
Red	Did not qualify (DNQ)
Brown	Withdrawn (Wth)
Black	Disqualified (DSQ)
White	Did not start (DNS)
Blank	Did not participate (DNP)
Blank	Not competing

**In-line notation**
**Bold**	Pole position (3 points)
Italics	Ran fastest race lap (2 points)
