= Brandon Newey =

American racing driver (born 1992)

- Nationality: American
- Born: August 18, 1992 (age 34) Indianapolis, Indiana, U.S.

Pro Mazda Championship career
- Debut season: 2014
- Current team: Team Pelfrey
- Car number: 98
- Starts: 6

Previous series
- 2013 - U.S. F2000 National Championship 2012 F1600 Championship Series; 2010-11 Skip Barber National Championship; 2010 Skip Barber Summer Series; 2005-10 Karting

Brandon Newey (born August 18, 1992) is an American former racing driver. He was classified second in the 2012 F1600 Championship Series season. In 2014 he competed in the Pro Mazda Championship.

== Karting ==
Newey started his career in karts at New Castle Motorsports Park where he raced in various regional and track championships. He made also three appearances at the RoboPong 200 endurance karting race. Fourth was his best result when he partnered up with Josef Newgarden. Newey also raced in selected WKA Manufacturer's Cup events.

== Formula racing ==
Newey made his competitive debut in formula cars in the Skip Barber National Championship in 2010. His best results were two fifth-place finishes at Virginia Motorsports Park and Road Atlanta. He eventually finished eighth in the championship. He also raced in the Skip Barber Summer Series. He started eight races and finished once on the podium.

For 2011, Newey again raced in the Skip Barber National Championship. He scored his first win in the second race at Sebring International Raceway. Newey also won at Road America. He was in the race for the championship for a long time but with a total of ten podium finishes, he was eventually placed third in the championship, behind Trent Hindman and champion Scott Anderson.

Newey signed with Bryan Herta Autosport, for whom he raced various kart races before, to compete in the F1600 Championship Series. Newey was placed first in the first one-two finish for Bryan Herta Autosport, in only the second race of the season. Newey was placed first and his teammate Garett Grist second in Honda Fit powered Mygale SJ12's. Newey went on to win a total of four races including the season finale. He eventually finished second in the championship standings, seven points behind Matias Köykkä.

At the end of the 2011 season, Newey tested a U.S. F2000 in Griffis Memorial Test at the Indianapolis Motor Speedway road course with JDC Motorsports. For the 2013 season, Newey signed with Afterburner Autosport to race in the U.S. F2000 National Championship. He finished 12th in points, competing in twelve of the fourteen races, with a best finish of fifth (twice).

In 2014 his final season, Newey raced in the Pro Mazda Championship for Team Pelfrey.

== Personal ==
His father, Steve Newey, co-owns Bryan Herta Autosport. Brandon was a student at Purdue University where he graduated with a Bachelor of Science in Selling and Sales Management. Brandon Newey is not related to famous Formula One car designer Adrian Newey.

=== Pro Mazda Championship ===
Year	Team	1	2	3	4	5	6	7	8	9	10	11	12	13	14	Rank	Points
2014	Team Pelfrey	STP; 16	STP; 18	BAR; 16	BAR; 12	IMS; 5	IMS; 14	LOR	HOU	HOU	MOH; 10	MOH; 13	MIL	SON	SON	17th	63
