= Team Pelfrey =

Auto racing team

(United States) Team Pelfrey
- Base: Indianapolis, Indiana
- Team principal(s): Dale Pelfrey
- Current series: F1600 Championship Series; F2000 Championship Series
- Former series: IndyCar Series; Indy Lights; Pro Mazda Championship; U.S. F2000 National Championship
- Drivers' Championships: 3: Pro Mazda Championship; 2: F1600 Championship Series

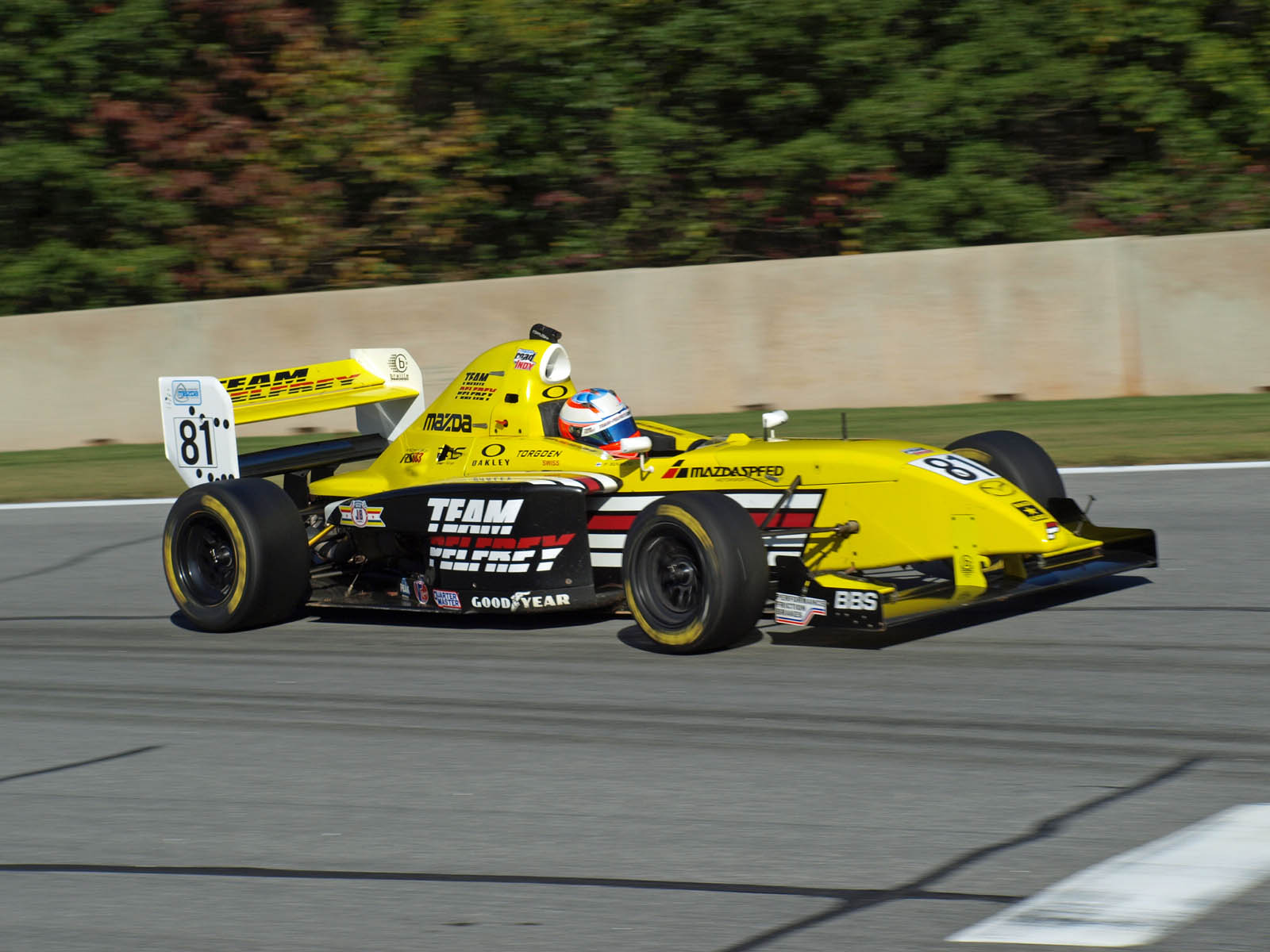
A Team Pelfrey Star Mazda car driven by Petri Suvanto in 2012

Team Pelfrey is an American racing team in the F1600 Championship Series and F2000 Championship Series. The team is owned by Dale Pelfrey.

== Indy Racing League (1998–2000) ==
John Paul Jr. replaced Danny Ongais as driver for the 1998 Indianapolis 500 due to Ongais crashing and suffering a concussion. Paul Jr. finished seventh and led the race. Robby Unser drove for Pelfrey in 1999. Lyn St. James failed to qualify for the 1999 Indianapolis 500 due to rain on the final qualifying day and a backup car accident. The team was put up for auction on eBay in June 1999. The high bid was $1,500,300 and did not meet the reserve of $3 million. Sarah Fisher raced for the team at Texas Motor Speedway in 1999. Billy Boat drove for Pelfrey after being unable to fund his own team for the 2000 Indy Racing League season. Boat wrecked his Pelfrey primary car for the 2000 Indianapolis 500, but would qualify driving for A. J. Foyt Enterprises.

== Road to Indy (2011–present) ==
=== USF2000 and Pro Mazda ===
The team returned to racing in the 2011 Star Mazda Championship with driver Nick Andries. Jack Hawksworth won the 2012 Star Mazda Championship. Pelfrey would join the U.S. F2000 National Championship in 2015. Santiago Urrutia won the 2015 Pro Mazda Championship. Both series teams underwent a leadership change in May 2016, with Dale Pelfrey taking over operations from Nigel Tuckey. Aaron Telitz won the 2016 Pro Mazda Championship over teammate Patricio O'Ward. Team Pelfrey's USF2000 and Pro Mazda teams moved from Pompano Beach, Florida to Indianapolis, Indiana in late 2016. The team was located at TKM Inc. under Thomas Knapp. Pelfrey shut down its USF2000 after the 2018 season.

=== Indy Lights ===
==== 2016 ====
Team Pelfrey purchased 8 Star Motorsports and entered two cars in the 2016 Indy Lights series. Felix Rosenqvist tested with the team at Palm Beach International Raceway, but would later sign with Belardi Auto Racing. Juan Piedrahita became the team's full-time driver, with Scott Hargrove running several races. Garett Grist moved up from Pro Mazda for the road course races starting at Road America, replacing Hargrove. Piedrahita left the team after Toronto and Sean Rayhall joined for Mazda Raceway Laguna Seca.

==== 2017 ====
Juan Piedrahita rejoined Team Pelfrey for the 2017 Indy Lights season. Patricio O'Ward joined the team for St. Petersburg and finished third in race two. Piedrahita won the pole at Gateway and finished 2nd.

==== 2018 ====
Neil Alberico and Shelby Blackstock joined the team for St. Petersburg. Davey Hamilton Jr. joined for the Freedom 100. The team moved its operations from Florida to Indianapolis before the 2019 season.

==== 2019 ====
Toby Sowery joined the team for St. Petersburg. Sowery won for HMD Motorsports/Team Pelfrey at the Sunday Portland race.

== Driver history ==
=== Indy Racing League ===
- (United States) Billy Boat (2000)
- (United States) Tyce Carlson (1998)
- (United States) Memo Gidley (2000)
- (United States) Lyn St. James (1998–1999)
- (United States) Sarah Fisher (1999)
- (United States) Danny Ongais (1998)
- (United States) John Paul Jr. (1998)
- (United States) Robby Unser (1999)

=== Road to Indy ===
==== Indy Lights (2016–present) ====
- (Canada) Garett Grist (2016)
- (Canada) Scott Hargrove (2016)
- (Mexico) Patricio O'Ward (2017)
- (Colombia) Juan Piedrahita (2016)
- (United States) Sean Rayhall (2016)
- (United States) Davey Hamilton Jr. (2018)
- (United States) Shelby Blackstock (2018)

==== Pro Mazda Championship (2011–present) ====
- (United Kingdom) Jack Aitken (2014)
- (United States) Nick Andries (2011)
- (Brazil) Nicolas Costa (2013–2014)
- (Brazil) Carlos Cunha Filho (2017–present)
- (United States) Connor De Phillippi (2011)
- (Brazil) Pipo Derani (2014)
- (United States) TJ Fischer (2016–present)
- (United Kingdom) Jack Hawksworth (2012 series champion)
- (Canada) Dalton Kellett (2013–2014)
- (Norway) Anders Krohn (2013–2014)
- (Russia) Nikita Lastochkin (2017–present)
- (United States) Gustavo Menezes (2012)
- (United States) Brandon Newey (2014)
- (Mexico) Patricio O'Ward (2015–2016)
- (United Kingdom) Raoul Owens (2015)
- (United States) Spencer Pigot (2013)
- (Canada) Stefan Rzadzinski (2013)
- (Finland) Petri Suvanto (2012–2013)
- (Malaysia) Weiron Tan (2016)
- (United States) Aaron Telitz (2016 series champion)
- (United States) Ryan Tveter (2012)
- (Uruguay) Santiago Urrutia (2015 series champion)

==== U.S. F2000 National Championship (2015–present) ====
- (Norway) Ayla Ågren (2015, 2017–present)
- (United Kingdom) Jordan Cane (2016)
- (United States) Phillippe Denes (2016–present)
- (United States) Kaylen Frederick (2016–present)
- (Australia) Luke Gabin (2015)
- (Russia) Nikita Lastochkin (2015)
- (United States) Jacob Loomis (2017–present)
- (United States) Robert Megennis (2016–present)
- (New Zealand) James Munro (2016)
- (United States) Garth Rickards (2015)

== Complete racing results ==
=== Indy Racing League ===
(key)

Indy Racing League results
Year	Chassis	Engine	Drivers	No.	1	2	3	4	5	6	7	8	9	10	11	Pts Pos	Pos
1998					WDW	PHX	INDY	TXS	NHA	DOV	CLT	PPIR	ATL	TXS	LSV		
1998	Dallara IR7	Oldsmobile Aurora V8	(United States) Danny Ongais	81			Wth									NC	—
1998	Dallara IR7	Oldsmobile Aurora V8	(United States) John Paul Jr.	81			8									11th	216
1998	Dallara IR7	Oldsmobile Aurora V8	(United States) Tyce Carlson	81				12								27th	73
1998	Dallara IR7	Oldsmobile Aurora V8	(United States) Brian Tyler	81					14	12	16	16	21	13	6	18th	140
1999					WDW	PHX	CLT	INDY	TXS	PPIR	ATL	DOV	PPIR	LSV	TXS		
1999	Dallara IR7	Oldsmobile Aurora V8	(United States) Sarah Fisher (R)	48											17	46th	5
1999	Dallara IR7	Oldsmobile Aurora V8	(United States) Robby Unser	81	15	26	C^{1}	8	6	6	2	12	9	16	14	10th	209
1999	Dallara IR7	Oldsmobile Aurora V8	(United States) Lyn St. James	90				DNQ								NC	—
2000					WDW	PHX	LSV	INDY	TXS	PPIR	ATL	KTY	TXS				
2000	Dallara IR-00	Oldsmobile Aurora V8	(United States) Billy Boat	81	9	6	7	Wth	23	18	8	18	3			10th	181
2000	Dallara IR-00	Oldsmobile Aurora V8	(United States) Memo Gidley	82				DNQ								NC	—

1. The 1999 VisionAire 500K at Charlotte was cancelled after 79 laps due to spectator fatalities.

=== Indy Lights ===
(key)

Indy Lights results
Year	Chassis	Engine	Drivers	No.	1	2	3	4	5	6	7	8	9	10	11	12	13	14	15	16	17	18	Points		Position	
2016					STP		PHX	ALA		IMS		INDY	ROA		IOW	TOR		MOH		WGL	LAG		D.C.	T.C.	D.C.	T.C.
2016	Dallara IL-15	Mazda-AER P63 2.0 Turbo I4	(Colombia) Juan Piedrahita	2	9	8	12	7	16	15	11	8	12	7	7	14	12						135	135	13th	6th
2016	Dallara IL-15	Mazda-AER P63 2.0 Turbo I4	(United States) Sean Rayhall	2																	4	8	32	135	19th	6th
2016	Dallara IL-15	Mazda-AER P63 2.0 Turbo I4	(Canada) Scott Hargrove (R)	3	2	14	13	13	12	14	9	5											93	135	16th	6th
2016	Dallara IL-15	Mazda-AER P63 2.0 Turbo I4	(Canada) Garett Grist (R)	3									7	10		7	7	10	12	8	11	15	102	135	15th	6th
2017					STP		ALA		IMS		INDY	ROA		IOW	TOR		MOH		GAT	LAG			D.C.	T.C.	D.C.	T.C.
2017	Dallara IL-15	Mazda-AER P63 2.0 Turbo I4	(Colombia) Juan Piedrahita	2	14	10	11	11	DNS	5	8	5	10	10	6	4	10	11	2*	9			208	162	9th	5th
2017	Dallara IL-15	Mazda-AER P63 2.0 Turbo I4	(Mexico) Patricio O'Ward (R)	3	5	3	8	15															58	162	15th	5th
2018					STP		ALA		IMS		INDY	ROA		IOW	TOR		MOH		GAT	POR			D.C.	T.C.	D.C.	T.C.
2018	Dallara IL-15	Mazda-AER P63 2.0 Turbo I4	(United States) Neil Alberico	2	7	5																	31	59	9th	4th
2018	Dallara IL-15	Mazda-AER P63 2.0 Turbo I4	(United States) Davey Hamilton Jr.	2							7												21	59	12th	4th
2018	Dallara IL-15	Mazda-AER P63 2.0 Turbo I4	(United States) Shelby Blackstock	3	5	2																	42	59	8th	4th
2019					STP		COTA		IMS		INDY	ROA		TOR		MOH		GAT	POR		LAG		D.C.	T.C.	D.C.	T.C.
2019	Dallara IL-15	Mazda-AER P63 2.0 Turbo I4	(United Kingdom) Toby Sowery	2	2	3	5	6	7	5	4	4	8	5	2	9	2	8	4	1*	2	3	367		3rd	

=== Star Mazda/Pro Mazda Championship ===
key)

Pro Mazda Championship results
Year	Chassis	Engine	Drivers	No.	1	2	3	4	5	6	7	8	9	10	11	12	13	14	15	16	17	Points		Position	
2011					STP	ALA	IRP	MIL	IOW	MOS	TRO		SNM	BAL	LAG							D.C.	T.C.	D.C.	T.C.
2011	Star Race Cars	Mazda Renesis	(United States) Connor De Phillippi	11	1	10	1	6	11	2	5	1	2	10	1							401	293	2nd	1st
2011	Star Race Cars	Mazda Renesis	(United States) Nick Andries (R)	81	DNF	4	3	2	3	9	2											385	293	3rd	1st
2012					STP		ALA		IRP	IOW	TOR		EDM		TRO		BAL		LAG		ATL	D.C.	T.C.	D.C.	T.C.
2012	Star Race Cars	Mazda Renesis	(Finland) Petri Suvanto (R)	81	5	3	6	6	5	4	6	8	19	4	14	4	4	4	5	5	6	271	451	5th	1st
2012	Star Race Cars	Mazda Renesis	(United Kingdom) Jack Hawksworth (R)	82	2	1	1	2	7	15	1	1	7	1	1	12	1	2	1	2		397	451	1st	1st
2012	Star Race Cars	Mazda Renesis	(United States) Ryan Tveter (R)	82																	14	91	451	18th	1st
2012	Star Race Cars	Mazda Renesis	(United States) Gustavo Menezes	83	13	10	7	16	6	13	8	6	13	5	7	6	7	16	6	8	7	208	451	9th	1st
2013					COTA		STP		IRP	MIL	TOR		MOS		MOH		TRO		HOU			D.C.	T.C.	D.C.	T.C.
2013	Star Race Cars	Mazda Renesis	(Canada) Dalton Kellett (R)	80									10	8								—	377	NC	2nd
2013	Star Race Cars	Mazda Renesis	(United States) Spencer Pigot (R)	81	2	16	4	4	2	3	9	11	1*	4*	4	5	5	5	2	5		297	377	4th	2nd
2013	Star Race Cars	Mazda Renesis	(Finland) Petri Suvanto	82	5	5	11	8														57	377	10th	2nd
2013	Star Race Cars	Mazda Renesis	(Norway) Anders Krohn	82					4	4												—	377	NC	2nd
2013	Star Race Cars	Mazda Renesis	(Brazil) Nicolas Costa (R)	82							3	6	5	10	15	3			3	2		—	377	NC	2nd
2013	Star Race Cars	Mazda Renesis	(Canada) Stefan Rzadzinski	83													8	12				—	377	NC	2nd
2014					STP		ALA		IMS		IRP	HOU		MOH		MIL	SNM					D.C.	T.C.	D.C.	T.C.
2014	Star Race Cars	Mazda Renesis	(Canada) Dalton Kellett	80	9	11	10	11	4	19	DNS	3	7	8	8	11	7	10				160	259	10th	3rd
2014	Star Race Cars	Mazda Renesis	(Brazil) Pipo Derani (R)	81	4	3	6	4	9	18												88	259	14th	3rd
2014	Star Race Cars	Mazda Renesis	(Norway) Anders Krohn	81							5											17	259	25th	3rd
2014	Star Race Cars	Mazda Renesis	(United Kingdom) Jack Aitken (R)	81													9	4				31	259	20th	3rd
2014	Star Race Cars	Mazda Renesis	(United States) Brandon Newey (R)	81										10	13							63	259	17th	3rd
2014	Star Race Cars	Mazda Renesis	(United States) Brandon Newey (R)	82	16	18	16	12	5	14												63	259	17th	3rd
2014	Star Race Cars	Mazda Renesis	(Brazil) Nicolas Costa	82								2	5	1*	2	5	4	2				224	259	5th	3rd
2014	Star Race Cars	Mazda Renesis	(Brazil) Nicolas Costa	99							4											224	259	5th	3rd
2015					STP		NOLA		ALA		IMS			IRP	TOR		IOW	MOH		LAG		D.C.	T.C.	D.C.	T.C.
2015	Star Race Cars	Mazda Renesis	(United Kingdom) Raoul Owens (R)	80						11	18	11	12	14	8	6	12	13	13	7	16	166	387	12th	2nd
2015	Star Race Cars	Mazda Renesis	(Uruguay) Santiago Urrutia (R)	81	2	4	1*	C	3	2	4	3	1*	15	7	4	5	1*	3	2	2	355	387	1st	2nd
2015	Star Race Cars	Mazda Renesis	(Mexico) Patricio O'Ward (R)	84	4	14	4	C	5	7	6	10	5	7	2	3	3	7	6	18	6	250	387	6th	2nd
2016					STP		ALA		IMS		IRP	ROA		TOR		MOH		LAG				D.C.	T.C.	D.C.	T.C.
2016	Star Race Cars	Mazda Renesis	(Mexico) Patricio O'Ward	80	1*	2	1	1*	1*	1*	1*	4	4	9	2	7	4	1*	10	6		393	553	2nd	1st
2016	Star Race Cars	Mazda Renesis	(Malaysia) Weiron Tan	81	5	3	4	10														69	553	11th	1st
2016	Star Race Cars	Mazda Renesis	(United States) TJ Fischer (R)	81								5	6	6	6	6	5	6	11	7		137	553	7th	1st
2016	Star Race Cars	Mazda Renesis	(United States) Aaron Telitz (R)	82	2	1*	2*	2	7	2	5	1*	1*	1*	1*	2	3	2	5	1*		421	553	1st	1st
2017					STP		IMS		ROA		MOH			GAT	WGL							D.C.	T.C.	D.C.	T.C.
2017	Star Race Cars	Mazda Renesis	(Russia) Nikita Lastochkin (R)	80	5	5	6	5	3	3	5	5	6	6	13	4						203	381	5th	1st
2017	Star Race Cars	Mazda Renesis	(Brazil) Carlos Cunha (R)	81	4	12	4	3	9	4	4	3	3	3	3	2						237	381	3rd	1st
2017	Star Race Cars	Mazda Renesis	(United States) TJ Fischer	82	3	3	3	2	15	12	3	4	4	4	10	5						224	381	4th	1st
2017	Star Race Cars	Mazda Renesis	(United States) Robert Megennis (R)	84											12	DNS						21	381	13th	1st
2018					STP		ALA		IMS		IRP	ROA		TOR		MOH		GAT	POR			D.C.	T.C.	D.C.	T.C.
2018	Tatuus PM-18	Mazda MZR-R PM18At	(Brazil) Rafael Martins (R)	80	16	9	6	8														45	167	19th	6th
2018	Tatuus PM-18	Mazda MZR-R PM18At	(Mexico) Andrés Gutiérrez (R)	81	14	8	4	7	12	5		10	7	10	12	12	DNS					137	167	11th	6th
2018	Tatuus PM-18	Mazda MZR-R PM18At	(United States) Sting Ray Robb	82	6	4	9	10	13	3	5	11	9	11	7	9	4	9	6	6		231	167	7th	6th

=== U.S. F2000 National Championship ===
key)

U.S. F2000 National Championship results
Year	Chassis	Engine	Drivers	No.	1	2	3	4	5	6	7	8	9	10	11	12	13	14	15	16	Points		Position	
2015					STP		NOLA		ALA		IMS		IRP	TOR		MOH			LAG		D.C.	T.C.	D.C.	T.C.
2015	Élan DP08	Mazda MZR	(Norway) Ayla Ågren (R)	81	9	10	9	11	9	10	6	14	11	7	9	10	6	11	11	7	186	188	10th	4th
2015	Élan DP08	Mazda MZR	(Australia) Luke Gabin (R)	82	17	9	8	14	15	14	5	4	8	4	3	7	7	6	15	15	194	188	6th	4th
2015	Élan DP08	Mazda MZR	(United States) Garth Rickards (R)	83	7	15	11	8	6	11	7	17	9	5	6	18	5	8	9	10	186	188	9th	4th
2015	Élan DP08	Mazda MZR	(Russia) Nikita Lastochkin (R)	84	10	8	10	12	10	8	8	7	12	8	8	11	10	10	7	5	193	188	8th	4th
2016					STP		ALA		IMS		IRP	ROA		TOR		MOH			LAG		D.C.	T.C.	D.C.	T.C.
2016	Élan DP08	Mazda MZR	(United States) Robert Megennis (R)	80	3	8	12	3	8	10	6	7	11	5	5	19	4	7	8	8	224	180	6th	5th
2016	Élan DP08	Mazda MZR	(United Kingdom) Jordan Cane (R)	81	25	3	6	19	10	21											121	180	13th	5th
2016	Élan DP08	Mazda MZR	(United States) Kaylen Frederick (R)	81															13	13	16	180	24th	5th
2016	Élan DP08	Mazda MZR	(United States) TJ Fischer (R)	82	22	9	13	10	9	9											58	180	19th	5th
2016	Élan DP08	Mazda MZR	(United States) Phillippe Denes (R)	82															7	11	24	180	22nd	5th
2016	Élan DP08	Mazda MZR	(New Zealand) James Munro (R)	83	18	21	11	23													20	180	23rd	5th
2017					STP		ALA		IMS		ROA		IOW	TOR		MOH		WGL			D.C.	T.C.	D.C.	T.C.
2017	Tatuus USF-17	Mazda MZR	(United States) Robert Megennis	80	1*	19	4	6	DSQ	7	7	15	5	13	5	17	7	10			173	258	6th	3rd
2017	Tatuus USF-17	Mazda MZR	(United States) Kaylen Frederick	81	4	5	2	2	DSQ	3	6	4	6	17	3	7	3	4			240	258	4th	3rd
2017	Tatuus USF-17	Mazda MZR	(Norway) Ayla Ågren	82	21	12	8	8	7	12			8								72	258	17th	3rd
2017	Tatuus USF-17	Mazda MZR	(United States) Jacob Loomis (R)	82							11	19									13	258	32nd	3rd
2017	Tatuus USF-17	Mazda MZR	(United States) Phillippe Denes	82												18	18	13			15	258	30th	3rd
2018					STP		IMS		IRP	ROA		TOR		MOH			POR				D.C.	T.C.	D.C.	T.C.
2018	Tatuus USF-17	Mazda MZR	(South Africa) Julian van der Watt	80	5	11	7	8	19	24	17	10	5	5	8	14	9	3			162	101	7th	8th
2018	Tatuus USF-17	Mazda MZR	(United States) Kyle Dupell (R)	81	9	15	16	23	17	13	21	15	9	15	14	13	10	10			100	101	15th	8th
2018	Tatuus USF-17	Mazda MZR	(Brazil) Bruna Tomaselli	82	7	14	19	22	14	17	11	13	13	20	13	16	18	16			87	101	16th	8th

=== F1600 Championship ===
key)

F1600 Championship Series results
Year	Car	No.	Driver	1	2	3	4	5	6	7	8	9	10	11	12	13	14	15	16	17	18	19	20	21	22	23	24	Pos	Points
2020				PITT			MO			VIR			SP			PITT			RA										
2020	Mygale	23	Baylor Griffin																3	4	5							23rd	102
2020	Mygale	80	(United States) Maxwell Esterson	4	4	3	4	5	2	12	1	3	17	5	4	8	14	DSQ										5th	423
2020	Mygale	81	(United States) David Adorno																13	12	12							35th	51
2020	Mygale	81	(United States) Dylan Christie	2	2	8																						2nd	599
2020	Mygale	82	(United States) Dylan Christie				2	3	9	DNF	7	2	3	1	1	2	1	5	1	2	4							2nd	599
2020	Mygale	82	(United States) Dexter Czuba	6	5	5																						3rd	515
2020	Mygale	81	(United States) Dexter Czuba				3	1	3	3	3	4	4	6	5	4	3	10										3rd	515
2021				CMP			MO			BAR			PITT			RA			SP			ABCC			PITT				
2021	Mygale	81	(United States) Nicholas d'Orlando	13	1	1	3	2	2	DNF	1	1	1	26	1	3	5	1	DNF	1	1	1	2	3	1	1	DNF	1st	901
2021	Mygale	80	(United States) Hugh Esterson	3	12	7	7	4	10	2	9	8	2	16	3	6	11	6	DNF	7	4	6	9	2	3	3	3	5th	642
2021	Mygale	84	(United States) David Adorno				21	18	15	8	11	14	16	8	10	11	12	8	18	17	8	11	11	14	11	11	6	10th	358
2022				CMP			MO			BAR			PITT			ABCC			SP			PITT							
2022	Mygale	80	(United States) Hugh Esterson	DNF	3	14	4	6	2	1	3	3	1	2	16	4	9	3	4	1	18	2	2	3				3rd	678
2022	Mygale	81	(United States) Nolan Allaer	2	19	4	22	9	6	3	4	7	3	4	1	6	4	5	1	3	12	3	3	2				4th	647
2022	Mygale	82	(United States) Ayrton Houk	1	2	2	3	1	13	4	1	5	10	1	3	7	3	16	17	2	1	9	4	4				2nd	704
2022	Mygale	84	(United States) David Adorno							12	14	8	DNS	20	DNF	8	10	8	7	9	5	21	11	22				14th	247
2023				RAT			MO			LRP			PITT			RA			NJMP			SP							
2023	Mygale	80	(United States) Sebastian Mateo Naranjo	2	7	19	7	6	8	9	11	5	4	3	1	4	2	4	4	5	5	3	20	3				4th	597
2023	Mygale	81	(United States) Dillion Defonce	7	8	8	11	7	8	12	3	14																13rd	219
2023	Mygale	81	Connor Willis																5	7	8							32nd	83
2023	Mygale	82	(United States) Karsten Defonce	11	23	16	25	9	15	11	8	13																20th	170
2023	Mygale	83	(United States) Ken Bouquillion	18	16	24				13	4	11	10	7	6	6	9	9	8	8	20							10th	291
2023	Mygale	88	(United States) Dexter Czuba							10	9	7																38th	71
2023	Mygale	88	(United States) Hugh Esterson										6	DNF	25													48th	31
2024				RAT			MO			LRP			PITT			RA			NJMP			SP							
2024	Mygale	80	(United States) Sebastian Mateo Naranjo	C	1	1	3	2	3	2	1	1	1	1	1	1	15	8	1	3	2	10	6	C				1st	793

=== F2000 Championship Series ===
F2000 Championship Series results
Year	Car	No.	Driver	1	2	3	4	5	6	7	8	9	10	11	12	13	14	15	16	Pos	Points
2021				CMP		MO		BAR		PITT		RA		SP		ABCC		PITT			
2021	Elan	56	(Canada) Mac Clark			1	1													9th	110
2021	Elan	89	(United States) Dexter Czuba			8	3	4	4	3	3	3	2							4th	283
2022				CMP		MO		BAR		PITT		ABCC		SP		PITT					
2022	Van Diemen	84	(United States) David Adorno	3	3	9	9													12th	114
