= Scott Hargrove =

Canadian racing driver

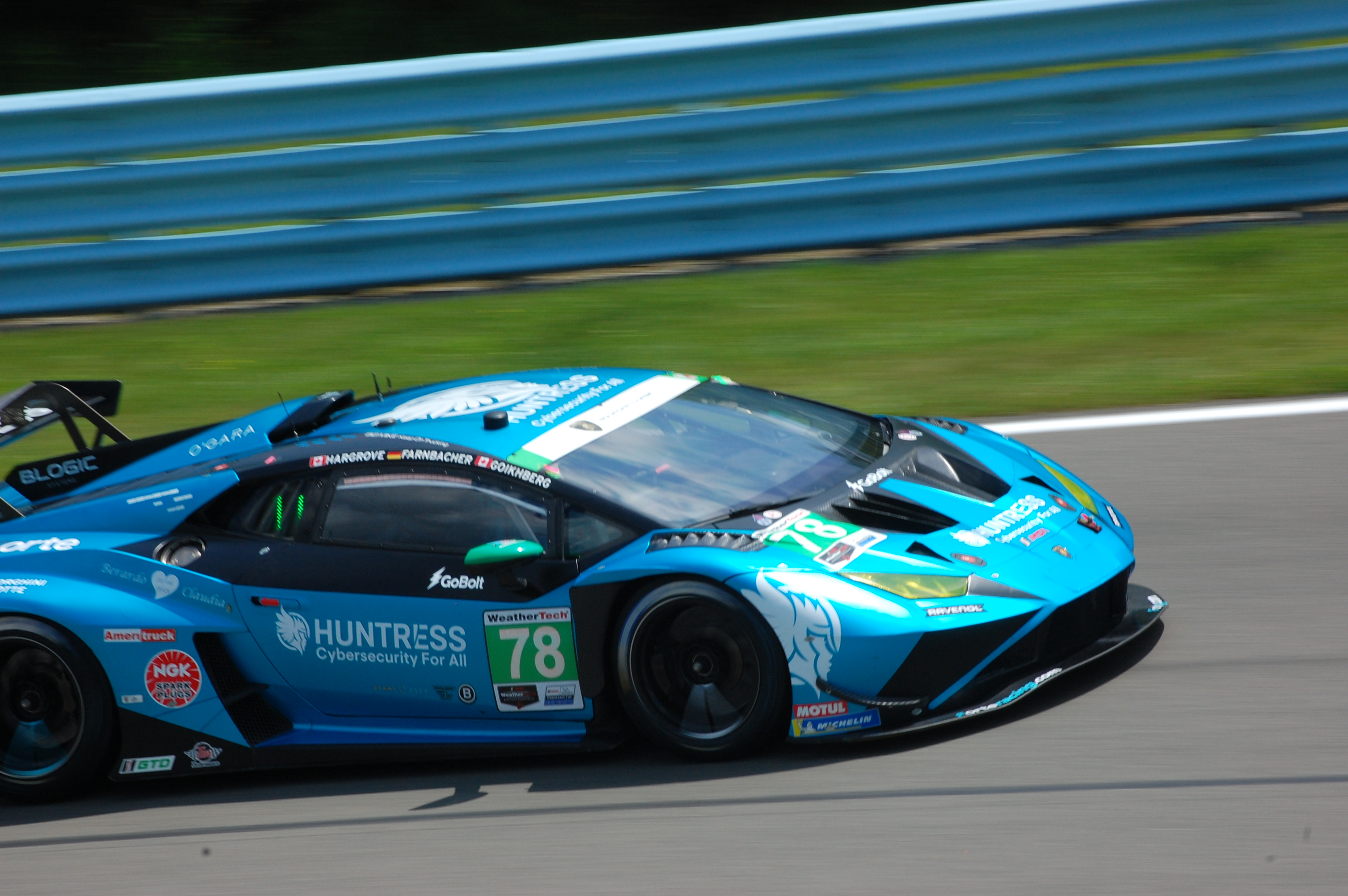
- Hargrove in 2025
- Nationality: (Canada) Canadian
- Born: February 1, 1995 (age 31) Vancouver, British Columbia, Canada
- Categorisation: FIA Gold (until 2021); FIA Silver (2022–)

Scott Hargrove (born February 1, 1995) is a Canadian racing driver from Vancouver, British Columbia.

Hargrove is the most successful driver in the IMSA Porsche GT3 Cup Challenge Canada history. Having competed in both Sports car racing and Open-wheel car racing, Hargrove has become one of Canada's premier racing drivers.

== Motorsports career ==
Hargrove began karting in 2008, winning several championships in Canada and on the west coast of the United States.

In 2010, Hargrove won the Skip Barber Racing School karting shoot-out. This granted him a scholarship to compete in the championship the following year.

In 2011, Hargrove made his car racing debut in the Skip Barber Racing School summer series in 2011, finishing second in his inaugural year of car racing.

In 2012, Hargrove moved to the U.S. F2000 National Championship driving for JDC Motorsports.

In 2013, Hargrove switched teams to Cape Motorsports with Wayne Taylor Racing. Hargrove finished second in the Winterfest and then won the 2013 series championship, capturing four wins. With his championship, Hargrove won a $383,000 USD scholarship to compete in the Pro Mazda Championship in 2014 through the Road to Indy program. Hargrove was also selected to represent Canada at the 2013 Formula Ford Festival in England through the Team Canada Scholarship.

In 2014, Hargrove won the Platinum Cup Championship in the IMSA Porsche GT3 Cup Challenge Canada and finished second in the Pro Mazda Championship, after a failed gearbox in the final race of the season took away his championship lead. He was invited to the Porsche Young Driver Academy for evaluation at the end of the year.

In 2015, Hargrove followed up his previous IMSA Porsche GT3 Cup Challenge Canada season with third in the championship, after missing the first two events, winning all but one of the remaining races in the championship.

In 2016, Hargrove competed in both the Indy Lights Championship and the IMSA Porsche GT3 Cup Challenge Canada. The first Indy Lights race of the year in St. Petersburg, FL, saw Hargrove finish second with Team Pelfrey, who was making their debut as an Indy Lights team. At the conclusion of 2016, Hargrove was invited by Porsche to compete in their Junior Driver Shoot-out.

In 2017, was another stand-out year for Hargrove, where he dominated the IMSA Porsche GT3 Cup Challenge Canada. This time racing for Pfaff Motorsports, Hargrove would win all but two races to claim the championship.

In 2018, Hargrove moved up to the Blancpain GT World Challenge America formerly known as the Pirelli World Challenge. In his rookie season, Hargrove won the Sprint GT Championship, and finished third in the Sprint-X GT Championship, co-driving with Porsche factory driver Wolf Henzler.

In 2019, Hargrove became a Porsche Selected Driver and moved to the WeatherTech SportsCar Championship with Pfaff Motorsports. Hargrove had a best finish of third at Petit Le Mans. Hargrove also raced in the Blancpain GT World Challenge America Championship, co-driving with Porsche factory driver Patrick Long.

== Motorsports Career Results ==
=== IMSA WeatherTech SportsCar Championship ===
(key) (Races in bold indicate pole position; races in italics indicate fastest lap)

Year	Team	Class	Make	Engine	1	2	3	4	5	6	7	8	9	10	11	Rank	Points
2019	Pfaff Motorsports	GTD	Porsche 911 GT3 R	Porsche 4.0 L Flat-6	DAY; 16	SEB; 10	MID; 12	BEL	WGI; 6	MOS; 5	LIM	ELK	VIR; 4	LGA; 4	ATL; 3	12th	192
2024	Andretti Motorsports	GTD	Porsche 911 GT3 R (992)	Porsche 4.2 L Flat-6	DAY; 9	SEB; 8	LBH	LGA	WGL; 10	MOS	ELK	VIR	IMS; 14	ATL		40th	889
2025	Forte Racing	GTD	Lamborghini Huracán GT3 Evo 2	Lamborghini DGF 5.2 L V10	DAY	SEB	LBH	LGA	WGL; 14	MOS	ELK	VIR	IMS	ATL		78th	193

=== Blancpain GT World Challenge America (Formerly Pirelli World Challenge) ===
Year	Team	Class	1	2	3	4	5	6	7	8	9	10	11	12	13	14	Rank	Points
2018	Pfaff Motorsports	Sprint	STP; 1	STP; 1	LGB; 4	MOS; 4	MOS; 6	ROA; 3	ROA; 4	WGL; 6	WGL; 2						**1st**	**182**
2018	Pfaff Motorsports	Sprint-X	COA; 4	COA; 3	VIR; 3	VIR; 2	LRP; 3	LRP; 4	PIR; 3	PIR; 2	UMC; 4	UMC; 7					**3rd**	**187**
2019	Wright Motorsports	GT	COA; 3	COA; 3	VIR; 5	VIR; 2	MOS; 5	MOS; 4	SON; 5	SON; 1	WGL; 4	WGL; 4	ROA; 2	ROA; 4	LAS; 4	LAS; DNS	**5th**	**160**

=== IMSA Porsche GT3 Cup Challenge Canada ===
Year	Team	1	2	3	4	5	6	7	8	9	10	11	12	Rank	Points
2014	Open Road Racing	CTMP; 1	CTMP; 1	CMP; 2	CMP; 1	TOR; 1	TOR; 2	GP3R; 2	GP3R; 2	CTMP; 1	CTMP; 1			**1st**	**192**
2015	Open Road Racing	CTMP	CTMP	TOR; 1	TOR; 2	CMP; 1	CMP; 1	GP3R; 1	GP3R; 1	CTMP; 1	CTMP; 1			**3rd**	**158**
2016	Open Road Racing	CTMP; 2	CTMP; 8	CGV; 1	CGV; 1	WGI; 2	WGI; 1	TOR; 6	TOR; 1	GP3R; 1	GP3R; 8	CTMP; 1	CTMP; 2	**2nd**	**200**
2017	Pfaff Motorsports	CTMP; 1	CTMP; 1	GP3R; 1	GP3R; 1	WGI; 2	TOR; 1	TOR; 1	CGV; 1	CGV; 1	CTMP; 1	CTMP; 1	CTMP; 2	**1st**	**246**

=== U.S. F2000 National Championship ===
Year	Team	1	2	3	4	5	6	7	8	9	10	11	12	13	14	Rank	Points
2012	JDC Motorsports	SEB; 11	SEB; 11	STP; 30	STP; 32	LOR	MOH	MOH	ROA; 8	ROA; 13	ROA; 9	BAL; 6	BAL; 3	VIR; 5	VIR; 4	**11th**	**128**
2013	Cape Motorsports Wayne Taylor Racing	SEB; 1	SEB; 2	STP; 1	STP; 1	LOR; 5	TOR; 15	TOR; 2	MOH; 17	MOH; 2	MOH; 2	LAG; 11	LAG; 1	HOU; 3	HOU; 21	**1st**	**294**

=== Pro Mazda Championship ===
Year	Team	1	2	3	4	5	6	7	8	9	10	11	12	13	14	15	16	17	Rank	Points
2014	Cape Motorsports Wayne Taylor Racing	STP; 3	STP; 5	BAR; 2	BAR; 2	IMS; 1	IMS; 1	LOR; 2	HOU; 1	HOU; 16	MOH; 6	MOH; 3	MIL; 2	SON; 3	SON; 18				**2nd**	**299**
2015	JDC Motorsports	STP	STP	LOU	LOU	BAR	BAR	IMS; 7	IMS; 12	IMS; 9	LOR	TOR	TOR	IOW	MOH	MOH	LAG	LAG	**20th**	**21**

=== Indy Lights ===
Year	Team	1	2	3	4	5	6	7	8	9	10	11	12	13	14	15	16	17	18	Rank	Points
2015	8 Star Motorsports	STP; 4	STP; 6	LBH	ALA	ALA	IMS	IMS	INDY	TOR	TOR	MIL	IOW	MOH	MOH	LAG	LAG			14th	34
2016	Team Pelfrey	STP; 2	STP; 14	PHX; 13	ALA; 13	ALA; 12	IMS; 14	IMS; 9	INDY; 5	RDA	RDA	IOW	TOR	TOR	MOH	MOH	WGL	LAG	LAG	16th	93
