= José Gutiérrez (racing driver) =

Mexican racing driver

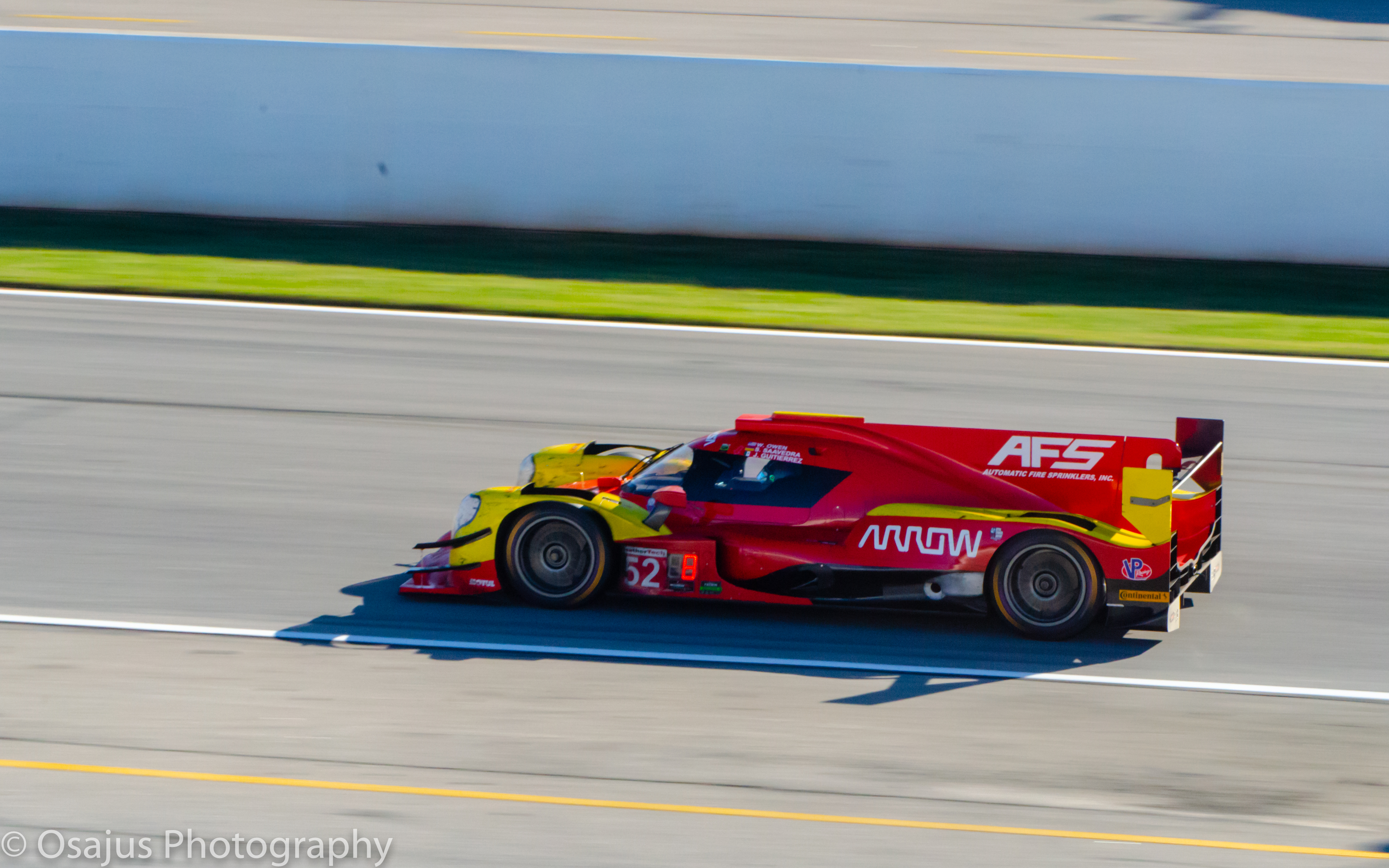
- Gutiérrez in 2018
- Nationality: (Mexico) Mexican
- Born: May 28, 1996 (age 30) Monterrey, Mexico
- Relatives: Esteban Gutiérrez (brother)
- Categorisation: FIA Silver

José Gutiérrez (born May 28, 1996) is a Mexican former racing driver. He is the younger brother of former Formula One driver Esteban Gutiérrez.

== Racing record ==
=== Career summary ===
Season	Series	Team	Races	Wins	Podiums	Points	Position
2013	Latam Fórmula 2000	Prisma	4	0	4	80	8th
2013	Pro Mazda Championship Presented by Cooper Tires	Juncos Racing	4	0	0	0	-
2014	Pro Mazda Championship Presented by Cooper Tires	Juncos Racing	14	1	2	201	7th
2014	Pro Mazda Winterfest	Juncos Racing	4	0	0	55	7th
2015	Pro Mazda Championship Presented by Cooper Tires	Juncos Racing	16	0	1	216	9th
2015	Cooper Tires Winterfest - Pro Mazda	Juncos Racing	5	0	0	77	8th
2016	WeatherTech SportsCar Championship - Prototype Challenge	PR1/Mathiasen Motorsports 1-2, 6, 11; Starworks Motorsport 8-10	7	1	3	210	8th
2017	IMSA WeatherTech Sportscar Championship - Prototype	PR1/Mathiasen Motorsports	7	0	0	167	12th
2017	FIA World Endurance Championship - LMP2	G-Drive Racing	1	0	0	12	25th
2018	IMSA WeatherTech Sportscar Championship - Prototype	PR1/Mathiasen Motorsports	1	0	0	19	56th
2018	European Le Mans Series - LMP2	G-Drive Racing	4	0	0	9	19th

== Motorsports career results ==
=== American open–wheel racing ===
(key) (Races in bold indicate pole position; races in italics indicate fastest lap)

==== Pro Mazda Championship ====
Year	Team	1	2	3	4	5	6	7	8	9	10	11	12	13	14	15	16	17	Rank	Points
2013	Juncos Racing	AUS; 10	AUS; 10	STP	STP	IND	IOW	TOR	TOR	MOS	MOS	MOH; 10	MOH; 10	TRO	TRO	HOU	HOU		-	0
2014	Juncos Racing	STP; 20	STP; 9	BAR; 9	BAR; 9	IMS; 7	IMS; 3	LOR; 9	HOU; 7	HOU; 8	MOH; 5	MOH; 4	MIL; 9	SON; 11	SON; 1				7th	201
2015	Juncos Racing	STP; 5	STP; 2	LOU; 8	LOU; C	BAR; 16	BAR; 16	IMS; 12	IMS; 7	IMS; 4	LOR; 5	TOR; 16	TOR; 5	IOW; 6	MOH; 12	MOH; 10	LAG; 4	LAG; 8	9th	216

=== WeatherTech SportsCar Championship results ===
(key)(Races in bold indicate pole position. Races in italics indicate fastest race lap in class. Results are overall/class)

Year	Team	Class	Car	Engine	1	2	3	4	5	6	7	8	9	10	11	Rank	Points	Ref
2016	PR1/Mathiasen Motorsports	PC	Oreca FLM09	Chevrolet LS3 6.2 L V8	DAY; 2	SEB; 2	LBH	LGA	DET	WGL; 5	MOS				PET; 1	8th	210	
2016	Starworks Motorsport	PC	Oreca FLM09	Chevrolet LS3 6.2 L V8								LIM; 7	ELK; 4	COA; 5		8th	210	
2017	PR1/Mathiasen Motorsports	P	Ligier JS P217	Gibson GK428 4.2 L V8	DAY; 9	SEB; 7	LBH	COA; 9	DET	WGL; 4	MOS	ELK; 7	LGA; 7	PET; 10		12th	167	
2018	AFS/PR1 Mathiasen Motorsports	P	Oreca 07	Gibson GK428 4.2 L V8	DAY	SEB	LBH	MOH	DET	WGL	MOS	ELK	LGA	PET; 12		56th	19	

=== 24 Hours of Le Mans results ===
Year	Team	Co-Drivers	Car	Class	Laps	Pos.	Class Pos.
2017	(Russia) G-Drive Racing	(Mexico) Memo Rojas (Japan) Ryō Hirakawa	Oreca 07-Gibson	LMP2	327	39th	17th
2018	(Russia) G-Drive Racing	(Australia) James Allen (France) Enzo Guibbert	Oreca 07-Gibson	LMP2	197	DNF	DNF

=== Complete European Le Mans Series results ===
(key)(Races in bold indicate pole position. Races in italics indicate fastest race lap in class. Results are overall/class)

Year	Team	Class	Car	Engine	1	2	3	4	5	6	DC	Points
2018	G-Drive Racing	LMP2	Oreca 07	Gibson	LEC; 6	MNZ; Ret	RBR; 13	SIL; 12	SPA	POR	19th	9
