= 2017 Monterey Grand Prix =

Sports car race

Track map of Mazda Raceway Laguna Seca

The 2017 Monterey Grand Prix was a sports car race sanctioned by the International Motor Sports Association (IMSA).The Race was held at Mazda Raceway Laguna Seca in Monterey, California on September 24, 2017. The race was the eleventh round of the 2017 IMSA SportsCar Championship.

== Background ==
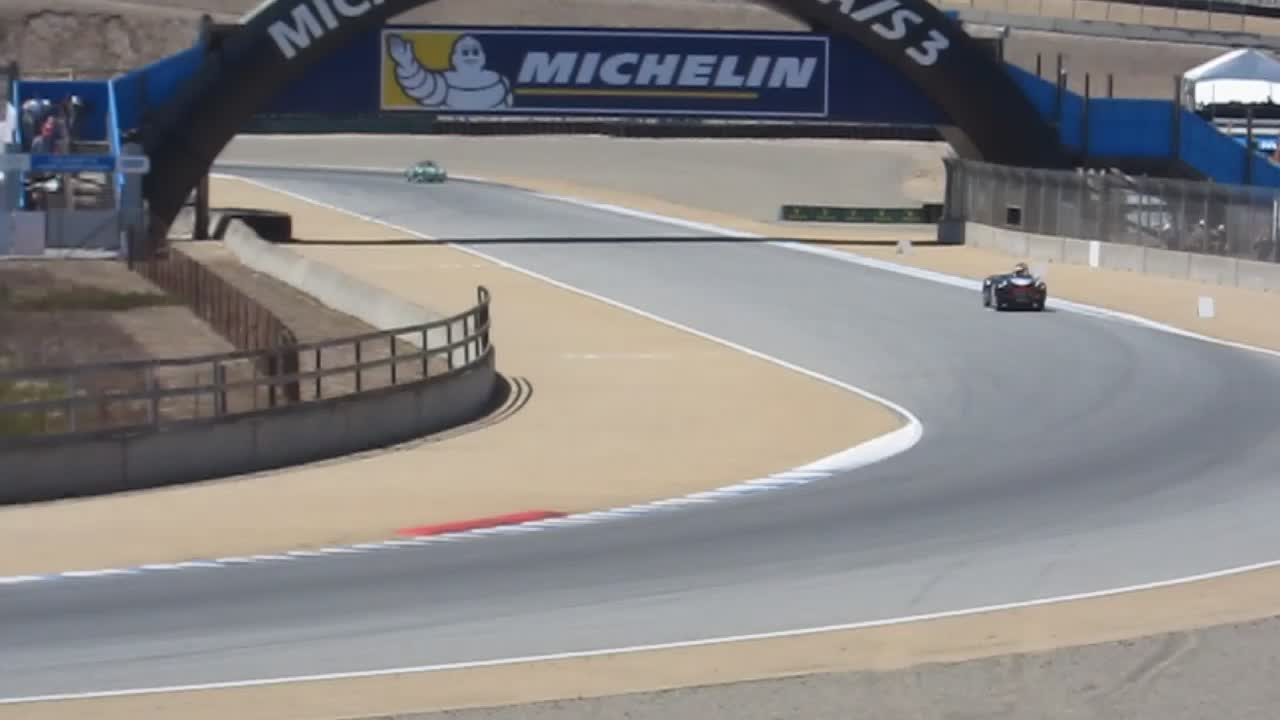
Mazda Raceway Laguna Seca, where the race was held.

IMSA's president Scott Atherton confirmed the Monterey Grand Prix was part of the series' schedule for the 2017 IMSA SportsCar Championship at Road America's victory lane in August 2016. It was the fourth consecutive year the event was held as part of the WeatherTech SportsCar Championship. The 2017 Monterey Grand Prix was the eleventh of twelve scheduled sports car races of 2017 by IMSA, and was the eighth round not held on the held as part of the North American Endurance Cup. The race was held at the eleven-turn 2.238 mi (3.602 km) Mazda Raceway Laguna Seca in Monterey County, California on September 24, 2017. After wrapping up the two "West Coast Swing" rounds also consisting of Long Beach in previous years, Laguna Seca moved to September and swapped places on the calendar with Circuit of the Americas. The event also returned to a single race format after utilizing a split race format the previous year due to the field size. For the first time since the 2009 running of the event, the PC class would not be competing.

After the Michelin GT Challenge at VIR four weeks earlier, Jordan Taylor and Ricky Taylor led the Prototype Drivers' Championship with 258 points, ahead of João Barbosa and Christian Fittipaldi with 232 points, and Dane Cameron and Eric Curran with 227 points. Antonio García and Jan Magnussen led the GTLM Drivers' Championship with 274 points, ahead of Bill Auberlen and Alexander Sims with 258 points. In GTD, the Drivers' Championship was led by Alessandro Balzan and Christina Nielsen with 282 points, ahead of Jeroen Bleekemolen with 269 points. Cadillac, Chevrolet, and Mercedes-AMG were leading their respective Manufacturers' Championships, while Wayne Taylor Racing, Corvette Racing, and Scuderia Corsa each led their own Teams' Championships.

On September 19, 2017, IMSA released the latest technical bulletin outlining Balance of performance for the event. In P, the Nissan Onroak DPi received a reduction in turbo boost and a fuel capacity reduction of 1 liter. The Cadillac DPi-V.R received an increase in the cars minimum rear wing angle as well as a fuel restrictor reduction of 1 mm. In GTLM, the Porsche 911 RSR received a 0.6 mm larger air restrictor, 1 extra liter of fuel capacity, and a 0.5 mm larger fuel restrictor. The BMW M6 GTLM received a fuel restrictor reduction of 1 mm while the Chevrolet Corvette C7.R got a fuel restrictor increase of 0.5 mm. In GTD, the Audi R8 LMS and Acura NSX GT3 received fuel restrictor increases of 1mm and 0.5 mm, respectively. The BMW M6 GT3 and Lexus RC F GT3 received fuel capacity increases of 6 and 7 liters, respectively.

On September 20, 2017, Continental Tire announced their exit from IMSA after the 2018 season. Following the announcement, IMSA announced Michelin would replace Continental Tire as their official tire supplier beginning in 2019.

== Entries ==
A total of 33 cars took part in the event split across 4 classes. 8 cars were entered in P, 9 in GTLM, and 16 in GTD. In GTD, Ben Keating returned to the #33 Riley Motorsports - Team AMG entry. No changes happened in P and GTLM.

== Practice ==
There were three practice sessions preceding the start of the race on Sunday, two on Friday and one on Saturday. The first two one-hour sessions were on Friday morning and afternoon. The third on Saturday morning lasted an hour.

=== Practice 1 ===
The first practice session took place at 10:00 am PT on Friday and ended with Jordan Taylor topping the charts for VisitFlorida Racing, with a lap time of 1:18.462. The GTLM class was topped by the #67 Ford Chip Ganassi Racing Ford GT of Ryan Briscoe with a time of 1:23.344. Patrick Long set the fastest time in GTD.

Pos.	Class	No.	Team	Driver	Time	Gap
1	P	10	Wayne Taylor Racing	Jordan Taylor	1:18.462	_
2	P	2	Tequila Patrón ESM	Ryan Dalziel	1:18.628	+0.166
3	P	90	VisitFlorida Racing	Renger van der Zande	1:19.045	+0.583

=== Practice 2 ===
The second practice session took place at 2:50 pm PT on Friday and ended with Ryan Dalziel topping the charts for Tequila Patrón ESM, with a lap time of 1:18.026. The GTLM class was topped by the #62 Risi Competizione Ferrari 488 GTE of Toni Vilander with a time of 1:22.635. Alexander Sims was second in the #25 BMW Team RLL entry and Oliver Gavin rounded out the top 3. Oswaldo Negri Jr. was fastest in GTD.

Pos.	Class	No.	Team	Driver	Time	Gap
1	P	2	Tequila Patrón ESM	Ryan Dalziel	1:18.026	_
2	P	10	Wayne Taylor Racing	Ricky Taylor	1:18.112	+0.086
3	P	22	Tequila Patrón ESM	Pipo Derani	1:18.449	+0.423

=== Practice 3 ===
The third and final practice session took place at 8:00 am PT on Saturday and ended with Jordan Taylor topping the charts for Wayne Taylor Racing, with a lap time of 1:18.216. The GTLM class was topped by the #66 Ford Chip Ganassi Racing Ford GT of Dirk Müller with a time of 1:22.678. Bryan Sellers was fastest in GTD with a time of 1:24.711.

Pos.	Class	No.	Team	Driver	Time	Gap
1	P	10	Wayne Taylor Racing	Jordan Taylor	1:18.216	_
2	P	52	PR1/Mathiasen Motorsports	José Gutiérrez	1:18.285	+0.069
3	P	2	Tequila Patrón ESM	Ryan Dalziel	1:18.294	+0.078

== Qualifying ==
Saturday afternoon's 65-minute three-group qualifying, each category had separate 15-minute sessions. Regulations stipulated that teams nominate one qualifying driver, with the fastest laps determining each class' starting order. IMSA then arranged the grid to put Prototypes ahead of the GTLM and GTD cars.

The first was for cars in GTD class. Madison Snow qualified on pole for the class driving the #48 car for Paul Miller Racing, besting Daniel Morad in the Alegra Motorsports entry.

The second session of qualifying was for cars in the GTLM class. Toni Vilander qualified on pole driving the #62 car for Risi Competizione, beating Dirk Müller in the #66 entry Ford Chip Ganassi Racing by over two tenths of a second.

The final session of qualifying was for the P class. Ricky Taylor qualified on pole driving the #10 car for Wayne Taylor Racing, beating Christian Fittipaldi in the #5 entry from Mustang Sampling Racing.

=== Qualifying results ===
Pole positions in each class are indicated in bold and by ‡.

Pos.	Class	No.	Team	Driver	Time	Gap	Grid
1	**P**	**10**	**(United States) Wayne Taylor Racing**	**(United States) Ricky Taylor**	**1:16.853**	**_**	1‡
2	P	5	(United States) Mustang Sampling Racing	(Brazil) Christian Fittipaldi	1:17.682	+0.829	2
3	P	90	(United States) VisitFlorida Racing	(Belgium) Marc Goossens	1:17.730	+0.877	3
4	P	31	(United States) Whelen Engineering Racing	(United States) Eric Curran	1:17.809	+0.956	4
5	P	52	(United States) PR1/Mathiasen Motorsports	(Mexico) José Gutiérrez	1:17.822	+0.969	5
6	P	2	(United States) Tequila Patrón ESM	(United States) Scott Sharp	1:17.998	+1.145	6
7	P	22	(United States) Tequila Patrón ESM	(United States) Johannes van Overbeek	1:18.039	+1.186	7
8	P	85	(United States) JDC-Miller MotorSports	(Canada) Mikhail Goikhberg	1:18.646	+1.793	8
9	**GTLM**	**62**	**(United States) Risi Competizione**	**(Finland) Toni Vilander**	**1:21.914**	**+5.061**	9‡
10	GTLM	66	(United States) Ford Chip Ganassi Racing	(Germany) Dirk Müller	1:22.156	+5.303	10
11	GTLM	24	(United States) BMW Team RLL	(United States) John Edwards	1:22.177	+5.324	11
12	GTLM	25	(United States) BMW Team RLL	(United Kingdom) Alexander Sims	1:22.178	+5.325	12
13	GTLM	67	(United States) Ford Chip Ganassi Racing	(Australia) Ryan Briscoe	1:22.580	+5.727	13
14	GTLM	911	(United States) Porsche GT Team	(France) Patrick Pilet	1:22.756	+5.903	14
15	GTLM	3	(United States) Corvette Racing	(Denmark) Jan Magnussen	1:22.789	+5.936	15
16	GTLM	912	(United States) Porsche GT Team	(Belgium) Laurens Vanthoor	1:22.840	+5.987	16
17	GTLM	4	(United States) Corvette Racing	(United Kingdom) Oliver Gavin	1:23.009	+6.156	17
18	**GTD**	**48**	**(United States) Paul Miller Racing**	**(United States) Madison Snow**	**1:24.469**	**+7.616**	18‡
19	GTD	28	(United States) Alegra Motorsports	(Canada) Daniel Morad	1:24.721	+7.868	19
20	GTD	73	(United States) Park Place Motorsports	(United States) Patrick Lindsey	1:24.954	+8.101	20
21	GTD	96	(United States) Turner Motorsport	(Germany) Jens Klingmann	1:25.086	+8.233	21
22	GTD	14	(United States) 3GT Racing	(United States) Sage Karam	1:25.394	+8.541	22
23	GTD	16	(United States) Change Racing	(United States) Corey Lewis	1:25.499	+8.646	23
24	GTD	86	(United States) Michael Shank Racing with Curb-Agajanian	(Brazil) Oswaldo Negri Jr.	1:25.518	+8.665	24
25	GTD	15	(United States) 3GT Racing	(United States) Scott Pruett	1:25.533	+8.680	25
26	GTD	63	(United States) Scuderia Corsa	(Denmark) Christina Nielsen	1:25.603	+8.750	26
27	GTD	50	(United States) Riley Motorsports - WeatherTech Racing	(United States) Cooper MacNeil	1:25.643	+8.790	27
28	GTD	93	(United States) Michael Shank Racing with Curb-Agajanian	(United Kingdom) Katherine Legge	1:25.800	+8.947	28
29	GTD	57	(United States) Stevenson Motorsports	(United States) Andrew Davis	1:25.832	+8.979	29
30	GTD	33	(United States) Riley Motorsports - Team AMG	(United States) Ben Keating	1:26.260	+9.407	30
31	GTD	54	(United States) CORE Autosport	(United States) Jon Bennett	1:27.304	+10.541	31
32	GTD	80	(United States) Lone Star Racing	(United States) Dan Knox	1:27.325	+10.472	32
33	GTD	75	(United States) SunEnergy1 Racing	(Australia) Kenny Habul	1:27.447	+10.594	33^{1}
Sources:

- ^{1} The No. 75 SunEnergy1 Racing entry was moved to the back of the GTD field as per Article 43.6 of the Sporting regulations (Change of starting tires).

== Race ==
=== Post-race ===
The result kept Jordan Taylor and Ricky Taylor atop the Prototype Drivers' Championship with 288 points, 29 points ahead of second-place finishers Cameron and Curran. Barbosa and Fittipaldi dropped from second to third in the standings. In the GTLM Drivers' Championship, Briscoe and Westbrook advanced from fourth to second. Hand and Müller dropped from third to fourth. As a result of winning the race, Balzan and Nielsen extended their points lead to twenty-six points ahead of Bleekemolen in the GTD Drivers' Championship. Lally and Legge advanced from seventh to fourth while Aschenbach and Davis dropped from fourth to sixth. Cadillac and Chevrolet continued to top their respective Manufacturers' Championships. Ferrari took the lead of the GTD Manufactures' Championship while Wayne Taylor Racing, Corvette Racing, and Scuderia Corsa kept their respective advantages in the Teams' Championships with one round left in the season.

=== Results ===
Class winners are denoted in bold and ‡.

Final race classification
Pos	Class	No.	Team	Drivers	Chassis	Tire	Laps	Time/Retired
Pos	Class	No.	Team	Drivers	Engine	Tire	Laps	Time/Retired
1	**P**	**90**	**(United States) VisitFlorida Racing**	**(Belgium) Marc Goossens (Netherlands) Renger van der Zande**	**Ligier JS P217**	C	**114**	**2:41.04.538‡**
1	**P**	**90**	**(United States) VisitFlorida Racing**	**(Belgium) Marc Goossens (Netherlands) Renger van der Zande**	**Gibson GK428 4.2 L V8**	C	**114**	**2:41.04.538‡**
2	P	31	(United States) Whelen Engineering Racing	(United States) Dane Cameron (United States) Eric Curran	Cadillac DPi-V.R	C	114	+2.248
2	P	31	(United States) Whelen Engineering Racing	(United States) Dane Cameron (United States) Eric Curran	Cadillac 6.2 L V8	C	114	+2.248
3	P	10	(United States) Wayne Taylor Racing	(United States) Ricky Taylor (United States) Jordan Taylor	Cadillac DPi-V.R	C	114	+8.391
3	P	10	(United States) Wayne Taylor Racing	(United States) Ricky Taylor (United States) Jordan Taylor	Cadillac 6.2 L V8	C	114	+8.391
4	P	85	(United States) JDC-Miller MotorSports	(Canada) Mikhail Goikhberg (South Africa) Stephen Simpson	Oreca 07	C	114	+9.321
4	P	85	(United States) JDC-Miller MotorSports	(Canada) Mikhail Goikhberg (South Africa) Stephen Simpson	Gibson GK428 4.2 L V8	C	114	+9.321
5	P	5	(United States) Mustang Sampling Racing	(Portugal) João Barbosa (Brazil) Christian Fittipaldi	Cadillac DPi-V.R	C	114	+10.411
5	P	5	(United States) Mustang Sampling Racing	(Portugal) João Barbosa (Brazil) Christian Fittipaldi	Cadillac 6.2 L V8	C	114	+10.411
6	P	2	(United States) Tequila Patrón ESM	(United States) Scott Sharp (United Kingdom) Ryan Dalziel	Nissan Onroak DPi	C	114	+21.241
6	P	2	(United States) Tequila Patrón ESM	(United States) Scott Sharp (United Kingdom) Ryan Dalziel	Nissan VR38DETT 3.8 L Turbo V6	C	114	+21.241
7	P	52	(United States) PR1/Mathiasen Motorsports	(France) Olivier Pla (Mexico) José Gutiérrez	Ligier JS P217	C	114	+52.076
7	P	52	(United States) PR1/Mathiasen Motorsports	(France) Olivier Pla (Mexico) José Gutiérrez	Gibson GK428 4.2 L V8	C	114	+52.076
8	P	22	(United States) Tequila Patrón ESM	(United States) Johannes van Overbeek (Brazil) Pipo Derani	Nissan Onroak DPi	C	113	+1 lap
8	P	22	(United States) Tequila Patrón ESM	(United States) Johannes van Overbeek (Brazil) Pipo Derani	Nissan VR38DETT 3.8 L Turbo V6	C	113	+1 lap
9	**GTLM**	**24**	**(United States) BMW Team RLL**	**(United States) John Edwards (Germany) Martin Tomczyk**	**BMW M6 GTLM**	M	**110**	**+4 Laps‡**
9	**GTLM**	**24**	**(United States) BMW Team RLL**	**(United States) John Edwards (Germany) Martin Tomczyk**	**BMW 4.4 L Turbo V8**	M	**110**	**+4 Laps‡**
10	GTLM	62	(United States) Risi Competizione	(Finland) Toni Vilander (Italy) Giancarlo Fisichella	Ferrari 488 GTE	M	110	+4 Laps
10	GTLM	62	(United States) Risi Competizione	(Finland) Toni Vilander (Italy) Giancarlo Fisichella	Ferrari F154CB 3.9 L Turbo V8	M	110	+4 Laps
11	GTLM	911	(United States) Porsche GT Team	(France) Patrick Pilet (Germany) Dirk Werner	Porsche 911 RSR	M	110	+4 Laps
11	GTLM	911	(United States) Porsche GT Team	(France) Patrick Pilet (Germany) Dirk Werner	Porsche 4.0 L Flat-6	M	110	+4 Laps
12	GTLM	3	(United States) Corvette Racing	(Denmark) Jan Magnussen (Spain) Antonio García	Chevrolet Corvette C7.R	M	110	+4 Laps
12	GTLM	3	(United States) Corvette Racing	(Denmark) Jan Magnussen (Spain) Antonio García	Chevrolet LT5.5 5.5 L V8	M	110	+4 Laps
13	GTLM	67	(United States) Ford Chip Ganassi Racing	(Australia) Ryan Briscoe (United Kingdom) Richard Westbrook	Ford GT	M	110	+4 Laps
13	GTLM	67	(United States) Ford Chip Ganassi Racing	(Australia) Ryan Briscoe (United Kingdom) Richard Westbrook	Ford EcoBoost 3.5 L Twin-turbo V6	M	110	+4 Laps
14	GTLM	66	(United States) Ford Chip Ganassi Racing	(Germany) Dirk Müller (United States) Joey Hand	Ford GT	M	110	+4 Laps
14	GTLM	66	(United States) Ford Chip Ganassi Racing	(Germany) Dirk Müller (United States) Joey Hand	Ford EcoBoost 3.5 L Twin-turbo V6	M	110	+4 Laps
15	GTLM	25	(United States) BMW Team RLL	(United States) Bill Auberlen (United Kingdom) Alexander Sims	BMW M6 GTLM	M	108	+6 Laps
15	GTLM	25	(United States) BMW Team RLL	(United States) Bill Auberlen (United Kingdom) Alexander Sims	BMW 4.4 L Turbo V8	M	108	+6 Laps
16	GTLM	4	(United States) Corvette Racing	(United Kingdom) Oliver Gavin (United States) Tommy Milner	Chevrolet Corvette C7.R	M	107	+7 Laps
16	GTLM	4	(United States) Corvette Racing	(United Kingdom) Oliver Gavin (United States) Tommy Milner	Chevrolet LT5.5 5.5 L V8	M	107	+7 Laps
17	GTLM	912	(United States) Porsche GT Team	(Italy) Gianmaria Bruni (Belgium) Laurens Vanthoor	Porsche 911 RSR	M	107	+7 Laps
17	GTLM	912	(United States) Porsche GT Team	(Italy) Gianmaria Bruni (Belgium) Laurens Vanthoor	Porsche 4.0 L Flat-6	M	107	+7 Laps
18	**GTD**	**63**	**(United States) Scuderia Corsa**	**(Denmark) Christina Nielsen (Italy) Alessandro Balzan**	**Ferrari 488 GT3**	C	**107**	**+7 Laps‡**
18	**GTD**	**63**	**(United States) Scuderia Corsa**	**(Denmark) Christina Nielsen (Italy) Alessandro Balzan**	**Ferrari F154CB 3.9 L Turbo V8**	C	**107**	**+7 Laps‡**
19	GTD	93	(United States) Michael Shank Racing with Curb Agajanian	(United States) Andy Lally (United Kingdom) Katherine Legge	Acura NSX GT3	C	107	+7 Laps
19	GTD	93	(United States) Michael Shank Racing with Curb Agajanian	(United States) Andy Lally (United Kingdom) Katherine Legge	Acura 3.5 L Turbo V6	C	107	+7 Laps
20	GTD	73	(United States) Park Place Motorsports	(Germany) Jörg Bergmeister (United States) Patrick Lindsey	Porsche 911 GT3 R	C	107	+7 Laps
20	GTD	73	(United States) Park Place Motorsports	(Germany) Jörg Bergmeister (United States) Patrick Lindsey	Porsche 4.0 L Flat-6	C	107	+7 Laps
21	GTD	54	(United States) CORE Autosport	(United States) Jon Bennett (United States) Colin Braun	Porsche 911 GT3 R	C	106	+8 Laps
21	GTD	54	(United States) CORE Autosport	(United States) Jon Bennett (United States) Colin Braun	Porsche 4.0 L Flat-6	C	106	+8 Laps
22	GTD	96	(United States) Turner Motorsport	(Germany) Jens Klingmann (Finland) Jesse Krohn	BMW M6 GT3	C	108	+8 Laps
22	GTD	96	(United States) Turner Motorsport	(Germany) Jens Klingmann (Finland) Jesse Krohn	BMW 4.4L Turbo V8	C	108	+8 Laps
23	GTD	50	(United States) Riley Motorsports – WeatherTech Racing	(United States) Cooper MacNeil (United States) Gunnar Jeannette	Porsche 911 GT3 R	C	108	+8 Laps
23	GTD	50	(United States) Riley Motorsports – WeatherTech Racing	(United States) Cooper MacNeil (United States) Gunnar Jeannette	Porsche 4.0 L Flat-6	C	108	+8 Laps
24	GTD	48	(United States) Paul Miller Racing	(United States) Bryan Sellers (United States) Madison Snow	Lamborghini Huracán GT3	C	108	+8 Laps
24	GTD	48	(United States) Paul Miller Racing	(United States) Bryan Sellers (United States) Madison Snow	Lamborghini 5.2 L V10	C	108	+8 Laps
25	GTD	33	(United States) Riley Motorsports – Team AMG	(Netherlands) Jeroen Bleekemolen (United States) Ben Keating	Mercedes-AMG GT3	C	108	+8 Laps
25	GTD	33	(United States) Riley Motorsports – Team AMG	(Netherlands) Jeroen Bleekemolen (United States) Ben Keating	Mercedes AMG M159 6.2 L V8	C	108	+8 Laps
26	GTD	16	(United States) Change Racing	(United States) Corey Lewis (Netherlands) Jeroen Mul	Lamborghini Huracán GT3	C	108	+8 Laps
26	GTD	16	(United States) Change Racing	(United States) Corey Lewis (Netherlands) Jeroen Mul	Lamborghini 5.2 L V10	C	108	+8 Laps
27	GTD	86	(United States) Michael Shank Racing with Curb Agajanian	(United States) Jeff Segal (Brazil) Oswaldo Negri Jr.	Acura NSX GT3	C	108	+8 Laps
27	GTD	86	(United States) Michael Shank Racing with Curb Agajanian	(United States) Jeff Segal (Brazil) Oswaldo Negri Jr.	Acura 3.5 L Turbo V6	C	108	+8 Laps
28	GTD	57	(United States) Stevenson Motorsports	(United States) Andrew Davis (United States) Lawson Aschenbach	Audi R8 LMS	C	108	+8 Laps
28	GTD	57	(United States) Stevenson Motorsports	(United States) Andrew Davis (United States) Lawson Aschenbach	Audi 5.2L V10	C	108	+8 Laps
29	GTD	75	(United States) SunEnergy1 Racing	(France) Tristan Vautier (Australia) Kenny Habul	Mercedes-AMG GT3	C	108	+8 Laps
29	GTD	75	(United States) SunEnergy1 Racing	(France) Tristan Vautier (Australia) Kenny Habul	Mercedes AMG M159 6.2 L V8	C	108	+8 Laps
30	GTD	15	(United States) 3GT Racing	(United States) Scott Pruett (United Kingdom) Jack Hawksworth	Lexus RC F GT3	C	108	+8 Laps
30	GTD	15	(United States) 3GT Racing	(United States) Scott Pruett (United Kingdom) Jack Hawksworth	Lexus 5.0L V8	C	108	+8 Laps
31	GTD	14	(United States) 3GT Racing	(United States) Robert Alon (United States) Sage Karam	Lexus RC F GT3	C	105	+9 Laps
31	GTD	14	(United States) 3GT Racing	(United States) Robert Alon (United States) Sage Karam	Lexus 5.0L V8	C	105	+9 Laps
32	GTD	80	(United States) Lone Star Racing	(United States) Dan Knox (United States) Mike Skeen	Mercedes-AMG GT3	C	105	+9 Laps
32	GTD	80	(United States) Lone Star Racing	(United States) Dan Knox (United States) Mike Skeen	Mercedes AMG M159 6.2 L V8	C	105	+9 Laps
33 DNF	GTD	28	(United States) Alegra Motorsports	(United States) Patrick Long (Canada) Daniel Morad	Porsche 911 GT3 R	C	47	Drivehsaft
33 DNF	GTD	28	(United States) Alegra Motorsports	(United States) Patrick Long (Canada) Daniel Morad	Porsche 4.0 L Flat-6	C	47	Drivehsaft

Tyre manufacturers
Key
Symbol	Tyre manufacturer
**C**	Continental
**M**	Michelin

== Standings after the race ==
Prototype Drivers' Championship standings
Pos.	+/–	Driver	Points
1		(United States) Jordan Taylor (United States) Ricky Taylor	288
2	1	(United States) Dane Cameron (United States) Eric Curran	259
3	1	(Portugal) João Barbosa (Brazil) Christian Fittipaldi	258
4		(Canada) Misha Goikhberg (South Africa) Stephen Simpson	252
5		(United Kingdom) Ryan Dalziel (United States) Scott Sharp	238

PC Drivers' Championship standings
Pos.	+/–	Driver	Points
1		(United States) James French (Mexico) Patricio O'Ward	252
2		(United States) Don Yount	212
3		(United States) Buddy Rice	150
4		(Colombia) Gustavo Yacamán	121
5		(United States) Kyle Masson	108

GTLM Drivers' Championship standings
Pos.	+/–	Driver	Points
1		(Spain) Antonio García (Denmark) Jan Magnussen	302
2	2	(Australia) Ryan Briscoe (United Kingdom) Richard Westbrook	283
3	1	(United States) Bill Auberlen (United Kingdom) Alexander Sims	282
4	1	(United States) Joey Hand (Germany) Dirk Müller	282
5		(France) Patrick Pilet (Germany) Dirk Werner	270

GTD Drivers' Championship standings
Pos.	+/–	Driver	Points
1		(Italy) Alessandro Balzan (Denmark) Christina Nielsen	318
2		(Netherlands) Jeroen Bleekemolen	292
3		(Germany) Jens Klingmann	278
4	3	(United States) Andy Lally (United Kingdom) Katherine Legge	269
5	1	(United States) Patrick Lindsey	268

- Note: Only the top five positions are included for all sets of standings.

Prototype Teams' Championship standings
Pos.	+/–	Team	Points
1		(United States) #10 Wayne Taylor Racing	258
2	1	(United States) #31 Whelen Engineering Racing	232
3	1	(United States) #5 Mustang Sampling Racing	227
4		(United States) #85 JDC-Miller MotorSports	224
5		(United States) #2 Tequila Patrón ESM	213

PC Teams' Championship standings
Pos.	+/–	Team	Points
1		(United States) #38 Performance Tech Motorsports	252
2		(United States) #26 BAR1 Motorsports	217
3		(United States) #20 BAR1 Motorsports	212
4		(United States) #8 Starworks Motorsport	58
5		(United States) #88 Starworks Motorsport	28

GTLM Teams' Championship standings
Pos.	+/–	Team	Points
1		(United States) #3 Corvette Racing	302
2	2	(United States) #66 Ford Chip Ganassi Racing	283
3	1	(United States) #25 BMW Team RLL	282
4	1	(United States) #67 Ford Chip Ganassi Racing	282
5		(United States) #911 Porsche GT Team	270

GTD Teams' Championship standings
Pos.	+/–	Team	Points
1		(United States) #63 Scuderia Corsa	318
2		(United States) #33 Riley Motorsports Team AMG	292
3		(United States) #96 Turner Motorsport	278
4	2	(United States) #93 Michael Shank Racing with Curb-Agajanian	269
5		(United States) #73 Park Place Motorsports	268

- Note: Only the top five positions are included for all sets of standings.

Prototype Manufacturers' Championship standings
Pos.	+/–	Manufacturer	Points
1		(United States) Cadillac	312
2		(Japan) Nissan	285
3		(Japan) Mazda	216

GTLM Manufacturers' Championship standings
Pos.	+/–	Manufacturer	Points
1		(United States) Chevrolet	316
2		(United States) Ford	312
3		(Germany) BMW	307
4		(Germany) Porsche	297
5		(Italy) Ferrari	174

GTD Manufacturers' Championship standings
Pos.	+/–	Manufacturer	Points
1	1	(Italy) Ferrari	327
2	1	(Germany) Mercedes-AMG	318
3		(Germany) Porsche	313
4	1	(Japan) Acura	310
5	1	(Italy) Lamborghini	305

- Note: Only the top five positions are included for all sets of standings.

IMSA SportsCar Championship
Previous race: Michelin GT Challenge at VIR	2017 season	Next race: Petit Le Mans
