= IMSA GT3 Cup Challenge Canada =

Motor racing competition

- Category: One-make racing by Porsche
- Country: Canada
- Inaugural season: 2011
- Folded: 2020
- Constructors: Porsche
- Tyre suppliers: Yokohama
- Last Drivers' champion: (Canada) Roman De Angelis (Canada) Sam Fellows
- Last Teams' champion: (Canada) Mark Motors Racing (Canada) Pfaff Motorsports
- Official website: IMSA.com GT3 Challenge Canada

The Ultra 94 Porsche GT3 Cup Challenge Canada by Yokohama was a one-make racing series based in Canada utilizing Porsche 911 GT3s.

The Ultra 94 GT3 Cup Challenge Canada by Yokohama featured semi-professional drivers racing head to head in one of the largest single-make series in North America. The multi-class structure of the series taught drivers essential skills for eventual careers in the Porsche Supercup or the American Le Mans Series (Now currently as the WeatherTech SportsCar Championship).

The series was divided into two classes; the Platinum Cup, featuring more powerful Porsche 911 GT3 Cup 991.2 cars, and the Gold Cup, which included the older 991.1 model. Both classes raced on Yokohama racing tires.

The series was sanctioned by the International Motor Sports Association, and was a development series to the WeatherTech SportsCar Championship. Randy Hembrey was the Race Director from 2013 to 2014, followed by Kyle Novak. Starting in 2018, the series Race Director was John Maesky.

The series was replaced by the Porsche Carrera Cup North America starting in 2021.

== Champions ==
| Season | Class Champion | |
| | Platinum | Gold |
|---|---|---|
| 2011 | (Canada) Perry Bortolotti | (Canada) Shaun McKaigue |
| 2012 | (Canada) Jean-Frederic Laberge | (Canada) Bruce Gregory |
| 2013 | (Canada) David Ostella | (United States) Carlos de Quesada |
| 2014 | (Canada) Scott Hargrove | (Canada) Tim Sanderson |
| 2015 | (Canada) Chris Green | (Canada) Orey Fidani |
| 2016 | (Canada) Daniel Morad | (Canada) Shaun McKaigue |
| 2017 | (Canada) Scott Hargrove | (Canada) Roman De Angelis |
| 2018 | (Canada) Zacharie Robichon | (Canada) Michel Bonnet |
| 2019 | (Canada) Roman De Angelis | (Canada) Sam Fellows |
| 2020 | Not awarded due to COVID-19 pandemic | |
