= Matias Köykkä =

Finnish racing driver

- Nationality: (Finland) Finnish
- Born: Matias Mikael Köykkä; November 23, 1994 (age 31)

F1600 Championship Series
- Years active: 2012
- Teams: Cape Motorsports w/ Wayne Taylor Racing
- Starts: 12
- Wins: 4
- Poles: 5
- Best finish: 1st in 2012

Matias Mikael Köykkä (born November 23, 1994) is a Finnish racing driver. He won the 2012 F1600 Championship Series.

== Karting career ==
Köykkä started karting when he was eight years old in the Finnish 'Raket' class. His father entered him in races until 2009. For 2009, he signed with the CRG factory team. He won the Finnish championship in the KF3 class. For 2010, he stepped up to the KF2 class and also competed in the CIK-FIA Under 18 World Championship. In the CIK-FIA Under 18 World Championship, he finished second behind Jake Dennis. In 2011, he was placed 15th in the Finnish KF2 championship. He also raced in the KF1 class.

== Formula racing ==
Köykkä made his first appearance in a racing car in 2011. He raced in the Finnish Formula Ford Junior championship in a Duratec powered Mygale SJ08 prepared by LMS Racing. In the three races he competed in, he had one win, two podium finishes and one fastest lap. He was eventually placed 10th in the championship. Teammate Antti Buri took the championship.

In 2011, Köykkä moved to Ohio where he continued to go to high school at Western Reserve Academy. For 2012 he signed with Cape Motorsports w/ Wayne Taylor Racing. During the first practice of the season, at Virginia, he was the fastest of 20 drivers. The season started smoothly for Köykkä with wins at Virginia and Lime Rock. Race 5 at New Jersey Motorsports Park was a low point. Köykkä shut off the engine while leading the race, but managed to recover to sixth position. Due to this mistake, his nearest competitor Bryan Herta Autosport driver Brandon Newey was hot on his tail. After this, Köykkä scored six podium finishes, including two wins, in the seven remaining races. This secured Köykkä of the championship placing Brandon Newey second place and Jeremy Grenier in third.
