= 2014 Pro Mazda Championship =

Seasons
- ← 2013 2015 →

The 2014 Pro Mazda Championship is the 16th season in series history.

The second season of Andersen Promotions' management of the series saw increased car counts with 20 or more cars in many races and 13 drivers competing in all 14 races compared to 2013's nine.

American Spencer Pigot won the title over Canadian Scott Hargrove in the final race weekend at Sonoma Raceway in controversial fashion. In the first race of the weekend, the two made contact on the fourth lap of the race with Pigot leading. Pigot's race was over while Hargrove went on to finish third. In the second race, Neil Alberico, Hargrove's teammate, made contact with Pigot on the first lap, although both were able to continue. On lap 12, Pigot's teammate Kyle Kaiser's car stopped on track bringing out a caution flag, allowing Pigot, who was running sixth at the time, to close up behind the leaders. After the restart, Hargrove, who was leading, began to experience mechanical trouble, and as he fell back to Pigot, made a move that forced Pigot to swerve around him. Hargrove's race was done while Pigot finished fifth and captured the title by 11 points. Pigot captured six race wins in the fourteen races, including the first four races of the season. With the championship Pigot won a Road to Indy scholarship to compete in Indy Lights in 2015.

Alberico finished third in points without a race win. Andretti Autosport's top challenger, Shelby Blackstock finished fourth in the championship, also without a win. Brazilian Nicolas Costa captured one win and finished fifth in points. Other race winners were Kaiser, Jose Guttierez, who won the wild Sonoma race 2, and Garett Grist who captured two wins but was inconsistent.

American Bobby Eberle captured the Expert Class championship for drivers over 35 years old largely by virtue of entering the most races among such entrants.

== Drivers and teams ==
All teams are American-registered.

Team	No.	Drivers	Notes
Andretti Autosport	27	(Canada) Garett Grist	
Andretti Autosport	28	(United States) Shelby Blackstock	
Cape Motorsports w/ Wayne Taylor Racing	2	(United States) Neil Alberico	
Cape Motorsports w/ Wayne Taylor Racing	3	(Canada) Scott Hargrove	
HAVOC Motorsport	21	(United States) Brian Lift	Mid-Ohio only
JDC MotorSports	11	(Italy) Vicky Piria	St. Pete & Barber only
JDC MotorSports	19	(United States) Ryan Booth	
JDC MotorSports	54	(United States) Michael Johnson	
JDC MotorSports	91	(United States) Kyle Connery	Skipped LOR, Houston & Sonoma
JDC MotorSports	91	(United States) Clark Toppe	Houston only
Juncos Racing	5	(Mexico) Jose Gutierrez	
Juncos Racing	6	(Argentina) Julia Ballario	
Juncos Racing	7	(United States) Spencer Pigot	
Juncos Racing	18	(United States) Kyle Kaiser	
M1 Racing	9	(Brazil) Felipe Donato	Houston, Mid-Ohio & Sonoma only
M1 Racing	23	(Puerto Rico) Carlos Conde	Mid-Ohio & Sonoma only
M1 Racing	26	(United States) Parker Nicklin	Sonoma only
M1 Racing	29	(United States) Jason Rabe	IMS only
M1 Racing	37	(United States) Jay Horak	St. Pete through IMS, Mid-Ohio
M1 Racing	62	(Jamaica) Jason Bedasse	St. Pete only
M1 Racing	99	(Brazil) Nicolas Costa	St. Pete through IMS
Team Pelfrey	80	(Canada) Dalton Kellett	
Team Pelfrey	81	(Brazil) Pipo Derani	St. Pete through IMS
Team Pelfrey	81	(Norway) Anders Krohn	LOR only
Team Pelfrey	81	(United Kingdom) Jack Aitken	Sonoma only
Team Pelfrey	81	(United States) Brandon Newey	Mid-Ohio only
Team Pelfrey	82	(United States) Brandon Newey	St. Pete through IMS
Team Pelfrey	82	(Brazil) Nicolas Costa	Houston onwards
Team Pelfrey	99	(Brazil) Nicolas Costa	LOR only
World Speed Motorsports	8	(United States) Stan Kohls	Sonoma only
World Speed Motorsports	13	(United States) Bobby Eberle	Skipped LOR & Milwaukee
World Speed Motorsports	14	(United States) Jeff Harrison	Barber & Houston only
World Speed Motorsports	16	(Philippines) Michele Bumgarner	Skipped Mid-Ohio & Milwaukee
World Speed Motorsports	34	(United States) Joey Bickers	Sonoma only
World Speed Motorsports	61	(United States) Alex Keyes	Sonoma only

== Race calendar and results ==
The series schedule, along with the other Road to Indy series, was announced on October 24, 2013. Unlike previous seasons, all races were in support of the IndyCar Series except the race at Lucas Oil Raceway (lower tiers of INDYCAR race at Lucas Oil Raceway to gain oval experience at shorter tracks). All road and street course race weekends were double-headers. All races were held in the United States.

Rnd	Circuit	Location	Date	Pole position	Fastest lap	Most laps led	Winning driver	Winning team
1	Streets of St. Petersburg	St. Petersburg, Florida	March 29	(United States) Spencer Pigot	(United States) Spencer Pigot	(United States) Spencer Pigot	(United States) Spencer Pigot	Juncos Racing
2	Streets of St. Petersburg	St. Petersburg, Florida	March 30	(United States) Spencer Pigot	(United States) Spencer Pigot	(United States) Spencer Pigot	(United States) Spencer Pigot	Juncos Racing
3	Barber Motorsports Park	Birmingham, Alabama	April 26	(United States) Spencer Pigot	(United States) Spencer Pigot	(United States) Spencer Pigot	(United States) Spencer Pigot	Juncos Racing
4	Barber Motorsports Park	Birmingham, Alabama	April 27	(Canada) Scott Hargrove	(United States) Spencer Pigot	(United States) Spencer Pigot	(United States) Spencer Pigot	Juncos Racing
5	Indianapolis Motor Speedway road course	Speedway, Indiana	May 9	(United States) Spencer Pigot	(Canada) Scott Hargrove	(United States) Neil Alberico	(Canada) Scott Hargrove	Cape Motorsports
6	Indianapolis Motor Speedway road course	Speedway, Indiana	May 10	(United States) Spencer Pigot	(Canada) Scott Hargrove	(Canada) Scott Hargrove	(Canada) Scott Hargrove	Cape Motorsports
7	Lucas Oil Raceway at Indianapolis	Clermont, Indiana	May 24	(Canada) Garett Grist	(United States) Spencer Pigot	(Canada) Garett Grist	(Canada) Garett Grist	Andretti Autosport
8	Reliant Park	Houston, Texas	June 28	(Canada) Garett Grist	(United States) Spencer Pigot	(United States) Spencer Pigot	(Canada) Scott Hargrove	Cape Motorsports
9	Reliant Park	Houston, Texas	June 29	(Canada) Garett Grist	(United States) Neil Alberico	(United States) Spencer Pigot	(United States) Spencer Pigot	Juncos Racing
10	Mid-Ohio Sports Car Course	Lexington, Ohio	August 2	(Brazil) Nicolas Costa	(United States) Neil Alberico	(Brazil) Nicolas Costa	(Brazil) Nicolas Costa	Team Pelfrey
11	Mid-Ohio Sports Car Course	Lexington, Ohio	August 3	(Brazil) Nicolas Costa	(Brazil) Nicolas Costa	(Canada) Garett Grist	(Canada) Garett Grist	Andretti Autosport
12	Milwaukee Mile	West Allis, Wisconsin	August 16	(Mexico) José Gutiérrez	(Canada) Scott Hargrove	(Canada) Scott Hargrove (United States) Spencer Pigot	(United States) Spencer Pigot	Juncos Racing
13	Sonoma Raceway	Sonoma, California	August 22	(Canada) Scott Hargrove	(United States) Spencer Pigot	(United States) Kyle Kaiser	(United States) Kyle Kaiser	Juncos Racing
14	Sonoma Raceway	Sonoma, California	August 23	(Canada) Scott Hargrove	(Canada) Scott Hargrove	(Canada) Scott Hargrove	(Mexico) José Gutiérrez	Juncos Racing

== Championship standings ==
=== Drivers' championships ===
Pos	Driver	STP		BAR		IMS		LOR	HOU		MOH		MIL	SON		Points
Overall
1	(United States) Spencer Pigot	**1***	**1***	**1***	1*	**8**	**8**	3	9*	1*	4	6	1*	21	5	309
2	(Canada) Scott Hargrove	3	5	2	**2**	1	1*	2	1	16	6	3	2*	**3**	18	299
3	(United States) Neil Alberico	6	6	4	6	3*	2	6	17	2	7	5	4	2	12	239
4	(United States) Shelby Blackstock	10	4	5	3	2	17	7	5	3	3	19	3	5	3	235
5	(Brazil) Nicolas Costa	8	16	19	8	15	16	4	2	5	**1***	**2**	5	4	2	224
6	(United States) Kyle Kaiser	2	2	3	5	13	5	8	8	15	12	7	10	1	DSQ	211
7	(Mexico) José Gutiérrez	20	9	9	9	7	3	9	7	8	5	4	**9**	11	1	201
8	(Canada) Garett Grist	17	17	8	7	6	4	**1***	**6**	**9**	9	1*	12	15	9	199
9	(United States) Ryan Booth	7	8	7	10	17	6	10	15	4	2	12	7	8	16	173
10	(Canada) Dalton Kellett	9	11	10	11	4	19	DNS	3	7	8	8	11	7	10	160
11	(Argentina) Julia Ballario	11	7	20	14	10	7	12	4	10	15	11	6	10	8	152
12	(United States) Kyle Connery	5	12	11	17	14	10				11	9	8			93
13	(United States) Michael Johnson	15	10	12	20	11	15	11	12	12	17	14	13	18	17	90
14	(Brazil) Pipo Derani	4	3	6	4	9	18									88
15	(Philippines) Michele Bumgarner	12	13	14	15	16	13	13	13	11				12	20	79
16	(United States) Bobby Eberle	14	15	18	19	18	12		14	14	13	16		17	14	66
17	(United States) Brandon Newey	16	18	16	12	5	14				10	13				63
18	(United States) Jay Horak	13	14	17	18	12	11				18	17				48
19	(Brazil) Felipe Donato								10	DNS	16	10		20	13	36
20	(United Kingdom) Jack Aitken													9	4	31
21	(United States) Alex Keyes													6	7	29
22	(United States) Jeff Harrison			15	16				11	13						29
23	(United States) Joey Bickers													14	6	22
24	(United States) Parker Nicklin													13	11	18
25	(Norway) Anders Krohn							5								17
26	(Italy) Vicky Piria	19	DNS	13	13											17
27	(Puerto Rico) Carlos Conde										14	18		19	15	17
28	(United States) Clark Toppe								16	6						16
29	(United States) Jason Rabe					19	9									13
30	(United States) Brian Lift										19	15				7
31	(United States) Stan Kohls													16	19	6
32	(Jamaica) Jason Bedasse	18	19													4
Expert class
1	(United States) Bobby Eberle	14	15	18	19	18	12		14	14	13	16		17	14	202
2	(United States) Jay Horak	13	14	17	18	14	17				18	17				153
3	(United States) Jeff Harrison			15	16				11	13						88
4	(Puerto Rico) Carlos Conde										14	18		19	15	66
5	(United States) Stan Kohls													16	19	37
6	(United States) Jason Rabe					19	9									23
7	(Jamaica) Jason Bedasse	18	19													16
Pos	Driver	STP		BAR		IMS		LOR	HOU		MOH		MIL	SON		Points

Color	Result
Gold	Winner
Silver	2nd place
Bronze	3rd place
Green	4th & 5th place
Light Blue	6th–10th place
Dark Blue	Finished (Outside Top 10)
Purple	Did not finish
Red	Did not qualify (DNQ)
Brown	Withdrawn (Wth)
Black	Disqualified (DSQ)
White	Did not start (DNS)
Blank	Did not participate (DNP)
Blank	Not competing

**In-line notation**
**Bold**	Pole position (1 point)
Italics	Ran fastest race lap (1 point)
*	Led most race laps (1 point)

Position	1	2	3	4	5	6	7	8	9	10	11	12	13	14	15	16	17	18	19	20
Overall points	30	25	22	19	17	15	14	13	12	11	10	9	8	7	6	5	4	3	2	1

- Drivers must complete 50% race distance to score main points, otherwise 1 point is awarded.

=== Teams' championship ===
Pos	Team	Points
1	Juncos Racing	375
2	Cape Motorsports w/ Wayne Taylor Racing	346
3	Team Pelfrey	259
4	Andretti Autosport	238
5	JDC MotorSports	117
6	World Speed Motorsports	52
7	M1 Racing	45
8	HAVOC Motorsport	8
