= 2013 U.S. F2000 National Championship =

Motor racing competition

Seasons
- ← 2012 2014 →

The 2013 U.S. F2000 National Championship is a season of the U.S. F2000 National Championship, an open wheel auto racing series that is the first step in IndyCar's Road to Indy ladder. It is the fourth full season of the series since its revival in 2010.

There are two classes of competition, the premier Championship Class and the lower National Class. For this season all National Class competitors will use the Formula SCCA/FE chassis. This chassis was first allowed in the National Class in 2012. Championship Class competitors will continue to use Mazda MZR powered Van Diemen F2000 chassis with a league–specified wing package. National Class competitors were previously allowed to use Van Diemen chassis with less powerful engines than the Championship Class.

== Drivers and teams ==
Team	No.	Driver(s)	Status	Round(s)
(United States) Cape Motorsports w/ Wayne Taylor Racing	2	(United States) Neil Alberico		All
(United States) Cape Motorsports w/ Wayne Taylor Racing	3	(United Kingdom) James Fletcher		1–5
(United States) Cape Motorsports w/ Wayne Taylor Racing	32	(Netherlands) Jeroen Slaghekke		1–5
(United States) Cape Motorsports w/ Wayne Taylor Racing	38	(Canada) Scott Hargrove		All
(United States) Cape Motorsports w/ Wayne Taylor Racing	97	(Canada) Steve Bamford	U	6–7
(United States) Belardi Auto Racing	4	(Canada) Daniel Burkett		All
(United States) Belardi Auto Racing	11	(Brazil) Danilo Estrela		All
(United States) Belardi Auto Racing	14	(United States) Matt McMurry		All
(United States) Belardi Auto Racing	41	(United States) Peter Portante		All
(United States) Belardi Auto Racing	44	(United Kingdom) Michael Epps		6–14
(United States) Pabst Racing Services	5	(Canada) Dalton Kellett		All
(United States) Pabst Racing Services	21	(Canada) Jesse Lazare		All
(United States) Pabst Racing Services	23	(United States) Jason Wolfe		All
(United States) ArmsUp Motorsports	6	(United States) Tim Paul (Note: In conjunction with SMR Racing.)		All
(United States) ArmsUp Motorsports	15	(United States) Andrew Hobbs		1–5
(United States) ArmsUp Motorsports	16	(Canada) James Dayson	N	1–4, 6–12
(United States) ArmsUp Motorsports	51	(Brazil) Felipe Donato		All
(United States) Andretti Autosport	7	(Canada) Garett Grist		All
(United States) Andretti Autosport	8	(United States) Luca Forgeois		8–10
(United States) Andretti Autosport	77	(United States) Austin Cindric		All
(United States) ZSports w/ Team E Racing	10	(United States) R. C. Enerson		All
(United States) ZSports w/ Team E Racing	20	(United States) Luca Forgeois		1–4
(United States) JDC Motorsports	12	(Brazil) Arthur Oliveira		1–4, 6–10
(United States) JDC Motorsports	19	(United States) Clark Toppe		All
(United States) JDC Motorsports	54	(United States) Michael Johnson		All
(United States) JDC Motorsports	93	(Canada) Stefan Rzadzinski		1–10
(United States) JDC Motorsports	93	(Australia) Scott Andrews	U	11–14
(United States) Afterburner Autosport	17	(United States) Wyatt Gooden		All
(United States) Afterburner Autosport	18	(United States) Jake Eidson		1–4
(United States) Afterburner Autosport	18	(Netherlands) Jeroen Slaghekke		6–10
(United States) Afterburner Autosport	18	(France) Alexandre Baron	U	11–14
(United States) Afterburner Autosport	98	(United States) Brandon Newey		1–10, 13–14
(United States) Alliance Autosport	25	(Canada) Ryan Verra	N	1–4, 6–14
(United States) Alliance Autosport	71	(United States) Scott Rettich	N	1–4, 6–10, 13–14
(United States) PRL Motorsports	30	(United Kingdom) Michael Epps		1–4
(United States) PRL Motorsports	96	(Norway) Henrik Furuseth		All
(Canada) Britain West Motorsports	64	(Canada) Sergio Pasian	U	6–7
(United States) JAY Motorsports	91	(France) Florian Latorre		All

Icon	Legend
N	National Class
U	Unregistered drivers

== Schedule ==
The race schedule was announced on October 23, 2012. Fourteen races were announced, with the possibility of up to sixteen races from adding another race to the already scheduled race meets at Sebring and Laguna Seca. Laguna Seca, Reliant Park, and Toronto are all new venues for 2013.

Icon	Legend
O	Oval/Speedway
R	Road course
S	Street circuit

Rd.	Date	Race name	Track	Location	Supporting
1	March 14–15	support event for the Mobil 1 Twelve Hours of Sebring	R Sebring International Raceway	Sebring, Florida	ALMS
2	March 14–15	support event for the Mobil 1 Twelve Hours of Sebring	R Sebring International Raceway	Sebring, Florida	ALMS
3	March 23–24	Peninsula Pipeline Grand Prix of St. Petersburg	S Streets of St. Petersburg	St. Petersburg, Florida	IndyCar Series
4	March 23–24	Peninsula Pipeline Grand Prix of St. Petersburg	S Streets of St. Petersburg	St. Petersburg, Florida	IndyCar Series
5	May 25	Night Before the 500	O Lucas Oil Raceway	Clermont, Indiana	USAC Midgets
6	July 13–14	Analytic Systems USF2000 Grand Prix of Toronto	S Streets of Toronto	Toronto, Ontario	IndyCar Series
7	July 13–14	Analytic Systems USF2000 Grand Prix of Toronto	S Streets of Toronto	Toronto, Ontario	IndyCar Series
8	August 3–4	USF2000 Grand Prix of Mid-Ohio	R Mid–Ohio Sports Car Course	Lexington, Ohio	IndyCar Series
9	August 3–4	USF2000 Grand Prix of Mid-Ohio	R Mid–Ohio Sports Car Course	Lexington, Ohio	IndyCar Series
10	August 3–4	USF2000 Grand Prix of Mid-Ohio	R Mid–Ohio Sports Car Course	Lexington, Ohio	IndyCar Series
11	September 7–8	Allied Building Products Grand Prix at Mazda Raceway Laguna Seca	R Mazda Raceway Laguna Seca	Monterey, California	Rolex Sports Car Series
12	September 7–8	Allied Building Products Grand Prix at Mazda Raceway Laguna Seca	R Mazda Raceway Laguna Seca	Monterey, California	Rolex Sports Car Series
13	October 5–6	Marlin CNG Services Grand Prix of Houston	S Reliant Park	Houston, Texas	IndyCar Series
14	October 5–6	Marlin CNG Services Grand Prix of Houston	S Reliant Park	Houston, Texas	IndyCar Series

== Race results ==
Rd.	Track	Pole position	Fastest lap	Most laps led	Race winner	
Rd.	Track	Pole position	Fastest lap	Most laps led	Driver	Team
1	Sebring International Raceway	(Canada) Scott Hargrove	(Canada) Scott Hargrove	(Canada) Scott Hargrove	(Canada) Scott Hargrove	(United States) Cape Motorsports with WTR
2	Sebring International Raceway		(United States) Neil Alberico	(United States) Neil Alberico	(United States) Neil Alberico	(United States) Cape Motorsports with WTR
3	Streets of St. Petersburg	(Canada) Scott Hargrove	(Brazil) Danilo Estrela	(Canada) Scott Hargrove	(Canada) Scott Hargrove	(United States) Cape Motorsports with WTR
4	Streets of St. Petersburg		(Canada) Scott Hargrove	(Canada) Scott Hargrove	(Canada) Scott Hargrove	(United States) Cape Motorsports with WTR
5	Lucas Oil Raceway at Indianapolis	(Canada) Scott Hargrove	(Canada) Scott Hargrove	(United States) Neil Alberico	(United States) Neil Alberico	(United States) Cape Motorsports with WTR
6	Streets of Toronto	(United States) Neil Alberico	(United States) Neil Alberico	(United States) Neil Alberico	(United States) Neil Alberico	(United States) Cape Motorsports with WTR
7	Streets of Toronto		(Canada) Scott Hargrove	(United States) Neil Alberico	(Brazil) Danilo Estrela	(United States) Belardi Auto Racing
8	Mid–Ohio Sports Car Course	(United States) Neil Alberico	(United States) Neil Alberico	(United States) Neil Alberico	(United States) Neil Alberico	(United States) Cape Motorsports with WTR
9	Mid–Ohio Sports Car Course		(Canada) Garett Grist	(United States) Neil Alberico	(United States) Neil Alberico	(United States) Cape Motorsports with WTR
10	Mid–Ohio Sports Car Course		(Canada) Garett Grist	(Canada) Garett Grist	(Canada) Garett Grist	(United States) Andretti Autosport
11	Mazda Raceway Laguna Seca	(France) Alexandre Baron	(France) Alexandre Baron	(France) Alexandre Baron	(France) Alexandre Baron	(United States) Afterburner Autosport
12	Mazda Raceway Laguna Seca		(Canada) Scott Hargrove	(Canada) Scott Hargrove	(Canada) Scott Hargrove	(United States) Cape Motorsports with WTR
13	Reliant Park	(Canada) Scott Hargrove	(Norway) Henrik Furuseth	(Canada) Scott Hargrove	(United States) Neil Alberico	(United States) Cape Motorsports with WTR
14	Reliant Park		(France) Alexandre Baron	(France) Alexandre Baron	(France) Alexandre Baron	(United States) Afterburner Autosport

== Championship standings ==
=== Drivers' Championships ===
Pos	Driver	SEB		STP		LOR	TOR		MOH			LAG		HOU		Points
Championship Class
1	(Canada) Scott Hargrove	**1***	2	**1***	1*	**5**	15	2	17	2	2	11	1*	**3***	21	294
2	(United States) Neil Alberico	31	1*	29	20	1*	**1***	5*	**1***	1	28	2	4	1	3	277
3	(Canada) Garett Grist	2	5	22	6	2	22	6	27	5	1*	4	2	6	16	215
4	(Norway) Henrik Furuseth	10	8	11	10	6	4	21	7	6	4	DNS	11	2	2	189
5	(United States) Wyatt Gooden	7	6	2	2	12	24	12	9	14	8	3	6	4	22	187
6	(France) Florian Latorre	4	30	5	9	15	2	3	4	7	22	7	7	21	10	176
7	(Brazil) Danilo Estrela	3	3	21	4	4	3	1	25	27	23	22	15	23	4	165
8	(United States) Jason Wolfe	8	7	7	7	7	29	24	3	9	20	9	8	7	18	148
9	(United States) R. C. Enerson	30	18	8	12	DNS	5	20	2	4	3	12	10	20	9	143
10	(United States) Peter Portante	13	31	10	13	3	11	4	11	3	18	23	12	19	6	139
11	(Canada) Jesse Lazare	11	4	4	3	11	16	18	10	10	21	8	14			131
12	(United States) Brandon Newey	12	10	6	5	16	12	10	23	16	6			10	5	126
13	(United Kingdom) Michael Epps	15	11	30	15		6	8	5	12	7	5	23	12	20	126
14	(Canada) Stefan Rzadzinski	5	9	3	11	10	9	27	14	13	11					110
15	(Canada) Daniel Burkett	22	28	27	14	9	10	11	13	21	25	10	5	9	8	106
16	(Canada) Dalton Kellett	17	13	28	18	8	7	9	6	11	24	16	22	13	14	102
17	(United States) Austin Cindric	24	29	23	28	22	27	13	12	15	9	20	13	8	7	77
18	(Brazil) Felipe Donato	19	25	9	17	13	8	7	28	18	5	19	DNS			76
19	(United States) Michael Johnson	16	17	14	21	18	18	15	19	17	26	13	17	12	12	66
20	(United States) Clark Toppe	14	31	25	16	19	25	22	20	22	12	14	16	11	11	61
21	(United States) Matt McMurry	23	19	13	19	20	13	29	24	19	10	21	18	15	15	53
22	(Netherlands) Jeroen Slaghekke	9	12	20	24	14	26	28	16	8	19					51
23	(United States) Tim Paul	21	15	17	26	23	19	16	15	26	27	15	20	14	DNS	42
24	(United States) Luca Forgeois	18	16	26	27		DNS	DNS	8	28	14					31
25	(Brazil) Arthur Oliveira	20	14	24	DNS		14	25	18	20	13					29
26	(United States) Jake Eidson	6	24	12	23											26
27	(United Kingdom) James Fletcher	29	26	16	8	17										24
28	(United States) Andrew Hobbs	25	20	DNS	DNS	21										3
Unregistered drivers
	(France) Alexandre Baron											**1***	3	18	1*	
	(Australia) Scott Andrews											6	9	22	17	
	(Canada) Steve Bamford						17	14								
	(Canada) Sergio Pasian						28	24								
National Class
1	(United States) Scott Rettich	26	21	15	22		20	17	21	23	15			16	13	242
2	(Canada) Ryan Verra	28	23	19	DNS		21	26	26	24	17	17	19	17	19	206
3	(Canada) James Dayson	27	22	18	25		23	19	22	25	16	18	21			192
Pos	Driver	SEB		STP		LOR	TOR		MOH			LAG		HOU		Points

Color	Result
Gold	Winner
Silver	2nd place
Bronze	3rd place
Green	4th & 5th place
Light Blue	6th–10th place
Dark Blue	Finished (Outside Top 10)
Purple	Did not finish
Red	Did not qualify (DNQ)
Brown	Withdrawn (Wth)
Black	Disqualified (DSQ)
White	Did not start (DNS)
Blank	Did not participate

**In–line notation** Championship Class only
**Bold**	Pole position (1 point)
Italics	Ran fastest race lap (1 point)
*	Led most race laps (1 point); Not awarded if more than one driver leads most laps

=== Teams' ===
Pos	Team	Points
1	(United States) Cape Motorsports w/ Wayne Taylor Racing	386
2	(United States) Belardi Auto Racing	219
3	(United States) Afterburner Autosport	213
4	(United States) Andretti Autosport	162
5	(United States) Pabst Racing Services	134
6	(United States) PRL Motorsports	106
7	(United States) ZSports Midwest	74
8	(United States) JAY Motorsports	68
9	(United States) JDC Motorsports	64
10	(United States) ArmsUp Motorsports	43
11	(United States) Alliance Autosport	24
