= Henrik Furuseth =

Norwegian racing driver (born 1996)

- Nationality: (Norway) Norwegian
- Born: 26 April 1996 (age 30) Eidsvoll, Akershus

U.S. F2000 National Championship career
- Debut season: 2012
- Current team: JAY Motorsports
- Car number: 96
- Former teams: PRL Motorsports; Cape Motorsports w/ Wayne Taylor Racing
- Starts: 42
- Wins: 0
- Podiums: 3
- Poles: 0
- Fastest laps: 1

Previous series
- 2010-11 2012: Formula Basic Norway; U.S. F2000 National Championship National Class

Championship titles
- 2011 2012: Formula Basic Norway; U.S. F2000 National Championship National Class

Henrik Furuseth (Eidsvoll April 24, 1996) is a Norwegian former racing driver. He won the U.S. F2000 National Championship in the National Class in 2012.

== Racing career ==
Henrik started karting when he was six years old. He raced his way through the ranks until 2010. In 2010, he made his formula racing debut in the Norwegian Formula Basic. He was ranked third in the championship in his Ford powered Van Diemen. In his second season in Formula Basic, he not only won the Norwegian championship but also the Norwegian cup.

In 2012, Furuseth made his debut in American autosport in the U.S. F2000 National Championship. Henrik raced for Cape Motorsports w/ Wayne Taylor Racing in a Mazda powered Van Diemen DP06 Formula Enterprises. He took his first win in the second race of the season at Sebring. During his debut season, he took another six wins and a total of nine podium finishes. But it took until the last round of the season to secure the championship over Mark Eaton.

For 2013, Furuseth made the switch to the Championship class in the U.S. F2000 National Championship racing for PRL Motorsports which also made its debut in the Championship class after having competed in the National class. He finished fourth in Championship class points with a pair of second-place finishes in Houston as his best finish. In 2014, he moved to JAY Motorsports and slid to tenth in points with only a single podium finish, a third place at the Mid-Ohio Sports Car Course

== Personal life ==
His older brother Sindre Furuseth is a Norwegian rally driver. Their father Vidar Furuseth is the owner of Furuseth Motorsport which runs Sindre's rally car. Anders Krohn manages and coaches Henrik Furuseth as of 2012.

== Racing results ==
=== U.S. F2000 National Championship ===
Year	Team	1	2	3	4	5	6	7	8	9	10	11	12	13	14	Rank	Points
2013	PRL Motorsports	SEB; 10	SEB; 8	STP; 11	STP; 10	LOR; 6	TOR; 4	TOR; 21	MOH; 7	MOH; 6	MOH; 4	LAG; DNS	LAG; 11	HOU; 2	HOU; 2	4th	189
2014	JAY Motorsports	STP; 8	STP; 13	BAR; 8	BAR; 9	IMS; 21	IMS; 5	LOR; 13	TOR; 18	TOR; 20	MOH; 5	MOH; 3	MOH; 10	SNM; 8	SNM; 5	10th	149
