= Garett Grist =

Canadian racing driver (born 1995)

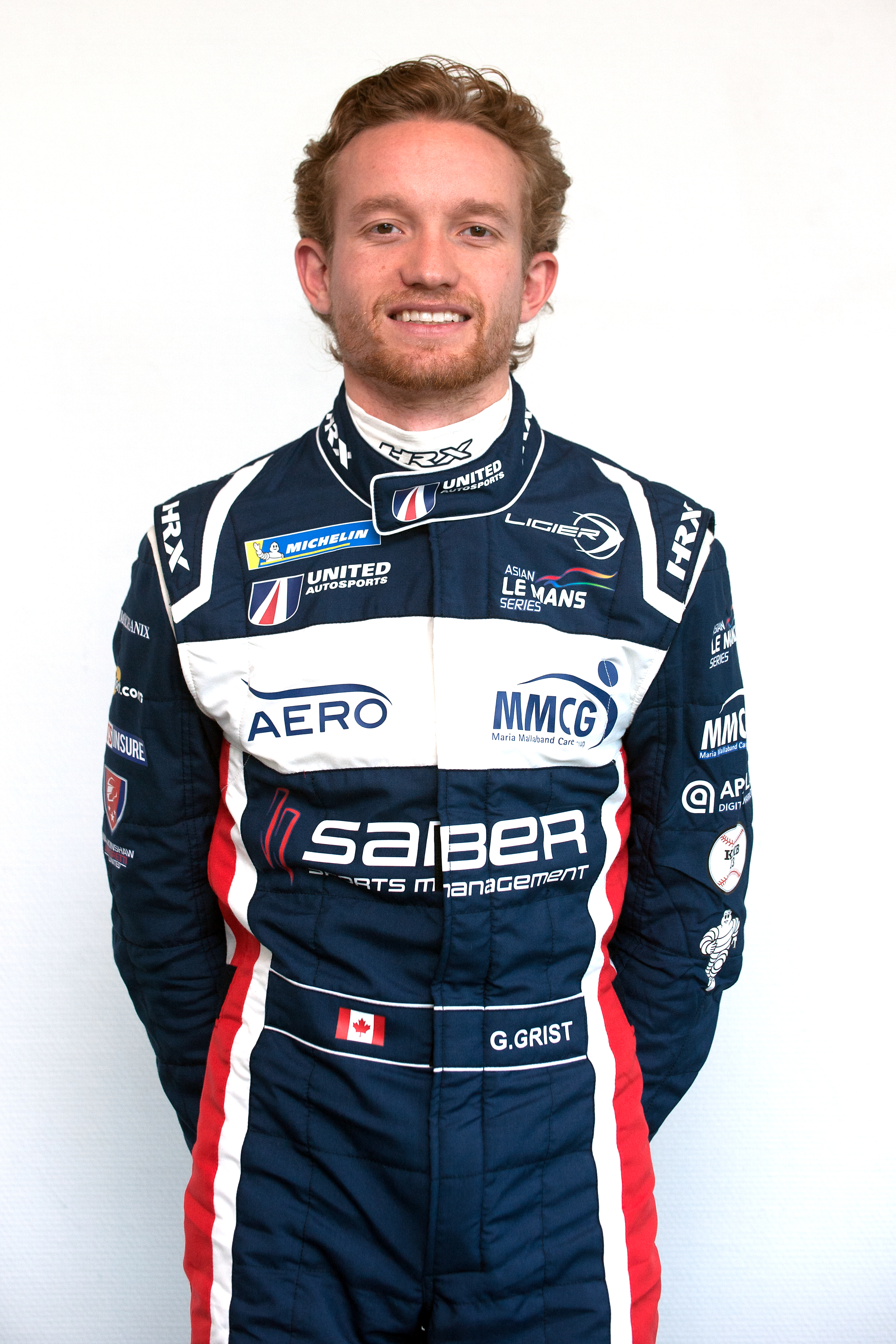
- Nationality: (Canada) Canadian
- Born: Garett Grist; May 9, 1995 (age 31) Grimsby, Ontario, Canada

WeatherTech SportsCar Championship career
- Debut season: 2017
- Current team: Jr III Motorsports
- Categorisation: FIA Silver (until 2021); FIA Gold (2022–)
- Starts: 17
- Wins: 2
- Best finish: 2nd in 2023

Previous series
- 2013 2014–2016 2016: U.S. F2000 National Championship; Pro Mazda Championship; Indy Lights

Garett Grist (born April 9, 1995 in Grimsby, Ontario, Canada) is a racing driver currently competing for Toney Driver Development in the IMSA VP Racing SportsCar Challenge.

Grist made his professional debut in the 2013 U.S. F2000 National Championship from Andretti Autosport. In 2014, he moved up the Road to Indy ladder into the Pro Mazda Championship from Andretti Autosport. He returned to the series in 2015 from Juncos Racing. He finished third in points with three wins. He returned to the team in series in 2016 but decided to move to Indy Lights with Team Pelfrey halfway through the season.

== Motorsports career results ==
=== American open–wheel racing results ===
==== U.S. F2000 National Championship ====
Year	Team	1	2	3	4	5	6	7	8	9	10	11	12	13	14	Rank	Points
2013	Andretti Autosport	SEB; 2	SEB; 5	STP; 22	STP; 6	LOR; 2	TOR; 22	TOR; 6	MOH; 27	MOH; 5	MOH; 1	LAG; 4	LAG; 2	HOU; 6	HOU; 16	**3rd**	**215**

==== Pro Mazda Championship ====
Year	Team	1	2	3	4	5	6	7	8	9	10	11	12	13	14	15	16	17	Rank	Points
2014	Andretti Autosport	STP; 17	STP; 17	BAR; 8	BAR; 7	IMS; 6	IMS; 4	LOR; 1	HOU; 6	HOU; 9	MOH; 9	MOH; 1	MIL; 12	SON; 15	SON; 9				**8th**	**199**
2015	Juncos Racing	STP; 11	STP; 6	LOU; 11	LOU; C	BAR; 7	BAR; 3	IMS; 5	IMS; 6	IMS; 8	LOR; 4	TOR; 5	TOR; 1	IOW; 11	MOH; 4	MOH; 9	LAG; 1	LAG; 1	**3rd**	**294**
2016	Juncos Racing	STP; 6	STP; 8	ALA; 3	ALA; 3	IMS; 4	IMS; 5	LOR; 2	ROA	ROA	TOR	TOR	MOH	MOH	LAG	LAG	LAG		**8th**	**133**

==== Indy Lights ====
Year	Team	1	2	3	4	5	6	7	8	9	10	11	12	13	14	15	16	17	18	Rank	Points
2016	Team Pelfrey	STP	STP	PHX	ALA	ALA	IMS	IMS	INDY	RDA; 7	RDA; 10	IOW	TOR; 7	TOR; 7	MOH; 10	MOH; 12	WGL; 8	LAG; 11	LAG; 15	15th	102

=== WeatherTech SportsCar Championship ===
Year	Entrant	Class	Chassis	Engine	1	2	3	4	5	6	7	8	Rank	Points
2017	Starworks Motorsport	PC	Oreca FLM09	GM LS3 6.2 L V8	DAY	SEB; 2	COA	DET	WAT				6th	97
2017	BAR1 Motorsports	PC	Oreca FLM09	GM LS3 6.2 L V8						MOS; 3	ELK	PET; 1	6th	97
2021	DragonSpeed USA	LMP2	Oreca 07	Gibson GK428 4.2 L V8	DAY; 10†	SEB	WGL	WGL	ELK	LGA	PET		NC†	0†
2022	Performance Tech Motorsports	LMP3	Ligier JS P320	Nissan VK56DE 5.6 L V8	DAY; 7†								3rd	1942
2022	Jr III Motorsports	LMP3	Ligier JS P320	Nissan VK56DE 5.6 L V8		SEB; 2	MOH; 2	WGL; 6	MOS; 3	ELK; 4	PET; 2		3rd	1942
2023	Jr III Motorsports	LMP3	Ligier JS P320	Nissan VK56DE 5.6 L V8	DAY	SEB; 8	WGL; 2	MOS; 2	ELK; 4	IMS; 3	PET; 1		2nd	1945

=== Complete 24 Hours of Le Mans results ===
Year	Team	Co-Drivers	Car	Class	Laps	Pos.	Class Pos.
2020	(United Kingdom) Nielsen Racing	(United Kingdom) Alex Kapadia (United Kingdom) Anthony Wells	Oreca 07-Gibson	LMP2	338	28th	16th

=== Complete Le Mans Cup results ===
(key) (Races in bold indicate pole position; results in italics indicate fastest lap)

Year	Entrant	Class	Chassis	1	2	3	4	5	6	7	Rank	Points
2025	Inter Europol Competition	LMP3 Pro-Am	Ligier JS P325	CAT; 11	LEC; 10	LMS; 1	LMS; 2	SPA	SIL	ALG	28th*	1*

* Season still in progress.
