= Neil Alberico =

American racing driver

Neil Ryan Alberico (born October 7, 1992) is an American racing driver from Los Gatos, California.

Alberico made his professional debut in the 2012 U.S. F2000 National Championship from JDC Motorsports. He returned to the series in 2013 from Cape Motorsports Wayne Taylor Racing. In 2014, he moved up the Road to Indy ladder into the Pro Mazda Championship.

Alberico is of Filipino descent.

== Motorsports career results ==
=== American open–wheel racing results ===
==== U.S. F2000 National Championship ====
| Year | Team | 1 | 2 | 3 | 4 | 5 | 6 | 7 | 8 | 9 | 10 | 11 | 12 | 13 | 14 | Rank | Points |
|---|---|---|---|---|---|---|---|---|---|---|---|---|---|---|---|---|---|
| 2012 | JDC Motorsports | SEB; 9 | SEB; 5 | STP; 17 | STP; 34 | LOR; 16 | MOH; 19 | MOH; 6 | ROA; 5 | ROA; 5 | ROA; 6 | BAL; 13 | BAL; 5 | VIR; 2 | VIR; 5 | 7th | 170 |
| 2013 | Cape Motorsports Wayne Taylor Racing | SEB; 31 | SEB; 1 | STP; 29 | STP; 20 | LOR; 1 | TOR; 1 | TOR; 5 | MOH; 1 | MOH; 1 | MOH; 28 | LAG; 2 | LAG; 4 | HOU; 1 | HOU; 3 | 2nd | 277 |

==== Pro Mazda Championship ====
| Year | Team | 1 | 2 | 3 | 4 | 5 | 6 | 7 | 8 | 9 | 10 | 11 | 12 | 13 | 14 | 15 | 16 | 17 | Rank | Points |
|---|---|---|---|---|---|---|---|---|---|---|---|---|---|---|---|---|---|---|---|---|
| 2014 | Cape Motorsports Wayne Taylor Racing | STP; 6 | STP; 6 | BAR; 4 | BAR; 6 | IMS; 3 | IMS; 2 | LOR; 6 | HOU; 17 | HOU; 2 | MOH; 7 | MOH; 5 | MIL; 4 | SON; 2 | SON; 12 | | | | 3rd | 239 |
| 2015 | Cape Motorsports Wayne Taylor Racing | STP; 1 | STP; 1 | LOU; 6 | LOU; C | BAR; 4 | BAR; 1 | IMS; 3 | IMS; 17 | IMS; 7 | LOR; 3 | TOR; 14 | TOR; 17 | IOW; 7 | MOH; 2 | MOH; 1 | LAG; 16 | LAG; 3 | 2nd | 302 |

==== Indy Lights ====
| Year | Team | 1 | 2 | 3 | 4 | 5 | 6 | 7 | 8 | 9 | 10 | 11 | 12 | 13 | 14 | 15 | 16 | 17 | 18 | Rank | Points |
|---|---|---|---|---|---|---|---|---|---|---|---|---|---|---|---|---|---|---|---|---|---|
| 2016 | Carlin | STP; 12 | STP; 15 | PHX; 9 | ALA; 12 | ALA; 14 | IMS; 11 | IMS; 13 | INDY; 7 | RDA; 11 | RDA; 11 | IOW; 11 | TOR; 12 | TOR; 8 | MOH; 12 | MOH; 8 | WGL; 5 | LAG; 6 | LAG; 10 | 11th | 193 |
| 2017 | Carlin | STP; 3 | STP; 15 | ALA; 3 | ALA; 4 | IMS; 4 | IMS; 6 | INDY; 4 | ROA; 7 | ROA; 8 | IOW; 11 | TOR; 8 | TOR; 14 | MOH; 6 | MOH; 9 | GMP; 12 | WGL; 11 | | | 8th | 225 |
| 2018 | Team Pelfrey | STP; 7 | STP; 5 | ALA | ALA | IMS | IMS | INDY | ROA | ROA | IOW | TOR | TOR | MOH | MOH | GTW | POR | POR | | 9th | 31 |

* Season still in progress
