= Grand Prix of Houston =

Defunct auto race

Shell and Pennzoil Grand Prix of Houston

IndyCar Series
- Venue: NRG Park
- Location: Houston, Texas, USA; 29°40′56″N 95°24′31″W
- Corporate sponsor: Shell, Pennzoil
- First race: 1998
- First IndyCar race: 2013
- Last race: 2014
- Distance: 151.47 mi (243.77 km)
- Laps: 90
- Previous names: Texaco Grand Prix of Houston (1998–2000); Texaco/Havoline Grand Prix of Houston (2001); Grand Prix of Houston (2006–2007)
- Most wins (driver): Sébastien Bourdais (2)
- Most wins (team): Team KOOL Green & Newman/Haas Racing (2)
- Most wins (manufacturer): Reynard (3)

Circuit information
- Surface: Asphalt/Concrete
- Length: 1.683 mi (2.709 km)
- Turns: 10
- Lap record: 58.018 ( (France) Sébastien Bourdais, Panoz DP01, 2007, Champ Car)

The Shell and Pennzoil Grand Prix of Houston Presented by the Greater Houston Honda Dealers was an annual auto race on the IndyCar Series circuit. It was held in a street circuit located in downtown Houston for four years, then returned after a four-year hiatus for two years on a course laid out in the parking lot of the Reliant/NRG Park complex. Before resuming in 2013, the last race was held on April 22, 2007, (with the IRL merger canceling the 2008 event just two months prior to the event).

== Race history ==
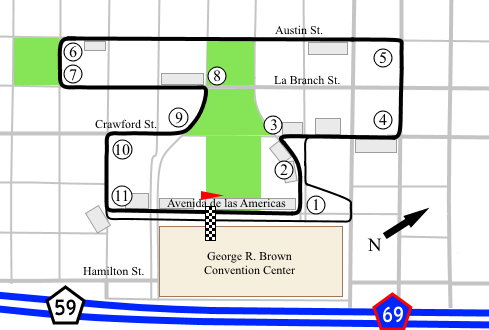
The original track layout from 1998–2001.

From 1998 to 2001, Championship Auto Racing Teams (CART) held a race on Houston's downtown streets, adjacent to the George R. Brown Convention Center. This event was sponsored by the oil company Texaco, and named the Texaco Grand Prix of Houston. However, construction in downtown Houston resulted in the race not being renewed for the 2002 CART season.

In 2005, the Champ Car World Series announced that it would be making a return to Houston in 2006; for some time, series directors had wanted to make a return to the city. The 2006 event was held on May 13 as the second round of the 2006 Champ Car schedule. However, this time the race was held on a 1.7-mile temporary street circuit on the Reliant Park complex instead of the downtown streets and was the first race held on a street course to run at night in the history of Champ Car or its precursor series (in 2003, Champ Car ran under the lights at Burke Lakefront Airport in Cleveland, Ohio). Also, the American Le Mans Series held an event, the Lone Star Grand Prix, on the previous night, marking only the second time Champ Car and American Le Mans promoted their own events in the same city on the same weekend (they joined in 2003 for the Grand Prix Americas in Miami, Florida). For 2007, JAG Flocomponents picked up the naming rights to the previously unnamed street course, naming it JAGFlo Speedway at Reliant Park.

Mi-Jack Promotions had a handshake deal with IndyCar to revive the event in October 2011, however the required sponsorship was not found by June 2010. IndyCar officials announced the event will return in 2013 sponsored by Royal Dutch Shell and using a tweaked version of the 2006–2007 course. The event had a 5-year race contract through 2017 with IndyCar and Shell, using its Pennzoil brand of motor oil, was signed for 4 years as the event's title sponsor.

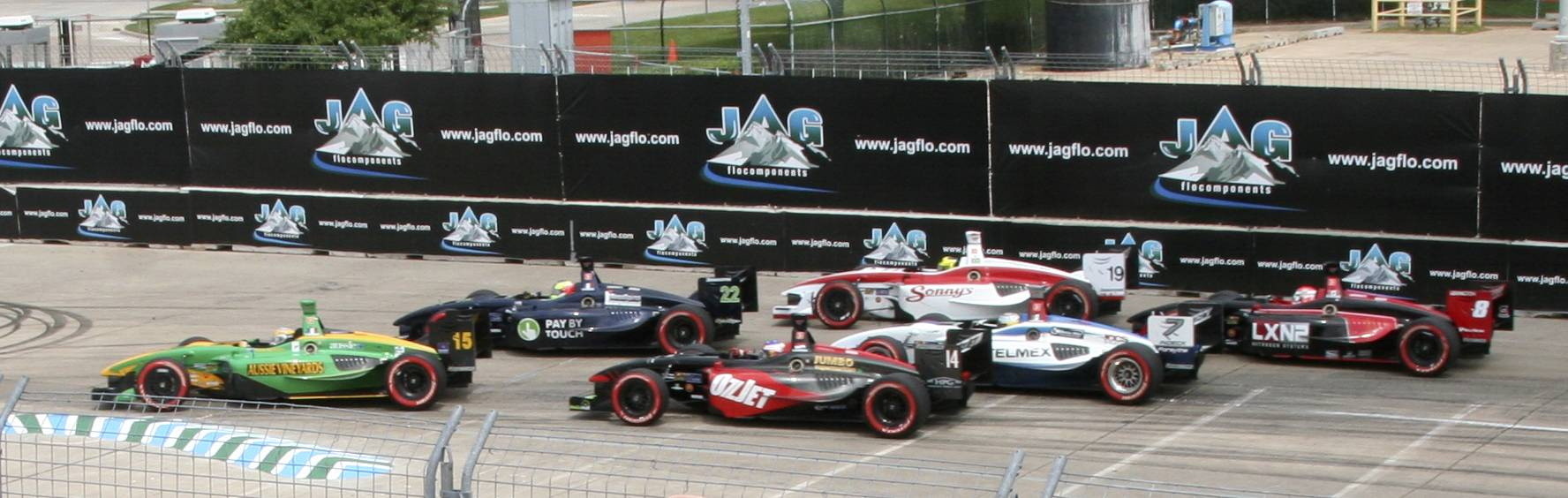
Cars approaching turn 1 during the 2007 race

On the final race lap of the 2013 event the car of Dario Franchitti was launched airborne in turn five when it made contact with the car of Takuma Sato. Franchitti's car flew into the catch-fencing, displacing a portion of the fence and sending debris into the stands, injuring 14. Franchitti suffered a broken ankle, broken back, and concussion, injuries which led him to retire from racing later that year.

IndyCar & Mi-Jack Promotions announced on August 29, 2014, that the Houston doubleheader at NRG Park had been canceled for 2015 due to scheduling issues.

== Features ==
The Champ Car paddock was located inside Reliant Arena. In 2006, the Newman/Haas, RuSPORT, Dale Coyne, and Team Australia haulers were on the northern side, while the Forsythe, Rocketsports, PKV, and CTE-HVM teams were on the southern side. The 2006 race was also the last Champ Car or IndyCar race to ever be held on a road or street course at night under the lights, the first of which was the 2003 U.S. Bank Cleveland Grand Prix. 2007 and subsequent runnings were day races.

== Race winners ==
=== Champ Car/IndyCar ===
Season	Date	Driver	Team	Chassis	Engine	Race Distance		Race Time	Average Speed (mph)	Report	Ref
Season	Date	Driver	Team	Chassis	Engine	Laps	Miles (km)	Race Time	Average Speed (mph)	Report	Ref
Champ Car history
1998	October 4	(United Kingdom) Dario Franchitti	Team KOOL Green	Reynard	Honda	70*	106.89 (171.99)	1:36:30	66.051	Report	
1999	September 26	(Canada) Paul Tracy	Team KOOL Green	Reynard	Honda	100	152.7 (245.746)	1:55:31	78.96	Report	
2000	October 1	(United States) Jimmy Vasser	Target Chip Ganassi Racing	Lola	Toyota	100	152.7 (245.746)	1:59:02	76.626	Report	
2001	October 7	(Brazil) Gil de Ferran	Penske Racing	Reynard	Honda	100	152.7 (245.746)	1:54:42	79.521	Report	
2002 – 2005	Not held										
2006	May 13	(France) Sébastien Bourdais	Newman/Haas Racing	Lola	Ford Cosworth	96*	162.24 (261.099)	1:59:57	81.154	Report	
2007	April 22	(France) Sébastien Bourdais	Newman/Haas/Lanigan Racing	Panoz	Cosworth	93	156.519 (251.893)	1:45:32	88.986	Report	
2008 – 2012	Not held										
IndyCar Series history
2013	October 5	(New Zealand) Scott Dixon	Chip Ganassi Racing	Dallara	Honda	90	151.47 (243.767)	1:54:48	76.856	Report	
2013	October 6	(Australia) Will Power	Penske Racing	Dallara	Chevrolet	90	151.47 (243.767)	1:52:29	78.444	Report	
2014	June 28	(Colombia) Carlos Huertas	Dale Coyne Racing	Dallara	Honda	80*	134.64 (216.682)	1:51:26	70.389	Report	
2014	June 29	(France) Simon Pagenaud	Schmidt Peterson Motorsports	Dallara	Honda	90	151.47 (243.767)	1:51:44	78.981	Report	

- 1998: Race shortened due to heavy rainshower that caused poor visibility.
- 2006: Race shortened due to time limit.
- 2014: First race shortened due to time limit.

=== Atlantics/Indy Lights ===
Season	Date	Winning driver
Atlantic Championship
1998	October 4	(United States) Anthony Lazzaro
1999	September 26	(Canada) Andrew Bordin
2000	October 1	(Canada) Andrew Bordin
2001	October 7	(United States) Joey Hand
2006	May 13	(Germany) Andreas Wirth
2007	April 22	(Brazil) Raphael Matos
Indy Lights
2000	October 1	(United States) Casey Mears
2013	October 6	(United States) Sage Karam

== Lap records ==
The fastest official race lap records at the Grand Prix of Houston circuits are listed as:

Category	Time	Driver	Vehicle	Event
Grand Prix Circuit (2013–2014): 1.634 mi (2.630 km)
IndyCar	0:59.1215	Luca Filippi	Dallara DW12	2013 Shell-Pennzoil Grand Prix of Houston
Indy Lights	1:05.5724	Gabby Chaves	Dallara IPS	2013 Indy Lights Grand Prix of Houston
Pro Mazda	1:08.6893	Neil Alberico	Star Formula Mazda 'Pro'	2014 Houston Pro Mazda Championship round
US F2000	1:14.908	Henrik Furuseth	Van Diemen DP08	2013 Houston USF2000 round
Pirelli World Challenge GT	1:17.583	Johnny O'Connell	Cadillac CTS-V.R	2013 Houston Pirelli World Challenge round
Pirelli World Challenge GTS	1:21.338	Mark Wilkins	Kia Optima	2013 Houston Pirelli World Challenge round
Pirelli World Challenge TC	1:22.555	Michael Cooper	Mini Cooper	2013 Houston Pirelli World Challenge round
Mazda MX-5 Cup	1:22.633	Kenton Koch	Mazda MX-5 (NC)	2014 Houston Mazda MX-5 Cup round
Pirelli World Challenge TCB	1:32.485	Tyler Palmer	Mazda 2	2013 Houston Pirelli World Challenge round
Grand Prix Circuit (2007): 1.683 mi (2.708 km)
Champ Car	0:58.018	Sebastien Bourdais	Panoz DP01	2007 Grand Prix of Houston
LMP2	1:02.893	Timo Bernhard	Porsche RS Spyder	2007 Lone Star Grand Prix
LMP1	1:03.047	Rinaldo Capello	Audi R10 TDI	2007 Lone Star Grand Prix
Formula Atlantic	1:05.072	Carl Skerlong	Swift 016.a	2007 Houston Formula Atlantic round
GT1 (GTS)	1:07.423	Johnny O'Connell	Chevrolet Corvette C6.R	2007 Lone Star Grand Prix
Star Mazda	1:08.375	Ron White	Star Mazda	2007 Houston Star Mazda Championship round
GT2	1:09.948	Dirk Müller	Ferrari F430 GTC	2007 Lone Star Grand Prix
Grand Prix Circuit (2006): 1.690 mi (2.720 km)
Champ Car	1:00.176	Sébastien Bourdais	Lola B02/00	2006 Grand Prix of Houston
LMP1	1:05.148	Rinaldo Capello	Audi R8	2006 Lone Star Grand Prix
LMP2	1:05.284	Romain Dumas	Porsche RS Spyder	2006 Lone Star Grand Prix
Formula Atlantic	1:05.562	Jonathan Bomarito	Swift 016.a	2006 Houston Formula Atlantic round
GT1 (GTS)	1:08.565	Oliver Gavin	Chevrolet Corvette C6.R	2006 Lone Star Grand Prix
Star Mazda	1:09.941	Ron White	Star Mazda	2006 Houston Star Mazda Championship round
GT2	1:11.383	Jaime Melo	Ferrari F430 GTC	2006 Lone Star Grand Prix
Original Grand Prix Circuit (1998–2001): 1.527 mi (2.457 km)
CART	1:00.219	Michael Andretti	Lola B2K/00	2000 Texaco/Havoline Grand Prix of Houston
Indy Lights	1:05.525	Casey Mears	Lola T97/20	2000 Houston Indy Lights round
Formula Atlantic	1:07.293	Andrew Bordin	Swift 008.a	2000 Houston Formula Atlantic round
