= 2014 U.S. F2000 Winterfest =

Winter racing series

The 2014 U.S. F2000 Cooper Tires Winterfest was the fourth year of the winter racing series promoted by the U.S. F2000 National Championship. It consisted of six races held during two race meets during February 2014 and serves as preparation for the 2014 U.S. F2000 National Championship. Both venues are new for 2014 as the series previously raced on tracks in the state of Florida for the Winterfest.

American R. C. Enerson captured a closely contested title over Brit Michael Epps, with each driver capturing two wins and two other podium finishes. American rookie Jake Eidson finished third in points as the only driver to finish in the top-five in every race. Victor Franzoni won the first race but had two retirements and a DNS and fell to seventh in points and Clarke Toppe won the third race but it was his only top-five finish of the series as he finished fifth in points, six points behind Florian Latorre.

== Drivers and teams ==
Team	No.	Drivers	Notes
(United States) Afterburner Autosport	15	(Brazil) Gustavo Myasava	
(United States) Afterburner Autosport	17	(Brazil) Victor Franzoni	
(United States) Afterburner Autosport	18	(Netherlands) Jeroen Slaghekke	
(United States) ArmsUp Motorsports	24	(United States) Peter Portante	Barber only
(United States) ArmsUp Motorsports	51	(United States) Aaron Telitz	
(United States) Belardi Auto Racing	4	(Canada) Daniel Burkett	Barber only
(United States) Belardi Auto Racing	14	(France) Florian Latorre	
(United States) Belardi Auto Racing	41	(France) Nico Jamin	
(United States) Belardi Auto Racing	44	(United Kingdom) Michael Epps	
(United States) Cape Motorsports w/ Wayne Taylor Racing	2	(United States) Jake Eidson	
(United States) Cape Motorsports w/ Wayne Taylor Racing	3	(Brazil) Danilo Estrela	NOLA only
(United States) JAY Motorsports	96	(Norway) Henrik Furuseth	
(United States) JDC Motorsports	12	(Brazil) Felipe Donato	Barber only
(United States) JDC Motorsports	93	(Australia) Scott Andrews	
(United States) JDC Motorsports	97	(United States) Clark Toppe	
(United States) M2 Autosport	13	(Colombia) Juan Diego Maldonado	
(United States) M2 Autosport	25	(Colombia) Santiago Lozano	
(United States) Pabst Racing Services	23	(United States) Will Owen	
(United States) Pabst Racing Services	77	(United States) Austin Cindric	
(United States) Team E Racing	7	(United States) R. C. Enerson	

== Race calendar and results ==
The series schedule, along with the other Road to Indy series', was announced on October 24, 2013.

Rnd	Circuit	Location	Date	Pole position	Fastest lap	Most laps led	Winning driver	Winning team
1	NOLA Motorsports Park	Avondale, Louisiana	February 21	(United States) R. C. Enerson	(Brazil) Victor Franzoni	not awarded	(Brazil) Victor Franzoni	(United States) Afterburner Autosport
2	NOLA Motorsports Park	Avondale, Louisiana	February 22		(United States) Aaron Telitz	(United States) R. C. Enerson	(United States) R. C. Enerson	(United States) Team E
3	NOLA Motorsports Park	Avondale, Louisiana	February 22		(United States) Clark Toppe	(United States) Clark Toppe	(United States) Clark Toppe	(United States) JDC Motorsports
4	Barber Motorsports Park	Birmingham, Alabama	February 25	(United Kingdom) Michael Epps	(United States) Jake Eidson	(France) Florian Latorre	(United Kingdom) Michael Epps	(United States) Belardi Auto Racing
5	Barber Motorsports Park	Birmingham, Alabama	February 25		(United States) R. C. Enerson	(United Kingdom) Michael Epps	(United Kingdom) Michael Epps	(United States) Belardi Auto Racing
6	Barber Motorsports Park	Birmingham, Alabama	February 26		(United States) R. C. Enerson	(United States) R. C. Enerson	(United States) R. C. Enerson	(United States) Team E

== Championship standings ==
=== Drivers' Championship ===
Pos	Driver	NOL			BAR			Points
1	(United States) R. C. Enerson	**3**	1*	6	4	2	1*	146
2	(United Kingdom) Michael Epps	7	12	3	**1**	1*	2	132
3	(United States) Jake Eidson	5	3	2	5	5	4	118
4	(France) Florian Latorre	9	6	10	2*	3	5	103
5	(United States) Clark Toppe	8	8	1*	10	8	6	97
6	(United States) Aaron Telitz	16	14	5	7	4	3	85
7	(Brazil) Victor Franzoni	1	2	16	3	19	DNS	84
8	(Australia) Scott Andrews	17	4	4	8	9	7	78
9	(Norway) Henrik Furuseth	2	5	7	14	15	18	72
10	(United States) Austin Cindric	13	17	8	9	6	9	61
11	(United States) Will Owen	10	16	9	11	13	13	54
12	(Netherlands) Jeroen Slaghekke	14	13	12	12	10	12	53
13	(France) Nico Jamin	6	7	17	16	18	14	46
14	(Brazil) Gustavo Myasava	11	9	13	19	14	15	43
15	(United States) Peter Portante				6	7	8	42
16	(Colombia) Juan Diego Maldonado	15	11	15	15	16	16	38
17	(Colombia) Santiago Lozano	12	10	14	18	17	17	36
18	(Brazil) Danilo Estrela	4	15	11				35
19	(Brazil) Felipe Donato				13	11	10	29
20	(Canada) Daniel Burkett				17	12	11	23
Pos	Driver	NOL			BAR			Points

Color	Result
Gold	Winner
Silver	2nd place
Bronze	3rd place
Green	4th & 5th place
Light Blue	6th–10th place
Dark Blue	Finished (Outside Top 10)
Purple	Did not finish
Red	Did not qualify (DNQ)
Brown	Withdrawn (Wth)
Black	Disqualified (DSQ)
White	Did not start (DNS)
Blank	Did not participate

**In-line notation** Championship Class only
**Bold**	Pole position (1 point)
Italics	Ran fastest race lap (1 point)
*	Led most race laps (1 point)

=== Teams' ===
Pos	Team	Points
1	(United States) Belardi Auto Racing	149
2	(United States) Team E Racing	115
3	(United States) Cape Motorsports w/ Wayne Taylor Racing	98
4	(United States) JDC Motorsports	80
5	(United States) ArmsUp Motorsports	72
6	(United States) Afterburner Autosport	65
7	(United States) JAY Motorsports	55
8	(United States) Pabst Racing Services	26
9	(United States) M2 Autosport	12
