= 2013 U.S. F2000 Winterfest =

The 2013 U.S. F2000 Cooper Tires Winterfest was the third year of the winter racing series promoted by the U.S. F2000 National Championship. It consisted of six races held during two race meets in Florida during February 2013 and served as preparation for the 2013 U.S. F2000 National Championship.

American Neil Alberico, in his second year in the series and first with Cape Motorsports w/ Wayne Taylor Racing won five of the six races and captured the championship. His Cape teammate, Canadian Scott Hargrove, won one race and finished second in the other five and was runner-up in the championship. Their teammate James Fletcher had three podium finishes and finished third in points. Canadian James Dayson was the only National class entrant and only contested the first three rounds of the championship. There were no lead changes during any of the six races and the first three races at Sebring International Raceway were run without a caution period.

== Drivers and teams ==
Team	No.	Drivers	Notes
(United States) Cape Motorsports w/ Wayne Taylor Racing	2	(United States) Neil Alberico	
(United States) Cape Motorsports w/ Wayne Taylor Racing	3	(United Kingdom) James Fletcher	
(United States) Cape Motorsports w/ Wayne Taylor Racing	32	(Netherlands) Jeroen Slaghekke	
(United States) Cape Motorsports w/ Wayne Taylor Racing	38	(Canada) Scott Hargrove	
(United States) Belardi Auto Racing	4	(Canada) Daniel Burkett	Sebring only
(United States) Belardi Auto Racing	11	(Brazil) Danilo Estrela	Sebring only
(United States) Belardi Auto Racing	14	(United States) Matt McMurry	Palm Beach only
(United States) Belardi Auto Racing	41	(United States) Peter Portante	
(United States) Andretti Autosport	7	(Canada) Garett Grist	
(United States) Andretti Autosport	77	(United States) Austin Cindric	
(United States) JAY Motorsports	9	(Brazil) Felipe Donato	Sebring only
(United States) JAY Motorsports	91	(France) Florian Latorre	
(United States) ZSports w/ Team E Racing	10	(United States) R. C. Enerson	Sebring only
(United States) JDC Motorsports	12	(Brazil) Arthur Oliveira	
(United States) JDC Motorsports	19	(United States) Clarke Toppe	
(United States) JDC Motorsports	54	(United States) Michael Johnson	
(United States) JDC Motorsports	93	(Canada) Stefan Rzadzinski	
(United States) ArmsUp Motorsports	16	(Canada) James Dayson	National class, Sebring only
(United States) ArmsUp Motorsports	51	(Brazil) Felipe Donato	Palm Beach only
(United States) Afterburner Autosport	17	(United States) Wyatt Gooden	Sebring only
(United States) Afterburner Autosport	18	(United States) Jake Eidson	Sebring only
(United States) Pabst Racing Services	21	(Canada) Jesse Lazare	
(United States) Pabst Racing Services	23	(United States) Jason Wolfe	
(Canada) MDL Racing	56	(Canada) Matthew Di Leo	

== Race calendar and results ==
The race schedule was announced on October 23, 2012.

Rnd	Circuit	Location	Date	Pole position	Fastest lap	Most laps led	Winning driver	Winning team
1	Sebring Raceway	Sebring, Florida	February 5	(United States) Neil Alberico	(United States) Neil Alberico	(United States) Neil Alberico	(United States) Neil Alberico	(United States) Cape Motorsports
2	Sebring Raceway	Sebring, Florida	February 6	(United States) Neil Alberico	(United States) Neil Alberico	(United States) Neil Alberico	(United States) Neil Alberico	(United States) Cape Motorsports
3	Sebring Raceway	Sebring, Florida	February 6	(United States) Neil Alberico	(Canada) Garett Grist	(United States) Neil Alberico	(United States) Neil Alberico	(United States) Cape Motorsports
4	Palm Beach International Raceway	Jupiter, Florida	February 9	(Canada) Scott Hargrove	(United States) Neil Alberico	(Canada) Scott Hargrove	(Canada) Scott Hargrove	(United States) Cape Motorsports
5	Palm Beach International Raceway	Jupiter, Florida	February 10	(United States) Neil Alberico	(United States) Neil Alberico	(United States) Neil Alberico	(United States) Neil Alberico	(United States) Cape Motorsports
6	Palm Beach International Raceway	Jupiter, Florida	February 10	(United States) Neil Alberico	(United States) Neil Alberico	(United States) Neil Alberico	(United States) Neil Alberico	(United States) Cape Motorsports

== Championship standings ==
=== Drivers' Championship ===
Pos	Driver	SEB			PBI			Points
Championship Class
1	(United States) Neil Alberico	**1***	1*	1*	2	1*	1*	186
2	(Canada) Scott Hargrove	2	2	2	**1***	2	2	157
3	(United Kingdom) James Fletcher	19	3	4	3	3	4	107
4	(Canada) Garett Grist	17	4	3	4	4	5	102
5	(Canada) Stefan Rzadzinski	4	9	7	11	5	6	87
6	(Canada) Jesse Lazare	7	6	5	13	6	3	84
7	(United States) Jason Wolfe	9	10	12	9	7	11	68
8	(Canada) Matthew Di Leo	10	14	9	6	13	14	60
9	(United States) Peter Portante	8	7	8	DNS	16	8	58
10	(Brazil) Arthur Oliveira	14	15	14	8	12	12	51
11	(Brazil) Felipe Donato	DNS	20	15	5	10	10	45
12	(France) Florian Latorre	20	21	11	14	11	7	38
13	(United States) Clark Toppe	13	16	DNS	10	14	16	32
14	(United States) Austin Cindric	12	DNS	DNS	7	DNS	15	29
15	(Netherlands) Jeroen Slaghekke	DNS	19	16	15	8	13	29
16	(United States) Michael Johnson	11	13	18	12	15	17	29
Not classified
	(United States) Jake Eidson	6	8	6				43
	(Brazil) Danilo Estrela	3	5	19				40
	(United States) R. C. Enerson	5	12	10				37
	(United States) Wyatt Gooden	18	11	17				18
	(Canada) Daniel Burkett	15	17	13				18
	(United States) Matt McMurry				DNS	9	9	
National Class
1	(Canada) James Dayson	16	18	DNS				44

Color	Result
Gold	Winner
Silver	2nd place
Bronze	3rd place
Green	4th & 5th place
Light Blue	6th–10th place
Dark Blue	Finished (Outside Top 10)
Purple	Did not finish
Red	Did not qualify (DNQ)
Brown	Withdrawn (Wth)
Black	Disqualified (DSQ)
White	Did not start (DNS)
Blank	Did not participate

**In-line notation** Championship Class only
**Bold**	Pole position (1 point)
Italics	Ran fastest race lap (1 point)
*	Led most race laps (1 point)

=== Teams' ===
Pos	Team	Points
1	(United States) Cape Motorsports w/ Wayne Taylor Racing	240
2	(United States) Andretti Autosport	70
3	(United States) Pabst Racing Services	59
4	(United States) Belardi Auto Racing	49
5	(United States) JDC Motorsports	48
6	(United States) Afterburner Autosport	23
7	(United States) ArmsUp Motorsports	14
8	(Canada) MDL Racing	14
9	(United States) JAY Motorsports	13
10	(United States) ZSports w/ Team E Racing	12
