= 2013 F1600 Championship Series =

2013 F1600 Championship season

Seasons
- ← 2012 2014 →

The 2013 F1600 Championship Series season was the third season of the F1600 Championship Series.

Eighteen-year-old Jake Eidson from Littleton, Colorado won the championship driving for Cape Motorsports w/ Wayne Taylor Racing. Eidson won seven of the twelve races and captured a race win in all but one of the series' weekend double-headers. Bryan Herta Autosport's Adrian Starrantino captured three wins on his way to runner-up honors in the championship.

Notably, IndyCar Series rookie Tristan Vautier joined the series for its race weekend at the Mid-Ohio Sports Car Course to gain experience at the track that he had not raced at before and where he would race in IndyCar a few weeks later. Vautier won the pole for race two, but finished just sixth and 13th in the pair of races.

== Drivers and teams ==
Team	No.	Driver	Car	Engine	Notes
(United States) Polestar Racing Group	0	(United States) Lewis Cooper, III	Van Diemen RF00	Ford Kent	Masters
(United States) Carbir Race Cars	01	(United States) Reid Hazelton	Carbir CR8	Honda Fit	
(United States) ONP Racing	2	(United States) Mike Scanlan	Swift DB6	Honda Fit	Masters
(United States) Auriana Racing	3	(United States) Joe Colasacco	Van Diemen RF04	Honda Fit	Masters
(United States) DiRenzo Racing	5	(United States) Dan Oseth	Van Diemen RF02	Honda Fit	
(United States) Dotworks Racing	06	(United States) Austin McCusker	Van Diemen RF01	Honda Fit	
(United States) Raceworks	7	(United States) Jim Goughary, Jr.	Van Diemen RF00	Honda Fit	Masters
(United States) Raceworks	9	(United States) Franklin Futrelle	Van Diemen RF03	Honda Fit	
(Canada) Rice Race Prep	07	(Canada) Steve Bamford	Mygale SJ11	Honda Fit	Masters
(United States) Cape Motorsports w/ Wayne Taylor Racing	10	(United States) Jake Eidson	Spectrum 012	Honda Fit	
(United States) Ski Motorsports	12	(United States) Jeremy Grenier	Citation	Honda Fit	
(United States) WISKO Race Engineering	13	(United States) Aaron Telitz	Mygale SJ12	Honda Fit	
(United States) WISKO Race Engineering	66	(United States) Paul Alspach	Mygale SJ12	Honda Fit	
(United States) Quantum Mechanics	16	(Japan) Haru Tanaka	Van Diemen RF98	Honda Fit	
(United States) Quantum Mechanics	16	(United States) Slade Miller	Van Diemen RF98	Honda Fit	
(United States) Buffalo Racing Services	18	(United States) Dan Pyanowski	Swift DB1	Ford Kent	Masters
(United States) Art Foster Racing	21	(United States) Art Foster	Spectrum 012	Honda Fit	Masters
(United States) Front Range Motorsports	24	(United States) John Butkovich	Van Diemen RF00	Honda Fit	Masters
(Canada) Exclusive Autosport/Michael Duncalfe	30	(United States) Jack Mitchell, Jr.	Spectrum 014	Honda Fit	
(Canada) Exclusive Autosport/Michael Duncalfe	33	(Canada) Thomas McGregor	Spectrum 014	Honda Fit	
(United States) Two Dogg Racing	31	(United States) Scott Rubenzer	Spectrum 012	Honda Fit	Masters
	36	(United States) Steve Roux	Wyvern SR-1	Honda Fit	
(United States) RECON Racing	44	(United States) Ed Callo	Bowman BC5	Ford Kent	Masters
(United States) Fisher House Racing	55	(United States) Ray Phillips	Van Diemen RF97	Honda Fit	Masters
(Canada) Britain West	63	(Canada) Gord Ross	Van Diemen RF02	Ford Kent	
(Canada) Warpspeed	68	(Canada) Caitlin Johnston	Van Diemen RF97	Honda Fit	
(United States) DBM Racing	72	(United States) Steve Oseth	Citation	Honda Fit	Masters
(United States) Captain America Racing	76	(United States) Jim Lee	Swift DB1	Ford Kent	Masters
	76	(United States) Don Baggett	Swift DB6	Ford Kent	
(United States) Kautz Racing	88	(United States) Tim Kautz	Piper DF5	Honda Fit	Masters
(United States) Bryan Herta Autosport	96	(Norway) Ayla Ågren	Mygale SJ12	Honda Fit	
(United States) Bryan Herta Autosport	97	(United States) Sam Chastain	Mygale SJ12	Honda Fit	
(United States) Bryan Herta Autosport	98	(United States) Adrian Starrantino	Mygale SJ12	Honda Fit	
(United States) Maisey Racing	99	(United States) Sean Maisey	Citation	Honda Fit	Masters

== Race calendar and results ==
Round	Circuit	Location	Date	Pole position	Fastest lap	Winning driver
1	Virginia International Raceway	(United States) Alton, Virginia	April 13	(United States) Adrian Starrantino	(United States) Adrian Starrantino	(United States) Adrian Starrantino
2	Virginia International Raceway	(United States) Alton, Virginia	April 14	(Norway) Ayla Ågren	(United States) Jake Eidson	(United States) Adrian Starrantino
3	Road Atlanta	(United States) Braselton, Georgia	May 10	(United States) Aaron Telitz	(Norway) Ayla Ågren	(United States) Aaron Telitz
4	Road Atlanta	(United States) Braselton, Georgia	May 11	(United States) Jake Eidson	(United States) Jake Eidson	(United States) Jake Eidson
5	Lime Rock Park	(United States) Lakeville, Connecticut	May 24	(United States) Adrian Starrantino	(United States) Jake Eidson	(United States) Jake Eidson
6	Lime Rock Park	(United States) Lakeville, Connecticut	May 25		(United States) Paul Alspach	(United States) Jake Eidson
7	Mid-Ohio Sports Car Course	(United States) Lexington, Ohio	July 27	(United States) Jake Eidson	(United States) Aaron Telitz	(United States) Jake Eidson
8	Mid-Ohio Sports Car Course	(United States) Lexington, Ohio	July 28	(France) Tristan Vautier	(United States) Jake Eidson	(United States) Adrian Starrantino
9	Mid-Ohio Sports Car Course	(United States) Lexington, Ohio	August 10	(United States) Jake Eidson	(United States) David Grant	(United States) Jake Eidson
10	Mid-Ohio Sports Car Course	(United States) Lexington, Ohio	August 11	(United States) Jake Eidson	(United States) David Grant	(United States) Jake Eidson
11	Summit Point Motorsports Park	(United States) Summit Point, West Virginia	August 24	(United States) Aaron Telitz	(Norway) Ayla Ågren	(United States) Adrian Starrantino
12	Summit Point Motorsports Park	(United States) Summit Point, West Virginia	August 25		(Norway) Ayla Ågren	(United States) Jake Eidson

== Final points standings ==
Place	Driver	Starts	Points
1	(United States) Jake Eidson	12	499
2	(United States) Adrian Starrantino	12	440
3	(United States) Aaron Telitz	12	396
4	(Norway) Ayla Ågren	12	322
5	(Canada) Steve Bamford (M)	12	317
6	(United States) Paul Alspach	10	301
7	(United States) Jim Goughary (M)	12	266
8	(United States) Art Foster (M)	12	250
9	(United States) Sam Chastain	12	210
10	(United States) Mike Scanlan (M)	12	174
11	(United States) Scott Rubenzer (M)	8	172
12	(United States) Austin McCusker	12	160
13	(United States) Joe Colasacco (M)	6	159
14	(United States) Lewis Cooper, III (M)	6	121
15	(United States) David Grant	2	88
16	(United States) Franklin Futrelle	4	83
17	(United States) Dan Oseth	5	71
18	(United States) Wes Allen	4	68
19	(United States) Ed Callo (M)	4	66
20	(United States) Ray Phillips (M)	4	61
21	(United States) Tim Kautz (M)	2	48
22	(France) Tristan Vautier	2	47
23	(United States) Don Baggett	4	42
24	(United States) Slade Miller	2	39
25	(United States) Jeremy Grenier	2	32
25	(United States) Glenn Taylor (M)	2	32
27	(United States) Joe Parsons (M)	2	30
28	(United States) Jacob Carpenter	2	28
29	(Japan) Haru Tanaka	2	19
29	(United States) Dan Pyanowski (M)	4	19
31	(United States) Bob Perona (M)	2	18
32	(United States) Rob Albani (M)	2	15
33	(United States) Jim Lee (M)	2	12
34	(United States) Steve Roux (M)	1	6
35	(Canada) Caitlin Johnston	1	1

(M) indicates Masters Class driver
Points include total points from 10 best races.
