= 2012 Formula Renault 2.0 Northern European Cup =

Auto racing championship

2012 Formula Renault 2.0 NEC

Seasons
- ← 2011 2013 →

The 2012 Formula Renault 2.0 Northern European Cup is the seventh Formula Renault 2.0 Northern European Cup season. The season began at Hockenheimring on 21 April and finished on 14 October at Spa, after 20 races at 8 events.

== Drivers and teams ==
After the Formula Renault UK was cancelled for the 2012 season, British team Fortec Motorsports joined the Formula Renault 2.0 NEC with refugee Josh Hill and Intersteps champion Jake Dennis among its drivers, whereas Manor Competition followed with Jordan King.

Team	No.	Driver name	Rounds
(Poland) Inter Europol Competition	2	(Poland) Jakub Śmiechowski	All
(Poland) Inter Europol Competition	3	(France) Remi Kirchdörffer	All
(Poland) Inter Europol Competition	4	(Germany) Lena Heun	8
(Germany) Josef Kaufmann Racing	5	(Netherlands) Pieter Schothorst	1–2, 4–5
(Germany) Josef Kaufmann Racing	6	(Spain) Alex Riberas	1–2, 5
(Germany) Josef Kaufmann Racing	7	(Belgium) Stoffel Vandoorne	1–2, 5
(Germany) SL Formula Racing	8	(Switzerland) David Freiburghaus	1–6
(Germany) SL Formula Racing	9	(United States) Robert Siska	1–2, 5–6
(Germany) SL Formula Racing	41	(Belgium) Alessio Picariello	3–4, 6, 8
(Netherlands) Van Amersfoort Racing	10	(Russia) Roman Beregech	All
(Netherlands) Van Amersfoort Racing	11	(Netherlands) Jeroen Slaghekke	All
(Finland) PositionOne Motorsport	14	(Finland) Leopold Ringbom	All
(Belgium) KTR	16	(Spain) Victor Colomé	All
(Belgium) KTR	17	(Japan) Yu Kanamaru	All
(Belgium) KTR	18	(Italy) Ignazio D'Agosto	All
(Belgium) Speedlover	20	(Netherlands) Frank Suntjens	All
(Austria) Interwetten.com Racing	23	(Thailand) Sandy Stuvik	All
(Austria) Interwetten.com Racing	24	(Sweden) Victor Bouveng	1–3, 5–8
(France) R-ace GP	26	(Netherlands) Nyck de Vries	1–2, 4–5, 8
(France) R-ace GP	27	(France) Pierre Gasly	1–2, 5
(France) R-ace GP	28	(France) Andrea Pizzitola	1–2, 4–5, 8
(Netherlands) Manor MP Motorsport	30	(United Kingdom) Raoul Owens	8
(Netherlands) Manor MP Motorsport	31	(Sweden) Kevin Kleveros	1
(Netherlands) Manor MP Motorsport	32	(United Kingdom) Jordan King	All
(Netherlands) Manor MP Motorsport	33	(Netherlands) Meindert van Buuren	All
(Netherlands) Manor MP Motorsport	34	(Netherlands) Steijn Schothorst	All
(Netherlands) Manor MP Motorsport	35	(Thailand) Tanart Sathienthirakul	All
(Netherlands) Manor MP Motorsport	36	(Russia) Alexey Chuklin	1–3, 5–6
(Netherlands) Manor MP Motorsport	37	(Austria) Corinna Kamper	5–6
(Sweden) Trackstar	31	(Sweden) Kevin Kleveros	2–8
(Sweden) Trackstar	48	(Sweden) Ronnie Lundströmer	1–4, 6
(Switzerland) Daltec Racing	37	(Austria) Corinna Kamper	1–4
(Switzerland) Daltec Racing	38	(Germany) Dennis Wüsthoff	All
(Switzerland) Daltec Racing	39	(Israel) Rafael Danieli	1
(Switzerland) Daltec Racing	40	(Italy) Kevin Giovesi	1
(Switzerland) Daltec Racing	44	(Switzerland) Christof von Grünigen	1–2, 5–6
(Switzerland) Daltec Racing	67	(Switzerland) Kevin Jörg	8
(Czech Republic) Krenek Motorsport	42	(Czech Republic) Gabriela Jílková	6
(Czech Republic) Krenek Motorsport	43	(Slovakia) Richard Gonda	1–3
(Czech Republic) Krenek Motorsport	45	(Slovakia) Christian Malcharek	6
(Italy) One Racing	45	(Poland) Alex Bosak	5
(United Kingdom) Fortec Motorsports	52	(United Kingdom) Seb Morris	8
(United Kingdom) Fortec Motorsports	53	(Finland) Mikko Pakari	1–2, 4, 6, 8
(United Kingdom) Fortec Motorsports	54	(United Arab Emirates) Ed Jones	1–2, 4, 6, 8
(United Kingdom) Fortec Motorsports	55	(United Kingdom) Josh Hill	All
(United Kingdom) Fortec Motorsports	56	(United Kingdom) Jake Dennis	All
(United Kingdom) Fortec Motorsports	57	(United Kingdom) Dan de Zille	All
(United Kingdom) Fortec Motorsports	58	(India) Shahaan Engineer	All
(United Kingdom) Mark Burdett Motorsport	60	(Brazil) Gabriel Casagrande	1, 3–8
(United Kingdom) Mark Burdett Motorsport	61	(Poland) Tomasz Krzeminski	7
(United Kingdom) Mark Burdett Motorsport	62	(Brazil) Gustavo Lima	8
(Italy) Prema Powerteam	63	(Italy) Luca Ghiotto	8
(Italy) Prema Powerteam	64	(Brazil) Bruno Bonifacio	8
(United Kingdom) Falcon Motorsport	65	(South Africa) Liam Venter	8
(Austria) Sandro Luković	68	(Austria) Sandro Luković	8

== Race calendar and results ==
The eight-event provisional calendar for the 2012 season was announced on 22 November 2011. The Spa round was later moved to the end of the season.

Round		Circuit	Date	Pole position	Fastest lap	Winning driver	Winning team	Event
1	R1	(Germany) Hockenheimring	21 April	(Belgium) Stoffel Vandoorne	(Belgium) Stoffel Vandoorne	(Belgium) Stoffel Vandoorne	(Germany) Josef Kaufmann Racing	Preis der Stadt Stuttgart
1	R2	(Germany) Hockenheimring	22 April	(Belgium) Stoffel Vandoorne	(Belgium) Stoffel Vandoorne	(United Kingdom) Jake Dennis	(United Kingdom) Fortec Motorsports	Preis der Stadt Stuttgart
1	R3	(Germany) Hockenheimring	22 April	(Netherlands) Jeroen Slaghekke	(Netherlands) Nyck de Vries	(Belgium) Stoffel Vandoorne	(Germany) Josef Kaufmann Racing	Preis der Stadt Stuttgart
2	R1	(Germany) Nürburgring	22 June	(Belgium) Stoffel Vandoorne	(Belgium) Stoffel Vandoorne	(Belgium) Stoffel Vandoorne	(Germany) Josef Kaufmann Racing	VLN
2	R2	(Germany) Nürburgring	23 June	(Belgium) Stoffel Vandoorne	(Belgium) Stoffel Vandoorne	(Belgium) Stoffel Vandoorne	(Germany) Josef Kaufmann Racing	VLN
3	R1	(Germany) Motorsport Arena Oschersleben	7 July	(Netherlands) Jeroen Slaghekke	(Netherlands) Steijn Schothorst	(United Kingdom) Josh Hill	(United Kingdom) Fortec Motorsports	Preis der Stadt Magdeburg
3	R2	(Germany) Motorsport Arena Oschersleben	7 July	(United Kingdom) Jake Dennis	(United Kingdom) Josh Hill	(United Kingdom) Josh Hill	(United Kingdom) Fortec Motorsports	Preis der Stadt Magdeburg
3	R3	(Germany) Motorsport Arena Oschersleben	8 July	(Belgium) Alessio Picariello	(United Kingdom) Jake Dennis	(United Kingdom) Jake Dennis	(United Kingdom) Fortec Motorsports	Preis der Stadt Magdeburg
4	R1	(Netherlands) TT Circuit Assen	4 August	(United Kingdom) Jake Dennis	(Netherlands) Steijn Schothorst	(United Kingdom) Jake Dennis	(United Kingdom) Fortec Motorsports	Gamma Racing Day
4	R2	(Netherlands) TT Circuit Assen	5 August	(Netherlands) Nyck de Vries	(Netherlands) Nyck de Vries	(Netherlands) Nyck de Vries	(France) R-ace GP	Gamma Racing Day
5	R1	(Austria) Red Bull Ring	26 August	(Spain) Alex Riberas	(Belgium) Stoffel Vandoorne	(Spain) Alex Riberas	(Germany) Josef Kaufmann Racing	AvD
5	R2	(Austria) Red Bull Ring	26 August	(Spain) Alex Riberas	(United Kingdom) Josh Hill	(Belgium) Stoffel Vandoorne	(Germany) Josef Kaufmann Racing	AvD
6	R1	(Czech Republic) Autodrom Most	1 September	(United Kingdom) Josh Hill	(United Kingdom) Josh Hill	(United Kingdom) Josh Hill	(United Kingdom) Fortec Motorsports	ADAC Truck Grand Prix
6	R2	(Czech Republic) Autodrom Most	2 September	(United Kingdom) Jake Dennis	(United Kingdom) Jordan King	(Netherlands) Jeroen Slaghekke	(Netherlands) Van Amersfoort Racing	ADAC Truck Grand Prix
6	R3	(Czech Republic) Autodrom Most	2 September	(Finland) Leopold Ringbom	(Finland) Mikko Pakari	(Netherlands) Steijn Schothorst	(Netherlands) Manor MP Motorsport	ADAC Truck Grand Prix
7	R1	(Netherlands) Circuit Park Zandvoort	22 September	(Netherlands) Jeroen Slaghekke	(United Kingdom) Jake Dennis	(United Kingdom) Josh Hill	(United Kingdom) Fortec Motorsports	Trophy of the Dunes
7	R2	(Netherlands) Circuit Park Zandvoort	22 September	(India) Shahaan Engineer	(Netherlands) Steijn Schothorst	(Netherlands) Steijn Schothorst	(Netherlands) Manor MP Motorsport	Trophy of the Dunes
7	R3	(Netherlands) Circuit Park Zandvoort	23 September	(India) Shahaan Engineer	(United Kingdom) Jordan King	(United Kingdom) Jordan King	(Netherlands) Manor MP Motorsport	Trophy of the Dunes
8	R1	(Belgium) Circuit de Spa-Francorchamps	14 October	(Finland) Mikko Pakari	(Belgium) Alessio Picariello	(United Kingdom) Josh Hill	(United Kingdom) Fortec Motorsports	Racing Festival
8	R2	(Belgium) Circuit de Spa-Francorchamps	14 October	(Finland) Mikko Pakari	(France) Andrea Pizzitola	(Japan) Yu Kanamaru	(Belgium) KTR	Racing Festival

== Standings ==
=== Drivers' Championship ===
- Championship points were awarded on a 30, 24, 20, 17, 16, 15, 14, 13, 12, 11, 10, 9, 8, 7, 6, 5, 4, 3, 2, 1 to the top 20 classified finishers in each race.

Pos	Driver	HOC (Germany)			NÜR (Germany)		OSC (Germany)			ASS (Netherlands)		RBR (Austria)		MST (Czech Republic)			ZAN (Netherlands)			SPA (Belgium)		Points
Pos	Driver	1	2	3	4	5	6	7	8	9	10	11	12	13	14	15	16	17	18	19	20	Points
1	(United Kingdom) Jake Dennis	3	1	2	12	7	3	**4**	1	**1**	3	4	2	3	**7**	4	3	3	5	Ret	7	376
2	(United Kingdom) Jordan King	2	5	5	2	5	2	2	Ret	8	2	11	22	2	3	3	5	15	1	12	25	316
3	(United Kingdom) Josh Hill	Ret	3	25	6	4	1	1	2	25	5	7	4	**1**	Ret	6	1	Ret	6	1	12	311
4	(Netherlands) Jeroen Slaghekke	6	11	**7**	14	13	**5**	6	4	7	10	10	12	16	1	11	**2**	Ret	4	13	21	241
5	(Netherlands) Steijn Schothorst	7	Ret	Ret	13	10	4	21	3	6	7	9	Ret	5	21	1	18	1	16	11	9	212
6	(Sweden) Kevin Kleveros	5	12	6	29	8	11	5	8	Ret	4	21	20	9	4	Ret	9	5	7	6	28	196
7	(India) Shahaan Engineer	8	8	Ret	31	DNS	9	8	7	24	14	16	10	15	9	12	6	**2**	**2**	5	20	195
8	(Brazil) Gabriel Casagrande	26	29	15			7	13	5	12	12	3	8	8	2	5	7	Ret	Ret	4	19	181
9	(Belgium) Stoffel Vandoorne	**1**	**19**	1	**1**	**1**						2	1									176
10	(Netherlands) Nyck de Vries	32	6	22	4	2				2	**1**	5	3							8	14	166
11	(Netherlands) Meindert van Buuren	DNS	9	Ret	16	11	15	Ret	9	11	6	18	7	Ret	28	16	4	4	3	9	18	161
12	(Finland) Leopold Ringbom	11	15	9	Ret	12	17	9	23	Ret	25	13	16	6	5	**9**	8	10	14	7	27	154
13	(France) Andrea Pizzitola	4	2	3	9	3				3	Ret	8	Ret							10	17	141
14	(Thailand) Sandy Stuvik	10	10	Ret	11	DNS	8	7	6	20	13	14	11	7	23	22	11	Ret	10	16	23	140
15	(Belgium) Alessio Picariello						6	3	**19**	16	28			4	27	2				2	8	120
16	(Spain) Alex Riberas	14	4	4	10	22						**1**	**6**									97
17	(Japan) Yu Kanamaru	23	Ret	Ret	DNS	21	10	12	20	13	17	20	15	21	13	20	Ret	7	Ret	17	1	97
18	(Italy) Ignazio D'Agosto	27	30	24	17	23	13	17	10	10	11	Ret	19	13	26	10	Ret	6	Ret	Ret	16	89
19	(Germany) Dennis Wüsthoff	18	14	Ret	30	15	25	24	24	15	20	15	Ret	18	14	13	12	8	8	15	24	88
20	(Spain) Victor Colomé	Ret	Ret	Ret	21	14	12	Ret	DNS	Ret	18	Ret	Ret	14	8	7	Ret	11	Ret	Ret	2	87
21	(United Arab Emirates) Ed Jones	33	25	13	8	DNS				5	8			10	18	8				25	15	85
22	(Sweden) Victor Bouveng	13	22	11	28	16	16	Ret	Ret			22	14	17	Ret	Ret	16	9	12	22	4	82
23	(France) Pierre Gasly	Ret	13	17	3	6						6	5									78
24	(Finland) Mikko Pakari	30	16	8	7	Ret				9	Ret			11	6	Ret				**Ret**	**13**	75
25	(Poland) Jakub Śmiechowski	9	Ret	16	15	DNS	22	10	13	23	16	19	17	27	19	19	13	Ret	11	Ret	10	75
26	(United Kingdom) Dan de Zille	NC	28	Ret	18	24	14	18	11	17	15	Ret	18	Ret	25	23	10	Ret	9	Ret	22	63
27	(Thailand) Tanart Sathienthirakul	21	20	12	24	17	21	14	14	14	21	Ret	24	20	12	14	14	Ret	15	20	32	60
28	(Switzerland) Christof von Grünigen	16	DNS	10	26	9						12	9	24	Ret	Ret						49
29	(Russia) Roman Beregech	22	18	Ret	22	18	20	15	22	19	26	17	13	Ret	11	21	Ret	14	17	26	30	48
30	(Netherlands) Pieter Schothorst	Ret	Ret	DNS	5	Ret				4	9	23	Ret									45
31	(Netherlands) Frank Suntjens	12	21	19	25	20	23	22	18	22	24	27	23	19	17	26	15	Ret	DNS	24	5	44
32	(Sweden) Ronnie Lundströmer	15	Ret	18	20	28	18	11	16	18	19			23	16	18						41
33	(Switzerland) David Freiburghaus	17	Ret	DNS	19	19	26	20	17	Ret	22	24	28	12	Ret	17						25
34	(Russia) Alexey Chuklin	31	Ret	20	23	29	Ret	16	25			25	Ret	25	10	15						23
35	(Brazil) Bruno Bonifacio																			3	Ret	20
36	(Austria) Sandro Lukovic																			Ret	3	20
37	(Poland) Tomasz Krzeminski																Ret	12	13			17
38	(Slovakia) Richard Gonda	24	24	14	DNS	DNS	DNS	19	15													15
39	(Brazil) Gustavo Lima																			Ret	6	15
40	(Italy) Kevin Giovesi	20	7	Ret																		14
41	(Switzerland) Corinna Kamper	25	23	26	27	25	19	23	12	21	23	26	21	22	20	Ret						12
42	(France) Remi Kirchdörffer	29	26	23	32	26	24	Ret	21	26	27	29	27	28	24	24	17	13	Ret	27	31	12
43	(United Kingdom) Seb Morris																			23	11	10
44	(Italy) Luca Ghiotto																			14	Ret	7
45	(Slovakia) Christian Malcharek													26	15	Ret						6
46	(Israel) Rafael Danieli	19	17	Ret																		5
47	(Switzerland) Kevin Jörg																			18	29	3
48	(United Kingdom) Raoul Owens																			19	33	2
49	(United States) Robert Siska	28	27	21	Ret	27						30	26	29	22	25						0
50	(South Africa) Liam Venter																			21	Ret	0
51	(Poland) Alex Bosak											28	25									0
52	(Germany) Lena Heun																			Ret	26	0
53	(Czech Republic) Gabriela Jílková													Ret	Ret	27						0
Pos	Driver	HOC (Germany)			NÜR (Germany)		OSC (Germany)			ASS (Netherlands)		RBR (Austria)		MST (Czech Republic)			ZAN (Netherlands)			SPA (Belgium)		Points

Colour	Result
Gold	Winner
Silver	Second place
Bronze	Third place
Green	Points classification
Blue	Non-points classification
Blue	Non-classified finish (NC)
Purple	Retired, not classified (Ret)
Red	Did not qualify (DNQ)
Red	Did not pre-qualify (DNPQ)
Black	Disqualified (DSQ)
White	Did not start (DNS)
White	Withdrew (WD)
White	Race cancelled (C)
Blank	Did not practice (DNP)
Blank	Did not arrive (DNA)
Blank	Excluded (EX)

**Bold** – Pole
Italics – Fastest Lap

=== Teams' Championship ===
Pos	Team	HOC (Germany)			NÜR (Germany)		OSC (Germany)			ASS (Netherlands)		RBR (Austria)		MST (Czech Republic)			ZAN (Netherlands)			SPA (Belgium)		Points
1	(United Kingdom) Fortec Motorsports	3	1	2	6	4	1	1	1	1	3	4	2	1	6	4	1	2	2	1	7	471
2	(Netherlands) Manor MP Motorsport	2	5	5	2	5	2	2	3	6	2	9	7	2	3	1	4	1	1	9	9	404
3	(Netherlands) Van Amersfoort Racing	6	11	7	14	13	5	6	4	7	10	10	12	16	1	11	2	14	4	13	21	248
4	(Germany) Josef Kaufmann Racing	1	4	1	1	1				4	9	1	1									226
5	(France) R-ace GP	4	2	3	3	2				2	1	5	3							8	14	215
6	(United Kingdom) Mark Burdett Motorsport	26	29	15			7	13	5	12	12	3	8	8	2	5	7	12	13	4	6	201
7	(Austria) Interwetten.com Racing	10	10	11	11	16	8	7	6	20	13	14	11	7	23	22	11	9	10	16	4	184
8	(Sweden) Trackstar	15	Ret	18	20	8	11	5	8	18	4	21	20	9	4	18	9	5	7	6	28	172
9	(Belgium) KTR	23	30	24	17	14	10	12	10	10	11	20	15	13	8	7	Ret	6	Ret	17	1	154
10	(Finland) PositionOne Motorsport	11	15	9	Ret	12	17	9	23	Ret	25	13	16	6	5	9	8	10	14	7	27	154
11	(Switzerland) Daltec Racing	16	7	10	26	9	19	23	12	15	20	12	9	18	14	13	12	8	8	15	24	140
12	(Germany) SL Formula Racing	17	27	21	19	19	6	3	17	16	22	24	26	4	22	2				2	8	130
13	(Poland) Inter Europol Competition	9	26	16	15	26	22	10	13	23	16	19	17	27	19	19	13	13	11	27	10	94
14	(Belgium) Speedlover	12	21	19	25	20	23	22	18	22	24	27	23	19	17	26	15	Ret	DNS	24	5	43
15	(Czech Republic) Krenek Motorsport	24	24	14	DNS	DNS	DNS	19	15	26	15	27										21
16	(Italy) Prema Powerteam																			3	Ret	20
17	(Austria) Sandro Luković																			Ret	3	20
18	(United Kingdom) Falcon Motorsport																			21	Ret	0
Pos	Team	HOC (Germany)			NÜR (Germany)		OSC (Germany)			ASS (Netherlands)		RBR (Austria)		MST (Czech Republic)			ZAN (Netherlands)			SPA (Belgium)		Points
