= Kyle O'Gara =

American racing driver

- Born: Kyle O'Gara; February 23, 1995 (age 31); Beech Grove, Indiana, U.S.
- Spouse: Marissa O’Gara
- Relatives: Sarah Fisher (sister-in-law)

Kyle O'Gara (born February 23, 1995, in Beech Grove, Indiana) is an American racing driver.

== Career ==
O'Gara competed in the USAC National Midget Series in 2011 and 2012. He finished fourth at the USAC Pavement Midget Series in 2013, and he claimed the title in 2014.

On October 18, 2012, O'Gara completed his Indy Lights rookie test at Kentucky Speedway with Fan Force United. On March 27, 2013, he announced that he had signed with Schmidt Peterson Motorsports to make his Indy Lights debut in the 2013 Freedom 100 at Indianapolis Motor Speedway. O'Gara crashed out on lap two while running fifth. He also competed in the season finale at Auto Club Speedway and finished eighth.

In 2017, O'Gara was runner-up at the Rumble in Fort Wayne midget race.

In 2020, O'Gara finished fourth at the Little 500 sprint car race at Anderson Speedway.

In 2021, O'Gara entered four rounds of the USAC Silver Crown Series, with a best result of fifth at the Rich Vogler Classic at Winchester Speedway.

In 2022, O'Gara ranked third at the Indiana-based 500 Sprint Car Tour, scoring a win and five top-three finishes in nine races. He also won the Dave Steele World Non-Wing Sprint Car Championship at Showtime Speedway, and finished fourth at the Little 500.

== Personal life ==
O'Gara is the brother-in-law of Sarah Fisher, an ex-IndyCar Series driver and former co-owner of Sarah Fisher Hartman Racing. He attended Roncalli High School in Indianapolis.

== Racing record ==
=== Indy Lights ===
Year	Team	1	2	3	4	5	6	7	8	9	10	11	12	Rank	Points
2013	Schmidt Peterson Motorsports	STP	ALA	LBH	INDY; 11	MIL	IOW	POC	TOR	MOH	BAL	HOU	FON; 8	12th	43

=== U.S. F2000 National Championship ===
Year	Team	1	2	3	4	5	6	7	8	9	10	11	12	13	14	Rank	Points
2014	GBI Racing	STP	STP	BAR	BAR	IMS	IMS	LOR; 18	TOR	TOR	MOH	MOH	MOH	SNM	SNM	25th	3
