= 2011 British Formula Ford Championship =

Seasons
- ← 2010 2012 →

The 2011 British Formula Ford Championship (an entry level single seater motor sport category), was the 36th edition of the British Formula Ford Championship. It commenced on 9 April at the Silverstone National Circuit and ended on 9 October at Silverstone Arena Circuit after 8 rounds and 24 races, all held in the United Kingdom and the Netherlands. Scott Malvern was the dominant driver for the season, breaking previous records in winning 18 of the 24 rounds and having two further podiums, in doing so wrapping up the championship at the penultimate event at Donington and giving Jamun Racing a 7th consecutive teams title.

== Drivers and teams ==
Team	No.	Driver	Class	Chassis	Rounds
(United Kingdom) Jamun Racing	1	(Netherlands) Jeroen Slaghekke	C	Mygale SJ11	All
(United Kingdom) Jamun Racing	2	(United Kingdom) Scott Malvern	C	Mygale SJ11	All
(United Kingdom) Jamun Racing	3	(Australia) Nick McBride	C	Mygale SJ11	1–4, 6–8
(United Kingdom) Jamun Racing	43	(Australia) Nick McBride	C	Mygale SJ11	5
(United Kingdom) Jamun Racing	4	(Australia) Spike Goddard	C	Mygale SJ11	1–4, 6–8
(United Kingdom) Jamun Racing	44	(Australia) Spike Goddard	C	Mygale SJ11	5
(United Kingdom) Jamun Racing	9	(United Kingdom) Jake Cook	C	Mygale SJ11	1–5
(United Kingdom) Jamun Racing	93	(South Africa) Robert Wolk	G	Mygale SJ11	8
(United Kingdom) Jamun Racing	94	(Australia) Jack Le Brocq	G	Mygale SJ11	8
(United Kingdom) Jamun Racing	99	(United Kingdom) Chrissy Palmer	G	Mygale SJ11	6
(Netherlands) Provily Racing	3	(Netherlands) Joey van Splunteren	G	Mygale SJ07	5
(Netherlands) Provily Racing	33	(Netherlands) Joey van Splunteren	G	Mygale SJ07	4
(Netherlands) Provily Racing	5	(Netherlands) Michel Florie	G	Mygale SJ08	5
(Netherlands) Provily Racing	35	(Netherlands) Michel Florie	G	Mygale SJ08	4
(Netherlands) Provily Racing	8	(Netherlands) Romain Destercq	G	Mygale SJ08	5
(Netherlands) Provily Racing	38	(Netherlands) Romain Destercq	G	Mygale SJ08	4
(Netherlands) Provily Racing	34	(Netherlands) Bas Schouten	G	Mygale SJ08	4–5
(Denmark) Racingteam Vestergaard	4	(Denmark) Nils Vestergaard	G	Mygale SJ07	5
(Denmark) Racingteam Vestergaard	37	(Denmark) Nils Vestergaard	G	Mygale SJ07	4
(United Kingdom) Fluid Motorsport	5	(United Kingdom) Matt Parry	C	Van Diemen LA11	6–8
(United Kingdom) Fluid Motorsport	5	(United Kingdom) Matt Parry	C	Van Diemen LA09	1–4
(United Kingdom) Fluid Motorsport	55	(United Kingdom) Matt Parry	C	Van Diemen LA09	5
(United Kingdom) Fluid Motorsport	6	(United Kingdom) Matt Rao	S	Van Diemen LA08	4, 6–8
(Netherlands) Racing 2 Win	6	(Netherlands) Pieter Jan Cracco	G	Van Diemen DP07	5
(Netherlands) Geva Racing	7	(Netherlands) Jack Swinkels	G	Mygale SJ07	5
(Netherlands) Geva Racing	17	(Netherlands) Steijn Schothorst	G	Mygale SJ10	4–5
(Netherlands) Geva Racing	47	(Netherlands) Steijn Schothorst	G	Mygale SJ10	7–8
(Netherlands) Geva Racing	27	(Netherlands) Jelle Beelen	G	Mygale SJ09	4–5, 7–8
(Netherlands) Geva Racing	37	(Netherlands) Arthur van Uitert	G	Mygale SJ07	5
(Netherlands) Geva Racing	77	(Finland) Antti Buri	C	Mygale SJ11	5, 7–8
(United Kingdom) Raysport	12	(Finland) Jesse Anttila	C	Ray GR 09	1–3
(United Kingdom) Raysport	12	(Finland) Jesse Anttila	C	Ray GR 11	4
(United Kingdom) Raysport	51	(Finland) Ville Kivinen	C	Ray GR 11	3
(United Kingdom) Rendez-Vous Racing / Enigma Motorsport	13	(France) Philippe Layac	C	Mygale SJ10	All
(United Kingdom) Rendez-Vous Racing / Enigma Motorsport	58	(United Kingdom) Linton Stutely	G	Mygale SJ07	6
(United Kingdom) Getem Racing	15	(United Kingdom) Cavan Corcoran	S	Mygale SJ07	1–4
(Republic of Ireland) Cliff Dempsey Racing	15	(United Kingdom) Cavan Corcoran	S	Ray GR 10	6–7
(Republic of Ireland) Cliff Dempsey Racing	20	(United States) Spencer Pigot	G	Ray GR 11	8
(Republic of Ireland) Cliff Dempsey Racing	22	(United States) Neil Alberico	C	Ray GR 11	1, 6–8
(Republic of Ireland) Cliff Dempsey Racing	22	(United States) Neil Alberico	C	Ray GR 10	2–5
(Republic of Ireland) Cliff Dempsey Racing	23	(United Kingdom) Jonny McMullan	C	Ray GR 11	1–2
(Republic of Ireland) Cliff Dempsey Racing	25	(France) Alexandre Cougnaud	G	Ray GR 11	4
(United Kingdom) Luke Williams Racing	17	(United Kingdom) Luke Williams	C	Mygale SJ10	1–2, 6–8
(United Kingdom) JTR	18	(United Kingdom) Max Marshall	S	Mygale SJ09	7–8
(United Kingdom) JTR	19	(United Kingdom) Dan de Zille	C	Mygale SJ11	All
(United Kingdom) JTR	28	(Australia) Geoff Uhrhane	C	Mygale SJ09	1
(United Kingdom) JTR	28	(Australia) Geoff Uhrhane	C	Mygale SJ11	2–8
(United Kingdom) JTR	29	(United Kingdom) Tristan Mingay	C	Mygale SJ09	1–4, 6–8
(Denmark) Egebart Motorsport	21	(Denmark) Jesper Egebart	G	Ray GR 08	4
(United Kingdom) Tockwith Motorsports	24	(United Kingdom) Jake Jackson	S	Ray GR 08	1–2
(United Kingdom) Tockwith Motorsports	25	(United Kingdom) David Moore	S	Ray GR 08	1–2
(Belgium) John's Racing Team	32	(Belgium) John Svensson	G	Van Diemen DP06	4–5
(United Kingdom) Race Car Consultants	39	(United Kingdom) David Ellesley	C	Juno JA2010	1–4
(Netherlands) MV2T	75	(Netherlands) Thomas Crancourt	G	Mygale SJ01	5
(Finland) LMS Racing	77	(Finland) Antti Buri	C	Mygale SJ08	1–3
(Finland) LMS Racing	77	(Finland) Antti Buri	C	Mygale SJ11	4, 6

Icon	Class
C	Championship
S	Scholarship
G	Guest

== Race calendar and results ==
Round		Circuit	Date	Pole position	Fastest lap	Winning driver	Winning team	Supporting
1	R1	(United Kingdom) Silverstone National	9 April	(Netherlands) Jeroen Slaghekke	(Netherlands) Jeroen Slaghekke	(United Kingdom) Scott Malvern	(United Kingdom) Jamun Racing	n/a
1	R2	(United Kingdom) Silverstone National	10 April	(Australia) Geoff Uhrhane	(United Kingdom) Scott Malvern	(Netherlands) Jeroen Slaghekke	(United Kingdom) Jamun Racing	n/a
1	R3	(United Kingdom) Silverstone National	10 April	(Australia) Geoff Uhrhane	(Australia) Geoff Uhrhane	(Australia) Geoff Uhrhane	(United Kingdom) JTR	n/a
2	R1	(United Kingdom) Oulton Park	23 April	(United Kingdom) Scott Malvern	(United Kingdom) Scott Malvern	(United Kingdom) Scott Malvern	(United Kingdom) Jamun Racing	British F3 / British GT
2	R2	(United Kingdom) Oulton Park	25 April	(United Kingdom) Scott Malvern	(United Kingdom) Scott Malvern	(United Kingdom) Scott Malvern	(United Kingdom) Jamun Racing	British F3 / British GT
2	R3	(United Kingdom) Oulton Park	25 April	(United Kingdom) Scott Malvern	(United Kingdom) Scott Malvern	(United Kingdom) Scott Malvern	(United Kingdom) Jamun Racing	British F3 / British GT
3	R1	(United Kingdom) Snetterton Motor Racing Circuit	14 May	(Australia) Geoff Uhrhane	(United Kingdom) Scott Malvern	(United Kingdom) Scott Malvern	(United Kingdom) Jamun Racing	British F3 / British GT
3	R2	(United Kingdom) Snetterton Motor Racing Circuit	15 May	(Australia) Geoff Uhrhane	(Netherlands) Jeroen Slaghekke	(United Kingdom) Scott Malvern	(United Kingdom) Jamun Racing	British F3 / British GT
3	R3	(United Kingdom) Snetterton Motor Racing Circuit	15 May	(Australia) Geoff Uhrhane	(United Kingdom) Scott Malvern	(United Kingdom) Scott Malvern	(United Kingdom) Jamun Racing	British F3 / British GT
4	R1	(United Kingdom) Brands Hatch GP	18 June	(United Kingdom) Scott Malvern	(United Kingdom) Scott Malvern	(United Kingdom) Scott Malvern	(United Kingdom) Jamun Racing	British F3 / British GT
4	R2	(United Kingdom) Brands Hatch GP	18 June	(United Kingdom) Scott Malvern	(Australia) Nick McBride	(United Kingdom) Scott Malvern	(United Kingdom) Jamun Racing	British F3 / British GT
4	R3	(United Kingdom) Brands Hatch GP	19 June	(Australia) Nick McBride	(United Kingdom) Scott Malvern	(United Kingdom) Scott Malvern	(United Kingdom) Jamun Racing	British F3 / British GT
5	R1	(Netherlands) Circuit Park Zandvoort	13 August	(United Kingdom) Scott Malvern	(Australia) Geoff Uhrhane	(United Kingdom) Scott Malvern	(United Kingdom) Jamun Racing	Masters of Formula 3
5	R2	(Netherlands) Circuit Park Zandvoort	13 August	(United Kingdom) Scott Malvern	(United Kingdom) Scott Malvern	(United Kingdom) Scott Malvern	(United Kingdom) Jamun Racing	Masters of Formula 3
5	R3	(Netherlands) Circuit Park Zandvoort	14 August	(United Kingdom) Scott Malvern	(Netherlands) Michel Florie	(Netherlands) Joey van Splunteren	(Netherlands) Provily Racing	Masters of Formula 3
6	R1	(United Kingdom) Brands Hatch Indy	3 September	(Netherlands) Jeroen Slaghekke	(Finland) Antti Buri	(United Kingdom) Scott Malvern	(United Kingdom) Jamun Racing	DTM
6	R2	(United Kingdom) Brands Hatch Indy	4 September	(Netherlands) Jeroen Slaghekke	(United Kingdom) Scott Malvern	(Netherlands) Jeroen Slaghekke	(United Kingdom) Jamun Racing	DTM
6	R3	(United Kingdom) Brands Hatch Indy	4 September	(Netherlands) Jeroen Slaghekke	(Netherlands) Jeroen Slaghekke	(United Kingdom) Scott Malvern	(United Kingdom) Jamun Racing	DTM
7	R1	(United Kingdom) Donington Park	24 September	(United Kingdom) Scott Malvern	(Australia) Nick McBride	(United Kingdom) Scott Malvern	(United Kingdom) Jamun Racing	British F3 / British GT
7	R2	(United Kingdom) Donington Park	25 September	(United Kingdom) Scott Malvern	(Australia) Nick McBride	(Australia) Nick McBride	(United Kingdom) Jamun Racing	British F3 / British GT
7	R3	(United Kingdom) Donington Park	25 September	(United Kingdom) Scott Malvern	(United Kingdom) Matt Parry	(United Kingdom) Scott Malvern	(United Kingdom) Jamun Racing	British F3 / British GT
8	R1	(United Kingdom) Silverstone Arena	8 October	(Netherlands) Jeroen Slaghekke	(Netherlands) Jeroen Slaghekke	(Australia) Geoff Uhrhane	(United Kingdom) JTR	British F3 / British GT
8	R2	(United Kingdom) Silverstone Arena	9 October	(United Kingdom) Scott Malvern	(Netherlands) Jeroen Slaghekke	(United Kingdom) Scott Malvern	(United Kingdom) Jamun Racing	British F3 / British GT
8	R3	(United Kingdom) Silverstone Arena	9 October	(Australia) Geoff Uhrhane	(United Kingdom) Scott Malvern	(Netherlands) Jeroen Slaghekke	(United Kingdom) Jamun Racing	British F3 / British GT

== Championship standings ==
In the Championship Class, points were awarded on a 30-27-24-22-20-18-16-14-12-10-8-6-4-3-2 basis to the top fifteen classified drivers, with one point awarded to all other finishers. In the Scholarship Class, points were awarded 30-27-24-22-20-18-16-14-12-10-8-6-4-2-1 basis. An additional point was given to the driver who set the fastest lap in each race, in both classes.

=== Drivers' Championships ===
Pos	Driver	SIL (United Kingdom)			OUL (United Kingdom)			SNE (United Kingdom)			BRH (United Kingdom)			ZAN (Netherlands)			BRH (United Kingdom)			DON (United Kingdom)			SIL (United Kingdom)			Points
Championship Class
1	(United Kingdom) Scott Malvern	1	Ret	Ret	1	1	1	1	1	1	1	1	1	1	1	4	1	10	1	1	2	1	Ret	1	3	614
2	(Netherlands) Jeroen Slaghekke	5	1	3	2	5	3	2	3	4	DNS	6	DNS	4	14	9	2	1	3	3	3	Ret	2	2	1	510
3	(Australia) Nick McBride	3	Ret	4	3	2	5	3	6	2	7	3	2	6	4	6	5	Ret	5	2	1	3	5	4	6	507
4	(Finland) Antti Buri	4	Ret	5	4	4	2	4	7	3	2	4	Ret	2	2	5	3	3	4	Ret	5	5	3	5	5	480
5	(Australia) Geoff Uhrhane	2	11	1	5	12	4	Ret	2	Ret	DNS	2	3	5	10	Ret	Ret	Ret	2	Ret	4	2	1	3	2	391
6	(United Kingdom) Dan de Zille	11	2	2	6	3	9	8	4	Ret	3	7	Ret	Ret	6	14	8	2	8	4	6	7	DSQ	6	4	383
7	(France) Philippe Layac	10	4	Ret	9	6	Ret	6	9	Ret	6	8	5	15	18	16	6	9	Ret	10	10	10	7	8	10	294
8	(United Kingdom) Matt Parry	14	9	8	Ret	Ret	6	Ret	5	8	12	Ret	12	Ret	5	7	DSQ	6	7	5	7	4	11	7	11	291
9	(United States) Neil Alberico	13	10	9	8	Ret	7	5	10	Ret	4	10	6	14	7	Ret	Ret	Ret	11	7	13	8	8	11	8	268
10	(Australia) Spike Goddard	6	6	7	7	8	10	11	Ret	Ret	DNS	16	17	11	Ret	15	11	5	Ret	11	8	12	9	15	14	246
11	(United Kingdom) Tristan Mingay	7	3	10	11	Ret	Ret	7	12	Ret	Ret	5	14				4	8	9	Ret	Ret	9	4	Ret	9	214
12	(United Kingdom) Jake Cook	9	7	11	DNS	9	15	Ret	8	7	14	11	15	8	9	12										170
13	(United Kingdom) Luke Williams	Ret	12	6	10	10	DSQ										DNS	4	6	6	Ret	11	Ret	10	16	132
14	(Finland) Jesse Anttila	8	5	Ret	Ret	13	11	Ret	11	5	9	13	4													122
15	(United Kingdom) David Ellesley	17	13	12	15	Ret	14	10	15	9	18	Ret	DNS													64
16	(United Kingdom) Jonny McMullan	Ret	Ret	Ret	13	7	8																			36
17	(Finland) Ville Kivinen							12	14	10																24
Guest drivers ineligible for points
	(Netherlands) Joey van Splunteren										10	9	7	3	16	1										0
	(Netherlands) Michel Florie										15	15	18	9	12	2										0
	(Netherlands) Bas Schouten										11	Ret	10	7	3	3										0
	(Netherlands) Steijn Schothorst										5	18	Ret	10	13	10				8	9	6	10	Ret	15	0
	(Australia) Jack Le Brocq																						6	9	7	0
	(United Kingdom) Chrissy Palmer																Ret	7	10							0
	(United Kingdom) Linton Stutely																7	Ret	Ret							0
	(Netherlands) Jack Swinkels													19	8	8										0
	(Denmark) Nils Vestergaard										8	Ret	9	13	11	11										0
	(Denmark) Jesper Egebart										13	12	8													0
	(Netherlands) Jelle Beelen										19	17	13	Ret	Ret	13				9	Ret	DNS	15	14	13	0
	(France) Alexandre Cougnaud										17	Ret	11													0
	(United States) Spencer Pigot																						13	12	12	0
	(Belgium) John Svensson										Ret	Ret	DNS	12	Ret	Ret										0
	(South Africa) Robert Wolk																						12	Ret	Ret	0
	(Netherlands) Pieter Jan Cracco													16	15	19										0
	(Netherlands) Romain Destercq										21	Ret	19	Ret	17	17										0
	(Netherlands) Arthur van Uitert													17	19	18										0
	(Netherlands) Thomas Crancourt													18	20	20										0
Scholarship Class
1	(United Kingdom) Cavan Corcoran	12	8	13	12	11	12	9	13	6	16	14	16				9	11	Ret	Ret	11	13				496
2	(United Kingdom) Matt Rao										20	NC	20				10	12	DNS	13	14	Ret	16	16	17	243
3	(United Kingdom) Max Marshall																			12	12	14	14	13	Ret	149
4	(United Kingdom) David Moore	15	Ret	14	14	14	13																			135
5	(United Kingdom) Jake Jackson	16	14	Ret	16	Ret	DNS																			75
Pos	Driver	SIL (United Kingdom)			OUL (United Kingdom)			SNE (United Kingdom)			BRH (United Kingdom)			ZAN (Netherlands)			BRH (United Kingdom)			DON (United Kingdom)			SIL (United Kingdom)			Points

Colour	Result
Gold	Winner
Silver	Second place
Bronze	Third place
Green	Points classification
Blue	Non-points classification
Blue	Non-classified finish (NC)
Purple	Retired, not classified (Ret)
Red	Did not qualify (DNQ)
Red	Did not pre-qualify (DNPQ)
Black	Disqualified (DSQ)
White	Did not start (DNS)
White	Withdrew (WD)
White	Race cancelled (C)
Blank	Did not practice (DNP)
Blank	Did not arrive (DNA)
Blank	Excluded (EX)

=== Constructors ===
Pos	Constructor	SIL (United Kingdom)			OUL (United Kingdom)			SNE (United Kingdom)			BRH (United Kingdom)			ZAN (Netherlands)			BRH (United Kingdom)			DON (United Kingdom)			SIL (United Kingdom)			Points
1	(France) Mygale	1	1	1	1	1	1	1	1	1	1	1	1	1	1	4	1	1	1	1	1	1	1	1	1	192
2	(United Kingdom) Ray	8	5	9	8	7	7	5	10	5	4	10	4	14	7	Ret	9	11	11	7	11	8	8	11	8	151
3	(United Kingdom) Van Diemen	14	9	8	Ret	Ret	6	Ret	5	8	12	NC	12	Ret	5	7	10	6	7	5	7	4	11	7	11	125
4	(United Kingdom) Juno	17	13	12	15	Ret	14	10	15	9	18	Ret	DNS													47
Pos	Constructor	SIL (United Kingdom)			OUL (United Kingdom)			SNE (United Kingdom)			BRH (United Kingdom)			ZAN (Netherlands)			BRH (United Kingdom)			DON (United Kingdom)			SIL (United Kingdom)			Points

=== Teams ===
Pos	Team	SIL (United Kingdom)			OUL (United Kingdom)			SNE (United Kingdom)			BRH (United Kingdom)			ZAN (Netherlands)			BRH (United Kingdom)			DON (United Kingdom)			SIL (United Kingdom)			Points
1	(United Kingdom) Jamun Racing	1	Ret	3	1	1	1	1	1	1	1	1	1	1	1	4	1	1	1	1	1	1	2	1	1	1119
1	(United Kingdom) Jamun Racing	3	Ret	Ret	2	5	3	2	3	4	DNS	6	DNS	4	14	9	5	10	3	3	2	Ret	Ret	2	3	1119
2	(United Kingdom) JTR	2	3	1	5	3	4	8	2	Ret	3	2	3	5	6	14	8	2	2	4	4	2	1	3	2	871
2	(United Kingdom) JTR	11	11	2	6	12	9	Ret	4	Ret	DNS	7	Ret	Ret	10	Ret	Ret	Ret	8	Ret	6	7	DSQ	6	4	871
3	(United Kingdom) Fluid Motorsport	14	9	8	Ret	Ret	6	Ret	5	8	12	NC	12	Ret	5	7	10	6	7	5	7	4	11	7	11	528
3	(United Kingdom) Fluid Motorsport										20	Ret	20				DSQ	12	DNS	13	14	Ret	16	16	17	528
4	(Republic of Ireland) Cliff Dempsey Racing	13	10	9	8	7	7	5	10	Ret	4	10	6	14	7	Ret	9	11	11	7	11	8	9	11	8	508
4	(Republic of Ireland) Cliff Dempsey Racing	Ret	Ret	Ret	13	Ret	8				17	Ret	11				Ret	Ret	Ret	Ret	13	13	13	12	12	508
5	(United Kingdom) Raysport	8	5	Ret	Ret	13	11	12	11	5	9	13	4													235
5	(United Kingdom) Raysport							Ret	14	10																235
6	(United Kingdom) Getem Racing	12	8	13	12	11	12	9	13	6	16	14	16													220
Pos	Team	SIL (United Kingdom)			OUL (United Kingdom)			SNE (United Kingdom)			BRH (United Kingdom)			ZAN (Netherlands)			BRH (United Kingdom)			DON (United Kingdom)			SIL (United Kingdom)			Points

=== Nations Cup ===
Pos	Nation	SIL (United Kingdom)			OUL (United Kingdom)			SNE (United Kingdom)			BRH (United Kingdom)			ZAN (Netherlands)			BRH (United Kingdom)			DON (United Kingdom)			SIL (United Kingdom)			Points
1	Australia	2	6	1	3	2	4	3	2	2	7	2	2	5	4	6	5	5	2	2	1	2	1	3	2	662
2	Finland	4	5	5	4	4	2	4	7	3	2	4	4	2	2	5	3	3	4	Ret	5	5	3	5	5	606
3	Netherlands	5	1	3	2	5	3	2	3	4	DNS	6	DNS	4	14	9	2	1	3	3	3	6	2	2	1	568
4	France	10	4	Ret	9	6	Ret	6	9	Ret	6	8	5	15	18	16	6	9	Ret	10	10	10	7	8	10	439
5	United States	13	10	9	8	Ret	7	5	10	Ret	4	10	6	14	7	Ret	Ret	Ret	11	7	13	8	8	11	8	415
Guest nations ineligible for points
	Denmark										8	12	8	13	11	11										0
	Belgium										Ret	Ret	DNS	12	Ret	Ret										0
	South Africa																						12	Ret	Ret	0
Pos	Nation	SIL (United Kingdom)			OUL (United Kingdom)			SNE (United Kingdom)			BRH (United Kingdom)			ZAN (Netherlands)			BRH (United Kingdom)			DON (United Kingdom)			SIL (United Kingdom)			Points
