= Jake Eidson =

American Australian racing driver

- Nationality: (United States) American (Australia) Australian
- Born: May 24, 1995 (age 31) Littleton, Colorado, United States

Previous series
- 2013-2015 2013 2011-2013 2011 2010-2011: USF2000; F1600 Championship Series; Formula Skip Barber; New South Wales Formula Ford 1600; Karting

Championship titles
- 2013 2012-2013 2012: F1600 Championship Series; Skip Barber Winter Series; Skip Barber Summer Series

Awards
- 2013: Team USA Scholarship

Jake Eidson (born 24 May 1995) is an American-Australian former racing driver. Eidson is a triple Formula Skip Barber championship winner and won the 2013 F1600 Championship Series season.

== Career ==
Eidson started his racing career in karts. He won the 2010 Rocky Mountain Challenge in the TAG Jr. class running with the Superkarts! USA organisation. In 2011, Eidson ran four races in the New South Wales Formula Ford 1600 championship. He drove a Van Diemen RF91 and scored one podium finish.

In 2012, Eidson made the switch to single-seater racing in the United States of America. He competed in the Skip Barber F2000 Series racing a Mazda powered Reynard R/T 2000. Eidson was highly successful. The Colorado native won the Winter Series, Summer Series and the subsequent Winter Series championships. The following year, Eidson joined Cape Motorsports w/ Wayne Taylor Racing for their F1600 Championship Series campaign. At the beginning of the season, he competed in the USF2000 Winterfest and the first two rounds of the main championship in Florida. Eidson dominated the F1600 season in the Honda L15A7 powered Spectrum 012, winning seven out of twelve races.

For his good results, Eidson was awarded a place in the Team USA Scholarship to compete at the Formula Ford Festival and Walter Hayes Trophy in England. At the Formula Ford Festival, the team competed in the highly competitive Kent class. Eidson won one of the qualifying rounds. In the main event, the Team USA Scholarship driver finished fifth, outscoring his teammate Joey Bickers. At the Walter Hayes Trophy, Eidson finished both qualifying rounds in second place, which granted him the second starting position for the main event. Scott Malvern won the race while Eidson finished in seventh position.

2014 was his first full season in the USF2000. Again competing for Cape Motorsports w/ Wayne Taylor Racing Eidson won two races. Eidson was placed third in the championship standings behind Team E Racing's RC Enerson and Cape Motorsports teammate Florian Latorre.

=== U.S. F2000 National Championship ===
| Year | Team | 1 | 2 | 3 | 4 | 5 | 6 | 7 | 8 | 9 | 10 | 11 | 12 | 13 | 14 | 15 | 16 | Rank | Points |
|---|---|---|---|---|---|---|---|---|---|---|---|---|---|---|---|---|---|---|---|
| 2013 | Afterburner Autosport | SEB; 6 | SEB; 24 | STP; 12 | STP; 23 | LOR | TOR | TOR | MOH | MOH | MOH | LAG | LAG | HOU | HOU | | | 26th | 26 |
| 2014 | Cape Motorsports Wayne Taylor Racing | STP; 4 | STP; 2 | BAR; 3 | BAR; 8 | IMS; 2 | IMS; 9 | LOR; 9 | TOR; 1 | TOR; 2 | MOH; 4 | MOH; 1 | MOH; 8 | SNM; 3 | SNM; 3 | | | 3rd | 291 |
| 2015 | Pabst Racing Services | STP; 1 | STP; 1 | NOL; 3 | NOL; 3 | BAR; 3 | BAR; 3 | IMS; 2 | IMS; 12 | LOR; 1 | TOR; 1 | TOR; 2 | MOH; 4 | MOH; 2 | MOH; 3 | LAG; 3 | LAG; 3 | 2nd | 385 |

=== Pro Mazda Championship ===
| Year | Team | 1 | 2 | 3 | 4 | 5 | 6 | 7 | 8 | 9 | 10 | 11 | 12 | 13 | 14 | 15 | 16 | Rank | Points |
|---|---|---|---|---|---|---|---|---|---|---|---|---|---|---|---|---|---|---|---|
| 2016 | Cape Motorsports Wayne Taylor Racing | STP; 3 | STP; 7 | ALA; 8 | ALA; 6 | IMS; 6 | IMS; 7 | LOR; 8 | ROA | ROA | TOR | TOR | MOH | MOH | LAG | LAG | LAG | 9th | 106 |
