= Michael Epps =

British-New Zealand racing driver (born 1992)

- Nationality: (United Kingdom) British (New Zealand) New Zealander via dual nationality
- Born: 12 March 1992 (age 34) Hemel Hempstead, Hertfordshire, UK

British Touring Car Championship career
- Debut season: 2016
- Current team: Autoaid/RCIB Insurance Racing
- Car number: 12
- Starts: 60
- Wins: 0
- Poles: 0
- Fastest laps: 0
- Best finish: 18th in 2017

Previous series
- 2015 2014 2014 2013 2012 2012 2011 2007–2011: Volkswagen Racing Cup; Protyre Formula Renault Championship; U.S. F2000 Winterfest; U.S. F2000 National Championship; Formula Renault BARC Winter Series; Formula Renault BARC; 750MC Formula Vee Championship; Karting

Michael Epps (born 12 March 1992) is a British-New Zealand racing driver who currently is a coach at DW Driver Management, managing Thomas Ingram Hill. Epps has competed in the British Touring Car Championship in 2016 and 2017 for Team HARD.

Due to budget issues, Epps was unable to continue in the BTCC and raced the supporting Renault UK Clio Cup in 2018 and Ginetta G55 in 2019.

== Racing career ==
Epps began his career in karting in 2007, he raced in karting up until 2011, where he switched to the 750MC Formula Vee Championship. He went on to finish 2nd in the championship standings that season. He switched to the Formula Renault BARC championship in 2012, he finished 13th in the championship that year. He also raced in the Formula Renault BARC Winter Series that year, finishing tenth in the standings.

For 2013, Epps switched to the U.S. F2000 National Championship, finishing the season 13th in the championship standings.

Epps started the 2014 season in the U.S. F2000 Winterfest, finishing 2nd in the championship standings with two wins, four podiums and two pole positions. He also made a one-off return to Formula Renault in the rebranded Protyre Formula Renault Championship.

Epps switched to Volkswagen Racing Cup for 2015, finishing eighth in the championship standings. with four wins.

In March 2016, it was announced that Epps would make his British Touring Car Championship debut with RCIB Insurance Racing driving a Toyota Avensis.

== Racing record ==
=== Complete British Touring Car Championship results ===
(key) (Races in bold indicate pole position – 1 point awarded just in first race; races in italics indicate fastest lap – 1 point awarded all races; * signifies that driver led race for at least one lap – 1 point given all races)

Year	Team	Car	1	2	3	4	5	6	7	8	9	10	11	12	13	14	15	16	17	18	19	20	21	22	23	24	25	26	27	28	29	30	DC	Pts
2016	RCIB Insurance Racing	Toyota Avensis	BRH; 1; 20	BRH; 2; 17	BRH; 3; 21	DON; 1; 19	DON; 2; 24	DON; 3; 13	THR; 1; 11	THR; 2; 14	THR; 3; 10	OUL; 1; 25	OUL; 2; 16	OUL; 3 Ret	CRO; 1; 14	CRO; 2 Ret	CRO; 3; 15	SNE; 1; 20	SNE; 2; 19	SNE; 3; 20	KNO; 1; 19	KNO; 2 Ret	KNO; 3; 20	ROC; 1; 18	ROC; 2 Ret	ROC; 3; 23	SIL; 1; 18	SIL; 2; 12	SIL; 3; 16	BRH; 1; 16	BRH; 2; 16	BRH; 3; 25	24th	24
2017	Autoaid RCIB Insurance Racing	Volkswagen CC	BRH; 1; 9	BRH; 2; 10	BRH; 3; 9	DON; 1 Ret	DON; 2; 23	DON; 3; 21	THR; 1; 25	THR; 2; 18	THR; 3; 20	OUL; 1; 11	OUL; 2; 10	OUL; 3; 8	CRO; 1; 22	CRO; 2; 12	CRO; 3 Ret	SNE; 1 Ret	SNE; 2; 18	SNE; 3 Ret	KNO; 1; 24	KNO; 2; 17	KNO; 3; 23	ROC; 1; 15	ROC; 2 Ret	ROC; 3; 19	SIL; 1; 10	SIL; 2; 10	SIL; 3; 12	BRH; 1; 18	BRH; 2; 10	**BRH**; **3**; 5	18th	77

=== Complete Britcar results ===
(key) (Races in bold indicate pole position in class – 1 point awarded just in first race; races in italics indicate fastest lap in class – 1 point awarded all races;-

Year	Team	Car	Class	1	2	3	4	5	6	7	8	9	10	11	12	13	14	15	16	DC	CP	Points
2019	Team HARD	Ginetta G55 Supercup	3Inv	SIL; 1	SIL; 2	SIL; 1	SIL; 2	BRH; 1	BRH; 2	DON; 1	DON; 2	OUL; 1	OUL; 2	SNE; 1	SNE; 2	OUL; 1	OUL; 2	**BRH**; **2** Ret	BRH; 1; 9	NC†	NC†	0†

† Epps was ineligible for points as he was an invitation entry.
