= Peter Portante =

American racing driver (born 1996)

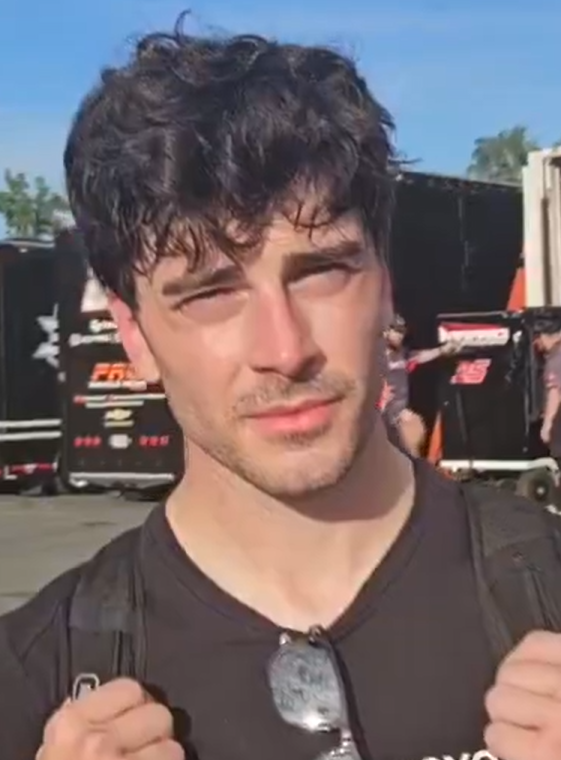
- Portante at Lime Rock Park in 2026
- Born: February 24, 1996 (age 30) Plainville, Connecticut, U.S.
- Categorisation: FIA Silver

Previous series
- 2013–2015: U.S. F2000 National Championship

ARCA Menards Series career
- 1 race run over 1 year
- Best finish: 95th (2026)
- First race: 2026 Lime Rock Park ARCA 100 (Lime Rock)
Wins	Top tens	Poles
0	0	0
- Statistics up to date as of September 26, 2026.

Peter Portante (born February 24, 1996) is an American racing driver. He last competed part-time in the ARCA Menards Series, driving the No. 25 Toyota for Nitro Motorsports.

== Career ==
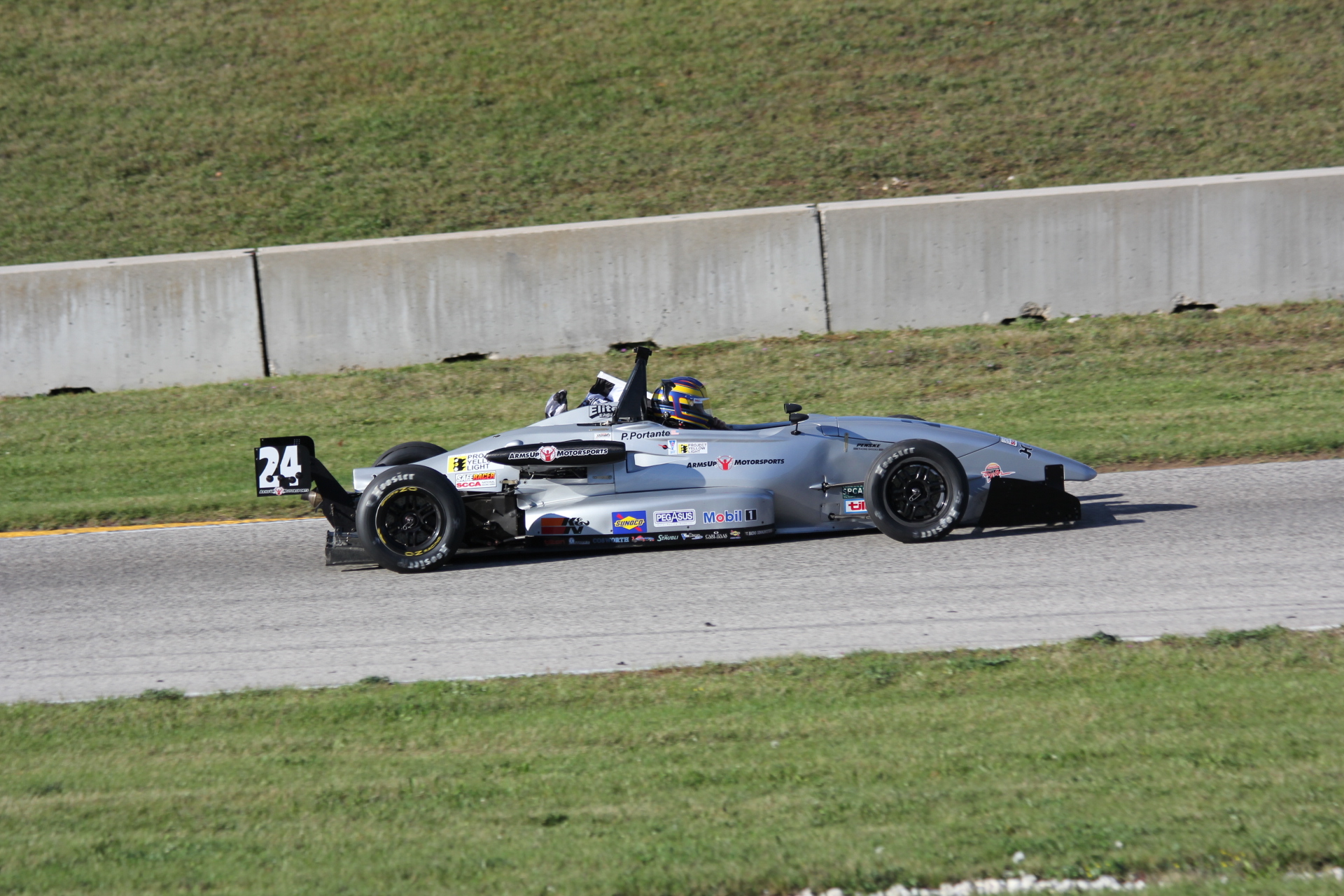
Portante after winning the Formula Continental at the 2013 SCCA National Championship runoffs.

Portante started his racing career at the age of seven in karts. He quickly established himself as one of the up & coming drivers in the Northeast with the securing of many pole positions and wins on the Legend Car oval circuit and in the NASCAR Late Model division at Stafford Speedway. Catching the open wheel bug, Portante joined the Skip Barber Race Series in 2012 to hone his race craft. After claiming three wins, and a top-ten finish in the series points, Portante was invited to attend the Skip Barber Race Series Championship Shootout for a chance at a scholarship to become a Mazdaspeed backed driver. Portante emerged from the shootout with a scholarship to the 2013 Cooper Tires U.S. F2000 National Championship Powered by Mazda. After signing with Belardi Auto Racing for the 2013 season, he earned two podium finishes as well as several top-ten finishes. Adding to his resume in 2013, Portante won the SCCA Formula Continental National Championship with ArmsUp Motorsports.

Portante raced in the 2014 U.S. F2000 National Championship for ArmsUp Motorsports, where he improved to sixth in the championship and scored a career-best second-place finish at the Mid-Ohio Sports Car Course.

In 2026, it was revealed that Portante would make his debut in the ARCA Menards Series at Lime Rock Park, driving the No. 25 Toyota for Nitro Motorsports.

== Racing record ==
=== Career summary ===
Season	Series	Team	Races	Wins	Poles	F/Laps	Podiums	Points	Position
2009	Allison Legacy Series		1	0	?	?	0	36	14th
2011	Allison Legacy North		?	?	?	?	?	?	**1st**
2012	Skip Barber Summer Series		17	3	8	1	4	492	6th
2012	SBF2000 Winter Series		4	0	0	0	0	69	32nd
2013	U.S. F2000 National Championship	Belardi Auto Racing	14	0	0	0	2	139	10th
2013	U.S. F2000 Winterfest	Belardi Auto Racing	5	0	0	0	0	58	9th
2013	SBF2000 Winter Series		6	0	?	?	2	161	19th
2013	SCCA National Championship Runoffs - Formula Continental		1	1	1	1	1	N/A	**1st**
2014	U.S. F2000 National Championship	ArmsUp Motorsports	14	0	0	1	2	173	6th
2014	U.S. F2000 Winterfest	ArmsUp Motorsports	3	0	0	0	0	42	15th
2015	U.S. F2000 National Championship	ArmsUp Motorsports	2	0	0	0	0	26	20th
2015	Mazda MX-5 Cup - MX		12	0	0	?	5	552	5th
2016	F1600 Championship Series	K-Hill Motorsports	21	3	8	5	11	742	**2nd**
2017	Atlantic Championship	K-Hill Motorsports	12	7	3	5	11	587	**1st**
2017	F2000 Championship Series		1	1	1	0	1	55	24th
2018	Atlantic Championship		1	0	0	0	0	?	?
2018	F3 Americas Championship	Importante Autosport	3	0	0	0	0	12	7th
2020	F1600 Championship Series		3	0	0	0	0	0	–
2023	F2000 Championship Series	Cordova Motorsports	2	2	1	2	2	107	14th
2026	ARCA Menards Series	Nitro Motorsports	1	0	0	0	0	33	95th

=== U.S. F2000 National Championship ===
Year	Team	1	2	3	4	5	6	7	8	9	10	11	12	13	14	15	16	Rank	Points
2013	Belardi Auto Racing	SEB; 13	SEB; 31	STP; 10	STP; 13	LOR; 3	TOR; 11	TOR; 4	MOH; 11	MOH; 3	MOH; 18	LAG; 23	LAG; 12	HOU; 19	HOU; 6			**10th**	**139**
2014	ArmsUp Motorsports	STP; 13	STP; 15	BAR; 12	BAR; 6	IMS; 6	IMS; 7	LOR; 7	TOR; 4	TOR; 19	MOH; 3	MOH; 15	MOH; 2	SNM; 4	SNM; 17			**6th**	**173**
2015	ArmsUp Motorsports	STP	STP	NOL	NOL	BAR	BAR	IMS	IMS	LOR	TOR	TOR	MOH	MOH	MOH	LAG; 10	LAG; 6	**20th**	**26**

=== ARCA Menards Series ===
(key) (Bold – Pole position awarded by qualifying time. Italics – Pole position earned by points standings or practice time. * – Most laps led.)

ARCA Menards Series results
Year	Team	No.	Make	1	2	3	4	5	6	7	8	9	10	11	12	13	14	15	16	17	18	19	20	AMSC	Pts	Ref
2026	Nitro Motorsports	25	Toyota	DAY	PHO	KAN	TAL	GLN	TOL	MCH	POC	BER	ELK	CHI	LRP; 11	IRP	IOW	ISF	MAD	DSF	SLM	BRI	KAN	95th	33	
