= Scott Malvern =

British racing driver

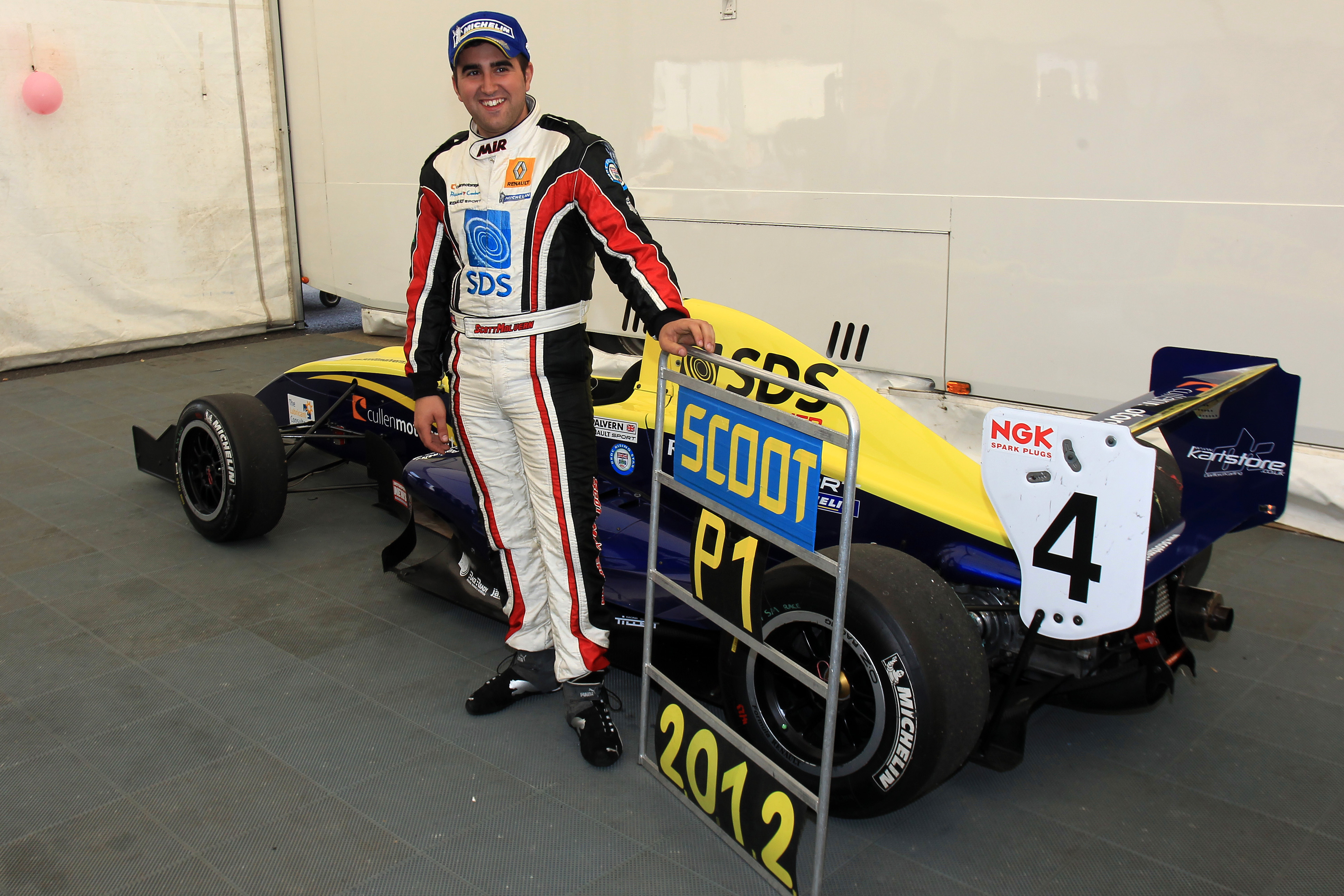
- Scott Malvern 2012 Formula Renault Champion
- Nationality: British
- Born: 23 February 1989 (age 37) Barking, United Kingdom

Formula Renault BARC career
- Debut season: 2012
- Current team: Cullen Motorsport
- Categorisation: FIA Gold (until 2019); FIA Silver (2020–)
- Car number: 4
- Former teams: Cliff Dempsey Racing
- Starts: 14
- Wins: 3
- Poles: 1
- Fastest laps: 7
- Best finish: 1st in 2012

Previous series
- 2011 2010–11 2009 2009: Formula Ford EuroCup; British Formula Ford Championship; Club Formula Ford; Irish Formula Ford 1600

Championship titles
- 2012 2011 2011 2009 2009: Formula Renault BARC; Formula Ford Festival; British Formula Ford Championship; Club Formula Ford National, Post '89; Club Formula Ford, Midland South

Awards
- 2012 2011 2010: Autosport Club Driver of the Year; BRDC Henry Surtees Award; BRDC Rising Star

Scott Aaron Malvern (born 23 February 1989) is a British racing driver, currently competing in the British GT Championship who is best known for winning the 2011 British Formula Ford Championship, the 2012 Formula Renault BARC championship and twice being nominated for the McLaren Autosport BRDC Award. Malvern was also awarded the British Racing Drivers Club Henry Surtees Award in 2011 and the Autosport Club Driver of the Year in 2012.

== Career ==
=== Karting ===
Born in Barking, Malvern attended Fairlop Primary School in Barkingside Greater London (where he grew up) and then Caterham High School in Clayhall before going on to study engineering at University whilst also working as a race mechanic. Malvern had an extensive karting career, having gained an interest in the sport when he took part in a summer holiday fun day at The Brentwood Raceway Arrive & Drive circuit near Great Warley. He made his race debut at the Buckmore Park circuit in Kent in January 1998. Malvern competed between 1998 and 2007 in various series. His first championships came in 1999 at the 60 cc Comer Cadet level, winning the BPKC Henry Moore Memorial Shield and Lydd Club Championship for Keith Baines Motorsport. He won several more club level championships but the closest he came to winning a national championship title was when he finished runner-up, for Project One Racing, in the 2005 Super 1 National Formula TKM Extreme Championship, finishing 37 points behind Adam Constable in the final championship standings. He also won the Renault Champion of Champions title in 2005. His kart career ended in December 2007 with a victory at The PF International circuit in Lincolnshire driving a Gillard chassis for Project One Racing in the popular Rotax Max class. A few days later Scott sampled a Formula Ford car for the first time with the Jamun Racing Team at Silverstone.

=== Formula Ford ===
Malvern did not race during the 2008 season, but remained involved in motorsport working as a mechanic for British Formula Ford Champions Jamun Racing based in Rochester, Kent. Along with testing the team's cars during the season, Malvern worked as number one mechanic on the car of Tim Blanchard, one of the team's drivers in that season's British Formula Ford Championship; Blanchard finished the season as runner-up to another Jamun driver, Wayne Boyd. Malvern made his race debut in a Formula Ford car, and indeed in car racing, at the start the 2009 season at the relatively late age of 20 years old, moving to the Cliff Dempsey Racing team in the Webcon UK National Formula Ford Championship. Competing in the class for cars built after 1989, Malvern was immediately competitive winning a race and finishing second on his National FF1600 debut weekend at Anglesey and also set two new lap records (the circuit used two different layouts that weekend) and then went on to win the national championship with six victories in the season's 14 races; the title was not confirmed until two months after the season-ending race at Mondello Park. He also won the Midlands South sub-championship (where he competed in only half of the ten rounds), as well as finishing third in the North West sub-championship (where he took part in just four of 10 rounds), and won a race on a guest appearance in the Irish Formula Ford 1600 series & beat hot favourite Rory Butcher to win the Jackie Stewart Golden Helmet Trophy at the Scottish Speed Festival at Knockhill. Malvern's season ended with a second-place finish to Butcher in the Kent class of the Formula Ford Festival, missing out on victory by just 0.069 seconds.

Malvern remained with Cliff Dempsey Racing as he moved into the British Formula Ford Championship for the 2010 season. In his first meeting at Oulton Park, Malvern won the second of the weekend's three races as well as finishing second in the other two races to hold the championship lead ahead of Jamun Racing's Scott Pye. Pye and Malvern maintained their title battle throughout the season; Pye won a total of 12 races during the season compared to two for Malvern—adding to his Oulton Park win with a victory at the sixth meeting of the year at Silverstone—but Malvern's greater consistency allowed him to maintain the gap to Pye. Malvern out-scored Pye over the course of the season, by 582 points to 581, on gross points scoring, but championship regulations stipulated that a driver's best 23 scores—from the 25 races scheduled—counted towards the final drivers' championship standings. As a result, Malvern had to drop a tenth-place finish from Donington Park and a 12th place at Knockhill—slowed after a collision with Pye's Jamun team-mate Josh Hill—while Pye did not have to drop points after three retirements, one of which came after a collision with Malvern; ultimately, Pye won the title by 19 points. Malvern finished the season with 14 podium finishes, and finished all bar three races in the top five placings. He finished the season with a fourth-place finish in the Duratec class of the Formula Ford Festival, and was nominated for the McLaren Autosport BRDC Award, but lost out to Formula Renault UK driver Lewis Williamson.

Having set his sights on a move into the British Formula Three Championship, Malvern remained in Formula Ford for a second season in 2011, and returned to Jamun Racing for the first time since working as a mechanic three years previously. Malvern was the dominant driver during the campaign, taking a record 17 overall victories, as well as another British series win—18 wins in total – when he was the top placed British-registered driver during one of the season's rounds at Zandvoort. He also dominated the revived Formula Ford EuroCup, held alongside the British Formula Ford season. Malvern amassed the most points at each of the four meetings scheduled—all non-championship events—amassing nine wins from the eleven races to be held over the course of the EuroCup. He rounded off the season with victory in the 40th Formula Ford Festival, becoming the first driver since Wayne Boyd in 2008 to add the Festival victory to a championship title. The victory took his season tally of wins to 27 from 33 race starts. Malvern was nominated for the McLaren Autosport BRDC Award for the second year in succession, but again lost out, this time to Formula Renault UK driver Oliver Rowland.

=== Formula Renault ===
After taking part in 2011 post-season testing in both GP3 Series and FIA Formula Two Championship machinery, budgetary concerns meant that Malvern remained in domestic formulae racing into the 2012 season; he moved into the Formula Renault BARC Championship which enjoyed a boom year with grids regularly achieving thirty plus cars largely due to the cancellation of the Formula Renault UK Championship. Top teams such as Fortec, MGR and HHC supported the championship but Malvern returned to Cliff Dempsey Racing, after one season with Jamun. With no pre-season testing, Malvern looked set for a dream debut when he gained a comfortable lead in the opening round of the championship until a gear linkage problem saw him slip down the order with just a few laps to go but he did achieve a race victory during his first meeting at Snetterton, winning the third of the weekend's races. From that point on, Malvern finished all bar two races on the podium, taking two further victories during the season at Thruxton – taking the championship lead – and Donington Park. Despite a mid-season split from Cliff Dempsey Racing, Malvern ran with Cullen Motorsport for the remainder of the season – as well as undertaking a driver coach role for the team's British Formula Ford driver Ryan Cullen – maintaining title emphasis during his first season of "slicks-and-wings" racing. Malvern entered the final round of the season with a 23-point lead over MGR Motorsport's Josh Webster, with two podiums securing him the title by 42 points on gross scores, and 33 points overall—368 points to 335—after dropped scores came into effect. Malvern's successful year was recognised by the readers of Autosport magazine who awarded him Club Driver of the Year. Previous recipients have included Lewis Hamilton, David Coulthard and Dario Franchitti.

=== Walter Hayes Trophy success and move into sports cars ===
In 2013, Malvern was forced to rely on a handful of guest appearances including the opening round of the new Ecoboost 200 Formula Ford Championship at Brands Hatch where he achieved a second place and established a new lap record. He also made a successful guest appearance in the Ariel Atom Cup at Oulton Park taking a win, a second place and two fastest laps in two races. There were high hopes that a move to the Road to Indycar ladder may be possible when he impressed highly in a test in a Formula Pro-Mazda car for Team Pelfrey at Sebring in Florida USA but sadly budget constraints made the move impossible. He finished the season by making his debut in the prestigious Walter Hayes Trophy at Silverstone, with the Kevin Mills Racing Team, and completely dominated the event leading every lap of his heat, semi final and the grand final taking victory by an emphatic margin of over eight seconds and setting a new lap record in the process.

In 2014 and 2015, Malvern made the switch to sportscar racing in the Radical UK Enduro Championship (with a couple of guest appearances in the European Championship). Malvern competed with businessman, and former Formula Ford 1600 racer Nick Jones as a Pro-Am pairing, run by the Kevin Mills Racing Team, and had some success finishing on the podium at Donington on their debut weekend and winning a race, as a solo driver, at the same circuit later in the year. In 2015, the pairing enjoyed several podiums, including a win at Rockingham Motor Speedway, and finished as the top Pro-Am pairing and third overall in the championship. In 2014, he also returned to Formula Ford to race in the Bert Ray Memorial Trophy on the Grand Prix circuit at Brands Hatch winning the event and setting a new lap record.

=== British GT ===
For 2016, Malvern has remained with Nick Jones but moved to the Simpson Motorsport Team and entered the British GT Championship in the GT4 Class. The pair have registered to campaign a new Porsche Cayman GT Clubsport but due to a delay in the delivery of the car from the Porsche factory they have begun the campaign in a borrowed Ginetta G55. So far, Malvern has recorded three fastest laps in the four races and led the class comfortably at Oulton Park until forced into the pits with a power steering problem. The pairing finally switched to the Porsche Cayman GT Clubsport from the Silverstone round but with the car in track-day spec while they await the delivery of the GT4 homologation pack. After the Silverstone round, Malvern & Jones left the Simpson Motorsport Team and joined Team Parker Racing.

== Racing record ==
=== Career summary ===
| Season | Series | Team | Races | Wins | Poles | F/Laps | Podiums | Points | Position |
|---|---|---|---|---|---|---|---|---|---|
| 2009 | National Formula Ford - Post '89 | Cliff Dempsey Racing | 14 | 6 | 2 | 6 | 12 | 221 | **1st** |
| 2009 | Midland South Club Formula Ford | Cliff Dempsey Racing | 5 | 3 | 1 | 2 | 4 | 91 | **1st** |
| 2009 | North West Club Formula Ford - Post '89 | Cliff Dempsey Racing | 4 | 2 | 1 | 3 | 4 | 71 | **3rd** |
| 2009 | Formula Ford 1600 Ireland | Cliff Dempsey Racing | 3 | 1 | 0 | 2 | 1 | N/A | NC† |
| 2009 | Formula Ford Festival - Kent class | Cliff Dempsey Racing | 1 | 0 | 0 | 1 | 1 | N/A | **2nd** |
| 2010 | British Formula Ford Championship | Cliff Dempsey Racing | 25 | 2 | 2 | 5 | 14 | 562 | **2nd** |
| 2010 | Formula Ford Festival - Duratec Class | Cliff Dempsey Racing | 1 | 0 | 0 | 0 | 0 | N/A | 4th |
| 2011 | British Formula Ford Championship | Jamun Racing | 24 | 18 | 12 | 11 | 20 | 614 | **1st** |
| 2011 | Formula Ford EuroCup | Jamun Racing | 11 | 9 | 7 | 4 | 10 | N/A (Note: Events were held separately as one-off meetings, with points not accrued over the season. Malvern was the "Weekend Winner" at each of the four meetings held.) | |
| 2011 | Formula Ford Festival - Duratec class | Jamun Racing | 1 | 1 | 1 | 0 | 1 | N/A | **1st** |
| 2012 | Formula Renault BARC | Cliff Dempsey Racing with Cullen Motorsport | 7 | 2 | 0 | 4 | 5 | 368 | **1st** |
| 2012 | Formula Renault BARC | Cullen Motorsport | 7 | 1 | 1 | 3 | 6 | 368 | **1st** |
| 2013 | British Formula Ford Championship | Jamun Racing | 3 | 0 | 0 | 2 | 1 | 45 | 17th |
| 2013 | Atom Cup | ? | 2 | 1 | 0 | 1 | 2 | N/A | NC† |
| 2013 | Walter Hayes Trophy | Kevin Mills Racing | 1 | 1 | 1 | 1 | 1 | N/A | **1st** |
| 2014 | Radical SR3 Challenge | Kevin Mills Racing | 12 | 1 | 0 | 0 | 2 | 0 | NC† |
| 2014 | Walter Hayes Trophy | ? | 1 | 0 | 0 | 0 | 0 | N/A | DNF |
| 2015 | Radical Enduro Championship | Kevin Mills Racing | 13 | 1 | 3 | 4 | 6 | 445 | **3rd** |
| 2015 | Radical European Masters - Supersport | Kevin Mills Racing | 1 | 0 | 0 | 0 | 0 | 30 | 14th |
| 2016 | British GT Championship - GT4 | Simpson Motorsport | 5 | 0 | 0 | 3 | 0 | 22.5 | 14th |
| 2016 | British GT Championship - GT4 | Team Parker Racing | 4 | 0 | 0 | 0 | 0 | 22.5 | 14th |
| 2017 | British GT Championship - GT4 | Team Parker Racing | 9 | 0 | 0 | 0 | 0 | 55 | 12th |
| 2017 | Porsche Carrera Cup GB | Redline Racing | 2 | 0 | 0 | 0 | 0 | 21 | 17th |
| 2018 | British GT Championship - GT4 | Team Parker Racing | 9 | 1 | 1 | 1 | 1 | 81.5 | 7th |
| 2019 | British GT Championship - GT4 | Team Parker Racing | 9 | 1 | 1 | 0 | 1 | 52.5 | 11th |
| 2020 | British GT Championship - GT3 | Team Parker Racing | 8 | 1 | 0 | 1 | 1 | 27 | 12th |
| 2020 | British GT Championship - GT4 | Team Parker Racing | 1 | 0 | 0 | 0 | 0 | 0 | NC† |
| 2021 | British GT Championship - GT3 | Team Parker Racing | 7 | 0 | 1 | 0 | 1 | 64 | 10th |
| 2022 | British GT Championship - GT3 | Team Parker Racing | 8 | 0 | 0 | 0 | 0 | 17 | 25th |
| 2022 | Le Mans Cup - GT3 | Team Parker Racing | 1 | 0 | 0 | 0 | 0 | 0 | NC† |
| 2022 | Porsche Carrera Cup Great Britain - Pro | Team Parker Racing | 2 | 0 | 0 | 0 | 0 | 0 | 14th |
| 2023 | Le Mans Cup - GT3 | Team Parker Racing | 7 | 0 | 0 | 0 | 3 | 63 | 5th |
| 2023 | British GT Championship - GT3 | Team Parker Racing | 1 | 0 | 0 | 0 | 0 | 0 | NC† |
| 2024 | Le Mans Cup - GT3 | High Class Racing | 2 | 0 | 0 | 0 | 0 | 20 | 9th |

^{†} As Malvern was a guest driver, he was ineligible for championship points.

=== Complete British GT Championship results ===
(key) (Races in bold indicate pole position in class) (Races in italics indicate fastest lap in class)

| Year | Entrant | Chassis | Class | 1 | 2 | 3 | 4 | 5 | 6 | 7 | 8 | 9 | 10 | DC | Points |
|---|---|---|---|---|---|---|---|---|---|---|---|---|---|---|---|
| 2016 | Simpson Motorsport | Ginetta G55 GT4 | GT4 | BRH; 1 Ret | ROC; 1; 21 | OUL; 1; 19 | OUL; 2; 21 | | | | | | | 14th | 22.5 |
| 2016 | Simpson Motorsport | Porsche Cayman Clubsport GT4 | GT4 | | | | | SIL; 1; 26 | | | | | | 14th | 22.5 |
| 2016 | Team Parker Racing | Porsche Cayman Clubsport GT4 | GT4 | | | | | | SPA; 1; 25 | SNE; 1; 25 | SNE; 2; 18 | DON; 1; 16 | | 14th | 22.5 |
| 2017 | Team Parker Racing | Porsche Cayman GT4 Clubsport MR | GT4 | OUL; 1; 17 | OUL; 2; 17 | ROC; 1; 18 | SNE; 1; 20 | SNE; 2; 15 | SIL; 1; 22 | SPA; 1 Ret | SPA; 2 DNS | BRH; 1; 15 | DON; 1; 11 | 12th | 55 |
| 2018 | Team Parker Racing | Mercedes-AMG GT4 | GT4 | OUL; 1; 33 | **OUL**; **2**; 13 | ROC; 1; 20 | SNE; 1; 15 | SNE; 2; 20 | SIL; 1; 24 | SPA; 1; 15 | BRH; 1; 11 | DON; 1; 19 | | 7th | 81.5 |
| 2019 | Team Parker Racing | Mercedes-AMG GT4 | GT4 | OUL; 1; 23 | OUL; 2; 14 | SNE; 1; 23 | **SNE**; **2**; 30 | SIL; 1; 12 | DON; 1; 35 | SPA; 1; 22 | BRH; 1; 25 | DON; 1; 30 | | 11th | 52.5 |
| 2020 | Team Parker Racing | Bentley Continental GT3 | GT3 | OUL; 1; 10 | OUL; 2 Ret | DON; 1; 11 | DON; 2; 1 | BRH; 1; 21 | DON; 1 Ret | SNE; 1; 10 | SNE; 2; 21 | | | 12th | 27 |
| 2020 | Team Parker Racing | Mercedes-AMG GT4 | GT4 | | | | | | | | | SIL; 1 Ret | | NC† | 0† |
| 2021 | Team Parker Racing | Porsche 911 GT3 R | GT3 | BRH; 1; 6 | SIL; 1; 9 | DON; 1 Ret | SPA; 1 WD | SNE; 1 DNS | SNE; 2 Ret | OUL; 1; 3 | **OUL**; **2**; 5 | DON; 1; 6 | | 10th | 64 |
| 2022 | Team Parker Racing | Porsche 911 GT3 R | GT3 | OUL; 1; 28 | OUL; 2; 11 | SIL; 1 DNS | DON; 1; 10 | SNE; 1; 12 | SNE; 2; 9 | SPA; 1; 10 | BRH; 1; 7 | DON; 1 | | 25th | 17 |
| 2023 | Team Parker Racing | Porsche 911 GT3 R (992) | GT3 | OUL; 1 | OUL; 2 | SIL; 1; 32 | DON; 1 | SNE; 1 | SNE; 2 | ALG; 1 | BRH; 1 | DON; 1 | | NC† | 0† |

^{†} As Malvern was a guest driver, he was ineligible for points.

== Notes ==
Sporting positions
| Preceded by Scott Pye | British Formula Ford Championship; Champion; 2011 | Succeeded by Antti Buri |
| Preceded by Dennis Lind | Formula Ford Festival; Winner; 2011 | Succeeded by Antti Buri |
| Preceded by Dino Zamparelli | Formula Renault BARC; Champion; 2012 | Succeeded by Chris Middlehurst |
| Preceded by Graham Johnson; Mike Robinson | British GT Championship; GT4 Pro-Am Champion; 2018; With: Nick Jones | Succeeded by Martin Plowman; Kelvin Fletcher |
Awards and achievements
| Preceded by Alex Lynn | Autosport Awards; British Club Driver of the Year; 2012 | Succeeded by Dan Cammish |
