= Florian Latorre =

French racing driver

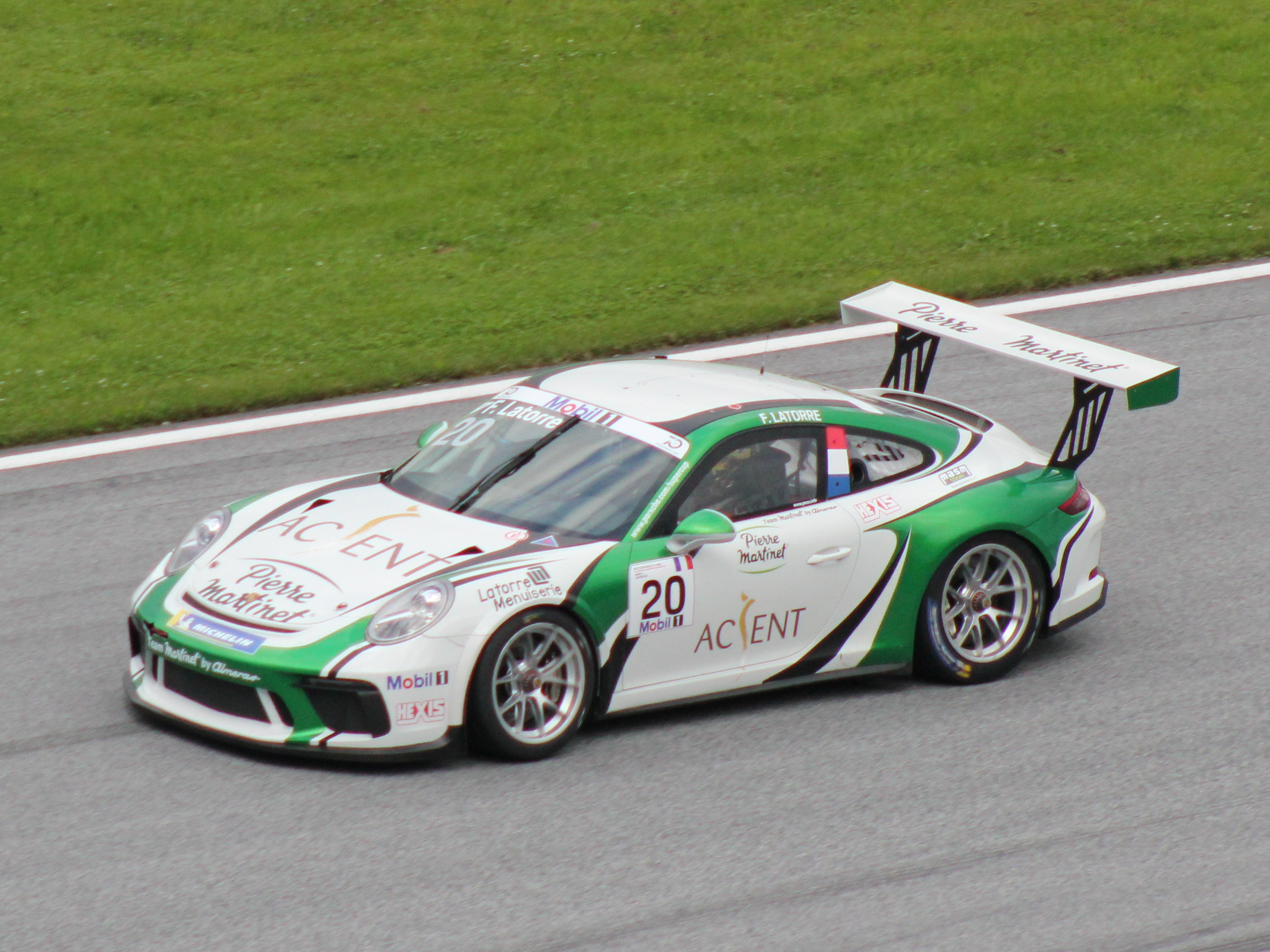
- Latorre at the Red Bull Ring in 2018
- Nationality: French
- Born: Florian Yvain Romuald Latorre; 24 April 1997 (age 29) Libourne, France
- Categorisation: FIA Silver

Florian Yvain Romuald Latorre (born April 24, 1997 in Libourne, France) is a French racing driver from Auriolles, France. He currently competes in the FIA World Endurance Championship for TF Sport.

== Career ==
Latorre made his professional debut in the 2013 U.S. F2000 National Championship. He returned and won the 2014 series championship. His championship won him a scholarship to compete in the 2015 Pro Mazda Championship season. He drove for Cape Motorsports, the team with which he won his U.S. F2000 title.

=== FIA World Endurance Championship ===
On January 19, 2022, TF Sport announced that Latorre would make a full-season return to the World Endurance championship in 2022, piloting the #33 Aston Martin Vantage AMR alongside Ben Keating and Marco Sørensen.

== Racing record ==
=== Career summary ===
Season	Series	Team	Races	Wins	Podiums	Points	Position
2012	French F4 Championship	Auto Sport Academy	14	0	0	80	8th
2013	U.S. F2000 National Championship	JAY Motorsports	14	0	2	176	6th
2013	U.S. F2000 Winterfest	JAY Motorsports	6	0	0	38	12th
2014	U.S. F2000 National Championship	Cape Motorsports Wayne Taylor Racing	7	3	5	310	**1st**
2014	U.S. F2000 National Championship	Belardi Auto Racing	7	0	3	310	**1st**
2014	U.S. F2000 Winterfest	Belardi Auto Racing	6	0	2	103	4th
2015	Pro Mazda Championship	Cape Motorsports Wayne Taylor Racing	16	1	3	222	8th
2015	Pro Mazda Winterfest	Cape Motorsports Wayne Taylor Racing	6	0	1	96	4th
2015	V de V Challenge Endurance Proto	CD Sport	1	0	0	8	37th
2016	Porsche Carrera Cup France	Sébastien Loeb Racing	12	0	0	160	**3rd**
2017	Porsche Carrera Cup France	Martinet by Alméras	11	1	0	159	**3rd**
2017	Porsche Supercup	Martinet by Alméras	2	0	0	0	NC
2018	Porsche Supercup	Martinet by Alméras	10	1	2	90	6th
2019	Porsche Supercup	Fach Auto Tech	10	0	1	87	5th
2020	Porsche Supercup	CLRT	8	0	2	105	5th
2020	GT World Challenge Europe Endurance Cup	Orange1 FFF Racing Team	3	0	0	0	NC
2020	GT World Challenge Europe Endurance Cup - Silver Cup	Orange1 FFF Racing Team	3	0	1	38	10th
2020	Porsche Carrera Cup France	CLRT	10	2	4	153	3rd
2021	Porsche Supercup	CLRT	8	0	1	61	8th
2021	Porsche Carrera Cup France	CLRT	12	1	7	217	**3rd**
2021	24 Hours of Le Mans - LMGTE Am	Proton Competition	1	0	0	N/A	DNF
2022	FIA World Endurance Championship - LMGTE Am	TF Sport	1	0	1	28	15th
2022	GT World Challenge Europe Endurance Cup	Allied-Racing	1	0	0	0	NC
2022	Porsche Supercup	CLRT	1	0	0	0	NC†
2023	Porsche Carrera Cup Asia	Meidong Racing	14	5	7	300	**1st**
2024	Porsche Carrera Cup France	ABM	10	0	0	104	8th
2024	Porsche Carrera Cup Asia	Team Jebsen	2	1	2	0	NC†
2026	Porsche Carrera Cup France	2B Autosport	12	0	0	137	6th

^{†} As Latorre was a guest driver, therefore he was ineligible for points.

=== Complete French F4 Championship results ===
(key) (Races in bold indicate pole position; races in italics indicate fastest lap)

Year	1	2	3	4	5	6	7	8	9	10	11	12	13	14	DC	Points
2012	LÉD; 1 Ret	LÉD; 2; 5	PAU; 1; 5	PAU; 2; 5	VDV; 1; 8	VDV; 2; 7	MAG; 1; 9	MAG; 2; 9	NAV; 1; 11	NAV; 2; 9	LMS; 1; 5	LMS; 2; 5	LEC; 1; 8	LEC; 2; 5	8th	80

=== American open–wheel racing results ===
==== U.S. F2000 National Championship ====
Year	Team	1	2	3	4	5	6	7	8	9	10	11	12	13	14	Rank	Points
2013	JAY Motorsports	SEB; 4	SEB; 30	STP; 5	STP; 9	LOR; 15	TOR; 2	TOR; 3	MOH; 4	MOH; 7	MOH; 22	LAG; 7	LAG; 7	HOU; 21	HOU; 10	6th	176
2014	Belardi Auto Racing	STP; 7	STP; 3	**BAR**; 2	BAR; 5	**IMS**; 4	IMS; 2	**LOR**; 6								1st	310
2014	Cape Motorsports Wayne Taylor Racing								**TOR**; 2	TOR; 1	**MOH**; 2	MOH; 4	MOH; 1	**SNM**; 21	SNM; 1	1st	310

==== Pro Mazda Championship ====
Year	Team	1	2	3	4	5	6	7	8	9	10	11	12	13	14	15	16	17	Rank	Points
2015	Cape Motorsports Wayne Taylor Racing	STP; 3	STP; 16	LOU; 5	LOU; C	BAR; 8	BAR; 5	IMS; 21	IMS; 2	IMS; 6	LOR; 8	TOR; 1	TOR; 14	IOW; 8	MOH; 5	MOH; 17	LAG; 8	LAG; 18	8th	222

=== Complete Porsche Supercup results ===
(key) (Races in bold indicate pole position) (Races in italics indicate fastest lap)

Year	Team	1	2	3	4	5	6	7	8	9	10	11	Pos.	Points
2017	Martinet by Alméras	CAT	CAT	MON	RBR	SIL	HUN	SPA	SPA	MNZ	MEX; Ret	MEX; 27†	NC	0
2018	Martinet by Alméras	CAT; 14	MON; 11	RBR; 3	SIL; 1	HOC; 12	HUN; 10	SPA; 8	MNZ; 7	MEX; 6	MEX; 7		6th	90
2019	Fach Auto Tech	CAT; 12	MON; 4	RBR; 5	SIL; 3	HOC; 5^{⹋}	HUN; 6	SPA; 5	MNZ; 9	MEX; 13	MEX; 8		5th	87
2020	CLRT	RBR; 5	RBR; 7	HUN; 6	SIL; 4	SIL; 7	CAT; 4	SPA; 3	MNZ; 2				5th	105
2021	CLRT	MON; 5	RBR; 28†	RBR; 5	HUN; 3	SPA; 28	ZND; 12	MNZ; 20	MNZ; 4				8th	61
2022	CLRT	IMO	MON	SIL	RBR	LEC; 11	SPA	ZND	MNZ				NC‡	0‡

^{†} Driver did not finish the race, but was classified as he completed over 90% of the race distance. ^{⹋} No points awarded as less than 50% of race distance was completed. ^{‡} As Latorre was a guest driver, therefore he was ineligible for points.

=== Complete 24 Hours of Le Mans results ===
Year	Team	Co-Drivers	Car	Class	Laps	Pos.	Class Pos.
2021	(Germany) Proton Competition	(Thailand) Vuttikhorn Inthraphuvasak (United Kingdom) Harry Tincknell	Porsche 911 RSR-19	GTE; Am	66	DNF	DNF

=== Complete FIA World Endurance Championship results ===
(key) (Races in bold indicate pole position; races in italics indicate fastest lap)

Year	Entrant	Class	Car	Engine	1	2	3	4	5	6	Rank	Points
2022	TF Sport	LMGTE Am	Aston Martin Vantage AMR	Aston Martin 4.0 L Turbo V8	**SEB**; 2	SPA	LMS	MNZ	FUJ	BHR	15th	28
