= 2014 U.S. F2000 National Championship =

Car racing competition

Seasons
- ← 2013 2015 →

The 2014 U.S. F2000 National Championship was a season of the U.S. F2000 National Championship, an open wheel auto racing series that is the first step in IndyCar's Road to Indy ladder. It was the fifth full season of the series since its revival in 2010. The National Class merged with the Championship class in 2014, resulting in just one class of competition.

Frenchman Florian Latorre, driving for Cape Motorsports with Wayne Taylor Racing, won the championship by winning the final race of the season over Team E's R. C. Enerson. Enerson started the season on a hot streak, winning three of the first four races, before a cold streak ensued. Meanwhile, Latorre had a steadily competitive season, only suffering one DNF in the penultimate race when he could have clinched the championship. Enerson won five races and finished on the podium in nine of the fourteen races. Meanwhile, Latorre only won three times and only scored eight podium finishes, his comparative lack of poor finishes gave him the championship. Latorre's championship gives him a Mazda Road to Indy scholarship to participate in the Pro Mazda Championship in 2015.

Latorre's teammate Jake Eidson finished third in the championship, ten points back from Enerson in a season where he scored two wins. ArmsUp Motorsports' Aaron Telitz scored a single win and finished in fourth place. Afterburner Autosport's Victor Franzoni of Brazil captured the season opener but struggled thereafter, and ultimately fell to fifth in points. The series' first trip to the Indianapolis Motor Speedway road course resulted in two drivers scoring their first and only wins of the season. Will Owen employed an aggressive tire strategy to win the first race on a drying racetrack after a rainstorm and JAY Motorsports' highly touted rookie Adrian Starrantino won the second race in what was otherwise a lackluster season.

Cape Motorsports with Wayne Taylor Racing captured their third straight teams' championship, mainly in part, to the performances of Latorre and Eidson.

== Drivers and teams ==
Team	No.	Drivers	Status	Round(s)
Afterburner Autosport	11	(Brazil) Felipe Donato		1–4
Afterburner Autosport	15	(Brazil) Gustavo Myasava	R	All
Afterburner Autosport	17	(Brazil) Victor Franzoni	R	All
Afterburner Autosport	18	(Netherlands) Jeroen Slaghekke		1–7
ArmsUp Motorsports	5	(United States) Aaron Telitz	R	All
ArmsUp Motorsports	16	(Canada) James Dayson		8–14
ArmsUp Motorsports	24	(United States) Peter Portante		All
Belardi Auto Racing	4	(Canada) Daniel Burkett		All
Belardi Auto Racing	14	(France) Florian Latorre		1–7
Belardi Auto Racing	44	(Netherlands) Jeroen Slaghekke		8–14
Belardi Auto Racing	41	(France) Nico Jamin	R	1–7
Pabst Racing Services	21	(France) Nico Jamin	R	8–14
Pabst Racing Services	23	(United States) Will Owen	R	All
Pabst Racing Services	77	(United States) Austin Cindric		All
Team E	7	(United States) R. C. Enerson		All
Cape Motorsports w/ Wayne Taylor Racing	2	(United States) Jake Eidson		All
Cape Motorsports w/ Wayne Taylor Racing	3	(Germany) Keyvan Andres	R	All
Cape Motorsports w/ Wayne Taylor Racing	10	(France) Florian Latorre		8–14
D2D Motorsports	61	(United States) Andrew List	R	All
GBI Racing	12	(United States) Tim Hollowell	R	5–6
GBI Racing	12	(United States) Kyle O'Gara	R	7
JAY Motorsports	91	(United States) Adrian Starrantino	R	All
JAY Motorsports	96	(Norway) Henrik Furuseth		All
JAY Motorsports	98	(United States) Colton Herta	R	3–14
JDC Motorsports	93	(United States) Garth Rickards	R	8–9
JDC Motorsports	97	(United States) Clark Toppe		All
John Cummiskey Racing	33	(Canada) Nathan Blok	R	5–6, 8–9
M2 Autosport	13	(Colombia) Juan Maldonado	R	All
M2 Autosport	79	(Colombia) Santiago Lozano	R	All

Icon	Status
R	Rookie

=== Team changes ===
- 2010 and 2011 team champions Andretti Autosport announced that they would not field U.S. F2000 entries in 2014.

== Schedule ==
The series schedule, along with the other Road to Indy series, was announced on October 24, 2013. Unlike previous seasons, all races are in support of the IndyCar Series except the race at Lucas Oil Raceway. All road and street course race weekends are double–headers. The series will race at the Indianapolis Motor Speedway, Barber Motorsports Park, and Sonoma Raceway for the first time in its history. 2014 will be the first season since its revival that will not begin at Sebring Raceway.

Icon	Legend
O	Oval/Speedway
R	Road course
S	Street circuit

Rd.	Date	Race name	Track	Location
1	March 29–30	Peninsula Pipeline Grand Prix of St. Petersburg	S Streets of St. Petersburg	St. Petersburg, Florida
2	March 29–30	Peninsula Pipeline Grand Prix of St. Petersburg	S Streets of St. Petersburg	St. Petersburg, Florida
3	April 26	Grand Prix of Barber Motorsports Park	R Barber Motorsports Park	Birmingham, Alabama
4	April 26	Grand Prix of Barber Motorsports Park	R Barber Motorsports Park	Birmingham, Alabama
5	May 9–10	Grand Prix of Indianapolis - USF2000	R Indianapolis Motor Speedway Road Course	Speedway, Indiana
6	May 9–10	Grand Prix of Indianapolis - USF2000	R Indianapolis Motor Speedway Road Course	Speedway, Indiana
7	May 24	USF2000 Night Before the 500	O Lucas Oil Indianapolis	Clermont, Indiana
8	July 20	Allied Building Products Grand Prix of Toronto	S Exhibition Place	Toronto, Ontario
9	July 20	Allied Building Products Grand Prix of Toronto	S Exhibition Place	Toronto, Ontario
10	August 1–3	Allied Building Products Grand Prix of Mid-Ohio	R Mid–Ohio Sports Car Course	Lexington, Ohio
11	August 1–3	Allied Building Products Grand Prix of Mid-Ohio	R Mid–Ohio Sports Car Course	Lexington, Ohio
12	August 1–3	Allied Building Products Grand Prix of Mid-Ohio	R Mid–Ohio Sports Car Course	Lexington, Ohio
13	August 22–23	USF2000 Grand Prix of Sonoma	R Sonoma Raceway	Sonoma, California
14	August 22–23	USF2000 Grand Prix of Sonoma	R Sonoma Raceway	Sonoma, California

== Race results ==
Rd.	Track	Pole position	Fastest lap	Most laps led	Race winner	
Rd.	Track	Pole position	Fastest lap	Most laps led	Driver	Team
1	Streets of St. Petersburg	(Brazil) Victor Franzoni	(Brazil) Victor Franzoni	(Brazil) Victor Franzoni	(Brazil) Victor Franzoni	Afterburner Autosport
2	Streets of St. Petersburg		(United States) R. C. Enerson	(United States) R. C. Enerson	(United States) R. C. Enerson	Team E
3	Barber Motorsports Park	(France) Florian Latorre	(United States) R. C. Enerson	(United States) R. C. Enerson	(United States) R. C. Enerson	Team E
4	Barber Motorsports Park		(United States) Aaron Telitz	(United States) R. C. Enerson	(United States) R. C. Enerson	Team E
5	Indianapolis Motor Speedway Road Course	(France) Florian Latorre	(United States) Adrian Starrantino	(United States) Jake Eidson	(United States) Will Owen	Pabst Racing Services
6	Indianapolis Motor Speedway Road Course		(United States) Colton Herta	(Brazil) Victor Franzoni	(United States) Adrian Starrantino	JAY Motorsports
7	Lucas Oil Raceway at Indianapolis	(France) Florian Latorre	(France) Florian Latorre	(United States) Aaron Telitz	(United States) Aaron Telitz	ArmsUp Motorsports
8	Exhibition Place	(France) Florian Latorre	(France) Florian Latorre	(France) Florian Latorre	(United States) Jake Eidson	Cape Motorsports with WTR
9	Exhibition Place		(Brazil) Victor Franzoni	(United States) R. C. Enerson	(France) Florian Latorre	Cape Motorsports with WTR
10	Mid–Ohio Sports Car Course	(France) Florian Latorre	(France) Florian Latorre	(United States) R. C. Enerson	(United States) R. C. Enerson	Team E
11	Mid–Ohio Sports Car Course		(United States) Jake Eidson	(United States) R. C. Enerson	(United States) Jake Eidson	Cape Motorsports with WTR
12	Mid–Ohio Sports Car Course		(France) Florian Latorre	(France) Florian Latorre	(France) Florian Latorre	Cape Motorsports with WTR
13	Sonoma Raceway	(France) Florian Latorre	(United States) Peter Portante	(United States) R. C. Enerson	(United States) R. C. Enerson	Team E
14	Sonoma Raceway		(France) Florian Latorre	(United States) R. C. Enerson	(France) Florian Latorre	Cape Motorsports with WTR

== Championship standings ==
=== Drivers' Championship ===
Pos	Driver	STP		BAR		IMS		LOR	TOR		MOH			SNM		Points
1	(France) Florian Latorre	7	3	**2**	5	**4**	2	**6**	**2***	1	**2**	4	1*	**21**	1	310
2	(United States) R. C. Enerson	2	1*	1*	1*	7	10	16	3	17*	1*	8*	3	1*	2*	301
3	(United States) Jake Eidson	4	2	3	8	2*	9	9	1	2	4	1	8	3	3	291
4	(United States) Aaron Telitz	16	12	5	2	3	11	1*	6	3	7	2	7	2	4	246
5	(Brazil) Victor Franzoni	**1***	DSQ	13	3	15	3*	3	7	4	8	14	5	6	19	202
6	(United States) Peter Portante	13	15	12	6	6	7	7	4	19	3	15	2	4	17	173
7	(United States) Adrian Starrantino	6	4	7	13	17	1	11	8	21	21	7	21	10	6	157
8	(United States) Clark Toppe	15	5	10	11	13	4	5	11	5	12	17	16	12	7	156
9	(France) Nico Jamin	3	14	6	10	9	19	10	20	6	11	5	9	9	8	154
10	(Norway) Henrik Furuseth	8	13	8	9	21	5	13	18	20	5	3	10	8	5	149
11	(Canada) Daniel Burkett	5	11	4	4	10	12	12	9	8	6	20	4	20	21	147
12	(United States) Will Owen	18	6	11	14	1	8	15	17	22	13	10	12	14	12	133
13	(Netherlands) Jeroen Slaghekke	9	7	DSQ	12	16	15	4	19	9	9	19	11	5	10	130
14	(United States) Austin Cindric	11	10	9	17	8	21	2	15	18	18	6	6	13	20	125
15	(United States) Colton Herta			19	7	5	20	14	5	14	10	16	13	7	9	115
16	(Germany) Keyvan Andres	10	9	14	15	22	6	8	21	13	20	9	14	11	11	114
17	(United States) Andrew List	12	17	18	19	11	18	19	14	10	19	13	18	17	14	72
18	(Brazil) Gustavo Myasava	DNS	16	17	20	19	14	17	10	15	14	11	17	16	15	68
19	(Colombia) Santiago Lozano	14	8	15	16	20	22	20	DNS	DNS	15	21	15	15	13	61
20	(Colombia) Juan Maldonado	17	DNS	16	18	14	17	21	13	11	16	18	20	18	18	57
21	(Canada) Nathan Blok					12	13		12	7						40
22	(Canada) James Dayson								DNS	12	17	12	19	19	16	31
23	(United States) Garth Rickards								16	16						10
24	(United States) Tim Hollowell					18	16									8
25	(United States) Kyle O'Gara							18								3
	(Brazil) Felipe Donato	DNS	DNS	DNS	DNS											0
Pos	Driver	STP		BAR		IMS		LOR	TOR		MOH			SNM		Points

Color	Result
Gold	Winner
Silver	2nd place
Bronze	3rd place
Green	4th & 5th place
Light Blue	6th–10th place
Dark Blue	Finished (Outside Top 10)
Purple	Did not finish
Red	Did not qualify (DNQ)
Brown	Withdrawn (Wth)
Black	Disqualified (DSQ)
White	Did not start (DNS)
Blank	Did not participate

**In–line notation**
**Bold**	Pole position (1 point)
Italics	Ran fastest race lap (1 point)
*	Led most race laps (1 point); Not awarded if more than one driver leads most laps
Rookie

=== Teams' Championship ===
Pos	Team	Points
1	Cape Motorsports w/ Wayne Taylor Racing	372
2	ArmsUp Motorsports	242
3	Team E Racing	232
4	JAY Motorsports	168
5	Belardi Auto Racing	141
6	Afterburner Autosport	135
7	Pabst Racing	115
8	JDC Motorsports	95
9	D2D Motorsports	56
10	M2 Autosport	37
11	John Cummiskey Racing	21
12	GBI Racing	12
