= Jeroen Slaghekke =

Dutch racing driver (born 1992)

- Nationality: (Netherlands) Dutch
- Born: 3 May 1992 (age 34) The Hague, Netherlands

U.S. F2000 National Championship career
- Debut season: 2013
- Current team: Belardi Auto Racing
- Car number: 4
- Former teams: Cape Motorsports w/ Wayne Taylor Racing; Afterburner Autosport
- Best finish: 13th in 2014

Previous series
- 2012 2009-2011: Formula Renault 2.0 Northern European Cup; British Formula Ford

Jeroen Slaghekke (born 3 May 1992 at The Hague, Netherlands) is a Dutch racing driver. He finished third in the Suzuki Swift Cup Netherlands in 2009 and was the 2011 vice-champion in the British Formula Ford Championship.

== Racing career ==
=== Netherlands ===
Slaghekke started his motorsport career in go-karts in 2007, Racing in the Dutch RK-1 4 stroke karting championship. He then moved up to touring cars in 2008, where he raced in the Suzuki Swift Cup Netherlands for the Coronel Junior Team run by Tom Coronel.

2009 saw Slaghekke race a second year in Suzuki Swift Cup Netherlands with the Coronel Junior Team, in which he finished third overall with 170 points.

=== International ===
Slaghekke joined the Jamun Racing Services team to compete in the 2010 British Formula Ford season in Great Britain. He enjoyed a maiden success in the series with a podium finish at Donington Park.

For 2011, Slaghekke returned to the UK to compete in the British Formula Ford Championship for a second year. Racing a Mygale for British team Jamun Racing Services, he won four races, took 21 podiums, eight pole positions and seven fastest racing laps. He also holds the Formula Ford lap record for the Silverstone National Circuit, standing at 58.200 seconds, and the Silverstone Circuit standing at 2.08.182.

In 2012, Slaghekke raced in Formula Renault 2.0 Northern European Cup for Van Amersfoort Racing and finished fourth in points with a runner-up finish in his home race at Circuit Park Zandvoort and a win at Autodrom Most.

In 2013, Slaghekke signed on with Cape Motorsports to race in the American U.S. F2000 National Championship. Slaghekke left the team after three rounds of the championship and joined Afterburner Autosport. He made appearances in two more rounds (5 starts) before leaving the series for the rest of the season. He finished 22nd in points with a best finish of eighth. In 2014, Slaghekke returned to the series with Afterburner. He switched teams after four rounds (seven races) to Belardi Auto Racing where he completed the season. He improved to 13th in points with a best finish of fourth on the oval at Lucas Oil Raceway at Indianapolis, his final start with Afterburner.

== Racing record ==
=== Complete Formula Renault 2.0 NEC results ===
(key) (Races in bold indicate pole position) (Races in italics indicate fastest lap)

Year	Entrant	1	2	3	4	5	6	7	8	9	10	11	12	13	14	15	16	17	18	19	20	DC	Points
2012	Van Amersfoort Racing	HOC; 1; 6	HOC; 2; 11	**HOC**; **3**; 7	NÜR; 1; 14	NÜR; 2; 13	**OSC**; **1**; 5	OSC; 2; 6	OSC; 3; 4	ASS; 1; 7	ASS; 2; 10	RBR; 1; 10	RBR; 2; 12	MST; 1; 16	MST; 2; 1	MST; 3; 11	**ZAN**; **1**; 2	ZAN; 2 Ret	ZAN; 3; 4	SPA; 1; 13	SPA; 2; 21	4th	241

=== American open–wheel racing results ===
(key) (Races in bold indicate pole position) (Races in italics indicate fastest lap)

==== U.S. F2000 National Championship ====
Year	Team	1	2	3	4	5	6	7	8	9	10	11	12	13	14	Rank	Points
2013	Cape Motorsports Wayne Taylor Racing	SEB; 9	SEB; 12	STP; 20	STP; 24	LOR; 14										**22nd**	**51**
2013	Afterburner Autosport						TOR; 26	TOR; 28	MOH; 16	MOH; 8	MOH; 19	MLS	MLS	HOU	HOU	**22nd**	**51**
2014	Afterburner Autosport	STP; 9	STP; 7	BAR; DSQ	BAR; 12	IMS; 16	IMS; 15	LOR; 4								**13th**	**130**
2014	Belardi Auto Racing								TOR; 19	TOR; 9	MOH; 9	MOH; 19	MOH; 11	SNM; 5	SNM; 10	**13th**	**130**
