= 2019 Formula 2 Championship =

Racing Championship

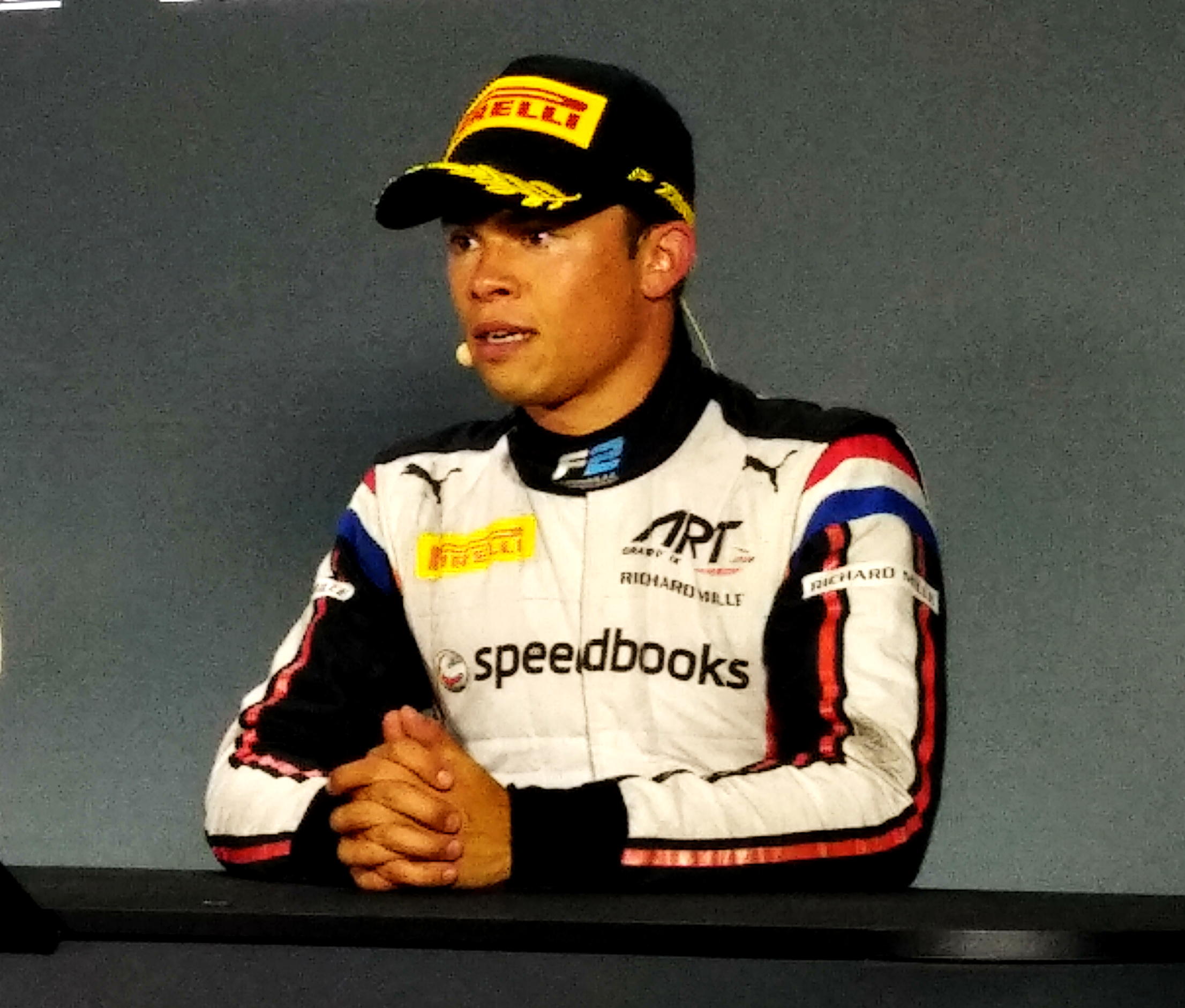
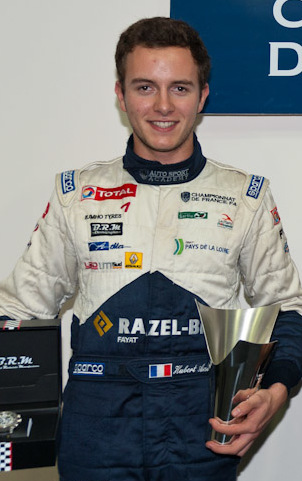
Nyck de Vries, won the championship, driving for ART Grand Prix. The season, however, was overshadowed by the fatal accident suffered by Anthoine Hubert (pictured in 2013, right) at Spa.

The 2019 FIA Formula 2 Championship was the fifty-third season of the second-tier of Formula One feeder championship and also third season under the moniker of FIA Formula 2 Championship, a motor racing championship for Formula 2 cars that is sanctioned by the Fédération Internationale de l'Automobile (FIA). It is an open-wheel racing category that serves as the second tier of formula racing in the FIA Global Pathway. The category was run in support of the 2019 FIA Formula 1 World Championship.

George Russell was the reigning drivers' champion, having won the title at the final round of the 2018 championship in Abu Dhabi. Russell would drive in Formula One for Williams in 2019. (Note: Under the series' sporting regulations, the defending drivers' champion is not permitted to continue racing in the championship, so Russell would not be able to defend his title.) Carlin were the reigning teams' champions, having secured their first Formula 2 title in Abu Dhabi. ART Grand Prix driver Nyck de Vries won the drivers' championship after the win in the Feature race at Sochi. In the teams' championship DAMS secured their first team title over UNI-Virtuosi Racing after the win in the Feature race at Abu Dhabi.

The season was marred by the death of French driver Anthoine Hubert during the feature race of the Spa-Francorchamps round on 31 August 2019. Hubert's death was the first fatality for a driver competing in FIA-sanctioned feeder series racing since Henry Surtees's fatal crash at Brands Hatch in 2009 in the FIA Formula Two Championship.

The Formula One theme song composed by Brian Tyler, which debuted in the 2018 F1 season, would now be used in Formula 2 broadcasts.

The season would see 8 different winners, with the top three in the championship, De Vries, Nicholas Latifi, and Luca Ghiotto, each winning 4 races. 3 races were won by Jack Aitken, and 2 races were won by Hubert, Sérgio Sette Câmara, and Nobuharu Matsushita. The only other race winner was rookie Mick Schumacher.

== Entries ==
The following teams and drivers competed in the 2019 championship. As the championship is a spec series, all competitors raced with an identical Dallara F2 2018 chassis with a V6 turbo engine developed by Mecachrome. Teams competed with tyres supplied by Pirelli.

Entrant	No.	Driver name	Rounds
(United Kingdom) Carlin	1	(Switzerland) Louis Delétraz	All
(United Kingdom) Carlin	2	(Japan) Nobuharu Matsushita	All
(France) ART Grand Prix	3	(Russia) Nikita Mazepin	All
(France) ART Grand Prix	4	(Netherlands) Nyck de Vries	All
(France) DAMS	5	(Brazil) Sérgio Sette Câmara	All
(France) DAMS	6	(Canada) Nicholas Latifi	All
(United Kingdom) UNI-Virtuosi Racing	7	(China) Guanyu Zhou	All
(United Kingdom) UNI-Virtuosi Racing	8	(Italy) Luca Ghiotto	All
(Italy) Prema Racing	9	(Germany) Mick Schumacher	All
(Italy) Prema Racing	10	(Indonesia) Sean Gelael	All
(Czech Republic) Sauber Junior Team by Charouz	11	(United Kingdom) Callum Ilott	All
(Czech Republic) Sauber Junior Team by Charouz	12	(United States) Juan Manuel Correa	1–9
(Czech Republic) Sauber Junior Team by Charouz	12	(Russia) Matevos Isaakyan	11–12
(Spain) Campos Racing	14	(France) Dorian Boccolacci	1–5
(Spain) Campos Racing	14	(India) Arjun Maini	6–8
(Spain) Campos Racing	14	(Japan) Marino Sato	9–12
(Spain) Campos Racing	15	(United Kingdom) Jack Aitken	All
(Netherlands) MP Motorsport	16	(United Kingdom) Jordan King	1–3, 5–12
(Netherlands) MP Motorsport	16	(Russia) Artem Markelov	4
(Netherlands) MP Motorsport	17	(Netherlands) Mahaveer Raghunathan (Note: Mahaveer Raghunathan is an Indian driver competing under a Dutch license.)	1–5, 7–12
(Netherlands) MP Motorsport	17	(United States) Pato O'Ward (Note: Pato O'Ward is a Mexican driver competing under an American license.)	6
(United Kingdom) BWT Arden	18	(Colombia) Tatiana Calderón	All
(United Kingdom) BWT Arden	19	(France) Anthoine Hubert	1–9
(United Kingdom) BWT Arden	22	(Russia) Artem Markelov (Note: Artem Markelov raced with #22 when the team retired #19.)	11–12
(Italy) Trident	20	(France) Giuliano Alesi (Note: At Monza, Alesi drove the car which had previously been driven by Ralph Boschung after Alesi's car was impounded by Belgian authorities as part of their investigation into the accident at Spa-Francorchamps which resulted in the death of Anthoine Hubert. Despite this, Alesi ran with his usual number of 20.)	All
(Italy) Trident	21	(Switzerland) Ralph Boschung	1–5, 8–9, 11
(Italy) Trident	21	(United States) Ryan Tveter	6
(Italy) Trident	21	(France) Dorian Boccolacci	7
(Italy) Trident	21	(Denmark) Christian Lundgaard	12

=== Team changes ===
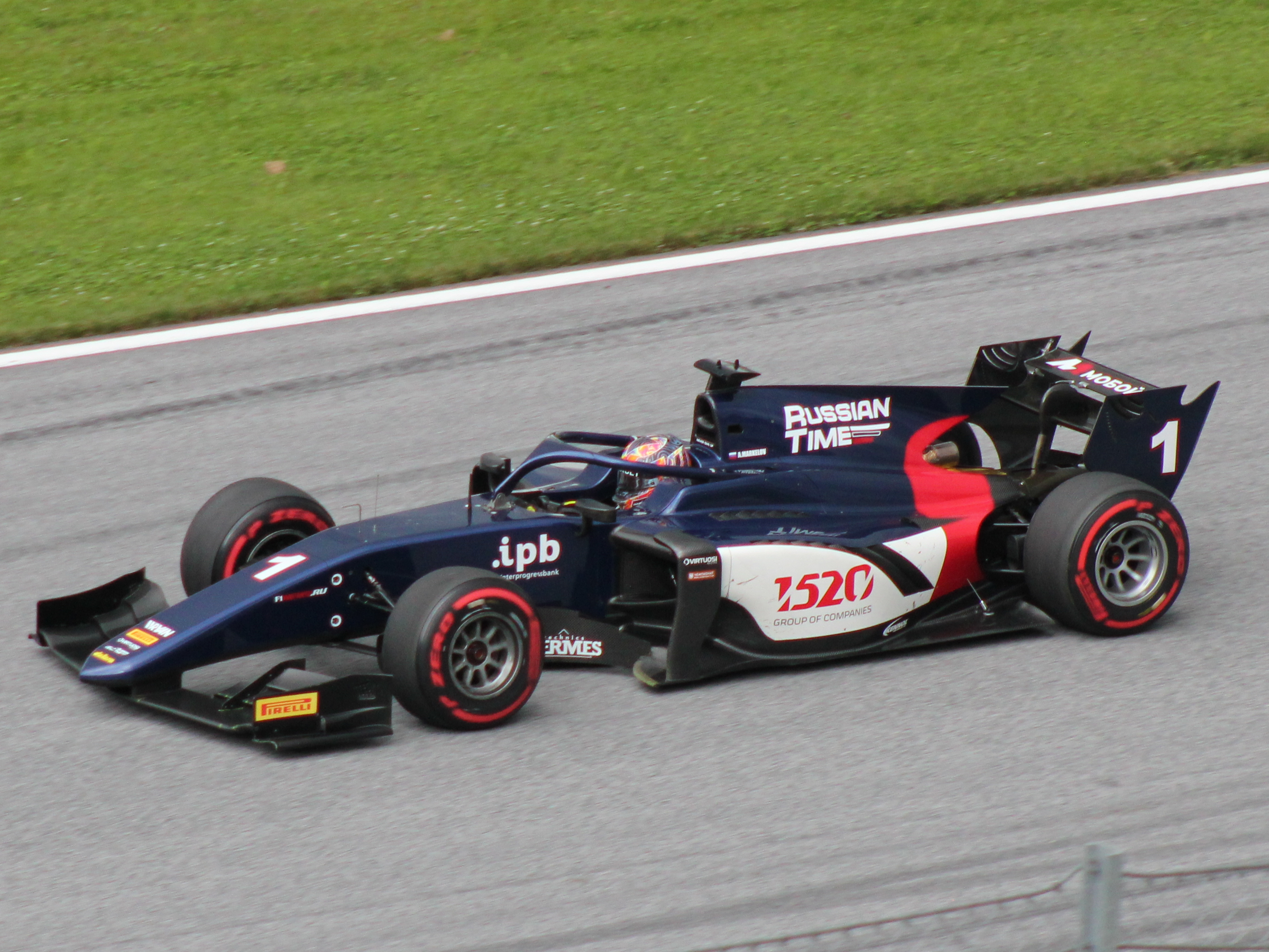
Russian Time withdrew from the championship at the end of the 2018 season.

Russian Time left the championship after six years competing in Formula 2 and its predecessor, the GP2 Series. Their entry and assets were sold to Virtuosi Racing, who had operated the team. The new entry competes under the name "UNI-Virtuosi Racing". Fortec Motorsports had been granted an entry to the Formula 2 grid in 2018, but were later given permission to defer their entry until 2019. However, they were subsequently omitted from the draft entry list for the 2019 championship.

Arden International entered into a partnership with Mercedes-affiliated team HWA Racelab. Charouz Racing System formed a partnership with Sauber Motorsport, which ran Alfa Romeo's team in Formula 1. The Sauber-Charouz partnership is not affiliated with Alfa Romeo's Formula 1 entry.

=== Driver changes ===
Lando Norris left Carlin and the series as he was promoted to Formula 1 with McLaren. His seat was taken by Louis Delétraz, who left Charouz Racing System to join the team. He was joined by Nobuharu Matsushita, who returned to Formula 2 after a year spent racing in the Super Formula Championship, to replace Sérgio Sette Câmara.

Sette Câmara left Carlin to replace Alexander Albon at DAMS. Albon left the championship to join Formula 1 team Toro Rosso.

Arden drivers Nirei Fukuzumi and Maximilian Günther left the series. Fukuzumi moved to the Super Formula Championship with Dandelion Racing, while Günther joined the Formula E championship with Dragon Racing. Reigning GP3 Series champion Anthoine Hubert and GP3 Series regular Tatiana Calderón joined Arden in their place.

Artem Markelov and Tadasuke Makino left Russian Time and the championship. Both drivers moved to Japan to compete in the Super Formula Championship; Markelov joined Team LeMans while Makino joined Nakajima Racing. Guanyu Zhou graduated from the 2018 FIA Formula 3 European Championship, joining Russian Time's successors UNI-Virtuosi. Zhou was partnered by Luca Ghiotto, who raced with Russian Time in 2017 and Campos Racing in 2018.

Nikita Mazepin joined the championship with ART Grand Prix, the team he drove for when he finished runner-up in the 2018 GP3 Series. Mazepin was partnered with Nyck de Vries, who left Prema Racing to join the team. Mazepin and de Vries replaced 2018 series champion George Russell—who left the team and the championship to join Formula 1 team Williams—and Jack Aitken, who switched to Campos Racing. Prema Theodore Racing named Mick Schumacher as de Vries' replacement. Schumacher continued his association with the team after he won the 2018 FIA Formula 3 European Championship with them.

Arjun Maini left Trident and the series to join RLR MSport in the European Le Mans Series. Giuliano Alesi joined the championship with Trident, the team he raced for in the GP3 Series. He was joined by Ralph Boschung, who left MP Motorsport before the Sochi round in 2018. Dorian Boccolacci also left MP Motorsport, joining Jack Aitken at Campos Racing. Jordan King returned to the series with MP Motorsport, contesting the championship alongside his part-time NTT IndyCar Series campaign. Mahaveer Raghunathan returned to full-time competition for the first time since 2016, partnering King at MP Motorsport. Callum Ilott and Juan Manuel Correa joined the series, both signing with Sauber Junior Team by Charouz. Antonio Fuoco left Charouz and the series to join Formula One team Ferrari as a test driver.

Mid-season changes

Artem Markelov made a one-off return in Monaco as a replacement for Jordan King at MP Motorsport, who was competing in the 2019 Indianapolis 500 with Rahal Letterman Lanigan Racing. After collecting twelve penalty points on his racing license for incurring three Virtual Safety Car infringements during the Paul Ricard feature race, Mahaveer Raghunathan was banned from the series for the Red Bull Ring round. Raghunathan's MP seat was filled in Austria by 2018 Indy Lights champion and 2019 IndyCar Series driver Patricio O'Ward.

Shortly after the Paul Ricard round, Arjun Maini was announced to be replacing Dorian Boccolacci at Campos Racing for the Red Bull Ring and Silverstone rounds. Marino Sato replaced Maini prior to the Spa round.

After encountering funding problems, Ralph Boschung left Trident prior to the Red Bull Ring round. Former GP3 driver Ryan Tveter joined the team in Boschung's place. Tveter was later replaced by Boccolacci. Boschung returned to the team ahead of the Hungarian round.

BWT Arden was represented only by Tatiana Calderón at Monza after Anthoine Hubert's fatal accident. Juan Manuel Correa, who was also involved in the incident, was forced to miss the rest of the season due to injuries. Sauber Junior Team by Charouz did not replace him at Monza, running only Callum Ilott. Giuliano Alesi's car was impounded by Belgian authorities as part of their investigation into the accident at Spa, limiting Trident to a single entry for the next round. Ralph Boschung was stood down to allow Alesi to compete.

For the Sochi and Yas Marina rounds, Matevos Isaakyan, who raced in the 2018 European Le Mans Series, took Juan Manuel Correa's seat at Sauber Junior Team by Charouz. Artem Markelov replaced Anthoine Hubert at BWT Arden for the same rounds, although the Russian raced with #22 as the #19 had been retired for the remainder of the season in honour of the late French driver.

== Calendar ==
The following twelve rounds were scheduled to take place as part of the 2019 championship. Round 9 was abandoned. Each round consisted of two races: a Feature race, which was run over 170 km (105.6 mi) and included a mandatory pit stop; and a Sprint race, which was run over 120 km (75 mi) and did not require drivers to make a pit stop. (Note: The Feature and Sprint races are time-certain. In the event that the full race distance cannot be completed, the Feature race will end after one hour and the Sprint race after forty-five minutes.) The 2019 calendar retained the same twelve rounds from the 2018 season.

Round	Circuit	Feature race	Sprint race
1	Bahrain International Circuit, Sakhir	30 March	31 March
2	(Azerbaijan) Baku City Circuit, Baku	27 April	28 April
3	(Spain) Circuit de Barcelona-Catalunya, Montmeló	11 May	12 May
4	Circuit de Monaco, Monte Carlo	25 May	26 May
5	(France) Circuit Paul Ricard, Le Castellet	22 June	23 June
6	(Austria) Red Bull Ring, Spielberg	29 June	30 June
7	(United Kingdom) Silverstone Circuit, Silverstone	13 July	14 July
8	(Hungary) Hungaroring, Mogyoród	3 August	4 August
9	(Belgium) Circuit de Spa-Francorchamps, Stavelot	31 August	1 September
10	(Italy) Autodromo Nazionale di Monza, Monza	7 September	8 September
11	(Russia) Sochi Autodrom, Sochi	28 September	29 September
12	(United Arab Emirates) Yas Marina Circuit, Abu Dhabi	30 November	1 December

== Results ==
=== Season summary ===
Round		Circuit	Pole position	Fastest lap	Winning driver	Winning team	Report
1	F	Bahrain International Circuit	(Italy) Luca Ghiotto	(China) Guanyu Zhou	(Canada) Nicholas Latifi	(France) DAMS	Report
1	S	Bahrain International Circuit		(Netherlands) Nyck de Vries	(Italy) Luca Ghiotto	(United Kingdom) UNI-Virtuosi Racing	Report
2	F	(Azerbaijan) Baku City Circuit	(Japan) Nobuharu Matsushita	(Japan) Nobuharu Matsushita (Note: Nobuharu Matsushita set the fastest lap, but did not finish in the top 10, so was ineligible to be the point-scorer for the fastest lap. Jack Aitken was the point-scorer instead for setting the fastest lap of those finishing in the top 10.)	(United Kingdom) Jack Aitken	(Spain) Campos Racing	Report
2	S	(Azerbaijan) Baku City Circuit		(Italy) Luca Ghiotto (Note: Luca Ghiotto set the fastest lap, but did not finish in the top 10, so was ineligible to be the point-scorer for the fastest lap. Sérgio Sette Câmara was the point-scorer instead for setting the fastest lap of those finishing in the top 10.)	(Canada) Nicholas Latifi	(France) DAMS	Report
3	F	(Spain) Circuit de Barcelona-Catalunya	(Italy) Luca Ghiotto	(United Kingdom) Jordan King	(Canada) Nicholas Latifi	(France) DAMS	Report
3	S	(Spain) Circuit de Barcelona-Catalunya		(Canada) Nicholas Latifi	(Netherlands) Nyck de Vries	(France) ART Grand Prix	Report
4	F	Circuit de Monaco	(Netherlands) Nyck de Vries	(Japan) Nobuharu Matsushita	(Netherlands) Nyck de Vries	(France) ART Grand Prix	Report
4	S	Circuit de Monaco		(Indonesia) Sean Gelael (Note: Sean Gelael set the fastest lap, but did not finish in the top 10, so was ineligible to be the point-scorer for the fastest lap. Nicholas Latifi was the point-scorer instead for setting the fastest lap of those finishing in the top 10.)	(France) Anthoine Hubert	(United Kingdom) BWT Arden	Report
5	F	(France) Circuit Paul Ricard	(Brazil) Sérgio Sette Câmara	(Netherlands) Nyck de Vries	(Netherlands) Nyck de Vries	(France) ART Grand Prix	Report
5	S	(France) Circuit Paul Ricard		(Japan) Nobuharu Matsushita	(France) Anthoine Hubert	(United Kingdom) BWT Arden	Report
6	F	(Austria) Red Bull Ring	(Netherlands) Nyck de Vries	(Brazil) Sérgio Sette Câmara	(Japan) Nobuharu Matsushita	(United Kingdom) Carlin	Report
6	S	(Austria) Red Bull Ring		(Netherlands) Nyck de Vries (Note: Nyck de Vries and Sérgio Sette Câmara recorded identical lap times (1:18.159), but de Vries set it earlier, so he was recognised as the fastest lap holder.)	(Brazil) Sérgio Sette Câmara	(France) DAMS	Report
7	F	(United Kingdom) Silverstone Circuit	(China) Guanyu Zhou	(Brazil) Sérgio Sette Câmara	(Italy) Luca Ghiotto	(United Kingdom) UNI-Virtuosi Racing	Report
7	S	(United Kingdom) Silverstone Circuit		(United Kingdom) Jack Aitken	(United Kingdom) Jack Aitken	(Spain) Campos Racing	Report
8	F	(Hungary) Hungaroring	(Netherlands) Nyck de Vries	(United Kingdom) Jordan King	(Canada) Nicholas Latifi	(France) DAMS	Report
8	S	(Hungary) Hungaroring		(Japan) Nobuharu Matsushita	(Germany) Mick Schumacher	(Italy) Prema Racing	Report
9	F	(Belgium) Circuit de Spa-Francorchamps	(Netherlands) Nyck de Vries	Race abandoned (Note: The race session was stopped on lap 2 and was not resumed, after a heavy accident involving Anthoine Hubert, Juan Manuel Correa, Giuliano Alesi and Marino Sato. With less than two laps completed, regulations dictated that no points would be awarded. No race results were published, and the race was declared abandoned.)			Report
9	S	(Belgium) Circuit de Spa-Francorchamps		Race cancelled (Note: The sprint race was cancelled following the death of Anthoine Hubert the previous day in the feature race.)			Report
10	F	(Italy) Autodromo Nazionale di Monza	(United Kingdom) Callum Ilott	(Germany) Mick Schumacher (Note: Mick Schumacher set the fastest lap, but did not finish in the top 10, so was ineligible to be the point-scorer for the fastest lap. Luca Ghiotto was the point-scorer instead for setting the fastest lap of those finishing in the top 10.)	(Japan) Nobuharu Matsushita	(United Kingdom) Carlin	Report
10	S	(Italy) Autodromo Nazionale di Monza		(Germany) Mick Schumacher	(United Kingdom) Jack Aitken	(Spain) Campos Racing	Report
11	F	(Russia) Sochi Autodrom	(Netherlands) Nyck de Vries	(Italy) Luca Ghiotto	(Netherlands) Nyck de Vries	(France) ART Grand Prix	Report
11	S	(Russia) Sochi Autodrom		(Canada) Nicholas Latifi	(Italy) Luca Ghiotto	(United Kingdom) UNI-Virtuosi Racing	Report
12	F	(United Arab Emirates) Yas Marina Circuit	(Brazil) Sérgio Sette Câmara	(China) Guanyu Zhou	(Brazil) Sérgio Sette Câmara	(France) DAMS	Report
12	S	(United Arab Emirates) Yas Marina Circuit		(Canada) Nicholas Latifi	(Italy) Luca Ghiotto	(United Kingdom) UNI-Virtuosi Racing	Report

== Championship standings ==
=== Scoring system ===
Points were awarded to the top 10 classified finishers in the Feature race, and to the top 8 classified finishers in the Sprint race. The pole-sitter in the feature race also received four points, and two points were given to the driver who set the fastest lap inside the top ten in both the feature and sprint races. No extra points were awarded to the pole-sitter in the sprint race as the grid for the sprint race were based on the results of the feature race with the top eight drivers having their positions reversed.

Feature race points

Position	**1st**	**2nd**	**3rd**	**4th**	**5th**	**6th**	**7th**	**8th**	**9th**	**10th**	**Pole**	**FL**
Points	25	18	15	12	10	8	6	4	2	1	4	2

Sprint race points

Points were awarded to the top eight classified finishers, excluding the fastest lap points which are given to the top ten classified finishers.

Position	**1st**	**2nd**	**3rd**	**4th**	**5th**	**6th**	**7th**	**8th**	**FL**
Points	15	12	10	8	6	4	2	1	2

=== Drivers' championship ===
Pos.	Driver	BHR (Bahrain)		BAK (Azerbaijan)		CAT (Spain)		MCO (Monaco)		LEC (France)		RBR (Austria)		SIL (United Kingdom)		HUN (Hungary)		SPA (Belgium)		MNZ (Italy)		SOC (Russia)		YMC (United Arab Emirates)		Points
Pos.	Driver	FR	SR	FR	SR	FR	SR	FR	SR	FR	SR	FR	SR	FR	SR	FR	SR	FR	SR	FR	SR	FR	SR	FR	SR	Points
1	(Netherlands) Nyck de Vries	6	7^{F}	2	4	5	1	1^{P}	7	1^{F}	10	3^{P}	3^{F}	6	3	2^{P}	6	C^{P}	C	3	3	1^{P}	2	13	13	266
2	(Canada) Nicholas Latifi	1	3	4	1	1	6^{F}	12	10^{F}	5	6	9	6	2	5	1	7	C	C	13	10	2	4^{F}	7	2^{F}	214
3	(Italy) Luca Ghiotto	2^{P}	1	9	Ret	4^{P}	2	DSQ	Ret	Ret	12	2	2	1	15	4	8	C	C	2^{F}	15	4^{F}	1	6	1	207
4	(Brazil) Sérgio Sette Câmara	3	2	Ret	6^{F}	NC	17	3	6	2^{P}	5	5^{F}	1	4^{F}	17	5	3	C	C	5	Ret	5	6	1^{P}	3	204
5	(United Kingdom) Jack Aitken	7	11	1^{F}	3	2	8	17†	13	3	4	10	18	5	1^{F}	3	5	C	C	8	1	7	11	11	10	159
6	(Japan) Nobuharu Matsushita	9	12	13^{P}	12	11	Ret	2^{F}	9	9	9^{F}	1	5	9	7	7	2^{F}	C	C	1	5	6	Ret	2	7	144
7	(China) Guanyu Zhou	10^{F}	4	Ret	10	3	4	5	3	4	3	6	8	3^{P}	8	9	9	C	C	Ret	4	10	5	3^{F}	8	140
8	(Switzerland) Louis Delétraz	5	5	Ret	Ret	12	11	7	2	NC	7	7	Ret	7	2	Ret	13	C	C	Ret	8	3	14	4	6	92
9	(United Kingdom) Jordan King	17	8	3	Ret	7^{F}	7			6	11	8	7	10	9	6^{F}	4	C	C	6	2	12	9	12	9	79
10	(France) Anthoine Hubert	4	9	10	11	6	5	8	1	8	1	4	17	18	11	11	11	C	C							77
11	(United Kingdom) Callum Ilott	14	16	Ret	9	8	3	DNS	14	Ret	8	14	9	8	4	10	10	C	C	4^{P}	12	9	3	5	4	74
12	(Germany) Mick Schumacher	8	6	Ret	5	15	12	13	11	Ret	Ret	18	4	11	6	8	1	C	C	NC	6^{F}	Ret	Ret	9	11	53
13	(United States) Juan Manuel Correa	16	18	7	2	Ret	15	16†	12	7	2	11	10	12	10	14	14	C	C							36
14	(France) Dorian Boccolacci	15	17	5	7	14	18	4	5	Ret	13			Ret	14											30
15	(France) Giuliano Alesi	12	DSQ	Ret	Ret	Ret	16	11	Ret	10	14	13	Ret	17	Ret	13	12	C	C	7	7	13	8	8	5	20
16	(Russia) Artem Markelov							6	4													Ret	10	Ret	Ret	16
17	(Indonesia) Sean Gelael	Ret	10	6	8	9	9	Ret	15	Ret	17	16	12	WD	WD	15	17	C	C	9	Ret	11	7	17	Ret	15
18	(Russia) Nikita Mazepin	19	13	8	Ret	17	14	10	8	Ret	16	12	11	16†	12	12	15	C	C	11	9	8	Ret	10	17†	11
19	(Switzerland) Ralph Boschung	11	14	12	Ret	10	10	9	Ret	Ret	15					18†	18	C	C			14	12			3
20	(Netherlands) Mahaveer Raghunathan	18	19	11	13	16	19	15	Ret	12	18			15	18	17	19	C	C	10	13	17	17	Ret	15	1
21	(Japan) Marino Sato																	C	C	12	11	16	15	18	16	0
22	(Colombia) Tatiana Calderón	13	15	Ret	Ret	13	13	14	Ret	11	19†	17	13	14	16	16	Ret	C	C	Ret	14	15	16	16	14	0
23	(Denmark) Christian Lundgaard																							14	12	0
24	(India) Arjun Maini											DSQ	15	13	13	Ret	16									0
25	(Russia) Matevos Isaakyan																					18	13	15	Ret	0
26	(United States) Pato O'Ward											19	14													0
27	(United States) Ryan Tveter											15	16													0
Pos.	Driver	FR	SR	FR	SR	FR	SR	FR	SR	FR	SR	FR	SR	FR	SR	FR	SR	FR	SR	FR	SR	FR	SR	FR	SR	Points
Pos.	Driver	BHR (Bahrain)		BAK (Azerbaijan)		CAT (Spain)		MCO (Monaco)		LEC (France)		RBR (Austria)		SIL (United Kingdom)		HUN (Hungary)		SPA (Belgium)		MNZ (Italy)		SOC (Russia)		YMC (United Arab Emirates)		Points

Key
Colour	Result
Gold	Winner
Silver	Second place
Bronze	Third place
Green	Other points position
Blue	Other classified position
Blue	Not classified, finished (NC)
Purple	Not classified, retired (Ret)
Red	Did not qualify (DNQ)
Black	Disqualified (DSQ)
White	Did not start (DNS)
White	Race cancelled (C)
Blank	Did not practice (DNP)
Blank	Excluded (EX)
Blank	Did not arrive (DNA)
Blank	Withdrawn (WD)
Blank	Did not enter (empty cell)
Annotation	Meaning
P	Pole position
F	Fastest lap

Notes:

- † – Drivers did not finish the race, but were classified as they completed more than 90% of the race distance.

=== Teams' championship ===
Pos.	Team	No.	BHR (Bahrain)		BAK (Azerbaijan)		CAT (Spain)		MCO (Monaco)		LEC (France)		RBR (Austria)		SIL (United Kingdom)		HUN (Hungary)		SPA (Belgium)		MNZ (Italy)		SOC (Russia)		YMC (United Arab Emirates)		Points
Pos.	Team	No.	FR	SR	FR	SR	FR	SR	FR	SR	FR	SR	FR	SR	FR	SR	FR	SR	FR	SR	FR	SR	FR	SR	FR	SR	Points
1	(France) DAMS	5	3	2	Ret	6	NC	17	3	6	**2**	5	5	1	4	17	5	3	C	C	5	Ret	5	6	**1**	3	418
1	(France) DAMS	6	1	3	4	1	1	6	12	10	5	6	9	6	2	5	1	7	C	C	13	10	2	4	7	2	418
2	(United Kingdom) UNI-Virtuosi Racing	7	10	4	Ret	10	3	4	5	3	4	3	6	8	**3**	8	9	9	C	C	Ret	4	10	5	3	8	347
2	(United Kingdom) UNI-Virtuosi Racing	8	**2**	1	9	Ret	**4**	2	DSQ	Ret	Ret	12	2	2	1	15	4	8	C	C	2	15	4	1	6	1	347
3	(France) ART Grand Prix	3	19	13	8	Ret	17	14	10	8	Ret	16	12	11	16†	12	12	15	C	C	11	9	8	Ret	10	17†	277
3	(France) ART Grand Prix	4	6	7	2	4	5	1	**1**	7	1	10	**3**	3	6	3	**2**	6	**C**	C	3	3	**1**	2	13	13	277
4	(United Kingdom) Carlin	1	5	5	Ret	Ret	12	11	7	2	NC	7	7	Ret	7	2	Ret	13	C	C	Ret	8	3	14	2	7	236
4	(United Kingdom) Carlin	2	9	12	**13**	12	11	Ret	2	9	9	9	1	5	9	7	7	2	C	C	1	5	6	Ret	4	6	236
5	(Spain) Campos Racing	14	15	17	5	7	14	18	4	5	Ret	13	DSQ	15	13	13	Ret	16	C	C	12	11	16	15	18	16	189
5	(Spain) Campos Racing	15	7	11	1	3	2	8	17†	13	3	4	10	18	5	1	3	5	C	C	8	1	7	11	11	10	189
6	(Czech Republic) Sauber Junior Team by Charouz	11	14	16	Ret	9	8	3	DNS	14	Ret	8	14	9	8	4	10	10	C	C	**4**	12	9	3	5	4	110
6	(Czech Republic) Sauber Junior Team by Charouz	12	16	18	7	2	Ret	15	16†	12	7	2	11	10	12	10	14	14	C	C			18	13	15	Ret	110
7	(Netherlands) MP Motorsport	16	17	8	3	Ret	7	7	6	4	6	11	8	7	10	9	6	4	C	C	6	2	12	9	12	9	96
7	(Netherlands) MP Motorsport	17	18	19	11	13	16	19	15	Ret	12	18	19	14	15	18	17	19	C	C	10	13	17	17	Ret	15	96
8	(United Kingdom) BWT Arden	18	13	15	Ret	Ret	13	13	14	Ret	11	19†	17	13	14	16	16	Ret	C	C	Ret	14	15	16	16	14	77
8	(United Kingdom) BWT Arden	19	4	9	10	11	6	5	8	1	8	1	4	17	18	11	11	11	C	C							77
8	(United Kingdom) BWT Arden	22																					Ret	10	Ret	Ret	77
9	(Italy) Prema Racing	9	8	6	Ret	5	15	12	13	11	Ret	Ret	18	4	11	6	8	1	C	C	NC	6	Ret	Ret	9	11	68
9	(Italy) Prema Racing	10	Ret	10	6	8	9	9	Ret	15	Ret	17	16	12	WD	WD	15	17	C	C	9	Ret	11	7	17	Ret	68
10	(Italy) Trident	20	12	DSQ	Ret	Ret	Ret	16	11	Ret	10	14	13	Ret	17	Ret	13	12	C	C	7	7	13	8	8	5	23
10	(Italy) Trident	21	11	14	12	Ret	10	10	9	Ret	Ret	15	15	16	Ret	14	18†	18	C	C			14	12	14	12	23
Pos.	Team	No.	FR	SR	FR	SR	FR	SR	FR	SR	FR	SR	FR	SR	FR	SR	FR	SR	FR	SR	FR	SR	FR	SR	FR	SR	Points
Pos.	Team	No.	BHR (Bahrain)		BAK (Azerbaijan)		CAT (Spain)		MCO (Monaco)		LEC (France)		RBR (Austria)		SIL (United Kingdom)		HUN (Hungary)		SPA (Belgium)		MNZ (Italy)		SOC (Russia)		YMC (United Arab Emirates)		Points

Key
Colour	Result
Gold	Winner
Silver	2nd place
Bronze	3rd place
Green	Other points position
Blue	Other classified position
Blue	Not classified, finished (NC)
Purple	Not classified, retired (Ret)
Red	Did not qualify (DNQ)
Red	Did not pre-qualify (DNPQ)
Black	Disqualified (DSQ)
White	Did not start (DNS)
White	Race cancelled (C)
Blank	Did not practice (DNP)
Blank	Excluded (EX)
Blank	Did not arrive (DNA)
Blank	Withdrawn (WD)
Text formatting	Meaning
**Bold**	Pole position point(s)
Italics	Fastest lap point(s)

Notes:

- † – Drivers did not finish the race, but were classified as they completed more than 90% of the race distance.
