= 2014 Pro Mazda Winterfest =

2014 Pro Mazda Winterfest season

Seasons
- ← 2013 2015 →

The 2014 Pro Mazda Winterfest was the first winter series of the 16-year-old championship. It consisted of four races held during two race meets and was run alongside the 2014 U.S. F2000 Winterfest and Indy Lights series tests.

American Spencer Pigot scored two poles, four fastest-laps and two wins on his way to the championship. A controversial race start in race two gave Canadian Garett Grist the win in race two and fellow Canadian rookie Scott Hargrove won round four. Hargrove and Grist finished second and third in points, respectively. Rookies Shelby Blackstock and Pipo Derani also recorded podium finishes and finished fourth and fifth in points.

== Drivers and teams ==
Team	No.	Drivers	Notes
(United States) Andretti Autosport	27	(Canada) Garett Grist	
(United States) Andretti Autosport	28	(United States) Shelby Blackstock	
(United States) Cape Motorsports w/ Wayne Taylor Racing	2	(United States) Neil Alberico	
(United States) Cape Motorsports w/ Wayne Taylor Racing	3	(Canada) Scott Hargrove	
(United States) JDC Motorsports	54	(United States) Michael Johnson	
(United States) JDC Motorsports	91	(United States) Kyle Connery	Barber only
(United States) Juncos Racing	5	(Mexico) Jose Gutierrez	
(United States) Juncos Racing	6	(Argentina) Julia Ballario	
(United States) Juncos Racing	7	(United States) Spencer Pigot	
(United States) Juncos Racing	18	(United States) Kyle Kaiser	
(United States) M1 Racing	37	(United States) Jay Horak	Expert class; Barber only
(United States) Team Pelfrey	80	(Canada) Dalton Kellett	
(United States) Team Pelfrey	81	(Brazil) Pipo Derani	
(United States) Team Pelfrey	82	(United States) Brandon Newey	Barber only
(United States) World Speed Motorsports	13	(United States) Bobby Eberle	Expert class
(United States) World Speed Motorsports	16	(Philippines) Michele Bumgarner	

== Race calendar and results ==
The series schedule, along with the other Road to Indy series', was announced on October 24, 2013.

Rnd	Circuit	Location	Date	Pole position	Fastest lap	Most laps led	Winning driver	Winning team
1	NOLA Motorsports Park	Avondale, Louisiana	February 21	(United States) Spencer Pigot	(United States) Spencer Pigot	(United States) Spencer Pigot	(United States) Spencer Pigot	(United States) Juncos Racing
2	NOLA Motorsports Park	Avondale, Louisiana	February 22		(United States) Spencer Pigot	(Canada) Garett Grist	(Canada) Garett Grist	(United States) Andretti Autosport
3	Barber Motorsports Park	Birmingham, Alabama	February 25	(United States) Spencer Pigot	(United States) Spencer Pigot	(United States) Spencer Pigot	(United States) Spencer Pigot	(United States) Juncos Racing
4	Barber Motorsports Park	Birmingham, Alabama	February 26		(United States) Spencer Pigot	(Canada) Scott Hargrove	(Canada) Scott Hargrove	(United States) Cape Motorsports

== Championship standings ==
=== Drivers' ===
Pos	Driver	NOL (United States)		BAR (United States)		Points
Overall
1	(United States) Spencer Pigot	**1***	2	**1***	2	118
2	(Canada) Scott Hargrove	5	4	2	1*	92
3	(Canada) Garett Grist	4	1*	4	3	91
4	(United States) Shelby Blackstock	2	7	6	6	69
5	(Brazil) Pipo Derani	7	3	3	11	68
6	(United States) Kyle Kaiser	3	5	12	4	67
7	(Mexico) Jose Gutierrez	9	6	7	7	55
8	(United States) Neil Alberico	15	9	5	5	54
9	(Canada) Dalton Kellett	6	8	10	10	50
10	(United States) Michael Johnson	8	10	11	9	46
11	(Argentina) Julia Ballario	10	11	13	15	35
12	(Philippines) Michele Bumgarner	12	12	14	12	34
13	(United States) Bobby Eberle	11	13	15	13	32
14	(United States) Brandon Newey			9	8	25
15	(United States) Kyle Connery			8	16	14
16	(United States) Jay Horak			16	14	12
Pos	Driver	NOL (United States)		BAR (United States)		Points

Color	Result
Gold	Winner
Silver	2nd place
Bronze	3rd place
Green	4th & 5th place
Light Blue	6th–10th place
Dark Blue	Finished (Outside Top 10)
Purple	Did not finish
Red	Did not qualify (DNQ)
Brown	Withdrawn (Wth)
Black	Disqualified (DSQ)
White	Did not start (DNS)
Blank	Did not participate (DNP)
Blank	Not competing

**In-line notation**
**Bold**	Pole position (1 point)
Italics	Ran fastest race lap (1 point)
*	Led most race laps (1 point)

Position	1	2	3	4	5	6	7	8	9	10	11	12	13	14	15	16	17	18	19	20
Overall points	30	25	22	19	17	15	14	13	12	11	10	9	8	7	6	5	4	3	2	1

- Drivers must complete 50% race distance to score main points, otherwise 1 point is awarded.

=== Teams' ===
Pos	Team	Points
1	(United States) Juncos Racing	123
2	(United States) Andretti Autosport	103
3	(United States) Cape Motorsports w/ WTR	87
4	(United States) Team Pelfrey	60
5	(United States) JDC Motorsports	22
6	(United States) World Speed Motorsports	9
7	(United States) M1 Racing	8
