= 2015 Pro Mazda Winterfest =

2015 Pro Mazda Winterfest season

Seasons
- ← 2014 2016 →

The 2015 Pro Mazda Championship Winterfest was the second winter championship promoted by the series, the first being in 2014. It served as a prelude to the 2015 Pro Mazda Championship season. It consisted of five races held during two race meets, alongside the 2015 U.S. F2000 Winterfest. The previous edition included only four races, with two at each track.

Team Pelfrey's Jack Aitken and Andretti Autosport driver Weiron Tan were the main title protagonists, sharing all five victories between them. Tan amassed the most points with race results – two wins and three second places – but a five-point penalty for unsportsmanlike conduct on the podium at NOLA Motorsports Park allowed Aitken to take the championship title by one point ahead of Tan. Third place went to Tan's team-mate Dalton Kellett, who took his only podium finish in the final race at Barber Motorsports Park, which awarded double points after one of the track's scheduled three races was canceled due to bad weather.

== Drivers and teams ==
All teams are American-registered.

Team	No.	Drivers	Notes
Andretti Autosport	22	(Malaysia) Weiron Tan	
Andretti Autosport	28	(Canada) Dalton Kellett	
Cape Motorsports; Wayne Taylor Racing	2	(Canada) Daniel Burkett	
Cape Motorsports; Wayne Taylor Racing	10	(France) Florian Latorre	
JDC Motorsports	19	(United Kingdom) Raoul Owens	
JDC Motorsports	54	(United States) Michael Johnson	
Juncos Racing	5	(Canada) Garett Grist	
Juncos Racing	6	(France) Timothé Buret	
Juncos Racing	7	(Mexico) Jose Gutierrez	
Juncos Racing	23	(United States) Will Owen	
M1 Racing	18	(Canada) Nicholas Latifi	
M1 Racing	24	(United States) Tristan DeGrand	Barber only
M1 Racing	33	(Puerto Rico) Carlos Conde	Expert class; NOLA only
Team Pelfrey	82	(United Kingdom) Jack Aitken	
World Speed Motorsports	13	(United States) Bobby Eberle	Expert class
World Speed Motorsports	14	(United Kingdom) Alessandro Latif	

== Race calendar and results ==
The series schedule, along with the other Road to Indy series schedules, was announced on November 3, 2014.

Rnd	Circuit	Location	Date	Pole position	Fastest lap	Most laps led	Winning driver	Winning team
1	NOLA Motorsports Park	Avondale, Louisiana	February 19	(United Kingdom) Jack Aitken	(Malaysia) Weiron Tan	(United Kingdom) Jack Aitken	(United Kingdom) Jack Aitken	Team Pelfrey
2	NOLA Motorsports Park	Avondale, Louisiana	February 20		(Malaysia) Weiron Tan	(Malaysia) Weiron Tan	(Malaysia) Weiron Tan	Andretti Autosport
3	NOLA Motorsports Park	Avondale, Louisiana	February 20		(United Kingdom) Jack Aitken	(United Kingdom) Jack Aitken	(United Kingdom) Jack Aitken	Team Pelfrey
4	Barber Motorsports Park	Birmingham, Alabama	February 25	Canceled due to weather				
5	Barber Motorsports Park	Birmingham, Alabama	February 26		(United States) Will Owen	(United Kingdom) Jack Aitken	(United Kingdom) Jack Aitken	Team Pelfrey
6	Barber Motorsports Park	Birmingham, Alabama	February 26		(United Kingdom) Jack Aitken	(Malaysia) Weiron Tan	(Malaysia) Weiron Tan	Andretti Autosport

== Championship standings ==
=== Drivers' championship ===
- Due to the cancelation of the first race at Barber Motorsports Park, double points were awarded in the final race of the championship.

Pos	Driver	NOL			BAR			Points
1	(United Kingdom) Jack Aitken	**1***	4	1*	C	1*	2	167
2	(Malaysia) Weiron Tan	2	1*	2	C	2	1*	166
3	(Canada) Dalton Kellett	6	13	7	C	5	3	98
4	(France) Florian Latorre	7	5	8	C	3	6	96
5	(Canada) Garett Grist	5	14	4	C	7	5	91
6	(United States) Will Owen	3	3	6	C	14	14	83
7	(United Kingdom) Raoul Owens	4	6	12	C	4	12	80
8	(Mexico) José Gutiérrez	15	8	5	C	8	7	77
9	(France) Timothé Buret	9	7	9	C	6	9	77
10	(United Kingdom) Alessandro Latif	11	11	11	C	10	8	67
11	(United States) Michael Johnson	10	9	10	C	11	10	66
12	(Canada) Nicholas Latifi	14	2	3	C	15	DNS	60
13	(United States) Bobby Eberle	12	10	13	C	12	13	53
14	(United States) Tristan DeGrand				C	9	4	50
15	(Canada) Daniel Burkett	8	15	DNS	C	13	11	47
16	(Puerto Rico) Carlos Conde	13	12	14				24
Expert class
1	(United States) Bobby Eberle	12	10	13	C	12	13	110
2	(Puerto Rico) Carlos Conde	13	12	14				54
Pos	Driver	NOL			BAR			Points

Color	Result
Gold	Winner
Silver	2nd place
Bronze	3rd place
Green	4th & 5th place
Light Blue	6th–10th place
Dark Blue	Finished (Outside Top 10)
Purple	Did not finish
Red	Did not qualify (DNQ)
Brown	Withdrawn (Wth)
Black	Disqualified (DSQ)
White	Did not start (DNS)
White	Race canceled (C)
Blank	Did not participate

**In-line notation** Championship Class only
**Bold**	Pole position (1 point)
Italics	Ran fastest race lap (1 point)
*	Led most race laps (1 point)

=== Teams' championship ===
Pos	Team	Points
1	(United States) Andretti Autosport	177
2	(United States) Team Pelfrey	132
3	(United States) Juncos Racing	66
4	(United States) M1 Racing	61
5	(United States) Cape Motorsports w/ WTR	22
6	(United States) JDC Motorsports	50
7	(United States) World Speed Motorsports	21
