= Jack Aitken =

British and South Korean racing driver (born 1995)

- 한세용
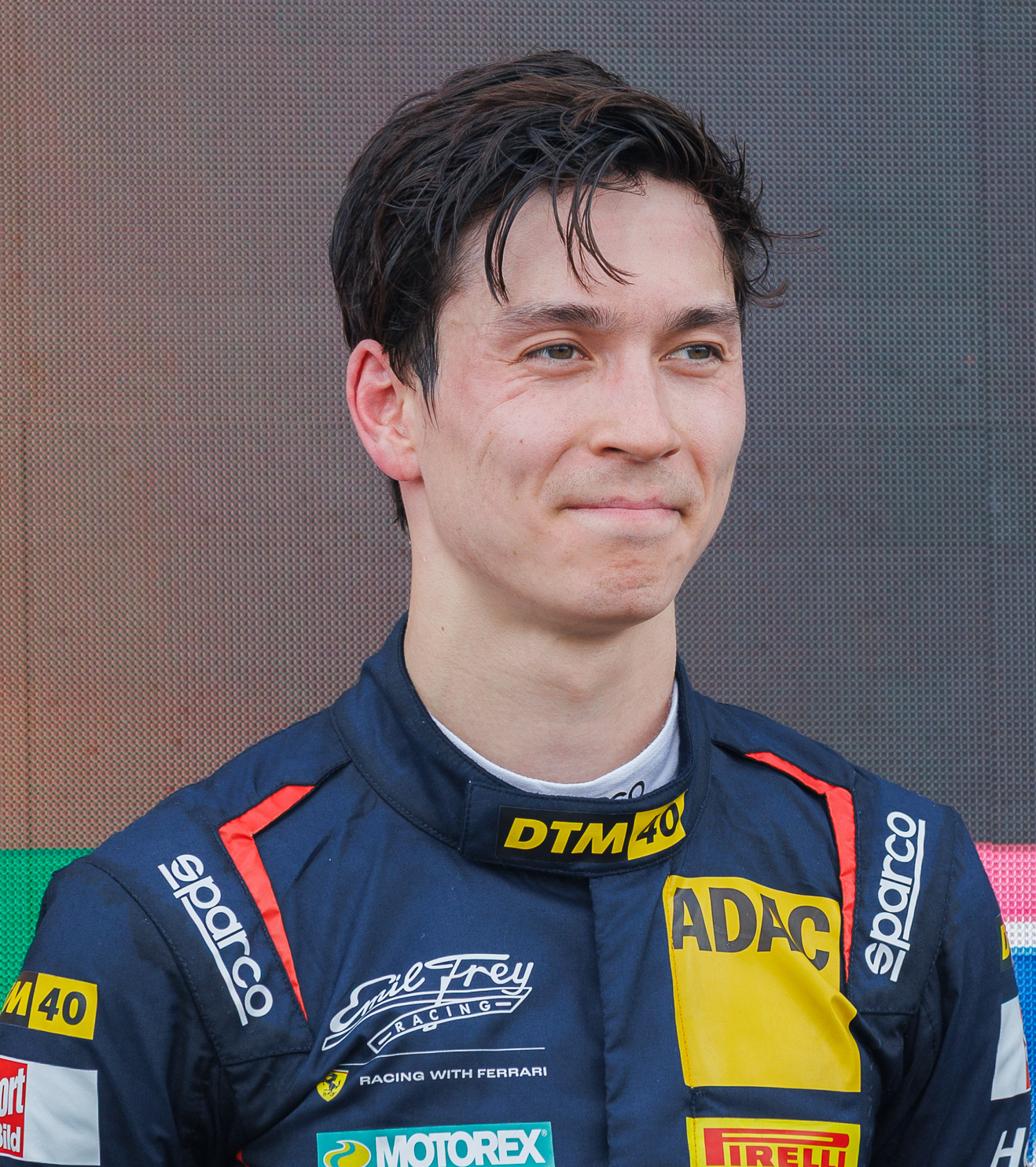
- Aitken in 2024
- Born: Jack Anthony Han-Aitken; 23 September 1995 (age 31); London, England

IMSA SportsCar Championship career
- Debut season: 2023
- Current team: Cadillac Whelen
- Categorisation: FIA Gold (2021–2022); FIA Platinum (2023–)
- Car number: 31
- Starts: 31
- Championships: 1
- Wins: 5
- Podiums: 14
- Poles: 9
- Fastest laps: 6
- Best finish: 1st in 2026 (GTP)

Deutsche Tourenwagen Masters career
- Debut season: 2023
- Current team: Emil Frey
- Car number: 14
- Starts: 46
- Championships: 0
- Wins: 6
- Podiums: 9
- Poles: 8
- Fastest laps: 4
- Best finish: 8th in 2024, 2025

Formula One World Championship career
- Nationality: (United Kingdom) British
- Active years: 2020
- Team: Williams
- Entries: 1 (1 start)
- Championships: 0
- Wins: 0
- Podiums: 0
- Career points: 0
- Pole positions: 0
- Fastest laps: 0
- First entry: 2020 Sakhir Grand Prix

24 Hours of Le Mans career
- Years: 2022–2026
- Teams: Algarve Pro Racing, AXR, Jota Sport
- Best finish: 17th (2023)
- Class wins: 0

Previous series
- 2022; 2022; 2021–2022; 2018–2021; 2016–2017; 2016; 2016; 2015; 2014–2015; 2013–2015; 2013: ELMS; ADAC GT Masters; GTWC Europe; FIA Formula 2; GP3 Series; Formula V8 3.5; Euroformula Open; Pro Mazda Winterfest; Formula Renault Eurocup; Formula Renault 2.0 Alps; Formula Renault NEC

Championship titles
- 2026; 2023; 2015; 2015; 2015: IMSA SportsCar Championship; IMSA Endurance Cup; Formula Renault Eurocup; Formula Renault 2.0 Alps; Pro Mazda Winterfest

Jack Anthony Han-Aitken (Korean: 한세용, Han Se-yong; born 23 September 1995) is a British and South Korean racing driver competing in the IMSA SportsCar Championship for Cadillac Whelen, and in the FIA World Endurance Championship for Cadillac Hertz Team Jota. He is the 2026 IMSA GTP drivers' champion. Aitken made one Formula One start for Williams in 2020.

Born in London to a Scottish father and South Korean mother, Aitken won the Formula Renault Eurocup in 2015 and was a Renault junior in the GP3 Series and Formula 2. While serving as Williams' reserve driver in Formula One, Aitken filled in for George Russell at the 2020 Sakhir Grand Prix. In sports car racing, Aitken raced in the DTM for Emil Frey Racing, and made his GTP debut in 2023 for Cadillac.

== Early and personal life ==
Jack Anthony Han-Aitken was born on 23 September 1995 in London to a Scottish father and South Korean mother. Aitken holds dual British and South Korean citizenship.

== Junior racing career ==
=== Karting ===
Aitken started his karting career at Buckmore Park Kart Circuit in Kent aged seven. He competed in the 2010 Super 1 National Kart Championships in the Rotax Mini Max class, with ProTrain racing alongside Jack Hawksworth, finishing third behind champion and future Formula 2 teammate George Russell.

=== Formula Renault ===
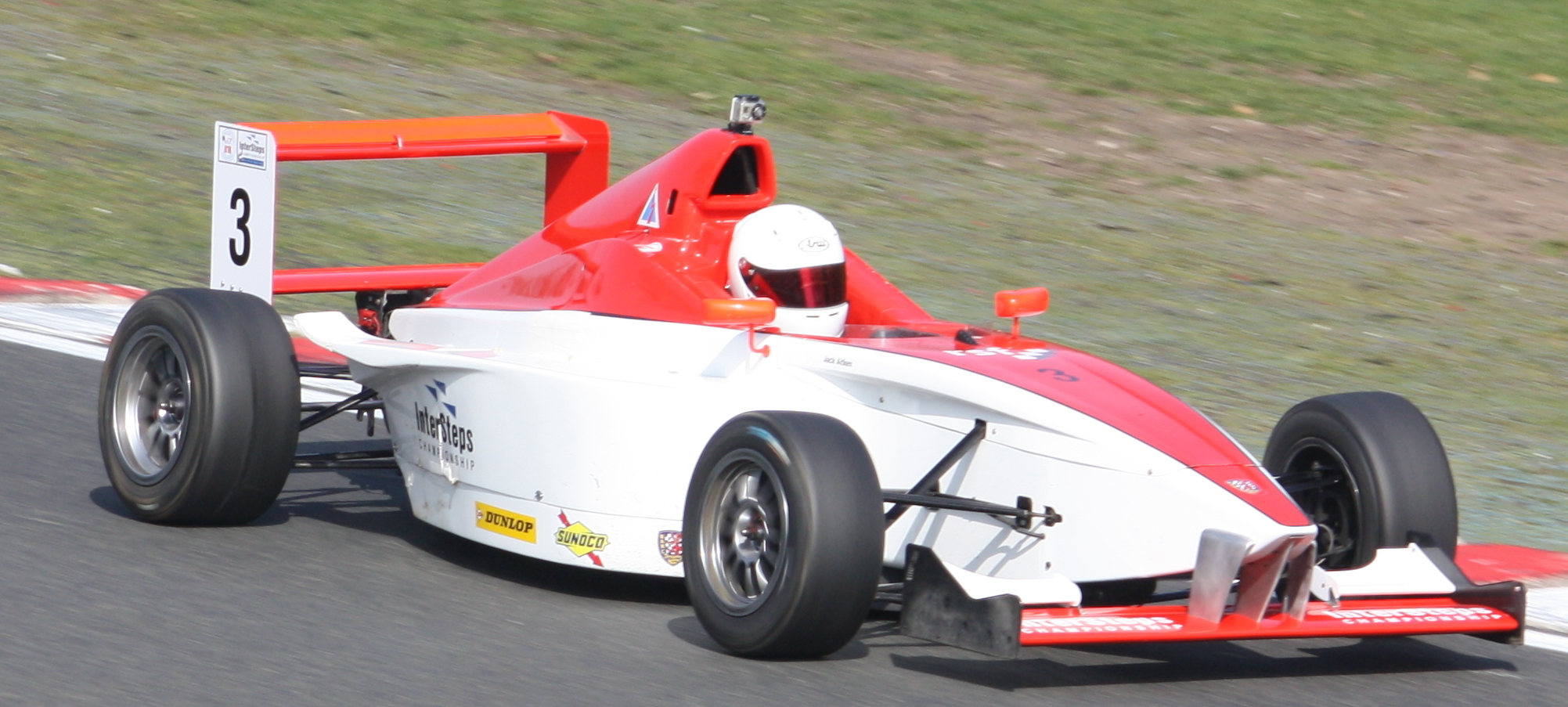
Aitken made his car racing debut in 2012 finishing third in the Intersteps Championship.

Aitken progressed into single-seater car racing in 2012, competing in the four races of the 2012 Formula Renault BARC Winter Series. He won the final race at Rockingham Motor Speedway and finished second in the standings behind Fortec Motorsport teammate Seb Morris. He also competed for Fortec in the 2012 Dunlop InterSteps Championship, taking two wins to finish third in the championship behind future GP3 Series competitor Matt Parry.

In 2013, Aitken competed in the Formula Renault 2.0 Northern European Cup, in a field which included future Formula One drivers Esteban Ocon and Alex Albon. He finished second in the championship, again losing out to Fortec teammate Parry. Aitken also appeared as a guest driver in three rounds of the main Eurocup Formula Renault 2.0 series, recording a best finish of ninth place at the Red Bull Ring.

Aitken entered his first full season of Eurocup Formula Renault 2.0 in 2014 with Fortec. He won one race at the Hungaroring and finished on the podium three further times to end the season seventh in the championship. During the first half of the campaign, he had to finish his A-Level qualifications while attending Westminster School. He also made guest appearances in the Formula Renault 2.0 Alps series, with best finishes of fourth place at the Imola Circuit.

For 2015, Aitken moved to Koiranen GP in Formula Renault 2.0, contesting both the Eurocup and Alps series. He won both titles at the final rounds at the Circuito de Jerez, one week apart. He took nine race wins in total, finishing ahead of Louis Delétraz in the Eurocup and Jake Hughes in the Alps series.

=== Pro Mazda Championship ===
Aitken made his first appearance in American open-wheel racing in 2014, competing in one round of the Pro Mazda Championship (now the Indy Pro 2000 Championship) at the Sonoma Raceway with a best finish of fourth place. In 2015, he took part in the Pro Mazda Winterfest for Team Pelfrey. He won three of the five races to win the championship ahead of future IndyCar driver Dalton Kellett and future Williams Formula One teammate Nicholas Latifi.

=== GP3 Series ===
==== 2016 ====
In January 2016, Aitken stepped up to the GP3 Series with Arden International. In his maiden season, he claimed a victory at Spa-Francorchamps and six additional podiums to finish fifth in the overall standings, one point behind teammate Jake Dennis. In that year, Aitken also made brief appearances in the Euroformula Open and Formula V8 3.5 series, claiming two wins and two pole positions in four races in Euroformula Open and a pole position in Formula V8 3.5.

==== 2017 ====
In February 2017, it was announced that Aitken would remain in the GP3 Series, switching to reigning team champions ART Grand Prix. He took one race win at the Hungaroring and five further podium finishes, finishing second in the championship with 141 points, behind champion and former karting rival George Russell on 220 points.

=== Formula 2 ===
==== 2018 ====
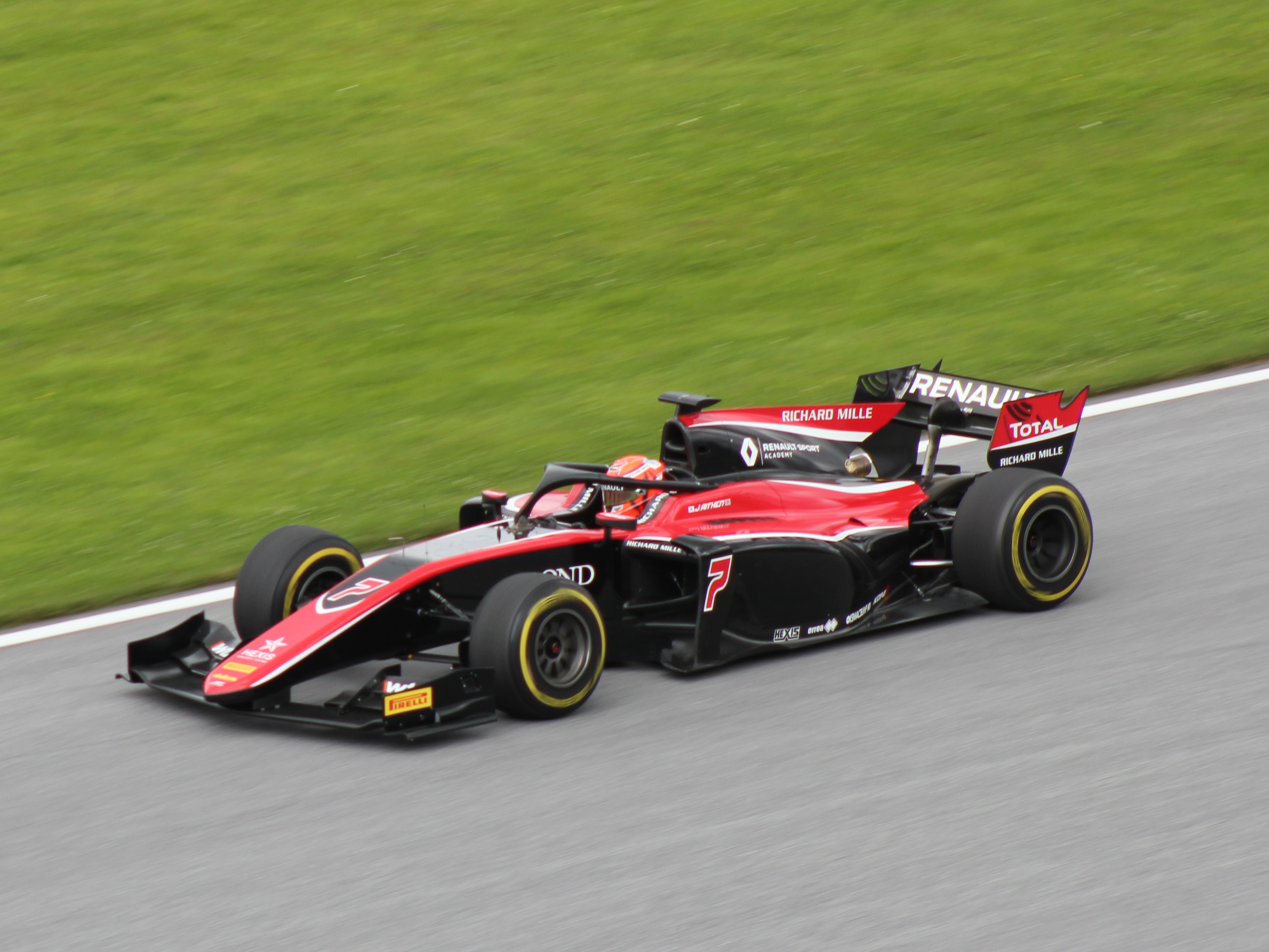
Aitken at the 2018 Spielberg Formula 2 round

In January 2018, ART Grand Prix announced Aitken would join their Formula 2 team for the 2018 FIA Formula 2 Championship, again partnering Russell. He took his first podium finish with second place in the Baku feature race, and later took his first victory in the Barcelona sprint race. He finished 11th in the championship with 63 points, whilst Russell claimed the title with 287 points.

==== 2019 ====
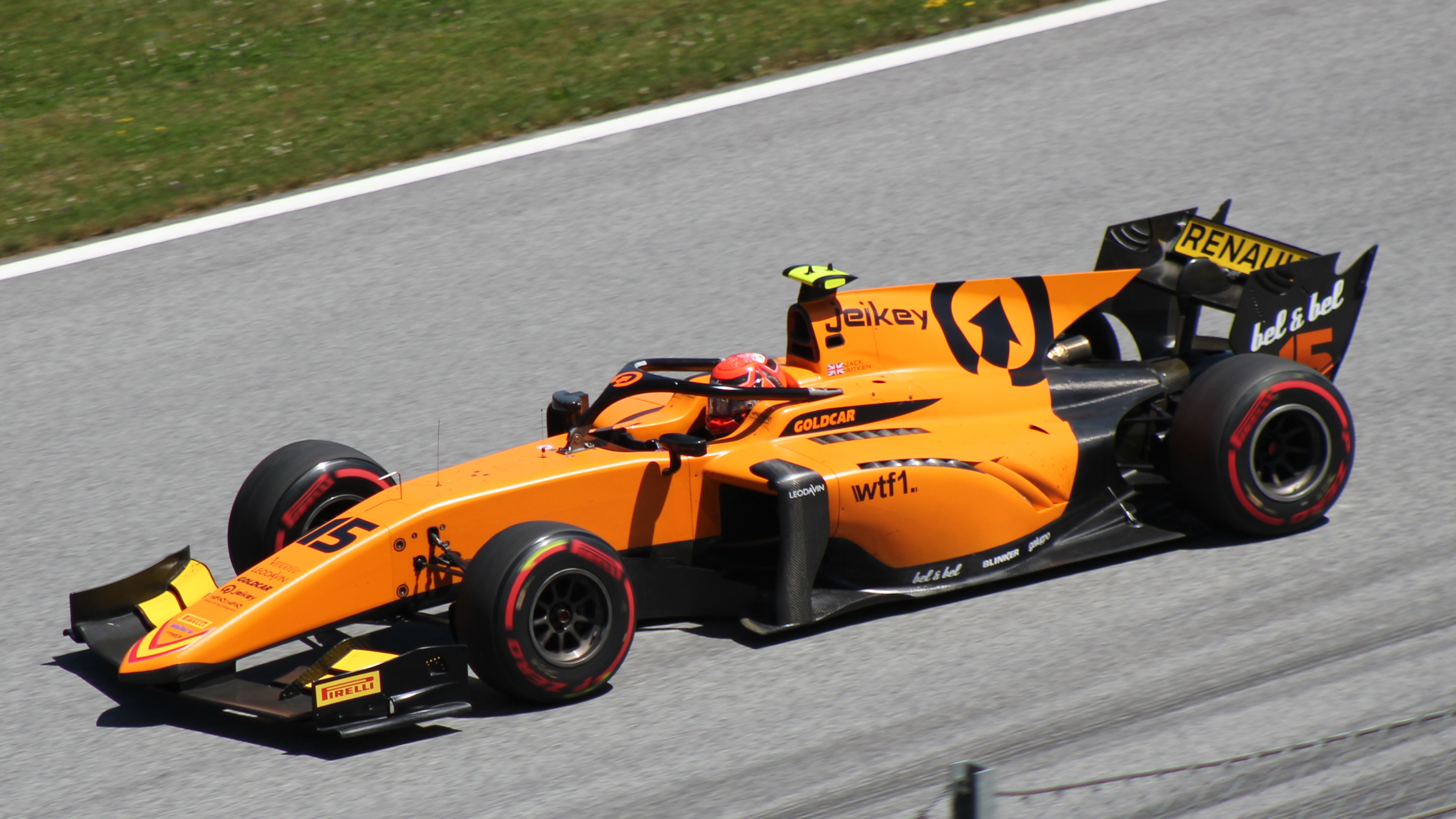
Aitken with Campos Racing in 2019

For the 2019 season, Aitken moved to Campos Racing, initially partnering Dorian Boccolacci and later Arjun Maini and Marino Sato. Aitken took his first win of the season, and Campos Racing's first win in Formula 2, at the Baku feature race. He also won his home sprint race at Silverstone, after overtaking Louis Delétraz on lap 17. Aitken also won the Monza sprint race after defending from the MP Motorsport car of Jordan King. King criticised Aitken's defensive driving as he claimed after the race that Aitken was weaving down the straight. Aitken finished fifth in the standings, scoring 159 of Campos' 189 points and helping them to finish fifth in the teams' championship.

==== 2020 ====
Aitken remained at Campos for 2020, partnering Guilherme Samaia. Aitken took a double-podium finish at the second Silverstone round, finishing third in both the feature race and sprint race. He was involved in a high-speed collision with Luca Ghiotto on lap seven of the sprint race at Sochi. Both drivers were uninjured, but damage to the barriers caused the race to be red-flagged and not restarted. Aitken missed the final round at the Bahrain to race in Formula One, and was replaced by Ralph Boschung. Aitken finished 14th in the standings, scoring all of Campos' 48 points.

==== 2021 ====
Aitken left Campos and the Formula 2 series after 2020, however he returned during the 2021 season with HWA Racelab as a replacement for Matteo Nannini, who withdrew from the championship after the first round. He was initially signed for the second and third rounds in Monaco and Baku respectively and was later retained for the fourth round at Silverstone. He recorded a best finish of ninth place in the second Monaco sprint race, but failed to score points over the three rounds.

== Formula One career ==
=== Renault test driver (2016–2019) ===
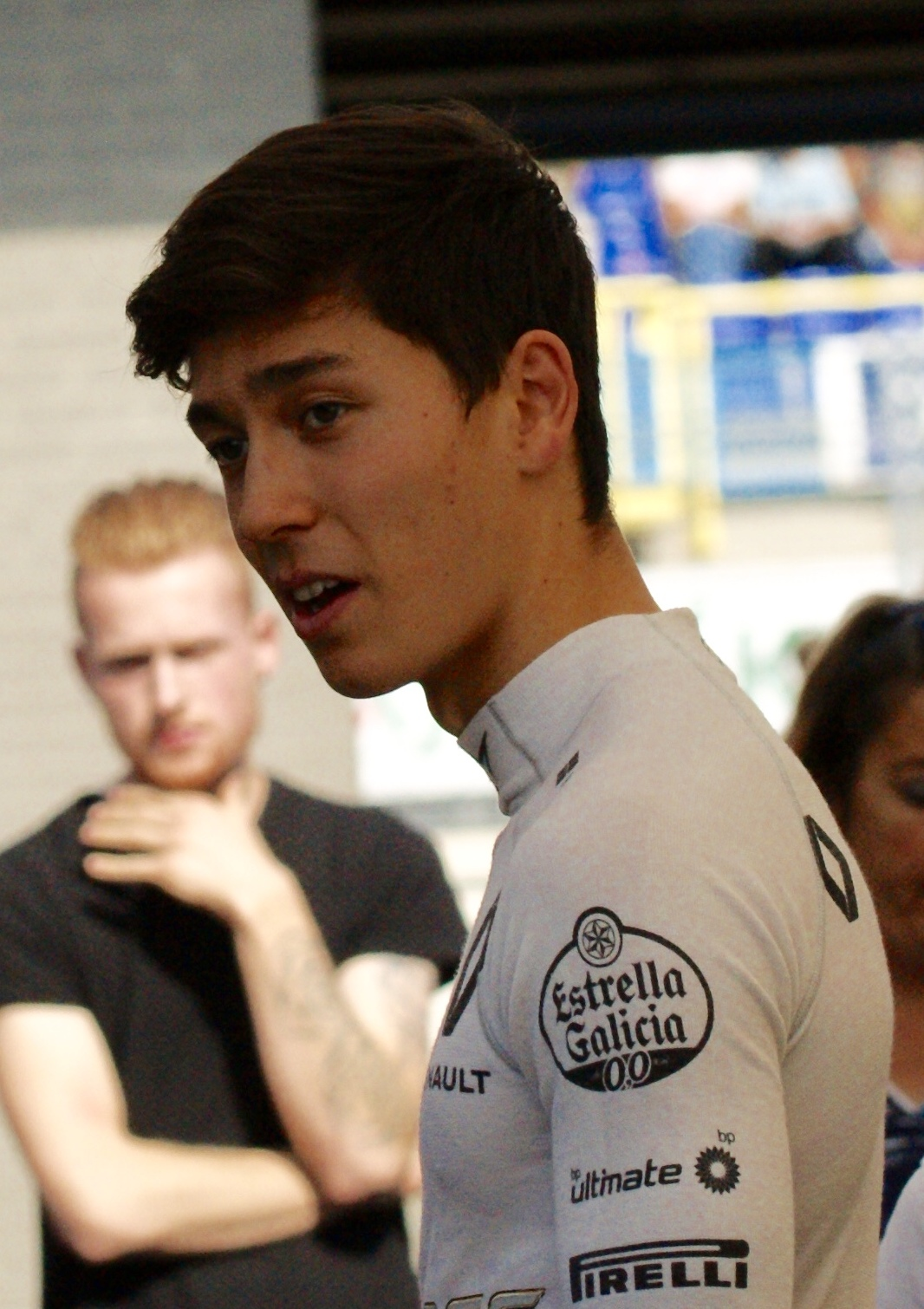
Aitken in 2018

In February 2016, Aitken was one of four drivers confirmed to join the young driver program of Renault F1. In September 2017, Aitken sampled Formula One machinery for the first time, testing the Lotus E20 at Jerez. In February 2018, Aitken was appointed as third and reserve driver for Renault. That year, he tested the Renault R.S.18 at the Circuit de Barcelona-Catalunya during the young drivers' test. Another test came at Suzuka where once again he drove the R.S.18. Aitken continued as test driver for Renault in 2019, and once again took part in the 2019 young drivers' test at Barcelona. In February 2020, Aitken left Renault.

=== Williams reserve driver (2020–2022) ===
For the 2020 season, Aitken joined the Williams Driver Academy alongside Formula 2 rivals Dan Ticktum and Roy Nissany, and W Series and Extreme E driver Jamie Chadwick. Aitken was also appointed Williams' reserve driver. He drove in the first practice session (FP1) of the 2020 Styrian Grand Prix for the team.

Aitken made his Formula One debut as a race driver with Williams at the 2020 Sakhir Grand Prix as a replacement for George Russell, who was promoted to Mercedes following Lewis Hamilton's positive coronavirus test. Aitken stated before the event he had been "ready since Melbourne [March]" for such an opportunity. He chose to race with the car number 89, a number he previously used in karting. He qualified for the race in 18th place, within a tenth of a second of teammate and regular driver Nicholas Latifi. On lap 61 of 87, 15th-placed Aitken spun at the final corner, colliding with a barrier and breaking off his front wing. He returned to the pits for a replacement and was able to continue the race, eventually finishing 16th. He later remarked that he had mixed feelings about the race, stating "I think we were doing a really good job up until my little incident. I can only apologise to the whole team", but that there were "a lot of positives to take from the weekend".

Aitken performed Thursday media duties with Williams ahead of the next race in Abu Dhabi but ultimately did not drive the car, as Russell returned to the team prior to FP1 when Hamilton was passed fit to return to Mercedes.

In March 2021, Williams announced that Aitken would continue to be their reserve driver for the 2021 season. He took part in FP1 at the Abu Dhabi Grand Prix, replacing Russell for the session.

Aitken retained his reserve driver role with Williams for the 2022 season despite George Russell leaving the team and Albon taking over the seat. He did not partake in any practice sessions that year, and at the start of 2023, he was announced that he would split with Williams, in order to focus on his sportscar career.

== Sportscar racing career ==
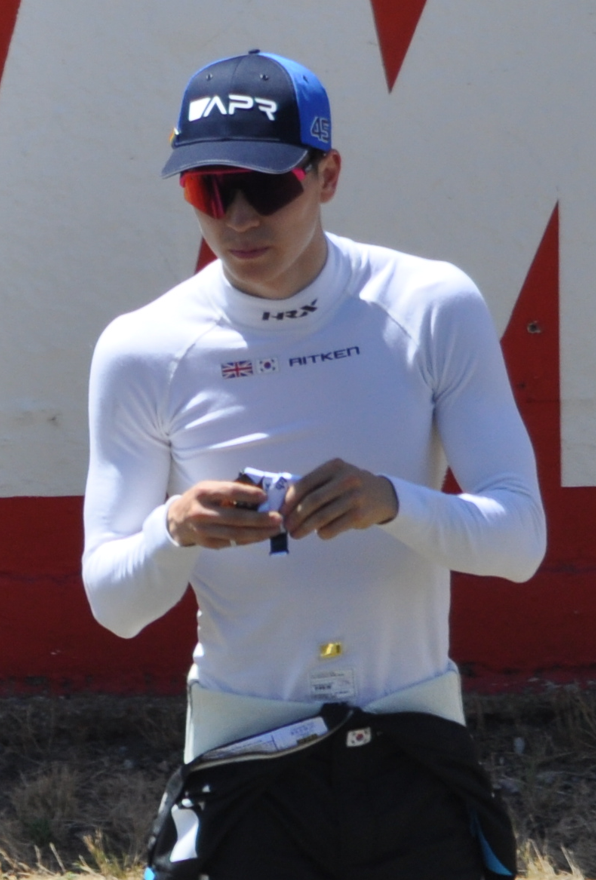
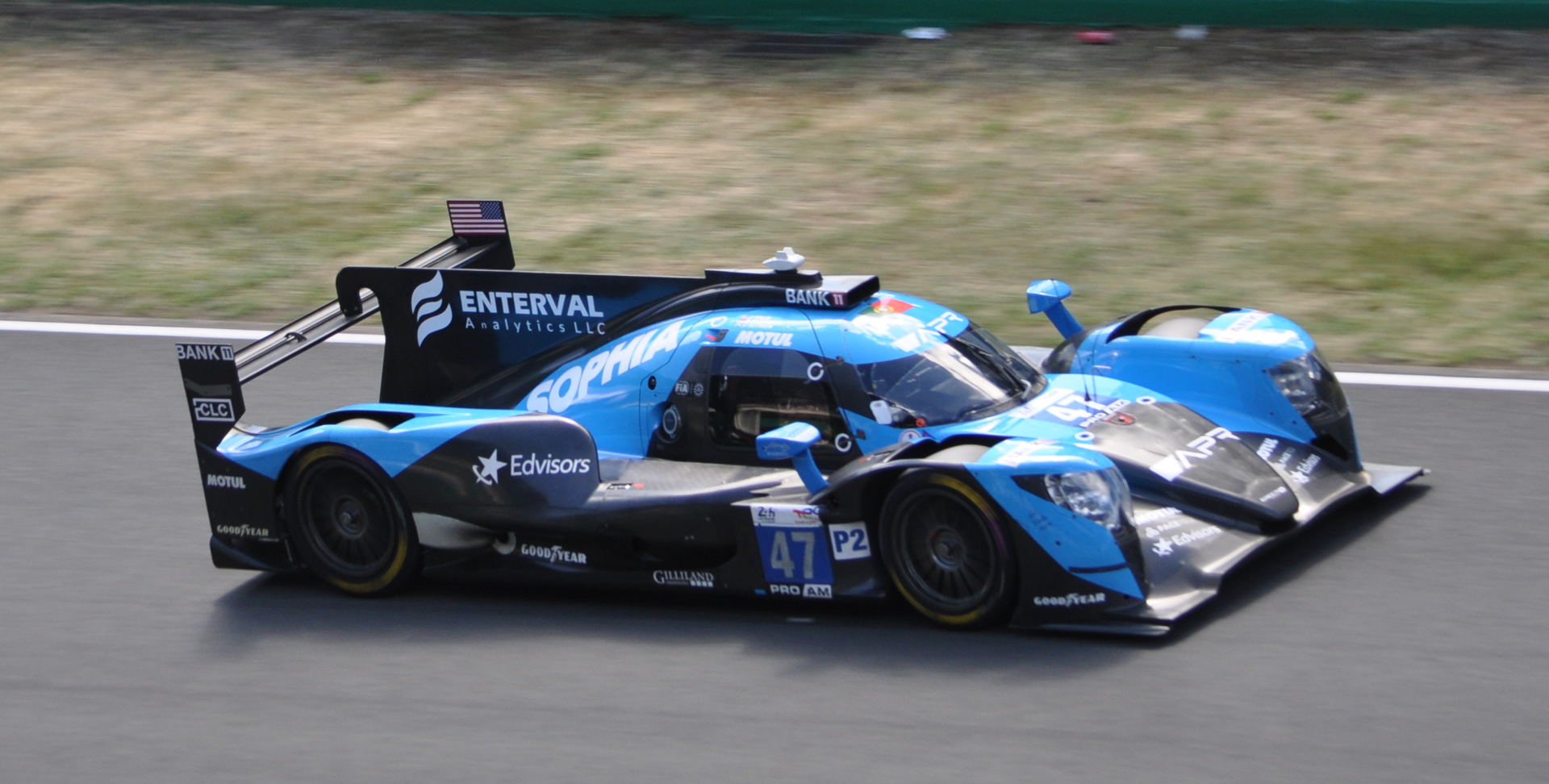
Aitken before the start of the 2022 edition (left) and his car, the No. 47 Algarve Pro Racing Oreca 07 (right).

=== 2021 season: First endurance racing season and serious crash ===
After leaving Campos in Formula 2, Aitken switched to sports car racing and joined the GT World Challenge Europe. He competes in both the Endurance and Sprint cups, driving a Lamborghini Huracán GT3 Evo for Emil Frey Racing alongside Konsta Lappalainen. His first race was the 3 Hours of Monza, for which Aitken and his teammates qualified 14th. However, Aitken did not drive in the race as the car was retired following damage from a puncture.

In July 2021 during the Spa 24 Hours event, Aitken was involved in a massive crash along with three other drivers. He crashed into the barrier after Raidillon, bounced back onto the track and came to a stop before being hit from behind by another driver which caused two further cars to become entangled in the accident. Aitken was taken to hospital where he stayed overnight. His injuries were described as non life-threatening though serious and it was later revealed that he had sustained "a broken collarbone, a fractured vertebra ... and a very small lung contusion".

=== 2022 season: First Le Mans race ===
In 2022, Aitken moved to the ADAC GT Masters, racing with Albert Costa for Emil Frey Racing.

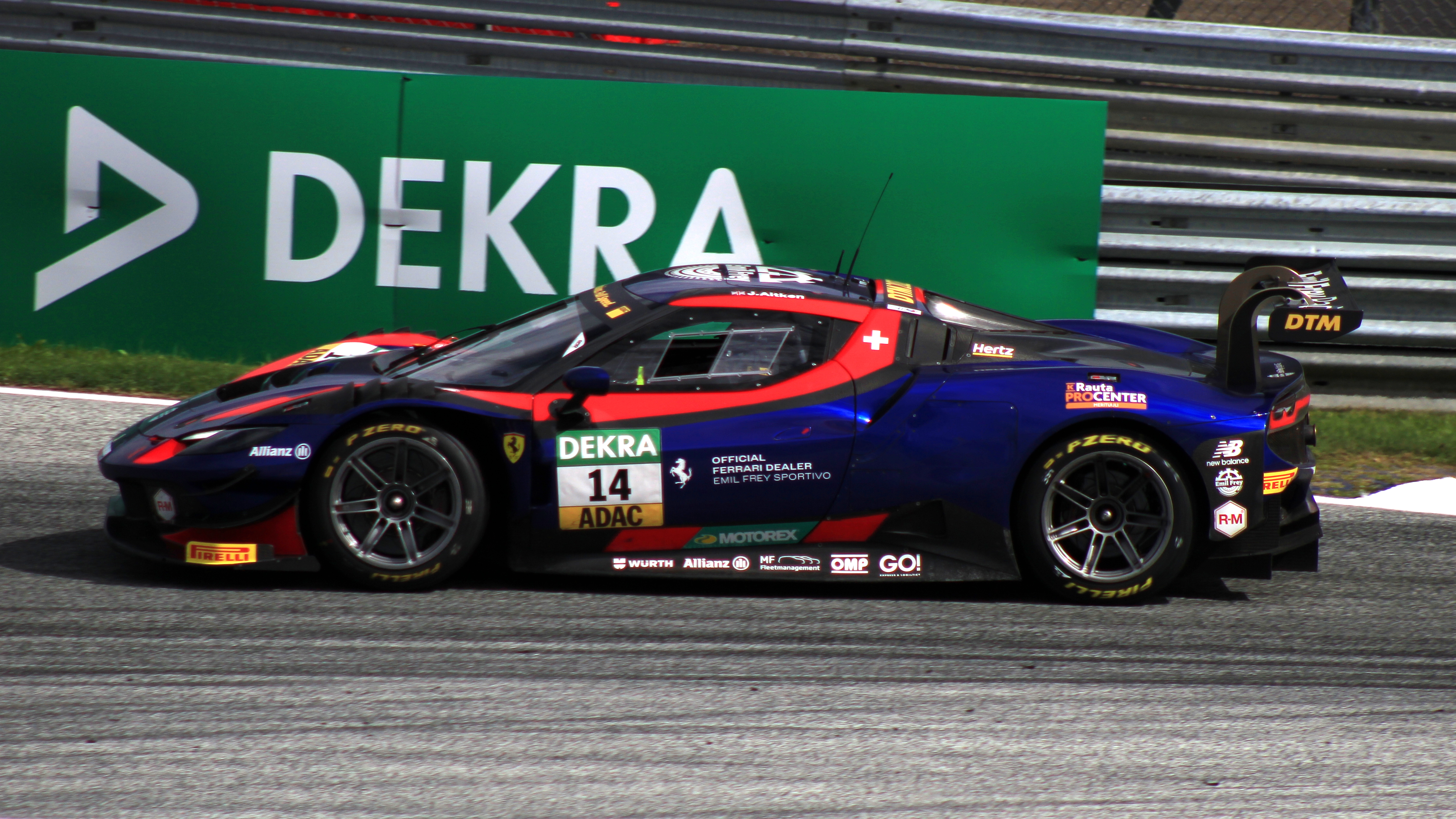
Aitken driving at the Red Bull Ring during the 2023 Deutsche Tourenwagen Masters season.

In 2022, Aitken competed in the LMP2 Pro-Am class for Racing Team Turkey alongside Charlie Eastwood and Salih Yoluç. Aitken and his team ended up finishing 11th in the standings.

For the 2022 season, Aitken also raced exclusively in the endurance rounds of the championship, pairing up with Mirko Bortolotti and Albert Costa in the same Emil Frey Racing Lamborghini. He finished 13th and 6th in the first two races, held in Imola and Paul Ricard respectively. In the 24 Hours of Spa, after a crash for Costa, Aitken failed to finish the race.

Aitken made his 24 Hours of Le Mans debut in the 2022 edition, competing for Algarve Pro Racing alongside Sophia Flörsch and John Falb. The trio finished 25th overall, 20th in the LMP2 class and 5th in the Pro-Am sub class.

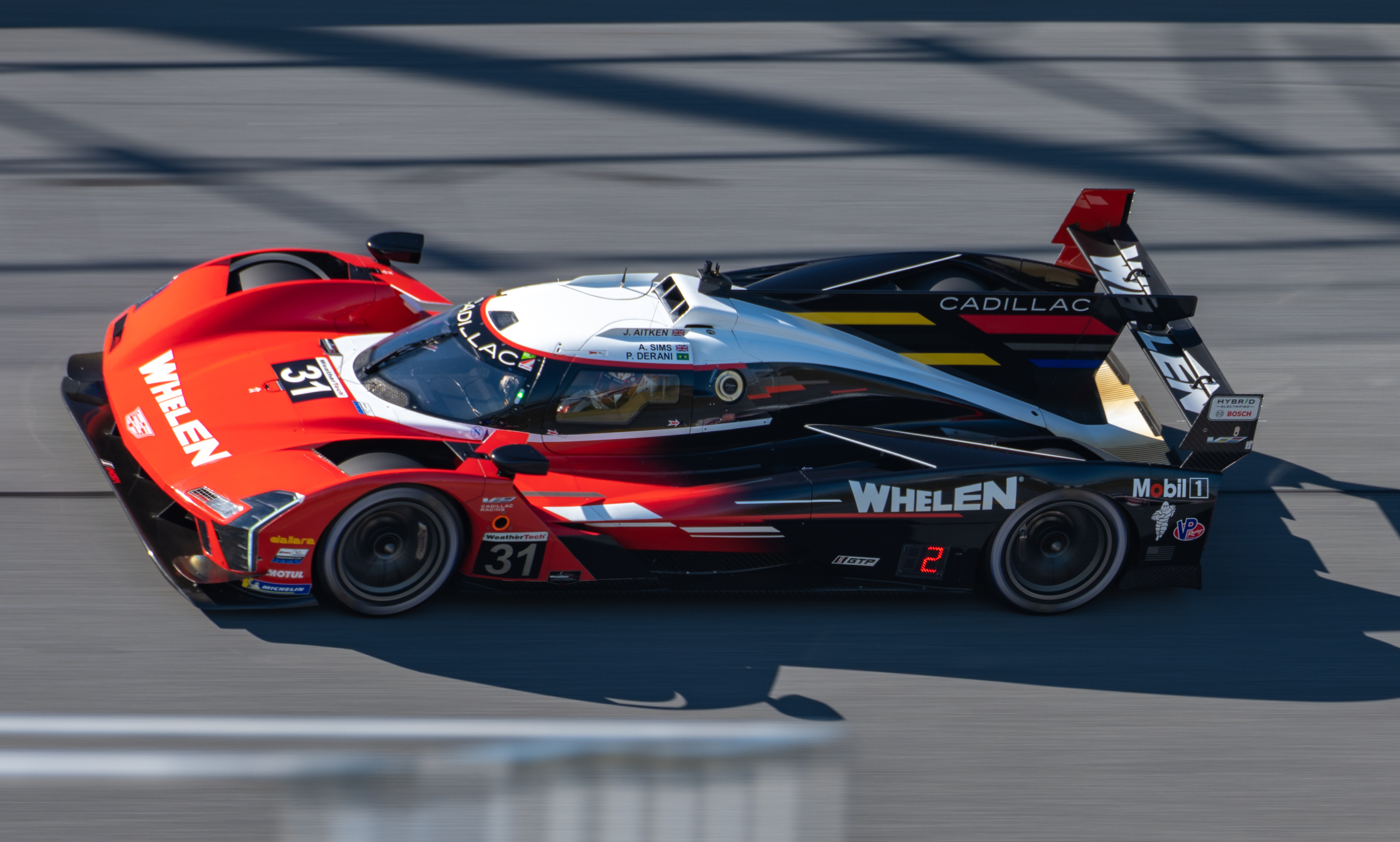
Aitken competing at the 2023 24 Hours of Daytona.

=== 2023 season: GTP and first DTM season ===
For the 2023 season, Aitken would perform double-duties in America and Europe, racing the new Cadillac V-LMDh in the IMSA SportsCar Championship for Whelen Engineering Racing whilst also contesting the DTM with Emil Frey Racing. He won the 12 Hours of Sebring March 18 after the GTP cars in front of him crashed into each other with only minutes left in the race.

=== 2024 season: Full-time IMSA driver and return to DTM ===
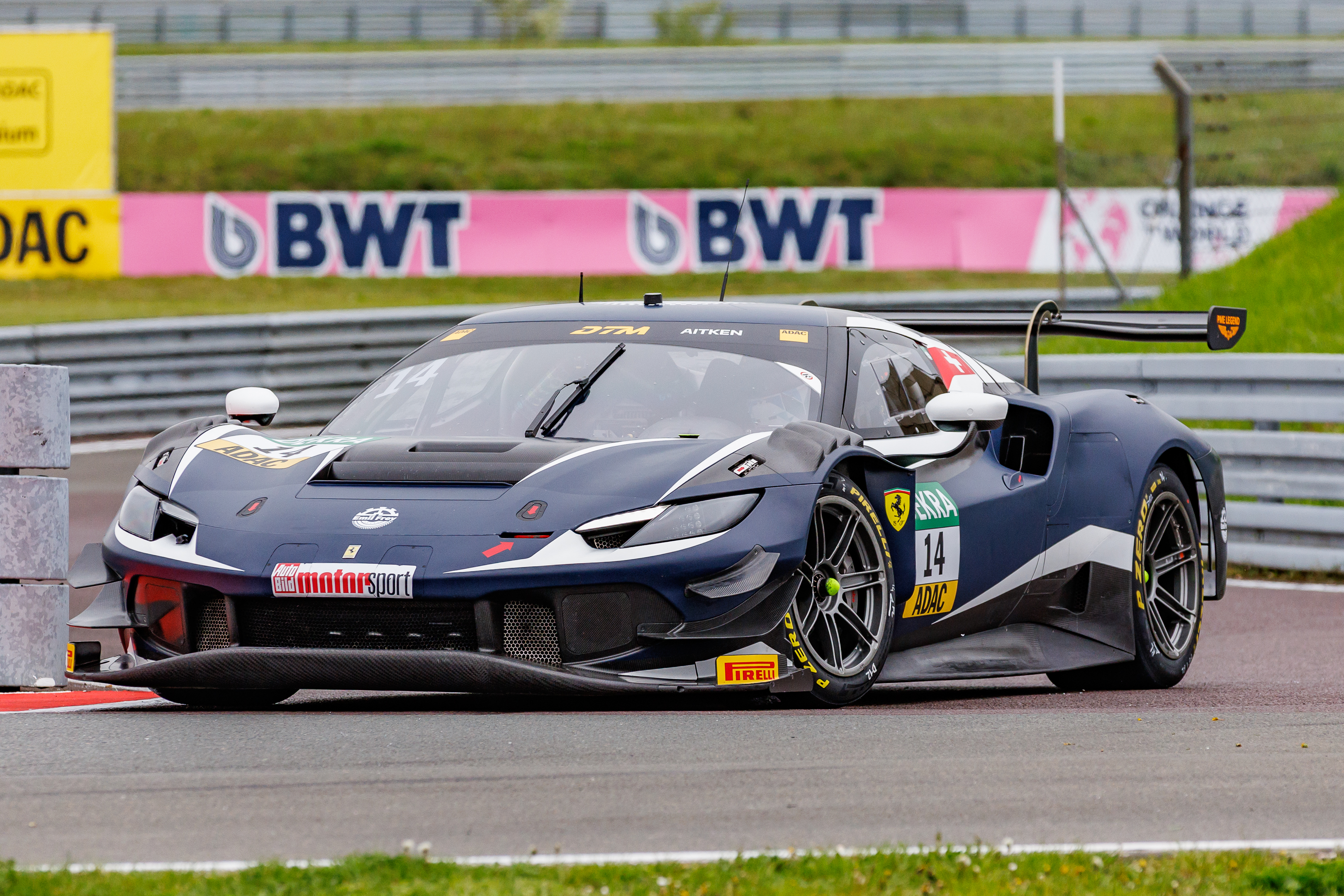
Aitken at Motorsport Arena Oschersleben in 2025

In August 2023, it was announced that Aitken would be a full-time IMSA driver in 2024 for Action Express Racing alongside Pipo Derani. He also returned to DTM for 2024 with Emil Frey Racing.

=== 2025 season ===
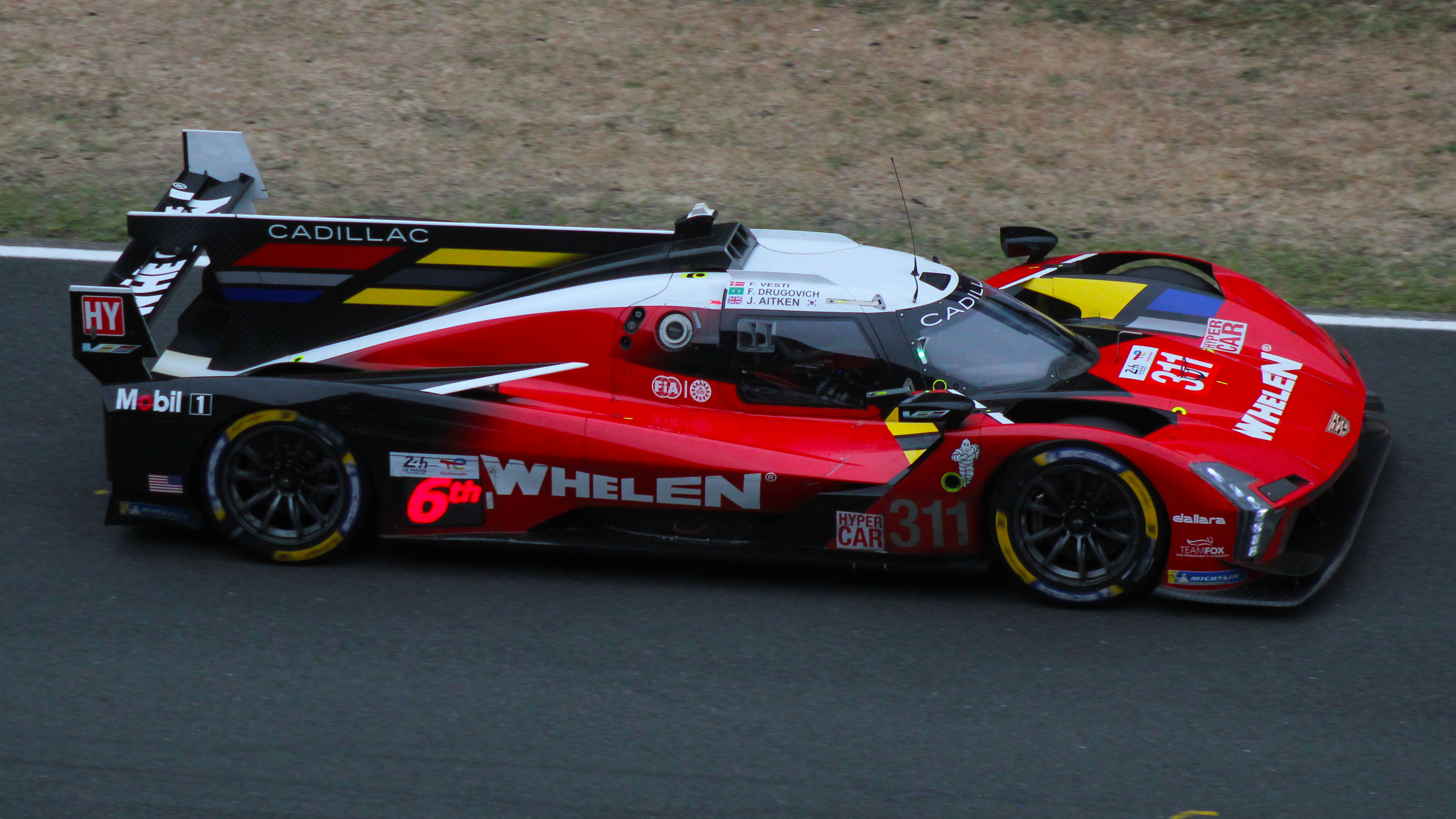
Aitken's No. 311 car at the 2025 24 Hours of Le Mans

Aitken continued as a full-time IMSA driver in 2025 at Action Express Racing, with teammates in Earl Bamber and Frederik Vesti. He finished the season as runner-up following consecutive victories in the final two races at Indianapolis and Road Atlanta. Aitken contested the 2025 DTM season with Emil Frey Racing once again, finishing eight in the championship with two victories. He announced his departure from the championship soon after to focus on his other racing commitments in 2026.

As part of the No. 311 Cadillac Whelen entry, Aitken did not finish the 2025 edition of the 24 Hours of Le Mans due to a loss of drive in the 17th hour.

=== 2026 season: Full-time WEC debut ===
Aitken competes in the FIA World Endurance Championship full-time in 2026 for Cadillac Hertz Team Jota, driving the No. 38 car in place of the retiring Jenson Button. During the season finale 2026 6 Hours of Monza, Aitken led the early portions of the race before leaving the track early to be there for the birth of his first child. Co-drivers Bamber and Sébastien Bourdais drove the car home to secure the team's first and only victory that year, doubling as Aitken's first overall WEC victory.

== Formula E ==
Aitken joined Envision Racing in Formula E to partake in the rookie test at the Tempelhof Airport Street Circuit during late April 2023. He partook in his first free practice session at the Rome ePrix.

== Karting record ==
=== Karting career summary ===
Season	Series	Team	Position
2006	Kartmasters British Grand Prix — WTP Cadet		12th
2006	Bayford Kart Club Summer Sprint Championship — Honda Cadet		3rd
2006	Super 1 National Championship — Comer Cadet		4th
2008	Kartmasters British Grand Prix — Rotax Mini Max		14th
2008	Buckmore Park Summer Championship — Minimax	The Kart Shop	2nd
2009	Buckmore Park Summer Championship — Minimax	The Kart Shop	1st
2009	Super One Series ABkC Championship — MiniMax		13th
2010	Shenington Kart Club — Rotax Mini Max		9th
2010	Rotax Max Euro Challenge — Junior		2nd
2010	Rotax Max Challenge Grand Finals — Junior		16th
2010	Super 1 National Championship — Rotax Mini Max		3rd
2011	Trent Valley Kart Club — Senior Rotax		24th
2011	Trent Valley Kart Club — Junior Rotax		46th
2011	Shenington Kart Club — Rotax Mini Max		6th
2011	BNL Karting Series — Rotax Max Junior		2nd
2012	Rotax Max Euro Challenge — Senior		35th

== Racing record ==
=== Racing career summary ===
Season	Series	Team	Races	Wins	Poles	F/Laps	Podiums	Points	Position
2012	Intersteps Championship	Fortec Motorsports	23	2	2	3	13	490	**3rd**
2013	Formula Renault 2.0 NEC	Fortec Motorsports	16	0	1	1	5	230	**2nd**
2013	Eurocup Formula Renault 2.0	Fortec Motorsports	2	0	0	0	0	0	NC†
2013	Eurocup Formula Renault 2.0	Manor MP Motorsport	4	0	0	0	0	0	NC†
2014	Eurocup Formula Renault 2.0	Fortec Motorsports	14	1	1	0	4	86	7th
2014	Formula Renault 2.0 Alps	Fortec Motorsports	8	0	0	1	0	0	NC†
2014	Pro Mazda Championship	Team Pelfrey	2	0	0	0	0	31	20th
2015	Eurocup Formula Renault 2.0	Koiranen GP	17	5	4	3	6	206	**1st**
2015	Formula Renault 2.0 Alps	Koiranen GP	15	4	3	3	7	242	**1st**
2015	Pro Mazda Winterfest	Team Pelfrey	5	3	1	2	4	167	**1st**
2016	GP3 Series	Arden International	18	1	0	2	7	148	5th
2016	Euroformula Open Championship	RP Motorsport	4	2	2	1	3	71	8th
2016	Spanish Formula 3 Championship	RP Motorsport	2	1	1	1	1	27	7th
2016	Formula V8 3.5 Series	RP Motorsport	4	0	1	0	0	14	15th
2017	GP3 Series	ART Grand Prix	15	1	2	2	6	141	**2nd**
2018	FIA Formula 2 Championship	ART Grand Prix	23	1	0	0	2	63	11th
2018	Formula One	Renault Sport F1 Team	Test driver						
2019	FIA Formula 2 Championship	Campos Racing	22	3	0	2	7	159	5th
2019	Formula One	Renault F1 Team	Test driver						
2020	FIA Formula 2 Championship	Campos Racing	22	0	0	1	2	48	14th
2020	Formula One	Williams Racing	1	0	0	0	0	0	22nd
2021	FIA Formula 2 Championship	HWA Racelab	9	0	0	0	0	0	23rd
2021	GT World Challenge Europe Sprint Cup	Emil Frey Racing	6	0	0	1	0	17.5	19th
2021	GT World Challenge Europe Endurance Cup	Emil Frey Racing	4	0	0	0	0	8	24th
2021	Formula One	Williams Racing	Reserve driver						
2022	ADAC GT Masters	Emil Frey Racing	14	1	1	2	3	140	4th
2022	GT World Challenge Europe Endurance Cup	Emil Frey Racing	5	0	0	1	1	32	15th
2022	Intercontinental GT Challenge	Emil Frey Racing	1	0	0	0	0	0	NC
2022	European Le Mans Series - LMP2	Racing Team Turkey	5	0	0	0	0	30	11th
2022	24 Hours of Le Mans - LMP2	Algarve Pro Racing	1	0	0	0	0	N/A	20th
2022	Formula One	Williams Racing	Reserve driver						
2022–23	Formula E	Envision Racing	Test driver						
2023	Deutsche Tourenwagen Masters	Emil Frey Racing	14	1	1	1	2	82	14th
2023	IMSA SportsCar Championship - GTP	Whelen Engineering Racing	4	1	1	1	2	1263	10th
2023	FIA World Endurance Championship - Hypercar	Cadillac Racing	1	0	0	0	0	0	NC†
2023	24 Hours of Le Mans - Hypercar	Action Express Racing	1	0	0	0	0	0	10th
2023	Nürburgring Endurance Series - VT2-FWD	Walkenhorst Motorsport	1	1	0	0	1	0	NC†
2023–24	Formula E	Envision Racing	Test driver						
2024	IMSA SportsCar Championship - GTP	Whelen Cadillac Racing	9	0	4	1	3	2687	4th
2024	24 Hours of Le Mans - Hypercar	Whelen Cadillac Racing	1	0	0	0	0	N/A	15th
2024	Deutsche Tourenwagen Masters	Emil Frey Racing	16	3	4	0	3	128	8th
2024	Nürburgring Langstrecken-Serie - VT2-FWD	Walkenhorst Motorsport	1	0	0	0	0	*	*
2024	Nürburgring Langstrecken-Serie - BMW M240i	Smyrlis Racing	1	0	0	0	1	*	*
2025	IMSA SportsCar Championship - GTP	Cadillac Whelen	9	2	1	1	2	2720	**2nd**
2025	24 Hours of Le Mans - Hypercar	Cadillac Whelen	1	0	0	0	0	0	DNF
2025	Deutsche Tourenwagen Masters	Emil Frey Racing	16	2	3	3	4	162	8th
2026	IMSA SportsCar Championship - GTP	Cadillac Whelen	9	2	3	3	7	3020	**1st**
2026	FIA World Endurance Championship - Hypercar	Cadillac Hertz Team Jota	7	1	0	0	2	77	7th
2026	European Le Mans Series - LMP2	Nielsen Racing	1	0	0	0	0	12	16th

^{†} As Aitken was a guest driver, he was ineligible for championship points.

=== Complete Formula Renault 2.0 NEC results ===
(key) (Races in bold indicate pole position) (Races in italics indicate fastest lap)

Year	Entrant	1	2	3	4	5	6	7	8	9	10	11	12	13	14	15	16	17	Pos	Points
2013	Fortec Motorsports	HOC; 1; 5	HOC; 2 Ret	HOC; 3; 22	NÜR; 1; 8	NÜR; 2; 9	SIL; 1; 2	**SIL**; **2**; 2	SPA; 1; 3	SPA; 2; 20	ASS; 1; 2	ASS; 2; 4	MST; 1; 4	MST; 2; 3	MST; 3; 12	ZAN; 1; 5	ZAN; 2; 4	ZAN; 3 C	2nd	230

=== Complete Eurocup Formula Renault 2.0 results ===
(key) (Races in bold indicate pole position) (Races in italics indicate fastest lap)

Year	Entrant	1	2	3	4	5	6	7	8	9	10	11	12	13	14	15	16	17	Pos	Points
2013	Manor MP Motorsport	ALC; 1	ALC; 2	SPA; 1	SPA; 2	MSC; 1; 23	MSC; 2; 31							CAT; 1; 25	CAT; 2; 19				NC	0
2013	Fortec Motorsports							RBR; 1; 9	RBR; 2; 13	HUN; 1	HUN; 2	LEC; 1	LEC; 2						NC	0
2014	Fortec Motorsports	ALC; 1; 19	ALC; 2; 27	SPA; 1; 17	SPA; 2; 20	MSC; 1 Ret	MSC; 2; 12	NÜR; 1; 3	NÜR; 2; 6	HUN; 1; 18	**HUN**; **2**; 1	LEC; 1; 21	LEC; 2; 12	JER; 1; 2	JER; 2; 3				7th	86
2015	Koiranen GP	ALC; 1; 10	ALC; 2; 8	ALC; 3 Ret	SPA; 1 Ret	SPA; 2; 7	HUN; 1; 1	HUN; 2; 4	**SIL**; **1**; 1	**SIL**; **2**; 2	SIL; 3; 4	NÜR; 1; 1	NÜR; 2; 6	LMS; 1; 4	LMS; 2; 6	**JER**; **1**; 1	**JER**; **2**; 1	JER; 3; 16	1st	206

=== Complete Formula Renault 2.0 Alps results ===
(key) (Races in bold indicate pole position) (Races in italics indicate fastest lap)

Year	Entrant	1	2	3	4	5	6	7	8	9	10	11	12	13	14	15	16	Pos	Points
2014	Fortec Motorsports	IMO; 1; 4	IMO; 2; 4	PAU; 1	PAU; 2	RBR; 1	RBR; 2	SPA; 1	SPA; 2	MNZ; 1 Ret	MNZ; 2; 12	MUG; 1; 34	MUG; 2; 19	JER; 1; 7	JER; 2 Ret			NC†	0
2015	Koiranen GP	IMO; 1; 2	**IMO**; **2**; 1	PAU; 1; 8	PAU; 2; 6	**RBR**; **1**; 1	**RBR**; **2**; 1	RBR; 3; 13	SPA; 1; 4	SPA; 2; 4	MNZ; 1; 7	MNZ; 2 Ret	MNZ; 3 DNS	MIS; 1; 1	MIS; 2; 6	JER; 1; 2	JER; 2; 3	1st	242

† As Aitken was a guest driver, he was ineligible for points

=== Pro Mazda Championship ===
Year	Team	1	2	3	4	5	6	7	8	9	10	11	12	13	14	Rank	Points
2014	Team Pelfrey	STP	STP	BAR	BAR	IMS	IMS	LOR	HOU	HOU	MOH	MOH	MIL	SON; 9	SON; 4	20th	31

=== Complete Euroformula Open Championship results ===
(key) (Races in bold indicate pole position) (Races in italics indicate fastest lap)

Year	Entrant	1	2	3	4	5	6	7	8	9	10	11	12	13	14	15	16	Pos	Points
2016	RP Motorsport	EST; 1; 17	**EST**; **2**; 1	SPA; 1; 1	**SPA**; **2**; 2	LEC; 1	LEC; 2	SIL; 1	SIL; 2	RBR; 1	RBR; 2	MNZ; 1	MNZ; 2	JER; 1	JER; 2	CAT; 1	CAT; 2	8th	71

=== Complete GP3 Series results ===
(key) (Races in bold indicate pole position) (Races in italics indicate fastest lap)

Year	Entrant	1	2	3	4	5	6	7	8	9	10	11	12	13	14	15	16	17	18	Pos	Points
2016	Arden International	CAT; FEA; 20	CAT; SPR; 19	RBR; FEA; 9	RBR; SPR; 5	SIL; FEA; 13	SIL; SPR; 6	HUN; FEA; 9	HUN; SPR; 6	HOC; FEA; 6	HOC; SPR; 2	SPA; FEA; 5	SPA; SPR; 1	MNZ; FEA; 2	MNZ; SPR; 5	SEP; FEA; 2	SEP; SPR; 3	YMC; FEA; 3	YMC; SPR; 2	5th	148
2017	ART Grand Prix	**CAT**; **FEA**; Ret	CAT; SPR; 12	RBR; FEA; 2	RBR; SPR; 5	SIL; FEA; 4	SIL; SPR; 2	**HUN**; **FEA**; 1	HUN; SPR; Ret	SPA; FEA; 2	SPA; SPR; 18	MNZ; FEA; 2	MNZ; SPR; C	JER; FEA; 3	JER; SPR; 6	YMC; FEA; 14	YMC; SPR; 8			2nd	141

=== Complete Formula V8 3.5 Series results ===
(key) (Races in bold indicate pole position) (Races in italics indicate fastest lap)

Year	Team	1	2	3	4	5	6	7	8	9	10	11	12	13	14	15	16	17	18	Pos	Points
2016	RP Motorsport	ALC; 1	ALC; 2	HUN; 1	HUN; 2	SPA; 1	SPA; 2	LEC; 1	LEC; 2	SIL; 1	SIL; 2	RBR; 1	RBR; 2	MNZ; 1	MNZ; 2	**JER**; **1** DSQ	JER; 2; 4	CAT; 1; 11	CAT; 2; 9	15th	14

=== Complete FIA Formula 2 Championship results ===
(key) (Races in bold indicate pole position) (Races in italics indicate points for the fastest lap of top ten finishers)

Year	Entrant	1	2	3	4	5	6	7	8	9	10	11	12	13	14	15	16	17	18	19	20	21	22	23	24	DC	Points
2018	ART Grand Prix	BHR; FEA; 9	BHR; SPR; 18	BAK; FEA; 2	BAK; SPR; 11	CAT; FEA; 6	CAT; SPR; 1	MON; FEA; 7	MON; SPR; Ret	LEC; FEA; 11	LEC; SPR; DNS	RBR; FEA; Ret	RBR; SPR; 18	SIL; FEA; 13	SIL; SPR; 12	HUN; FEA; 4	HUN; SPR; 10	SPA; FEA; 11	SPA; SPR; 10	MNZ; FEA; 17†	MNZ; SPR; 8	SOC; FEA; 14	SOC; SPR; Ret	YMC; FEA; 10	YMC; SPR; 13	11th	63
2019	Campos Racing	BHR; FEA; 7	BHR; SPR; 11	BAK; FEA; 1	BAK; SPR; 3	CAT; FEA; 2	CAT; SPR; 8	MON; FEA; 17†	MON; SPR; 13	LEC; FEA; 3	LEC; SPR; 4	RBR; FEA; 10	RBR; SPR; 18	SIL; FEA; 5	SIL; SPR; 1	HUN; FEA; 3	HUN; SPR; 5	SPA; FEA; C	SPA; SPR; C	MNZ; FEA; 8	MNZ; SPR; 1	SOC; FEA; 7	SOC; SPR; 11	YMC; FEA; 11	YMC; SPR; 10	5th	159
2020	Campos Racing	RBR1; FEA; 15	RBR1; SPR; 8	RBR2; FEA; 9	RBR2; SPR; 6	HUN; FEA; 13	HUN; SPR; 19	SIL1; FEA; 13	SIL1; SPR; 8	SIL2; FEA; 3	SIL2; SPR; 3	CAT; FEA; 18†	CAT; SPR; 18	SPA; FEA; 13	SPA; SPR; 17	MNZ; FEA; 13	MNZ; SPR; 7	MUG; FEA; Ret	MUG; SPR; 13	SOC; FEA; 6	SOC; SPR; 4	BHR1; FEA; 10	BHR1; SPR; 17†	BHR2; FEA	BHR2; SPR	14th	48
2021	HWA Racelab	BHR; SP1	BHR; SP2	BHR; FEA	MON; SP1; 16	MON; SP2; 9	MON; FEA; 18	BAK; SP1; Ret	BAK; SP2; 12	BAK; FEA; 11	SIL; SP1; 17	SIL; SP2; 18	SIL; FEA; 17	MNZ; SP1	MNZ; SP2	MNZ; FEA	SOC; SP1	SOC; SP2	SOC; FEA	JED; SP1	JED; SP2	JED; FEA	YMC; SP1	YMC; SP2	YMC; FEA	23rd	0

^{†} Driver did not finish the race, but was classified as he completed over 90% of the race distance.
^{‡} Half points were awarded as less than 75% of the scheduled race distance was completed.

=== Complete Formula One results ===
Year	Entrant	Chassis	Engine	1	2	3	4	5	6	7	8	9	10	11	12	13	14	15	16	17	18	19	20	21	22	WDC	Points
2020	Williams Racing	Williams FW43	Mercedes F1 M11 EQ Performance 1.6 V6 t	AUT	STY; TD	HUN	GBR	70A	ESP	BEL	ITA	TUS	RUS	EIF	POR	EMI	TUR	BHR	SKH; 16	ABU						22nd	0
2021	Williams Racing	Williams FW43B	Mercedes M12 E Performance 1.6 V6 t	BHR	EMI	POR	ESP	MON	AZE	FRA	STY	AUT	GBR	HUN	BEL	NED	ITA	RUS	TUR	USA	MXC	SAP	QAT	SAU	ABU; TD	–	–

=== Complete GT World Challenge Europe results ===
==== GT World Challenge Europe Endurance Cup ====
(key) (Races in bold indicate pole position) (Races in italics indicate fastest lap)

Year	Team	Car	Class	1	2	3	4	5	6	7	Pos.	Points
2021	Emil Frey Racing	Lamborghini Huracán GT3 Evo	Pro	MNZ; Ret	LEC; 37	SPA; 6H; 55†	SPA; 12H; Ret	SPA; 24H; Ret	NÜR	CAT; 6	24th	8
2022	Emil Frey Racing	Lamborghini Huracán GT3 Evo	Pro	IMO; 13	LEC; 6	SPA; 6H; 40	SPA; 12H; Ret	SPA; 24H; Ret	HOC; 6	CAT; 3	15th	32

==== GT World Challenge Europe Sprint Cup ====
(key) (Races in bold indicate pole position) (Races in italics indicate fastest lap)

Year	Team	Car	Class	1	2	3	4	5	6	7	8	9	10	Pos.	Points
2021	Emil Frey Racing	Lamborghini Huracán GT3 Evo	Pro	MAG; 1; 12	MAG; 2; 9	ZAN; 1; 15	ZAN; 2; 4	MIS; 1; 7	MIS; 2; 5	BRH; 1	BRH; 2	VAL; 1	VAL; 2	19th	17.5

=== Complete ADAC GT Masters results ===
(key) (Races in bold indicate pole position) (Races in italics indicate fastest lap)

Year	Team	Car	1	2	3	4	5	6	7	8	9	10	11	12	13	14	DC	Points
2022	Emil Frey Racing	Lamborghini Huracán GT3 Evo	OSC; 1; 18	OSC; 2; 5	RBR; 1; 6	RBR; 2; 8	ZAN; 1; 12	**ZAN**; **2**; 1^{1}	NÜR; 1; 7	NÜR; 2; 16	LAU; 1; 2	LAU; 2; 2^{3}	SAC; 1; 11	SAC; 2; 7	HOC; 1; 4^{2}	HOC; 2 Ret	4th	140

=== Complete European Le Mans Series results ===
(key) (Races in bold indicate pole position; results in italics indicate fastest lap)

Year	Entrant	Chassis	Engine	Class	1	2	3	4	5	6	Rank	Points
2022	Racing Team Turkey	Oreca 07	Gibson GK428 4.2 L V8	LMP2	LEC; 8	IMO; 7	MNZ; 7	CAT; 10	SPA	**ALG**; 6	11th	30
2022	Racing Team Turkey	Oreca 07	Gibson GK428 4.2 L V8	Pro-Am Cup	1	1	2	4		1	2nd	105
2026	Nielsen Racing	Oreca 07	Gibson GK428 4.2 L V8	LMP2	CAT	LEC	IMO	SPA	SIL; 4	ALG	16th	12

=== Complete 24 Hours of Le Mans results ===
Year	Team	Co-Drivers	Car	Class	Laps	Pos.	Class Pos.
2022	(Portugal) Algarve Pro Racing	(Germany) Sophia Flörsch (United States) John Falb	Oreca 07-Gibson	LMP2	361	25th	20th
2022	(Portugal) Algarve Pro Racing	(Germany) Sophia Flörsch (United States) John Falb	Oreca 07-Gibson	LMP2 Pro-Am	361	25th	5th
2023	(United States) Action Express Racing	(Brazil) Pipo Derani (United Kingdom) Alexander Sims	Cadillac V-Series.R	Hypercar	324	17th	10th
2024	(United States) Whelen Cadillac Racing	(Brazil) Pipo Derani (Brazil) Felipe Drugovich	Cadillac V-Series.R	Hypercar	280	29th	15th
2025	(United States) Cadillac Whelen	(Brazil) Felipe Drugovich (Denmark) Frederik Vesti	Cadillac V-Series.R	Hypercar	247	DNF	DNF
2026	(United States) Cadillac Hertz Team Jota	(New Zealand) Earl Bamber (France) Sébastien Bourdais	Cadillac V-Series.R	Hypercar	218	DNF	DNF

=== Complete IMSA SportsCar Championship results ===
(key) (Races in bold indicate pole position) (Races in italics indicate fastest lap)

Year	Entrant	Class	Car	Engine	1	2	3	4	5	6	7	8	9	Rank	Points	Ref
2023	Whelen Engineering Racing	GTP	Cadillac V-Series.R	Cadillac LMC55R 5.5 L V8	DAY; 5	**SEB**; 1	LBH	LGA	WGL; 2	MOS	ELK	IMS	PET; 6	10th	1263	
2024	Whelen Engineering Racing	GTP	Cadillac V-Series.R	Cadillac LMC55R 5.5 L V8	**DAY**; 2	**SEB**; 10	**LBH**; 2	LGA; 2	DET; 6	WGL; 8	ELK; 4	IMS; 9	**PET**; 5	4th	2687	
2025	Cadillac Whelen	GTP	Cadillac V-Series.R	Cadillac LMC55R 5.5 L V8	DAY; 9	SEB; 4	LBH; 4	LGA; 6	DET; 10	WGL; 5	ELK; 4	**IMS**; 1	PET; 1	2nd	2720	
2026	Cadillac Whelen	GTP	Cadillac V-Series.R	Cadillac LMC55R 5.5 L V8	DAY; 2	**SEB**; 3	LBH; 2	LGA; 2	**DET**; 1	**WGL**; 1	ELK; 8	IMS; 2	PET; 7	1st	3020	

=== Complete Deutsche Tourenwagen Masters results ===
(key) (Races in bold indicate pole position) (Races in italics indicate fastest lap)

Year	Entrant	Chassis	1	2	3	4	5	6	7	8	9	10	11	12	13	14	15	16	Rank	Points
2023	Emil Frey Racing	Ferrari 296 GT3	OSC; 1; 3^{2}	OSC; 2; 17	ZAN; 1	ZAN; 2	NOR; 1; 17	NOR; 2; 20	NÜR; 1; 22	NÜR; 2; 18^{3}	**LAU**; **1**; 1^{1}	LAU; 2; 7	SAC; 1 Ret	SAC; 2 Ret^{2}	RBR; 1; 20	RBR; 2; 8^{3}	HOC; 1; 7	HOC; 2; 10	14th	82
2024	Emil Frey Racing	Ferrari 296 GT3	**OSC**; **1**; 1^{1}	OSC; 2 Ret^{3}	LAU; 1; 16	LAU; 2; 14	**ZAN**; **1**; 1^{1}	ZAN; 2; 16	**NOR**; **1**; 9^{1}	NOR; 2; 18	NÜR; 1; 5	NÜR; 2; 13	**SAC**; **1**; 1^{2}	SAC; 2; 6	RBR; 1; 14	RBR; 2; 10	HOC; 1 Ret	HOC; 2; 16	8th	128
2025	Emil Frey Racing	Ferrari 296 GT3	OSC; 1; 6	OSC; 2; 14	LAU; 1; 7	**LAU**; **2**; 1^{1}	ZAN; 1; 12	ZAN; 2; 4^{2}	NOR; 1; 5	NOR; 2; 2^{2}	**NÜR**; **1**; 1^{1}	NÜR; 2; 16	SAC; 1; 3	**SAC**; **2**; 15^{1}	RBR; 1 Ret	RBR; 2; 20^{3}	HOC; 1; 6^{2}	HOC; 2 DSQ	8th	162

=== Complete FIA World Endurance Championship results ===
(key) (Races in bold indicate pole position) (Races in italics indicate fastest lap)

Year	Entrant	Class	Chassis	Engine	1	2	3	4	5	6	7	8	Rank	Points
2023	Cadillac Racing	Hypercar	Cadillac V-Series.R	Cadillac LMC55R 5.5 L V8	SEB	ALG	SPA; Ret	LMS	MNZ	FUJ	BHR		NC‡	0‡
2026	Cadillac Hertz Team Jota	Hypercar	Cadillac V-Series.R	Cadillac LMC55R 5.5 L V8	IMO	SPA; Ret	LMS; Ret	SÃO; 4	COA; 2	FUJ; 5	CAT; 4	MNZ; 1	7th	77

‡ As Aitken was a guest driver, he was ineligible for championship points.

Sporting positions
Preceded by Spencer Pigot	Pro Mazda Winterfest; Champion; 2015	Succeeded by None (Series ended)
Preceded by Nyck de Vries	Formula Renault 2.0 Alps; Champion; 2015	Succeeded by None (Series ended)
Preceded by Nyck de Vries	Eurocup Formula Renault 2.0; Champion; 2015	Succeeded by Lando Norris
Preceded by Tom Blomqvist; Oliver Jarvis	Michelin Endurance Cup; Champion; 2023; With: Pipo Derani & Alexander Sims	Succeeded by Felipe Nasr; Dane Cameron
Preceded by Matt Campbell; Mathieu Jaminet	IMSA SportsCar Championship; Champion; 2026	Succeeded by Incumbent
