= Sonoma Raceway =

Motorsport track in the United States

- Grand Prix Layout (2001–present)

- Club Layout (2001–present)
- Location: 29355 Arnold Drive; Sonoma, California, United States; 95476
- Coordinates: 38°09′39″N 122°27′18″W
- Capacity: 44,000
- FIA Grade: 2
- Owner: Speedway Motorsports (November 1996–present)
- Broke ground: August 14, 1968; 58 years ago
- Opened: March 8, 1969; 57 years ago (dragstrip); March 28, 1969; 57 years ago (road course)
- Former names: Infineon Raceway (2002–2011); Sears Point Raceway (1993-2001); Sears Point International Raceway (1968–1979, 1981–1992); Golden State International Raceway (1980-1981)
- Major events: Current: NASCAR Cup Series; Toyota/Save Mart 350 (1989–2019, 2021–present); NASCAR O'Reilly Auto Parts Series; Sonoma 250 (2023–present); GT World Challenge America (1990–1993, 1995–1996, 2000–2001, 2003–2006, 2011–2017, 2019–present); Trans-Am Series (1969, 1978, 1981–1993, 1995, 2001, 2003–2004, 2022, 2025–present); Ferrari Challenge North America (1995–1997, 2003–2004, 2006–2016, 2021–present); NHRA Mission Foods Drag Racing Series; NHRA Sonoma Nationals (1988–2019, 2021–present); Former: NASCAR Truck Series; DoorDash 250 (1995–1998, 2022); FIA WTCC; Race of the United States (2012–2013); IndyCar Series; Indycar Grand Prix of Sonoma (1970, 2005–2018); Grand Prix of Sonoma (1976–1990, 1995–1997, 1999–2008); MotoAmerica (2017–2019); AMA Superbike Championship (1977–1979, 1982–1988, 1993–1999, 2001–2012); Can-Am Series (1977, 1980, 1984)
- Website: sonomaraceway.com

Long Circuit (2002–present)
- Surface: Asphalt
- Length: 2.520 mi (4.056 km)
- Turns: 12
- Race lap record: 1:22.041 ( (Germany) Marco Werner, Audi R8, 2005, LMP1)

IndyCar Circuit (2012–present)
- Surface: Asphalt
- Length: 2.385 mi (3.838 km)
- Turns: 12
- Race lap record: 1:18.3576 ( (France) Simon Pagenaud, Dallara DW12, 2017, IndyCar)

WTCC Circuit (2012–present)
- Surface: Asphalt
- Length: 2.505 mi (4.032 km)
- Turns: 12
- Race lap record: 1:27.691 ( (Netherlands) Daniël de Jong, Lola B05/52, 2012, Auto GP)

Club Circuit (2001–present)
- Surface: Asphalt
- Length: 1.990 mi (3.203 km)
- Turns: 12
- Race lap record: 1:13.629 ( (United States) Kyle Larson, Chevrolet Camaro ZL1, 2024, NASCAR)

Alternative Motorcycle Circuit (2008–present)
- Surface: Asphalt
- Length: 2.300 mi (3.701 km)
- Turns: 12
- Race lap record: 1:35.067 ( (United States) Cameron Beaubier, Yamaha YZF-R1, 2018, SBK)

IndyCar Circuit (2008–2011)
- Surface: Asphalt
- Length: 2.303 mi (3.706 km)
- Turns: 12
- Race lap record: 1:18.6320 ( (Brazil) Hélio Castroneves, Dallara IR-05, 2008, IndyCar)

IndyCar Circuit (2005–2007)
- Surface: Asphalt
- Length: 2.385 mi (3.838 km)
- Turns: 12
- Race lap record: 1:17.5524 ( (Brazil) Tony Kanaan, Dallara IR-05, 2007, IndyCar)

Long Circuit (1998–2001)
- Surface: Asphalt
- Length: 2.520 mi (4.056 km)
- Turns: 12
- Race lap record: 1:22.863 ( (United Kingdom) Allan McNish, Audi R8, 2000, LMP900)

Original Long Circuit (1968–1997)
- Surface: Asphalt
- Length: 2.523 mi (4.060 km)
- Turns: 12
- Race lap record: 1:25.057 ( (Australia) Geoff Brabham, Nissan NPT-90, 1990, IMSA GTP)

Sonoma Raceway (formerly known by various names, but commonly known as Sears Point and Infineon Raceway) is an auto racing complex in Sonoma, California, United States. The complex features multiple layouts, including various road course layouts and a drag strip. The facility has hosted various major events since its opening in 1969, including IndyCar, NASCAR, and NHRA events. Sonoma Raceway is owned by Speedway Motorsports, LLC (SMI) and led by track general manager Brian Flynn.

Originally opening in 1969, the track was built to be part of a large resort complex, but the plans were quickly abandoned. After the sale of the facility to film company Filmways within the year, it shortly thereafter fell into deep financial trouble. After three years of abandonment, numerous track operators attempted to reverse its financial troubles with little success until the start of the 1980s. In 1981, Jack Williams bought the track and was able to make the facility financially stable. The track's recovery continued under the leadership of Skip Berg, who took control of the facility in 1986, making several renovations. In 1996, Speedway Motorsports bought the facility from Berg and continued expanding it, primarily with a multi-year project in the early 2000s.

== Description ==
=== Layouts and configuration ===
An overhead photo of Sonoma Raceway (pictured in 2009).

Sonoma Raceway has multiple layouts. The main layout is measured at 2.520 mi (4.056 km) and has 12 turns. Its NASCAR layout, measured at 1.990 mi (3.203 km), bypasses turns five and six (known as the Carousel) and instead uses a straight-line section known as "the Chute", which connects turn 4A to turn 7A, both of which are turns exclusive to the NASCAR layout. The facility has a dragstrip which is measured at a 0.250 mi (0.402 km) long and is known for having an uphill gradient.

=== Amenities ===
Sonoma Raceway is located in Sonoma, California, and is served by California State Route 37 and California State Route 121. As of 2022, the track has a permanent seating capacity of 44,000 according to track owner Speedway Motorsports. (Note: "Speedway Motorsports Capabilities 2022" (PDF). Speedway Motorsports.) In total, the track complex covers approximately 1,600 acres (650 ha) of land according to KTXL.

== Track history ==
=== Early years ===
==== Planning and construction ====
On December 19, 1967, The Press Democrat reported that Sears Point Properties, Inc. filed a permit to build a 2.470 mi (3.975 km) road course near the Sears Point area. The corporation's investors consisted of four Marin County businessmen: James Coleman, John B. Gibbons, Robert D. Marshall, and Gordon Blumenfeld. The track was originally set to be the first phase of an entertainment complex named "Sears Point Park," according to the permit application. The Sonoma County Board of Zoning Adjustments approved the permit on December 21, with track executives stating hopes of hosting an inaugural Sports Car Club of America (SCCA) event on September 22, 1968. Additional plans for the track were released the following month, which included a projected budget of $1,200,000 (adjusted for inflation, $11,110,048) and track layouts for a 0.250 mi (0.402 km) drag strip and two road course layouts. Groundbreaking for the track was initially announced for March of that year; however, financing struggles in raising the $1.2 million budget delayed it by months. A new groundbreaking date for the now-named "Sears Point International Raceway" (SPIR) was announced and took place on August 14, 1968, with work commencing on the main road course and drag strip. A different road course layout was used than the initial plans released in December 1967.

In early September 1968, promoter Ken Clapp signed a long-term lease to host United States Auto Club (USAC) and NASCAR-sanctioned races at the facility. Paving for SPIR began on September 26 and was completed by October 4, with the complex having three road course layouts of 1.780 mi (2.865 km), 2.100 mi (3.380 km), and 2.500 mi (4.023 km), according to The Modesto Bee. Later that month, Clapp secured rights to host motorcycle races at SPIR, with the first event at the complex being scheduled for a National Hot Rod Association (NHRA) event in March 1969. SPIR held its first races on November 30, holding informal SCCA races that were closed off to spectators. Construction was slowed throughout the winter of 1968–69 due to storms, with Coleman, now general manager of the track, stating that "more than $100,000" worth of damages were incurred as a result of the storms. According to track designer Don Boos, construction costs "far exceeded" expectations. In addition, the final hairpin corner was altered in the final design; according to Boos, it was altered because the land where the corner was built was a former dairy farm. The dairy farm included a manure reservoir which was described as "an absolute stinking quagmire" by Boos, so the designers opted to alter the corner from Boos' plans.

==== Brief first opening, financial troubles, subsequent closure ====
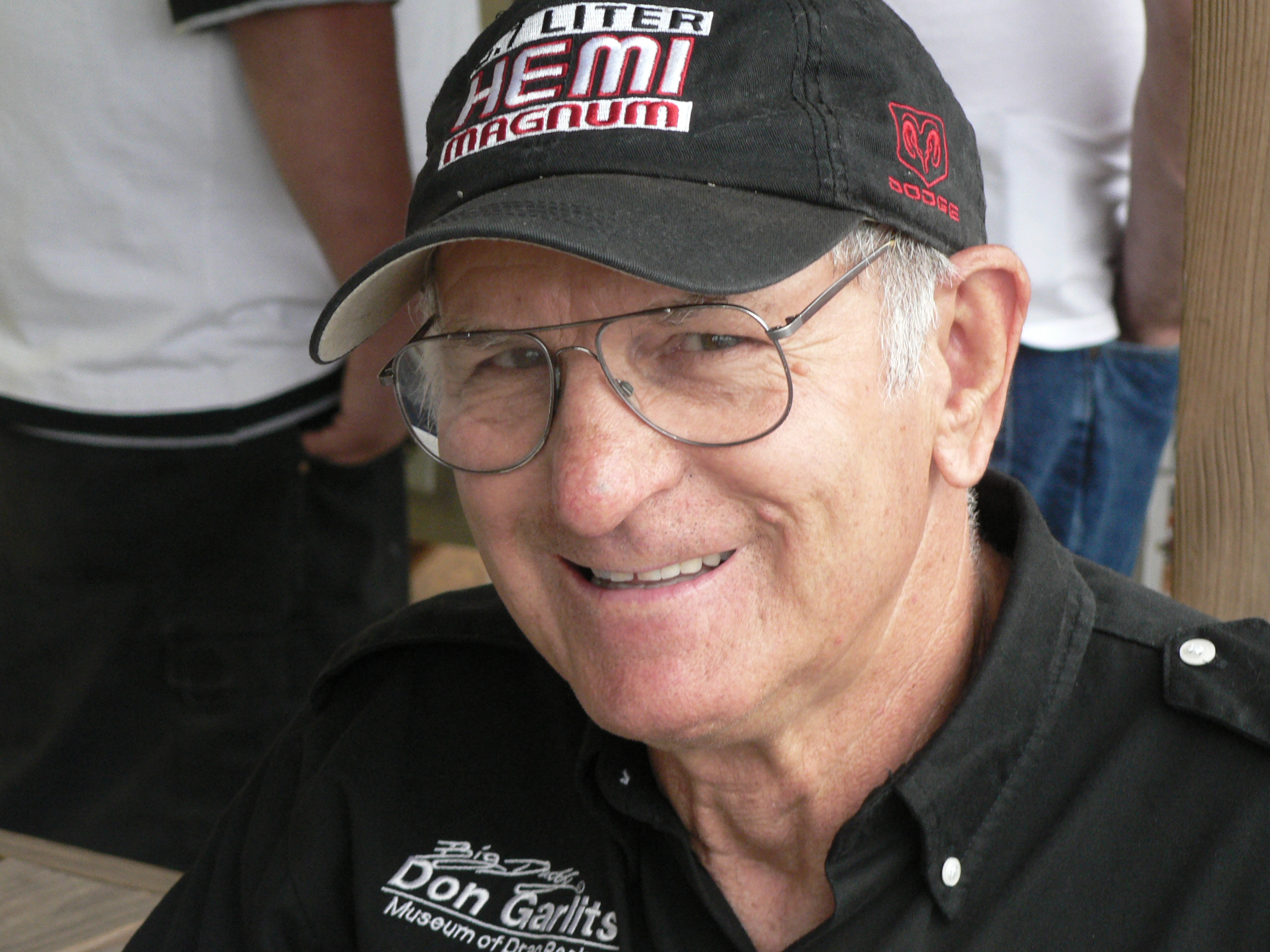
Don Garlits (pictured in 2007) won the first feature event at Sonoma Raceway. It was held in 1969 at the facility's dragstrip.

SPIR's dragstrip opened to the general public as scheduled on March 8 for an NHRA event, with Don Garlits winning the first feature event at the dragstrip a day later in the event's Top Fuel division. The venue received some criticism for heavy traffic and a lack of available parking; in response, two additional parking lots were opened to alleviate parking issues. The venue's road course formally opened later in the month on the 28th to host an SCCA event. In May of that year, negotiations began for film company Filmways to buy out SPIR, with Filmways finalizing its purchase two months later. SPIR held its first NASCAR-sanctioned race in June, with Ray Elder winning a Pacific Coast Division (now known as the ARCA Menards Series West) event. On September 7, the track experienced its first fatality after motorcycle rider Lee Patterson crashed in the main track layout's seventh turn, hitting a hay bale and dying instantly upon impact. The following year, SPIR hosted its first USAC Championship Car race, with Dan Gurney winning the event on April 4.

Soon after Filmways' purchase of SPIR, the facility fell into financial trouble due to high overhead expenses. In early May 1970, SPIR president Craig Murray talked to local media about the facility's financial decline, stating that the facility had lost $300,000 (adjusted for inflation, $2,487,147) within 14 months, undergone major staffing cuts, and that the stock price of the track had dropped from $35 to $8.25. Despite plans to host future scheduled races, on May 11, Filmways officially announced the cancellation of all Filmways-run events. The entire facility was put up for sale with an asking price set at between $3.5–4 million. After all offers to buy out the entirety of SPIR at the initial asking price fell through, the price was quickly dropped to $1.5–1.7 million for only the racetrack and its parking lots. After two one-off races run by the San Francisco Junior Chamber of Commerce, SPIR was closed for the rest of 1970 in August, with "no bright hopes" of a potential sale. By the end of October 1970, San Francisco Examiner reporter Miles Ottenheimer described the condition of SPIR as a "sad scene," writing that "nature is slowly taking over... peering through the wire gate at all this potential lying wasted, one is saddened. Only rabbits and occasional deer now venture out on the road course."

=== 1973 reopening, further financial troubles and government conflicts ===
In February 1971, Craig Murray stated an interest in potentially purchasing SPIR, planning meetings with NASCAR executives Bill France Jr. and Les Richter. Two months later, Murray announced in a press conference the formation of a corporation with drivers Dan Gurney, George Follmer, and Peter Revson that aimed to raise $1.5 million to purchase the facility. He further stated hopes to host motorcycle and drag races in 1972. An option to buy the facility was purchased by the group in August. In an effort to find other ways to generate revenue for SPIR, Murray announced in January 1972 plans to open the track daily to paying amateur drivers and spectators. However, the opening was delayed due to Securities and Exchange Commission (SEC) paperwork and a slow stock issue to raise $1,500,000 (adjusted for inflation, $11,545,346).

Starting in November 1972, Hugh Harn and Parker Archer were rumored as potential buyers for SPIR's lease, with the duo stating in the Daily Independent Journal their plans to focus on motorcycle racing. The duo's purchase was officially confirmed on January 1, 1973, for approximately $1,000,000, with the first races being scheduled for May of that year. SPIR officially reopened for an SCCA driving school on March 2, with the first sports car and motorcycle events since reopening occurring in the following months. Harn and Archer, soon after their purchase, were embattled with local environmental agencies, who refused to let the duo run major races until improvements to the track's water and sewage systems were made. Although some upgrades were made, by the time the duo tried to renew their racing license in 1974, Sonoma County officials had increased their requirements to host spectator events. After it was found that the track was near the Rodgers Creek Fault, Sonoma County refused to renew the track's license to host spectator races.

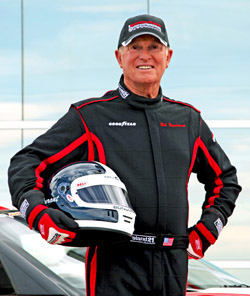
Bob Bondurant (pictured in 2012) managed and later owned Sonoma Raceway from 1974 to 1981.

In June 1974, Bob Bondurant, the owner of a driving school which was a tenant at SPIR, bought Harn and Archer's lease, making some renovations to the track's parking lot and water system by the end of July. However, within the first months of Bondurant's tenure, The Sacramento Union's Jack Woodard reported that as a result of continued financial issues and conflicts with local environmentalists, SPIR would "probably close forever next spring." Woodard further criticized the track's surface for being "not fit for any kind of racing at all," claiming, "construction goofs and years of neglect have resulted in a track that ranks somewhere between impossible and impassable." Bondurant denied the claims in late October, stating, "I'm going to sit down with [Woodard]... and have him do another article." In Woodard's follow-up article released on November 3, Bondurant admitted that although numerous renovations were needed, he did some minor renovations as a sign of "good faith" in hopes of getting Sonoma County officials to renew the track's annual license.

Conflicts between SPIR officials and SPIR owner Filmways continued into the mid-1970s, with Filmways refusing to invest in and expand the track as they were looking to sell the facility. After minor repairs were made to the track's surface in June 1975, Filmways approved $1 million in November to build a sewer treatment plant. By February 1976, SPIR President Lee Moselle stated that "considerable sums of money" had been spent on water and sewage facilities to comply with Sonoma County law. Three years later, Bondurant signed an agreement with Filmways to purchase the track in March. The purchase became official in June, with the Bondurant, Bill Koll, and Don Marsh-led Black Mountain Inc. paying $1.45 million.

==== Early fatalities ====
In the first few years after its reopening, SPIR oversaw numerous fatalities. On August 6, 1973, SPIR experienced its second death after Duane Gomez, son of Major League Baseball (MLB) pitcher Lefty Gomez, died after sustaining injuries in a motorcycle race. Three years later, motorcycle racer Edward Unini crashed into a track embankment and was killed after he was run over on July 18, 1976. On June 11, 1977, motorcycle trainee Candice Corbett died of "massive injuries to the left chest" after crashing at one of the track's turns. Two years after Corbett's death, Tim K. Kuykendall died in a Formula Ford race after his head hit a surrounding guardrail during a crash on August 11, 1979. Almost a year later, on August 10, 1980, Gary Lynn died after crashing into a deer that had jumped over a guardrail onto his path at the track's eighth turn.

=== Brief rebranding, Bondurant departure ===
A few months after Bondurant's purchase of SPIR, a fourth partner in Black Mountain, the Long Beach Grand Prix Association (LBGPA), joined the organization in January 1980. With the LBGPA joining, SPIR was rumored to undergo a rebranding to "Golden Gate Raceway"; the name change was confirmed in April. The rebranding lasted for a brief time. In March 1981, Bondurant resigned as president of the track due to disagreements over "management philosophies and goals" between himself and other members of management. Bondurant further blamed the LBGPA and its director, Chris Pook, claiming that Pook had not appeared at the facility in five months and that under his leadership, the track's public relations department had failed to maintain relationships with sponsors and sanctioning bodies after the departure of track director of operations, Art Glattke. In addition, several major events were canceled due to disputes with sanctioning bodies.

In March 1981, the owners filed a lawsuit against Filmways for "alleged misrepresentations of the June 1979 sale" in an effort to stop foreclosure proceedings after they stopped making mortgage payments to Filmways, stating that the track's actual revenue was less than what Filmways had agreed to in their contract. According to the owners' spokesman, Matthew Hudson, stopping mortgage payments "was part of a plan... to get Filmways' attention." A Sonoma County Superior Court judge ruled in favor of Filmways in May, leading Filmways to put the track up for sale soon after. On June 5, a group led by former director of track operations Jack Williams announced plans to buy the track; their purchase was officially confirmed on the 23rd, buying the track for approximately $800,000. With the purchase, the track reverted back to the original SPIR name.

=== Financial recovery, Jack Williams and Skip Berg eras ===
By September 1981, SPIR was able to host races with attendances nearing 20,000, which Williams attributed to an increased emphasis on advertising. In addition, Williams announced potential plans to build a 0.375 mi (0.604 km) dirt oval at the facility. The track was able to regain several major events by the 1982 season, with Novato Advance writer Rick Lalor stating that "Williams and company... have reversed the fortunes of the facility." In March 1983, Press Democrat writer Ralph Leef stated that with an expanded schedule of major events and financial stabilization, Williams and his group had "taken the motorsports complex out of the junk heap and turned it, once again, into a smooth-running machine." The following year, a pedestrian bridge was built at the first turn, with further plans made to build an additional bridge at the track's carousel turn in 1985.

In February 1984, The Press Democrat published rumors about a potential investor change, with an unspecified "major financial backer" funding upgrades and investor Rick Betts leaving the track ownership group. Seven months later, the rumor was confirmed, with real estate management firm president Skip Berg and financial services company president Frank Scott Jr. investing to help fund a track upgrade project that would take place from 1985 to 1987. In January 1985, a fundraising campaign for $650,000 (adjusted for inflation, $1,945,777) was initiated to fund a complete repaving of the track; the repave was started and completed in February of that year. By the end of the year, the paddock area was resurfaced alongside the construction of permanent garage facilities, five bridges, and additional permanent seating. In 1986, plans commenced for the construction of several amenities, including a souvenir store, garage areas, and 30 cabanas for VIP guests.

==== Skip Berg takeover, NASCAR Cup Series debut ====
On April 24, 1986, Williams was ousted as owner of SPIR by Skip Berg in a buyout, with Berg entering negotiations with Road Atlanta's ownership team for them to manage the track. Williams filed a lawsuit that same month to challenge Berg's ownership; it was settled out of court in August, with Berg retaining control. Berg initially hired Linda Finch as the track's general manager; however, she was fired four months after her hiring, which led to Finch filing a wrongful dismissal lawsuit against Berg that she eventually won in 1991. In December, Berg hired Darwin Doll, who was previously the general manager for the Michigan International Speedway, as general manager for SPIR. At approximately the same time, the impending sale and the subsequent planned closing and demolition of Southern California-based track Riverside International Raceway led NASCAR to consider replacing its national touring Cup Series race in Riverside with SPIR. Although NASCAR president Bill France Jr. stated in May 1986 that he thought the track needed "many things" and upgrades to obtain a Cup Series date, by the following year, Berg claimed in the San Francisco Examiner that France Jr. was seeking to host a Cup Series race at the facility as early as 1988. In addition, he noted that "for all practical purposes, you're looking at a new racetrack" due to the track's leadership changes. In addition, Berg attempted to improve relations and traffic flow after complaints from local businesses; the results garnered mixed reactions from business owners.

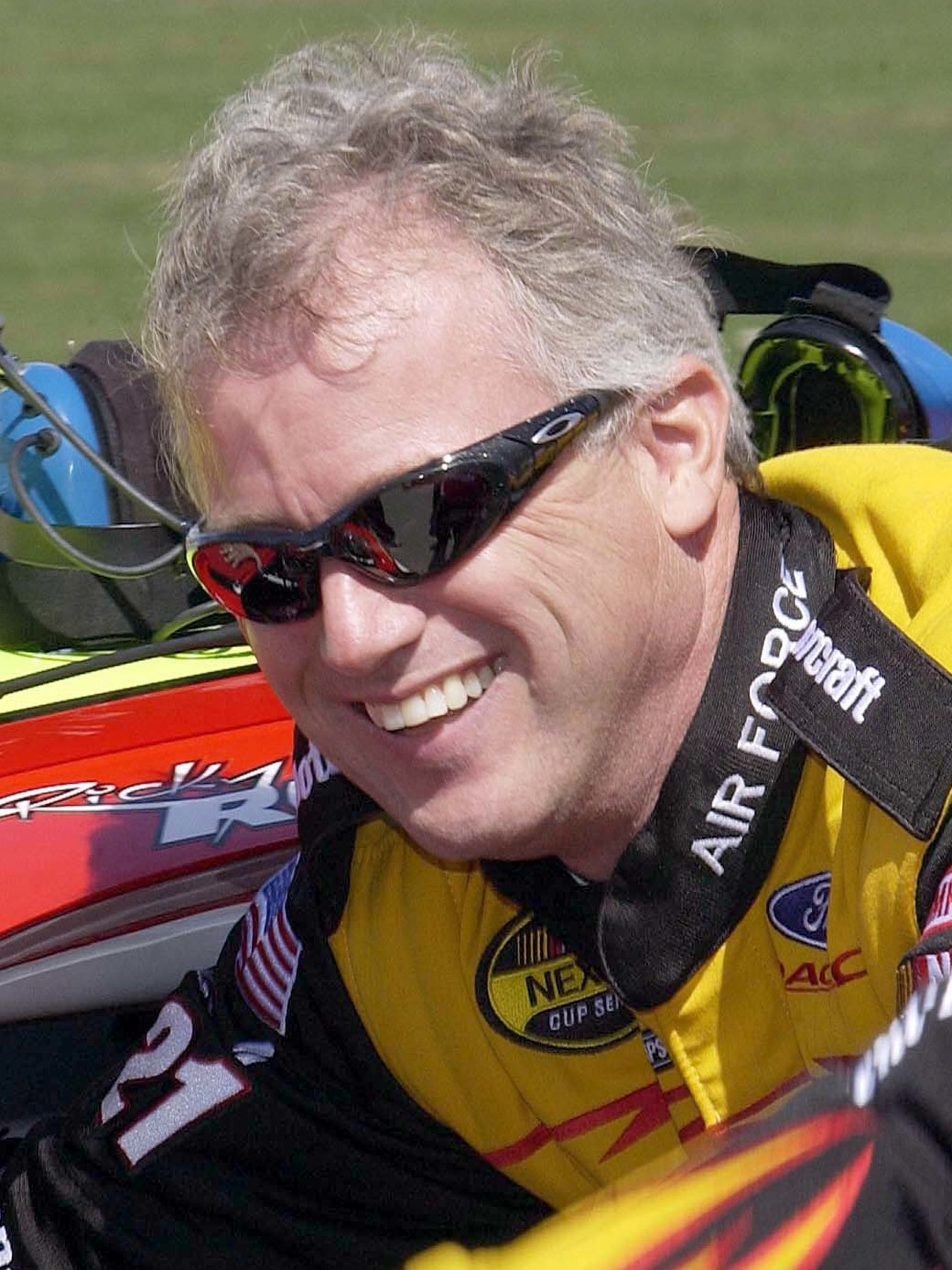
Ricky Rudd (pictured in 2005) won the first NASCAR Cup Series race held at the facility.

Doll's tenure as general was short, leaving on August 1, 1988, to become the general manager of a planned racetrack in Albuquerque, New Mexico. In June, Berg hired IBM executive Glen Long to replace Doll, who brought in an entirely new management team. In December, NASCAR officially announced the debut of the Cup Series at SPIR, scheduling a race for June 11, 1989. The race replaced one of Riverside International Raceway's Cup Series dates, as the track was permanently closed in 1988. To accommodate an influx of fans, temporary grandstands from the Formula One-sanctioned United States Grand Prix at the Phoenix Street Circuit were brought into SPIR. The race ran as scheduled, with Ricky Rudd winning in front of a crowd of 53,000. Long resigned as track president in August 1991 to join a sports marketing agency based in Atlanta, with Oakland Athletics marketing executive Steve Page hired as Long's replacement during the following month. Upon Page's hiring, he stated hopes in The Press Democrat to construct several track improvements, including additional garage stalls and an additional pedestrian tunnel built to separate the track's parking lot from the track. In 1993, the track's name was changed to "Sears Point Raceway," removing "International" from its name.

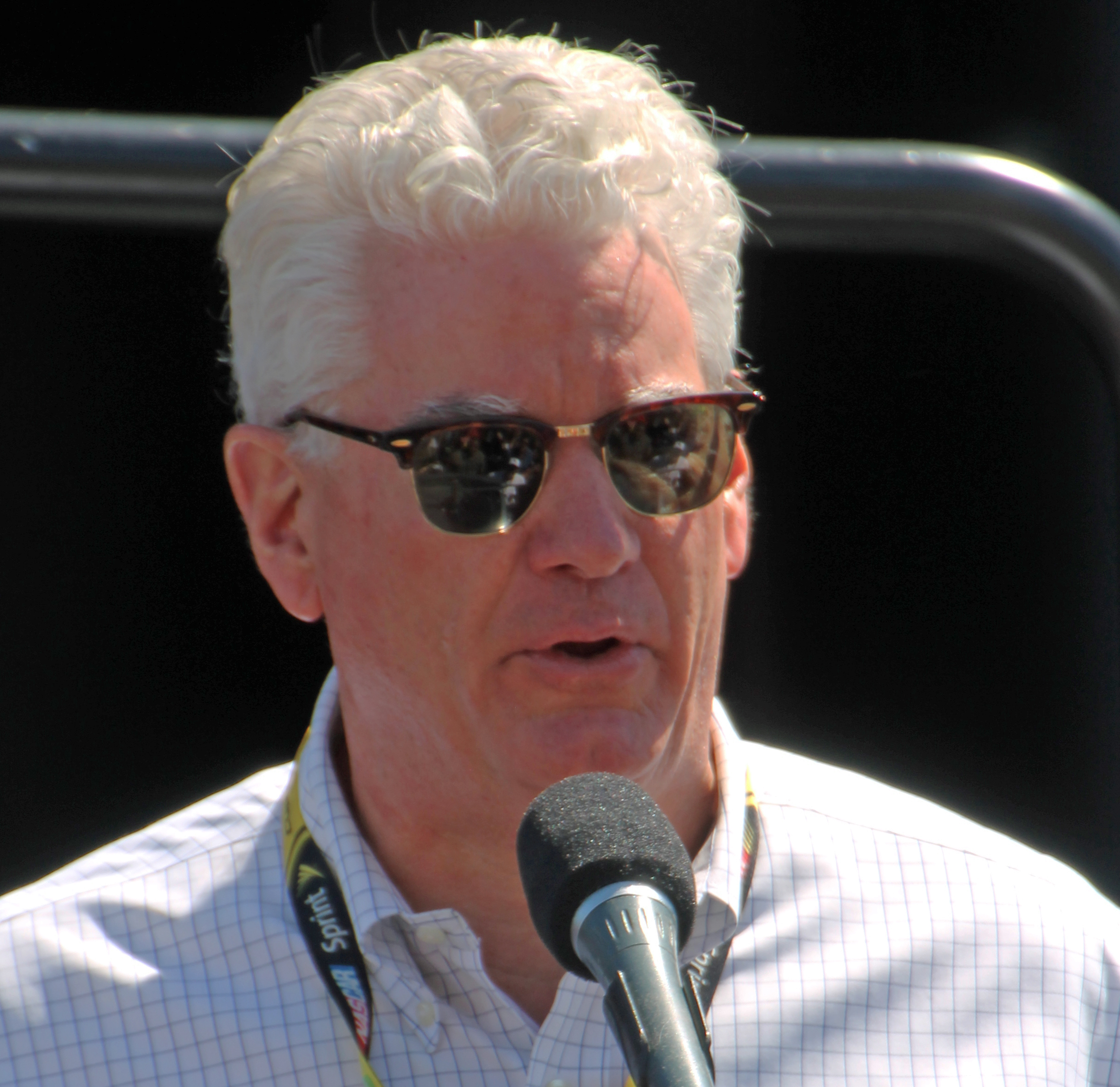
Steve Page (pictured in 2015) was general manager of Sonoma Raceway from 1991 to 2020.

Starting in 1993, a series of renovations began. That year, new grandstands were installed along the track's esses section. At the start of 1994, work began on a $1 million (adjusted for inflation, $2,172,205) beautification project focused on renovating the track's leaderboard, constructing a medical facility, and creating a lawn area at the track's second turn, which was completed in June of that year. Around this time, track officials began drafting plans to build a 1.000 mi (1.609 km) auto racing oval track as a complement to the facility's road course. In October of the same year, construction began on a VIP suite and control tower at the beginning of the track's dragstrip, a drivers' lounge, and a medical center; the project was completed by May 1995.

==== 1980s and 1990s fatalities ====
SPIR experienced numerous fatalities in the 1980s and 1990s. On August 14, 1983, Bradley Horrell was killed in a crash during an American Federation of Motorcyclists (AFM)-sanctioned race. Two cyclists were killed in 1985: Michael J. Parkinson on May 19 and Michael Guerrero on June 9. Parkinson crashed during an American Motorcyclist Association (AMA) race, and Guerrero crashed during an AFM race. In addition, sports car driver Jim Cook died on August 3 after suffering a heart attack during a qualifying lap, crashing at the track's first turn. Two years later, cyclist Mario Manucal was killed during an AMA race in September after crashing into a retaining wall and suffering head and chest injuries. On August 31, 1988, cyclist Russell Paulk died during a practice session for an AMA race after crashing into the retaining wall at the track's eighth turn, dying from multiple trauma. A year later, sailor Tom Blackaller died after suffering a heart attack during a practice session for a Sports 2000 race on September 7.

On March 8, 1990, Melvin Egan died at the end of a Sports Car Club of America (SCCA) race after suffering a heart attack and subsequently crashing at the track's first turn after he finished the race. Four years later, drag racer Ronald E. Dees was killed after crashing during a solo run at the track's drag strip on January 15, dying from severe head injuries. Four deaths occurred in 1997. On June 28, motorcyclist Joshua Scott died after crashing during a practice session for a motorcycle race. Around a month after Scott's death, drag racer Carrie Neal died after crashing during a trial run due to a stuck throttle on July 25, sustaining head injuries. On September 14, sports car racer Derek Israel died after crashing into another car at the track's eighth turn. A month after Israel's death, Brian Craig Wilson died on October 24 after crashing a Formula Mazda car into a track barrier.

=== Speedway Motorsports era ===
On November 11, 1996, the Winston-Salem Journal's Mike Mulhurn published rumors about a potential sale of the facility to motorsports businessman and Speedway Motorsports, Inc. (SMI) owner Bruton Smith. The purchase was confirmed two days later during a press conference, with the purchase price later revealed to be $2 million for the track along with an option to purchase the entire 800-acre (320 ha) facility for $38 million according to Securities and Exchange Commission (SEC) documents. With his purchase, Smith announced plans to heavily renovate the track, including increasing runoff areas, constructing more grandstand areas, and a dual media/VIP building. Smith also denied rumors published by the San Francisco Chronicle's Kenneth Howe about converting the road course into an oval. Some renovations were revealed in April 1997, including the widening of California State Route 121 to reduce traffic and the removal of several dirt mounds around the facility to improve fan visibility. Further renovations were planned soon after, including the construction of permanent grandstand seats at select turns and the start-finish line to increase permanent seating to 40,000, an underground pedestrian tunnel to replace overhead bridges, and several buildings for "keeping with a wine-country theme." However, the renovations were dependent on an environmental report, which delayed its planned completion until 1999.

In October 1997, plans were announced to create "The Chute," a section of the track connecting turns four and seven while bypassing turns five and six, known as "the Carousel," which would be used for NASCAR races. According to Page in a 1999 interview, the Chute was constructed to install more grandstands as track developers could not build a permanent grandstand at the Carousel. The Chute was completed and tested in May 1998 and received initial mixed feedback from drivers due to doubts about the section reducing the track's competitiveness and passing opportunities. The Chute was further modified the following year, which turned Turn Seven, originally a "medium-speed, sweeping" turn, into a "hard-braking 90-degree turn" in an effort to provide drivers a passing opportunity on the NASCAR layout. The layout received negative reviews in May 1999 from testers Rusty Wallace and Wally Dallenbach Jr. over doubts about the effectiveness of the corner's ability to be a passing opportunity.

==== Expansion delays, eventual approval ====
The environmental review needed to expand amenities at the facility was delayed multiple times. In July 1998, the Sonoma Valley Citizens Advisory Commission recommended that the Sonoma County Board of Zoning Adjustments reject the proposed $30 million expansion over noise, traffic, and environmental concerns. Original plans included building a mile-long, 110 ft (34 m) tall grandstand that could seat over 100,000. In addition, a group named the "Yellow Flag Alliance" was created to oppose the project. They threatened to pursue actions to shut down the track in August due to claims of noise-level violations. In response to citizens' concerns, track developers decreased permanent seating expansion from 110,000 to 44,500 seats. By December 1999, plans were downsized further to 35,000 permanent seats, with the grandstand's height shortened to 70 ft (21 m). The plan was approved by the Sonoma County Planning Commission in February, endorsed by the Sonoma County Board of Supervisors in March, and approved by the board in April. Work began on the now-$35 million project in May despite a last-ditch attempt by the Yellow Flag Alliance to file a lawsuit to stop construction, with 2,000 terrace seats being constructed at the track's fourth turn in time for the 2000 Save Mart/Kragen 350.

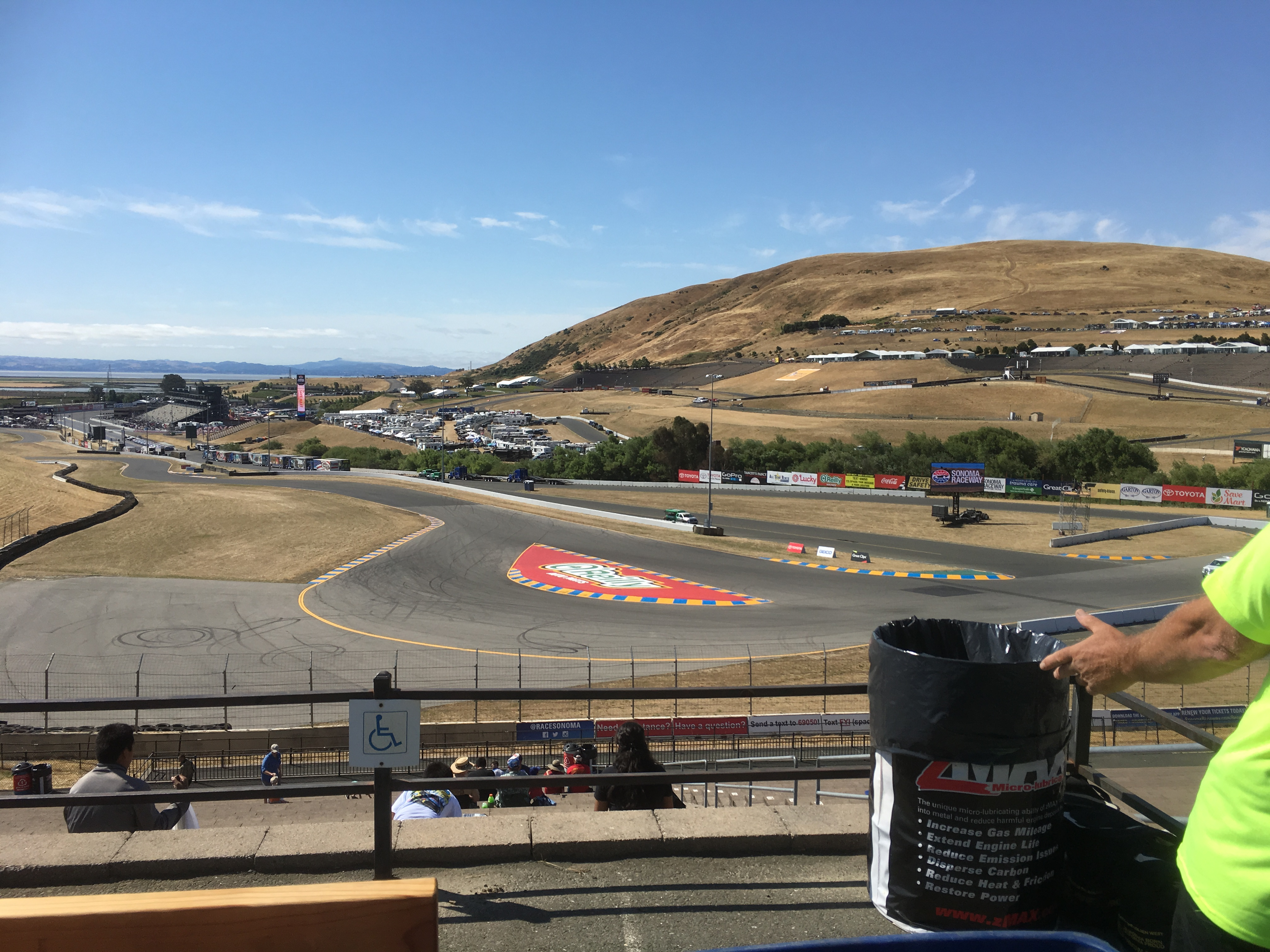
Sonoma Raceway's Turn 7A, part of "the Chute" (pictured in 2017). The corner was modified to its current form in 2001 after the original Chute received complaints from drivers due to a lack of passing opportunities.

An official groundbreaking ceremony for the project occurred in September. The expansion was split into two phases, with the first phase focusing on constructing the permanent grandstands, increasing run-off areas at select turns, a renovated garage area, and other renovations for fan amenities. The first phase of the project was completed in time for the 2001 Dodge/Save Mart 350. In addition, track developers announced planned modifications to "the Chute." The fourth turn for the NASCAR layout was turned into a "70-degree" turn, with the Chute straightaway being lengthened by 100 ft (30 m), which led into a new seventh turn for the NASCAR layout. Construction on the new Chute started in March and was completed the following month. The new Chute received a positive reception from testers Rusty Wallace, Matt Kenseth, and Chuck Billington. Work began on the second phase of the project in August, which included plans to build a specialized go-kart track, the construction of grandstands at turn seven and the start-finish line, a complete repave of the track, the separation of the track's road course and dragstrip, a concrete pad for the dragstrip, and the expansion of the track's pit road to accommodate 43 cars. The last of these was made to remove the need for a temporary pit road inside the Turn 11 hairpin, nicknamed "Gilligan's Island," which had been reserved for qualifiers in the final few spots of the field and had existed since 1994. The go-kart track, named the Karting Center, opened in March 2002. The second phase of the project was completed by July of that year. At the time of its completion, the project had cost $50 million. The project increased the number of permanent grandstand seats to approximately 70,000, according to the Oakland Tribune.

==== Infineon Raceway rebranding ====
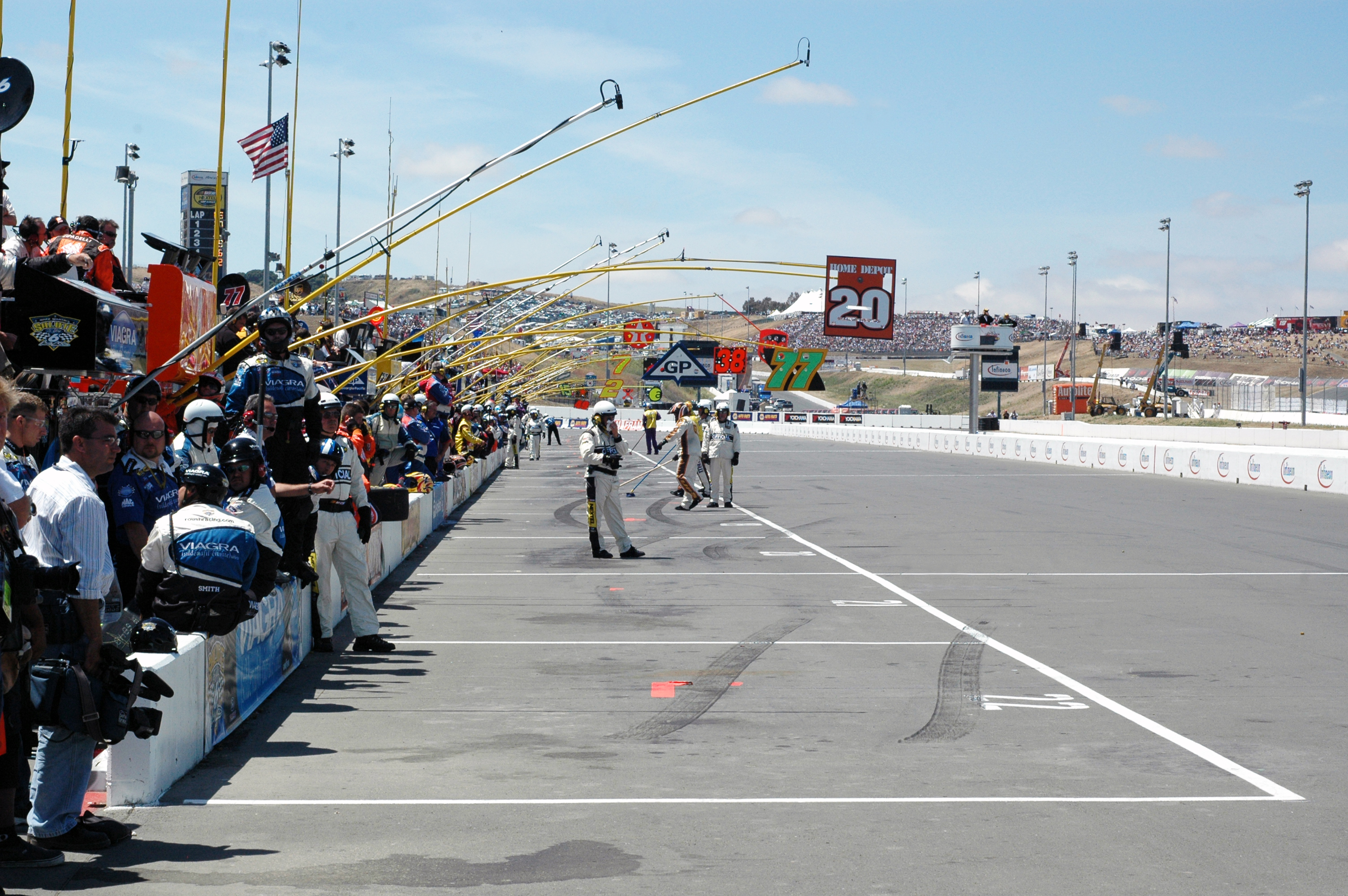
Infineon Raceway: Pit row, 2005

On June 22, 2002, Page announced the sale of the track's naming rights to semiconductor company Infineon Technologies, signing a 10-year, $35 million deal. As a result, the facility was renamed to "Infineon Raceway". In January 2003, work began on a new permanent layout to host races for the AMA Superbike Championship. Built for the purpose of creating a safer layout for the series to race on, the changes created "about a 90-degree turn" for the first turn, a bypass for the track's esses section that created a 900 ft (270 m) straightaway starting at turn 8A before leading onto a chicane, and a shortening of the turn 11 hairpin by 40 ft (12 m). The new layout was completed in March of that year. In August, several turns of the track were repaved and additional curbing was installed in select turns. In 2010, Page announced a project in collaboration with electronics company Panasonic to install 1,652 solar panels on the facility. The project, which cost approximately $3,000,000, was completed in June 2011.

==== Infineon departure, further renovations ====
In March 2012, SMI announced that Infineon Technologies would not renew their naming rights deal; according to Page, he had known the company was not going to renew "for three or four years" and that the reason was due to a management overhaul within Infineon. Although the track continued to seek a title sponsor, in June, the track was renamed to "Sonoma" as a temporary rebranding. Two months later, a new hairpin was added for the IndyCar race layout for that year's event, with straightaway leading up to the turn 11 hairpin being extended by 200 ft (61 m); with this change, the 11th turn had three layouts. A name change was made official in December, with the track being renamed to "Sonoma Raceway". According to Page, the decision on renaming the track to "Sonoma" rather than the former "Sears Point" moniker was that the name Sonoma represented "an international brand that connotes a lifestyle". In March 2015, the facility's dragstrip was fully repaved.

On August 27, 2020, Page announced his retirement as general manager of Sonoma Raceway effective on January 1, 2021, ending a 29-year reign. Page's replacement was announced in January 2021, with NASCAR's chief marketing and content officer Jill Gregory taking over the position. In June of that year, construction began on a luxury hospitality area at the track's 11th turn. The complex, named the Turn 11 Club, was completed in June 2022 in time for the 2022 Toyota/Save Mart 350. Gregory announced her resignation as general manager of the track on July 19, 2023, to start a marketing consultant firm, with Sonoma Raceway consultant Brian Flynn replacing Gregory on August 1. In December, work began on the first complete repave of the track in over 20 years; the repave was completed in February 2024. Two months later, parts of the repaved surface were reported to have came apart during a GT World Challenge America test, which were patched up before the 2024 Toyota/Save Mart 350 race weekend.

==== Modern-day fatalities ====
The track continued experiencing fatalities heading into the new millennium. Two motorcyclists died in 2000 due to crashes: Mark Anderson on January 8 and Tom Marino on November 3. On August 26, 2001, Formula Vee driver Tim Barlow died when he was involved in a multi-car incident after his car stalled on-track. On June 20, 2004, motorcyclist Rich Thorwaldson died after crashing during a club race on May 30, dying after spending three weeks in a coma. Nearly two months later, Jimm Groshong died in a crash at the track's ninth turn after he attempted to avoid a crashed rider on August 7. On August 11, 2006, motorcyclist Allen Rice died after crashing near the track's pit road exit due to a stuck throttle. On November 28, 2009, furniture store owner Larry Kurpieskwi died after suffering a heart attack during a go-kart race, crashing during the event. On May 15, 2010, motorcyclist Augustine Alves died in a crash at a temporary 0.250 mi (0.402 km) dirt track. Two deaths occurred in 2018. On March 28, drag racer James Rambo died in a crash at the facility's dragstrip, hitting a protective wall at "more than 100 mph (160 km/h)" during a Wednesday Night Drags event. Eight months later, Paul Martin Traver died in a go-kart accident on November 24 at the track's eighth turn, having been ejected 50 ft (15 m) in the crash due to Traver not wearing a seatbelt.

== Events and uses ==
=== Auto racing ===
==== NASCAR ====
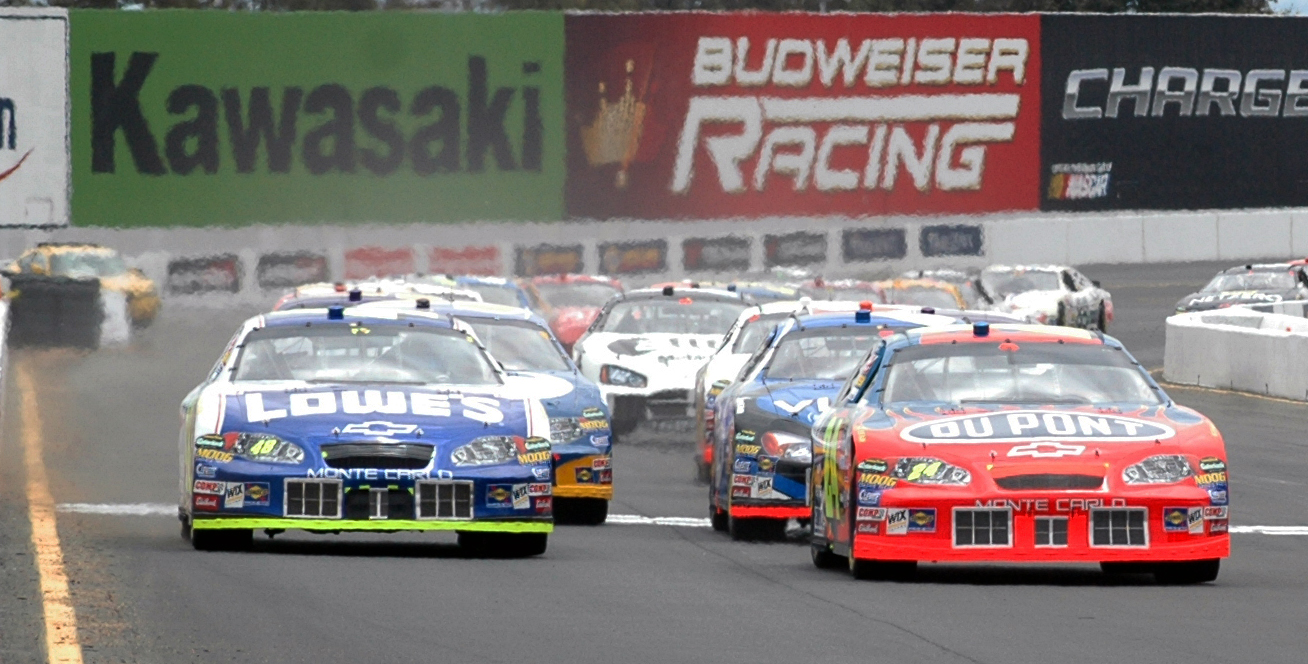
A photo of a NASCAR Cup Series race at Sonoma Raceway in 2005, taken at the track's start-finish line. Since 1989, the series has raced at the track annually.

NASCAR has held sanctioned races at Sonoma Raceway since 1969. The track has hosted one NASCAR Cup Series race annually at the facility since 1989 (with the exception of 2020 due to the COVID-19 pandemic), with a race currently known as the Toyota/Save Mart 350. In addition, the track hosts NASCAR O'Reilly Auto Parts Series (currently known as the Sonoma 250) and ARCA Menards Series West (currently known as the General Tire 200) races as support races for the Cup Series, with the latter having made appearances in most years since the track's opening in 1969.

==== Open-wheel racing ====
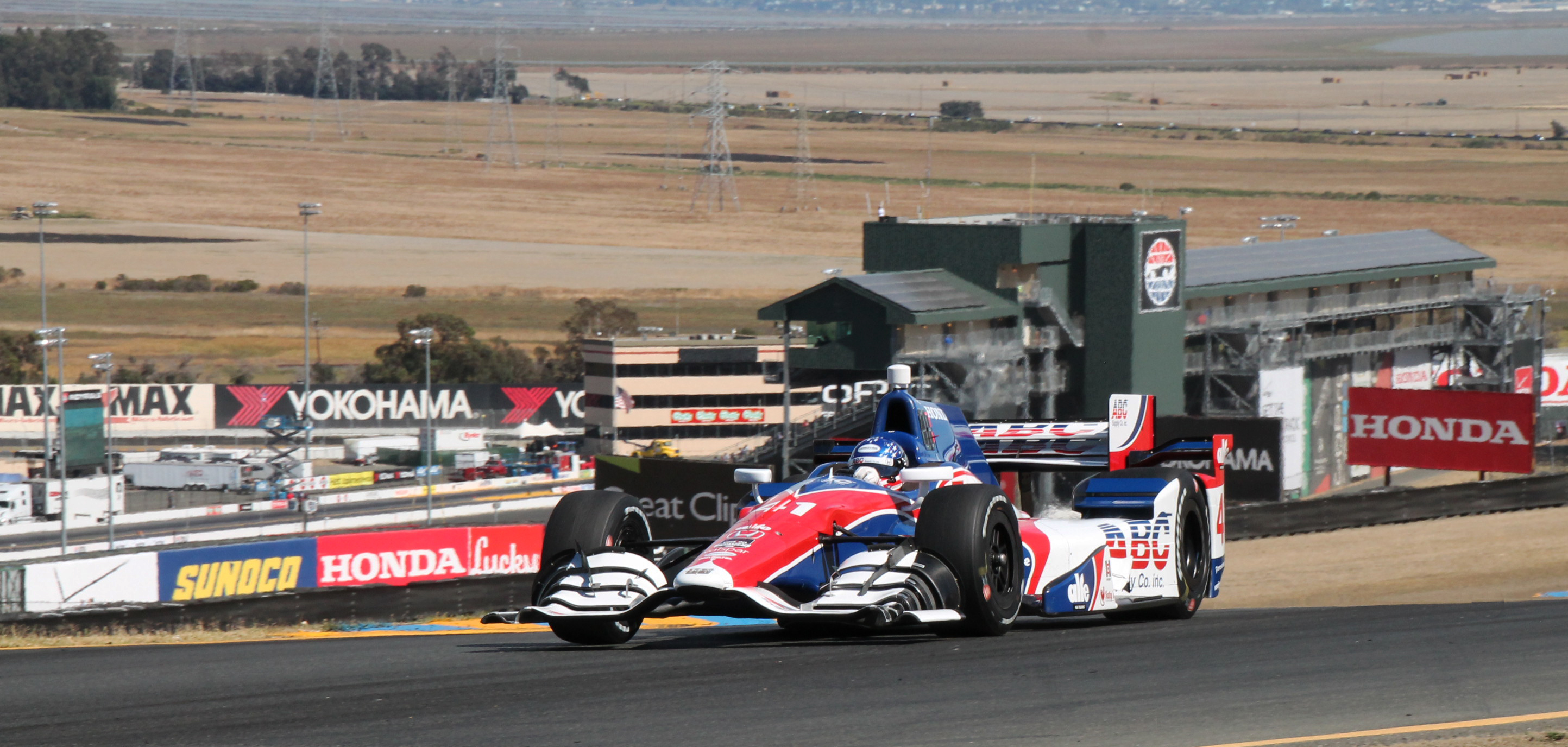
Jack Hawksworth at the 2015 GoPro Grand Prix of Sonoma. From 2005 until 2018, the IndyCar Series raced annually at Sonoma Raceway.

The IndyCar Series debuted at Sonoma Raceway in 2005, and raced annually at the facility until 2018, when it was replaced by Laguna Seca for the following year. From 2015 until 2018, the track's race was the final race of the season for the IndyCar Series. In addition, the United States Auto Club (USAC) sanctioned an open-wheel race at the facility on April 4, 1970 for the USAC Championship Car series.

==== NHRA ====
The National Hot Rod Association (NHRA) has held the NHRA Sonoma Nationals annually since 1988 (with the exception of 2020 due to the COVID-19 pandemic). Prior to 1988, the NHRA had sanctioned local races at the facility since 1969, with the 1969 San Francisco National Open being the first event in the facility's history.

==== Sports car racing ====
The Grand Prix of Sonoma, a sports car race, has been run under multiple sanctioning bodies. The IMSA GT Championship first ran the Grand Prix of Sonoma in 1976, running the event annually until 1990, when it was dropped for the following season. The series returned to Sonoma in 1995, running annually until 1997. In 1999, the American Le Mans Series (ALMS) starting sanctioning the Grand Prix of Sonoma, running it annually until 2005.

==== Other racing events ====
Sonoma Raceway has held a variety of racing series throughout its existence, including the 24 Hours of Lemons, the AMA Superbike Championship, Auto GP, the Can-Am Series, Ferrari Challenge North America, GT World Challenge America, the Rolex Sports Car Series, the Trans-Am Series, and the World Touring Car Championship.

=== Non-racing events and uses ===
==== Filming production ====
Sonoma Raceway was used for filming in the 1970 film Little Fauss and Big Halsy.

==== Unrealized events ====
In 1969, plans were announced to host a free rock music festival on December 6, which had an expected attendance of 300,000 and was marketed as the "Woodstock West". Shortly after the concert was announced and some preparations were made, the concert was cancelled the day before the concert after track vice president Ken Clapp called numerous agencies and track owner Filmways to plead the cancellation of the concert after Clapp saw a 13-year-old woman with a recently-born infant on track property. It was moved on short-notice to Altamont Speedway in what was eventually known as the Altamont Free Concert, which was infamous for its violent reputation and is regarded as a key moment in American counterculture history.

In February 2015, track leaders announced potential plans to host a four-day rock music festival, with hopes of hosting the inaugural event in 2017. However, two months after the initial announcement, plans for the festival were scrapped due to high costs and a long wait to obtain a permit to host music festivals according to then-track general manager Steve Page.

=== Event list ===
Current

- March: GT World Challenge America, GT America Series, GT4 America Series, TC America Series, McLaren Trophy America, National Auto Sport Association, Formula Car Challenge, 24 Hours of Lemons, Toyota Gazoo Racing Cup North America
- April: Trans-Am Series, Trans Am West Coast Championship, Sportscar Vintage Racing Association, Porsche Sprint Challenge North America, Formula Car Challenge, Radical Cup North America
- May: National Auto Sport Association, Porsche Sprint Challenge USA West, Velocity Invitational
- June: NASCAR Cup Series Toyota/Save Mart 350, NASCAR O'Reilly Auto Parts Series Sonoma 250, ARCA Menards Series West General Tire 200
- July: NHRA Mission Foods Drag Racing Series Denso NHRA Sonoma Nationals, Ferrari Challenge North America, National Auto Sport Association
- September: Formula Car Challenge, Sports Car Club of America
- November: National Auto Sport Association
- December: 24 Hours of Lemons

Former

- AMA Superbike Championship (1977–1979, 1982–1988, 1993–1999, 2001–2012)
- American Le Mans Series
  - Grand Prix of Sonoma (1999–2005)
- Auto GP (2012)
- Barber Pro Series (1987–1990, 1995–1996)
- Can Am Series (1977, 1980, 1984)
- Formula D (2004–2010)
- IMSA GT Championship
  - California Grand Prix (1976–1990, 1995–1997)
- IMSA GT3 Cup Challenge (2017–2018)
- IndyCar Series
  - Indycar Grand Prix of Sonoma (2005–2018)
- Indy Lights (2005–2010, 2014)
- Mazdaspeed Miata Cup (2005)
- MotoAmerica (2017–2019)
- NASCAR Camping World Truck Series
  - DoorDash 250 (1995–1998, 2022)
- NASCAR Southwest Series (1987–2005)
- Rolex Sports Car Series
  - Armed Forces 250 (2006–2008)
- SCCA Continental Championship (1969–1970)
- SCCA National Championship Runoffs (2018)
- Star Mazda Championship (1999–2005, 2011, 2014)
- USAC Championship Car Series (1970)
- U.S. F2000 National Championship (2004, 2014)
- World Touring Car Championship
  - FIA WTCC Race of the United States (2012–2013)

== Layout configurations ==
Sonoma Raceway layout configurations
Club Circuit (2001–present)

Long Circuit (2002–present)

IndyCar Circuit (2005–2007)

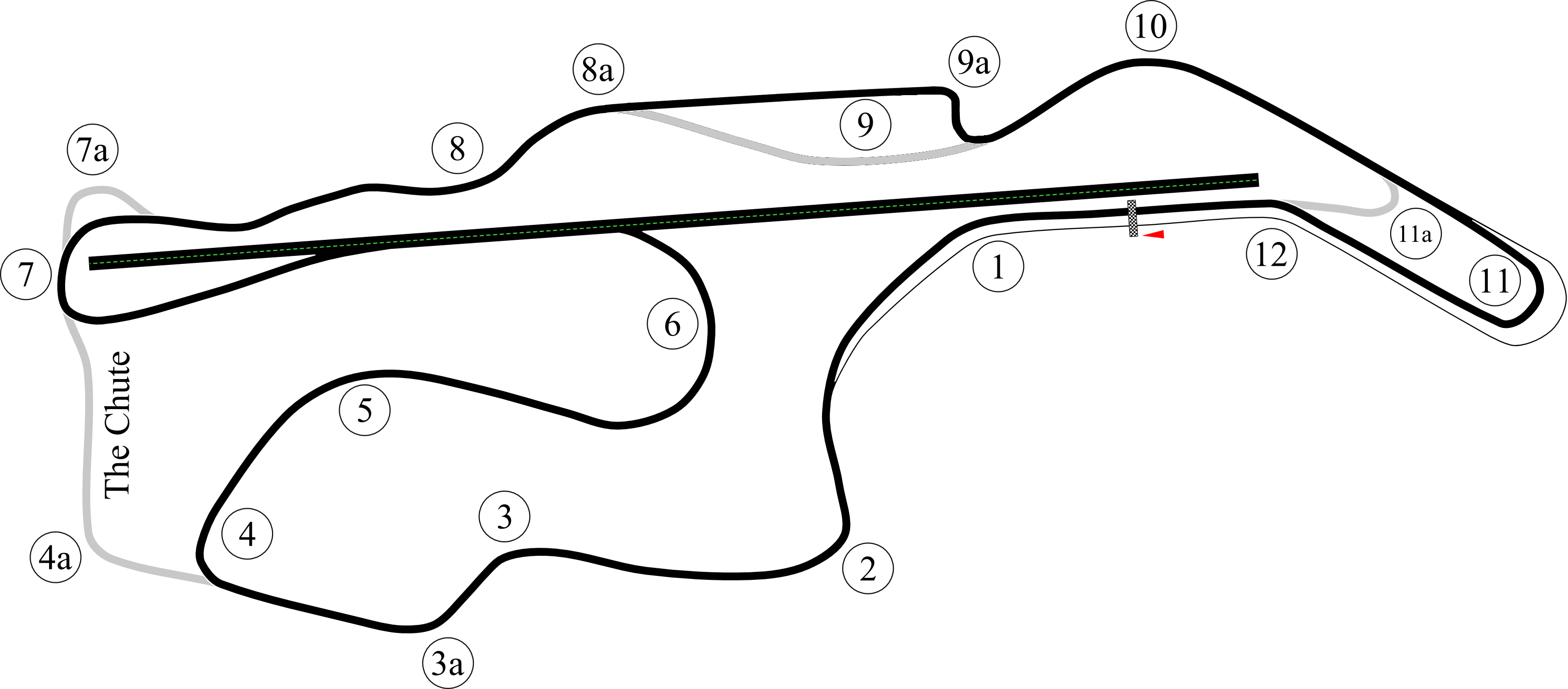
WTCC Circuit (2012–present)

IndyCar Circuit (2012–present)

== Race lap records ==
As of July 2026, the fastest official race lap records at Sonoma Raceway for different classes are listed as:

Category	Time	Driver	Vehicle	Event
Grand Prix Circuit (2002–present): 4.056 km (2.520 mi)
LMP1	1:22.041	Marco Werner	Audi R8	2005 Grand Prix of Sonoma
LMP675	1:24.229	James Weaver	MG-Lola EX257	2003 Grand Prix of Sonoma
LMP2	1:26.349	Clint Field	Lola B05/40	2005 Grand Prix of Sonoma
Daytona Prototype	1:27.051	Max Angelelli	Dallara DP01	2008 Armed Forces 250
TA1	1:28.776	Matthew Brabham	Ford Mustang Trans-Am	2026 Sonoma Trans-Am round
GT1 (GTS)	1:28.934	Oliver Gavin	Chevrolet Corvette C6.R	2005 Grand Prix of Sonoma
Ferrari Challenge	1:29.861	Johnny Kaminskey	Ferrari 296 Challenge	2026 Sonoma Ferrari Challenge North America round
TA2	1:33.750	Helio Meza	Chevrolet Camaro Trans-Am	2026 Sonoma Trans-Am round
GT2	1:35.112	Timo Bernhard	Porsche 911 (996) GT3-RSR	2005 Grand Prix of Sonoma
GT3	1:37.099	Daniel Morad	Mercedes-AMG GT3 Evo	2023 Sonoma GT World Challenge America round
NASCAR Cup	1:37.194	William Byron	Chevrolet Camaro ZL1	2019 Toyota/Save Mart 350
GT4	1:46.124	Stevan McAleer	Porsche 718 Cayman GT4 RS Clubsport	2022 Sonoma GT4 America round
TCR Touring Car	1:49.023	Tyler Maxson	Hyundai Veloster N TCR	2020 Sonoma TC America round
Toyota GR Cup	1:54.637	Spike Kohlbecker	Toyota GR86	2023 Sonoma Toyota GR Cup North America round
Alternative Long Circuit (2002–present): 4.077 km (2.533 mi)
Ferrari Challenge	1:31.357	Roberto Perrina	Ferrari 296 Challenge	2025 Sonoma Ferrari Challenge North America round
GT3	1:32.119	Colin Braun	Mercedes-AMG GT3 Evo	2024 Sonoma GT World Challenge America round
SRO GT2	1:39.946	Brent Holden	Mercedes-AMG GT2	2024 Sonoma GT America round
GT4	1:41.208	Matheus Leist	Mercedes-AMG GT4	2024 Sonoma GT4 America round
Porsche Carrera Cup	1:42.384	James Sofronas	Porsche 911 (992) GT3 Cup	2023 Sonoma Porsche Sprint Challenge USA West round
Toyota GR Cup	1:50.650	Gresham Wagner	Toyota GR86	2024 Sonoma Toyota GR Cup North America round
WTCC Circuit (2012–present): 4.032 km (2.505 mi)
Auto GP	1:27.691	Daniël de Jong	Lola B05/52	2012 Sonoma Auto GP round
GT3	1:33.847	Colin Braun	Mercedes-AMG GT3 Evo	2025 Sonoma GT World Challenge America round
McLaren Trophy	1:38.122	Jeff Cook	McLaren Artura Trophy	2026 Sonoma McLaren Trophy America round
Ferrari Challenge	1:41.549	Cooper MacNeil	Ferrari 488 Challenge Evo	2021 Sonoma Ferrari Challenge North America round
GT4	1:42.161	Kenton Koch	BMW M4 GT4 Evo (G82)	2026 Sonoma GT4 America round
Super 2000	1:46.905	Tiago Monteiro	Honda Civic WTCC	2013 FIA WTCC Race of the United States
Toyota GR Cup	1:51.668	Ethan Goulart	Toyota GR86	2025 Sonoma Toyota GR Cup North America round
IndyCar Circuit (2012–present): 3.838 km (2.385 mi)
IndyCar	1:18:3576	Simon Pagenaud	Dallara DW12	2017 GoPro Grand Prix of Sonoma
Indy Lights	1:28.9075	Jack Harvey	Dallara IPS	2014 Grand Prix of Sonoma
Pro Mazda	1:33.5571	Scott Hargrove	Star Formula Mazda 'Pro'	2014 Sonoma Pro Mazda round
US F2000	1:35.7970	Florian Latorre	Van Diemen DP08	2014 Sonoma US F2000 round
Porsche Carrera Cup	1:38.035	Will Hardeman	Porsche 911 (991 II) GT3 Cup	2017 Sonoma Porsche GT3 Cup Challenge USA round
Club Circuit/NASCAR Road Course (2002–present): 3.203 km (1.990 mi)
NASCAR Cup	1:13.629	Kyle Larson	Chevrolet Camaro ZL1	2024 Toyota/Save Mart 350
NASCAR O'Reilly Auto Parts	1:16.384	Ty Gibbs	Toyota Supra NASCAR	2024 Zip Buy Now, Pay Later 250
ARCA Menards	1:17.927	William Sawalich	Toyota Camry	2024 General Tire 200
NASCAR Truck Series	1:20.043	Kyle Busch	Toyota Tundra	2022 DoorDash 250
Alternative Motorcycle Circuit (2008–present): 3.701 km (2.300 mi)
Superbike	1:35.067	Cameron Beaubier	Yamaha YZF-R1	2018 Sonoma MotoAmerica round
Supersport	1:37.150	Garrett Gerloff	Yamaha YZF-R6	2017 Sonoma MotoAmerica round
IndyCar Circuit (2008–2011): 3.706 km (2.303 mi)
IndyCar	1:18.6320	Hélio Castroneves	Dallara IR-05	2008 Peak Antifreeze Indy Grand Prix
Indy Lights	1:24.9443	Jean-Karl Vernay	Dallara IPS	2010 Carneros 100
Star Mazda	1:29.877	Tristan Vautier	Star Formula Mazda 'Pro'	2011 Sonoma Star Mazda round
IndyCar Circuit (2005–2007): 3.838 km (2.385 mi)
IndyCar	1:17.5524	Tony Kanaan	Dallara IR-05	2007 Motorola Indy 300
Indy Lights	1:24.688	Richard Antinucci	Dallara IPS	2007 Valley of the Moon 100
Star Mazda	1:30.095	Raphael Matos	Star Formula Mazda 'Pro'	2005 Sonoma Star Mazda round
Long Circuit (1998–2001): 4.056 km (2.520 mi)
LMP900	1:22.863	Allan McNish	Audi R8	2000 Grand Prix of Sonoma
GT2 (GTS)	1:32.384	Olivier Beretta	Dodge Viper GTS-R	1999 Grand Prix of Sonoma
GT	1:34.614	Bill Auberlen	BMW M3 GTR	2001 Grand Prix of Sonoma
NASCAR Circuit (1998–2001): 3.137 km (1.949 mi)
NASCAR Truck Series	1:14.842	Boris Said	Ford F-150	1998 Kragen/Exide 151
Original Long Circuit (1968–1997): 4.060 km (2.523 mi)
IMSA GTP	1:25.057	Geoff Brabham	Nissan NPT-90	1990 Sears Point 300 Kilometers
Can-Am	1:25.810	Jacques Villeneuve, Sr.	Frissbee GR3	1983 Sears Point Can-Am round
WSC	1:27.411	Didier Theys	Ferrari 333 SP	1996 California Grand Prix
Formula Atlantic	1:29.510	Michael Andretti	Ralt RT4	1983 Sears Point Formula Atlantic round
IMSA GTP Lights	1:31.213	Dan Marvin	Spice SE90P	1990 Sears Point 300 Kilometers
IMSA GTS-1	1:35.156	Darin Brassfield	Oldsmobile Cutlass Supreme	1995 Apple Computer Inc. California Grand Prix
IMSA GTO	1:35.514	Hans-Joachim Stuck	Audi 90 Quattro	1989 Sears Point 200 km
GT1 (Prototype)	1:35.589	Doc Bundy	Panoz Esperante GTR-1	1997 California Grand Prix Sears Point
IMSA GTX	1:35.710	Brian Redman	Lola T600	1981 Datsun Camel GT Sears Point
F5000	1:37.200	Ron Grable	Lola T190	1970 Continental 49'er Trophy
IMSA GTU	1:39.357	Dorsey Schroeder	Dodge Daytona	1988 Lincoln-Mercury California Grand Prix
Group 5	1:40.640	David Hobbs	BMW 320i Turbo	1977 Executive Motorhome Challenge Series Sears Point
IMSA GTS-2	1:41.606	Bill Auberlen	Mazda RX-7	1995 Apple Computer Inc. California Grand Prix
Pickup truck racing	1:42.459	Dave Rezendes	Chevrolet C/K	1997 Kragen/Exide 151
Group 4	1:42.590	Dennis Aase	BMW M1	1981 Datsun Camel GT Sears Point
IMSA Supercar	1:50.745	Shawn Hendricks	BMW M5 (E34)	1995 Sears Point IMSA Bridgestone Supercar round
