= NHRA Sonoma Nationals =

Annual drag racing event in Sonoma, California, U.S.

National Hot Rod Association
- Venue: Sonoma Raceway (1988–2019, 2021–present)
- Location: Sonoma, California, U.S. 38°09′39″N 122°27′18″W
- Corporate sponsor: Denso
- First race: 1988
- Previous names: California Nationals (1988); Fram Autolite NHRA Nationals; Toyota NHRA Sonoma Nationals

Circuit information
- Length: 1/4 mi (0.40 km)

The NHRA Sonoma Nationals is an annual drag racing event in the NHRA Mission Foods Drag Racing Series, that has been held almost annually at Sonoma Raceway in Sonoma, California since 1988 with the lone exception was during the 2020 race season because of the COVID pandemic.

== History ==
In 1987, the raceway signed a contract with the National Hot Rod Association for an event that was initially named the California Nationals, set to begin in 1988. NHRA has held National events at Sonoma every year since, with exception for 2020 due to effects of the COVID-19 pandemic and uncertainty about weather if the event were to be rescheduled to a date later in the year.

=== Race history ===
In 2004, Angelle Sampey became the first woman ever to win at a Sonoma Nationals event, competing in the Pro Stock Motorcycle category.

At the 2015 Sonoma Nationals, all 4 drivers that were the number one qualifiers went on to win the race in their respective categories, the first time in NHRA history that had ever happened at an event.

Also at the 2015 event, Jack Beckman piloted his Funny Car to 323.43 mph, which at the time was the quickest run in NHRA history. Two years later at the 2017 Sonoma Nationals, Robert Hight broke the record again going 339.87 mph. J.R. Todd's win in 2017 marked the first time an African-American won in NHRA Funny Car.

== Past winners ==
=== Professional Classes ===
Year	Top Fuel Dragster (TF/D)	Top Fuel Funny Car (TF/FC)	Pro Stock	Pro Stock Motorcycle	Source
1988	Joe Amato	Mark Oswald	Harry Scribner	N/A	
1989	Frank Bradley	Don Prudhomme	Bob Glidden	N/A	
1990	Gary Ormsby	John Force	Darrell Alderman	N/A	
1991	Joe Amato	John Force	Darrell Alderman	N/A	
1992	Don Prudhomme	John Force	Warren Johnson	N/A	
1993	Eddie Hill	Tom Hoover	Rickie Smith	N/A	
1994	Scott Kalitta	John Force	Darrell Alderman	N/A	
1995	Mike Dunn	Al Hofmann	Jim Yates	N/A	
1996	Blaine Johnson	Cruz Pedregon	Warren Johnson	N/A	
1997	Cory McClenathan	Ron Capps	Jim Yates	N/A	
1998	Doug Kalitta	Cruz Pedregon	Warren Johnson	N/A	
1999	Doug Kalitta	Whit Bazemore	Jim Yates	N/A	
2000	Doug Kalitta	John Force	Kurt Johnson	N/A	
2001	Kenny Bernstein	Del Worsham	Tom Martino	N/A	
2002	Doug Herbert	John Force	Larry Morgan	Craig Treble	
2003	Larry Dixon	Gary Scelzi	Jeg Coughlin	Geno Scali	
2004	Doug Kalitta	Tim Wilkerson	Greg Anderson	Angelle Sampey	
2005	Doug Kalitta	Gary Scelzi	Greg Anderson	Andrew Hines	
2006	J.R. Todd	Eric Medlen	Jason Line	Chip Ellis	
2007	Tony Schumacher	John Force	Greg Anderson	Matt Smith	
2008	Tony Schumacher	Robert Hight	Dave Connolly	Matt Guidera	
2009	Antron Brown	Tim Wilkerson	Jason Line	Andrew Hines	
2010	Larry Dixon	Ron Capps	Jeg Coughlin Jr.	Michael Phillips	
2011	Antron Brown	Ron Capps	Greg Anderson	L.E. Tonglet	
2012	Antron Brown	Johnny Gray	Allen Johnson	Eddie Krawiec	
2013	Shawn Langdon	Ron Capps	Vincent Nobile	Hector Arana Jr.	
2014	Khalid al-Balooshi	Courtney Force	Jason Line	Eddie Krawiec	
2015	Antron Brown	Jack Beckman	Chris McGaha	Eddie Krawiec	
2016	J.R. Todd	John Force	Greg Anderson	L.E. Tonglet	
2017	Steve Torrence	J.R. Todd	Tanner Gray	L.E. Tonglet	
2018	Blake Alexander	Robert Hight	Jeg Coughlin Jr.	L.E. Tonglet	
2019	Billy Torrence	Robert Hight	Greg Anderson	Andrew Hines	
2020	Event not held due to COVID-19 pandemic				
2021	Steve Torrence	Robert Hight	Aaron Stanfield	Karen Stoffer	
2022	Brittany Force	Bob Tasca III	Erica Enders	Joey Gladstone	
2023	Justin Ashley	J.R. Todd	N/A	Gaige Herrera	
2024	Antron Brown	Bob Tasca III	Aaron Stanfield	Matt Smith	
2025	Doug Kalitta	Austin Prock	Greg Stanfield	Richard Gadson	
2026	Doug Kalitta	Jordan Vandergriff	Greg Stanfield	NC (Note: Non-championship speciality event for Pro Stock Motorcycle with only the top eight in the speciality round points participating.)	
