= Dallara IPS =

Open-wheel formula racing car built by Dallara

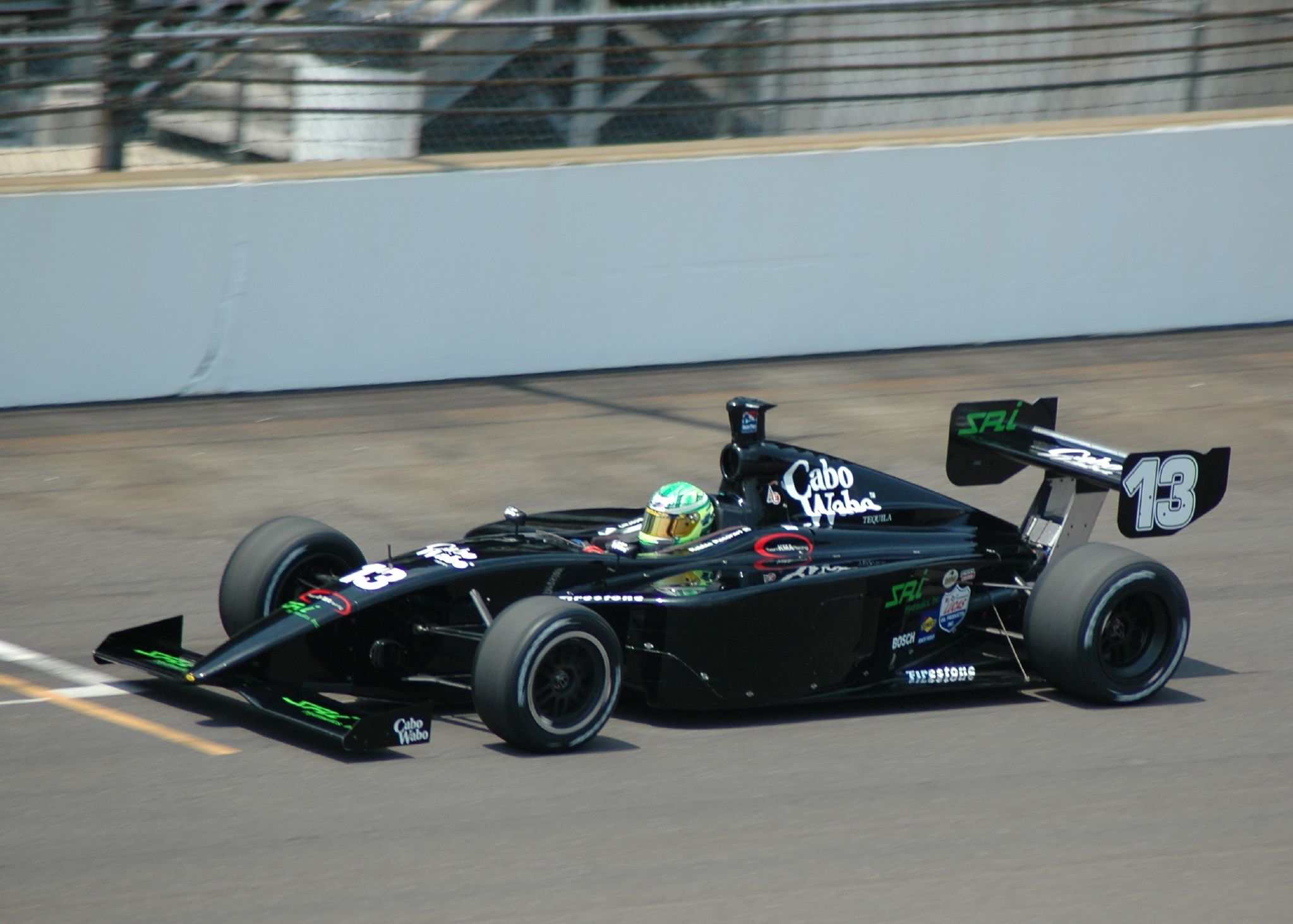
- Category: Indy Lights
- Constructor: Dallara
- Successor: Dallara IL-15

Technical specifications
- Chassis: Carbon fiber honeycomb composite monocoque
- Length: 191.5 in (4,860 mm)
- Width: 75 in (1,900 mm)
- Axle track: Front: 67 in (1,700 mm); Rear: 64 in (1,600 mm)
- Wheelbase: 117–120 in (3,000–3,000 mm)
- Engine: Mid-engine, longitudinally mounted, 3,497 cc (3.5 L; 213.4 cu in), Infiniti Q45, 90° V8, DOHC, NA
- Transmission: Ricardo 6-speed sequential manual
- Power: 420–450 bhp (426–456 PS; 313–336 kW); 300.0 lb⋅ft (406.7 N⋅m)
- Weight: 1,430–1,520 lb (650–690 kg) (track dependent)
- Fuel: Sunoco 100-RON unleaded gasoline
- Tyres: Firestone

Competition history
- Debut: 2002

The Dallara IPS is an open-wheel formula racing car chassis, designed, developed and built by Italian manufacturer Dallara for Indy Lights, a feeder-series for the IndyCar Series. It was the sole chassis used by Indy Lights, a one-make spec-series, between 2002 and 2014.
