= Star Formula Mazda 'Pro' (car) =

Star Mazda 'Pro'
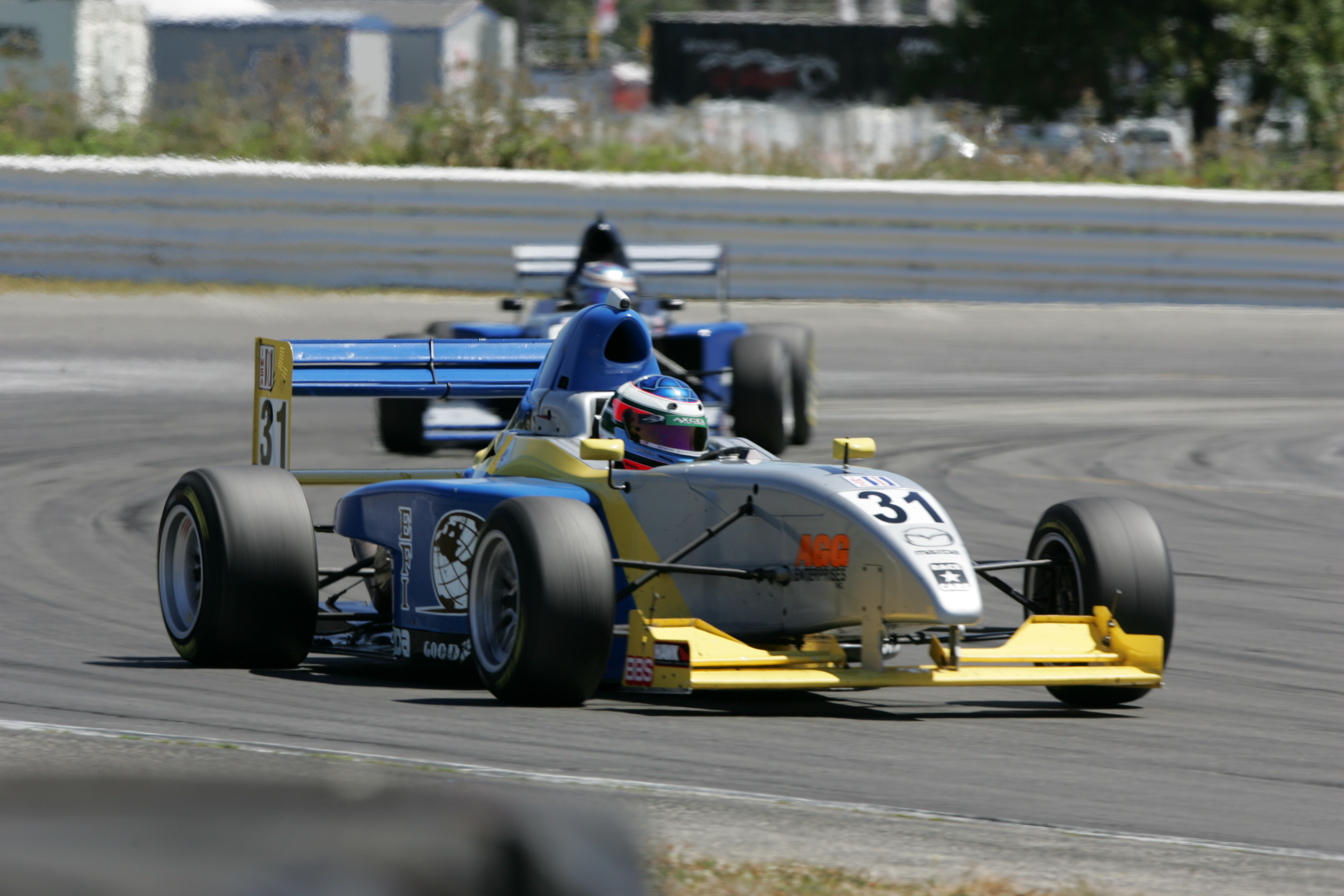
- Category: Star Mazda (Formula Mazda)
- Constructor: Star Race Cars

Technical specifications
- Chassis: Carbon fiber composite monocoque
- Suspension: Pushrod, inboard with two-way adjustable shock absorbers, adjustable rear anti-roll bar, cockpit adjustable front anti-roll bar.
- Engine: Mazda "Renesis" 1.3 L (79.3 cu in) 2-rotor wankel mid-engined
- Transmission: 6-speed sequential manual
- Power: 240–260 hp (180–190 kW)
- Weight: ~ 1,090 lb (494.4 kg)
- Tyres: Cooper

Competition history
- Debut: 2004

The Star Mazda Pro, is an open-wheel formula racing car, designed, developed and built by Star Race Cars, for the North American Pro Mazda Championship spec-series, between 2004 and 2017. They were powered by 240 hp (180 kW) "Renesis" wankel rotary engine.

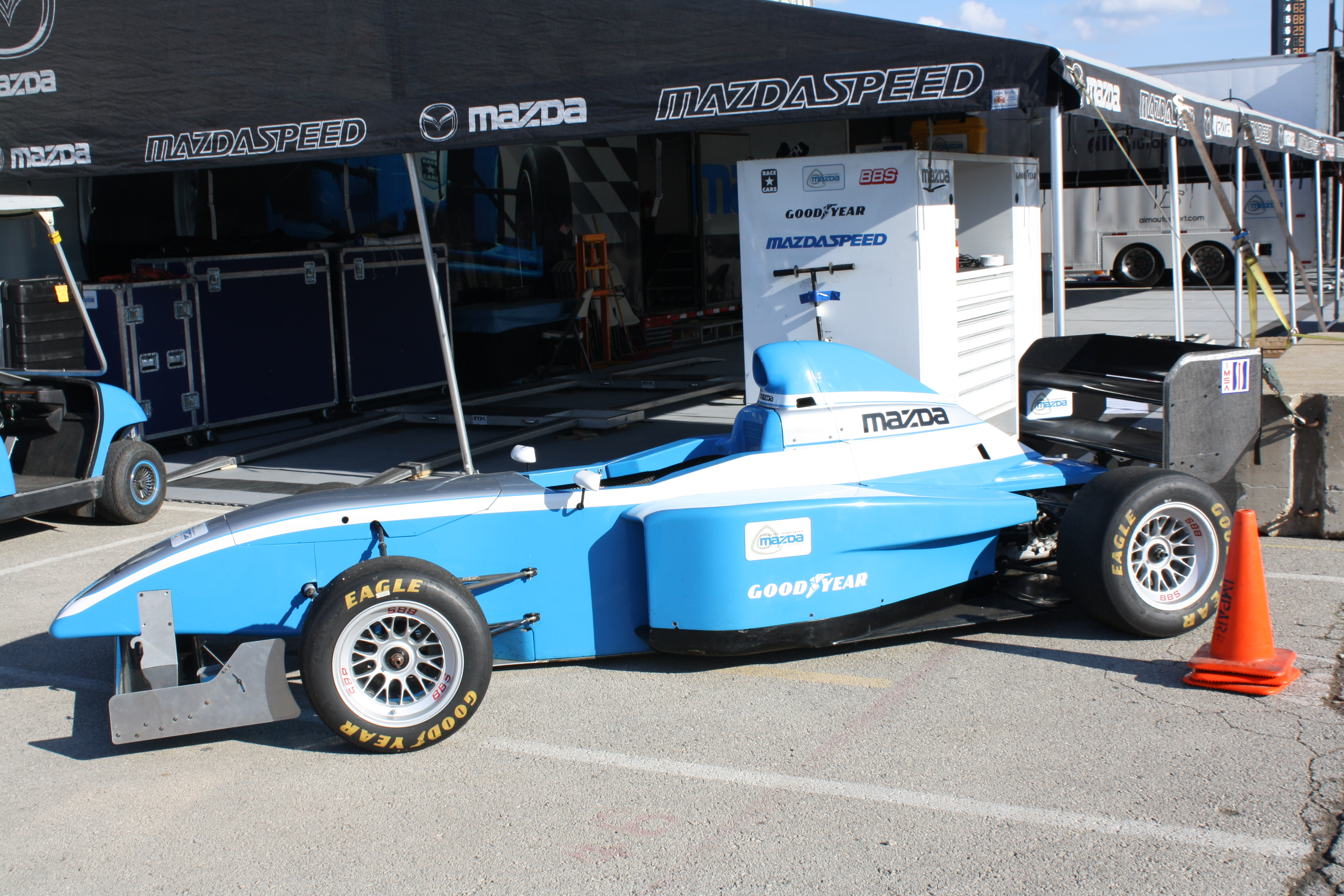

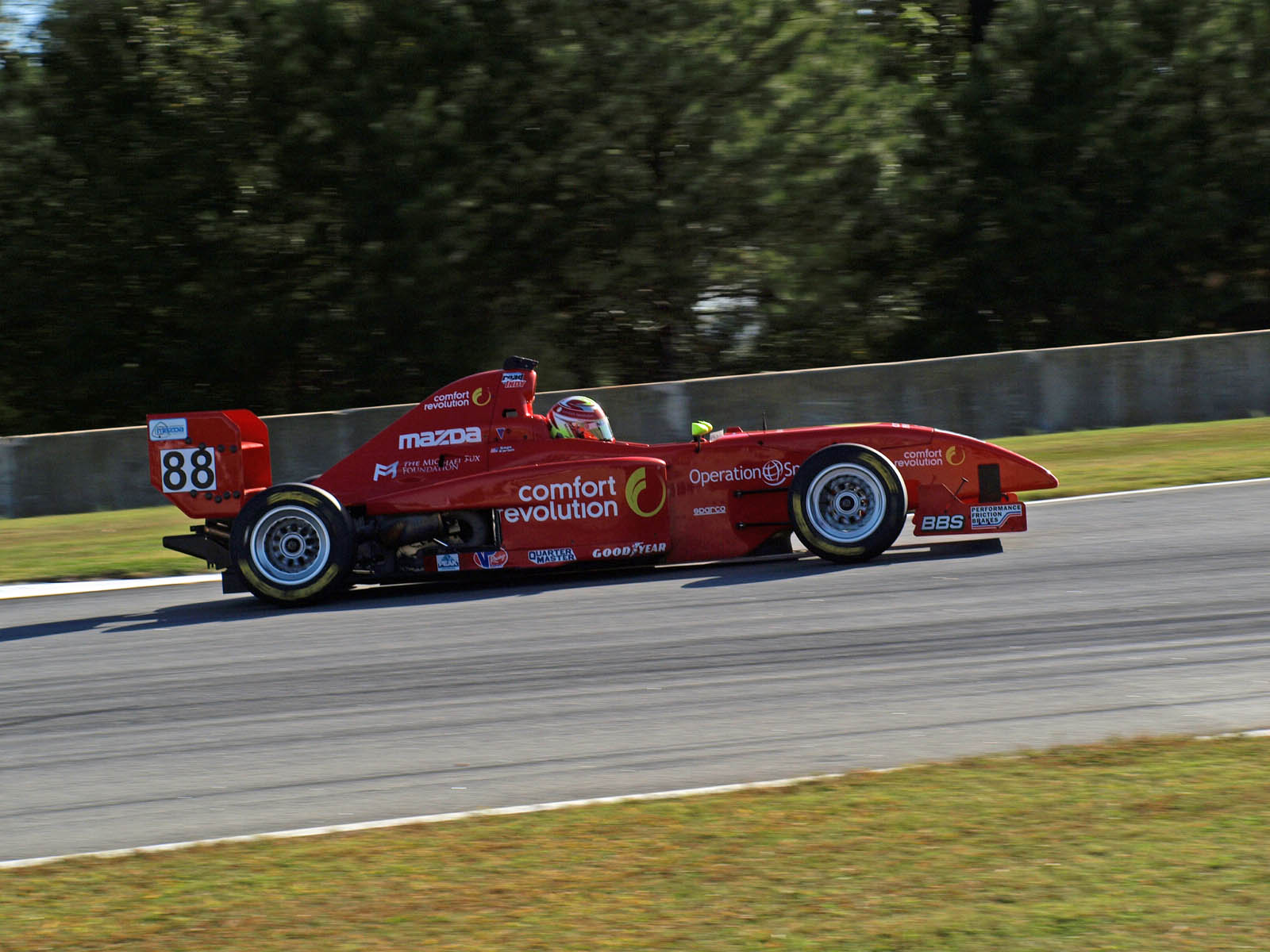

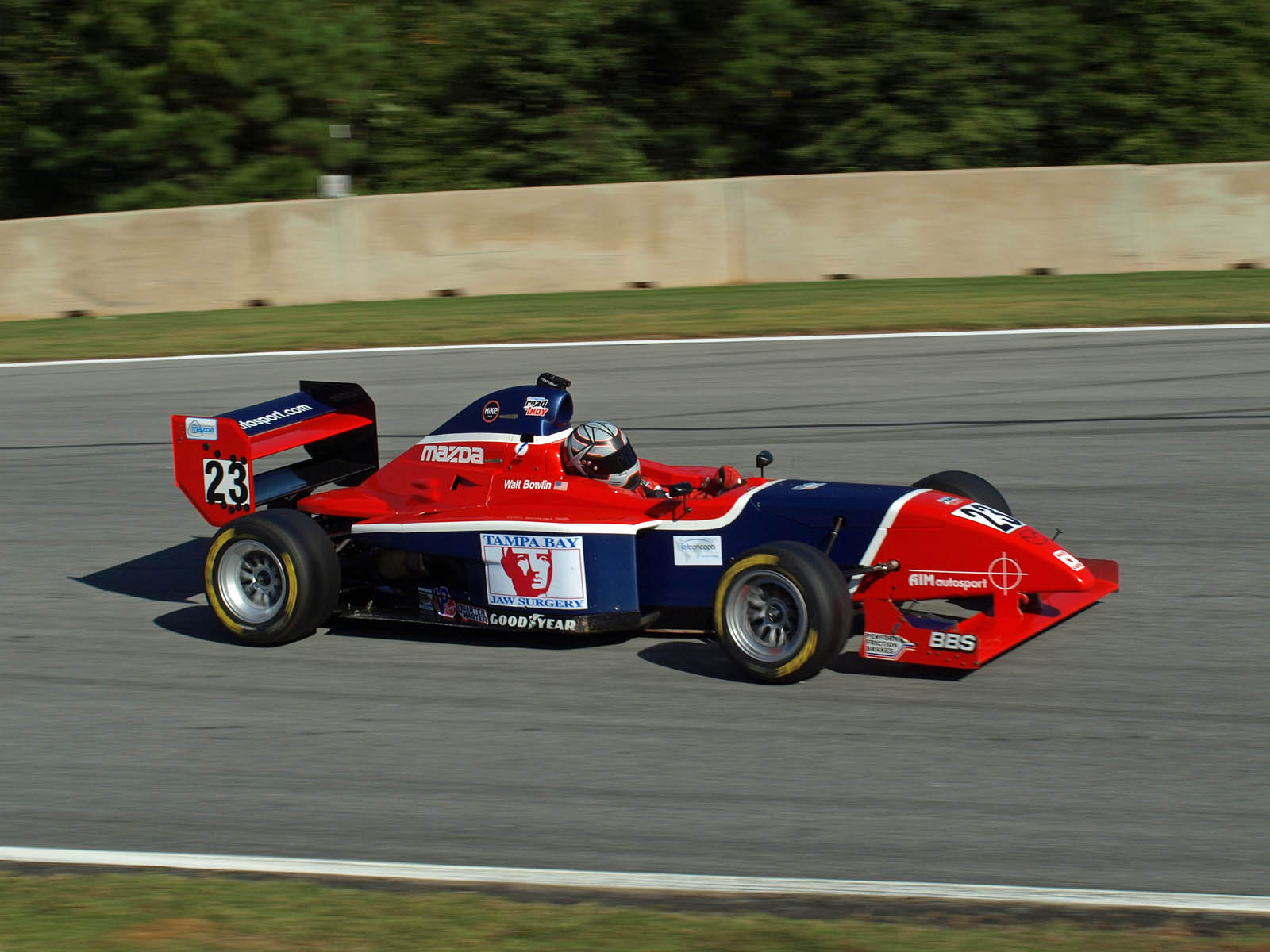

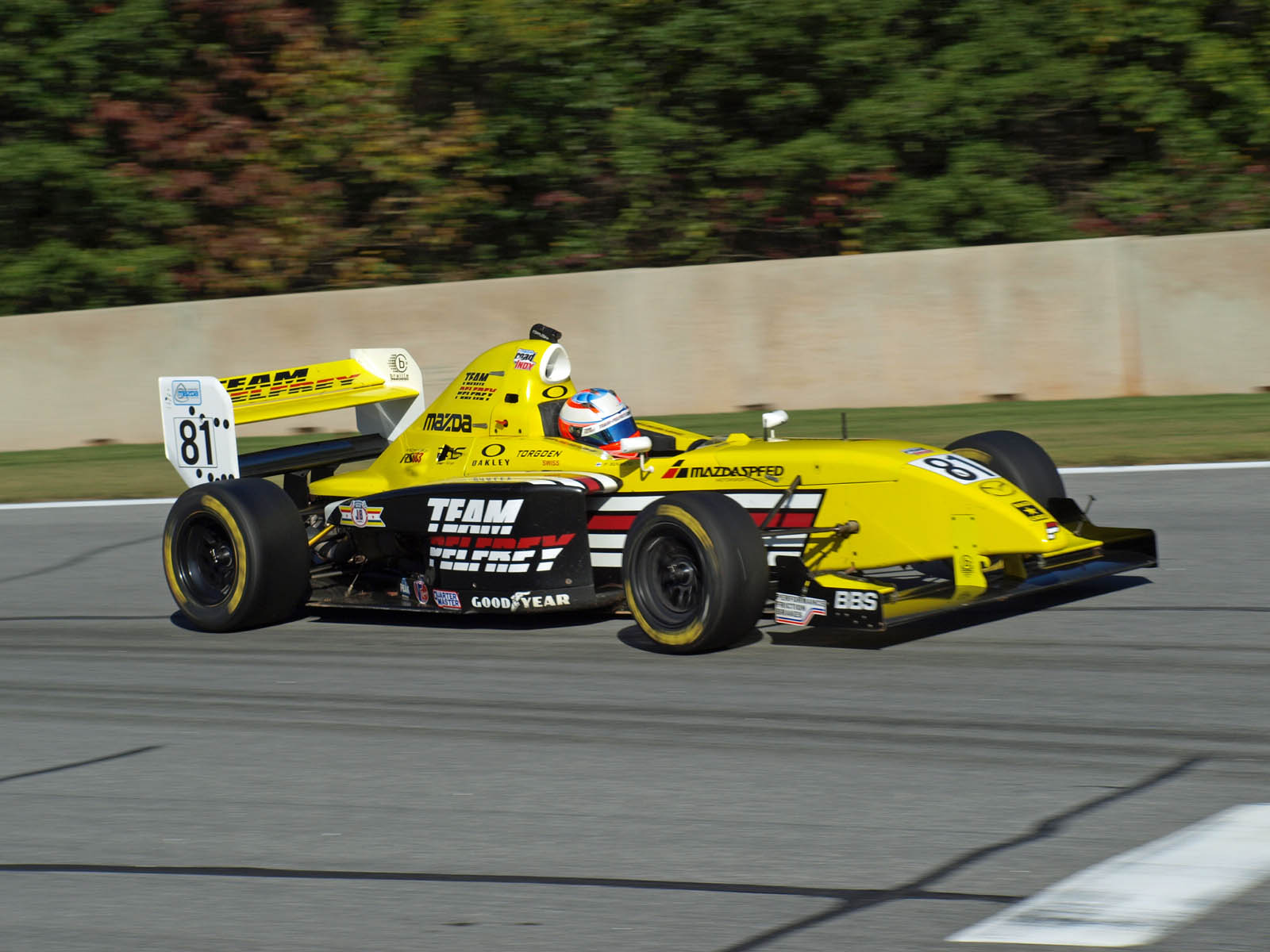

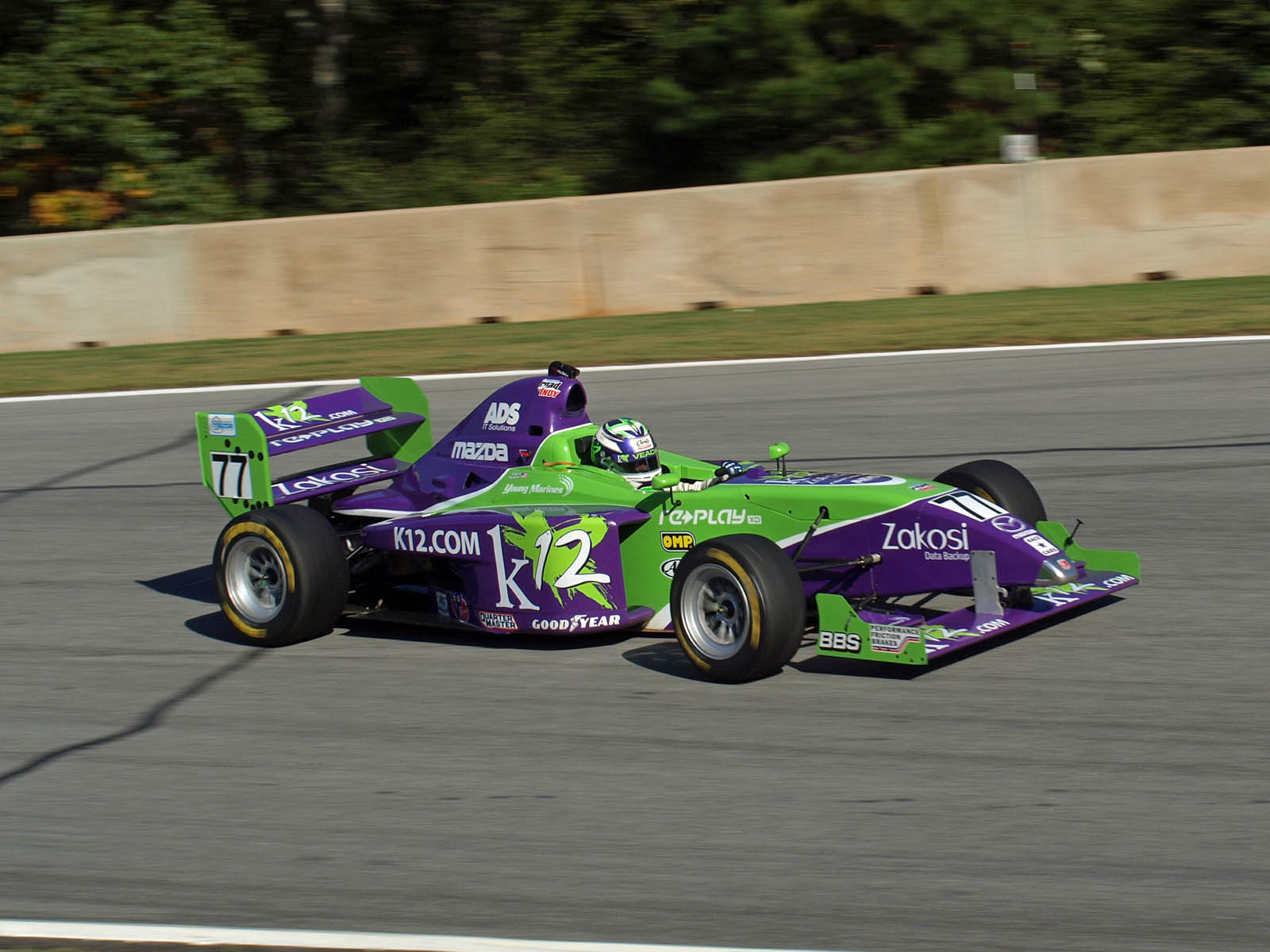
